= Wessex Trains =

British train operating company, 2001-2006

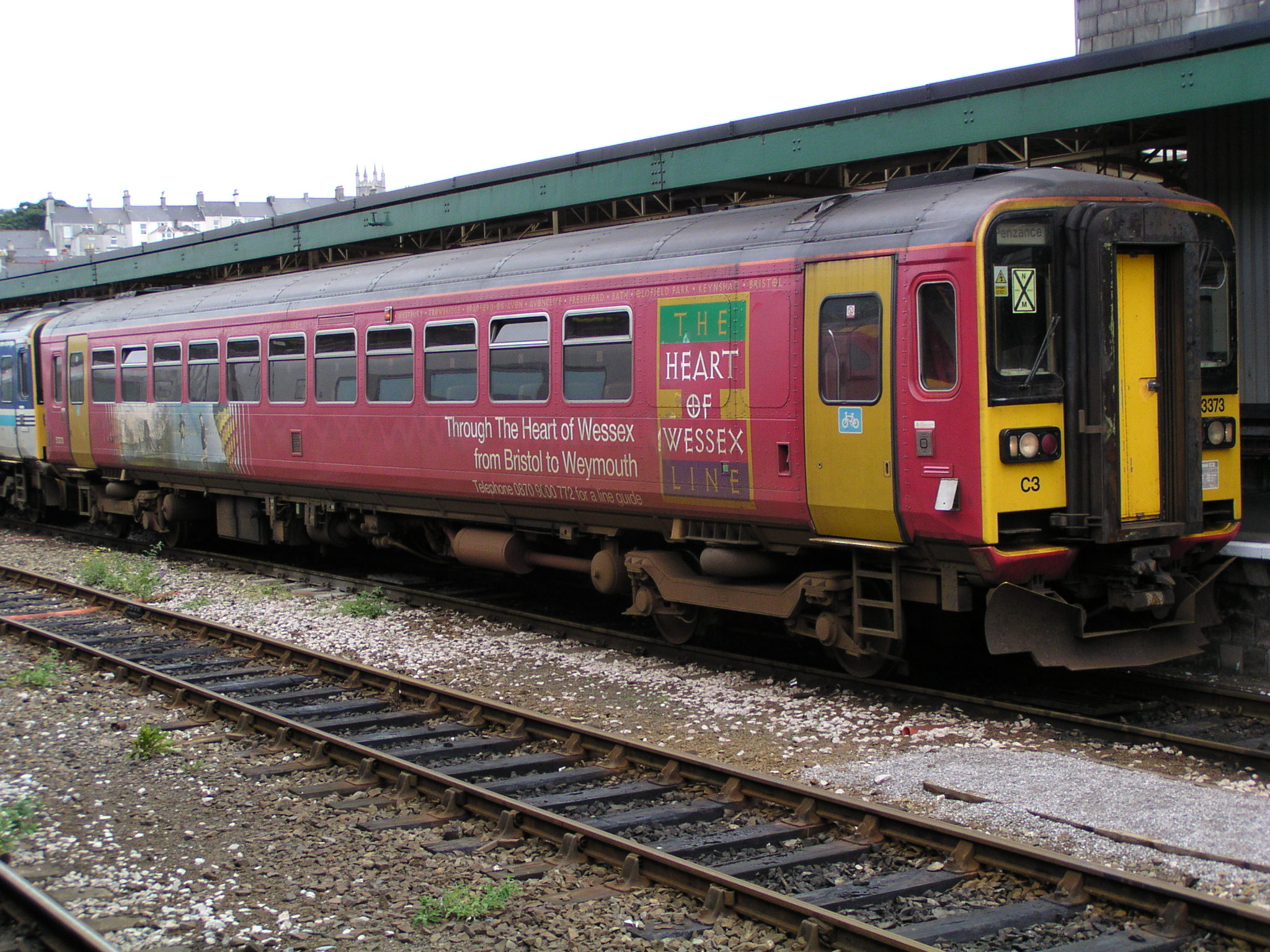
- Class 153 Super Sprinter at Plymouth in 2003.

Overview
- Franchises: Wessex; 14 October 2001 – 31 March 2006
- Main region: South West England
- Other regions: South East England, South Wales
- Fleet: 70
- Stations called at: 161
- Stations operated: 125
- Parent company: National Express Group
- Reporting mark: WE
- Successor: First Great Western

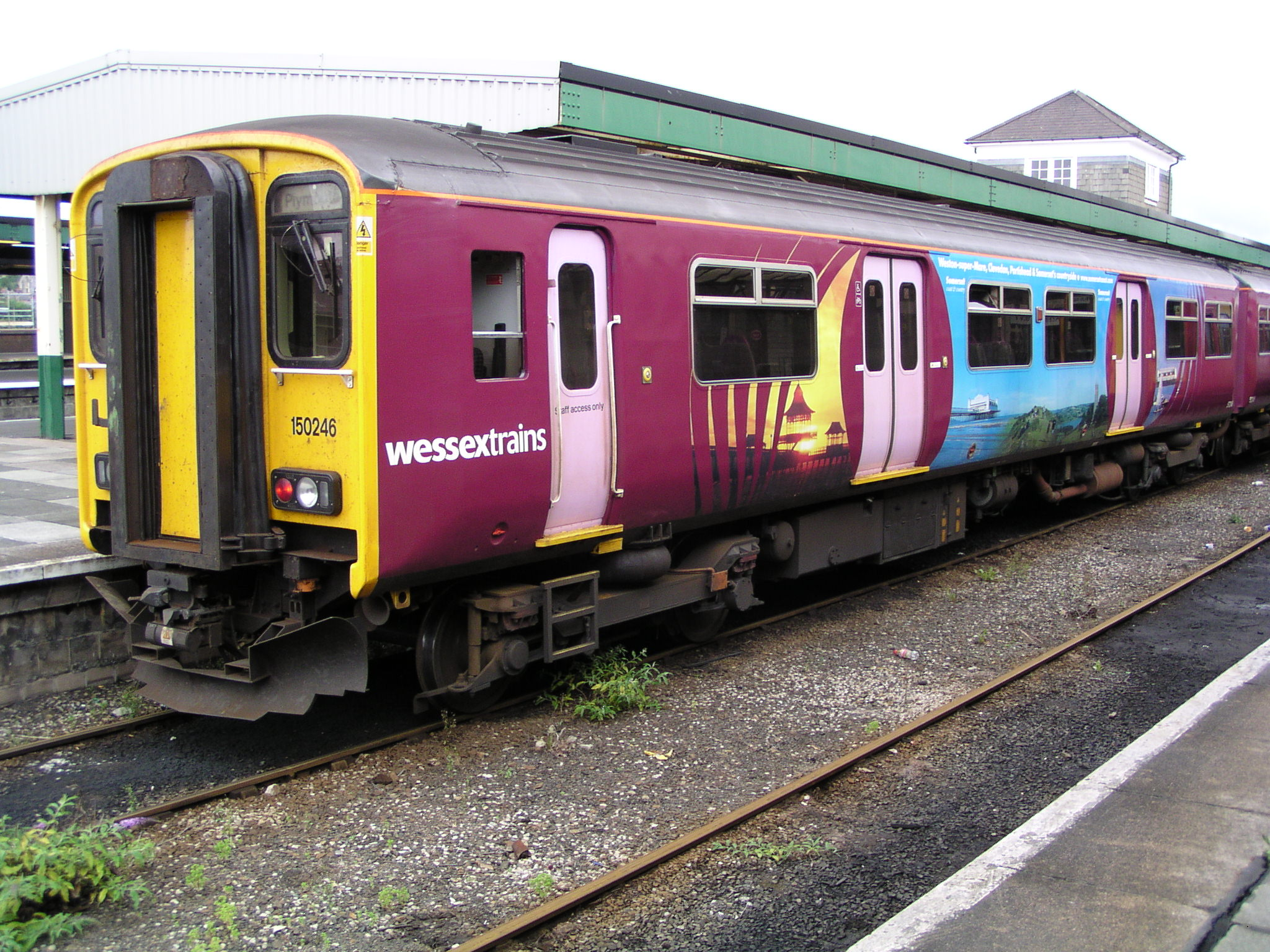
A Class 150 Sprinter in West Country advertising livery. Many of these units were named after local attractions.

Wessex Trains was a British train operating company owned by National Express that operated the Wessex Trains franchise from October 2001 until March 2006, when the franchise was merged with the Great Western and Thames Trains franchises to form the Greater Western franchise.

== History ==
In October 1996, Wales & West commenced operating the South West & Wales franchise in Wales and the West Country. It also operated services to Liverpool Lime Street, Manchester Piccadilly, Birmingham International, Southampton Central, Brighton and London Waterloo.

In 2001 the Strategic Rail Authority decided to re-organise the Valley Lines and Wales & West franchises, both being operated by National Express. Wales & West became Wessex Trains from October 2001.

Wessex Trains retained the West Country services with the Welsh services transferred to Wales & Borders although Wessex Trains operated services to Cardiff.

== Services ==
Wessex Trains ran the majority of local trains in the South West as seen in their route map, including retaining the Alphaline branding.

Services ran from Great Malvern and Cardiff to Brighton, Portsmouth, Weymouth and Penzance and on these secondary lines:

- Atlantic Coast Line (Par – Newquay)
- Avocet Line (Exeter – Exmouth)
- Golden Valley Line (Swindon – Gloucester)
- Heart of Wessex Line (Westbury – Weymouth)
- Looe Valley Line (Liskeard – Looe)
- Maritime Line (Truro – Falmouth)
- Riviera Line (Exeter – Paignton)
- Severn Beach Line (Bristol – Avonmouth – Severn Beach)
- St Ives Bay Line (St Erth – St Ives)
- Tamar Valley Line (Plymouth – Gunnislake)
- Tarka Line (Exeter – Barnstaple)

== Rolling stock ==
Wessex Trains inherited a fleet of Class 143s, Class 150s, Class 153s and Class 158s from Wales & West.

Wessex Trains leased Class 31 locomotives from Fragonset to haul a set of Mark 2 carriages from 2002 on services from Cardiff and Bristol Temple Meads to Brighton and Weymouth.

Class	Image	Type	Top speed		Number	Built
Class	Image	Type	mph	km/h	Number	Built
31		Diesel locomotive	80	129	2	1957–1962
143 Pacer		Diesel multiple unit	75	120	8	1985–1986
150 Sprinter		Diesel multiple unit	75	120	25	1984–1987
153 Super Sprinter		Diesel multiple unit	75	120	13	1987–1988
158 Express Sprinter		Diesel multiple unit	90	145	12	1989–1992
Mark 2 carriages		Passenger carriage	100	160	5	1969–1975

== Depots ==
Wessex Trains' fleet was maintained at Cardiff Canton and Exeter depots.

== Demise ==
In 2002 as part of a franchise re-organisation by the Strategic Rail Authority, it was announced that the Great Western, Thames Trains and Wessex Trains franchises would be combined to form the Greater Western franchise. This was part of a Strategic Rail Authority strategy to reduce the number of train operating companies providing services from London terminal stations.

Originally it was planned for Wessex Trains to take over the diesel services from Exeter St Davids to London Waterloo on the West of England Main Line operated by South West Trains as part of the South Western franchise.

On 13 December 2005 the Department for Transport awarded the Greater Western franchise to FirstGroup and the services operated by Wessex Trains transferred to First Great Western on 1 April 2006.

Preceded by Wales & West; Wales & West franchise	Operator of Wessex franchise 2001–2006	Succeeded by First Great Western; Greater Western franchise
