= Valley Line =

Valley Line or Valley Lines may refer to:

- Valley Line (Edmonton), a light rail line in Canada
- Valley Lines (train operating company), operating in Wales 1996–2001
- Valleys & Cardiff Local Routes, formerly Valley Lines, a rail network radiating from Cardiff, Wales

== See also ==
- Thalweg, the line of lowest elevation within a valley or watercourse
