= Central Trains =

Train operating company in England and Wales

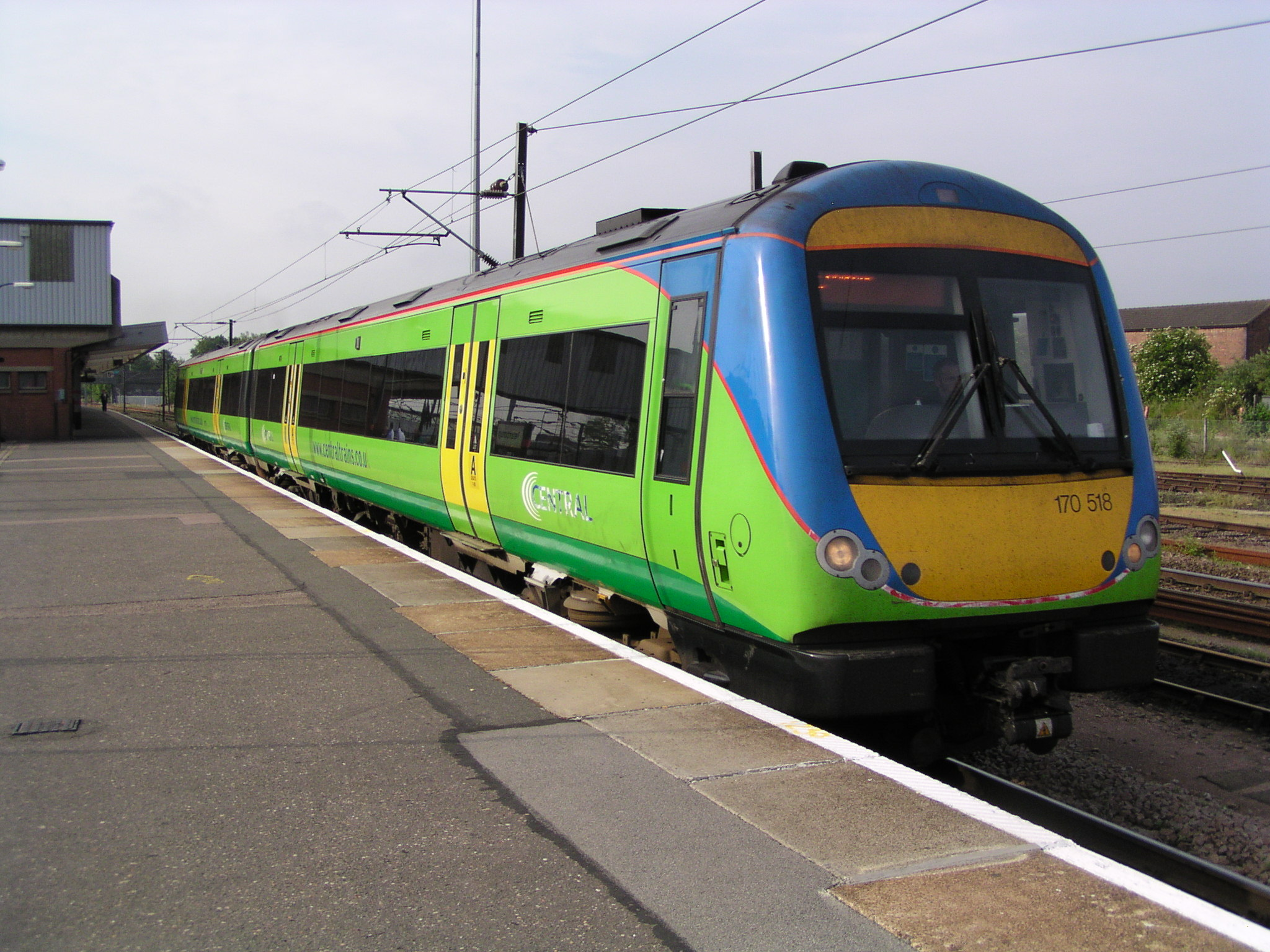
- A Class 170 Turbostar at Peterborough in 2004

Overview
- Franchises: Central Trains; 2 March 1997 – 11 November 2007
- Main regions: Midlands (East, West)
- Other regions: North West England, East Anglia, South East Wales
- Fleet: 156
- Stations called at: 232 (193 operated)
- Parent company: National Express
- Reporting mark: CT
- Predecessor: Regional Railways
- Successor: London Midland; East Midlands Trains; CrossCountry

Central Trains' earliest logo, drawing on that of predecessor Regional Railways

Central Trains was a British train operating company owned by National Express that operated a variety of local and inter-regional trains from 2 March 1997 until 11 November 2007.

== Overview ==
Created out of the Central division of Regional Railways during the Privatisation of British Rail, Central Trains passed into the private sector on 2 March 1997. The franchise was awarded to National Express, who maintained control of the company until its eventual demise in 2007. Central Trains employed over 2,400 staff.

The company invested significantly in rolling stock, with significant orders for new trains placed and the fleet later further grown through the acquisition of trains made surplus by other companies. Despite a reduction in the area covered during the ten years of its existence, the company grew its core fleet from fewer than 300 passenger vehicles to a total of 379 – a capacity increase of over 28%. It also refurbished a number of its stations, introducing ticket gates, help points and live information boards.

Central Trains also clamped down on vandalism on its trains and fare evasion, including through a controversial poster campaign publicising the names and addresses of passengers who had been fined for not having valid tickets.

The franchise gained a reputation for poor timekeeping: its best performing period between 2000 and 2007 still saw one in six trains five minutes late or more, with punctuality dropping as low as 61% in 2003. The company also suffered from ongoing staff relations problems which led to extensive and long-lasting cancellations of Sunday services.

Following a government policy announced in 2004, Central Trains was eventually disbanded in November 2007 with its services dispersed amongst London Midland, East Midlands Trains and CrossCountry.

== Network ==
At its greatest extent, Central Trains operated 253 stations and provided services covering 1,534 miles of the UK's railway network, covering most of central England and Mid Wales. In its last years, the company saw 43 million passenger journeys and a total of 930 million miles travelled every year.

Services ranged from rural and local services to flagship express services originally branded as Alphaline and later developed into Central Citylink. In the West Midlands, the company also operated the extensive urban rail services under contract to the West Midlands Passenger Transport Executive.

=== Long distance services ===
Key longer distance and express routes included:

- Birmingham New Street – Liverpool Lime Street
- Birmingham New Street – Stansted Airport
- Cardiff Central – Birmingham New Street – Nottingham
- Liverpool Lime Street – Nottingham – Norwich

From 2003 onwards, the Central Citylink brand name was used by Central Trains to differentiate its long-distance and regional express routes from local services. The brand was used in timetables and publicity to highlight the enhanced service provided on such routes.

A map of the Citylink routes

While there was no separate dedicated fleet, Citylink services were usually operated by Central Trains' more modern Class 170 and Class 158 diesel multiple units, featuring air-conditioning and reservable seating. At-seat catering was also provided on many services.

Central Trains' Guide 1 timetable was designated for all Citylink services, and highlight the special features of the brand.

=== Regional services ===
- Birmingham New Street – Nottingham via Leicester (terminated at Leicester from 2004)
- Birmingham New Street – Nottingham via Derby
- Birmingham New Street – Shrewsbury
- Birmingham New Street – Mid Wales and Chester (transferred away in 2001)
- Northampton – Crewe
- Coventry – Lincoln Central via Nuneaton (ceased in 2004)
- Nuneaton – Coventry (from 2005)
- Nottingham – Skegness
- Doncaster / Lincoln Central – Peterborough via Spalding
- Newark North Gate – Lincoln – Cleethorpes
- Leicester – Lincoln Central (from 2004)
- Derby – Crewe / Nottingham / Matlock
- Nottingham – Mansfield Woodhouse / Worksop

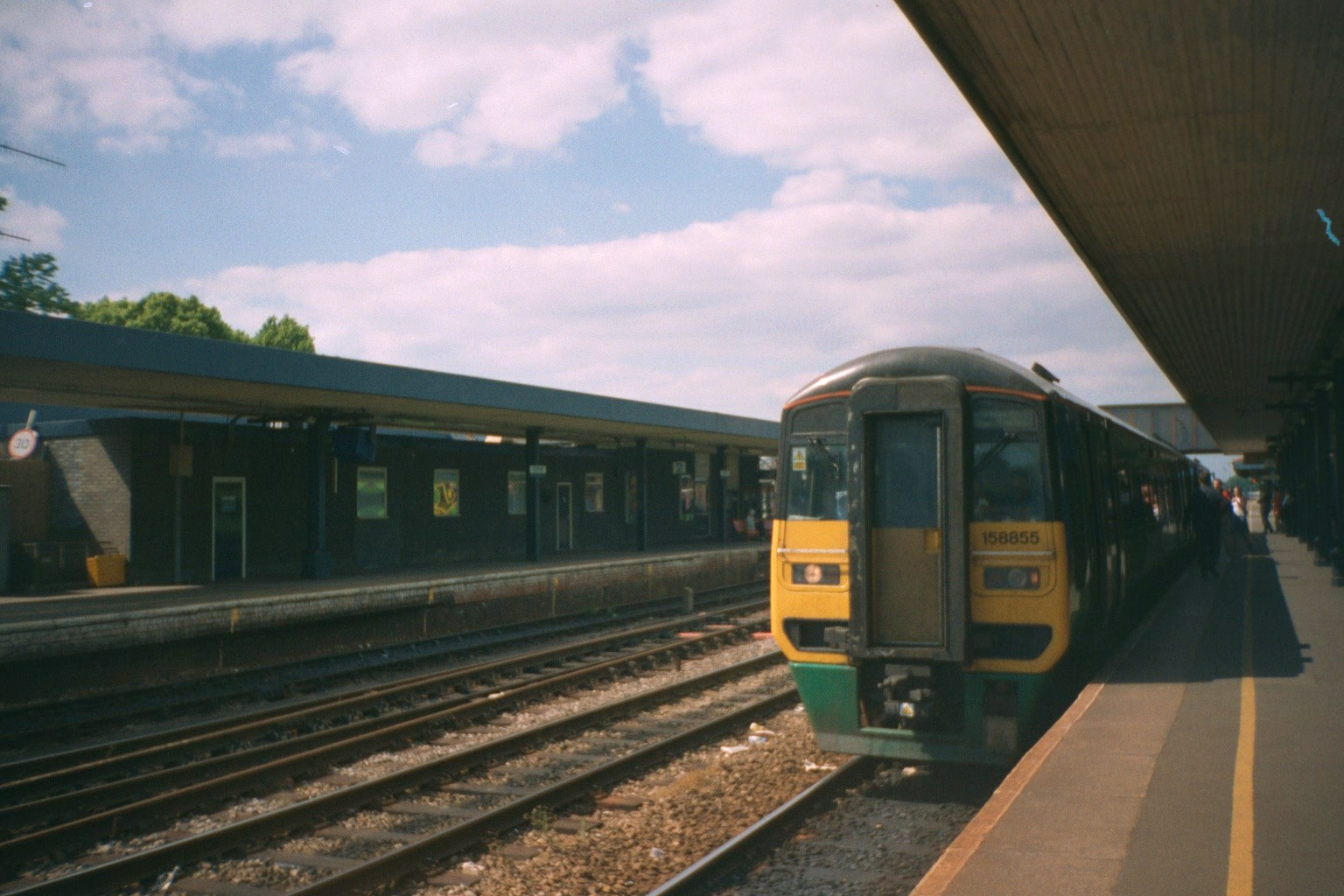
Central Trains' 158855 at Oxford in 2003, on hire to Thames Trains for Bristol-Oxford and Oxford-Bicester Town services.

=== Network West Midlands services ===
- Coventry – Birmingham New Street – Wolverhampton (split at New Street in 2004)
- Cross City Line: Redditch/Longbridge – Four Oaks/Lichfield Trent Valley
- Snow Hill Lines: Great Malvern/Worcester/Kidderminster – Dorridge/Shirley/Stratford-upon-Avon
- Chase Line: Birmingham – Walsall / Stafford (cut back to Rugeley in 2005)
- Walsall – Wellington via Wolverhampton
- Worcester – Birmingham New Street

== Service Changes ==
=== 1990s New long distance services ===
In the late 1990s, Central Trains began publicising additional long-distance through journeys, by amalgamating previously self-contained services in its timetables. For example, where a train had previously been timetabled to work a Shrewsbury to Birmingham service followed by a Birmingham to Leicester service, the workings were combined and shown as a single direct Shrewsbury – Birmingham – Leicester service in the public timetable. This resulted in some particularly lengthy services such as those from Aberystwyth in Mid Wales to Grimsby on the opposite coast of the UK.

Additionally, direct services from Birmingham to Stansted Airport were introduced during May 1998.

=== 2001 Mid Wales service transfer ===
Services west of Shrewsbury to Aberystwyth, Pwllheli and Chester were transferred away as part of the formation of a new combined Wales & Borders franchise in late 2001. Eleven Class 158 units were transferred to the new operator at this time.

=== 2004–2005 Service changes ===
Central Trains had a major shakeup between 2004–2005 to prepare them for the eventual break up of the franchise. In 2004, services from Leamington Spa to Birmingham Snow Hill & Stratford upon Avon were transferred into Chiltern Railways, but the company maintained a peak hour service to and from Leamington Spa. The service between Birmingham and Stourbridge was increased to every 10 minutes and this in turn increased the Kidderminster service, as a part of the new Stourbridge line timetable all remaining Birmingham New Street trains were diverted into Birmingham Snow Hill. Liverpool Lime Street to Stansted Airport split at New Street to form two services due to problems with delays. Previously Central Trains ran services from Birmingham New Street to Nottingham via Leicester as well as Derby, this service was split, the Leicester to Nottingham service was merged with the hourly Ivanhoe Line service to Loughbourgh and was extended past Nottingham all stations to Lincoln.

During 2004, Trent Valley local services that ran generally between Stafford and Nuneaton (some extended to / from Coventry or Rugby) were discontinued due to a Driver shortage and not restored until over year later, when they were replaced by an electric service from Northampton to Crewe. Another fatality of the 'lack of Drivers' was the service between Birmingham to Stafford via Walsall, services were cut back (as today) to run between Birmingham and Rugeley Trent Valley.

Central discontinued their single Northampton service a day which ran to Nottingham (and other locations) via Birmingham once they gained the Birmingham to Northampton route from sister company Silverlink Trains in 2004–2005. Two trains per hour from Birmingham New Street – London Euston via Northampton was replaced by one train per hour to Northampton which connected badly with onward services to London Euston (although a few trains a day did run straight through to / from London as an unofficial joint service). The Northampton service started off as an hourly express service until it was merged with the local service to Coventry adding more journey time.

Coventry to Nottingham via Leicester services were discontinued after engineering work at Nuneaton station made it impossible for trains from Coventry to join the line towards Leicester and no attempt was ever made to rectify this. This service was restored in 2005 as an hourly shuttle to Nuneaton, with passengers requiring changing at Nuneaton for Leicester (and change again at Leicester for Nottingham).

The local service to and from Coventry to Wolverhampton calling all stations was also changed in 2004. It was split at Birmingham New Street as Central Trains starting operating Class 321 EMUs. A later development was implemented that had trains running express from New Street to Birmingham International (with some stops at Marston Green) then all stations to Coventry and services to Walsall were extended to Birmingham International calling all stations, Adderley Park station was cut down to one train per hour shortly after this.

Central Trains operated train crew depots at:

- Birmingham New Street, Birmingham Snow Hill, Boston, Cambridge, Coventry, Crewe, Leicester, Lincoln, Machynlleth (until 2001), Norwich, Nottingham, Pwllheli (until 2001), Shrewsbury, Stourbridge Junction, Leamington Spa, Wolverhampton and Worcester Shrub Hill

Central Trains maintained and stored trains at:

- Birmingham New Street, Birmingham Tyseley, Boston, Cambridge, Coventry, Crewe, Leicester, Lincoln, Machynlleth (until 2001), Norwich, Nottingham, Pwllheli (until 2001), Shrewsbury, Smethwick Soho TMD, Leamington Spa, Wolverhampton and Worcester Shrub Hill

== Performance ==
Considering the difficulties with which Central Trains contended, including sharing tracks with so many other operators, it did not perform too badly in its twilight months. The last figures released by the ORR (Office of Rail Regulation) rated Central Trains' performance at 84.8% for the PPM (Public Performance Measure) over the third quarter of the financial year 2007/8. This was an improvement over the same period the previous year, during which they achieved 82.7%. Their final MAA was 86.6%.

== Rolling stock ==
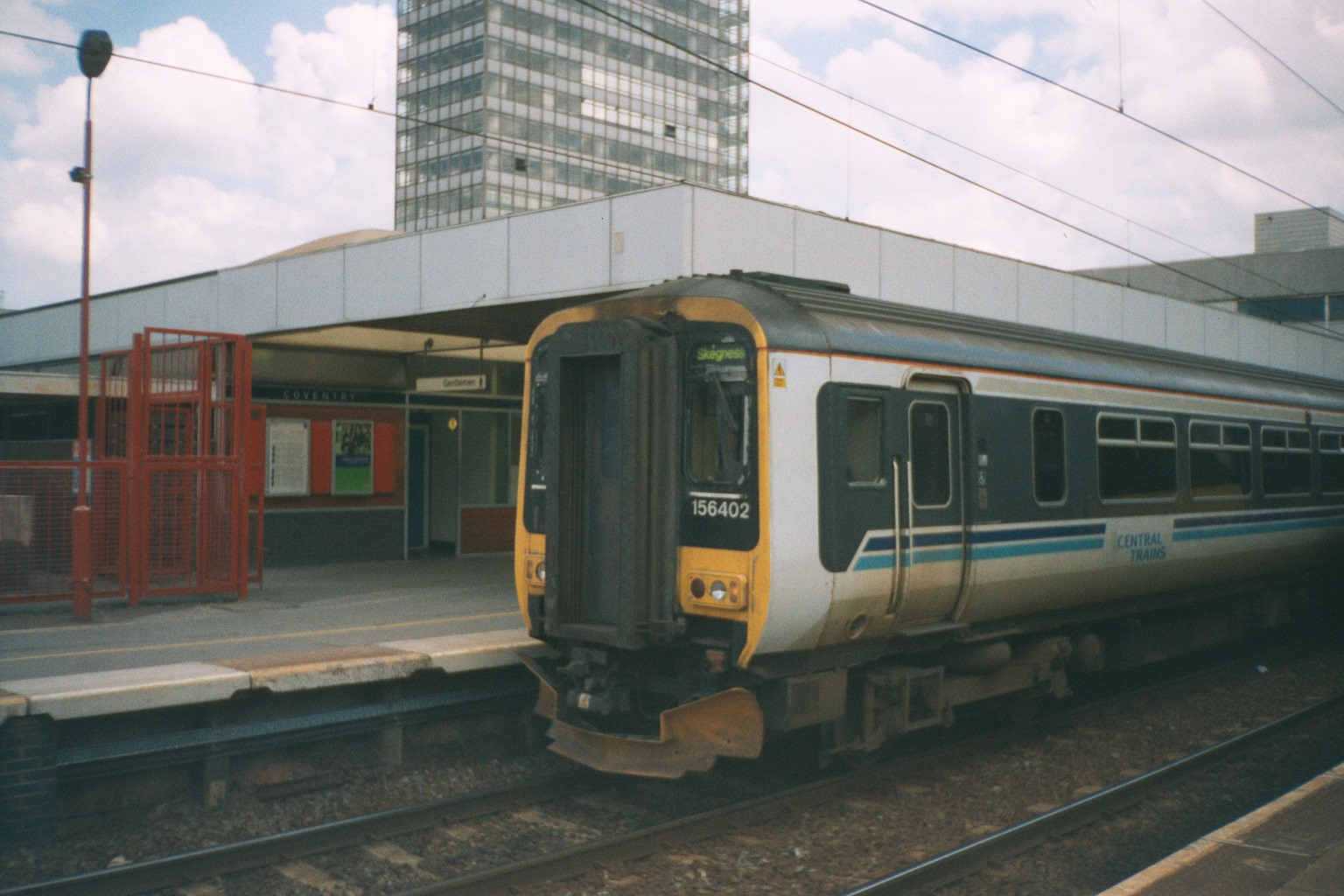
Central Trains' 156402 in Regional Railways livery at Coventry in 2000. The direct service from Coventry to Skegness ceased in 2004.

Central Trains' fleet was primarily made up of diesel multiple unit trains, with an additional fleet of electric trains in use around Birmingham.

The awarding of the franchise was soon followed by multiple orders for a total of 33 new air-conditioned, 100 mph Turbostar trains, intended to boost the fleet and replace older rolling stock. Though a large number of 1980s and 1990s diesel multiple unit trains inherited from British Rail remained, the last 1960s and 70s 'slam door' trains had been retired by 2000.

Over the course of the franchise, a number of the older Class 156 and Class 158 trains were transferred away to other operators including Wales & Borders and One. This was balanced by the acquisition of additional Turbostar trains no longer required by sister company Midland Mainline as well as additional Class 150 and Class 158 units made surplus by other operators. Over the years, both Class 150 and 158 trains were shuffled between two and three carriage formations to meet changing needs.

The Strategic Rail Authority decision to divert rolling stock originally intended for South West Trains also saw the company benefit from a fleet of 30 new 100 mph Class 350 Desiro units, which were shared with Silverlink for use on the West Coast Main Line between Euston and Northampton/Liverpool via Tamworth.

Rolling stock in 1997 consisted entirely of trains inherited from British Rail. Some, such as Class 310 and Class 312 trains were in the process of withdrawal at privatisation. By the final months of the franchise, Central Trains had a significantly more modern fleet. It was also supplementing its fleet with Class 321 and new Class 350 electric trains shared with sister company Silverlink.

=== Fleet at start of franchise ===
Rolling stock in 1997 consisted entirely of trains inherited from British Rail. Some, such as Class 310 and Class 312 trains were in the process of withdrawal at privatisation.

Class	Image	Type	Top speed		Number	Routes operated	Built
Class	Image	Type	mph	km/h	Number	Routes operated	Built
150 Sprinter		DMU	75	120	29× 2 car 9× 3 car	Some Centro services. Dorridge/Shirley/Stratford Upon Avon/Leamington Spa – Worcester/Great Malvern/Hereford. Some non Centro routes Crewe to Skegness, Derby to Matlock and Nottingham to Worksop	1984–1987
153 Super Sprinter		DMU	75	120	21	Lincolnshire and Mid Wales rural services, Stourbridge branch line, Skegness to Crewe & Derby to Matlock and Nottingham to Birmingham New Street/Shrewsbury via Derby	1987–1988
156 Super Sprinter		DMU	75	120	20	Aberystwyth and Chester to Birmingham New Street, Hereford to Birmingham New Street, Birmingham New Street to Leicester, Nottingham, Lincoln Central & Grimsby Town, Nottingham to Worksop, Crewe to Skegness.	1987–1989
158 Express Sprinter		DMU	90	145	36	Norwich to Liverpool, Stansted to Birmingham, Nottingham to Cardiff, Grimsby to Birmingham, Birmingham to Liverpool	1989–1992
310		EMU	75	121	10	Already being withdrawn at privatisation, remained as backup for the newly introduced Class 323.	1966
312		EMU	90	145	4	Already being withdrawn at privatisation, remained as backup for the newly introduced Class 323.	1976
323		EMU	90	145	26	Cross City Line	1992–1995

=== Fleet at end of franchise ===
By the final months of the franchise, Central Trains had a significantly more modern fleet. It was also supplementing its fleet with Class 321 and new Class 350 electric trains shared with sister company Silverlink.

Class	Image	Type	Top speed		Number	Usual routes operated	Built
Class	Image	Type	mph	km/h	Number	Usual routes operated	Built
150 Sprinter		DMU	75	120	18× 2 car 18× 3 car	Non-electric services for Network West Midlands, plus some services to Worcester, Malvern and Hereford.	1984–1987
153 Super Sprinter		DMU	75	120	16	Lincolnshire rural services, Coventry–Nuneaton and Stourbridge branch line.	1987–1988
156 Super Sprinter		DMU	75	120	10	Middle-distance services, mainly in the East Midlands.	1987–1989
158 Express Sprinter		DMU	90	145	13× 2 car 8× 3 car	Middle-distance services and some Citylink duties.	1989–1992
170 Turbostar		DMU	100	160	31× 2 car 22× 3 car	Citylink services and general use across the franchise area.	1999–2002
321		EMU	100	160	37 (Shared with Silverlink)	Birmingham – Northampton	1990–1991
323		EMU	90	145	26	Cross City Line	1992–1995
350/1 Desiro		EMU	100	160	30 (Shared with Silverlink)	Electrified Citylink services from Birmingham	2004–2005

== Franchise cessation ==
In October 2004, the Department for Transport unveiled plans designed to streamline rail franchises which included the abolition of the Central Trains franchise and the transfer of its services to other operators. It was announced that the franchise would end in April 2007, although there was a later extension until November 2007).

On 11 November 2007, Central Trains ceased to exist and its services transferred to three new train operating companies:

- Local and urban services around the West Midlands were merged with former Silverlink Country services to form London Midland (now West Midlands Trains).
- The Liverpool – Nottingham – Norwich service (which had been threatened with a split) and local trains in the East Midlands were combined with Midland Mainline services to form East Midlands Trains (now East Midlands Railway).
- The Cardiff – Birmingham – Nottingham and Birmingham – Stansted Airport Citylink services, were merged with former Virgin CrossCountry services (minus Birmingham/Manchester to Scotland services) to form CrossCountry

Preceded by Regional Railways; As part of British Rail	Operator of Central Trains franchise 1997–2007	Succeeded by CrossCountry; New CrossCountry franchise
Preceded by Regional Railways; As part of British Rail	Operator of Central Trains franchise 1997–2007	Succeeded by London Midland; West Midlands franchise
Preceded by Regional Railways; As part of British Rail	Operator of Central Trains franchise 1997–2007	Succeeded by East Midlands Trains; East Midlands franchise
