= Wales & West =

British train operator 1996 to 2001

- Wales & West Class 153 at Plymouth in May 2001

Overview
- Franchises: Wales & West; 13 October 1996 – 13 October 2001
- Main regions: Wales, South West England
- Other regions: West Midlands, North West
- Parent company: National Express
- Reporting mark: WW
- Successor: Wales and Borders; Wessex Trains

Technical
- Length: 1,569 miles (2,525 km)

Wales & West was a British train operating company that operated the South Wales & West franchise from 1996 until 2001.

The franchise was operated by Prism Rail from October 1996 until July 2000, when the firm was taken over by National Express. The company ceased to operate trains in October 2001, following a reorganisation of rail franchises.

== Operations ==
Originally privatised under the name South Wales and West Railway, the company operated a network of local and middle-distance services in South Wales and the south west of England. These ranged from rural services in Cornwall and Pembrokeshire to urban commuter services in the Bristol area.

Longer-distance services operated under the Alphaline brand provided regular links to North Wales and the north west of England, as well as to the South Coast and London Waterloo.

Wales & West received considerable government subsidy. The first full financial year (1997/98) was supported by a payment of £70.9 million, with expenditure due to reduce to £38.1 million for its final trading year of 2003/04. The provisional claim from British Rail for the year 1996/97 had been £84.8 million, including an administered profit of £4.8 million.

== Rolling stock ==
Wales & West inherited a fleet of Class 143, Class 150, Class 153 and Class 158s from British Rail. Wales & West also hired-in some locomotive-hauled trains on occasion.

Class	Image	Type	Top speed		Built
Class	Image	Type	mph	km/h	Built
Class 143 Pacer		Diesel multiple unit	75	120	1985–1986
Class 150 Sprinter		Diesel multiple unit	75	120	1984–1987
Class 153 Super Sprinter		Diesel multiple unit	75	120	1987–1988
Class 158 Express Sprinter		Diesel multiple unit	90	145	1989–1992

Wales & West's fleet was maintained at Cardiff Canton and Exeter depots.

== Enhancements ==
Wales & West carried out various enhancements to their 78-vehicle Class 158 fleet including new carpets, internal repainting and upgrades to air conditioning equipment. Seating was replaced throughout, with a revised layout offering a greater proportion of seats at tables and fewer airline-style seats.

One member of the Class 158 fleet was used to trial additional safety features. This included an airline-style lighting strip along the carriage aisle leading to the exits and illuminated arrows above internal doorways. In time, most of the company's trains also received an automated system of pre-recorded safety announcements.

Prism Rail also gave an undertaking to install passenger information displays at 205 stations. This ambitious project went on to cost Prism significantly more than expected, with no chance of recouping its investment – but the commitment was upheld and the project completed. Even the remote Sugar Loaf station that typically receives fewer than 100 passengers per year was equipped.

Other improvements committed to included:

- Raising punctuality targets from 90% to 92%
- Raising reliability targets from 99% to 99.5%
- Station improvements including waiting shelters and personal security features
- Re-staffing seven stations for an experimental period of 12 months

== Corporate identity ==
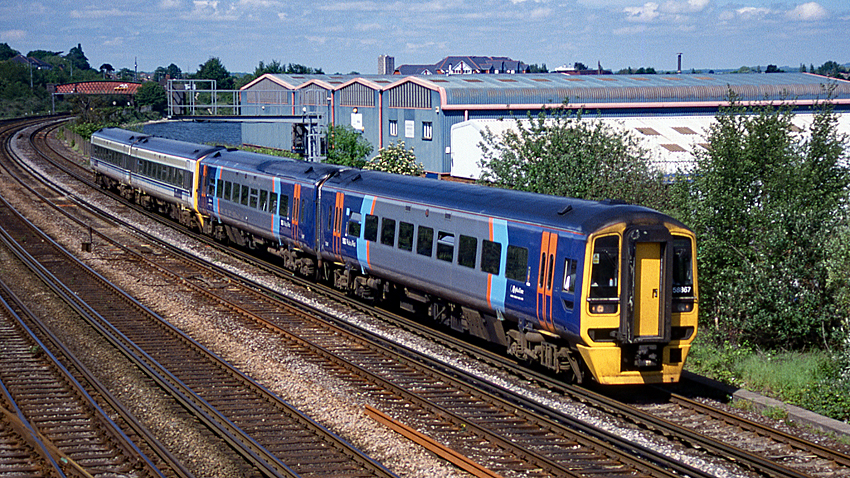
158867 in experimental livery, 2002

By the end of the 1990s, the company had started to develop its own vehicle liveries to replace those inherited from Regional Railways. An experimental silver, blue and orange livery carried by 158867 evolved into a dedicated silver and navy livery for the flagship Alphaline fleet. The rest of the fleet began to receive an array of different promotional liveries featuring locations from the company's operating area.

The shortened Wales and West name was adopted to replace the original identity of South Wales & West Railway, with various updates to the company logo taking place.

=== Logos ===
Initial logotype in use on vehicle branding

Initial version of revised 'Wales and West' identity

== Demise ==
In 2000 the Strategic Rail Authority announced its intention that a single all-Wales franchise should take over the majority of rail services in Wales. Accordingly, the Wales and West brand was withdrawn in October 2001 and services were redistributed between franchises and rebranded as follows:

- The Valley Lines franchisee, Cardiff Railway Company Ltd, took on responsibility for most of Wales & West's services in Wales and changed its principal trading name to Wales and Borders Trains.
- Other services primarily focused on south west England remained with Wales and West Passenger Trains Ltd. which changed its trading name to Wessex Trains.

Preceded by Regional Railways; As part of British Rail	Operator of Wales & West franchise 1996–2001	Succeeded by Wales and Borders; Wales & Borders franchise
Preceded by Regional Railways; As part of British Rail	Operator of Wales & West franchise 1996–2001	Succeeded by Wessex Trains; Wessex Trains franchise
