= Alphaline =

1994-2006 brand of Regional Railways

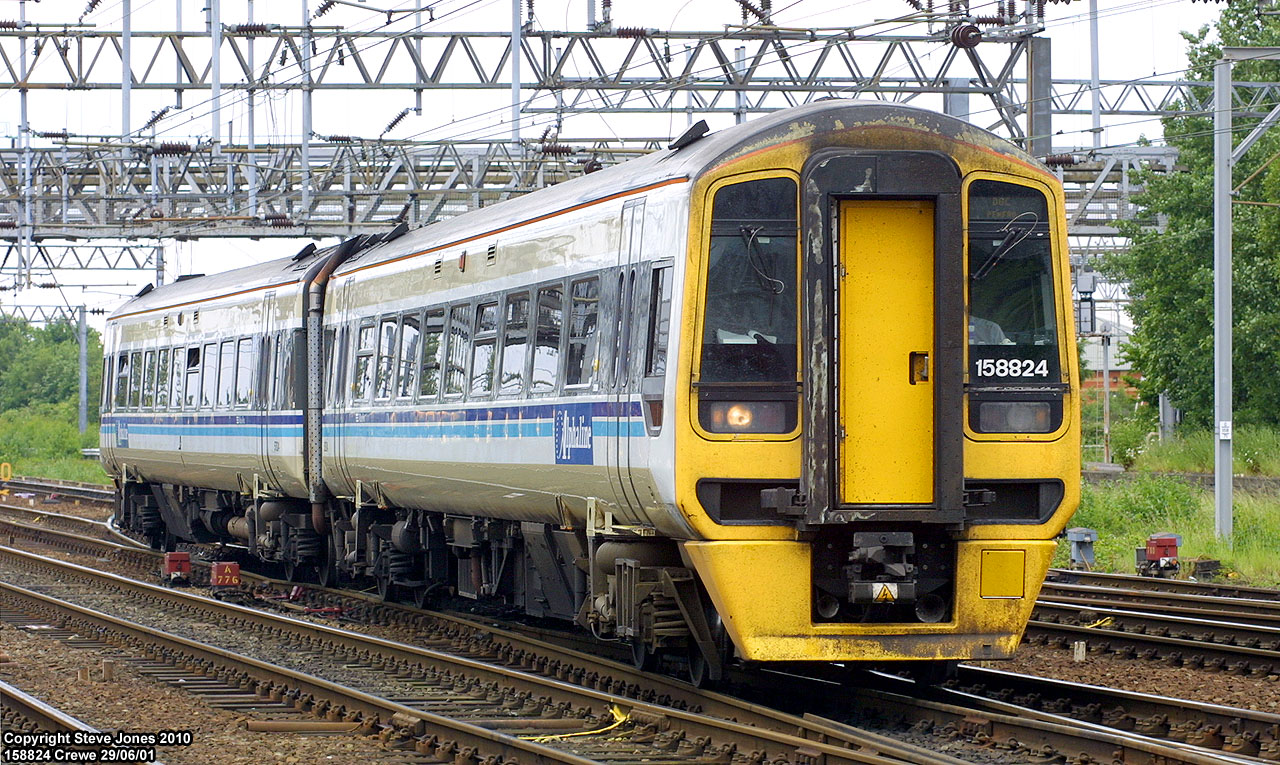
- British Rail Class 158 with Regional Railways Alphaline branding in 2001

Overview
- Main regions: North West England, Midlands, Wales, South West England
- Other regions: London, South East England
- Parent company: Regional Railways
- Dates of operation: 1994–2006

Alphaline was a brand introduced by Regional Railways in December 1994 to differentiate certain provincial express trains with enhanced passenger accommodation from general regional and middle-distance services operated by older rolling stock.

== Origins ==
The Alphaline brand was introduced in December 1994 on express services operated by Regional Railways in the Midlands, Wales and the South West. These services linked various provincial towns and cities, complementing and connecting with the more prestigious InterCity network.

Branding was applied specifically to services scheduled for operation by recently built Class 158s. The association of a passenger-facing brand with a specific model of train was unusual, but reflected the significantly improved passenger facilities such trains provided when compared with the mainstay of the Regional Railways fleet.

Timetables advertised Alphaline services as providing:

- Reserved seats available
- At-seat trolley service of cold snacks, sandwiches and hot and cold drinks available for all or part of the journey
- British Telecom card phone
- Air-conditioning

Within the Regional Railways fleet of the early to mid-1990s, the latter two facilities were a rarity and available solely on Class 158 Express Sprinters.

Advertising for the brand used the tagline Nice and straightforward indicating to customers the heightened levels of comfort and ease of booking the direct services available.

== Post-Privatisation ==
Regional Railways successors Central Trains and South Wales & West Railway inherited Alphaline routes and both initially retained the brand. It ceased to be used in 2006. A remnant of the brand appeared in the form of the symbol being included in the Network Rail timetable in February 2009 and even in the winter 2014 National Rail timetable, the guide to reserving seats included the Alphaline symbol in the list of symbols denoting a train with reservable seats.

=== Central Trains ===
In the early days of the franchise, Central Trains continued to mark express services as Alphaline within its timetables. By 2001 however, the brand had disappeared from timetables and the company went on to develop its own Citylink brand.

=== Wales & West ===
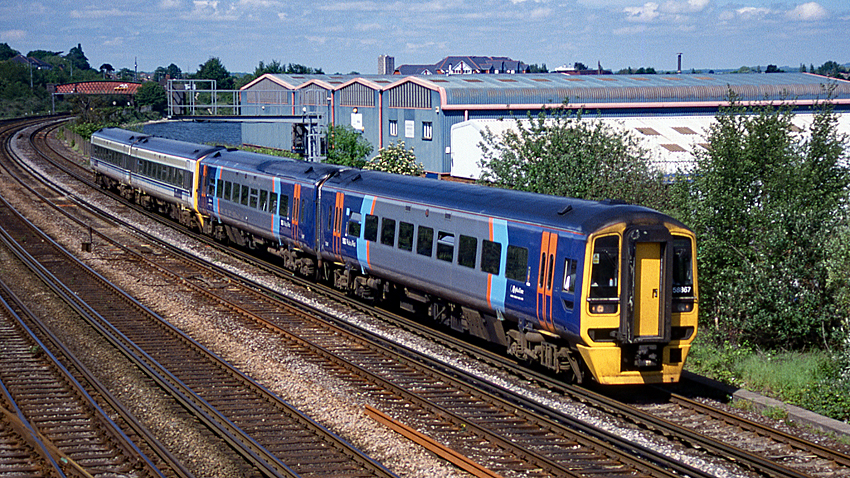
158867 in Wales & West's earliest experimental Alphaline livery in May 2002

Wales & West used the Alphaline brand throughout its existence and went as far as applying the brand to the livery of its trains. Originally adding a vinyl logo to the Express Sprinter colour scheme of its Class 158, the company later introduced a silver livery that included a full-height Alphaline logo on the side of the carriage.

=== Wales and Borders ===
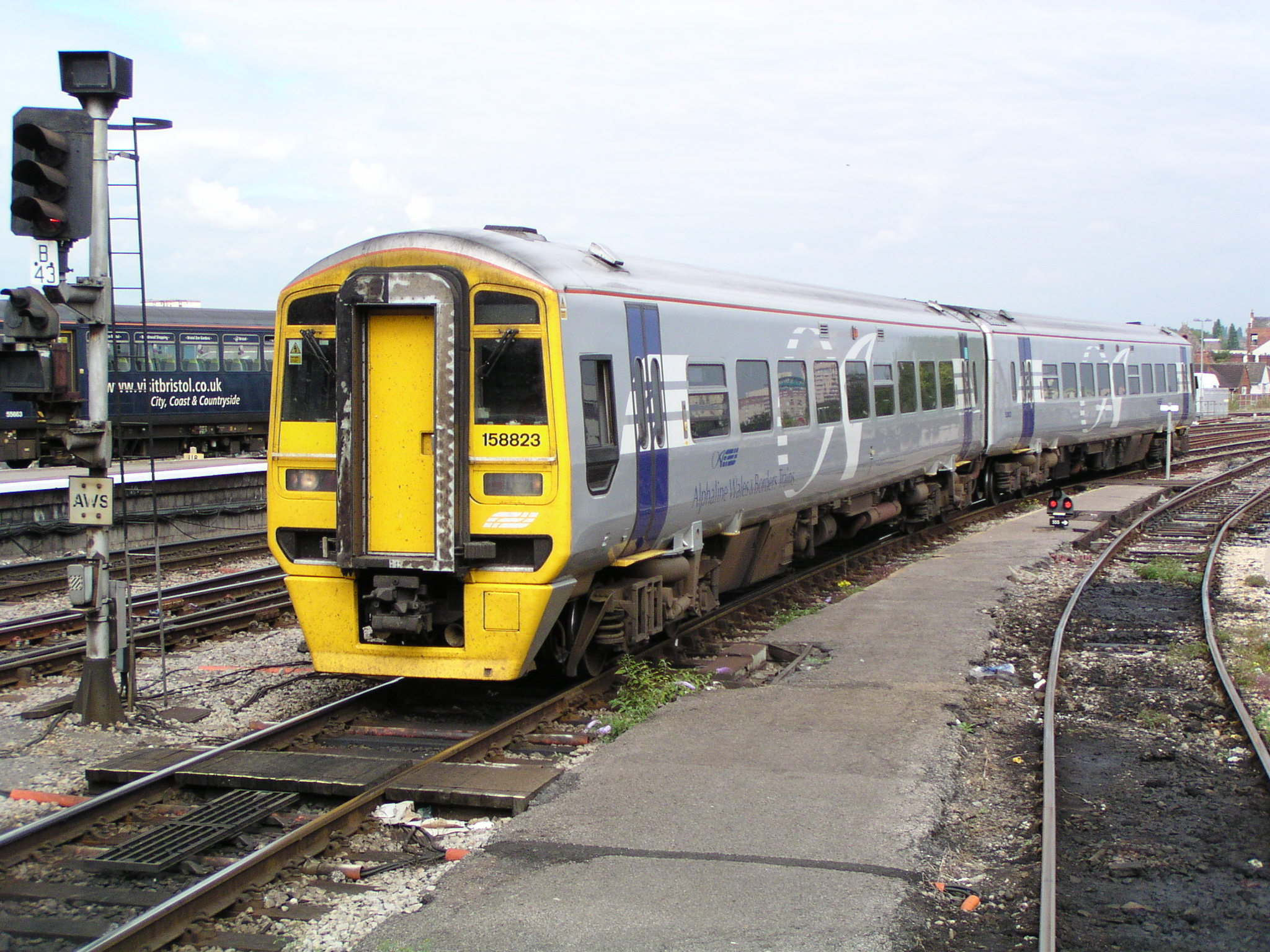
158823 in Wales and Borders Alphaline livery in September 2003

In 2001, Wales & West was divided into two as part of the creation of the Wales & Borders franchise; the company that took on services in Wales became known as Wales and Borders. As well as retaining Alphaline branding on existing routes, it also re-introduced the brand to the Cambrian Line services that it took over from Central Trains. This lasted until December 2003, when the new franchise was taken over by Arriva Trains Wales and Alphaline branding was quickly removed. Despite this, Arriva Trains Wales continued to operate Alphaline services into 2004.

=== Wessex Trains ===
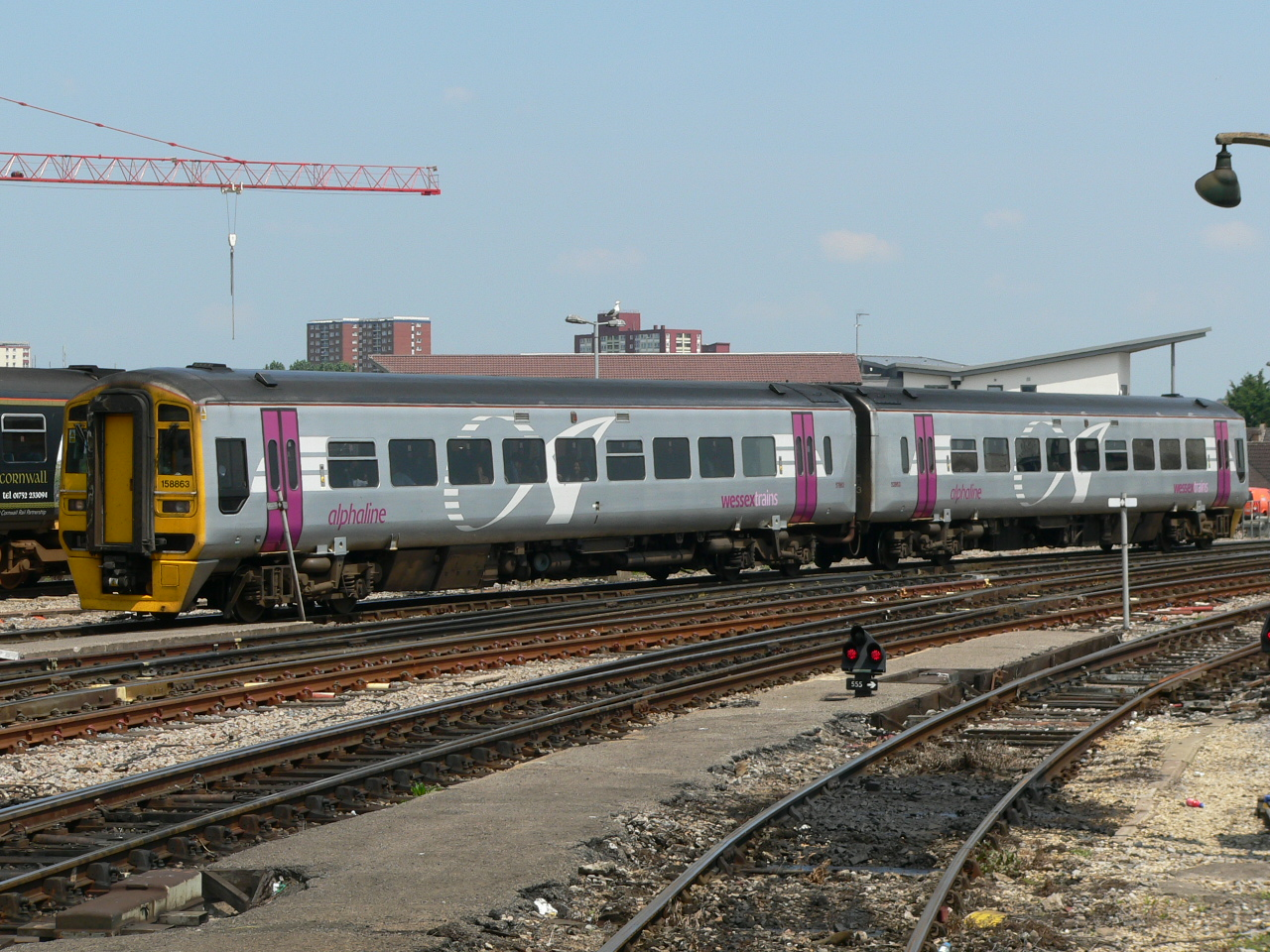
158863 in Wessex Trains Alphaline livery in June 2005

Upon its creation from the South West England services of Wales & West in 2001, Wessex Trains also retained the Alphaline brand. The company also continued to repaint newly acquired Class 158 units in the silver Alphaline livery - although it changed the colour of the passenger entrance doors from navy to either claret or purple in an attempt to distinguish itself from Wales & Borders.

By late 2004, Wessex Trains was the only company continuing to use the Alphaline brand. The brand was finally dropped after Wessex Trains was absorbed into the Greater Western franchise in 2006 with First Great Western not continuing the brand's use.
