= Regional Railways =

Former passenger sector of British Rail

- Provincial

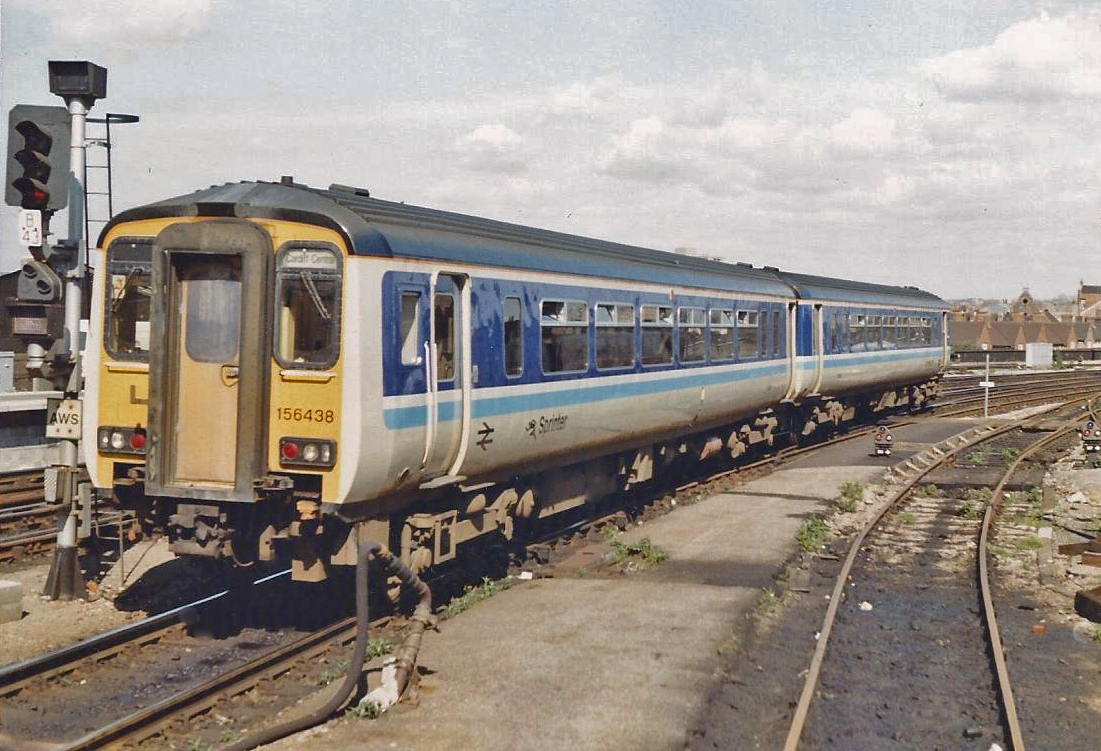
- A Class 156 at Bristol Temple Meads (May 1989)

Overview
- Main regions: East Anglia, North West England, North East England, Wales, South West England
- Other regions: East Midlands, Merseyside, Scotland, West Midlands
- Parent company: British Rail
- Dates of operation: 1982–1997
- Successors: Central Trains, North Western Trains, Midland Mainline, Merseyrail Electrics, South Wales and West Railway, Valley Lines, Regional Railways North East, ScotRail (National Express)

Regional Railways (originally Provincial) was one of three passenger sectors of British Rail. It was created in 1982 and was the most subsidised (per passenger km) of the three sectors; upon formation, its costs were four times its revenue. The sector was broken up into eight franchises during the privatisation of British Rail and ceased to exist on 31 March 1997.

== Formation ==
Upon sectorisation in 1982, three passenger sectors were created: InterCity, operating principal express services; London & South East (renamed Network SouthEast in 1986) operating commuter services in the London area, and Provincial (renamed Regional Railways in 1989) responsible for all other passenger services. In the metropolitan counties, local services were managed by the Passenger Transport Executives.

== Services ==
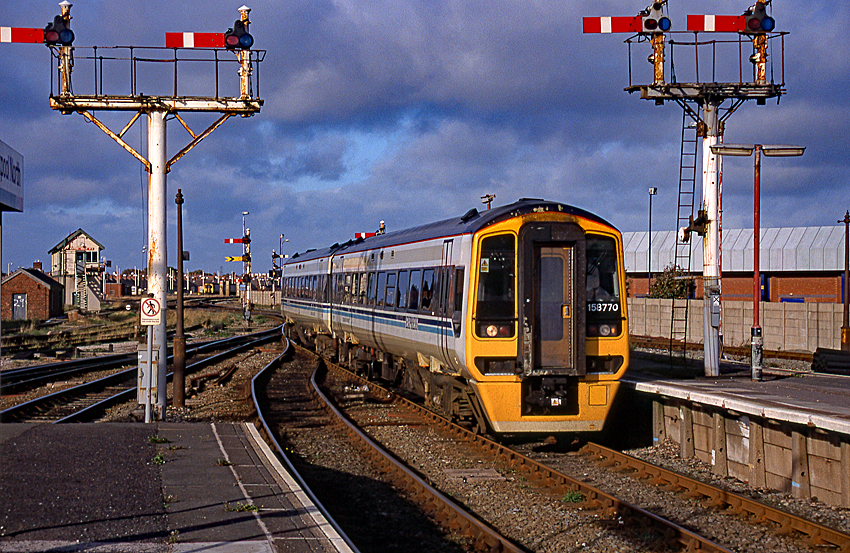
A Class 158 in Regional Railways' Express livery at Blackpool North (1998)

Regional Railways inherited a diverse range of routes, comprising both express and local services. Expresses mainly ran to non-principal destinations or on less popular routes, such as Birmingham or Liverpool to Norwich, or Liverpool to Scarborough, and were chiefly operated by older locomotives and second-hand InterCity coaches. Later, these services were operated by Sprinter units – mainly Class 158 on express services. There were also the internal Scottish Region local services and expresses, the latter including the Edinburgh-Glasgow push-pull service.

Local services ran on both main lines and branch lines and were often operated by first generation diesel multiple units dating back to the 1950s. Longer distance trains were often formed of older coaches and locomotives of Class 31, Class 40 and Class 45, which were of a similar vintage.

=== Alphaline ===
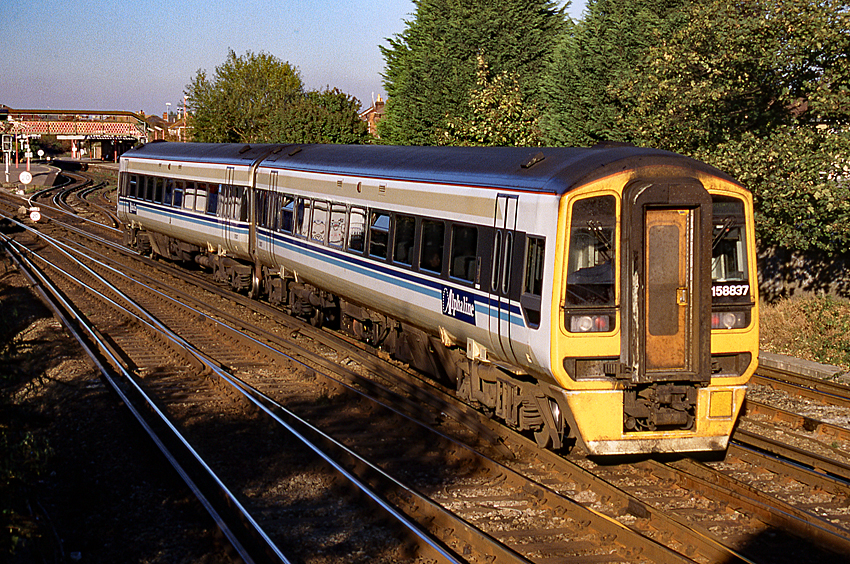
A Class 158 unit with Regional Railways' Alphaline branding (October 1997)

The Alphaline brand was introduced in December 1994 on express services operated by Regional Railways in the Midlands, Wales and the South West. These services linked various provincial towns and cities, complementing and connecting with the more prestigious InterCity network.

== Development of new rolling stock ==
In the early 1980s, large numbers of first generation diesel multiple units (DMUs) and locomotive-hauled coaches were found to contain asbestos. Removing it would be a considerable cost while generating no extra revenue; coupled with the increasingly unreliable old locomotives and DMUs, this prompted BR to look for a new generation of diesel multiple units.

The prototype Class 210, in service on a trial basis since 1981, was considered too expensive to be put into production, so British Rail (BR) looked elsewhere for new designs.

=== Pacer (train) ===
The first design, the Pacer, used bus technology from the Leyland National, in classes numbered in the 14x range. Not long after their introduction to service, large numbers of them suffered from a number of technical problems, particularly with their gearboxes. In Cornwall, it was found that their long wheelbase caused intolerable squealing noises and high tyre wear on tight curves; they were quickly replaced by the old DMUs. The solution lay elsewhere, although, after much modification, the Pacers eventually proved themselves in traffic.

=== Sprinters ===
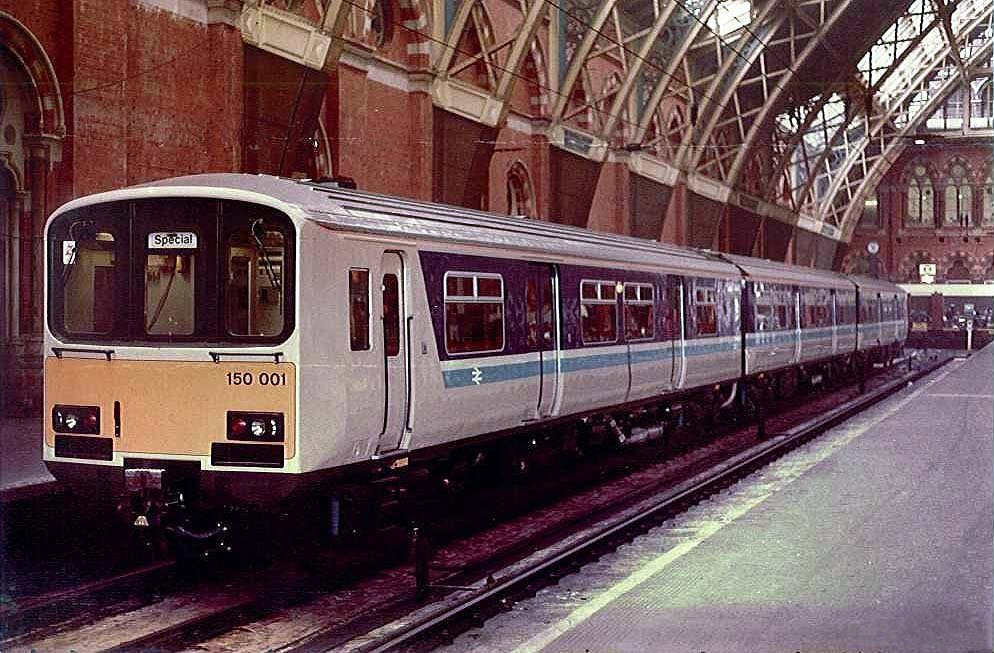
A Class 150 at St Pancras after a publicity run (1985)

BR needed something midway between the Pacers and the Class 210s. In 1984/1985, two experimental DMU designs were put into service: BREL-built Class 150 and Metro-Cammell-built Class 151. Both of these used hydraulic transmission and were less bus-like than the Pacers. After trials, Class 150 was selected for production, entering service from 1987. Reliability was much improved by the new units, with depot visits being reduced from two or three times a week to fortnightly.

The late 1980s and early 1990s also saw the development of secondary express services that complemented the main line InterCity routes. Class 155 and Class 156 Super Sprinters were developed to replace locomotive-hauled trains on these services; their interiors were designed with longer distance journeys in mind. Key Scottish and trans-Pennine routes were upgraded with new Class 158 Express Sprinters, while a network of Alphaline services was introduced elsewhere in the country.

By the end of the 1980s, passenger numbers had increased and costs had been reduced to two-and-a-half times revenue.

=== Electrification ===
The Class 323 electric multiple units were built by Hunslet Transportation Projects and Holec Ridderkerk between 1992 and 1995, although mock-ups and prototypes were built and tested in 1990 and 1991. Forty-three 3-car units were built for inner-suburban services in and around Birmingham and Manchester, including the Cross-City Line in the Birmingham area and services to the new Manchester Airport station.

== Rolling stock ==
| Class | Image | Quantity | Formation | Notes |
Locomotive-hauled stock
| Class 31 | | | Diesel locomotive | |
| Class 37 | | | Diesel locomotive | |
| Class 47 | Class 47 Diesel Locomotive (27975307854) | | Diesel locomotive | |
| Mark 1 | | | Coach | |
| Mark 2 | | | Coach | |
| Mark 3 | | | Coach | |
Diesel multiple units
| Class 101 | | 35 | 2, 3 or 4 | |
| Class 117 | 27.07.91 Boston Class 117 (52252218462) | 3 | 3 | |
| Class 121 | | 26 | 1 | |
| Class 122 | | 29 | 1 | |
| Class 142; Pacer | Saltburn railway station | 96 | 2 | 60 units scrapped, 31 units preserved, 4 units converted for off-railway use |
| Class 143; Pacer | | 25 | 2 | 11 units preserved, 12 units scrapped, 2 units converted to non-railway use. |
| Class 150; Sprinter | | 137 | 2 or 3 | 12 units equiv. scrapped, 1 unit preserved |
| Class 151; Sprinter | | 2 | 3 | Both scrapped |
| Class 153; Sprinter | | 70 | 1 | 12 units scrapped, 2 units converted to non-railway use, 1 unit preserved, 3 units converted to non-passenger use. |
| Class 154; Sprinter | | 1 | 2 | A converted Class 150, later converted back. |
| Class 155; Super Sprinter | | 47 | 2 | |
| Class 156; Super Sprinter | | 114 | 2 | |
| Class 158; Express Sprinter | | 182 | 2 or 3 | |
Electric multiple units
| Class 304 | | 45 | 4 | All scrapped |
| Class 305 | | | 3 or 4 | All scrapped |
| Class 323 | | 43 | 3 | |

== Liveries ==
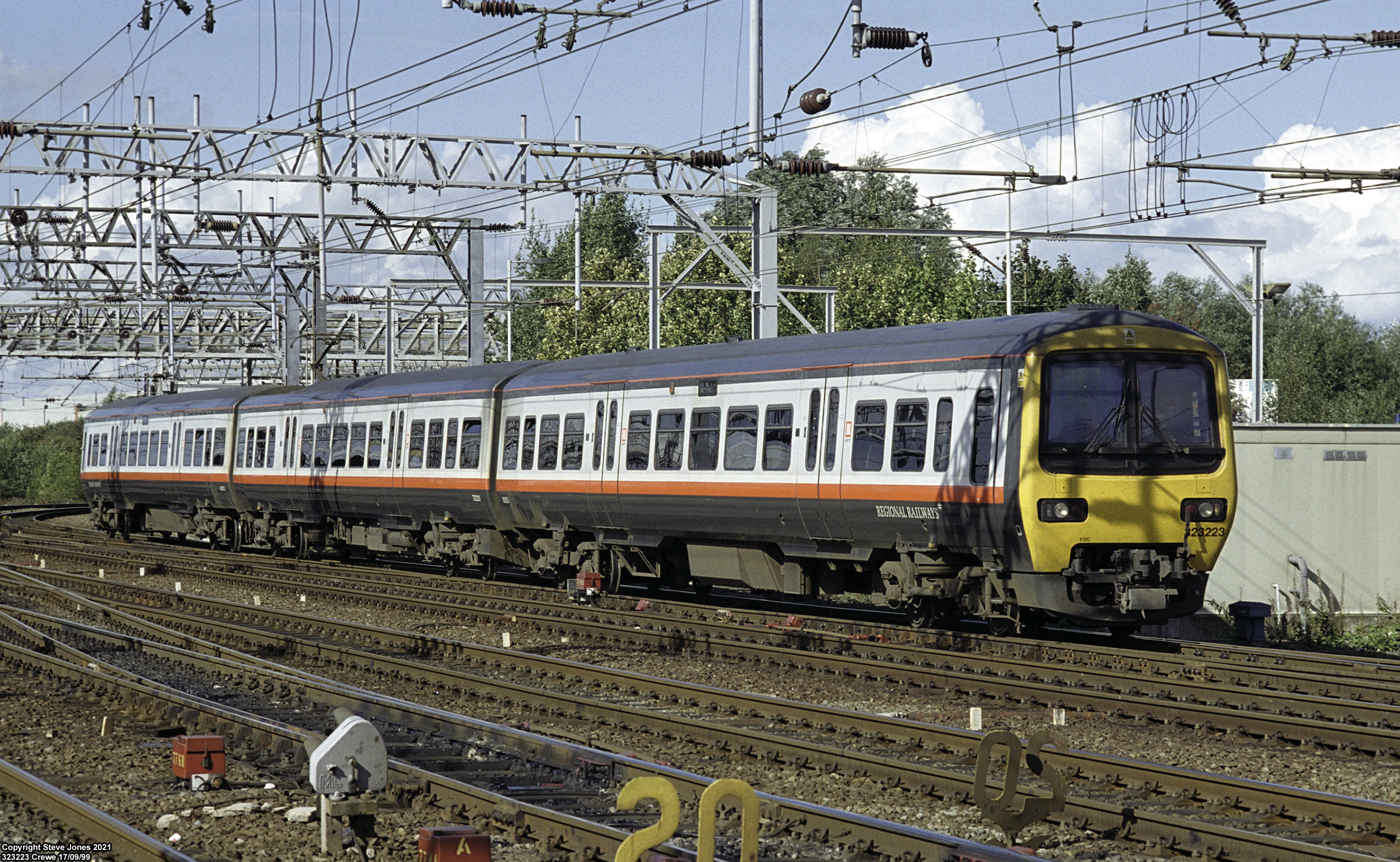
A Class 323 EMU in GMPTE livery

Initially, many vehicles carried standard British Rail blue livery.

From 1986, Provincial adopted a version of the prototype Class 150 livery: aircraft blue over white, with a light blue stripe at waist level. All new units, plus a few existing ones, such as selected Class 304 EMUs, received it. Some units and coaches received the livery with either ScotRail or Regional Railways branding. In the North West, the light blue stripe was replaced with a mid-green one on Class 156 refurbishments from 1995 to 1998.

The Class 158s, introduced in 1989, appeared in Express livery: dark grey window surrounds over light grey, with light and dark blue stripes at waist level. Later, Alphaline would replace the Express wording; this colour scheme was also applied to some Class 156 units around privatisation.

The Class 323 EMUs introduced in 1994 appeared in West Midlands Passenger Transport Executive (WMPTE) Centro livery for its units and Greater Manchester Passenger Transport Executive (GMPTE) livery for Manchester-based sets.

After privatisation, many vehicles continued to carry the basic Regional Railways colour scheme, but with the addition of different branding, e.g. Central Trains.

The final British railway vehicle to carry Regional Railways livery was a Class 153, which was repainted in July 2008 into East Midlands Trains' colours.

== Split for privatisation ==
As part of the process of privatisation between 1994 and 1997, Regional Railways was split into several different shadow train operating units, which later became independent train operating companies:

| Train Operating Unit | Routes |
|---|---|
| Anglia Railways | Routes in East Anglia (combined with InterCity services in the region) |
| Valley Lines | Urban 'Valley Lines' services around Cardiff, previously integrated within the South Wales and West divisions |
| Central Trains | Regional Railways' Central division, minus the services transferred to Anglia Railways and the Oxford to Worcester service. Covered the Midlands of England and mid-Wales |
| Merseyrail Electrics | The network of electrified routes centred on Liverpool |
| North Western Trains | Routes in North West England and in North Wales |
| Regional Railways North East | Routes in the North East of England. |
| ScotRail (National Express) | The vast majority of services within Scotland |
| South Wales and West Railway | A wide network of services centred on South Wales and South West England |
