= Wales and Borders =

Welsh train operating company, 2001-2003

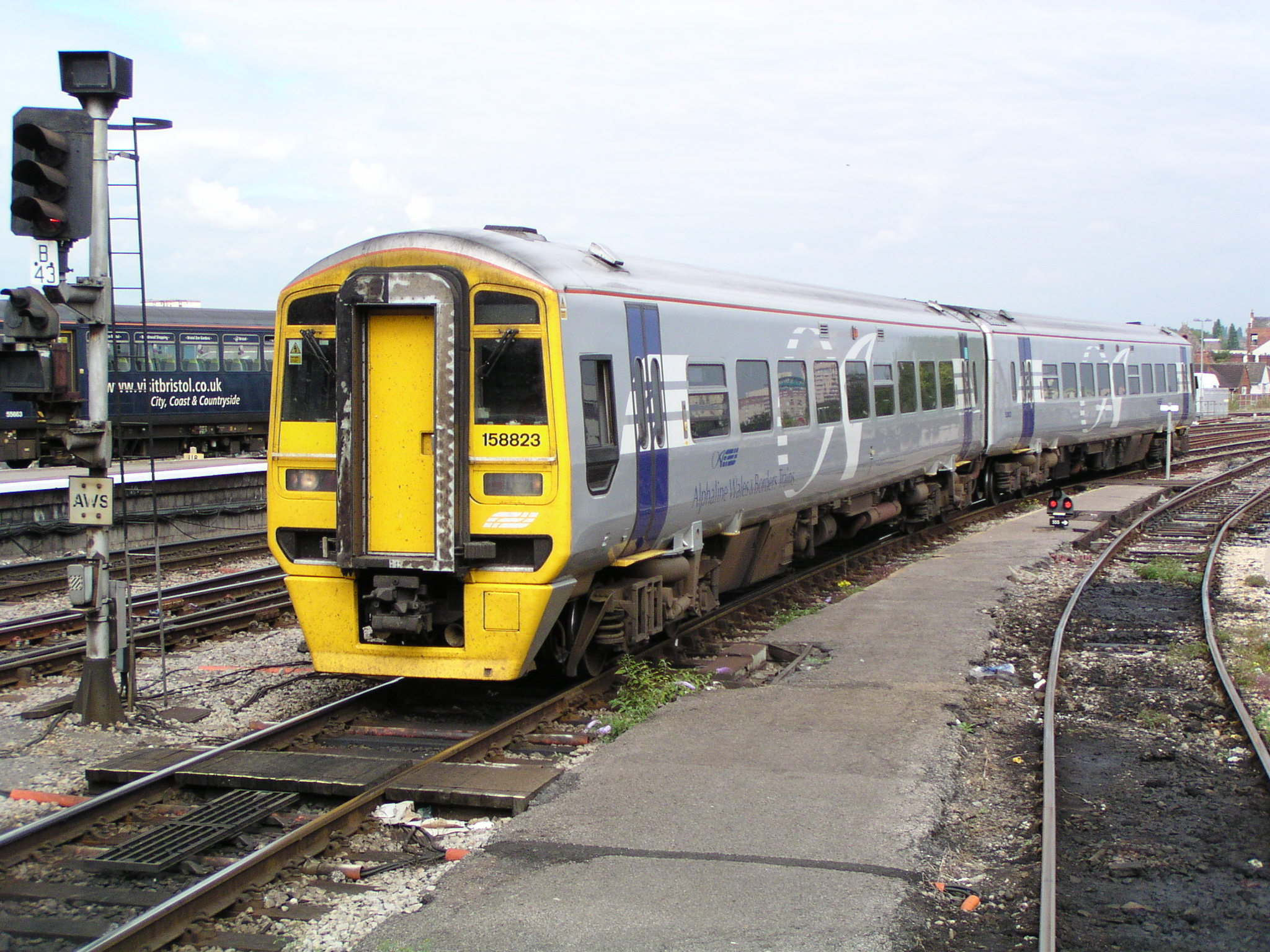
- Class 158 Express Sprinter at Bristol Temple Meads in 2003

Overview
- Franchises: Wales & Borders; 14 October 2001 – 6 December 2003
- Main regions: South Wales, Mid Wales
- Other region: West Country
- Parent company: National Express
- Reporting mark: WB
- Predecessors: Valley Lines, Wales & West
- Successor: Arriva Trains Wales

Wales and Borders was a Welsh train operating company owned by National Express that operated the Wales & Borders franchise from October 2001 until December 2003.

== History ==
In October 1996, the Valley Lines franchise commenced operating services around Cardiff and the South Wales Valleys. In August 2000, the Strategic Rail Authority decided to re-organise the Valley Lines and Wales & West franchises.

Valley Lines became Wales & Borders from October 2001, being operated by National Express, combining its services with most of Wales & West's Welsh services and the Cambrian Line services from Central Trains. In September 2003 Wales & Borders took over the North Wales Coast Line services from First North Western.

== Services ==
Wales and Borders operated passenger services in Wales and the West Country as seen in their route map, retaining the Alphaline branding on longer services. It also operated services to Liverpool Lime Street, Manchester Piccadilly, Birmingham International, Penzance and London Waterloo.

On 14 October 2001, the services from Birmingham New Street to Chester, Aberystwyth, and Pwllheli operated by Central Trains were transferred to Wales and Borders.

On 28 September 2003, the services from Birmingham New Street, Crewe and Manchester Piccadilly to Llandudno and Holyhead as well as those between Bidston and Wrexham Central and Llandudno and Blaenau Ffestiniog operated by First North Western were also transferred to Wales and Borders.

== Rolling stock ==
Wales and Borders Class 150 in Ex-Regional railways (2001)

Wales and Borders inherited a fleet of Class 142, Class 143 and Class 150s from Valley Lines and Class 158s from Wales & West and Central Trains. From First North Western it inherited Class 153 and Class 175s.

Wales and Borders also used Mark 2 carriages on Rhymney Line and Fishguard Harbour services hauled by English Welsh & Scottish EWS Class 37s and Mark 2 carriages hauled by English Welsh & Scottish Class 47s on North Wales Coast Line services.

== Depot ==
Wales and Borders' fleet was maintained at Cardiff Canton depot.

== Demise ==
On 1 August 2003, the Strategic Rail Authority awarded the new franchise to Arriva with the services operated by Wales & Borders transferring to Arriva Trains Wales on 7 December 2003.

Preceded by First North Western; North West Regional Railways franchise (North Wales Coast services)	Operator of Wales & Borders franchise 2001–2003	Succeeded by Arriva Trains Wales
Preceded by Valley Lines; Valley Lines franchise	Operator of Wales & Borders franchise 2001–2003	Succeeded by Arriva Trains Wales
Preceded by Wales & West; Wales & West franchise	Operator of Wales & Borders franchise 2001–2003	Succeeded by Arriva Trains Wales
