= British Rail Class 153 =

British class of diesel railcars

British Rail Class 153 Super Sprinter
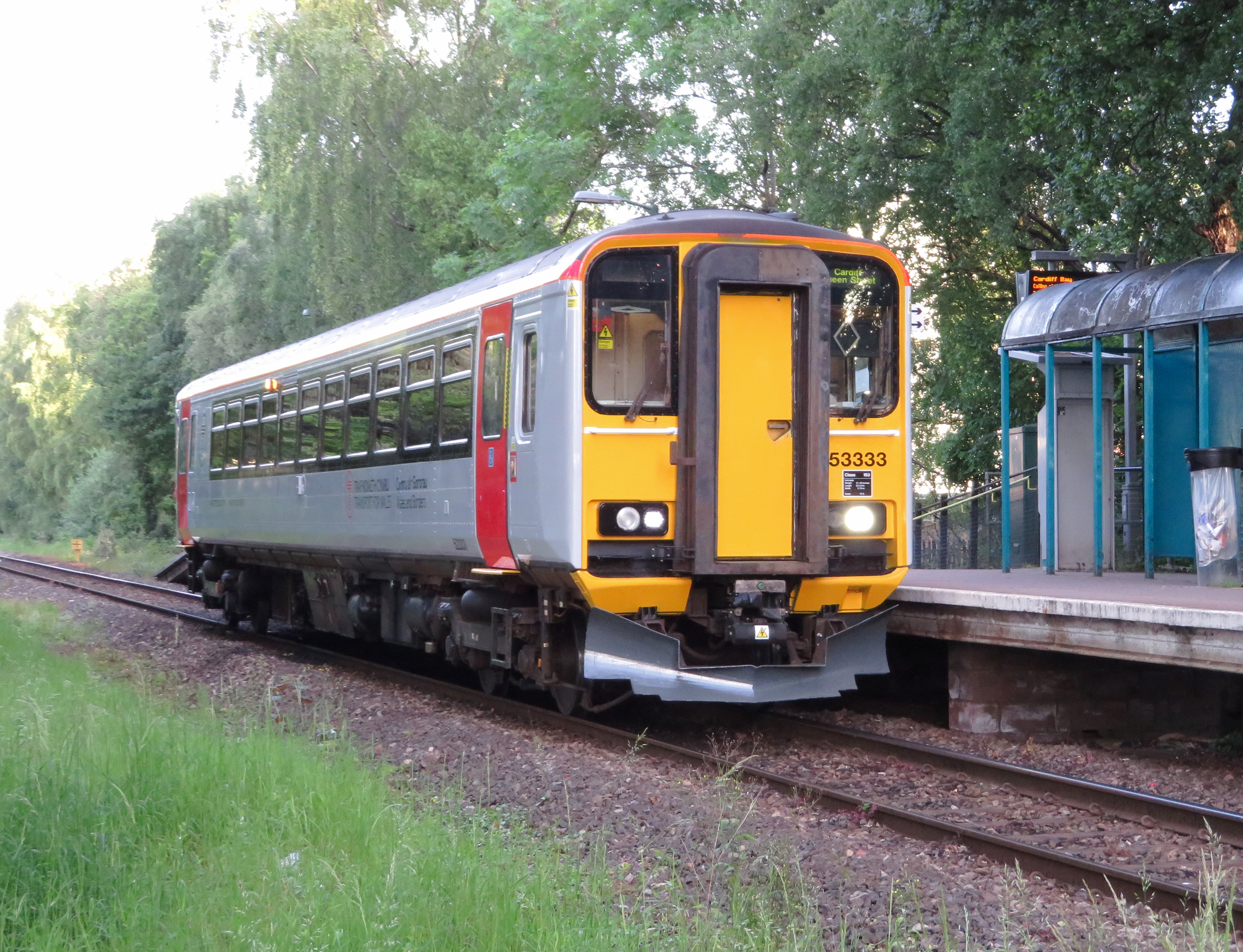
- A KeolisAmey Wales Class 153 at Ty Glas (2019)

- Interior of a refurbished Transport for Wales unit
- In service: 1991–present
- Manufacturers: Hunslet-Barclay, Kilmarnock; (converted from Class 155 units built by Leyland Bus)
- Order no.: 31026
- Family name: Sprinter
- Replaced: BR First-Generation DMUs
- Constructed: 1987–1988; (Converted 1991–1992)
- Entered service: 1991
- Number built: 70
- Number in service: 37
- Number preserved: 2
- Number scrapped: 12
- Formation: Single vehicle: DMSL
- Diagram: DX203; (From DP248 and DP249)
- Fleet numbers: Units: 153301–153335; 153351–153385; Vehicles: 52301–52335; 57351–57385
- Capacity: Pre-PRM: 66, 72, or 75 seats; PRM modified: 59 seats
- Operators: Current; Network Rail; ScotRail; Transport for Wales Rail; Former; Abellio ScotRail; Anglia Railways; Arriva Rail North; Arriva Trains Northern; Arriva Trains Wales; Central Trains; East Midlands Railway; East Midlands Trains; First North Western; Great Western Railway; Greater Anglia; London Midland; National Express East Anglia; Northern Rail; Northern Trains; Regional Railways; Transport for Wales; Wales & West; Wessex Trains; West Midlands Trains
- Depots: Current: Canton (Cardiff); Corkerhill (Glasgow); Former: Newton Heath (Manchester)

Specifications
- Car body construction: Steel
- Car length: 23.208 m (76 ft 1.7 in)
- Width: 2.700 m (8 ft 10.3 in)
- Height: 3.746 m (12 ft 3.5 in)
- Doors: Single-leaf sliding plug (2 per side)
- Wheelbase: Bogies: 2.6 m (8 ft 6 in); Bogie centres: 16.0 m (52 ft 6 in)
- Maximum speed: 75 mph (120 km/h)
- Weight: 41.2 tonnes (40.5 long tons; 45.4 short tons)
- Axle load: Route Availability 1
- Prime mover: 1 × Cummins NT855-R5
- Engine type: Inline-6 4-stroke turbo-diesel
- Displacement: 14 L (855 cu in)
- Power output: 213 kW (285 hp)
- Transmission: Voith T 211 r (hydrokinetic)
- HVAC: Warm air & hot-water radiators
- UIC classification: 2′B′
- Bogies: Powered: BREL P3-10; Unpowered: BREL BT38
- Minimum turning radius: 90 m (295 ft 3 in)
- Braking system: Electro-pneumatic (tread)
- Safety systems: AWS; TPWS
- Coupling system: BSI
- Multiple working: Within class, plus Classes 14x, 15x, and 170
- Track gauge: 1,435 mm (4 ft 8 1/2 in) standard gauge

Notes/references
- Converted from 35 × Class 155 units

The British Rail Class 153 Super Sprinter are a type of diesel-hydraulic railcars, which were converted from two-coach Class 155 diesel multiple units in the early 1990s. The class was intended for service on rural branch lines, either where passenger numbers do not justify longer trains or to boost the capacity on services with high passenger volume.

== Description ==
In 1987 and 1988, Regional Railways took delivery of 35 two-coach Class 155 units, built by Leyland Bus at its Workington factory, to replace older DMUs. After the Class 155s entered service, a further requirement emerged for the replacement of ageing railcars on rural lines, mostly of Class 121 and Class 122. British Rail decided to meet this need by dividing each unit in the Regional Railways Class 155 fleet into two separate railcars that could then be converted for use independently, which would create a fleet of 70 vehicles. The seven further Class 155 units that had been delivered to the West Yorkshire Passenger Transport Executive (WYPTE) in 1989 were not included in this plan.

In 1990, British Rail awarded a contract for the work to Hunslet-Barclay and it was undertaken at the firm's Kilmarnock plant in 1991 and 1992. The Class 155 units had been numbered from 155301 to 155335 and consisted of DMSL(A) vehicles 52301 to 52335 and DMSL(B) vehicles 57301 to 57335. After separation, the DMSL(A) vehicles were given new unit numbers from 153301 to 153335, while the DMSL(B) vehicles were renumbered 57351 to 57385 (incrementing each by 50) and given matching 'unit' numbers from 153351 to 153385.

The conversion involved retrofitting a driver's cab into the spaces previously used for luggage racks at the "inside" end (B-end) of each vehicle, where each vehicle had previously been coupled back-to-back with its matching opposite in a Class 155 formation. This new cab is notably smaller than the original one at the A-end, as the positions of the exterior doors were not changed during the conversion, and it was necessary to reduce the size of the vestibule slightly in order to provide enough space for the driver. The difference in cab sizes is visible from the outside of the vehicle, which appears unsymmetrical when viewed from the sides. The arrangement of headlights on the new cab end is also different to that on the original cab end.

They are fitted with BSI automatic couplers and are able to work in tandem with other multiple units with BSI couplers and compatible coupler electrical wiring; these are Classes 142, 143, 144, 150, 155, 156, 158, 159, 170 and 172. Gangway connections are provided at either end to allow passengers and staff to walk between units working in multiple, in-class as well as Classes 150/2, 155, 156, 158 and 159. The maximum speed of 75 mph (121 km/h) was unchanged.

== Operations ==
=== Current operations ===
==== Wales & Borders ====
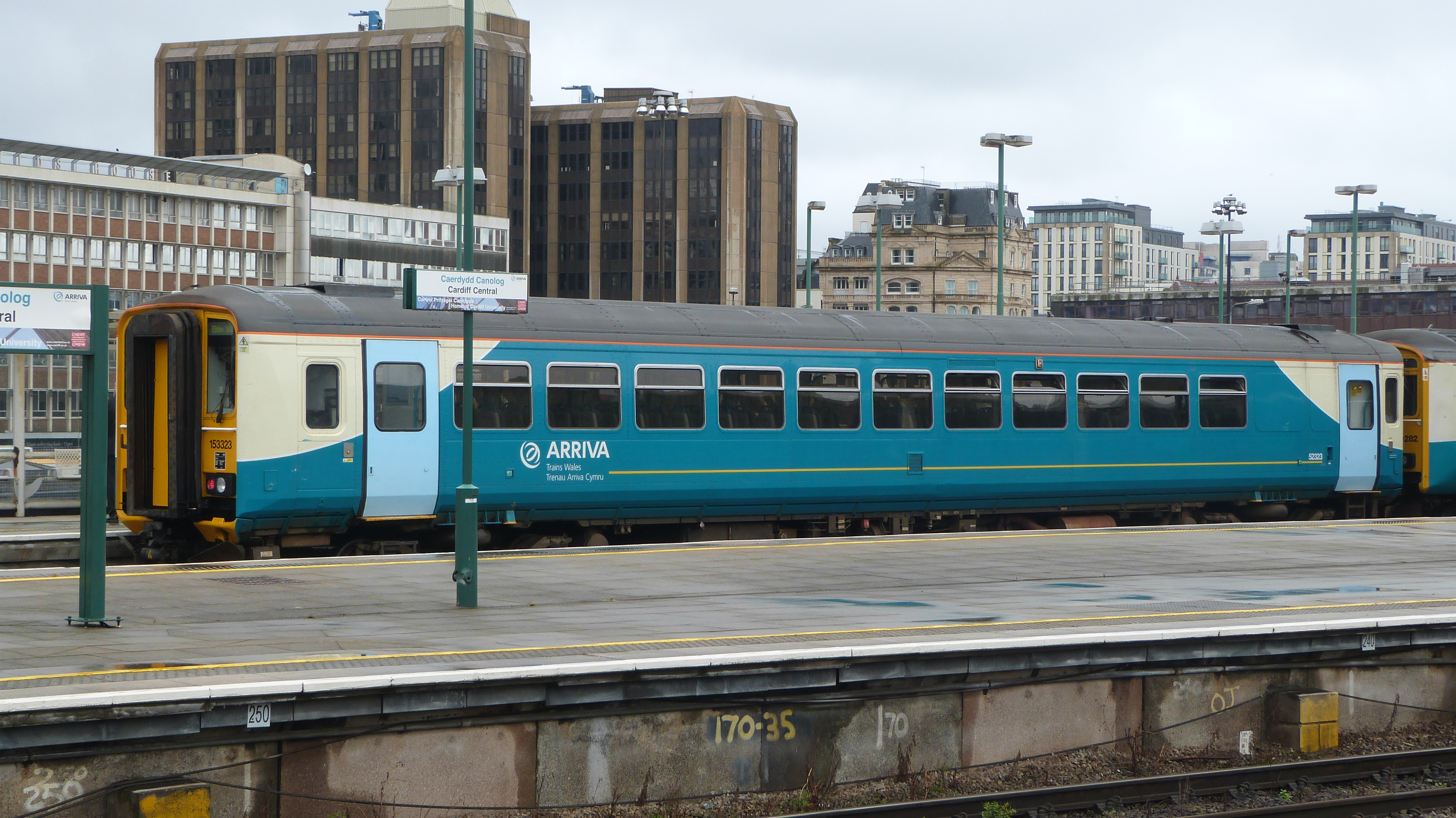
An Arriva Trains Wales Class 153 at Cardiff Central (2014)

Transport for Wales Rail has a fleet of 22 Class 153s in active service. They are normally used on rural branch lines, such as the Heart of Wales Line from Shrewsbury to Swansea, and on local stopping services from Crewe to Shrewsbury via Nantwich; they are also used on some main line services.

Following a timetable change in December 2006, Arriva Trains Wales had lost three of its then-11 Class 153 units, leaving it with eight. Two were transferred to East Midlands Trains, with the other going to First Great Western. In October 2018, all eight passed with the franchise to Transport for Wales (KeolisAmey Wales), which acquired a further five from Great Western Railway in April 2019, five from Abellio Greater Anglia in December 2019, four from East Midlands Railway in January 2020 and another two from EMR in November 2020, which brought the total number up to 24 until a further two units were acquired.

As at February 2020, Transport for Wales was the only train operating company to have modified Class 153s to comply with the requirements of the Persons with Reduced Mobility Technical Specification for Interoperability (PRM-TSI), (Note: In addition to accommodations for persons with reduced mobility, the PRM-TSI also mandates provisions for people with sensory impairments. It supplants the existing Rail Vehicle Accessibility Regulations.) which came into effect on 1 January 2020. In June 2021, the new state-owned Transport for Wales Rail purchased eight outright for continued use on the Heart of Wales line, after plans to replace them with Class 170 units were cancelled. In July 2022, the refurbishment of the 26 units was completed.

On 19 February 2025, the first of the Active Travel Class 153/5s entered service with Transport For Wales Rail; the last entered service on 25 September 2025.

==== Scotland ====
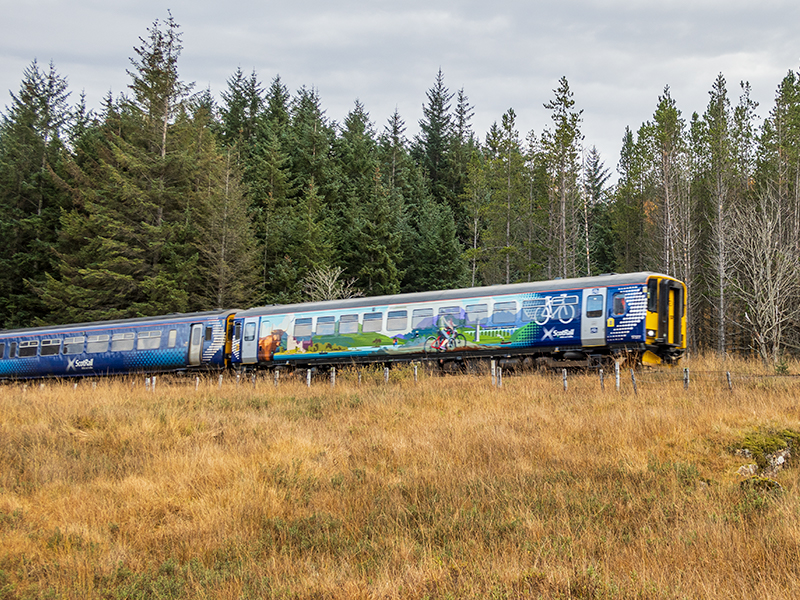
A ScotRail Highland Explorer on the West Highland Line

In 2019 and 2020, five former GWR 153s moved from Northern to Abellio ScotRail for use on West Highland Line services between Glasgow Queen Street and Oban, in conjunction with ScotRail's existing Class 156 fleet. The first refurbished carriage was unveiled in late 2020. The first unit began service on 19 July 2021.

The trains were also refurbished inside providing free wi-fi, plug and USB sockets, with maps of the West Highland Line on the tables. ScotRail described the service offering as Highland Explorer Due to a local agreement with train drivers' union ASLEF, ScotRail's Class 153s can only be driven from the A-end cab – the B-end cab being considered too cramped for long-distance driving.

==== Network Rail ====
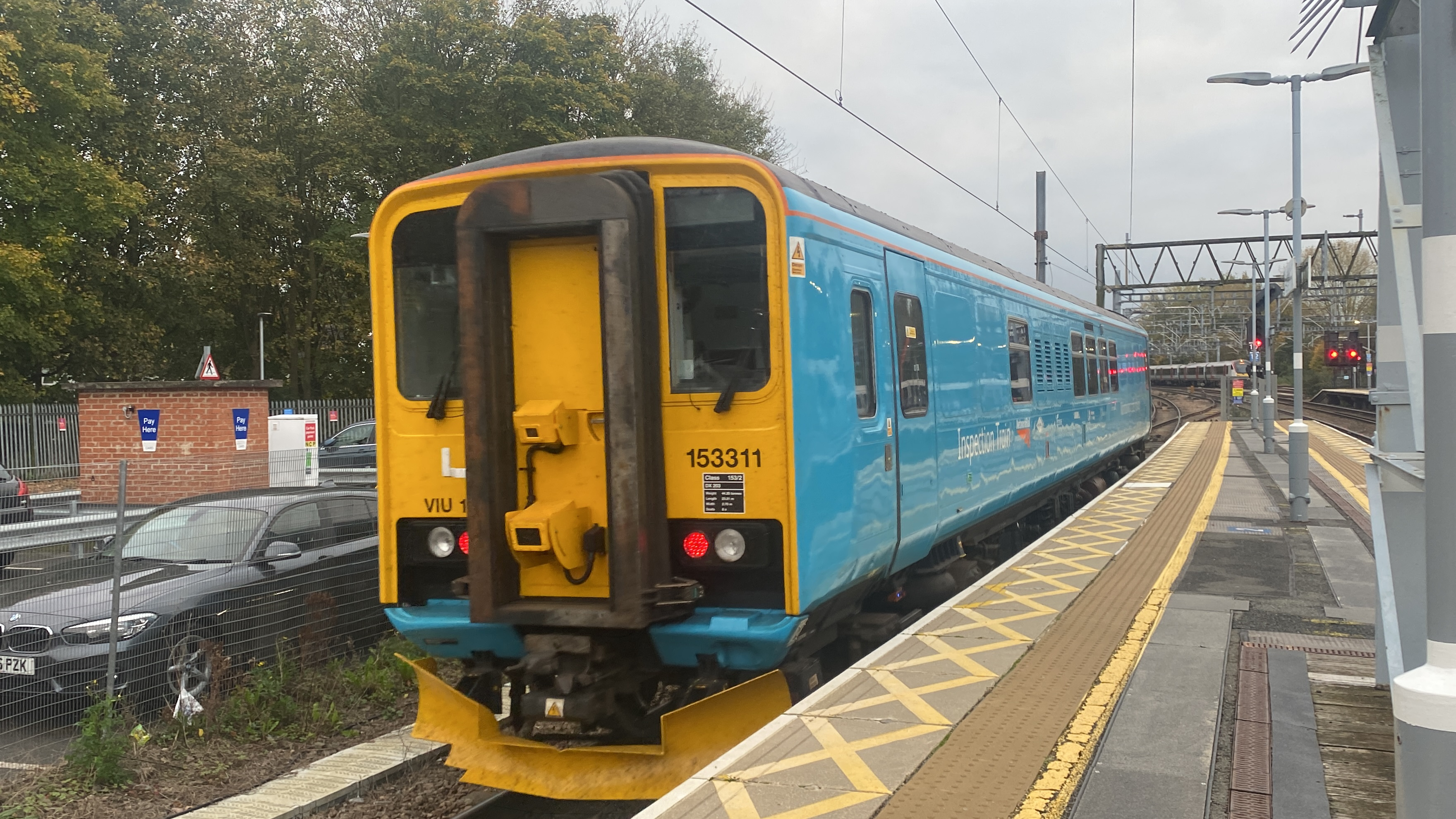
A Network Rail Class 153 at Shenfield (2024)

In May 2021, Network Rail purchased three units (153311, 153376 and 153385) for use on infrastructure monitoring services.

=== Former operations ===
==== Regional Railways ====
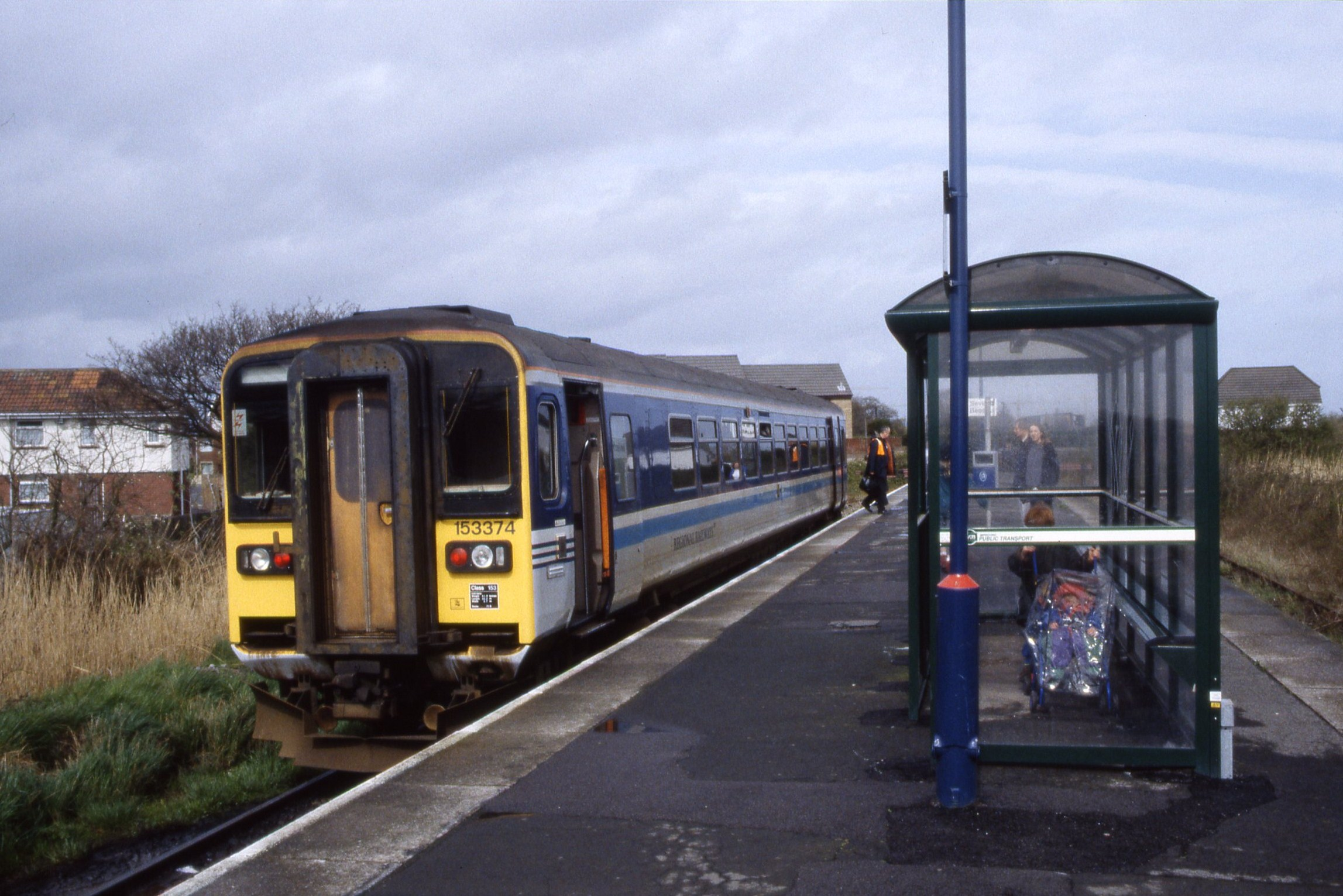
A Regional Railways Class 153 at Severn Beach (1994)

Regional Railways operated Class 153s on many branch lines throughout the Midlands, Wales and Northern England, both individually and with other classes of Sprinter unit. They were initially allocated to Heaton (15), Cardiff Canton (9), Plymouth Laira (10), Norwich Crown Point (16) and Tyseley (20). Class 153s were often found working services from;

- Newcastle to Carlisle
- Peterborough to Lincoln
- Nottingham to Birmingham New Street, via Leicester
- Crewe to Derby
- Ipswich to Lowestoft and Felixstowe
- Norwich to Great Yarmouth and Sheringham.

==== Post-privatisation ====
In the lead up to privatisation of British Rail, ownership of the fleet passed to Angel Trains (30) and Porterbrook (40) in April 1994. Upon privatisation, they were initially operated by Anglia Railways, Central Trains, First North Western, Northern Spirit and Wales & West.

==== South West England ====
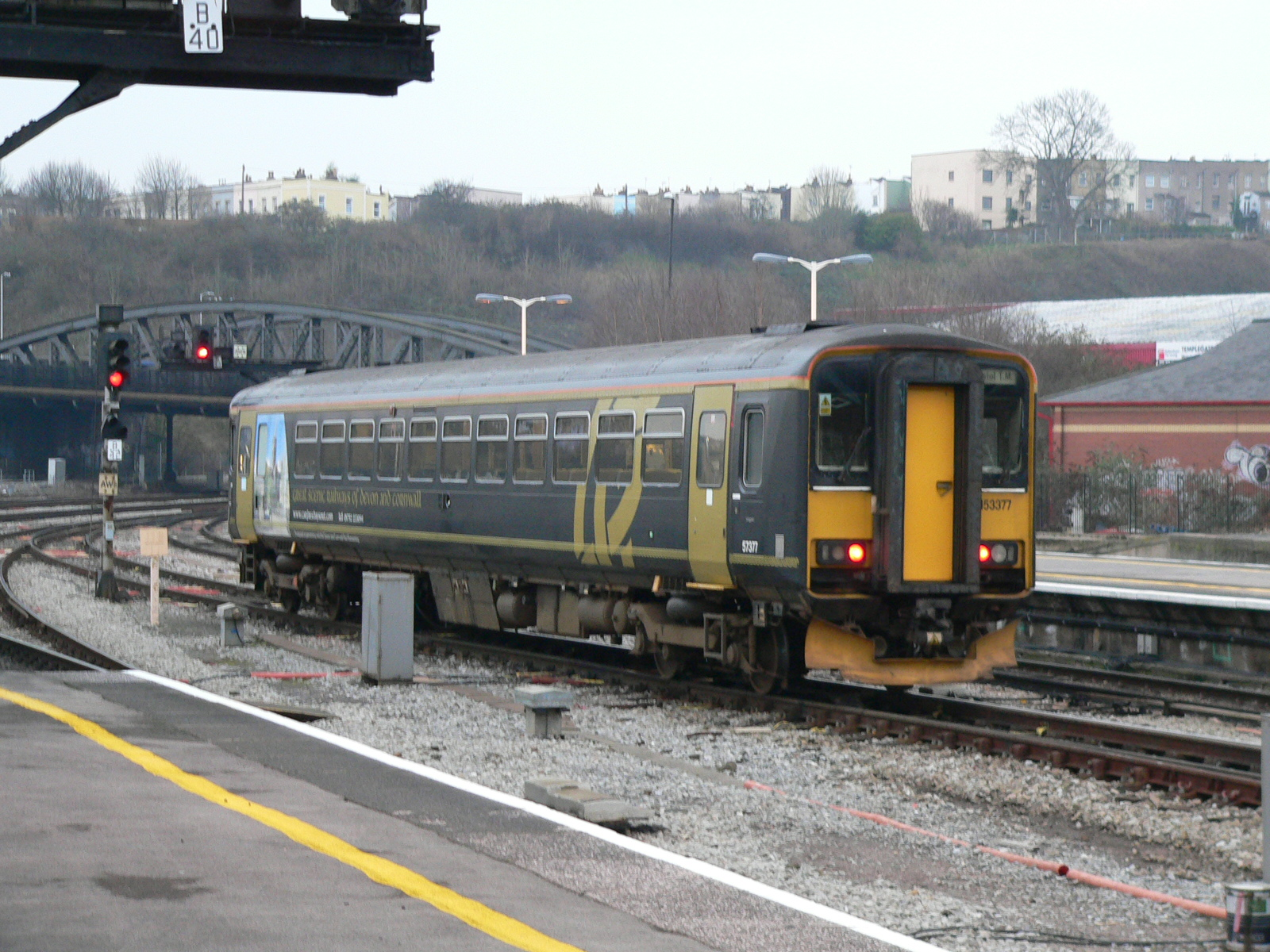
A Wessex Trains Class 153 at Bristol Temple Meads (2006)

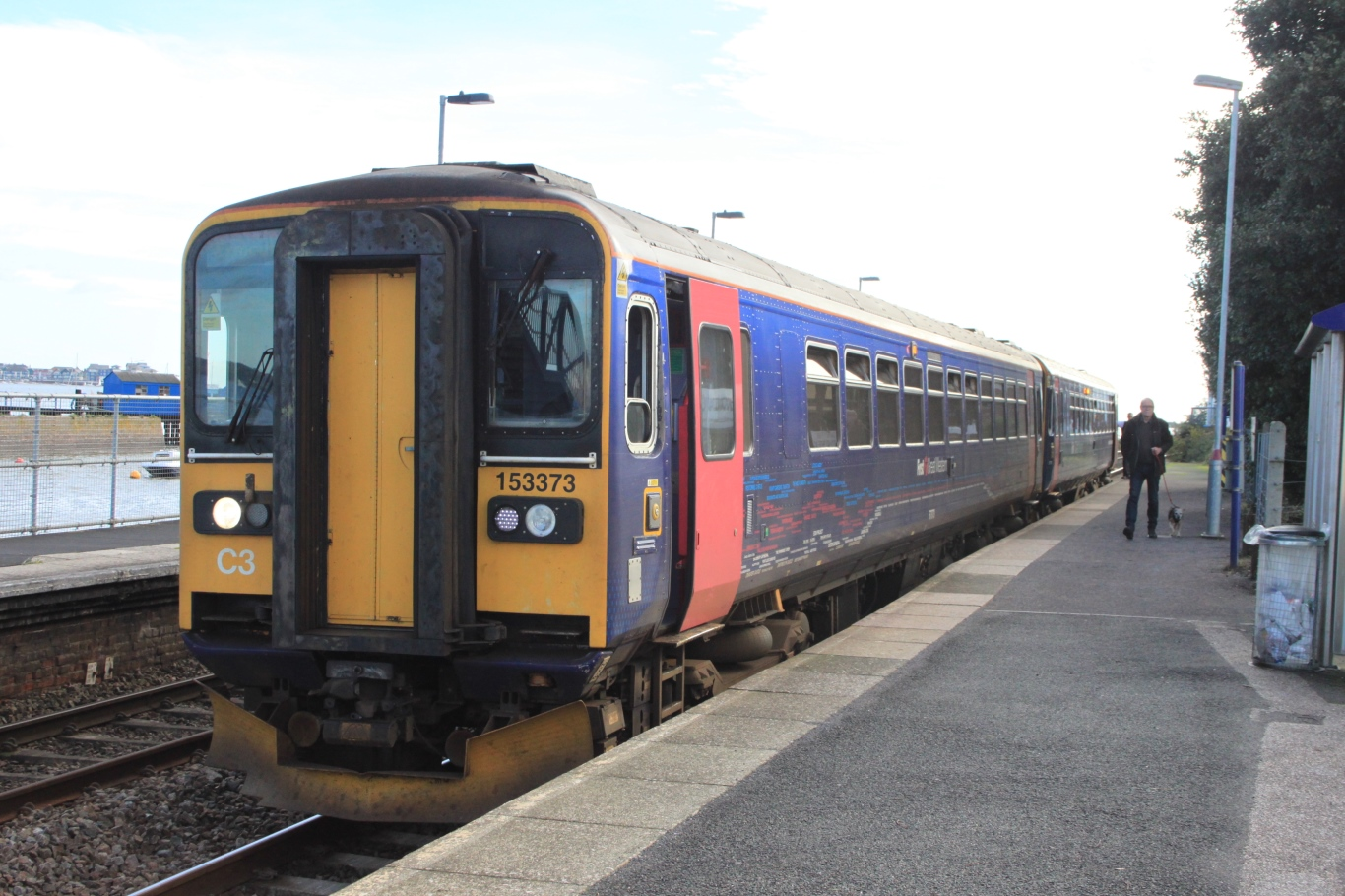
A First Great Western Class 153 at Starcross (2013)

First Great Western took over the Wessex Trains fleet upon the merger of the two franchises. Wessex Trains had, in turn, inherited its fleet of 13 units from its predecessor Wales & West.

Units were used on local services in Cornwall, Devon and around Bristol. They were also used on Bristol Temple Meads to Weymouth, Southampton Central and Worcester Foregate Street services, and the Swindon via Melksham to Southampton Central service.

In mid-2004, Wessex Trains received a further two units from Central Trains to allow it to lengthen some services.

Following the introduction of a new timetable in December 2006, four units were taken off lease and stored at Eastleigh Works. After a period in storage, these four units were pressed into service with East Midlands Trains.

In December 2007, First Great Western received an additional Class 153 from Arriva Trains Wales, bringing its total to 12. This unit arrived in the blue with gold star livery of former operator First North Western.

For summer 2011, two London Midland Class 153s were allocated to the South West for strengthening purposes, based at Exeter TMD for the duration. This allocation was eventually made permanent, as a result of London Midland keeping three Class 150 units after the new Class 172s entered service. This brought First Great Western's number of Class 153 units up to 14.

Nine of those 14 units later left the fleet, with the remaining five moving to Transport for Wales in April 2019, after being displaced by internal cascading.

==== East Anglia ====
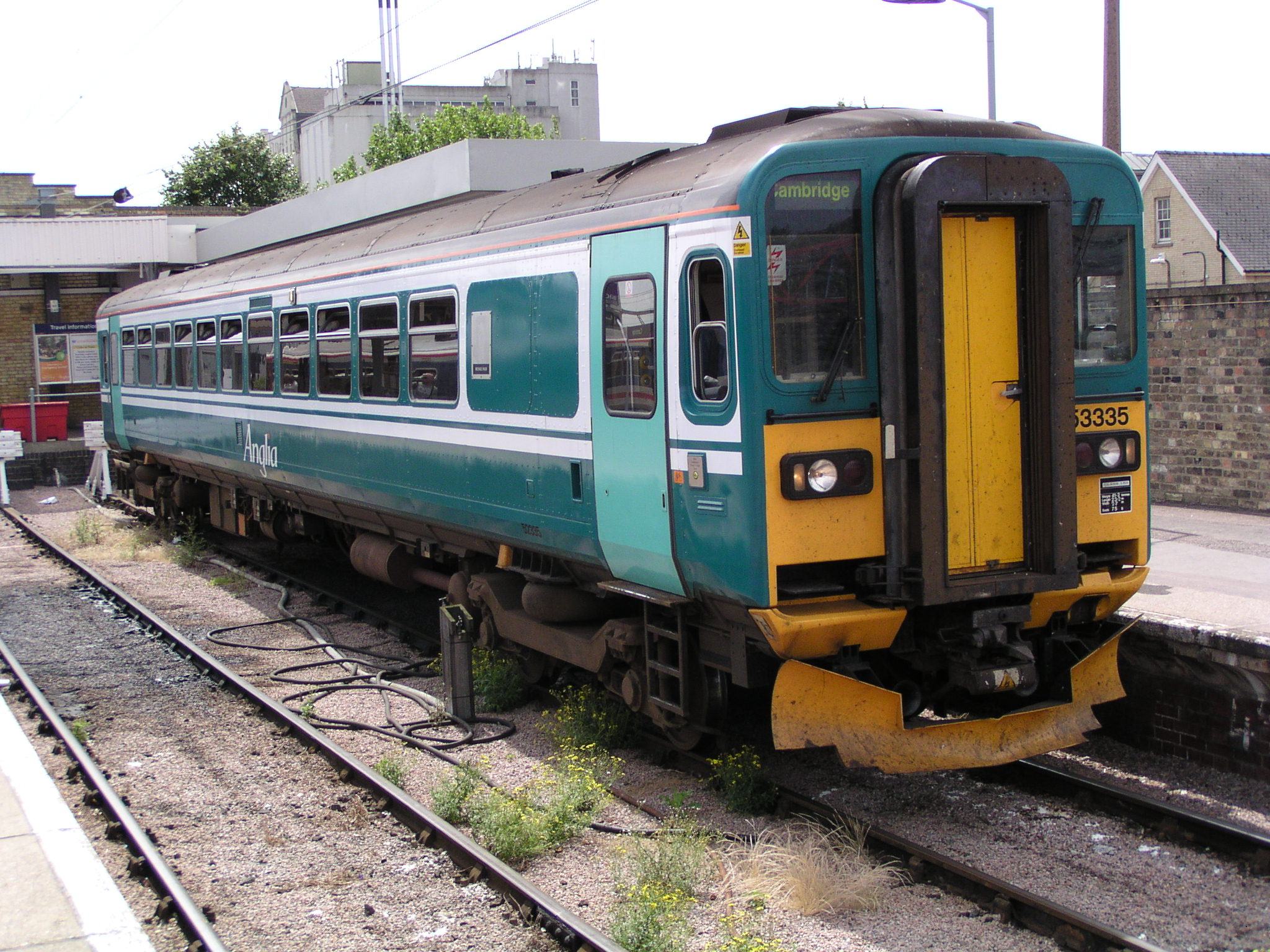
An Anglia Railways Class 153 at Cambridge (2003)

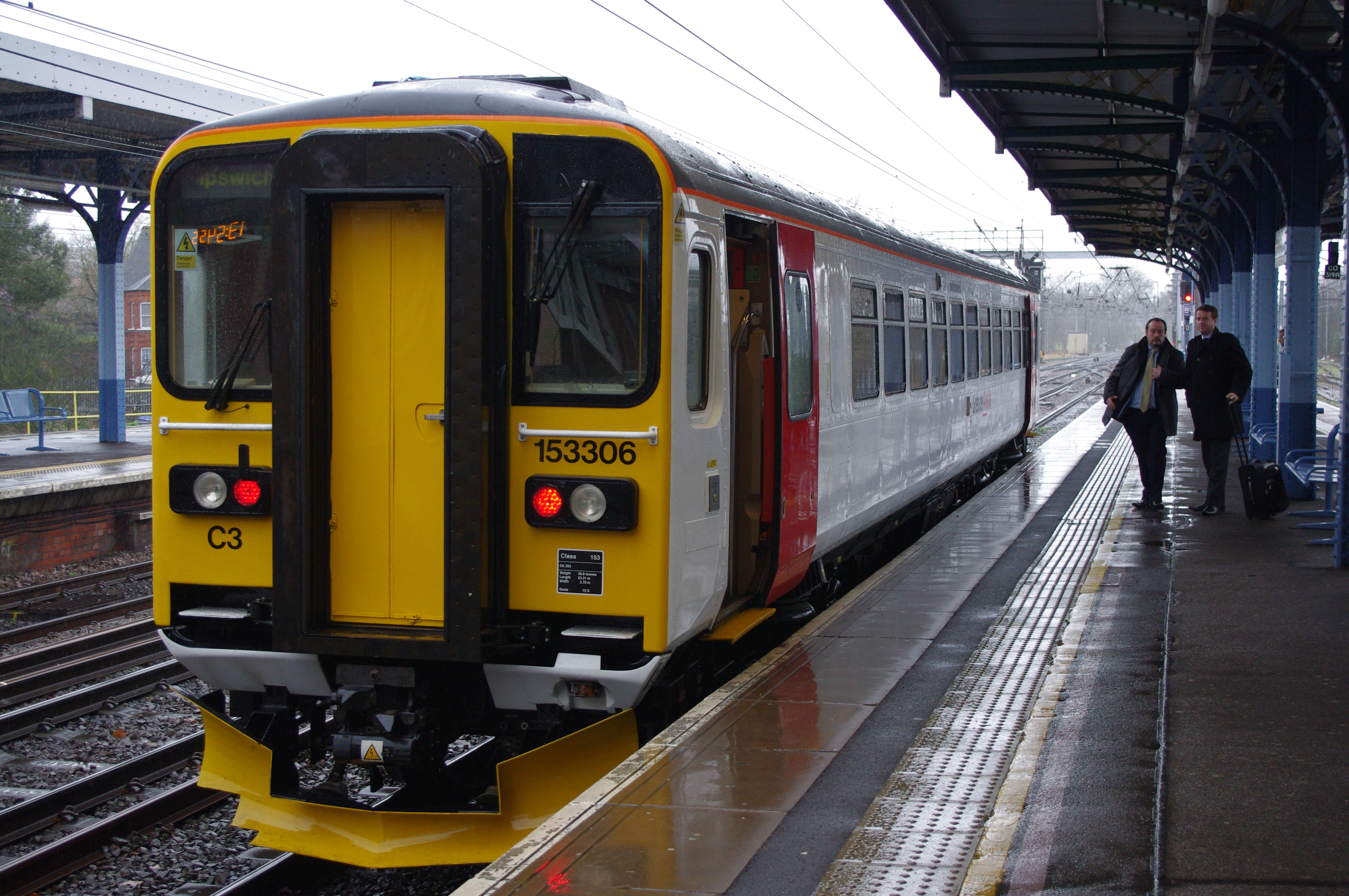
A Class 153 at Ipswich

Anglia Railways inherited a small fleet of seven units, for local services in Suffolk and Norfolk. Services operated by these units included Ipswich to Cambridge, Peterborough, Felixstowe and Lowestoft, and Norwich to Lowestoft, Great Yarmouth and Sheringham; one set was also hired to First Great Eastern for use on the Gainsborough line.

In 2004, Anglia Railways became part of the Greater Anglia franchise operated by One, which was subsequently renamed National Express East Anglia. Two units left the franchise to East Midlands Trains. During 2012, Porterbrook began refurbishing the body and interiors and repainting them in base white with red doors and Greater Anglia logos.

In 2014, a rolling refurbishment of Abellio Greater Anglia's Class 153s commenced, which included new interior panels, tables, carpets and lighting. All were replaced by Class 755s in late 2019. These then moved to Transport for Wales in December 2019, to cover for delays with its new rolling stock.

==== West Midlands ====
West Midlands Trains used eight Class 153 DMUs on commuter lines, including the Leamington Spa to Nuneaton line, and the Marston Vale line between Bedford and Bletchley. After the deployment of Class 172s from London Overground and Class 230s on those two lines, they were used with Class 170s and 172s on Birmingham-Hereford and Snow Hill Lines.

All eight were inherited from Central Trains in their livery. All were repainted into London Midland city lines livery upon refurbishment at Eastleigh Works. The Class 153s that were used on the Stourbridge Town branch line have been replaced by new built lightweight Class 139 railcars. This was due to take place in December 2008, but the delivery of the new units was delayed; after several months of bustitution, London Midland reintroduced diesel services from 15 March, pending the completion of Class 139 testing. The Class 139 received passenger certification from Network Rail in March 2009 and the service finally began three months later. In December 2020, the final Class 153s were withdrawn from service and put into long-term storage. Before withdrawal, they mostly operated on the Birmingham-Hereford line.

==== East Midlands ====
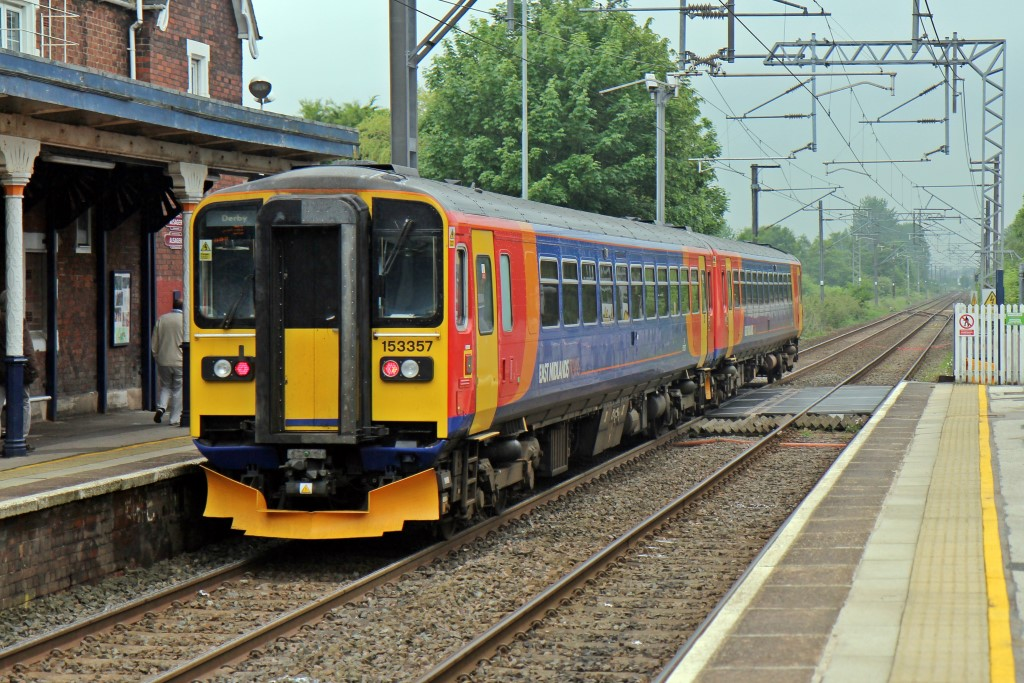
An East Midlands Trains Class 153 at Alsager (2015)

East Midlands Trains inherited many examples of Class 153 units, receiving six from Central Trains, three from National Express East Anglia and four former First Great Western units that had been stored at Eastleigh Works. In December 2007, East Midlands Trains received two from Arriva Trains Wales and two from Northern Rail. In July 2010, the units were refurbished at Neville Hill TMD, with corrosion repair, an internal refresh and a cab refurbishment programme was undertaken.

All of the units passed with the East Midlands franchise to East Midlands Railway in August 2019. In January 2020, four were transferred to Transport for Wales. At one point in April 2020, only three EMR Class 153s were in service, following the implementation of an emergency timetable due to the COVID-19 pandemic, with all others being stored out of use as surplus to requirement. Two more returned to service by July 2020, while five others (153302, 153318, 153368, 153372, 153374 and 153382) had their leases terminated. The last of the East Midlands Railway Class 153s were withdrawn in December 2021, as they were not compliant with the Persons with Reduced Mobility Technical Specification for Interoperability (PRM-TSI) regulations. Class 156 units replaced them on the Barton-on-Humber route from 13 December.

East Midlands Railway's fleet of Class 153s were used on rural routes:

- Nottingham to Worksop (one diagram used two units)
- Nottingham to Matlock via Derby
- Nottingham to Skegness
- Leicester to Lincoln
- Peterborough to Lincoln and Doncaster
- Newark Northgate to Grimsby Town (to Cleethorpes after 1900 and during summer)
- Derby to Crewe, via Stoke-on-Trent
- Cleethorpes to Barton-on-Humber.

==== Northern England ====
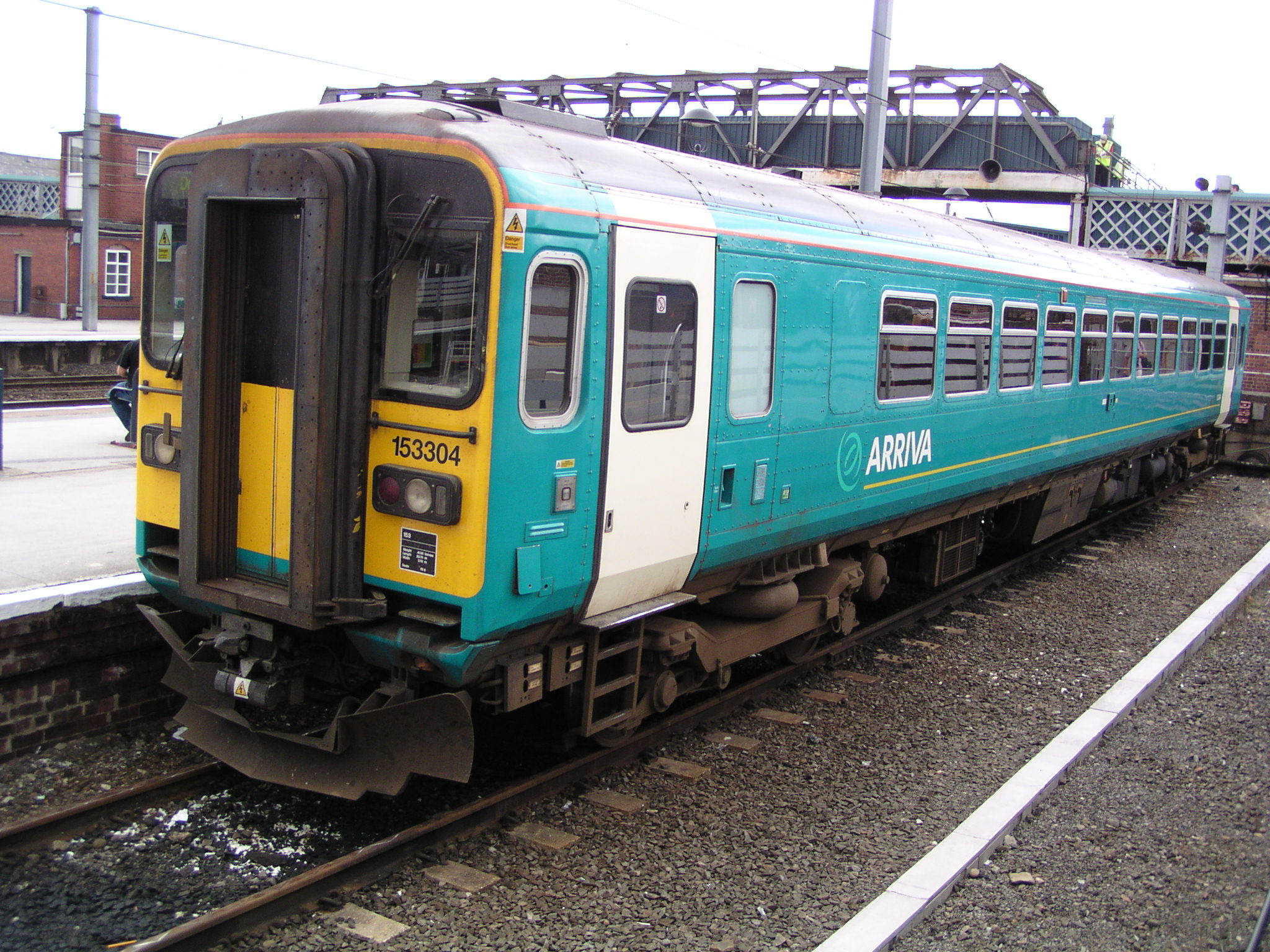
An Arriva Trains Northern Class 153 at Doncaster (2003)

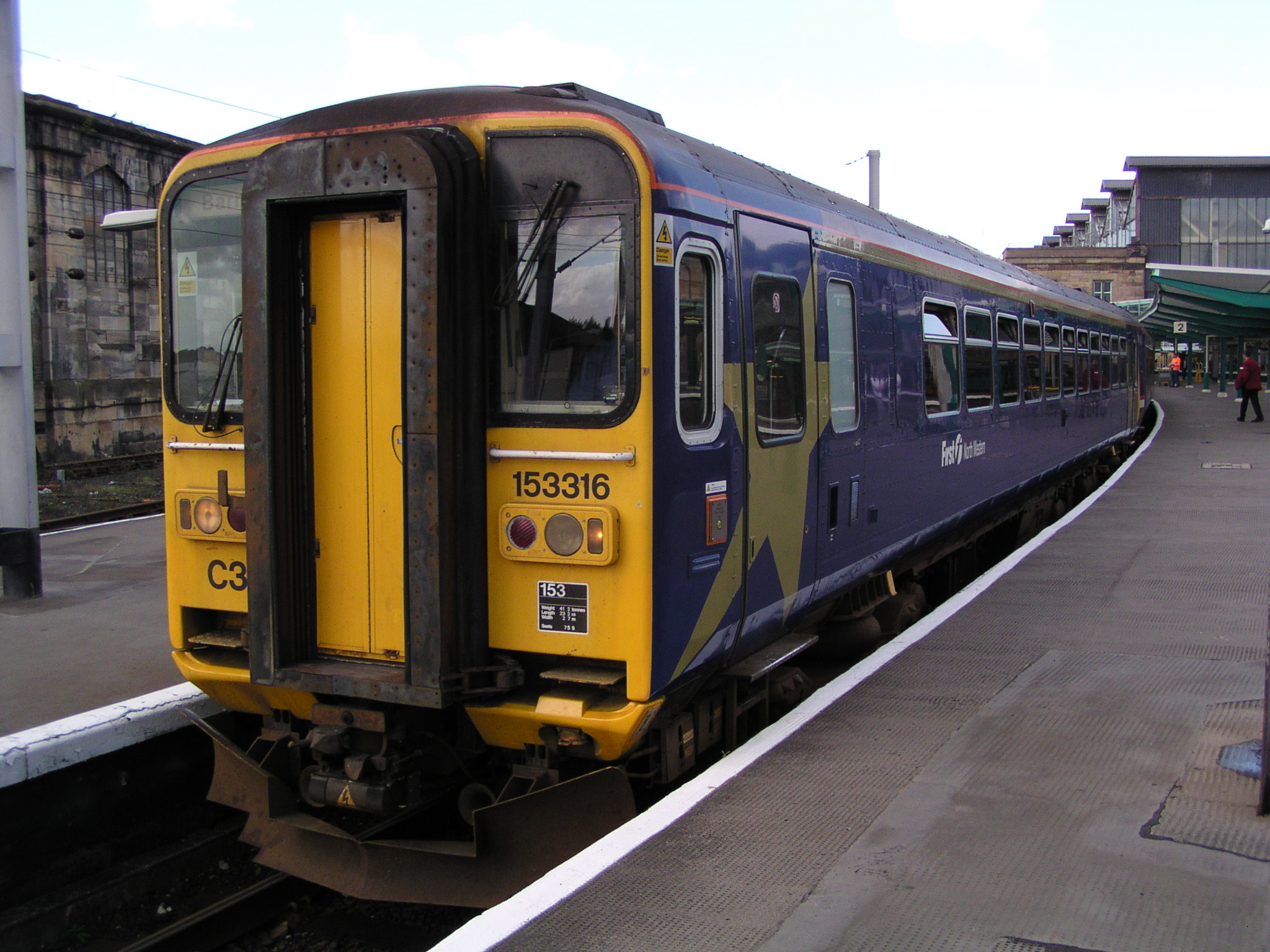
A First North Western Class 153 at Carlisle (2004)

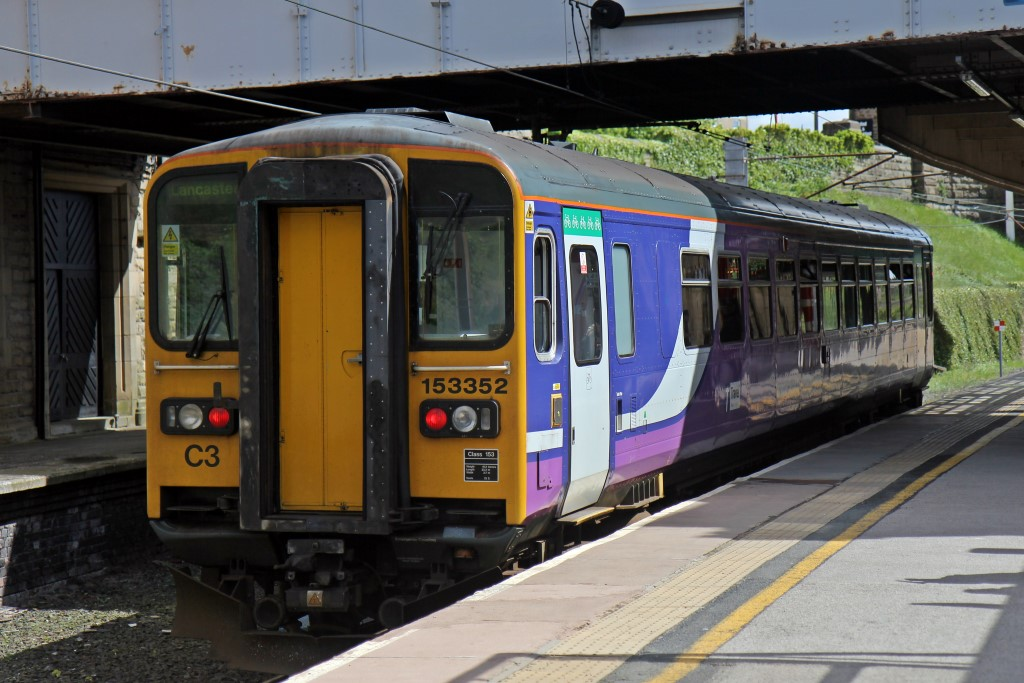
A Northern Rail Class 153 at Lancaster (2015)

The Northern Rail franchise commenced operations in December 2004. It inherited the fleets previously operated by Arriva Trains Northern (ATN) and First North Western (FNW), whose routes the new franchise incorporated. Northern Rail's successor, Arriva Rail North, at one point operated the largest fleet of Class 153 units.

Northern Rail inherited a fleet of eight units from FNW, which were used on local services around Manchester and Chester, Lancaster and Barrow-in-Furness to Carlisle, and Preston to Ormskirk services. The fleet was repainted in the now obsolete North Western Trains blue and gold livery. Prior to becoming part of Northern Rail, four former FNW units were transferred to the Arriva Trains Wales franchise, since the lines operated by FNW in Wales were transferred to this new company.

A larger fleet of 12 units was inherited from ATN. They are used on various local services around Leeds, Doncaster and Sheffield. One regular job is the Cleethorpes to Barton-on-Humber services, which see a unit stabled at Cleethorpes overnight and Sunday. Other routes are the Lincoln to Scunthorpe, via Retford and Sheffield, and the Saturday-only Sheffield to Cleethorpes, via Retford.

In December 2007, two units were taken off lease from Northern Rail and transferred to East Midlands Trains.

In the first half of 2018, five units were transferred from Great Western Railway on a temporary basis to boost capacity until the new Class 195 units entered service; three of these then moved to Abellio ScotRail in 2019, with the remainder following in 2020. On 1 March 2020, ARN's Class 153 units transferred to new operator Northern Trains.

All Northern Trains Class 153s were sent to storage at Ely Potter Papworth Terminal by December 2021.

== Preservation and further use ==
The stripped bodyshell of unit 153374 was donated to the Llanelli and Mynydd Mawr Railway, for static use as a community cafe at Cynheidre.

In December 2023, the preserved Great Central Railway acquired two Class 153 units: 153308 and 153371. These units were not intended for preservation per se, but to generate revenue through use for technology testing contracts and to train main line railway staff from East Midlands Railway and CrossCountry. In March 2024, 153371 was the first sprinter train to operate a passenger service in preservation.

In 2024, Daniel Ashville Louisy of Ashville Aggregates Ltd, purchased unit 153334 for use as a reception building in Thorney Mill Sidings.

In 2024, Go-op Co-operative Ltd. received approval from the Office of Rail and Road to run services between Swindon, Taunton and Weston-super-Mare under an open-access agreement, using refurbished Class 153 units.

== Fleet details ==
Class	Operator	Qty.	Unit numbers
153	ScotRail	5	153305, 153370, 153373, 153377, 153380
153	Network Rail	4	153311, 153376, 153379, 153385
153	Transport for Wales Rail	22	153303, 153312, 153318, 153320, 153323, 153327, 153329, 153333, 153353, 153361, 153367, 153369, 153382, 153906, 153909-153910, 153913-153914, 153922, 153925-153926, 153935
153	Transport for Wales Rail	6	153507, 153528, 153531, 153552, 153568, 153572
153	Stored	16	153301, 153304, 153315, 153319, 153351, 153355–153357, 153362, 153375, 153378, 153381, 153383, 153384, 153908, 153921,
153	Scrapped	12	153302, 153316, 153324, 153330, 153332, 153358-153360, 153363-153366
153	Non-railway use	2	153334, 153374
153	Preserved	2	153308, 153371
153	Non-passenger use	2	153317, 153354

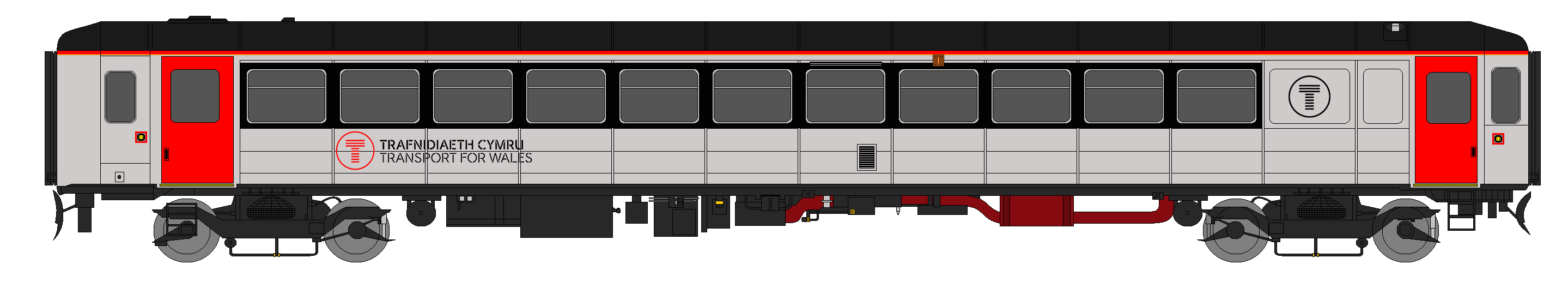
Side-profile illustration of a Transport for Wales Class 153 vehicle, with A-end cab facing left

== Named units ==
Some units have received names:

- 153306 Edith Cavell
- 153309 Gerard Fiennes (denamed)
- 153311 John Constable
- 153314 Delia Smith
- 153316 John "Longitude" Harrison inventor of the Marine Chronometer (scrapped)
- 153322 Benjamin Britten (denamed)
- 153326 Ted Ellis
- 153329 The St. Ives Belle (denamed)
- 153335 Michael Palin (denamed)
- 153362 Dylan Thomas 1914-1953 (denamed)
- 153369 The Looe Valley Explorer (denamed)
- 153376 X24 Expeditious (denamed)
- 153383 Ecclesbourne Valley Railway 150 Years

== Models ==
When the units were first introduced, Hurst models produced a detailing kit to convert a Dapol model of a Class 155 into a 153.

The Class 153 has been produced in OO gauge by Hornby in Central Trains, First North Western, Abellio Greater Anglia, Northern Rail, Regional Railways, East Midlands Trains, London Midland City, Arriva Trains Wales, and Great Scenic Railways of Devon and Cornwall (Wessex Trains) liveries. These models have been praised for their detail.

Dapol announced an N gauge model of the Class 153 in October 2008. The model debuted at the Warley National Model Railway Exhibition in November 2009. In 2010, Dapol issued their model in St Ives Bay Line advertising livery.

Several Class 153s have also been produced for rail simulators. Making Tracks have a digital model available for the PC railway simulator Microsoft Train Simulator, whilst Just Trains has released the model for Railworks.
