= Valley Lines (train operating company) =

Welsh train operating company, 1996-2001

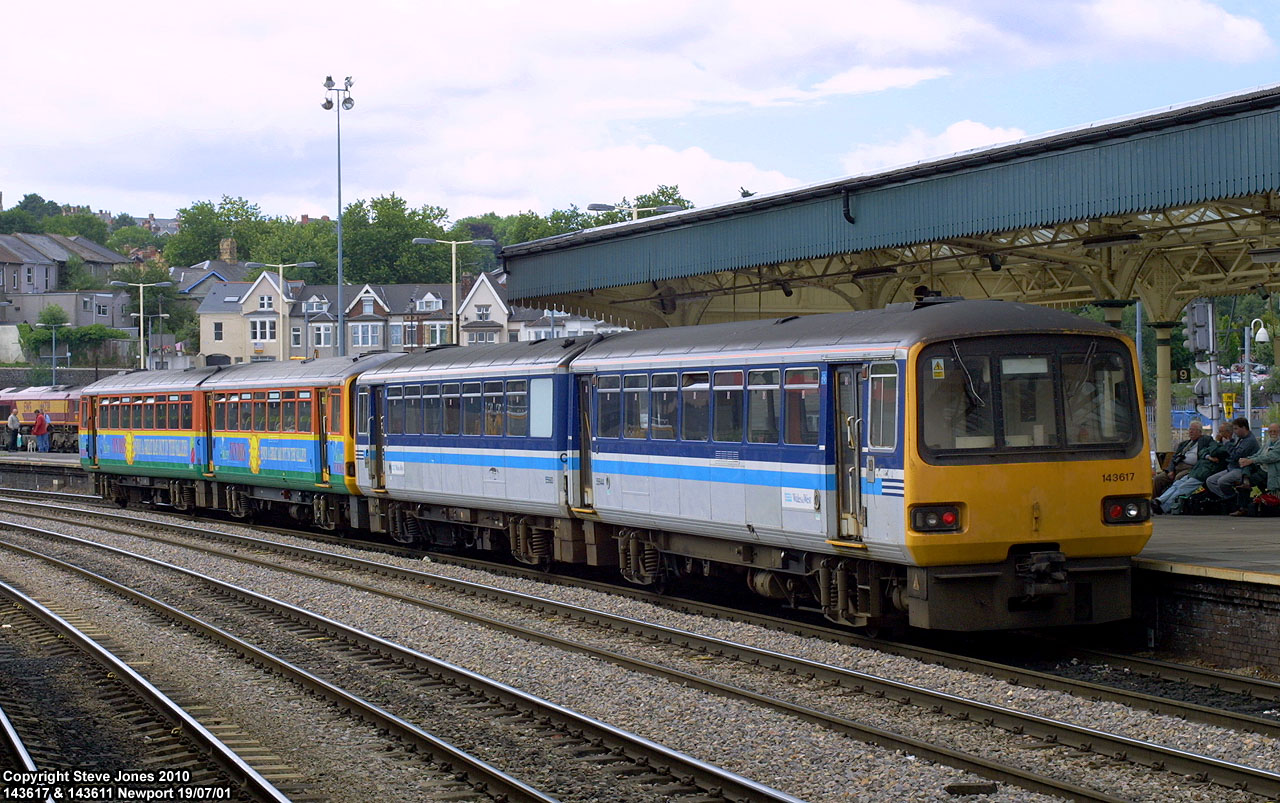
- Class 143 Pacer units at Newport

Overview
- Franchises: Valley Lines; 13 October 1996 – 13 October 2001
- Main regions: Cardiff and South Wales Valleys
- Other regions: Bridgend and Vale of Glamorgan
- Fleet: 36
- Parent company: National Express Group
- Reporting mark: VL
- Successor: Wales and Borders

Valley Lines was the trading name of the Cardiff Railway Company, which was a Welsh train operating company owned by Prism Rail and later National Express, that ran local services around Cardiff from October 1996 until October 2001.

== Services ==
Valley Lines operated passenger services around Cardiff and the Valleys in South Wales.

Routes operated consisted of four northern branches to Aberdare, Merthyr Tydfil, Rhymney and Treherbert, which were interworked with the shorter southerly branches to Penarth, Barry Island and Cardiff Bay. The City Line between Radyr and Coryton also formed part of the franchise, with all services calling at Cardiff Queen Street.

The operator originally undertook to introduce new services from Pontypridd to Manchester and Portsmouth, but this did not take place.

The franchise predates the introduction of services that are now generally included under the 'Valley Lines' umbrella, such as those via the Vale of Glamorgan line and to Ebbw Vale.

== Rolling stock ==
Valley Lines inherited a fleet of Class 143s and Class 150s from British Rail. Starting in 1998, the operator changed its fleet by exchanging some of its Class 150s for Class 142s from the north of England.

Valley Lines also used Mark 2 carriages on Rhymney Line services with EWS Class 37s and Fifty Fund Class 50s among the locomotives used.

=== Fleet ===
Class	Image	Type	Top speed		Number	Built
Class	Image	Type	mph	km/h	Number	Built
142 Pacer		Diesel multiple unit	75	120	15	1985–1987
143 Pacer		Diesel multiple unit	75	120	14	1985–1986
150 Sprinter		Diesel multiple unit	75	120	6	1984–1987

Valley Lines' fleet was maintained at Cardiff Canton depot.

== Demise ==
In 2000 the Strategic Rail Authority announced its intention that a single all-Wales franchise should take over the majority of rail services in Wales. Accordingly, in October 2001, various operations of the Wales & West franchise were merged with those of Valley Lines to create Wales & Borders.

The Valley Lines brand identity and website continued to be used alongside Wales & Borders until the franchise passed from Wales & Borders to Arriva Trains Wales in December 2003.

Preceded by Regional Railways; As part of British Rail	Operator of Valley Lines franchise 1996–2001	Succeeded by Wales and Borders; Wales & Borders franchise
