= Flying Scotsman (railway service) =

London King's Cross to Edinburgh Waverley passenger train

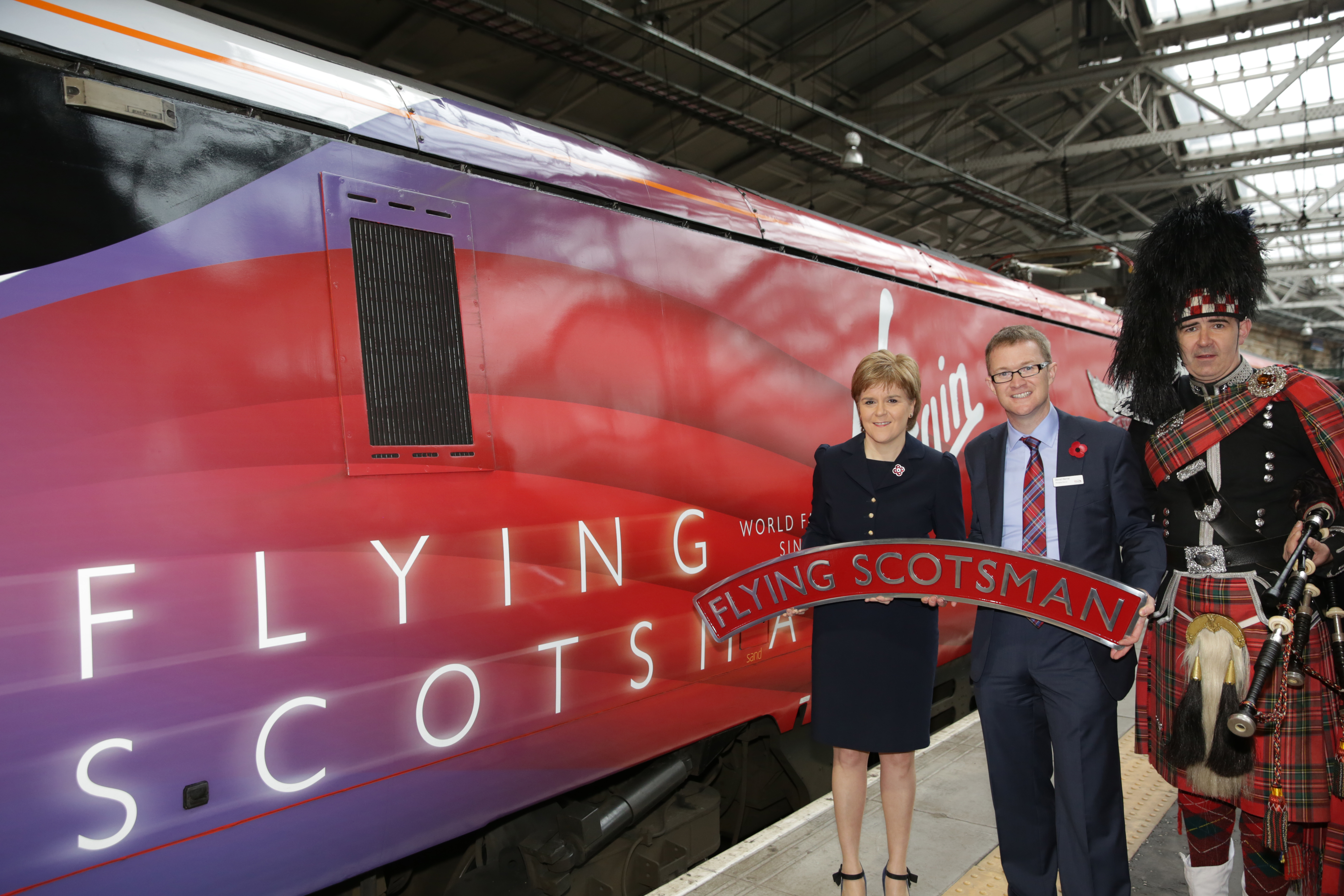
- 91101 at Edinburgh Waverley in October 2015

Overview
- Service type: Passenger train
- First service: 1862; 164 years ago (service); 1924; 102 years ago (name)
- Current operator: London North Eastern Railway
- Former operators: Virgin Trains East Coast; East Coast; National Express East Coast; GNER; InterCity East Coast; British Rail; London and North Eastern Railway

Route
- Termini: Edinburgh; London King's Cross
- Distance travelled: 393 miles (632 km)
- Average journey time: 4 hours
- Service frequency: Daily (Monday–Friday only)
- Train number: 1E01
- Line used: East Coast

Technical
- Rolling stock: Class 800; Class 801
- Track gauge: 1,435 mm (4 ft 8 1/2 in)
- Operating speed: 125 miles per hour (201 km/h)

The Flying Scotsman is an express passenger train service that operates between Edinburgh and London, the capitals of Scotland and England, respectively, via the East Coast Main Line. The service began in 1862 as the Special Scotch Express until it was officially adopted in 1924. It is currently operated by London North Eastern Railway and is one of the oldest continuously operating named railway services in the world.

== History ==
British Railways poster celebrating the centenary of the Flying Scotsman. The locomotives shown are a GNR Sturrock Single and a Class 55 Deltic

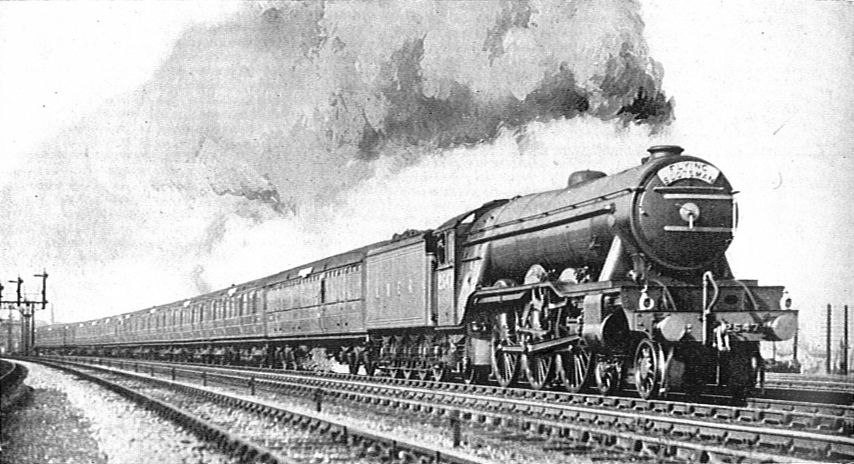
The Flying Scotsman hauled by LNER Class A1 No. 2547 Doncaster in 1928

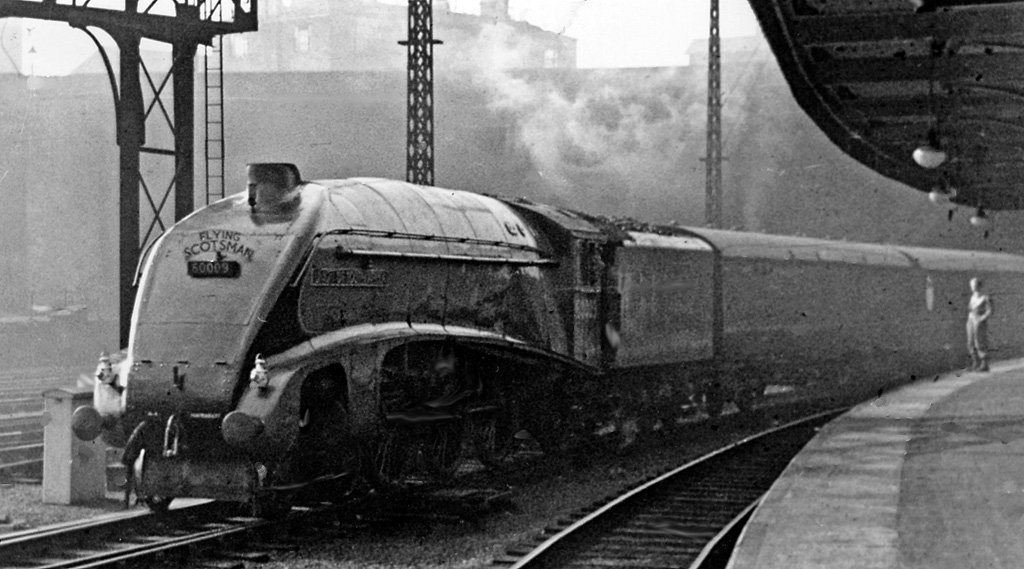
The Flying Scotsman hauled by 4488 Union of South Africa at London King's Cross in 1948

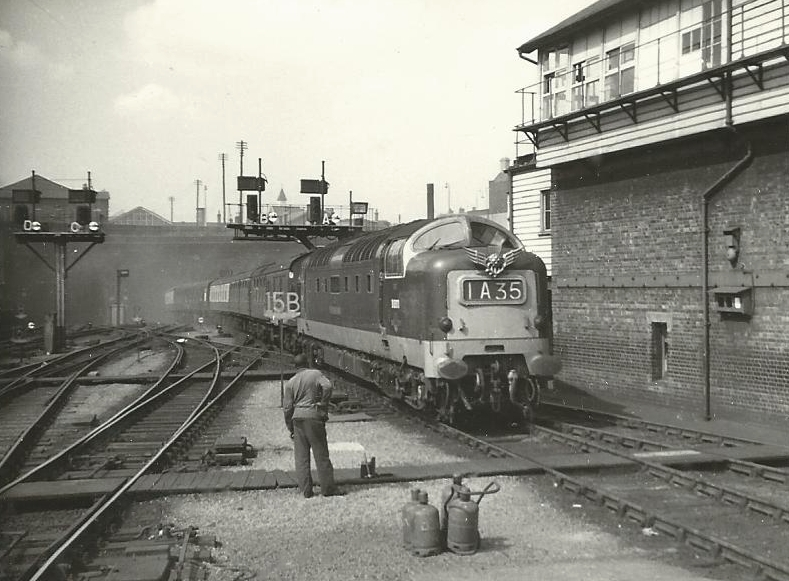
Deltic The Black Watch with the Flying Scotsman and headboard

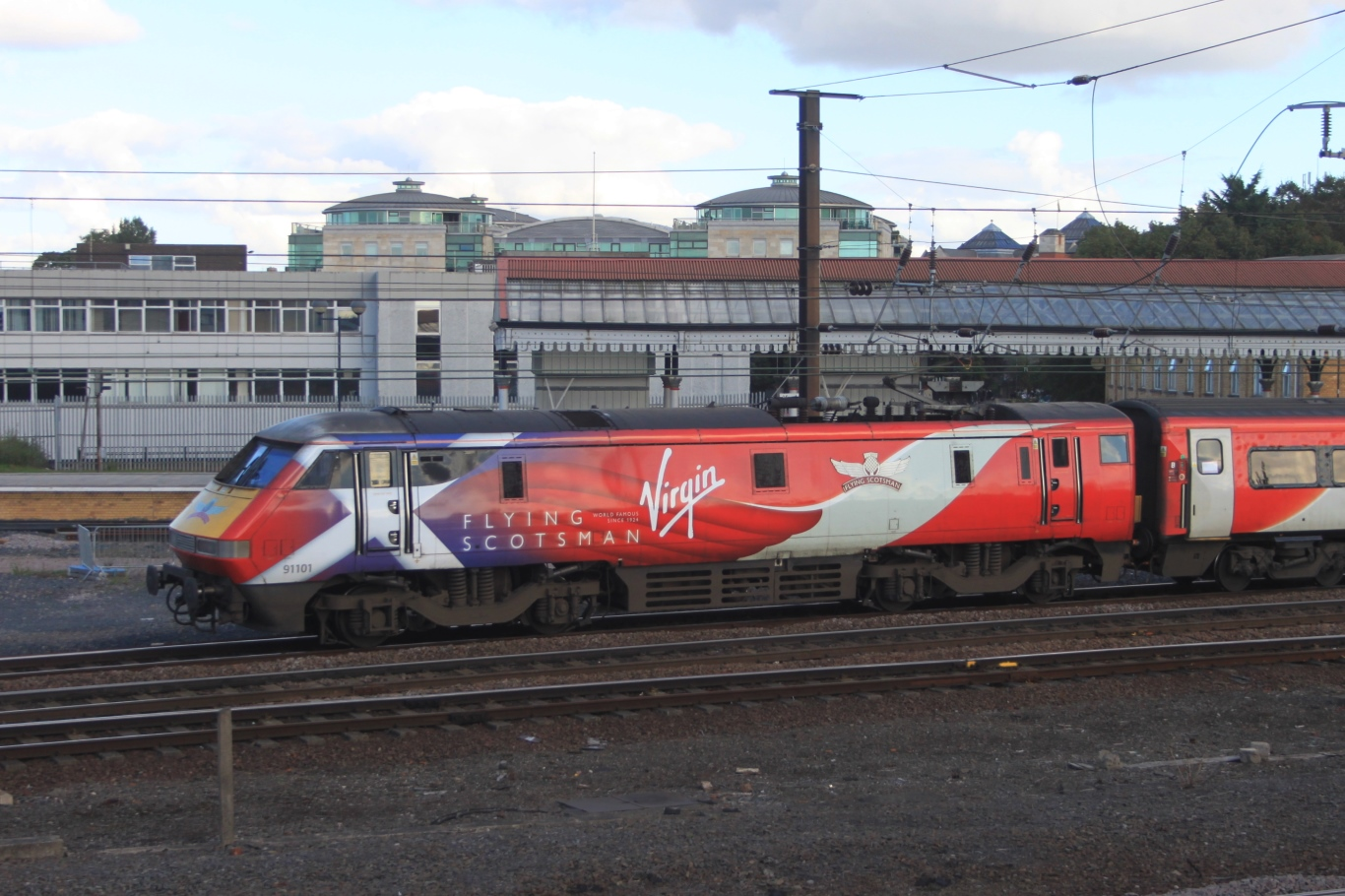
91101 in Flying Scotsman livery at York in October 2016

The East Coast Main Line over which the Flying Scotsman service runs was built in the 19th century by many small railway companies, but mergers and acquisitions led to only three companies controlling the route; the North British Railway (NBR), the North Eastern Railway (NER) and the Great Northern Railway (GNR). In 1860 the three companies established the East Coast Joint Stock for through services using common vehicles, and it is from this agreement that the Flying Scotsman came about.

=== Operation ===
The first Special Scotch Express ran in 1862, with simultaneous departures at 10:00 from the GNR's London King's Cross and the NBR's Edinburgh Waverley. The original journey took 10 1/2 hours, including a half-hour stop at York for lunch. Increasing competition and improvements in railway technology saw this time reduced to 8 1/2 hours by the time of the Race to the North in 1888.

From 1896, the train was modernised, introducing such features as corridors between carriages, heating, and dining cars. As passengers could now take lunch on the train, the York stop was reduced to 15 minutes, but the end-to-end journey time remained 8 1/2 hours. Like the earlier carriages built for the service, this rolling stock was jointly owned by the three operating companies, and formed part of the pool known as the East Coast Joint Stock.

=== London and North Eastern Railway ===
In 1923, the railways of Britain were grouped into the 'Big Four'. As a consequence of this, all three members of the East Coast Joint Stock became part of the newly formed London and North Eastern Railway (LNER).

In 1924, the LNER officially renamed the 10:00 Special Scotch Express linking Edinburgh and London in both directions to Flying Scotsman, its unofficial name since the 1870s. To further publicise the train, a recently built A1 Class locomotive – at first numbered 1472 and, subsequently, 4472 – was named after the service and put on display at the 1924 British Empire Exhibition.

Due to a long-standing agreement between the competing West Coast and East Coast Main Line routes since the famous railway races of 1888 and 1895, speeds of the Scotch expresses were limited, the time for the 392 miles (631 km) between the capitals being a pedestrian eight hours 15 minutes. However, subsequent to valve gear modifications, the A1 locomotive's coal consumption was drastically reduced, and it was thus found possible to run the service non-stop with a heavy train on one tender full of coal. Ten locomotives of Classes A1 and A3, which were to be used on the service, were provided with corridor tenders; these avoided engine crew fatigue by enabling a replacement driver and fireman to take over halfway without stopping the train.

During the General Strike on 10 May 1926, the Flying Scotsman was derailed by strikers near Newcastle.

No. 4472 hauled the inaugural non-stop train from London on 1 May 1928, and it successfully ran the 392 miles (631 km) between Edinburgh and London without stopping, a record at the time for a scheduled service (although the London, Midland and Scottish Railway had four days earlier staged a one-off publicity coup by running a non-stop Royal Scot service from Euston to Edinburgh via Glasgow—399.7 miles (643.3 km)). The Flying Scotsman had improved catering and other on-board services—even a barber's shop. With the end of the limited speed agreement in 1932, journey time came down to 7 hours 30 minutes, and by 1938 to 7 hours 20 minutes.

==== Corridor tenders ====
The non-stop runs were achieved with a special corridor tender which had an increased coal capacity of nine tons instead of the usual eight. A driver and fireman were able to access the locomotive from the train through a narrow passageway inside the tender tank plus a flexible bellows connection linking it with the leading coach. The passageway, which ran along the right-hand side of the tender, was 5 feet (1.52 m) high and 18 inches (0.46 m) wide. Further corridor tenders were built at intervals until 1938, and eventually there were 22; at various times, they were coupled to engines of classes A1, A3, A4 and W1, but by the end of 1948, all were running with class A4 locomotives. Use of the corridor tender for changing crews on the move in an A4 locomotive is shown in the 1953 British Transport Films' Elizabethan Express, the name of another London-to-Edinburgh non-stop train.

=== British Rail ===
In the late 1950s British Railways (BR) was committed to dieselisation, and began devising a replacement for the Gresley Pacifics on the East Coast Main Line. On 6 October 1958, haulage of the service by Class 40s commenced. In 1962 Class 55 Deltics took over, becoming a centrepiece of BR advertising, as the steam-hauled one had been for the LNER.

Under BR, the Flying Scotsman ceased to be a non-stop train, calling at Newcastle, York and Peterborough. It also operated at times beyond Edinburgh. On 1 June 1981, the northbound journey was extended to Aberdeen. The southbound journey commenced from Glasgow Queen Street at 09:05 until 4 October 1982 when the name was transferred to the 07:30 from Aberdeen.

=== Privatisation ===
The Flying Scotsman name has been maintained by the operators of the InterCity East Coast franchise since the privatisation of British Rail; the former Great North Eastern Railway even subtitled itself The Route of the Flying Scotsman. The Flying Scotsman was operated by GNER from April 1996 until November 2007, then by National Express East Coast until November 2009, East Coast until April 2015, and Virgin Trains East Coast until June 2018. Since then it has been operated by the government-owned London North Eastern Railway.

On 23 May 2011 the Flying Scotsman brand was relaunched for a special daily fast service operated by East Coast departing Edinburgh at 05:40 and reaching London in exactly four hours, calling only at Newcastle, operated by an InterCity 225 Mallard set. 91 class locomotive 91101 and Driving Van Trailer 82205 were turned out in a special maroon livery for the launch of the service. East Coast said bringing back named trains would restore "a touch of glamour and romance". However, for the first time in its history, it ran in one direction only: there is no northbound equivalent service. In October 2015, 91101 and 82205 were revinyled in a new Flying Scotsman livery.

LNER's new "Azuma" units (Class 800s and Class 801s) took over the service on 1 August 2019. From 14 December 2025, the service began calling at York, increasing the journey time to 4 hours 13 minutes. Northbound, the fastest timetabled London to Edinburgh service (The Carolean Express) now takes 4 hours 8 minutes.

Starting with the May 2026 timetable, the Flying Scotsman name will be used for the 10:00 Edinburgh to London with a timetabled journey time of 4 hours 11 minutes and 10:30 London to Edinburgh services with a timetabled journey time of 4 hours 9 minutes, therefore restoring the named service in both directions.

== The Flying Scotswoman ==
To celebrate International Women's Day on 6 March 2020, LNER rebranded the service the Flying Scotswoman for a month. On 6 March 2020 the service was staffed entirely by women, displayed a special International Women's Day livery and hosted a range of women from a variety of organisations in the rail industry as well as from LNER.

== Locomotives ==
As a major link between the capital cities of England and Scotland, the Flying Scotsman was an extremely long and heavy train, especially in the days before road and air transport became common. As such, it has required very powerful locomotives. Locomotives used to haul (and in some cases, specifically designed to haul) the Flying Scotsman have included:

- Stirling 4-2-2 'Singles' (GNR 1870)
- Ivatt Class C1 (GNR 1897), the first British Atlantics
- Gresley A1 and A3 Class Pacifics (LNER 1922), including the locomotive named after the train
- Gresley A4 Class Pacifics (LNER 1935), the holder of the steam rail-speed record
- British Railways Class 40 (BR 1958)
- British Railways Class 55 Deltic (BR 1961)
- British Rail InterCity 125 (BR 1976, GNER 1996–2007, NXEC December 2007 – November 2009, EC 2009–2015, VTEC from 2015)
- British Rail InterCity 225 (BR 1990, GNER from 1996 until 2007, National Express East Coast from December 2007 until November 2009, East Coast from November 2009 to March 2015, Virgin Trains East Coast from April 2015 to June 2018, and London North Eastern Railway from June 2018 to July 2019)
- Classes 800 and 801 Azuma (London North Eastern Railway from 1 August 2019)
