= East Coast Trains =

East Coast Trains may refer to one of these UK train operators:

- East Coast (train operating company), former operator of the InterCity East Coast franchise from 2009 until 2015
- Lumo (train operating company), an open-access operator which commenced services in October 2021, and trading name of East Coast Trains Limited
