= Christopher Garnett (disambiguation) =

Christopher Garnett may refer to:

- Christopher Garnett, member of the Board of the Olympic Delivery Authority
- Christopher Garnett (politician), British politician
- Chris Garnett, youth worker for PETA
