= National Express East Coast =

UK train operating company

- InterCity 125 HST in 2009

Overview
- Franchises: InterCity East Coast; 9 December 2007 – 13 November 2009
- Main regions: London; East of England; East Midlands; Yorkshire; North East England; Scotland
- Fleet: 14 InterCity 125 HST sets; 31 InterCity 225 sets; 5 Class 180 Adelante units (never used)
- Stations called at: 53
- Stations operated: 12
- Parent company: National Express Group
- Reporting mark: GR
- Predecessor: GNER
- Successor: East Coast

Other
- Website: nationalexpresseastcoast.com

National Express East Coast (NXEC) was a British train operating company, owned by National Express, that operated the InterCity East Coast franchise on the East Coast Main Line between London, Yorkshire, North East England and Scotland from December 2007 until November 2009.

During December 2006, the previous franchisee Sea Containers, operating via its subsidiary Great North Eastern Railway (GNER), was stripped of the franchise after failing to meet overly-generous payments. During August 2007, National Express was awarded the franchise via a competitive tender; its bid was criticised for having offered similarly onerous payments to GNER. Within months of commencing operation in December 2007, NXEC became known for its cost-cutting measures and a noted drop in service level. The company became unable to meet its payment obligations, having forecast greater ridership than actually experienced while fuel costs had risen considerably. By early 2009, National Express was in talks with the government over possible financial assistance with the franchise. Months later, in light of National Express' plan to default on the franchise, the Department for Transport announced that the franchise would be re-nationalised. Hence, operations passed to the state-owned train operating company East Coast on 14 November 2009.

== History ==
=== Background ===
The original InterCity East Coast franchise was awarded to the Bermuda-based transport and container leasing company Sea Containers, which operated it from April 1996 until April 2005 via its subsidiary Great North Eastern Railway (GNER). Within only a few years, the future franchising arrangements of the East Coast route had already begun to be evaluated. During March 2000, the Shadow Strategic Rail Authority announced that two companies, Sea Containers and Virgin Rail Group, had been shortlisted to bid for the next franchise. During January 2002, the Strategic Rail Authority announced that the refranchising process had been scrapped, with an interim extension to GNER's contract being given as a stopgap measure. During October 2004, the Strategic Rail Authority issued the Invitation to Tender for the InterCity East Coast franchise to the four shortlisted bidders, Danish State Railways/English Welsh & Scottish, First, GNER and Virgin Rail Group.

Sea Containers emerged as the victor, being awarded a new seven-year franchise by the Department for Transport, commencing in May 2005, along with an option for a three-year extension dependent on performance targets being met. However, the awarding was subject to criticism that, amid aggressive bidding between the competing companies, GNER had committed itself to fulfilling an overly generous arrangement that may not be financially realistic, and was accused as having overbid to secure the franchise. During the original franchise, the company had been receiving subsidies from the British government to support its operations; however, the terms of the second franchise reversed this to have the operator making payments to the government, specifically a £1.3-billion premium which was due to the Department for Transport over a ten-year period. Within two years, the company's financial difficulties had become a public concern, particularly those of its parent company.

In July 2006, rumours began circulating that Sea Containers would be prepared to sell its GNER franchise in an effort to stave off resorting to Chapter 11 proceedings to secure itself from its creditors. In October 2006, Sea Containers filed for bankruptcy protection under the US Chapter 11 process, During December 2006, the Department for Transport announced its intention to strip Sea Containers of its franchise, although GNER continued to operate the franchise on a fixed fee management contract in the interim while another competitive tender was organised.

=== Tender and award ===
In February 2007, the Department for Transport announced that Arriva, First, National Express and Virgin Rail Group had been shortlisted to lodge bids for the new franchise. In August 2007, the Department for Transport awarded the Intercity East Coast franchise to National Express, leading to the creation of National Express East Coast (NXEC) shortly thereafter.

Under the terms of its franchise agreement, National Express committed to paying a £1.4-billion premium to the Department of Transport over a time span of seven years and four months. However, numerous rail analysts at the time promptly voiced concerns that the company had paid too much for the franchise, and had effectively repeated GNER's mistake in order to secure the franchise. According to industry periodical Rail, even the Department of Transport had classified National Express' bid as having "medium risk", although this would not be made public until years later. Professor Felix Schmid of the University of Birmingham's Centre for Railway Research and Education, has claimed that National Express had gambled that it would receive a significant amount of revenue via compensatory payments for delays attributable to the East Coast's infrastructure owner, Network Rail. Furthermore, National Express had allegedly spent a reported £23 million in its attempts to retain or win new franchises around this period, and had been stripped of several, including Midland Mainline, Gatwick Express and Silverlink, which may have motivated the company's management team to be more generous to emerge with something from its efforts.

National Express's bid had included the stated ambition to increase capacity on its services, specifically to add up to 25 extra services each weekday from December 2010 along with a direct London-Lincoln train that would be operated at two-hourly intervals. However, there was no mention of any new trains for achieving this capacity increase; instead, a number of recently withdrawn British Rail Mark 3 coaches that had been previously operated by Virgin West Coast would be transferred over to NXEC's control. Other promised improvement included the introduction of free Wi-Fi for passengers travelling in standard class, the provision of an additional 2,000 car parking spaces in close proximity to a number of its major stations, and a general reduction in journey times.

=== Operations ===
On 9 December 2007, NXEC commenced operations. Prior to this, the company's management had decided that, rather than incorporate (wholly or in part) the existing GNER branding, a fresh brand would to be adopted, including a distinct new livery intended to embody modernity; this would be rolled out over a two-year period. According to Rail, the franchise, NXEC quickly garnered a reputation for cost-cutting and a decline in service levels, particularly in terms of the onboard catering.

By 2009, NXEC was under increasing financial pressure due to various factors, including compounding rises in fuel prices and the poor economic climate of the time, commonly known as the Great Recession. In contrast to the company's projected revenue increases during its franchise, NXEC's actual operating income (generated primarily from ticket sales) had decreased by 1 per cent during the first half of 2009.

Seeking to generate additional revenue to meet this shortfall, NXEC introduced a charge of £2.50 per journey leg for seat reservations. The introduction of these fees was largely met with dissatisfaction from the travelling public.

During April 2009, National Express confirmed that the company was still pursuing talks with the government over possible financial assistance with the franchise, either through a reduction in the premium due or some other form of assistance. This quickly led to speculation that the franchise was increasingly likely to be terminated entirely.

=== Demise ===
In July 2009, it was announced that National Express had plans to default on the franchise, having failed to renegotiate the contractual terms of operation; National Express stating that it would not be providing any further financial support necessary to ensure NXEC remained solvent. This meant NXEC would run out of cash by the end of 2009. As a consequence of this decision, the Department for Transport announced it would establish a state-owned company to take over the franchise from National Express.

During prior negotiations, the company had reportedly offered to pay over £100 million to be released from its commitment to operate the franchise. Transport Secretary Lord Adonis had rejected this proposal on a matter of principle, stating: "The government is not prepared to renegotiate rail franchises, because I'm simply not prepared to bail out companies that are unable to meet their commitments". In defaulting on the franchise, under the franchising system, National Express only directly incurred losses of £72 million by forfeiting bonds. The franchise failure sparked public and industry calls for the permanent state ownership of the InterCity East Coast franchise, or even the complete scrapping of the entire franchise system. In response, Lord Adonis reiterated the findings of a 2008 National Audit Office report, which had concluded that the rail franchising system delivered good value for money and steadily improving services.

National Express East Coast continued to operate the franchise until 23:59 on 13 November 2009, when the Department for Transport took over through its East Coast subsidiary.

== Services ==
NXEC's principal routes were from London King's Cross to Leeds and Edinburgh Waverley.

In off-peak times, there were three or four trains per hour to and from King's Cross. The following details apply to weekday operations.

=== Principal routes ===
==== London–Leeds ====
The service between King's Cross and Leeds was generally half-hourly, with all trains serving Wakefield Westgate, most trains serving Peterborough and Doncaster and some serving Stevenage, Grantham, Newark and Retford.

==== London–Newcastle–Edinburgh ====
A half-hourly service between King's Cross and Newcastle operated for most of the day, departing from London on the hour and on the half-hour. The 'top of the hour' departures continued through to Edinburgh Waverley (with the 10:00 departure keeping the traditional name Flying Scotsman), with a two-hourly extension to Glasgow Central. These trains generally ran as limited-stop expresses between London and Newcastle, all trains called at York, and most at Peterborough and Darlington, though afternoon and evening departures from King's Cross ran non-stop to Doncaster or York. The trains leaving King's Cross on the half-hour generally terminated at Newcastle and served Stevenage, Grantham, Newark, Retford, Northallerton, Doncaster and Durham as well as Peterborough, York, and Darlington.

=== Other routes ===
==== London/Leeds–Aberdeen ====
There were four trains per day serving Aberdeen departing Leeds at 07:10 and King's Cross at 10:30 (The Northern Lights), 14:00 and 16:00 and Aberdeen at 07:52, 09:52 (The Northern Lights) and 14:50 for King's Cross and 18:16 for Edinburgh with a journey time from King's Cross of just over seven hours. These services were operated by HSTs, as the Edinburgh–Aberdeen line was not electrified.

==== London–Inverness ====
The Highland Chieftain ran between Inverness and King's Cross with a journey time of just over eight hours, departing Inverness at 07:55 and King's Cross at 12:00. This service was operated by a HST, as the Edinburgh – Dunblane and Dunblane – Inverness lines were not electrified.

==== London–Hull ====
The Hull Executive ran between Hull and King's Cross, departing Hull at 07:00 and King's Cross at 17:20. This service was operated by a HST as the Temple Hirst Junction – Hull Line was not electrified.

==== London–Skipton ====
There was a 06:55 departure from Skipton and Keighley to King's Cross with an 18:03 return. This was an extension of a Leeds – King's Cross service. Though the line was electrified, the service was operated using a HST because the electrical infrastructure on the line was insufficient to support a Class 91 locomotive and the Class 333 EMUs that operate the local services. The Saturday running of the southbound service was the only NXEC southbound service from Leeds not to call at Wakefield Westgate. This service departed from Leeds and headed along the Leeds – Selby Line to join the East Coast Main Line at Hambleton. This was to retain driver route knowledge for diversionary services.

==== London–Bradford Forster Square ====
There was a 06:30 service from Bradford Forster Square to King's Cross with a 17:33 return. This was an extension of a Leeds – King's Cross service and was operated by an InterCity 225 set.

==== London–Harrogate ====
There was a Monday-Saturday 07:28 departure from Harrogate to King's Cross. However, there was no return journey. This was operated by an InterCity 125.

=== Named trains ===
NXEC operated the following named passenger trains:

- The Hull Executive London–Hull / Hull–London
- The Northern Lights London–Aberdeen / Aberdeen–London
- The Highland Chieftain London–Inverness / Inverness–London
- The Flying Scotsman London–Edinburgh Waverley / Glasgow Central–London

=== Proposed routes ===
==== London–Lincoln ====
A franchise commitment was to introduce a fifth service out of King's Cross each hour, operating to Lincoln and York on alternate hours from December 2010. It was reportedly proposed for NXEC to lease four Class 90 locomotives and additional Mark 3 coaches for use on the Leeds and York services, while HSTs were intended for use on the Lincoln services. These plans were later shelved, while five Class 180s were leased instead. It was anticipated that one early morning train would start from Cleethorpes, serving Grimsby Town and Market Rasen, with one evening service to Lincoln extended to Cleethorpes.

== Rolling stock ==
NXEC inherited from GNER a fleet of InterCity 125 High Speed Train sets made up of Class 43 power cars and Mark 3 carriages, and InterCity 225 sets made up of Class 91 locomotives and Mark 4 carriages and Driving Van Trailers. The HSTs were part way through an overhaul program, the power cars being overhauled by Brush Traction at Loughborough and re-engined with MTU 16V4000 engines, and the carriages being refurbished by Wabtec Rail at Doncaster. This programme was completed in 2009.

NXEC offered free Wi-Fi to passengers in both first and standard class.

To operate proposed new services from 2010, five Class 180 Adelante units were leased. These were never operated in revenue-earning service with NXEC, although three were sublet to Northern Rail during October 2008.

During 2009, a HST that had been on lease while the fleet was refurbished, was returned to Porterbrook and sent to First Great Western.

Fleet at end of franchise
Class	Image	Type	Top speed		Number	Routes operated	Built
Class	Image	Type	mph	km/h	Number	Routes operated	Built
InterCity 125 trains (HSTs)
Class 43		Diesel locomotive	125	200	30	London King's Cross – Aberdeen; London King's Cross – Inverness; London King's Cross – Hull; London King's Cross – Skipton; London King's Cross – Harrogate; Leeds – Aberdeen	1976–1982
Mark 3 carriage		Passenger carriage	125	200	117	London King's Cross – Aberdeen; London King's Cross – Inverness; London King's Cross – Hull; London King's Cross – Skipton; London King's Cross – Harrogate; Leeds – Aberdeen	1975–1988
InterCity 225 trains
Class 91		Electric locomotive	140	225	31	London King's Cross – Leeds; London King's Cross – Edinburgh; London King's Cross – Glasgow Central; London King's Cross – Bradford Forster Square; London King's Cross – Newcastle	1988–1991
Mark 4 carriage		Passenger carriage	140	225	302	London King's Cross – Leeds; London King's Cross – Edinburgh; London King's Cross – Glasgow Central; London King's Cross – Bradford Forster Square; London King's Cross – Newcastle	1989–1992
Driving Van Trailer		Control car	140	225	31	London King's Cross – Leeds; London King's Cross – Edinburgh; London King's Cross – Glasgow Central; London King's Cross – Bradford Forster Square; London King's Cross – Newcastle	1988

Proposed fleet
Class	Image	Type	Top speed		Number	Routes operated	Built
Class	Image	Type	mph	km/h	Number	Routes operated	Built
Class 180 Adelante		DMU	125	200	5	London King's Cross – Edinburgh	2000–2001

Preceded by Great North Eastern Railway	Operator of InterCity East Coast franchise 2007–2009	Succeeded by East Coast
