= Christopher Garnett =

British businessman (born 1946)

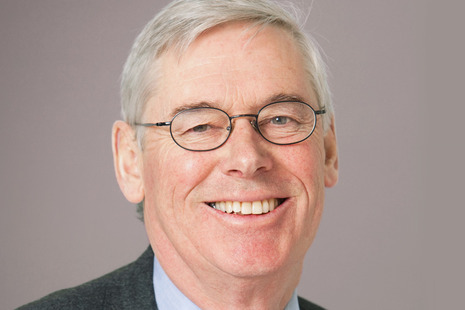
- Garnett in 2012
- Born: 10 January 1946 (age 80)
- Occupation: Businessperson

Christopher Garnett OBE (born 10 January 1946) is a retired British businessperson who served as a member of the Board of the Olympic Delivery Authority for London 2012, and was previously the Chief Executive Officer of Great North Eastern Railway and simultaneously Senior Vice President and Chief Executive of the Rail Division of Sea Containers, GNER's parent company.

Before this, Garnett was Regional Manager - Eastern Division for Sealink when it was a Sea Containers subsidiary, before becoming Commercial Director of Eurotunnel. He later returned to Sea Containers to lead their successful bid to operate the InterCity East Coast passenger rail franchise, which commenced as part of the privatisation of British Rail in April 1996. This seven-year contract was extended by two years in 2003, before GNER won a new contract in 2005. Garnett also presided over this deal, which saw GNER commit to paying the UK government GBP1.3 billion in premia - a record transaction for European railways. Beyond GNER, Garnett led Sea Containers' bids for other British passenger rail operations, including the South Western, South Eastern and Greater Western franchises.

Garnett left GNER towards the end of August 2006 amid growing concerns over Sea Containers' financial stability and, consequently, speculation over the future of GNER, with Sea Containers' largest shareholder Conner & Birdwell saying "[Sea Containers] will be liquidated and sold." (see Rail Magazine, 'Culture of fear' grips GNER, issue 546). This was alongside a High Court judgement rejecting GNER's application for a judicial review over Grand Central's access to the East Coast Main Line. However, his departure was apparently of his own volition, despite earlier speculation in Edinburgh Evening News that he would stand down.

== Honours ==
He was appointed Officer of the Order of the British Empire (OBE) in the 2013 New Year Honours for services to the London 2012 Olympic and Paralympic Games.

== Family ==
Garnett is the son of (William) John Garnett, CBE, the British industrial relations campaigner, the brother of headhunter and former Conservative politician Virginia, Baroness Bottomley, the nephew of former Labour politician Peggy, Baroness Jay. Garnett's late wife was The Hon. Su Garnett née Swann, elder daughter of Michael, Baron Swann; she died on 23 April, 2022.
