= InterCity 225 =

British inter-city electric train

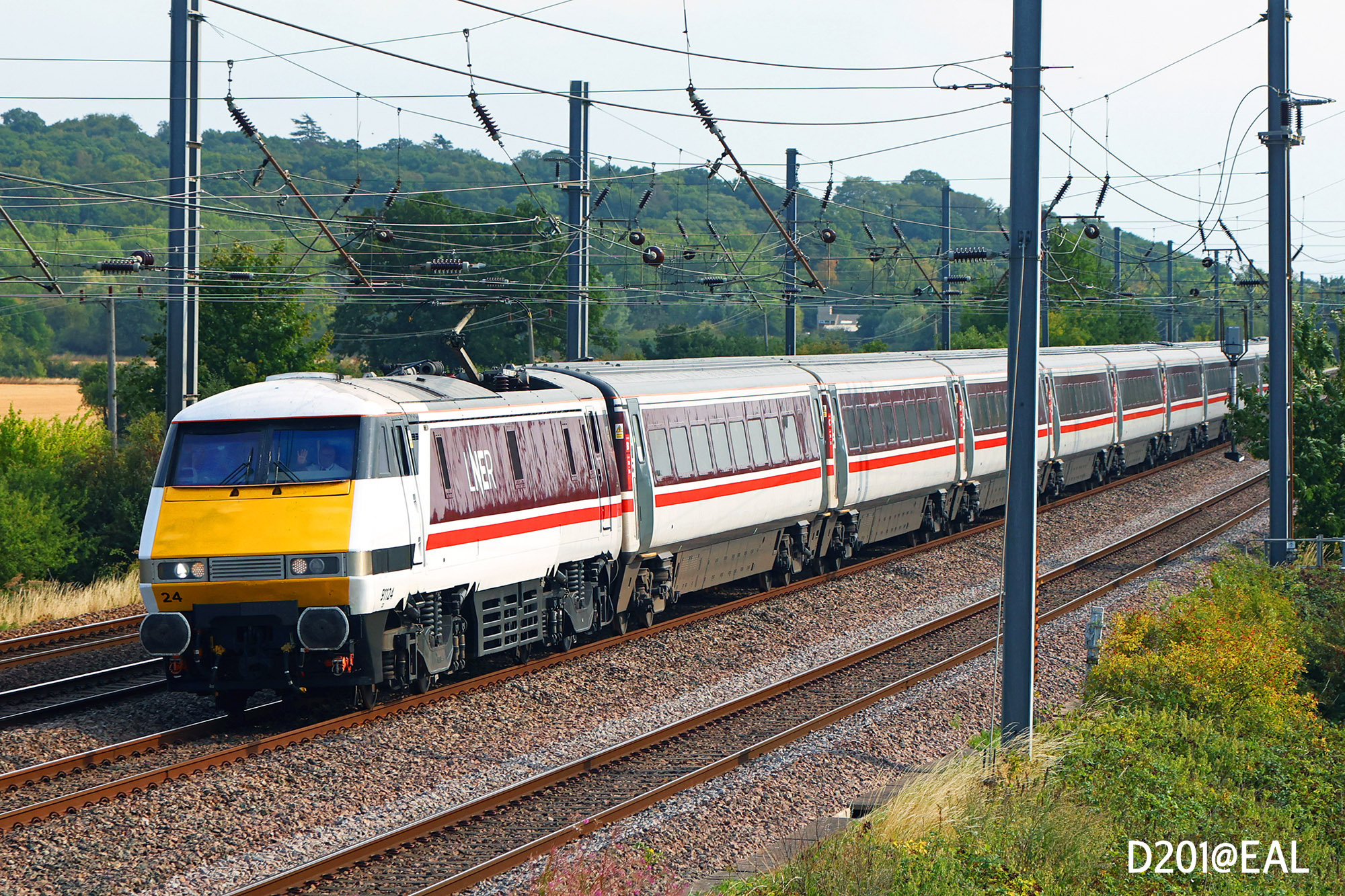
- An LNER InterCity 225 on the East Coast Main Line

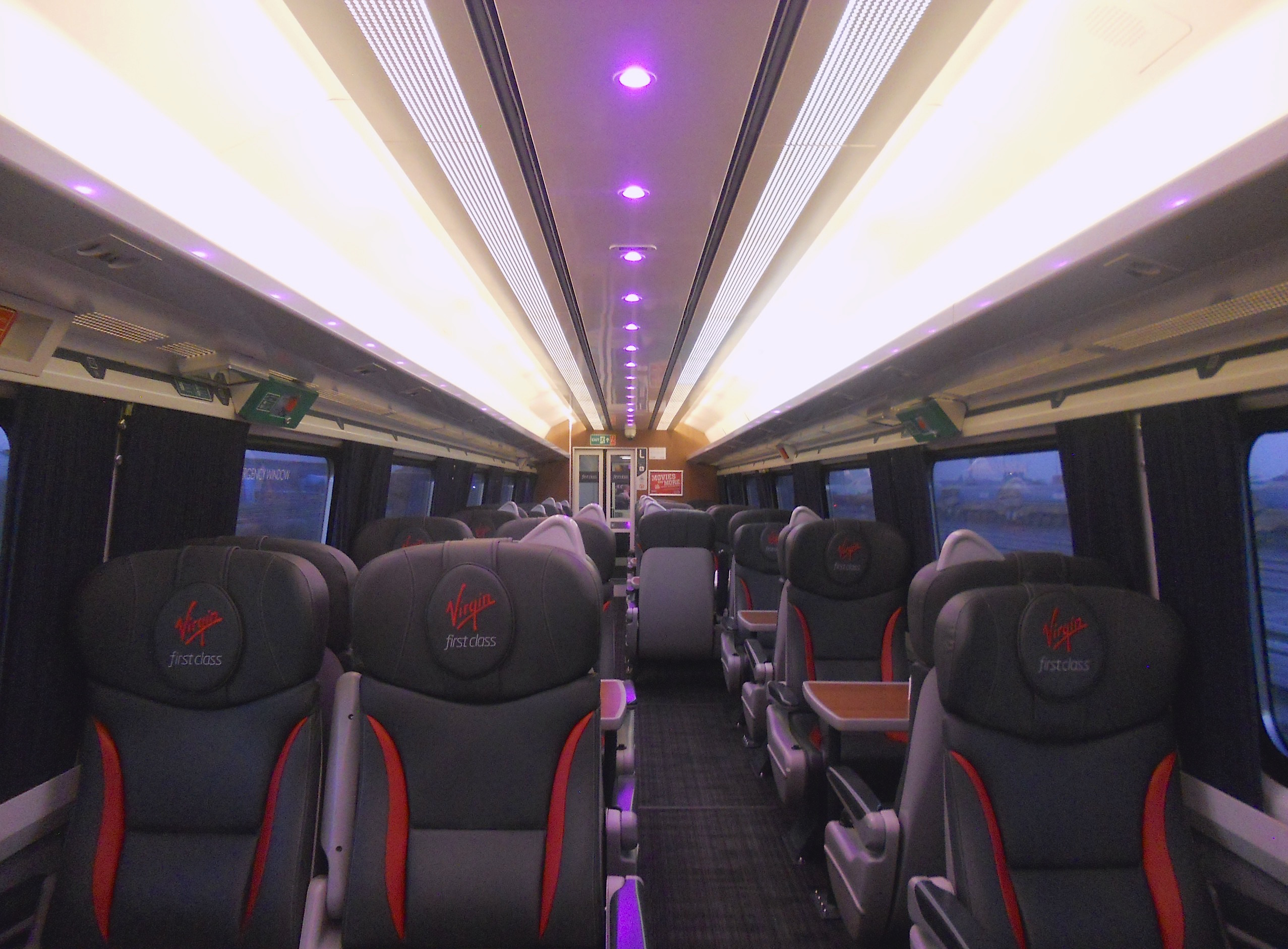
- Virgin Trains East Coast refurbished First Class carriage
- Manufacturers: BREL, GEC-Alsthom, Metro-Cammell
- Constructed: 1988-1991
- Number built: 31 nine-carriage units
- Successor: Class 800; Class 801; Class 897
- Operators: Current: London North Eastern Railway; Past: InterCity (British Rail), Great North Eastern Railway, National Express East Coast, East Coast, Virgin Trains East Coast

Specifications
- Train length: 245.23 m (804 ft 7 in)
- Maximum speed: 125 mph (201 km/h)
- Traction system: Electric
- Power output: 6,300 horsepower (4.7 MW)
- UIC classification: Bo′Bo′+2′2′+...+2′2′+2′2′

The InterCity 225 is an electric push-pull high speed train in Great Britain, each originally comprising a Class 91 electric locomotive, nine Mark 4 coaches and a Driving Van Trailer (DVT). The Class 91 locomotives were built by British Rail Engineering Limited's Crewe Works as a spin-off from the Advanced Passenger Train (APT) project, which was abandoned during the 1980s, whilst the coaches and DVT were constructed by Metro-Cammell in Birmingham and Breda (under sub-contract) in Italy, again borrowing heavily from the APT. The trains were designed to operate at up to 140 mph (225 km/h) in regular service, but are limited to 125 mph (200 km/h) principally due to a lack of cab signalling and the limitations of the current overhead line equipment. They were introduced into service between 1989 and 1991 for inter-city services on the East Coast Main Line (ECML) from London King's Cross to Leeds, York and Edinburgh Waverley. In late 2025, the remaining sets in use were reduced to seven carriages in order that they could keep to the timings for LNER's new timetable.

== History ==
=== Background ===
The origin of the InterCity 225 is closely associated with the ECML upon which it has been primarily operated. During the 1950s, British Rail had considered electrification of the ECML to be of equal importance to the West Coast Main Line (WCML), but various political factors led to the envisioned electrification programme being delayed for decades; as an alternative, high-speed diesel traction, including the Class 55 Deltics and InterCity 125, was introduced upon the route during the 1960s and 1970s. During the 1970s, a working group of British Rail and Department for Transport officials determined that, out of all options for further electrification, the ECML represented the best value by far. Its in-house forecasts determined that increases in revenue and considerable reductions in energy and maintenance costs would occur by electrifying the line.

Accordingly, between 1976 and 1991, the ECML was electrified with 25 kV AC overhead lines. The electrification was installed in two phases: The first phase between London King's Cross and Hitchin (including the Hertford Loop Line) was carried out between 1976 and 1978 as the Great Northern Suburban Electrification Project, using Mk.3A equipment, covering 30 miles in total. In 1984, the second phase commenced to electrify the Northern section to Leeds and Edinburgh Waverley. During the late 1980s, the programme was claimed to be the longest construction site in the world, spanning more than 250 miles (400 km).

During 1989, the InterCity 225 was officially introduced to revenue service. That same year, the ECML had been energised through to York; two years later, electrification had reached Edinburgh, allowing electric services to begin on 8 July 1991, eight weeks later than scheduled. The ECML electrification programme was completed at a cost of £344.4 million (equivalent to £1,171 million in 2025), a minor overrun against its authorised expenditure of £331.9 million. Forty per cent of the total cost was on new traction and rolling stock, with 60 per cent for the electrification of the line.

=== Options and selection ===
The electrification of the ECML necessitated the procurement of new high speed electric traction. The options and requirements for this trainset were hotly deliberated for a number of years. On 7 June 1978, the electric-powered prototype APT was unveiled; it was at one point intended for the APT to be the next major inter-city express train. However, due to various factors including technical issues, the APT programme was curtailed during the summer of 1989. Shortly thereafter, two alternative options were explored: an electrified version of the InterCity 125 (known as the HST-E) and the Class 89 mixed-traffic locomotive; these were both intended to a peak service speed of 125 mph (201 km/h).

Some officials within British Rail (BR) pushed for more demanding requirements for the future InterCity trainset; reportedly, BR's Director of Mechanical and Electrical Engineering (M&EE) was a strong proponent for increasing the top speed to 140 mph (230 km/h) To facilitate this, tilting train technologies developed for the APT were explored. While BR's board had approved the ordering of a single Class 89 as a prototype, the Strategy Committee queried why the type had been favoured over a proposed 80-tonne Bo-Bo locomotive. While the Class 89 was thought to be a low-risk option for multi-purpose traction, it offered little advantage over the existing Class 87 in terms of speed. At the time, the 1950s era Class 81 and Class 85 electric locomotives were nearing the end of their viable service lives and were quite unreliable, but their withdrawal was effectively ruled out by a national shortage of newer electric traction, in part caused by the APT's cancellation.

A key advantage of the InterCity 225 concept over a Class 89-hauled consist was the lower weight of the former, resulting in less slippage and greater acceleration over the latter. Appraisals also determined that the Class 89 was comparatively inferior in financial terms, in part due to the InterCity 225's prospective compatibility with WCML traction, reducing its development costs. A further cost-saving measure was the decision to base the InterCity 225's technologies on the APT; BR reportedly stated that it had derived 90% of the former's engineering from the latter. Thus, the study group recommended that the InterCity 225 be pursued as the preferred option, while the Class 89 and HST-E initiatives serve as back-ups. Despite this, the HST-E effort was promptly aborted, while Brush Traction decided to deprioritise work on the Class 89 after learning that it was unlikely to lead to volume production.

By spring 1984, favour was being given towards the adoption of a tilting carriage, tentatively designated as the Mk 4; this was viewed as superior to the existing Mk 3 and enabled a single design to be shared between the ECML and WCML. At one point, it was envisaged that the InterCity 225 would be ubiquitous, even potentially having the capability built into it to operate over the southern third-rail network and within the Channel Tunnel; by mid 1984, such fanciful ideas were curtailed. Furthermore, it was decided to reduce the freight haulage capabilities of the InterCity 225, as traction for this sector was instead intended to be served via other platforms. The emergence of the Class 90, derived from the existing Class 87, somewhat reduced the pressure for the InterCity 225, reducing the prospective numbers to be built of the latter. Without tilting carriages, it had little speed advantage over the Class 90 on the WCML.

It was decided to hold a competitive tender for the InterCity 225 programme; this measure was aimed at avoiding the difficulties experienced with the APT programme. A pre-qualification document was formalised, in which various requirements for the type were laid out; these included the need to perform mixed-traffic duties (day and night passenger, parcel and mail, and overnight heavy freight services), the haulage of both tilting and conventional rolling stock, a top speed of 225 km/h (140 mph), a maximum cant deficiency of 9° without the provision of tilt equipment, and that the maximum unsprung mass could not exceed 1.8 tonnes. Furthermore, BR stated its readiness to sub-contract with the successful bidder for the supply of technical information, advice and testing. The prequalification document was issued to British Rail Engineering Limited (BREL), Brush Traction and the General Electric Company (GEC), as well as the French firm Alsthom and Germany's Krauss Maffei. The inclusion of foreign manufacturers was in part due to the limited domestic experience with trainsets capable of such high top speeds. A total of three companies, ASEA, Brush Traction and GEC, submitted tenders for the design and construction of the Class 91 electric locomotive.

On 14 February 1985, the BR board approved the substitution of the Class 91 for Class 89 for the ECML programme. The tendering process was relatively complex, but a decisive move appeared to have been GEC's offer of a sub-contracting arrangement to BREL for the construction of the locomotive's mechanical elements. It would be GEC's submission that would be selected as the winner; after which a contract for the construction of 31 Class 91 locomotives, along with an option for 25 more for the WCML, was awarded during February 1986. Shortly thereafter, BREL established a production line for the type at its Crewe Works.

== Operations ==
The InterCity 225 entered service with InterCity on the ECML in 1989. In service, the InterCity 225 sets were used alongside other rolling stock, including Class 90 locomotives and Class 317 electric multiple units. The displaced diesel trains were reallocated predominantly to the Midland Main Line. The InterCity 225's introduction correlated with a significant increase in passenger numbers using the ECML within two years; one station recorded a 58 per cent increase in passengers.

The InterCity 225 was designed to achieve a peak service speed of 140 mph (225 km/h); during a test run in 1989 on Stoke Bank between Peterborough and Grantham, an InterCity 225 was recorded at a speed of 162 mph (260.7 km/h). Its high speed capabilities were again demonstrated via a 3 hours and 29 minutes non-stop run between London and Edinburgh on 26 September 1991. British regulations have since required in-cab signalling on any train running at speeds above 125 mph (201 km/h) preventing such speeds from being legally attained in regular service. Thus, except on High Speed 1, which is equipped with cab signalling, British signalling does not allow any train, including the InterCity 225, to exceed 125 mph (201 km/h) in regular service, due to the impracticality of correctly observing lineside signals at high speed.

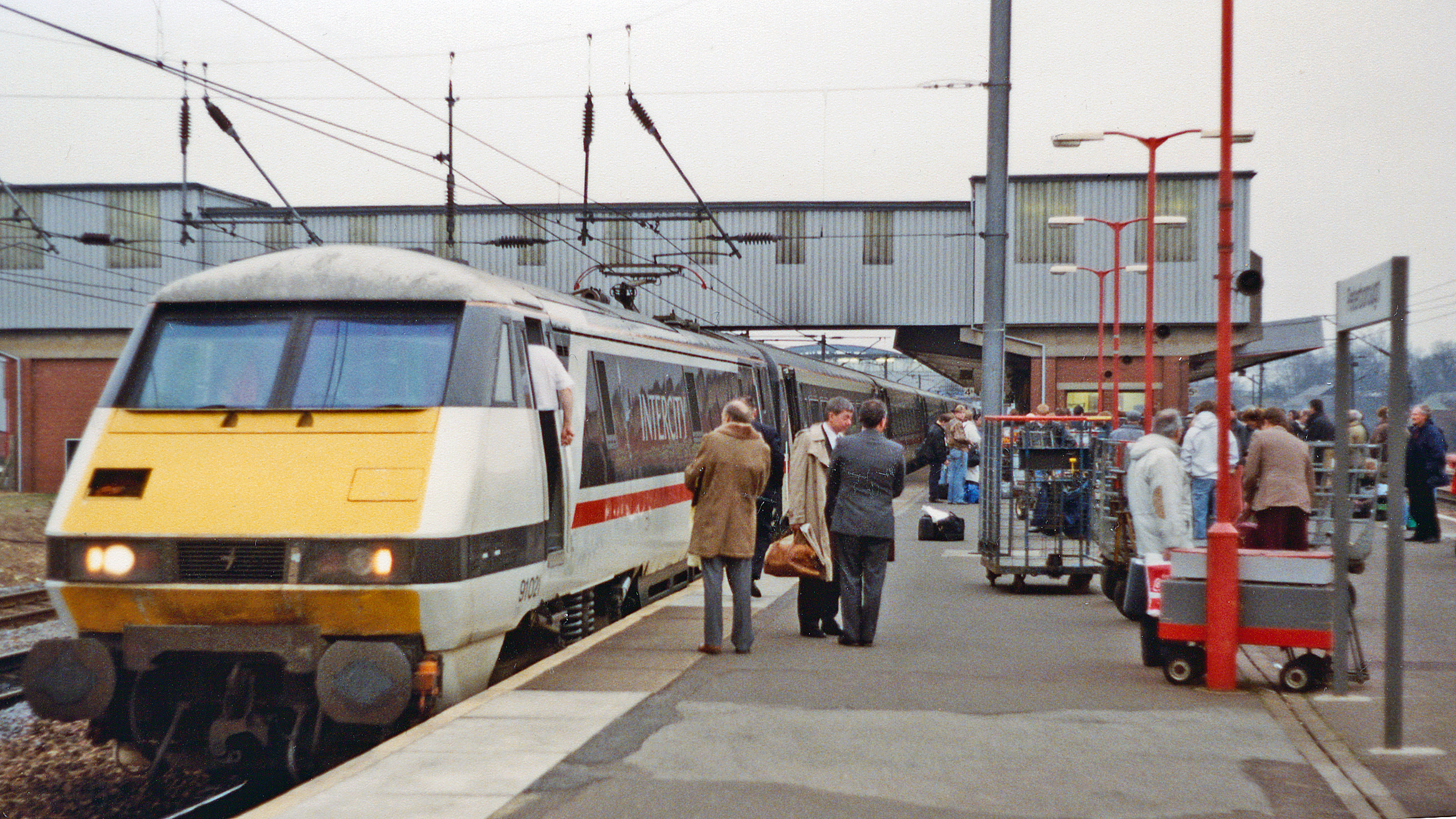
An InterCity 225 at Peterborough in 1992

The InterCity 225 has also operated on the WCML. In April 1992, one trainset achieved a new speed record of two hours, eight minutes between Manchester Piccadilly and London Euston, shaving 11 minutes off the 1966 record. During 1993, trials were operated to Liverpool Lime Street and Manchester Piccadilly in connection with the InterCity 250 project.

In 1996, as part of the privatisation of British Rail, all InterCity 225s were sold to Eversholt Rail Group. Since then, the trains have been leased to all operators of the InterCity East Coast franchise, which is presently operated by London North Eastern Railway (LNER). Between October 2003 and November 2005, Bombardier Transportation, under contract from Great North Eastern Railway (GNER), completed a rebuild and refurbishment programme for the Class 91 locomotives, DVTs and Mark 4 coaches called Project Mallard.

In July 2013, it was confirmed that the InterCity 225 fleet would be replaced as part of the Intercity Express Programme (IEP), a Department for Transport initiative to replace the InterCity 125 and InterCity 225 fleet on the East Coast Main Line and the Great Western Main Line. Introduced in the programme were Class 800 bi-mode and Class 801 electric trains from the Hitachi A-train family, of which the ECML sets were nicknamed Azuma after the Japanese word for "East".

In June 2018, new operator LNER inherited all 31 InterCity 225 sets from VTEC as part of the franchise. At this point, LNER had no intentions to retain any of the InterCity 225 sets due to high maintenance costs on the fleet. The first Class 800 entered service with LNER on 15 May 2019, allowing for the first withdrawal of an InterCity 225 set. The withdrawals have gradually continued as more of the new Azuma trains entered service and at the beginning of 2020, it was planned that the final InterCity 225 sets would leave LNER's fleet by June 2020. However, LNER decided to retain seven sets until 2023 to allow for services to be increased in December 2021. From September 2020, they ceased operating north of York until March 2026, where one daily return working the 14:33 London Kings Cross to Newcastle has yet again been booked to use InterCity 225s.

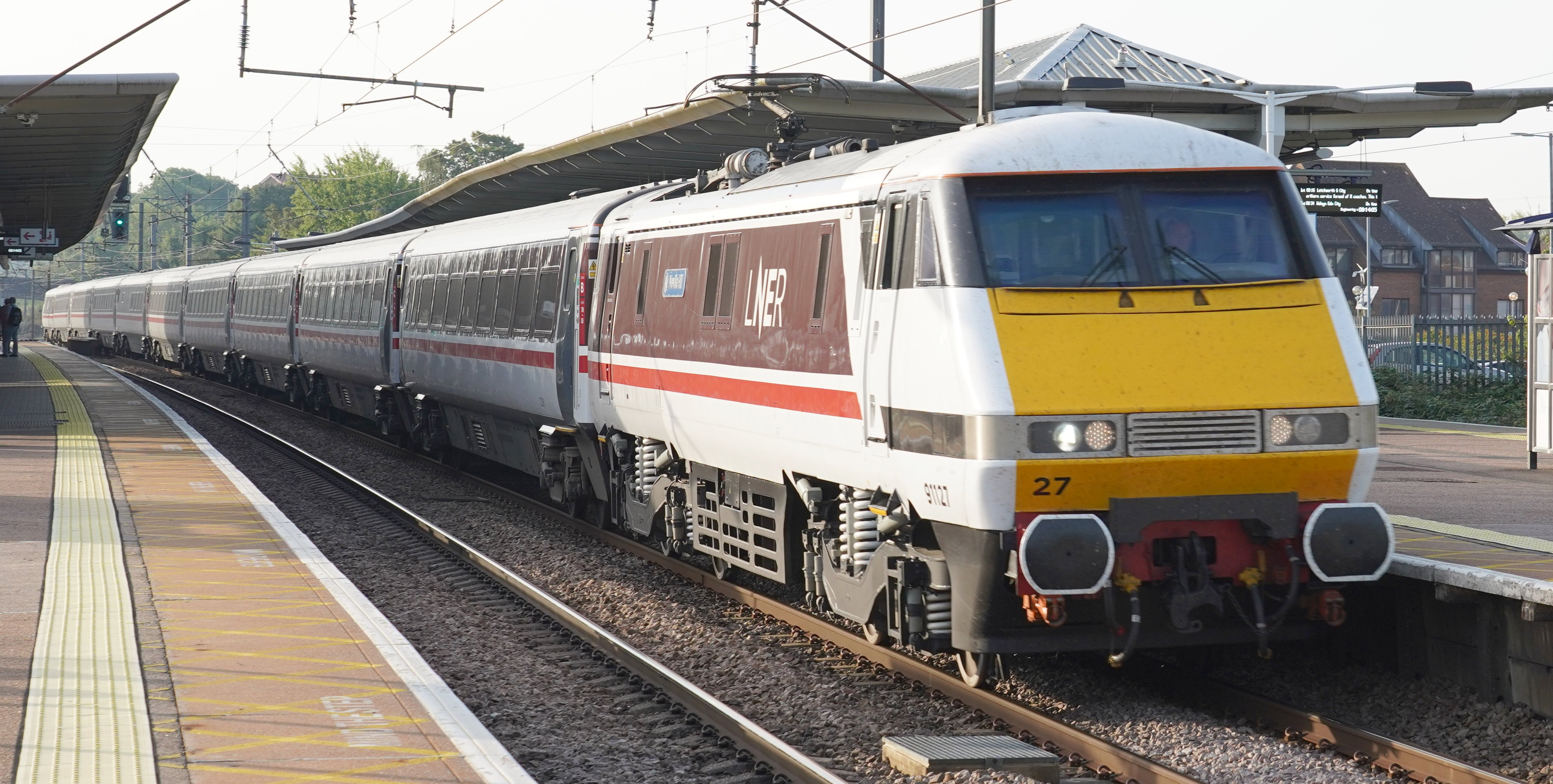
An LNER InterCity 225 at Potters Bar in 2023

With LNER returning the majority of their InterCity 225 sets to Eversholt Rail Group, it has been announced that other companies would be obtaining some of the Mark 4 carriages and Driving Van Trailers. Transport For Wales have leased 12 Mark 4 carriages to replace Mark 3 coaches on its Premier Service. Prospective operator Grand Union proposed to operate the InterCity 225 on London Paddington to Cardiff Central services from December 2020 and London Euston to Stirling services from May 2021.

From May 2020, Grand Central was planning to begin using Mark 4 carriages on its new London Euston to Blackpool North services with Class 90 locomotives hauling six-carriage sets. However, these plans were subsequently axed as part of Grand Central's recovery plan due to the COVID-19 pandemic. After losing the West Coast Partnership franchise, Virgin Rail Group had proposed using InterCity 225s on an open access service from London Euston to Liverpool.

In September 2020, Eversholt and LNER extended their lease of seven IC225 sets, with ten Class 91 locomotives, to summer 2023, with an option to extend to summer 2024. They were overhauled at the Wabtec Doncaster plant.

At the end of service on 15 January 2021, the remaining serviceable InterCity 225 sets went into storage temporarily as part of the East Coast Upgrade. Originally, the plan was to return the sets to service for 7 June 2021, but instead the first set re-entered service on 11 May 2021 for a short time due to a number of Class 800 Azuma sets having to be taken out of service.

In late 2025, the remaining 225 sets were reduced to seven carriages (from the previous nine carriages) for acceleration reasons in LNER's December 2025 timetable. As of 2026, LNER has twelve Class 91 locomotives and eight sets of coaches, which run four diagrams per day with one set on standby.

== Capacity and formation ==
The original formation of the InterCity 225 sets is below:

- Class 91 electric locomotive (north end)
- Coach B – Standard Class – 76 seats – WC
- Coach C – Standard Class – 76 seats – WC
- Coach D – Standard Class – 76 seats – WC
- Coach E – Standard Class – 76 seats – WC
- Coach F – Standard Class – 72 seats – Accessible Toilet
- Coach H – Standard Class/Kitchen – 30 seats – WC
- Coach K – First Class – 43 seats – WC + 2 crew areas
- Coach L – First Class – 40 seats – accessible toilet
- Coach M – First Class – 46 seats – WC
- Coach P – Driving Van Trailer (London end)

The total numbers of seats were 406 standard class and 129 first class, an overall capacity of 535 seats.

As part of the December 2025 timetable change, coaches E and M were removed from the sets, giving a new capacity of 330 standard class and 83 first class, a total of 413 seats.

== Preservation ==
In early 2023, 91131 entered preservation at the Museum of Scottish Railways in Bo’ness, West Lothian. As the last high-speed locomotive built for British Rail, the last locomotive built at Crewe Works, and holder of a 154mph speed record, it was protected under the 1996 Railway Heritage Act.

As of Friday 6 February 2026, Two Intercity 225 Mark 4 coaches, numbers 11412 & 11426 were purchased from Beacon Rail have been preserved by 225 Preservation

== Scale models ==
Railway models of the Intercity 225 locomotive, coaches and DVT in 00 gauge have been produced by Hornby since 1988, and updated periodically since then.
