= East Coast (train operating company) =

Train operator in England

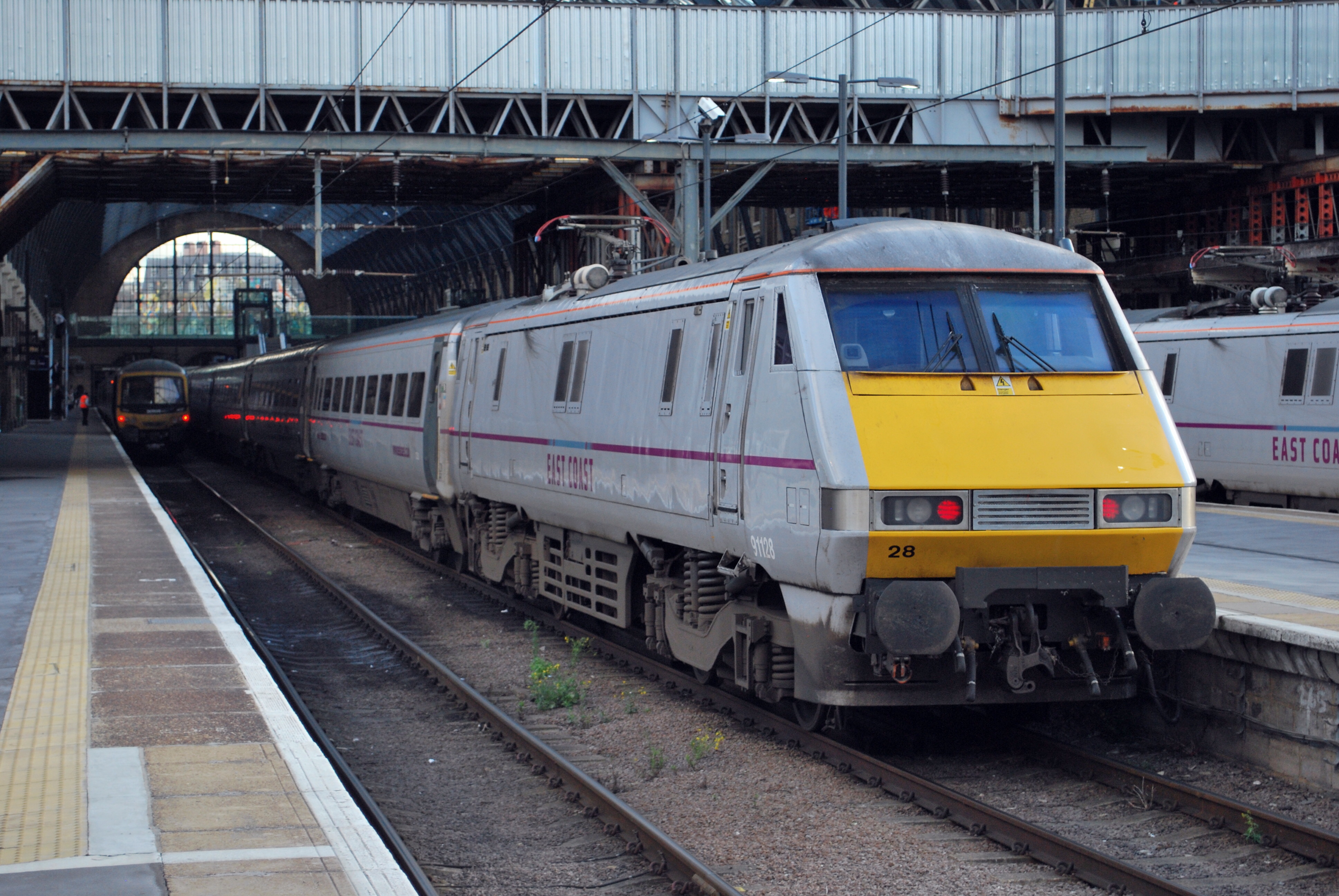
- Class 91 locomotive at London King's Cross in August 2012

Overview
- Franchise: InterCity East Coast
- Main regions: Greater London; East of England; East Midlands; Yorkshire and the Humber; North East England; Scotland
- Fleet: 31 Class 91 electric locomotives; 30 InterCity 225 sets; 14 InterCity 125 (HST) sets
- Stations called at: 53
- Stations operated: 12
- Parent company: Directly Operated Railways
- Reporting mark: GR
- Dates of operation: 14 November 2009–28 February 2015
- Predecessor: National Express East Coast
- Successor: Virgin Trains East Coast

Other
- Website: www.eastcoast.co.uk

East Coast, the trading name of the East Coast Main Line Company, was a state-owned British train operating company running the InterCity East Coast franchise on the East Coast Main Line between London, Yorkshire, North East England, and Scotland. East Coast ran long-distance inter-city services from its Central London terminus at London King's Cross on two primary routes; the first to Leeds and the second to Edinburgh via Newcastle with other services reaching into Yorkshire and Northern and Central Scotland. It commenced operations on 14 November 2009 and ceased on 28 February 2015.

East Coast was a subsidiary of Directly Operated Railways, formed by the Department for Transport as an operator of last resort when National Express refused to provide further financial support to its National Express East Coast (NXEC) subsidiary and consequently lost its franchise. The franchise was re-nationalised on 14 November 2009, with the day-to-day operations continuing normally on the whole. Within one year, East Coast's rolling stock begun to be re-liveried in a new silver scheme intentionally styled so that future operators of the franchise could easily apply their own branding following their takeover of operations. During May 2011, East Coast launched the "Eureka" programme, which involved numerous service changes, including an overhauled timetable and complimentary catering for First Class passengers. On the whole, service levels remained relatively steady and unchanged throughout East Coast's tenure.

From the onset of East Coast's operations, the Department for Transport had publicly stated its long term intention for the franchise was for it to be retendered and thus return to a private franchisee; this was originally set to occur by December 2013. However, during March 2013, the Secretary of State for Transport announced that this transfer had been postponed to February 2015 instead. In January 2014, FirstGroup, Keolis/Eurostar and Stagecoach/Virgin were announced as the shortlisted bidders for the new franchise. The franchise passed to Virgin Trains East Coast on 1 March 2015.

== History ==
=== Background ===
The original InterCity East Coast franchise was awarded to the Bermuda-based transport and container leasing company Sea Containers, which operated it from April 1996 until April 2005 via its subsidiary Great North Eastern Railway (GNER). While Sea Containers successfully bid for the award of a new seven-year franchise by the Department for Transport (DfT) commencing in May 2005; the award was subject to criticism that, amid aggressive bidding between the different companies competing for the franchise, GNER had committed itself to fulfilling an overly generous arrangement that may not be financially realistic, and was accused as having overbid to secure the franchise. During the original franchise, the company had been receiving subsidies from the British government to support its operations; however, the terms of the second franchise reversed this to have the operator making payments to the government, specifically a £1.3-billion premium which was due to the DfT over a ten-year period. Within two years, the company's financial difficulties had become a public concern.

In October 2006, Sea Containers filed for bankruptcy protection under the US Chapter 11 process, During December 2006, the DfT announced its intention to strip Sea Containers of its franchise, although GNER continued to operate it via an interim fixed fee management contract while another competitive tender was organised. In February 2007, the DfT announced that Arriva, First, National Express and Virgin Rail Group had been shortlisted to lodge bids for the new franchise. In August 2007, the DfT awarded the Intercity East Coast franchise to National Express, leading to the creation of National Express East Coast (NXEC) shortly thereafter.

Under the terms of its franchise agreement, National Express committed to paying a £1.4-billion premium to the DfT over a time span of seven years and four months. However, numerous rail analysts at the time promptly voiced concerns that the company had paid too much for the franchise, and had effectively repeated GNER's mistake in order to secure the franchise. According to railway industry periodical Rail, NXEC quickly garnered a reputation for cost-cutting and a decline in service levels, particularly in terms of the onboard catering. By 2009, NXEC was under increasing financial pressure due to various factors, including compounding rises in fuel prices and the poor economic climate of the time, commonly known as the Great Recession. During April 2009, National Express confirmed that it was pursuing talks with the government over possible financial assistance with the franchise, either through a reduction in the premium due or some other form of assistance.

=== Formation ===
In July 2009, it was announced that National Express was intending to default on the franchise, having failed to renegotiate the contractual terms of operation; National Express stating that it would not be providing any further financial support necessary to ensure NXEC remained solvent. This meant NXEC would run out of cash by the end of 2009. As a consequence of this decision, the DfT announced it would establish a state-owned company to take over the franchise from National Express. The failure of the NXEC franchise sparked widespread calls amongst industry officials and members of the public for the InterCity East Coast franchise to be permanently placed into state ownership, or even the complete scrapping of the entire franchise system. In response, the Secretary of State for Transport Lord Adonis reiterated the findings of a 2008 National Audit Office (NAO) report which had concluded that the rail franchising system delivered good value for money and steadily improving services.

On 13 November 2009, NXEC relinquished its operation of the franchise, at which point the DfT took over through its newly formed subsidiary, East Coast.

=== Changes ===
According to Rail, East Coast's management strategy was typically adverse to initiating changes and that relatively little had changed across the organisation's operations during its eight years of running the franchise. Karen Boswell, the managing director of East Coast, disputed this observation and pointed to substantial investment in terms of both staff and assets since assuming control of the franchise in 2009, and also observed that the operation was financially sound and that East Coast had become one of Britain's most profitable train operating companies by 2015.

During May 2011, East Coast introduced a major new timetable known as "Eureka"; changes included an extra three million seats per year, a decrease in general journey times and the adoption of a more regular service pattern. Within a few years of these changes, both train performance and punctuality figures had noticeably improved. Beyond the timetable changes, the Eureka programme was accompanied by various service changes, such as a nearly £10 million investment in staff training and to modernise its catering carriages, facilitating the introduction of complimentary catering for all First Class travellers.

Prior to October 2010, East Coast offered free Wi-Fi to passengers in both First and Standard Class coaches. From 5 October 2010, the operator introduced a charge of £4.99 per hour or £9.99 for 24 hours for only Standard Class passengers; a 15-minute free allowance was still provided. In 2011, East Coast announced an investment of £600,000 for upgrading Wi-Fi equipment across its fleet, these new uplinks used a combination of satellites and lineside 3G/HSPA masts.

On 28 February 2015, the final operating day of East Coast, Virgin branding and public relations material begun to be deployed at various stations. Furthermore, East Coast's website, Twitter and Facebook pages were updated overnight to reflect Virgin's branding. That same day, multiple coordinated anti-privatisation protests were held in several cities, including Edinburgh, Doncaster and London, which were organised by the National Union of Rail, Maritime and Transport Workers (RMT). On 1 March 2015, Virgin Trains East Coast assumed operations.

== Principal services ==
=== London – Leeds ===
This was the busiest East Coast service – half-hourly, with one train per hour serving Peterborough, Doncaster, Wakefield Westgate and Leeds, while the other served Stevenage, Grantham, Doncaster, Wakefield Westgate and Leeds. At weekends, they called at Stevenage every two hours while Peterborough, Grantham, Newark, Doncaster and Wakefield were served hourly.

=== London – Newcastle ===
East Coast operated a half-hourly service between King's Cross and Newcastle (one fast, one semi-fast) throughout the day, departing from London on the hour and the half-hour. The top-of-the-hour trains were part of the London to Scotland services which ran as limited-stop expresses between London and Newcastle (as seen below). The half-hour train called at Peterborough, Newark, Doncaster, York, Northallerton, Darlington, Durham and terminated at Newcastle, although there was an extension of this service to Edinburgh every two hours. At weekends, all daytime services to Newcastle continued through to Edinburgh, with some going non-stop. Late evening services terminated at Newcastle.

=== London – Edinburgh ===
This was East Coast's flagship route, serving the whole length of the East Coast Main Line; an hourly service from London to Edinburgh Waverley, calling at York, Darlington, Newcastle, Berwick-upon-Tweed and Edinburgh. Some of these trains also called at Peterborough. Occasionally there was a half-hourly service to Edinburgh with some Newcastle trains extended at peak hours. At weekends all services on the half-hour continued to Edinburgh from Newcastle.

During the day, services to London King's Cross from Edinburgh ran every 30 minutes, one fast and one semi-fast. All trains called at Newcastle and most at Berwick upon Tweed, Darlington and York. In May 2011 East Coast re-introduced the historic Flying Scotsman service. This was an early-morning service to London King's Cross with a journey time of four hours, departing Edinburgh Waverley at 05:40, calling only at Newcastle at 07:03 and arriving at London at 09:40.

=== London – Newark/York ===
An hourly service ran between King's Cross and Newark, calling at all intermediate stations. This was extended to York every two hours, serving Retford and Doncaster and at peak times was extended to Newcastle. These services operated only on weekdays. Additional services also start/terminated at Doncaster or Peterborough at peak times.

A Map of East Coast Services showing the service pattern each hour and extensions

== Limited service ==
=== London–Glasgow ===
There was only one direct through train per day in each direction between King's Cross and Glasgow Central departing Glasgow at 06:50 and departing King's Cross at 15.30 as an extension of a London to Newcastle service also calling at Edinburgh. There were no East Coast service to Glasgow on Saturdays.

=== London–Aberdeen ===
These trains were extensions to the hourly London-to-Edinburgh service. There were three trains per day each way between King's Cross and Aberdeen, departing at 10:00 (The Northern Lights), 14:00 and 16:00 (weekdays only), the journey time being just over seven hours. There was also one service per day in each direction between Leeds and Aberdeen. These services were operated by InterCity 125 sets, as the Edinburgh to Aberdeen line and York to Leeds section via Garforth were not electrified. This route crossed the historic Forth, Tay and Montrose bridges.

=== London–Inverness ===
This was an extension of a London-to-Edinburgh service with a daily service operating between King's Cross and Inverness, departing at 12:00 with the southbound service departing Inverness at 7:55 (09–40 Sundays), named the Highland Chieftain. The journey took just over eight hours and was operated by InterCity 125 sets, as the line between Edinburgh and Inverness was not electrified.

=== London–Bradford ===
One train per day in each direction ran between Bradford Forster Square and King's Cross via Leeds. This used an electric InterCity 225 train as the route was fully electrified. This service offered the fastest journey time of 1hr 59m, only stopping at Wakefield Westgate on the way to London.

=== London–Skipton ===
There was a morning train from Skipton to King's Cross with an early evening return. It was an extension of the London to Leeds service. Though the line to Skipton was electrified throughout, the East Coast service to/from the town was initially operated using a diesel HST because the electrical infrastructure on the Leeds to Skipton line was insufficient to support a Class 91 locomotive in addition to the Class 333 electric multiple units that operated the local services from Leeds to Skipton.

However, tests took place on 16 January 2011 for the operation of InterCity 225s on this service. From the timetable starting 22 May 2011, the evening return train from Kings Cross was worked by an InterCity 225 (Monday – Fridays only).

The Saturday run of the outward service was the only East Coast service serving Leeds not to call at Wakefield Westgate: after Leeds, this service took the route via Micklefield and Hambleton Junctions to Doncaster. Although the other trains to/from Skipton used the InterCity 225, the Saturday run of the outward service used the InterCity 125 because the alternative route used was not fully electrified.

=== London–Lincoln ===
From May 2011, a direct train ran between King's Cross and Lincoln Central, with one service per day in each direction as an extension of the London – Newark service. This service used a diesel InterCity 125 set as the Nottingham to Lincoln line was not electrified.

=== London–Hull ===
The Hull Executive ran between King's Cross and Hull, with one train per day each way. This service also used InterCity 125 sets, as the Hull line was not electrified. More frequent services between King's Cross and Hull were operated by First Hull Trains.

=== London–Harrogate ===
There was a daily morning departure from Harrogate to King's Cross and an evening return. This service used a diesel InterCity 125 set as the Harrogate Line is not electrified.

== Named trains ==
East Coast operates a number of named passenger trains, including:

Name	Origin	Destination	Other details
Flying Scotsman	London King's Cross	Edinburgh Waverley	Service began 1862 in both directions; named by the LNER in 1924
Highland Chieftain	London King's Cross	Inverness	1tpd both ways, the longest East Coast route
Hull Executive	London King's Cross	Hull	
Northern Lights	London King's Cross	Aberdeen	1tpd both ways

== Rolling stock ==
East Coast inherited the rolling stock operated by NXEC, comprising InterCity 125 High Speed Train sets made up of Class 43 power cars and Mark 3 carriages, and InterCity 225 sets made up of Class 91 electric locomotives and Mark 4 carriages and Driving Van Trailers. This same rolling stock dated back to the British Rail era, with some of the HSTs approaching 40 years old by the end of East Coast's operation.

The original franchise holder, GNER, undertook a major refurbishment of its rolling stock from 2003, which it titled "Project Mallard". The Mark 4 carriages were upgraded and refurbished between 2003 and 2005, while work on refurbishing the Mark 3 carriages started under GNER in early 2007 and continued under NXEC, with the final set completed in October 2009. The Mallard interiors were used throughout East Coast's tenure; Rail magazine alleged that, by 2015, some sets were looking particularly worn and in need of another refurbishment or wholesale replacement.

Some minor changes were made to the InterCity 225 fleet, perhaps the most noticeable of which was their repainting into East Coast's silver livery. This repaint was started in June 2010, with the first full set (excluding loco) being released on 30 July 2010. A key concept behind the new livery was that a plain base livery would be readily customisable to suit any potential future operator of the franchise.

Fleet at end of franchise
Class	Image	Type	Top speed		Number	Routes operated	Built
Class	Image	Type	mph	km/h	Number	Routes operated	Built
InterCity 125 trains (HSTs)
Class 43		Diesel locomotive	125	200	32	London King's Cross to Lincoln Central, Harrogate, Hull Paragon, Aberdeen and Inverness. Also Skipton to London King's Cross (Saturdays only) and Leeds to Aberdeen	1976–1982
Mark 3 carriage		Passenger carriage	125	200	117	London King's Cross to Lincoln Central, Harrogate, Hull Paragon, Aberdeen and Inverness. Also Skipton to London King's Cross (Saturdays only) and Leeds to Aberdeen	1975–1988
InterCity 225 trains
Class 91		Electric locomotive	140	225	31	London King's Cross to Leeds, Bradford Forster Square, Newark North Gate, Skipton, York, Newcastle, Edinburgh Waverley and Glasgow Central	1988–1991
Mark 4 carriage		Passenger carriage	140	225	302	London King's Cross to Leeds, Bradford Forster Square, Newark North Gate, Skipton, York, Newcastle, Edinburgh Waverley and Glasgow Central	1989–1992
Driving Van Trailer		Control car	140	225	31	London King's Cross to Leeds, Bradford Forster Square, Newark North Gate, Skipton, York, Newcastle, Edinburgh Waverley and Glasgow Central	1988

=== Unused fleet ===
East Coast leased five Class 180 Adelante diesel multiple units from Angel Trains with the intention of using them on proposed additional services from London King's Cross to Lincoln and Harrogate. In the event, they never operated in revenue-earning service with East Coast, as the proposed services were never introduced and the units did not find favour with East Coast's parent company Directly Operated Railways. Three of the units were sublet to Northern Rail for use on services from Manchester to Preston and Blackpool, before all five were returned to their original operator, First Great Western, for use on the Cotswold Line.

=== Cancelled fleet ===
East Coast investigated the use of a single 11-coach Pendolino from July 2011, but ultimately decided instead to lease an extra HST set from East Midlands Trains from May 2011, bringing the number of HSTs leased to East Coast to 14.

=== Locomotive naming ===
The fleet of Class 91 locomotives inherited by East Coast has carried various names up until 2008. In 2011, in response to customer requests, East Coast resumed the practice. It began by naming 91109 as Sir Bobby Robson, unveiled in a ceremony at Newcastle station on 29 March 2011 by his widow Elsie and Alan Shearer, patron of the Sir Bobby Robson Foundation, which the company was also now a supporter of.

On 2 June 2012, 91110 was renamed Battle of Britain Memorial Flight by Carol Vorderman at the National Railway Museum as part of the Railfest 2012 Event.

On 16 February 2013, 91107 was renamed Skyfall and temporarily returned to its original 91007 number to mark the James Bond film of the same name, which featured trains extensively and became the highest-grossing film of all time in the United Kingdom.

On 14 October 2014, 91111 was unveiled to mark the 100th anniversary of World War I. The specially designed East Coast locomotive, named For The Fallen, carries a livery filled with images, stories and tributes to regiments and people who served in them across the East Coast route.

== Performance ==
The public performance measure (PPM) shows the percentage of trains which arrive at their terminating station on time. It combines figures for punctuality and reliability into a single performance measure. The moving annual average PPM for East Coast by the end of its franchise (P12 2014–14) was 88.2%.

Unlike the majority of rail franchises, East Coast was a profitable ongoing concern. It paid back in excess of £1 billion to the British government over the course of its franchise.

== Loyalty scheme ==
East Coast inherited the 'escape' loyalty scheme from National Express which was eventually rebranded as East Coast Rewards. The original scheme involved giving benefits to customers who spent over £1,750 in a three-month period on East Coast tickets. Benefits included first class lounge access for the member and a guest, discounts at partner retailers, 20% off online advance ticket booking and a large number of free first class travel tickets.

As this scheme had a high barrier to entry East Coast launched a revamped loyalty scheme in 2011 which was points based and included all spend on the East Coast website even if booking travel for other operators. The scheme meant rewards such as free travel were now within reach of a greater number of passengers as only a modest spend was required to earn benefits. The scheme initially launched with online bookings only but was then expanded to cover season tickets and business travel.

== TV series ==
In November 2013, Sky1 started to broadcast a documentary series "All Aboard East Coast Trains". One of the InterCity 225 sets was painted in a special blue livery which includes faces of employees that feature in the programmes in order to promote the series.

Preceded by National Express East Coast	Operator of InterCity East Coast franchise 2009–2015	Succeeded by Virgin Trains East Coast
