= Great North Eastern Railway =

Former British train operating company

- British Rail Class 43 at Harringay railway station in 2007

Overview
- Franchises: InterCity East Coast; 28 April 1996 – 8 December 2007
- Main regions: London; East of England; East Midlands; Yorkshire; North East England; Scotland
- Fleet: 11 InterCity 125 HST sets; 31 InterCity 225 sets
- Stations called at: 53
- Stations operated: 12
- Parent company: Sea Containers
- Reporting mark: GR
- Predecessor: InterCity
- Successor: National Express East Coast

Other
- Website: gner.co.uk

Great North Eastern Railway, often referred to as GNER, was a British train operating company, owned by Sea Containers, that operated the InterCity East Coast franchise on the East Coast Main Line between London, Yorkshire, North East England and Scotland from April 1996 until December 2007.

During March 1996, Sea Containers was awarded the franchise to operate the East Coast services; it began operations on 28 April 1996. Initially receiving a favourable reception, the company brought in several service alterations and innovations, including the leasing of Class 373 Regional Eurostars along with the refurbishment of the InterCity 225 fleet. However, GNER's reputation and passenger numbers were both hit by a pair of derailments during the early 2000s, the Hatfield rail crash and the Great Heck rail crash. Plans to procure a fleet of tilting trains based on the Pendolino were mooted by the company, but were discarded amid a protracted and complex refranchising process.

During March 2005, the Strategic Rail Authority awarded the East Coast franchise to GNER for a second time; however, the terms for this second franchise period were financially demanding, seeing the withdrawal of subsidies and enactment of charges to the British Government. Concerns over the viability of such payments, as well as the general financial condition of Sea Containers were well-founded, with the latter entering bankruptcy in November 2006. Following its inability to fulfil agreed payments, GNER was stripped of the franchise during December 2006, although it continued to run services on the route for another year via a management contract. The final northbound GNER train was the 20:30 London King's Cross – Newcastle on 8 December 2007; the company was replaced by the new franchisee National Express East Coast one day later.

== History ==
=== Background and early years ===
The creation of the Great North Eastern Railway (GNER) is closely associated with the privatisation of British Rail that was enacted during the mid 1990s; as a result of new government policies, railway operations were to be operated by various private sector companies working under a franchise arrangement. Accordingly, the InterCity East Coast franchise was one such franchise created to take over operations of the East Coast Main Line (ECML) from British Rail. According to industry periodical Rail, the East Coast franchise was commonly viewed as one of the better franchises to bid for, as the ECML had been electrified only a few years before hand and was being served by the newest intercity stock in British Rail's inventory, the InterCity 225; the line also had a well-established reputation for its high-speed services.

Accordingly, numerous private companies submitted bids to the Office for Passenger Rail Franchising. One such firm was the Bermuda-based transport and container leasing company Sea Containers, whose bid was announced as the winner during March 1996, leading to a seven-year franchise upon the East Coast being awarded to their newly created subsidiary GNER. The initials GNER were reminiscent of the historic London and North Eastern Railway (LNER, no relation to the current train operating company), the company that operated the route before being nationalised as part of British Railways in 1948. Additionally, the name combined the initials of two of the LNER's predecessor companies, the Great Northern Railway (GNR), who had built King's Cross station, and the Great Eastern Railway (GER). GNER made further links to the past companies by adopting a dark-blue livery with red trimming lines for its trains, similar to that used by the GER, and using a Victorian coat of arms-style crest on their trains.

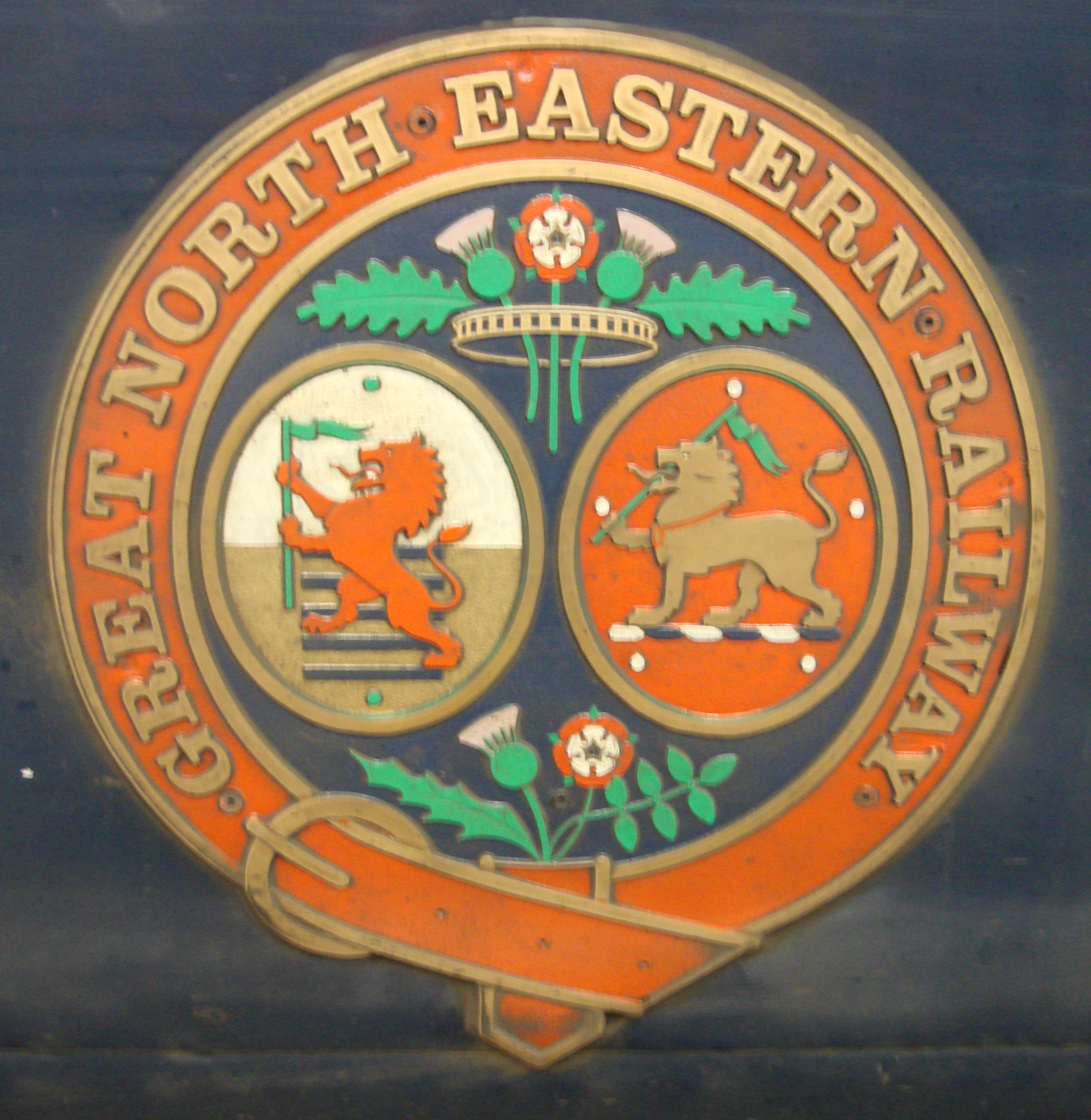
GNER's crest

The company's image was professionally designed by Vignelli Associates, an Italian design house; it was responsible for the train liveries and interiors, staff uniforms and overall corporate identity. Their website states "The Great North Eastern Railway logo emphasises the NE. The train has a new livery, dark blue with a bright red stripe containing all necessary information. It has a crest, a required tradition, and sober interiors for both first and tourist class."

Operations commenced on 28 April 1996. From its onset, GNER's management had pledged to bring about substantial changes and improvements upon the ECML. Amongst its franchise promises was that the train mileage operated in the 1995/1996 period would be initially maintained for period of two years, along with a stated ambition to increase it in the long term; furthermore, all existing rolling stock would undergo refurbishment, and that all trains would feature an onboard buffet and trolley service. The stations of the route were also to receive improvement packages; these were typically focused on improving access and security alike, while neighbouring car parks were also expanded wherever reasonable to do so.

During January 1997, Sea Containers Chairman James Sherwood announced that GNER intended to procure a pair of two new-build tilting trains; these were claimed to enable the London-Edinburgh journey to be reduced to only 3 hours and 30 minutes, in part achieved via their increased maximum speed of 140mph (225kmh). While GNER's Chief Executive Christopher Garnett stated that he expected the delivery of these new trains within two years, an order having been reportedly placed during October 1997, no such tilting trains were ever introduced appear. The original fleet would be supplemented by additional rolling stock to bolster capacity; such stock included the one-off Class 89 locomotive and a number of Class 373 Regional Eurostars.

Within its first few years of operation, GNER had succeeded at increasing the speed of the fastest scheduled service in Great Britain, the London-York route having a reported average speed of 112mph at its fastest. According to Rail magazine, the operator's customer service was frequently praised, while passengers also warmed received its promises of an increased quality of onboard catering. During May 2000, the leased Regional Eurostar fleet was properly introduced to GNER service, facilitating the inclusion of additional London to York services in a new timetable; however, unlike the Intercity 225, the Eurostars were restricted to a maximum speed of 110mph to reduce excessive wear on the overhead wiring.

=== Into the new century ===
GNER's operations were greatly affected by a pair of accidents during the early 2000s. On 17 October 2000, the Hatfield crash occurred with the high speed derailment of an Intercity 225 set, which was primarily caused by the failure of a rail that had been poorly maintained. The incident had deeply affected GNER’s business, not only due to a significant drop in confidence amongst its passengers but the rapid enactment of many emergency speed restrictions imposed by the national infrastructure company Railtrack. The incident was compounded, just as business seemed to recovering, when another serious accident involving GNER occurred on 28 February 2001. The Selby rail crash involved a Newcastle–London service that had derailed after striking a Land Rover that had driven off the M62 motorway; the GNER train was shortly after hit by a Freightliner train, compounding the incident and death toll alike. Although GNER was blameless in both incidents, the travelling public were shaken; by March 2001, the revenue of long-distance operators had declined by an average of 21 per cent.

By this point, the future franchising arrangements of the East Coast route were already being examined. During March 2000, the Shadow Strategic Rail Authority announced that two companies, Sea Containers and Virgin Rail Group, had been shortlisted to bid for the next franchise. GNER's submission had included its plan to purchase a fleet of 25 tilting trains, similar to the British Rail Class 390 Pendolinos then being introduced on the West Coast Main Line; this were envisioned to feature multiple types of propulsion, being divided between electric and diesel-powered examples so that they could serve all of the franchise's destinations. In part due to the complexity of the evaluation process and issues with the tender itself, the selection process ground to a halt.

However, in January 2002, the Strategic Rail Authority announced that the refranchising process had been scrapped and that a two-year extension had been awarded to Sea Containers, extending GNER's franchise period to April 2005. During October 2004, the Strategic Rail Authority issued the Invitation to Tender for the InterCity East Coast franchise to the four shortlisted bidders, Danish State Railways/English Welsh & Scottish, First, GNER and Virgin Rail Group. The bidding process was described as being highly competitive, several of the bidders were reportedly determined to dislodge the incumbent GNER.

In March 2005, the Strategic Rail Authority awarded the franchise to GNER for seven years, with a three-year extension based on targets being met, starting on 1 May 2005. The terms of the new franchise had considerable differences from that of the original period; instead of GNER receiving subsidies for its operations, it would be instead paying the British state for the privilege of doing so; there was reportedly concerns over the financial viability of such an arrangement from the onset. In order to meet these payments, GNER assumed passenger numbers would increase by around 30 per cent across the life of the franchise, reaching around 20 million by 2015.

=== Rising competition and financial issues ===
In May 2006, it was revealed that GNER's parent company Sea Containers was in financial difficulties, and was rumoured to be bordering on insolvency. Questions were raised as to whether GNER could continue operating should its parent company cease trading. The company rejected this assertion, stating that its lines of credit and financial activities were "ring-fenced" away from Sea Containers, and therefore a cessation of services for this reason was impossible. It did not however stop speculation from rival TOCs (principally First) and Virgin Rail Group that they would be keen to rebid for the ECML franchise if it were put back out to tender. In July 2006, rumours began circulating that Sea Containers would be prepared to sell GNER in an effort to stave off resorting to Chapter 11 proceedings to secure itself from its creditors.

During July 2006, the High Court rejected GNER's judicial review over the Office of Rail Regulation's decision to allow rival train operating company Grand Central to operate trains along part of the ECML, – and in particular its right to call at York, one of the principal (and lucrative) stops on the ECML. GNER had made its application partly on the basis that 'open-access' train operators are not required to meet the same fixed costs for accessing Network Rail's infrastructure as train operating companies running services under a contract or 'franchise' with the Department for Transport. GNER's case failed principally because the High Court determined that not only did European law permit the Rail Regulator to establish a charging regime for open-access operators which was different from the one which applies to franchised operators (such as GNER), in this case not imposing a fixed charge on open-access operators, but that if he had not done so, he would have been acting illegally because of the very different conditions under which open-access operators and franchised operators get access to the network. The High Court (Mr Justice Sullivan) refused GNER permission to appeal.

That same month, GNER announced that its chief executive officer, Christopher Garnett, was to step down, having occupied that position since Sea Containers had originally been awarded their first franchise. Amid growing industry speculation that Sea Containers was working towards a "financial restructuring", the company's President and Chief Executive Bob Mackenzie was named as Garnett's successor. The firm's problems were further fuelled by GNER's poor profitability, which had been linked to the company's overbidding for the franchise coupled to what proved to be crippling premium repayments to the government. The company blamed the effects of the 7/7 terrorist attacks, increased electricity prices, and increased competition from low-cost airlines for the decline in passenger numbers. It also faced a growing challenge from the revitalised West Coast services operated by Virgin Trains. The company attempted to address the problem by waiving booking fees on internet sales, cutting staff numbers, and raising fares and car-parking charges where the market could bear it. In a press interview in September 2006, GNER's ex-chief Christopher Garnett hinted at a bleak future for GNER and the franchising system, claiming that the trend among TOCs to overbid for the renewal of franchises would result in a financially unsustainable railway.

In October 2006, Sea Containers filed for bankruptcy protection under the US Chapter 11 process, therefore allowing the company to continue trading while it sorted out its finances. However, this meant that the company was unable to fulfil its guarantees in respect to its GNER subsidiary, greatly increasing the risk exposure of the latter's operations.

=== Demise and transfer ===
During December 2006, the Department for Transport announced its intention to strip Sea Containers of its franchise; this was reportedly due to the company's financial issues and having been overbid. Despite this announcement, GNER continued to operate the franchise under a management contract, which was extendable for up to two years, while the Department for Transport undertook the selection of a new franchisee.

In February 2007, the Department for Transport announced that Arriva, FirstGroup, National Express and Virgin Rail Group had been shortlisted to lodge bids for the franchise. In April 2007, it was announced that GNER had a 10% stake in the bid lodged by Stagecoach & Virgin. In August 2007, the Department for Transport awarded the franchise to National Express, and GNER's services transferred to National Express East Coast on 9 December 2007.

== Services ==
GNER's principal routes were from London King's Cross to Leeds and Edinburgh Waverley.

From Edinburgh Waverley, selected services continued on to Motherwell and Glasgow Central, Inverness, or Aberdeen. From Leeds, some trains ran to and from Bradford Forster Square, Skipton, and Harrogate.

One service per day also ran to and from Hull via Selby. Other towns and cities served by GNER trains included Stevenage, Peterborough, Grantham, Newark, Retford, Doncaster, Wakefield, Shipley, Keighley, Horsforth, Brough, York, Northallerton, Darlington, Durham, Newcastle, Morpeth, Alnmouth (for Alnwick), Berwick-upon-Tweed, Dunbar, Motherwell, Inverkeithing, Kirkcaldy, Leuchars, Arbroath, Montrose, Stonehaven, Falkirk, Stirling, Perth, Pitlochry, Kingussie, and Aviemore.

=== Principal routes ===
==== London-Leeds ====
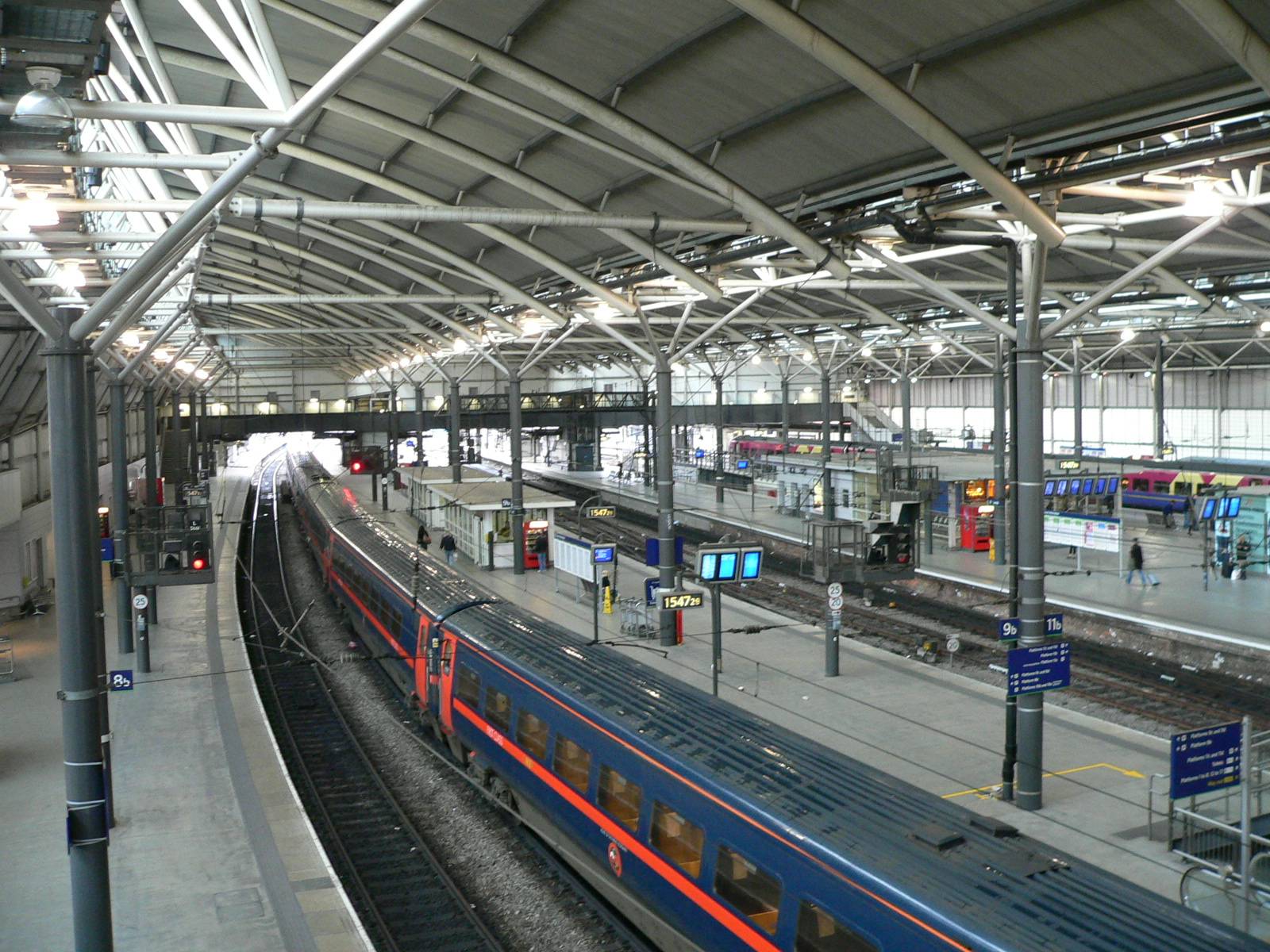
InterCity 225 set at Leeds

The service between King's Cross and Leeds was generally hourly, with trains serving most main intermediate stations. With the completion of the Allington Chord, near Grantham, having increased track capacity, GNER began to operate a full half-hourly service throughout the day on this route in May 2007.

==== London-Newcastle-Edinburgh ====
A half-hourly service between King's Cross and Newcastle operated for most of the day, departing from London on the hour and the half-hour. The 'top of the hour' departures continued through to Edinburgh (with the 10:00 keeping the traditional name Flying Scotsman); some of these ran on to either Glasgow Central, Aberdeen or Inverness. These trains generally ran as limited-stop expresses between London and Newcastle: all trains called at York, and most at Peterborough and Darlington, though afternoon and evening departures from King's Cross ran non-stop to Doncaster or York. The trains leaving King's Cross on the half-hour generally terminated at Newcastle and served other intermediate stations such as Grantham, Newark, Retford, Doncaster and Durham as well as Peterborough, York, and Darlington.

==== London-Glasgow ====
GNER operated ten trains per day between King's Cross and Glasgow. With the upgrade of the West Coast Main Line (WCML) between London Euston and Glasgow to 125 mph completed, GNER could no longer compete with Virgin Trains on this route in terms of journey times (5hrs 30mins compared to the new 4hrs 25min time on the WCML), but they did provide a link from Glasgow to Newcastle and York and a secondary route for use when the WCML was closed for engineering work.

=== Minor routes ===
==== London/Leeds-Aberdeen ====
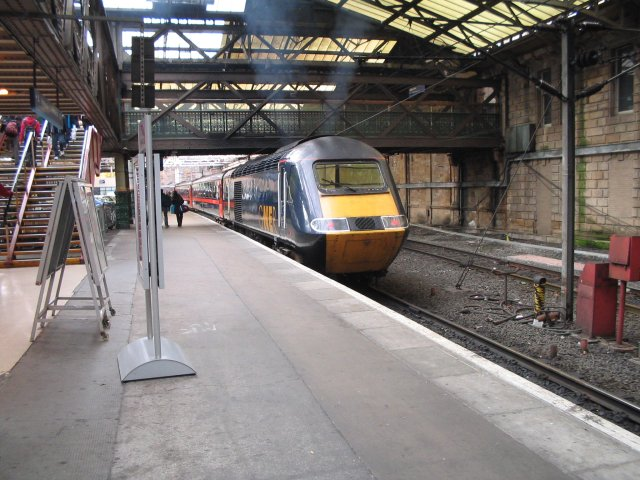
Class 43 43116 at Edinburgh Waverley, with a service from Aberdeen to Leeds. These trains were used on routes where the line was not fully electrified, and on the route from London King's Cross to Skipton.

There were three trains per day each way between King's Cross and Aberdeen, the journey time being just over seven hours. There was also one service per day arriving at Aberdeen from Leeds. These services were operated using a diesel InterCity 125 because the Edinburgh to Aberdeen line and the section of the Cross Country Route between Leeds and York are not electrified.

==== London-Inverness ====
A daily service operated between King's Cross and Inverness, named the Highland Chieftain, a journey taking just over 8 hours. The service was operated using a diesel InterCity 125, as the line north of Edinburgh is not electrified.

==== London-Hull ====
GNER ran the Hull Executive from Hull Paragon to London King's Cross, with one morning journey down to London and one evening journey up to Hull. The service was operated by a diesel InterCity 125, as the line to Hull is not electrified. More regular services between London King's Cross and Hull Paragon were operated by Hull Trains.

==== London-Bradford ====
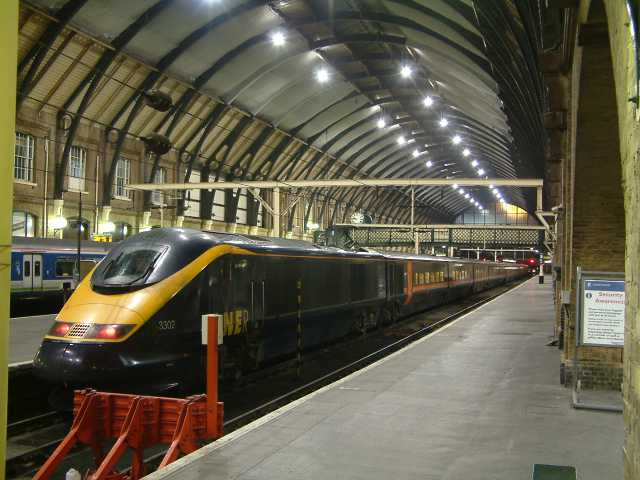
Until December 2005, GNER's White Rose service was operated by Class 373 Regional Eurostar sets, one of which is seen here at London King's Cross

There were two trains per day between London and Bradford Forster Square. These were extensions of the King's Cross–Leeds services and were operated using an electric InterCity 225. Some of these services were also operated using a Class 89 electric locomotive, Mark 4 coaches and a DVT until 2001.

==== London-Skipton ====
There was a morning train from Skipton and Keighley to King's Cross with an early evening return. As with the Bradford trains, this was an extension to the Leeds–London service. Though the line to Skipton is electrified throughout, the GNER service to/from the town operated using a diesel InterCity 125 because the electrical infrastructure on the Leeds-to-Skipton line at the time was unable to provide sufficient power to support an InterCity 225 alongside the existing electric local services.

==== London-Harrogate ====
There was a Monday-Saturday morning departure from Harrogate to King's Cross. However, there was no return journey so passengers were required to change at Leeds or York on to Northern Rail services to Harrogate. This service was operated using a diesel InterCity 125 as the line to Harrogate is not electrified.

The Saturday running of this service was the week's only GNER southbound service from Leeds not to call at Wakefield Westgate. This service departed from Leeds and took the Selby line to join the East Coast Main Line at Hambleton.

== Rolling stock ==
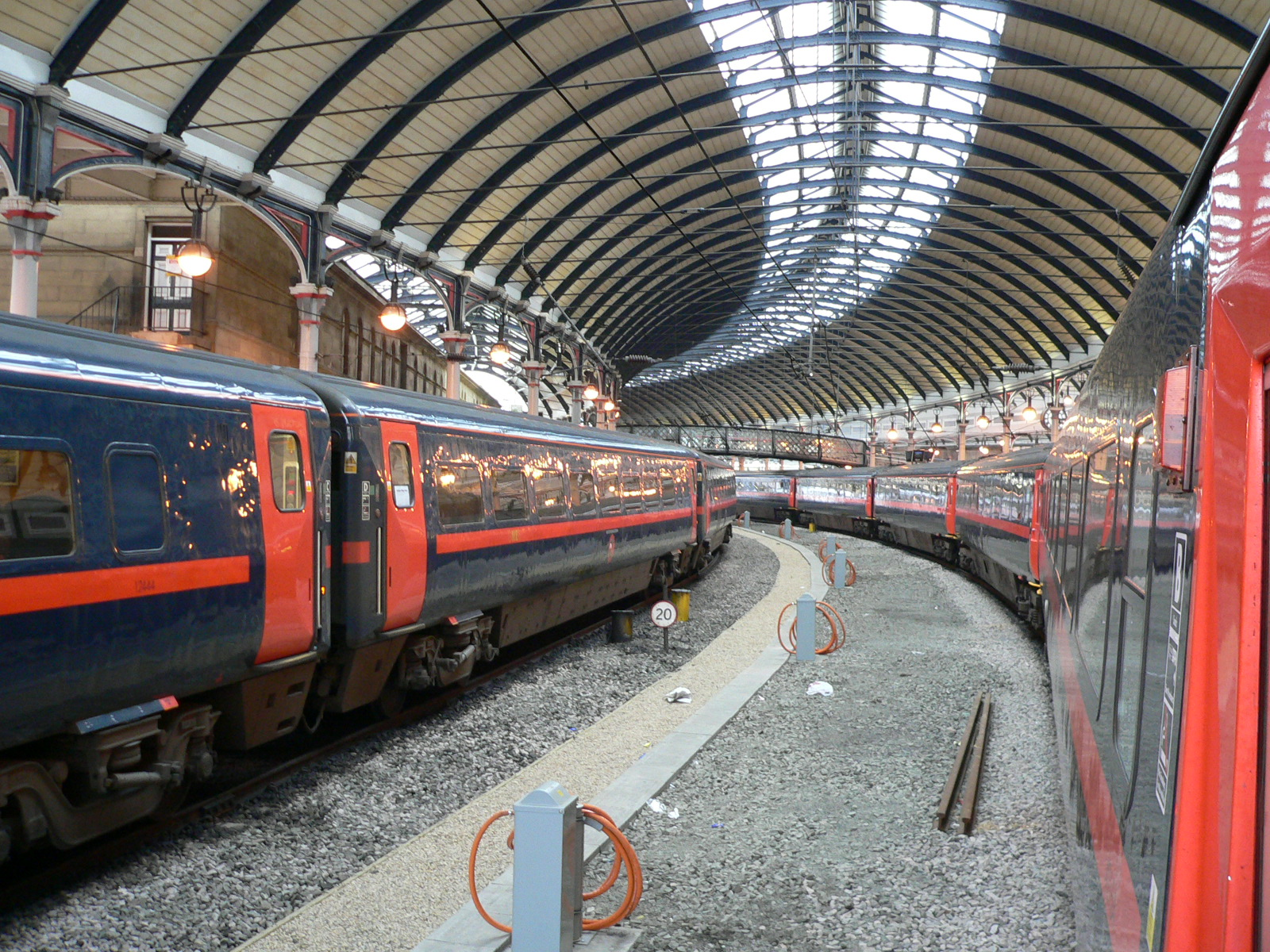
GNER InterCity 225 (on the left) and InterCity 125 HST meeting at Newcastle.

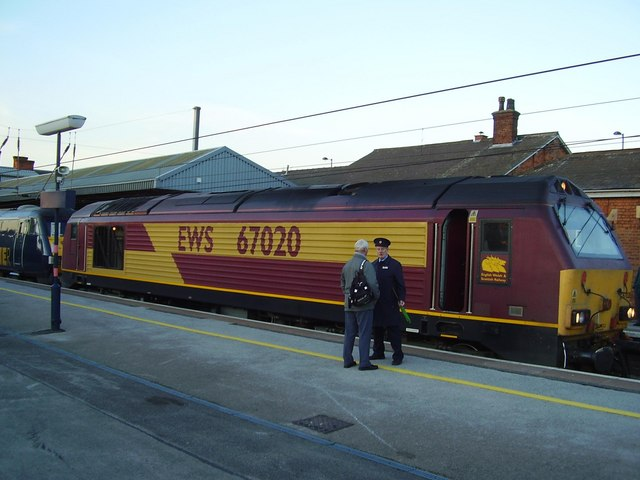
EWS 67020 hauling a failed GNER InterCity 225 at Grantham in 2007.

At the beginning of operations in April 1996, GNER inherited a fleet of InterCity 125 High Speed Train sets made up of Class 43 power cars and Mark 3 carriages, and InterCity 225 sets made up of Class 91 locomotives and Mark 4 carriages and Driving Van Trailers. It continued to operate both types throughout its time operating the franchise.

One early, and particularly low cost, means of expanding GNER's fleet was the purchase of the Class 89 prototype electric locomotive 89001. After being repaired at a reported cost of £100,000 and repainted in GNER livery, it went into revenue-earning service in March 1997, being primarily used on services from London King's Cross to Leeds and Bradford Forster Square. 89001 had to be withdrawn from service in October 2000 due to technical problems, but its brief service life had helped alleviate GNER's shortage of traction due to reliability issues.

By 2000, it was clear that GNER's Class 91 fleet was in need of refurbishment to address reliability issues, thus the company made arrangements to lease alternative traction as a stop-gap measure. Between May 2000 and December 2005, GNER leased a number of Class 373 Regional Eurostars from Eurostar. In GNER service, the fleet was operated for services between London and York, and later Leeds, but had to be restricted to a maximum speed of 110 mph (180 km/h) between Grantham and Doncaster because of problems with the overhead wire and pantograph interface. Furthermore, as a consequence of gauging restrictions, the Eurostars were not permitted to operate north of York to Newcastle, Glasgow or Edinburgh. During November 2005, it was announced that, following their refurbishment, the InterCity 225 fleet would displace the Eurostars.

The InterCity 225s were refurbished by Bombardier Transportation between 2003–2005, the programme was named Project Mallard in honour of the LNER steam locomotive. They boasted re-designed interiors and new features such as Wi-Fi and electric sockets at every seat pair.

GNER bought twelve Mark 3 sleeping carriages with the intention of converting them to passenger carriages to lengthen HSTs. However, this programme was cancelled when GNER was able to lease other Mark 3s that were released by Virgin CrossCountry after this operator withdrew its HSTs. One commitment for the new franchise awarded in 2005 was to upgrade all of its HSTs to the same standards as the InterCity 225s. The Class 43 power cars were overhauled by Brush Traction in Loughborough, their Paxman Valenta engines replaced with MTU 16V4000 units. To operate increased services to Leeds, GNER leased two former Midland Mainline HSTs from May 2007.

English, Welsh & Scottish Railway provided strategically placed rescue locomotives, originally Class 47s and later Class 67s. EWS also provided Class 90s to cover for Class 91s; one was repainted in GNER livery but not dedicated to the franchise.

The HSTs were allocated to Craigentinny Depot in Edinburgh and the InterCity 225s to Bounds Green Depot in London. Lighter maintenance and servicing were carried out at Neville Hill Depot in Leeds and Heaton Depot in Newcastle.

During the late 1990s, GNER announced plans to purchase a pair of two tilting trains, based on Italian Pendolino technology. This ambition was expanded in the early 2000s when, as part of a refranchising bid, GNER stated that its planned to purchase a fleet of 25 tilting trains, similar to the British Rail Class 390 Pendolinos then being introduced on the West Coast Main Line; this were envisioned to feature multiple types of propulsion, being divided between electric and diesel-powered examples so that they could serve all of the franchise's destinations. However, the tender and bid alike were abandoned, and no such trains were ever introduced.

Fleet at end of franchise
Class	Image	Type	Top speed		Number	Routes operated	Built
Class	Image	Type	mph	km/h	Number	Routes operated	Built
InterCity 125 trains (HSTs)
Class 43		Diesel locomotive	125	200	14	London King's Cross to Aberdeen, Inverness, Hull Paragon, Harrogate and Skipton, and Leeds to Aberdeen	1976–1982
Mark 3 carriage		Passenger carriage	125	200	56	London King's Cross to Aberdeen, Inverness, Hull Paragon, Harrogate and Skipton, and Leeds to Aberdeen	1975–1988
InterCity 225 trains
Class 91		Electric locomotive	140	225	31	London King's Cross to Leeds, Edinburgh Waverley, Bradford Forster Square, Newcastle and Glasgow Central	1988–1991
Mark 4 carriage		Passenger carriage	140	225	302	London King's Cross to Leeds, Edinburgh Waverley, Bradford Forster Square, Newcastle and Glasgow Central	1989–1992
Driving Van Trailer		Control car	140	225	31	London King's Cross to Leeds, Edinburgh Waverley, Bradford Forster Square, Newcastle and Glasgow Central	1988
Hired locomotives
Class 90		Electric locomotive	110	180	1	Thunderbird locomotive	1987–1990

Past fleet
Class	Image	Type	Top speed		Number	Routes operated	Built	Withdrawn
Class	Image	Type	mph	km/h	Number	Routes operated	Built	Withdrawn
Class 89		Electric locomotive	125	200	1	London King's Cross to Leeds and Bradford Forster Square	1986	2000
Class 373/2 Regional Eurostar		Electric multiple unit	186	300	5	London King's Cross to York and Leeds	1992–1996	2005

== See also ==
- East Coast Main Line
- National Express East Coast
- East Coast
- Virgin Trains East Coast
- London North Eastern Railway
- National Rail

Preceded by InterCity; As part of British Rail	Operator of InterCity East Coast franchise 1996–2007	Succeeded by National Express East Coast
