= InterCity East Coast =

Railway franchise in Great Britain

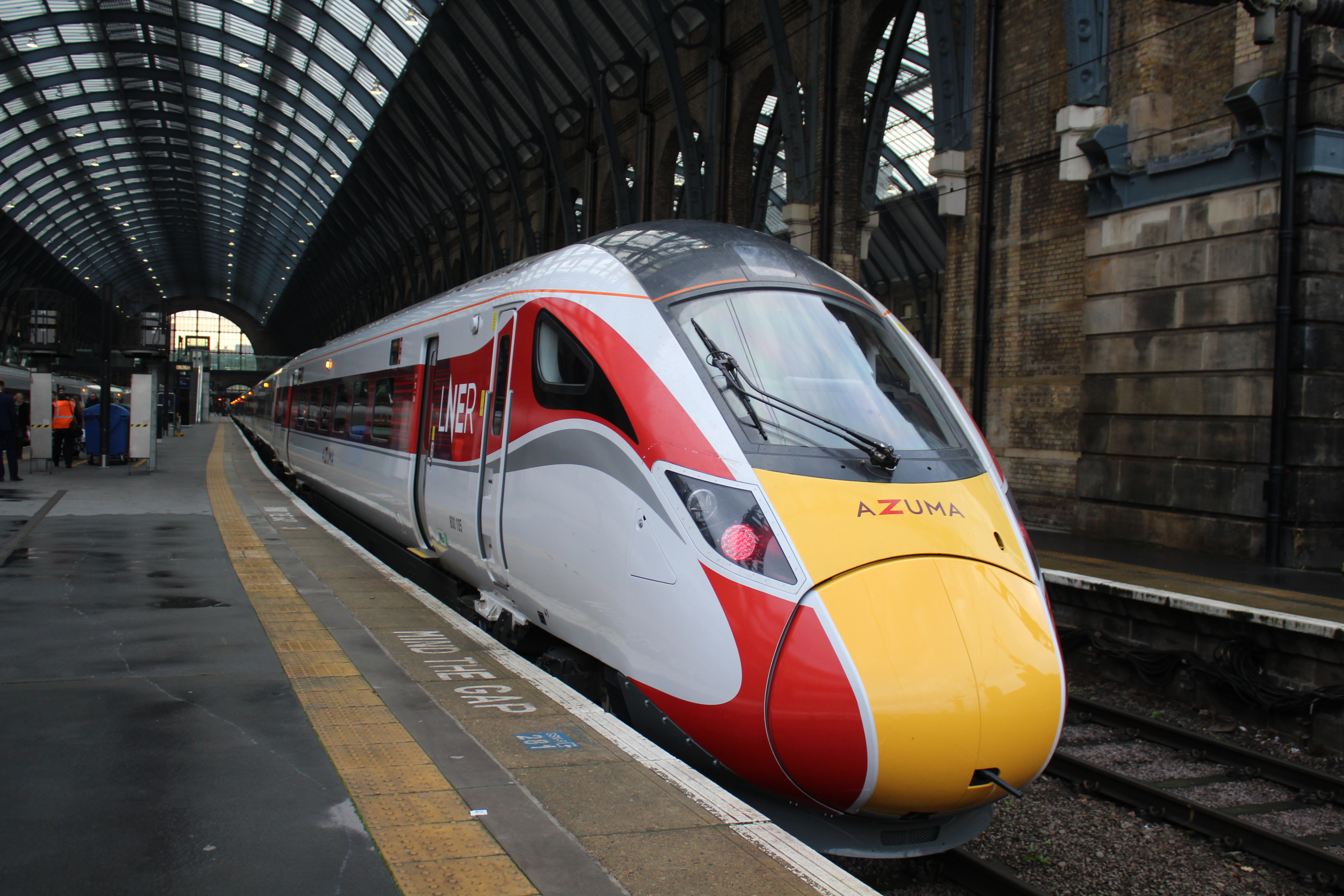
- An LNER Azuma at London King's Cross (2019)
- Operator: London North Eastern Railway
- Main Route: East Coast Main Line
- Fleet: 7 InterCity 225 sets, 23 Class 800 Azuma sets, 42 Class 801 Azuma sets
- Stations called at: 53
- Dates of operation: 28 Apr 1996 – 8 Dec 2007, 9 Dec 2007 – 13 Nov 2009, 14 Nov 2009 – 28 Feb 2015, 1 Mar 2015 – 23 Jun 2018, 24 Jun 2018 – onwards

Technical
- Track gauge: 1,435 mm (4 ft 8 1/2 in)
- Length: 393 miles (632 km)
- Operating speed: 125 mph

Other
- Website: www.gov.uk/government/collections/rail-franchising#intercity-east-coast-franchise

InterCity East Coast is a railway franchise for passenger trains on the East Coast Main Line in Great Britain. It connects London King's Cross with Hull Paragon, Lincoln, Leeds, Bradford Forster Square, Harrogate, Newcastle, Edinburgh Waverley, Inverness and Aberdeen. It was formed during the privatisation of British Rail and transferred to the private sector in April 1996.

Initially operated by Great North Eastern Railway (GNER), it was later operated by National Express East Coast, East Coast and Virgin Trains East Coast. In June 2018, the franchise was terminated, with the operation of stations and trains taken back into public ownership; since then, services have been provided by London North Eastern Railway (LNER), a company owned by the Department for Transport.

== History ==
=== Great North Eastern Railway ===
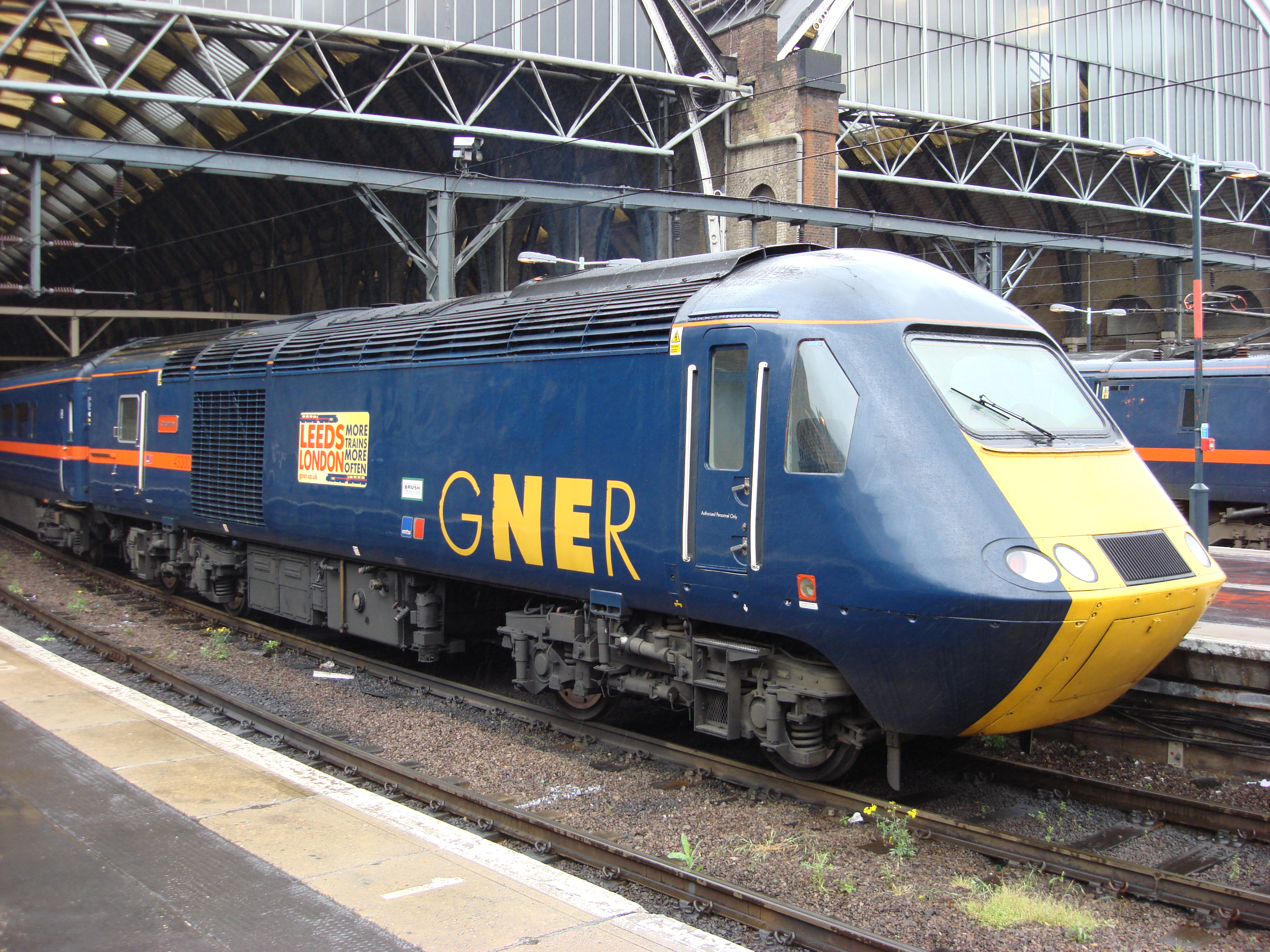
A GNER InterCity 125 at London King's Cross (May 2007)

In April 1996, Sea Containers commenced a seven-year contract to operate the franchise, operating under the GNER brand.

In March 2000, the Shadow Strategic Rail Authority (SRA) shortlisted Sea Containers and Virgin Rail Group to bid for the next franchise. The franchise was to be for 20 years and included proposals for new trains and replacements of sections of track. In January 2002, the SRA scrapped the refranchising process and awarded a two-year extension to Sea Containers until April 2005.

In October 2004, the SRA issued an Invitation to Tender for the next franchise to the four shortlisted bidders: Danish State Railways/English Welsh & Scottish, FirstGroup, GNER and Virgin Rail Group. In March 2005, the franchise was awarded to GNER for seven years, with a three-year extension based on targets being met, starting on 1 May 2005. GNER committed to pay a £1.3 billion premium to the Department for Transport (DfT) over ten years.

However, due to the financial problems caused by it having overbid as well as financial difficulties encountered by the parent company, the government announced on December 2006 that it was stripping the franchise from Sea Containers; it would put it up for retender, with GNER running the franchise on fixed-fee management contract in the interim.

=== National Express East Coast ===
In February 2007, the DfT announced Arriva, FirstGroup, National Express and Virgin Rail Group had been shortlisted to lodge bids for the franchise. In April 2007, it was announced that GNER had a 10% stake in the Virgin Rail Group bid. In August 2007 the franchise was awarded to National Express, and GNER's services transferred to National Express East Coast (NXEC) on 9 December 2007.

By 2009, NXEC was under increasing financial pressure due to rising fuel prices and the economic downturn. Instead of projected increases in revenue from the franchise, in the first half of 2009 NXEC ticket sales income decreased by 1%. In April 2009, National Express confirmed that it was still pursuing talks with the government over possible financial assistance with the franchise, either through a reduction in the premium due or other assistance.

In July 2009, National Express announced it planned to default on the franchise, having failed to renegotiate the contractual terms of operation, and would not provide any further funding. This meant NXEC would run out of cash by the end of 2009. As a result, the DfT announced it would renationalise the franchise.

=== East Coast ===
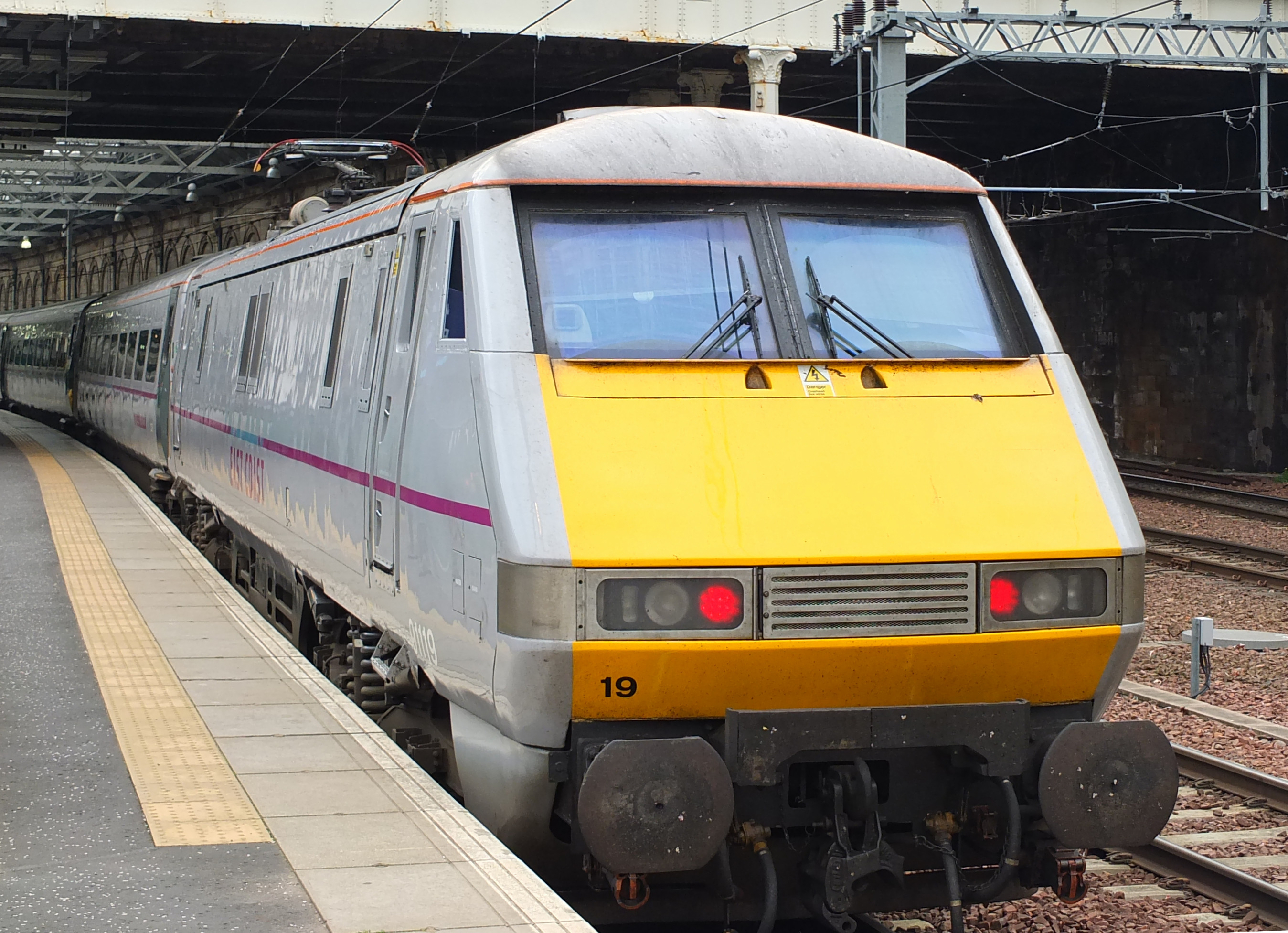
An East Coast InterCity 225 at Edinburgh Waverley (June 2014)

The franchise was renationalised on 14 November 2009, with Directly Operated Railways' subsidiary East Coast taking over, with the intention being that operations would return to a private franchisee by December 2013. In March 2013, the Secretary of State for Transport announced that this would be put back to February 2015.

=== Virgin Trains East Coast ===
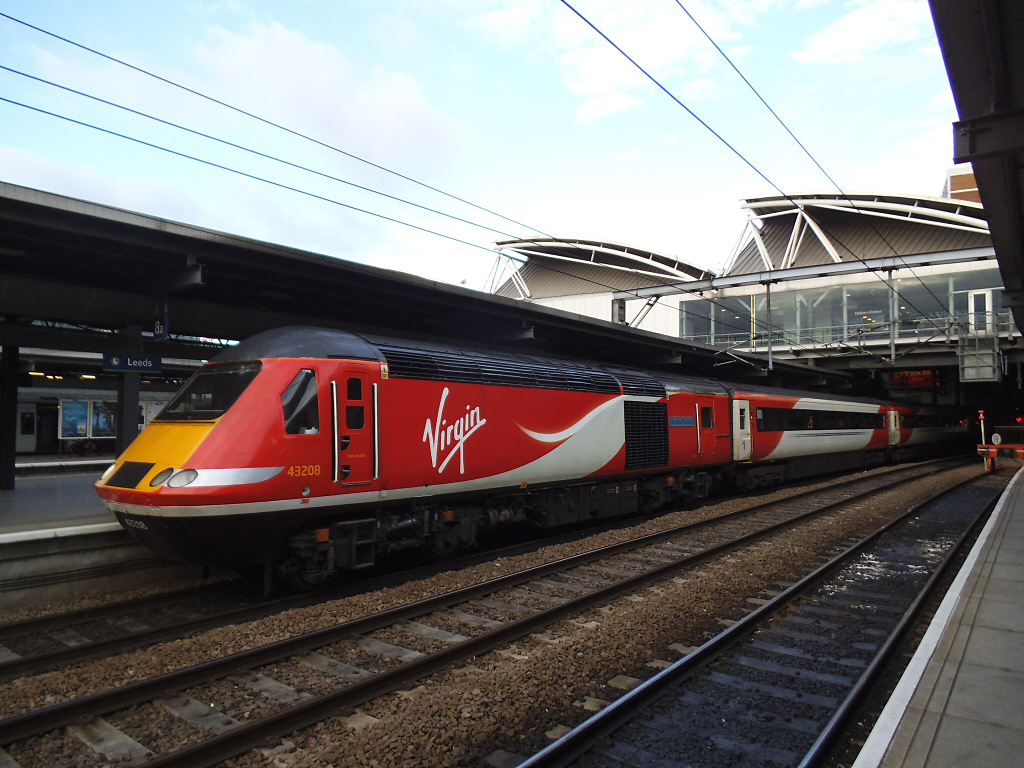
An InterCity 125 seen at Leeds station

In January 2014, FirstGroup, Keolis/Eurostar International Limited (EIL) and Stagecoach/Virgin were announced as the shortlisted bidders for the new franchise. In November 2014, the franchise was awarded to Stagecoach/Virgin, who – trading as Virgin Trains East Coast (VTEC) – commenced operating the franchise on 1 March 2015.

In November 2017, Secretary of State for Transport, Chris Grayling, announced the early termination of the East Coast franchise in 2020, three years ahead of schedule, following losses on the route by the operator. VTEC had been due to pay more than £2 billion in franchise premiums to the government over the last four years of its contract.

Grayling said the losses were due to VTEC overestimating future growth in passenger revenue in its bid calculations, meaning franchise payments due to the government exceeded the profits being returned by running the services. Others pointed to the delays in state-owned Network Rail's delivery of expected infrastructure upgrades, which meant the company could not operate the increased number of services needed to generate the greater revenue.

Termination was brought forward in February 2018 to June 2018.

=== London North Eastern Railway ===
On 16 May 2018, Grayling announced the franchise would be terminated on 24 June 2018 and renationalised. A partnership of Arup Group, Ernst & Young and SNC-Lavalin Rail & Transit provided assistance to the government in their preparation to take control of the franchise from VTEC. Services are operated by LNER, which is owned by DfT Operator, a wholly-owned subsidiary of the Department for Transport.

== Rolling stock ==
At its inception, the franchise inherited and operated a fleet of InterCity 125 and InterCity 225 trains. These were refurbished with new interiors in the mid-2000s; the former were retired in December 2019 and the latter were due to be retired in 2020. The fleet was to be replaced fully by Classes 800 and 801 Azumas.

In February 2020, it was announced that LNER would retain several Class 91s and Mark 4 sets, to enable it to meet December 2021 timetable requirements.
