= Virgin Rail Group =

British rail franchise operator

- Type: Limited company
- Industry: Transport
- Founded: 1997
- Founder: Richard Branson
- Headquarters: London, England
- Area served: United Kingdom
- Owner: Virgin Group (51%); Stagecoach (49%)
- Subsidiaries: Virgin CrossCountry (1997–2007); Virgin Trains West Coast (1997–2019)
- Website: www.virgintrains.co.uk

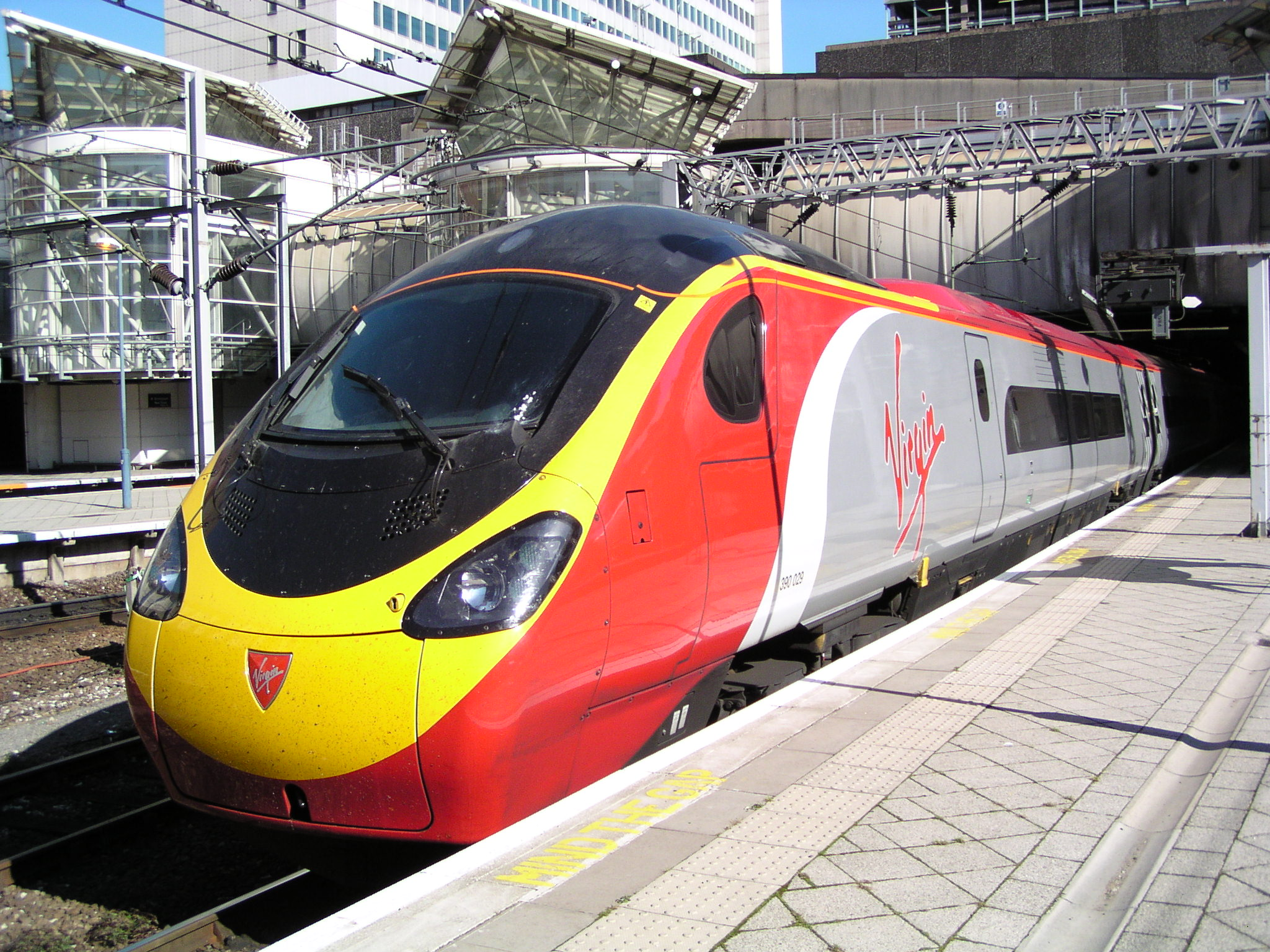
Virgin Trains West Coast Pendolino at Birmingham New Street in September 2003

WCT Group Limited, until 2021 under the name Virgin Rail Group Limited, is a British rail transport company that was formed in 1996 by the Virgin Group to bid for rail franchises in the United Kingdom during the privatisation of British Rail.

== United Kingdom operations ==
=== 1990s ===
Amid the privatisation of British Rail during the mid 1990s, Virgin submitted multiple bids to operate several different train franchises, including Gatwick Express, InterCity CrossCountry and InterCity West Coast. It was successful in winning the latter two, leading to Virgin CrossCountry and Virgin West Coast commencing operations in January and March 1997 respectively. Both franchises were scheduled to run for 15 years.

One of Virgin's franchise commitments was to replace the British Rail-era locomotives and rolling stock inherited by Virgin West Coast with brand new tilting trains. Following negotiations with several manufacturers, Virgin placed an order with Alstom/Fiat Ferroviaria to produce the envisioned tilting train, which was known by the name Pendolino and was later designated under TOPS as the Class 390. It was expected that the Pendolinos would run at service speeds of up to 140 mph (225 km/h) and that the whole fleet would be delivered by May 2002. The service introduction of the Pendolino was repeatedly delayed, a fact which has been attributed to the poor project management and the collapse of infrastructure owner Railtrack.

In order for tilting trains to be operated, Railtrack had committed itself to upgrading the West Coast Main Line as to permit 140 mph operation by 2005. However, the modernisation of the line suffered from spiralling costs, rising from an estimated £2 billion to roughly £10 billion, while the programme had failures that were technical as well as managerial, such as the moving block signalling apparatus being immature for such a busy mixed-traffic mainline. Railtrack would ultimately collapse while its successor, Network Rail, would also be unable to fully deliver the promised upgrade, heavily impacting Virgin West Coast's operations. The upgrade programme would be cut back, as a result, the top speed was reduced to 125 mph. The Pendolino fleet was introduced into passenger services from Birmingham International to Manchester Piccadilly on 23 July 2002, coinciding with the opening of the 2002 Commonwealth Games in Manchester.

In October 1998, Virgin Group sold 49% of the shares in Virgin Rail Group to the British transport company Stagecoach.

=== 2000s ===
In March 2000, Virgin was shortlisted to bid for the InterCity East Coast franchise. During January 2002, the Strategic Rail Authority scrapped the refranchising process and awarded a two-year extension to GNER.

In the wake of the collapse of Railtrack and the inability of Network Rail to deliver on the 140 mph (225 km/h) West Coast Main Line upgrade, both the Virgin CrossCountry and Virgin West Coast franchises were suspended in favour of management contracts in July 2002. While the terms of the West Coast franchise were renegotiated, agreement could not be reached on CrossCountry and it was retendered in 2007. While Virgin Trains did bid to retain the franchise, it was awarded to Arriva, thus the services operated by Virgin CrossCountry were transferred to CrossCountry on 11 November 2007.

During 2004, Virgin was again shortlisted to bid for the InterCity East Coast franchise, but was ultimately unsuccessful; the franchise was instead won by Sea Containers, parent company of then train operator Great North Eastern Railway. After Sea Containers was stripped of the East Coast franchise due to poor financial management, Virgin was again shortlisted for the InterCity East Coast franchise in February 2007, submitting a bid had a 10% shareholding by the incumbent, Sea Containers. However, this bid was not successful, as the franchise was won by National Express.

During July 2008, Virgin was awarded a contract by the DfT to manage the introduction of 106 extra Class 390 Pendolino carriages. Virgin Trains made further enhancements to the Pendolino fleet, perhaps most noticeable change was the 21 nine-car units each had one first class carriage converted to standard class.

=== 2010s ===
Virgin was shortlisted for the InterCity West Coast franchise by the DfT in March 2011. In August 2012, the Department awarded FirstGroup the new franchise. Virgin felt that the methodology used to award the franchise was flawed, and Richard Branson said it was unlikely Virgin would bid for any future franchises. When the DfT did not respond to Virgin's concerns, it launched proceedings for a judicial review. While preparing its case for the judicial review, the government discovered significant technical flaws in the way the franchise process had been conducted, and cancelled the competition, vindicating Virgin's protests.

In December 2012, Virgin was awarded a 23-month management contract to run the West Coast franchise until November 2014; the contract was extended in stages until March 2020.

During May 2013, there was a controversy regarding new uniforms, with claims that the blouses were too revealing and potentially exposed dark bras to the public. Virgin Rail Group responded to this by offering a voucher worth £20 to allow employees to purchase a top to wear underneath the new blouses.

In November 2016, the government announced that the InterCity West Coast franchise would be replaced by the West Coast Partnership, which included operating High Speed 2 (HS2). Services were planned to begin on the first phase of HS2 in 2026. The DfT requires that the new operator have experience in operating high speed trains (250 mph) and infrastructure. To satisfy this requirement, Stagecoach (50%) and Virgin (20%) bid in a joint venture with SNCF (30%). In April 2019, Stagecoach revealed that it had been disqualified from the franchises it was bidding for, including the West Coast Partnership. One month later, the company announced that it would legally challenge the disqualification. However, on 17 June 2020, the High Court ruled against the company and that the decision had been lawful. Accordingly, Virgin Trains ceased in December 2019.

In June 2019, Virgin lodged an application to the Office of Rail & Road for an open access service from London Euston to Liverpool Lime Street calling at Nuneaton, Tamworth, Lichfield Trent Valley, Liverpool South Parkway and Liverpool Lime Street to rival the West Coast Partnership franchisee from May 2021. The application was later withdrawn.

== Non United Kingdom rail operations ==
In 1998, Virgin Rail, as part of the Capital Rail consortium, was shortlisted for an Australian high-speed rail service from Sydney to Canberra.

During November 2018, it was announced that Virgin Group would become a minority investor in the American company Brightline and would provide rights to rebrand the service as Virgin Trains USA. However, in August 2020, managers at the company alleged that Virgin had not provided the agreed investment money and thus it would be ending its branding deal, returning to the previous Brightline brand. In March 2021, Virgin sued Brightline for $251.3 million because of the broken contract. In October 2023, the High Court in London ruled in favour of Virgin, and awarded the company $115 million in damages. Brightline stated its intention to appeal the judgement.

== In popular culture ==
Virgin's role in the privatisation of British Rail was lampooned in Thomas the Privatised Tank Engine, a 1994 parody children's book published by Private Eye magazine. A send-up of The Railway Series by the Reverend W. Awdry, it mentions characters such as "Gordon the Virgin Engine" (Gordon the Big Engine) and "The Bearded Controller" (The Fat Controller, reimagined as Richard Branson).
