= State-owned enterprises of the United Kingdom =

United Kingdom statutory corporations

State-owned enterprises of the United Kingdom are organisations owned or controlled by the public sector that trade as market producers. In UK statistics, the Office for National Statistics (ONS) classifies market-producing entities under public control as public corporations, using control indicators and a "50% market test". Other publicly owned entities that are non-market are classified to central or local government. The statistical classification is distinct from legal form, which may be a Companies Act company, a statutory corporation or a body created by royal charter.

State ownership exists at central, devolved and local levels in the United Kingdom. Centrally owned examples include broadcasters, investment vehicles and infrastructure bodies; devolved holdings include rail, water and transport undertakings in Scotland, Wales and Northern Ireland. Channel 4 remained publicly owned following a 2023 government review and reforms.

As of October 2025, the Department for Transport’s holding group, DfT Operator Limited (DFTO), manages seven train operating companies in England under operator of last resort arrangements in the Railways Act 1993. Recent transfers saw South Western Railway (25 May 2025), c2c (20 July 2025) and Greater Anglia (12 October 2025) join London North Eastern Railway (2018), Northern Trains (2020), Southeastern (2021) and TransPennine Express (2023). DFTO replaced the former DfT OLR Holdings name in December 2024 and runs services under time-limited Service Agreements rather than franchises.

Recent changes include energy-system and nuclear-decommissioning reforms and the creation of new central investment bodies. The National Energy System Operator, a public corporation, took on system-operation functions on 1 October 2024; the Great British Energy Act 2025 established Great British Energy; the UK Infrastructure Bank was renamed National Wealth Fund Limited on 14 October 2024; and Magnox Ltd, a subsidiary of the Nuclear Decommissioning Authority, adopted the corporate name Nuclear Restoration Services in April 2024.

== Terminology and scope ==
In UK economic statistics, the Office for National Statistics (ONS) classifies units to the public sector where the public sector has control over an entity’s general policy or programme, assessed against a set of control indicators. Market-producing units under public control are classified as public corporations using a "50% market test" that compares sales with production costs. Non-market units are classified to central or local government. Statistical classification is distinct from legal form, which in the UK may be a Companies Act company, a statutory corporation or a body created by royal charter.

Administrative labels used in UK government, such as executive agencies and non-departmental public bodies, describe governance and accountability rather than sector classification. Such bodies are included here only where they also meet the statistical test for a market producer under public control. Most agencies and NDPBs are non-market and are therefore out of scope for this list.

For this article, inclusion covers four categories. First, ONS-classified public corporations. Second, central-government-owned companies and statutory or chartered corporations where ministers exercise control. Third, devolved equivalents controlled by devolved ministers. Fourth, local authority trading companies where a local or combined authority exercises control. Exclusions include public–private partnerships and joint ventures where government does not control general corporate policy, and cases where the state holds only a minority or special share without control. Such interests may be noted separately as strategic holdings.

Control does not require day-to-day intervention or majority ownership. It may arise from rights such as appointing or removing directors, vetoes over key decisions or statutory powers. Minority shareholdings or special shares do not imply control in the absence of such indicators.

== History overview ==
=== Early public corporations and municipal undertakings (to 1945) ===
Public ownership in the UK took root through chartered bodies, statutory corporations and municipal enterprises that delivered utilities and transport. Local authorities developed electricity and tram undertakings, while central government used statutory boards in sectors such as broadcasting and transport. These models combined public accountability with trading income and provided the template for later nationalisations.

=== Post-war nationalisation and sectoral consolidation (1945 to 1951) ===
The post-war government extended public ownership across banking, coal, inland transport, electricity, gas and steel. The Bank of England was nationalised in 1946 under the Bank of England Act 1946. Large statutory corporations were created to run the major utilities and transport systems with ministerial sponsorship and borrowing powers.

=== Restructuring and a mixed ownership model (1951 to 1979) ===
Later governments adjusted the scope and structures of state industries. There were reorganisations in transport and utilities and debates about performance and investment constraints. The period ended with case-by-case rescues in sectors under pressure, which prompted new instruments for public stakes.

=== Crisis nationalisations and the National Enterprise Board (1970s) ===
The Industry Act 1975 established the National Enterprise Board to take and manage public shareholdings for industrial policy and rescues. Interventions included support for British Leyland and the creation of state groups in aircraft and shipbuilding under the Aircraft and Shipbuilding Industries Act 1977. The approach relied on company-law vehicles alongside statutory corporations and raised questions about stewardship and competition.

=== Privatisation and market reforms (1979 to 1997) ===
From 1979 the government pursued a sustained programme of privatisation across telecoms, gas, electricity, airlines, steel, water and airports. Ownership moved to the private sector, while sector regulators and price controls replaced direct ministerial direction. The break-up of state conglomerates and utility restructuring set the framework for later market regulation.

=== Rail franchising and the public backstop (1990s to 2000s) ===
The Railways Act 1993 introduced franchising for passenger services and created a duty on the state to secure services if a franchise failed or ended. Infrastructure passed from British Rail to Railtrack, which entered railway administration in 2001. Network Rail took ownership in 2002. In 2013 the ONS decided that Network Rail would be classified to the public sector from 1 September 2014 under ESA 2010, which moved its debt onto the public balance sheet. The operator of last resort duty became the mechanism for continuity of service when contracts failed or expired.

=== The financial crisis and temporary bank ownership (2008 to 2012) ===
The state took temporary stakes in several banks to stabilise the system. Resolution actions covered Northern Rock and Bradford & Bingley, and the government took large holdings in Lloyds Banking Group and what is now NatWest Group. In 2008 the government created UK Financial Investments to manage these shareholdings, which later moved into UK Government Investments. Exits proceeded over subsequent years, with the final NatWest shares sold in May 2025.

=== Reclassification and new public bodies (2013 to 2020) ===
Sector boundaries shifted through statistical decisions and organisational reforms. English housing associations were classified to the public sector in 2015 then returned to the private sector in 2017 after governance changes. Royal Mail was floated in 2013 and the Post Office remained a state-owned company under the Postal Services Act 2011. Trading funds were reorganised into government-owned companies in some cases, including Ordnance Survey in 2015, and the strategic highways authority became National Highways in 2015 as a government-owned company under the Infrastructure Act 2015.

=== New instruments in the 2020s: development banks, system operators and targeted stakes ===
New entities focused on financing, infrastructure and system operation. The UK Infrastructure Bank was established in 2021 and was renamed National Wealth Fund Limited in October 2024. In the energy system the National Energy System Operator began operations as a public corporation on 1 October 2024. The Great British Energy programme gained statutory footing in 2025. The Department for Transport increased use of the operator of last resort and renamed its owning group DfT Operator Limited in December 2024.

=== Devolution and divergence across the UK ===
After devolution, ownership models diverged. Scottish Water remained in public ownership under the Water Industry (Scotland) Act 2002, while water and sewerage services in England and Wales were privatised under the Water Act 1989. In Northern Ireland, Northern Ireland Water was created as a government-owned company in 2007 and has been classified by the ONS to central government on a non-market basis. Rail operations in Scotland and Wales moved into devolved owning groups for public operation of passenger services.

=== Classification shifts and control tests in practice ===
Across these periods, statistical treatment often changed without a conventional purchase or sale. The ONS applies control indicators and a market-producer test to decide whether an entity is a public corporation or part of central or local government. Decisions such as the 2014 reclassification of Network Rail and the 2015 to 2017 changes for English housing associations demonstrate how governance and revenue structures affect classification and the count of state-owned enterprises.

== Current state-owned enterprises (central government) ==
This section lists central government state-owned enterprises that meet the Office for National Statistics tests for public control and, where relevant, the market-producer test for public corporations, together with government-owned companies created under the Companies Act. It excludes devolved and local bodies, which appear later, and private operators under contract. Definitions are set out in Terminology and scope.

=== Broadcasting and culture ===
- British Broadcasting Corporation — statutory corporation established by Royal Charter, a public service broadcaster operating as a public corporation, sponsored by the Department for Culture, Media and Sport. As of October 2025, the Charter and Framework govern the BBC’s independence and funding arrangements.
- Channel 4 — statutory corporation and public service broadcaster, remains in public ownership following the 2023 government review, sponsored by DCMS.
- S4C — statutory corporation providing Welsh-language television, sponsored by DCMS with funding arrangements set out in its framework documents.

=== Finance and investment ===
- National Wealth Fund Limited — government-owned company headquartered in Leeds, formerly the UK Infrastructure Bank and renamed on 14 October 2024, shareholder functions sit with HM Treasury.
- British Business Bank — government-owned public limited company providing finance programmes for smaller businesses, sponsored by the Department for Business and Trade.
- British International Investment — government-owned public limited company and the UK’s development finance institution, shareholder is the Foreign, Commonwealth and Development Office.
- UK Government Investments — government-owned company acting as the centre of government ownership expertise, shareholder is HM Treasury.
- Reclaim Fund — public body company administering the Dormant Assets Scheme, owned by HM Treasury and regulated by the Financial Conduct Authority.
- Post Office Limited – retail post office company owned entirely by the UK government, with the Department for Business and Trade as shareholder.
- UK Asset Resolution – company wholly owned by HM Treasury, with the shareholding managed by UK Government Investments.
- The Crown Estate – statutory corporation classified as a non-financial public corporation by the Office for National Statistics.

=== Energy and resources ===
- National Energy System Operator — public corporation responsible for electricity and gas system operation in Great Britain, created by transfer from National Grid ESO on 1 October 2024 following Ofgem and DESNZ decisions.
- Great British Energy — state-owned company established by the Great British Energy Act 2025 to invest in clean power projects, sponsored by DESNZ.
- Great British Energy – Nuclear — government company leading civil new-build and fuel cycle projects, rebranded from Great British Nuclear in December 2024.
- United Kingdom National Nuclear Laboratory — government-owned national laboratory for civil fission, classified as a public corporation and sponsored by DESNZ.
- Nuclear Restoration Services — Nuclear Decommissioning Authority group company, formerly Magnox Ltd, responsible for decommissioning the Magnox fleet.
- Nuclear Waste Services — NDA subsidiary providing radioactive waste management services, including delivery of the Geological Disposal Facility programme.
- Sellafield Ltd — NDA subsidiary and site licence company managing the Sellafield site in Cumbria.

=== Defence and manufacturing ===
- AWE Nuclear Security Technologies – became a non-departmental public body wholly owned by the Ministry of Defence on 1 July 2021.
- British Steel - brought into public ownership on 16 July 2026.
- Sheffield Forgemasters – acquired by the Ministry of Defence in 2021.

=== Transport and infrastructure ===
- Network Rail — company limited by guarantee responsible for railway infrastructure in Great Britain, reclassified to the public sector in 2014 and treated as part of central government by the ONS.
- National Highways — government-owned company for England’s strategic roads, launched as Highways England on 1 April 2015 and renamed National Highways in 2021, sponsored by the Department for Transport.
- High Speed Two (HS2) Ltd — government-owned company delivering elements of the high-speed rail programme, sponsored by the Department for Transport.
- East West Railway Company — government-owned company developing the Oxford–Cambridge rail link, sponsored by the Department for Transport.
- Platform4 — government-owned property and regeneration company focused on rail-related assets, sponsored by the Department for Transport.
- DfT Operator — the Department for Transport holding group for operator of last resort train companies, operates services under time-limited Service Agreements rather than franchises.
- Direct Rail Services – rail freight operator and wholly owned subsidiary of the Nuclear Decommissioning Authority.

=== Registers and services ===
- Ordnance Survey — government-owned company since 2015 providing national geospatial data, sponsored by the business department.
- UK Hydrographic Office — trading fund supplying hydrographic and marine geospatial services, sponsored by the Ministry of Defence.
- Met Office — the UK’s national meteorological service, classified as a public corporation and sponsored by the science department.
- National Physical Laboratory – the UK’s national metrology institute, a public corporation of the Department for Science, Innovation and Technology.
- The Royal Mint — government-owned company producing UK coinage and operating commercial precious-metals businesses, shareholder functions are exercised by HM Treasury.
- Student Loans Company — government-owned company administering student finance, sponsored by the Department for Education and devolved administrations.
- Civil Aviation Authority — statutory regulator of civil aviation and a public corporation, sponsored by the Department for Transport.
- Genomics England — company wholly owned by the Department of Health and Social Care providing genomic services for the NHS and research access to de-identified data.
- NHS Professionals — company wholly owned by the Department of Health and Social Care providing temporary staffing and workforce services to the NHS.
- Porton Biopharma — Department of Health and Social Care-owned biopharmaceutical company associated with UKHSA’s Porton site, status under review in 2025 reporting.

=== Operator of Last Resort ===
Under section 30 of the Railways Act 1993, the Department for Transport (DfT) must ensure continuity of passenger services if a franchise or contract ends or is terminated. The DfT fulfils this duty through DfT Operator Limited (DFTO), a government-owned holding group that manages state-run operators under time-limited service agreements rather than franchises. DFTO was known as DfT OLR Holdings Limited until a name change recorded in December 2024.

As of October 2025, DFTO manages the following train operating companies, with the date each entered public operation:

- London North Eastern Railway — 24 June 2018.
- Northern Trains — 1 March 2020.
- Southeastern — 17 October 2021.
- TransPennine Trains — 28 May 2023.
- South Western Railway — 25 May 2025.
- C2c — 20 July 2025.
- Greater Anglia — 12 October 2025.

Devolved governments operate separate publicly owned arrangements outside DFTO. Scottish Rail Holdings took ScotRail into public ownership on 1 April 2022 and the Caledonian Sleeper on 25 June 2023. In Wales, Transport for Wales Rail took over the Wales and Borders services on 7 February 2021. These are covered in the devolved administrations section.

=== Strategic minority holdings ===
The UK government holds minority stakes in some commercial entities for strategic or policy reasons. These holdings do not necessarily imply government control under Office for National Statistics classification tests and they are listed here for context rather than as state-owned enterprises.

As of December 2025, notable examples include:

- NATS – public private partnership for UK air traffic services. The UK government holds 49% and a special share.
- Eutelsat Group – the UK government holds a minority shareholding and retains a special share connected to the UK-based subsidiary Eutelsat OneWeb.
- Urenco – one third of the shares are ultimately held by the UK government, alongside the Dutch government and two German utility shareholders.
- Fera Science – joint venture company in which the Department for Environment, Food and Rural Affairs retains a 25% stake, with the majority shareholding held by a private investor following the 2023 to 2024 transaction.

=== Golden and special shares ===
The UK state also holds minority interests in some private companies through golden or special shares, often to protect national security or the continuity of services. These shares do not usually amount to public-sector control of general corporate policy, so they are listed here for context rather than as state-owned enterprises.

Examples include:

- Rolls-Royce Holdings: a £1 special non-voting share is held by the UK Secretary of State for Business and Trade, with specified consent rights set out in the company's articles of association.
- BAE Systems: a special share is held by the Secretary of State for Business and Trade, including consent requirements affecting certain provisions such as foreign shareholding restrictions in the articles of association.
- QinetiQ: a special share is held by HM Government through the Secretary of State for Defence, conferring rights intended to protect UK defence and security interests.
- International Distribution Services (Royal Mail): as part of the approved takeover by EP Group, the government retains a golden share with veto-type protections over specified matters including headquarters location and tax residency.

The government holds numerous minority equity interests via investment programmes that do not imply control, for example the British Business Bank's Future Fund portfolio.

== Northern Ireland Executive ==
=== Current ===
- Translink — trading brand of the state-owned Northern Ireland Transport Holding Company (NITHC), a statutory corporation sponsored by the Department for Infrastructure. NITHC owns the operating companies NI Railways, Ulsterbus and Citybus (Metro).
  - Metro (Belfast) — Belfast bus network operated by Citybus Ltd, a NITHC subsidiary.
  - Ulsterbus — regional bus operator under NITHC ownership.
  - NI Railways — passenger rail operator owned through NITHC.
- Northern Ireland Water — government-owned company providing water and sewerage services across Northern Ireland, created in 2007 and classified to central government for budgeting and funding.
- Belfast Harbour Commissioners — statutory public trust port for Belfast, with board appointments by the Department for Infrastructure.
- Londonderry Port and Harbour Commissioners — statutory trust port for the River Foyle based at Lisahally.
- Warrenpoint Harbour Authority — statutory trust port at Carlingford Lough.
- Coleraine Harbour Commissioners — statutory trust port at the River Bann.

=== Former ===
- ILEX Urban Regeneration Company — urban regeneration company for Derry~Londonderry established in 2003, dissolved on 13 October 2020.

=== Related bodies ===
- Ulster Supported Employment — executive non-departmental public body and company limited by guarantee delivering supported employment services. Included here as a related body rather than a public corporation.

== Scottish Government ==
=== Current ===
- Caledonian Maritime Assets — company wholly owned by the Scottish Ministers that owns ferries and harbour infrastructure used on the Clyde and Hebrides and Northern Isles networks; sponsored by Transport Scotland.
- David MacBrayne — company wholly owned by the Scottish Ministers that owns operating subsidiaries providing lifeline ferry services under public service contracts let by Transport Scotland.
  - Caledonian MacBrayne — ferry operator trading as CalMac Ferries on the Clyde and Hebrides network, operated under contract to Transport Scotland through David MacBrayne subsidiaries.
- Ferguson Marine — shipyard at Port Glasgow taken into public ownership in 2019 and retained by the Scottish Ministers through Ferguson Marine (Port Glasgow) Holdings Ltd.
- Highlands and Islands Airports — company wholly owned by the Scottish Ministers that operates airports across the Highlands and Islands and at Dundee and Inverness.
- Glasgow Prestwick Airport — airport owned by the Scottish Ministers through Prestwick Aviation Holdings Ltd since 2013.
- Scottish Water — public corporation providing water and wastewater services in Scotland, established by the Water Industry (Scotland) Act 2002 and owned by the Scottish Ministers.
- Scottish Canals — operating name of the British Waterways Board in Scotland, a Scottish public corporation managing canals and associated assets on behalf of the Scottish Ministers.
- Scottish National Investment Bank — development bank established by the Scottish National Investment Bank Act 2020, wholly owned by the Scottish Ministers.
- Scottish Rail Holdings — company wholly owned by the Scottish Ministers that owns the rail operating companies listed below.
  - ScotRail — passenger services brought into public ownership on 1 April 2022.
  - Caledonian Sleeper — overnight services brought into public ownership on 25 June 2023.
- Crown Estate Scotland — statutory public corporation managing the Scottish Crown Estate assets, established by the Scottish Crown Estate Act 2019.

=== Former ===
- BiFab — fabrication company in which the Scottish Government held an equity stake from 2017; the business entered administration in 2020 and its yards were subsequently sold in 2021.

=== Related bodies ===
- Scottish Futures Trust — company limited by guarantee wholly owned by the Scottish Ministers that provides infrastructure investment and programme advisory services. It is a non-departmental public body and is not generally treated as a market public corporation.

== Welsh Government ==
=== Current ===
- Transport for Wales — company limited by guarantee wholly owned by the Welsh Ministers that plans and manages public transport services; it owns the Core Valley Lines rail infrastructure and lets operating contracts.
  - Transport for Wales Rail — government-owned operator of last resort that took over the Wales and Borders rail services on 7 February 2021.
- Development Bank of Wales — development finance institution, a public limited company wholly owned by the Welsh Ministers, providing debt and equity to Welsh businesses.
- WGC Holdco Ltd (Cardiff Airport) — holding company through which the Welsh Ministers have owned Cardiff Airport since 2013.
- Global Centre of Rail Excellence — Welsh Government-owned company developing a rail testing and innovation facility in Powys and Neath Port Talbot.
- Cwmni Egino — Welsh Government company established to support the delivery of nuclear development at Trawsfynydd.
- Adnodd Cyf — national company created by the Welsh Government to commission high-quality bilingual educational resources for schools and colleges in Wales.
- Careers Choices Dewis Gyrfa Ltd — Welsh Government-owned company delivering the all-age careers information, advice and guidance service in Wales.
- Life Sciences Hub Wales — company limited by guarantee wholly owned by the Welsh Ministers to stimulate growth of the life sciences sector and support NHS innovation adoption.
- Meat Promotion Wales — Welsh Ministers’ levy body for the red meat sector, operating as Hybu Cig Cymru under statutory orders.
- Design Commission for Wales — arm’s-length company limited by guarantee promoting good design in the built environment, sponsored by the Welsh Government.
- Centre for Digital Public Services — company limited by guarantee established by the Welsh Government to improve digital capability across public services.
- National Academy for Educational Leadership — company limited by guarantee funded by the Welsh Government to support leadership in education.

=== Former ===
- none listed.

=== Related bodies ===
- Trydan Gwyrdd Cymru — publicly owned renewable energy developer announced by the Welsh Government; company establishment and programme delivery are in progress, with details published through policy updates. Placeholders here pending operational status.

== Local government companies ==
Municipal companies in the United Kingdom are "local authority trading companies" (LATCos) and other corporate vehicles wholly or jointly owned by local or combined authorities. They are typically established under the Local Authorities (Companies) Order 1995 and related powers, sometimes operating in-house under the procurement "Teckal" exemption. The lists below give notable examples by nation. Entries are limited to corporate entities. Transport authorities and branded networks that are not companies are listed separately as related bodies.

=== Companies owned by municipalities of England ===
- Blackpool Transport – municipal bus operator (Blackpool Council).
- Ipswich Buses – municipal bus operator (Ipswich Borough Council).
- Nottingham City Transport – municipal bus operator (majority owned by Nottingham City Council).
- Reading Buses – municipal bus operator (Reading Borough Council).
- Warrington's Own Buses – municipal bus operator (Warrington Borough Council).
- Manchester Airports Group – airports holding company (64.5% owned by the ten Greater Manchester councils via Manchester City Council and the other nine councils).
- Newcastle International Airport – public-private partnership: 51% owned by seven North East local authorities (LA7) and 49% by the private partner.
- Cornwall Airport Newquay – owned by Cornwall Council and operated by Cornwall Airport Limited (wholly council-owned).
- Portsmouth International Port – municipally owned and operated port (Portsmouth City Council).
- The Bottle Yard Studios – film and TV studios owned by Bristol City Council.

==== Related public bodies (not companies) ====
These are transport authorities, branded networks or systems rather than corporate LATCos.

- Transport for Greater Manchester – combined authority transport executive; owns the Manchester Metrolink system and lets operating concessions.
- Merseytravel – transport executive of the Liverpool City Region Combined Authority.
- Transport for West Midlands – transport arm of the West Midlands Combined Authority; includes West Midlands Metro network brand.
- West Yorkshire Metro – public transport brand of the West Yorkshire Combined Authority.
- Nexus – Tyne and Wear transport executive (successor to the Tyne & Wear Passenger Transport Executive); administers the Tyne and Wear Metro.
- Sheffield International Venues / Sheffield City Trust – independent charity/company that formerly ran council leisure venues under contract; operations transferred to a private operator in 2024.
- South Yorkshire Passenger Transport Executive – abolished; transport functions integrated into the South Yorkshire Mayoral Combined Authority in 2023.

==== Greater London Authority companies ====
- Transport for London – GLA functional body; group parent for transport subsidiaries including London Underground.
- GLA Land and Property – GLA subsidiary land and development company.
- London Power – energy supplier brand/company wholly owned by the GLA and delivered in partnership with Octopus Energy.
- * Buses for London – municipal bus company owned by the Greater London Authority.

=== Companies owned by municipalities of Scotland ===
- Lothian Buses – municipal bus operator (majority owned by the City of Edinburgh Council; minority stakes held by Midlothian, East Lothian and West Lothian councils).
- Transport for Edinburgh – council-owned holding/oversight company for buses and trams in Edinburgh.
- Orkney Ferries – council-owned inter-island ferry company (Orkney Islands Council).
- SIC Ferries – Shetland Islands Council ferries undertaking for inter-island services.

==== Related public bodies (not companies) ====
- Strathclyde Partnership for Transport – statutory regional transport partnership; not a company.
- Strathclyde Buses – former municipal bus company; acquired by FirstGroup in the 1990s (listed under "Former" if needed).

=== Companies owned by municipalities of Wales ===
- Cardiff Bus – municipal bus operator (Cardiff Council).
- Newport Bus – municipal bus operator (Newport City Council).

=== Companies owned by municipalities of Northern Ireland ===
- City of Derry Airport – owned by Derry City and Strabane District Council.

== Proposed bodies ==
This section lists central proposals that have formal government documentation. Entries remain here until legislation has passed and the body is operational.

- Great British Railways — planned arm’s length public body intended to act as a single "guiding mind" for Great Britain’s railways by bringing together infrastructure management with most passenger services in England and by setting fares and timetables. The concept was set out in the Williams–Shapps plan and remains a live government programme. As of As of October 2025, the government has consulted on a Railways Bill, the 2024 King’s Speech confirmed legislation in this session, and ministers have stated that a bill to establish GBR will be introduced with the aim of the body becoming operational roughly twelve months after Royal Assent. The previous Great British Railways Transition Team ceased in March 2025 and preparatory work is now led from the Department for Transport and industry teams.

== Former state-owned enterprises ==
This section summarises major United Kingdom state-owned enterprises that left the public sector through privatisation, restructuring or disposal. Entries are grouped by sector with brief status notes and dates, fuller histories are linked from each article.

=== Utilities and communications ===
- British Telecommunications — converted to a public limited company by the British Telecommunications Act 1984 and sold in stages from 1984 and 1991.
- British Gas — transferred to private ownership under the Gas Act 1986, creating Centrica and related successor bodies over time.
- Electricity sector in England and Wales — generation and supply functions privatised under the Electricity Act 1989 with the break-up of the Central Electricity Generating Board and the flotation of regional electricity companies; transmission moved to the National Grid Company plc.
- Water industry in England and Wales — the ten water and sewerage authorities were transferred to private companies at flotation in 1989; Scotland retained public ownership via Scottish Water.

=== Oil and nuclear ===
- BP – the government began selling down its shareholding in 1979 and completed a major further sale by share offer in 1987.
- Britoil: a majority stake was sold in November 1982, and the remaining Government shareholding was sold in 1985.
- Enterprise Oil: sold in June 1984.
- British Energy: sold in July 1996.
- British Nuclear Fuels Limited: reorganised in the 2000s with major assets and liabilities transferring to the Nuclear Decommissioning Authority in 2005, followed by sales of subsidiaries and contracting-out of functions; the company was ultimately wound up in 2010.

=== Defence and aerospace ===
- QinetiQ: created from Ministry of Defence research organisations and part-sold in 2003, followed by a flotation in 2006 and disposal of the remaining Government stake in 2008.
- Royal Dockyards: operations were transferred to commercial management in the late 1980s.
- Royal Ordnance: sold to British Aerospace in April 1987.
- Short Brothers: sold to Bombardier in October 1989.
- Rolls-Royce: acquired into public ownership after bankruptcy in 1971 and privatised in 1987.
- Rolls-Royce – the aerospace business was taken into public ownership in 1971 and returned to the private sector in 1987.
- British Aerospace – transferred from a statutory corporation to a company under the British Aerospace Act 1980, with the government selling down and later disposing of residual shareholdings following flotation in the 1980s.

=== Industry, steel and shipbuilding ===
- British Steel – corporatised and privatised under the British Steel Act 1988, later becoming part of Corus Group.
- British Coal – coal mining operations were wound up or transferred under the Coal Industry Act 1994 following closures and sales of assets.
- British Shipbuilders – shipbuilding holding company whose assets were sold off in the 1980s following government decisions to privatise major parts of the group.

=== Transport and logistics ===
- British Rail – reorganised and its assets transferred under the Railways Act 1993 as rail services moved to private operators and infrastructure was separated into successor bodies. Subsequent changes included the creation of Railtrack for infrastructure and later public-sector classification of Network Rail.
- British Airways – transferred to British Airways plc by the British Airways Act 1983 and privatised through share sales in the 1980s.
- BAA – airports authority corporatised under the Airports Act 1986 and later privatised, with subsequent changes to its airport holdings and branding.
- National Bus Company – state holding company for bus operators that was sold off through management and trade sales in the late 1980s and early 1990s.
- National Freight Corporation – road freight and logistics group sold in 1982 through an employee-led buyout, one of the early privatisations of a nationalised business.
- Associated British Ports: sold in stages from February 1983 to April 1984.
- Cable & Wireless: sold in tranches between 1981 and 1985.
- Girobank: sold by the Post Office to the private sector, with the sale completed in July 1990.
- National Air Traffic Services: transferred to a public–private partnership in 2001, giving operational control and a significant private-sector shareholding.
- The Tote: sold in 2011.
- Thomas Cook: sold in May 1972 under powers in the Transport Holding Company Act 1972.
- Royal Mail: floated in October 2013, while Post Office Ltd remained in the public sector.

=== Automotive ===
- Rover Group – the car maker, formerly part of the British Leyland group, was sold to British Aerospace in 1988 as part of its privatisation.

=== Science, technology and industry ===
- Amersham International: floated in February 1982, with the Government selling 100% of the shares.
- British Technology Group: privatised in March 1992, following legislation to enable the sale.
- AEA Technology: floated in September 1996 following the separation of commercial operations from the UK Atomic Energy Authority.

=== Banking and finance (temporary ownership) ===
- Northern Rock and Bradford & Bingley – taken into temporary public ownership during the 2007–2009 financial crisis, with assets managed through successor arrangements including UK Financial Investments (later UK Government Investments).
- Lloyds Banking Group and RBS/NatWest – large stakes acquired during the financial crisis and later reduced through phased disposals as government exited its shareholdings.

=== Minority or partial state holdings later sold ===
- International Computers Limited: the National Enterprise Board held about 25% of the company in the late 1970s, and the holding was later sold as part of wider disposals of NEB shareholdings.
- Ferranti: the National Enterprise Board held a substantial stake, which was later sold as part of the same disposal programme.

== See also ==
- Devolution in the United Kingdom
- Executive agency
- Government-owned corporation
- Nationalisation
- Non-departmental public body
- Operator of last resort
- Privatisation
- Rail franchising in Great Britain
- State-owned enterprise
- Trading fund
