= Passenger rail franchising in Great Britain =

Outsourcing of rail transport

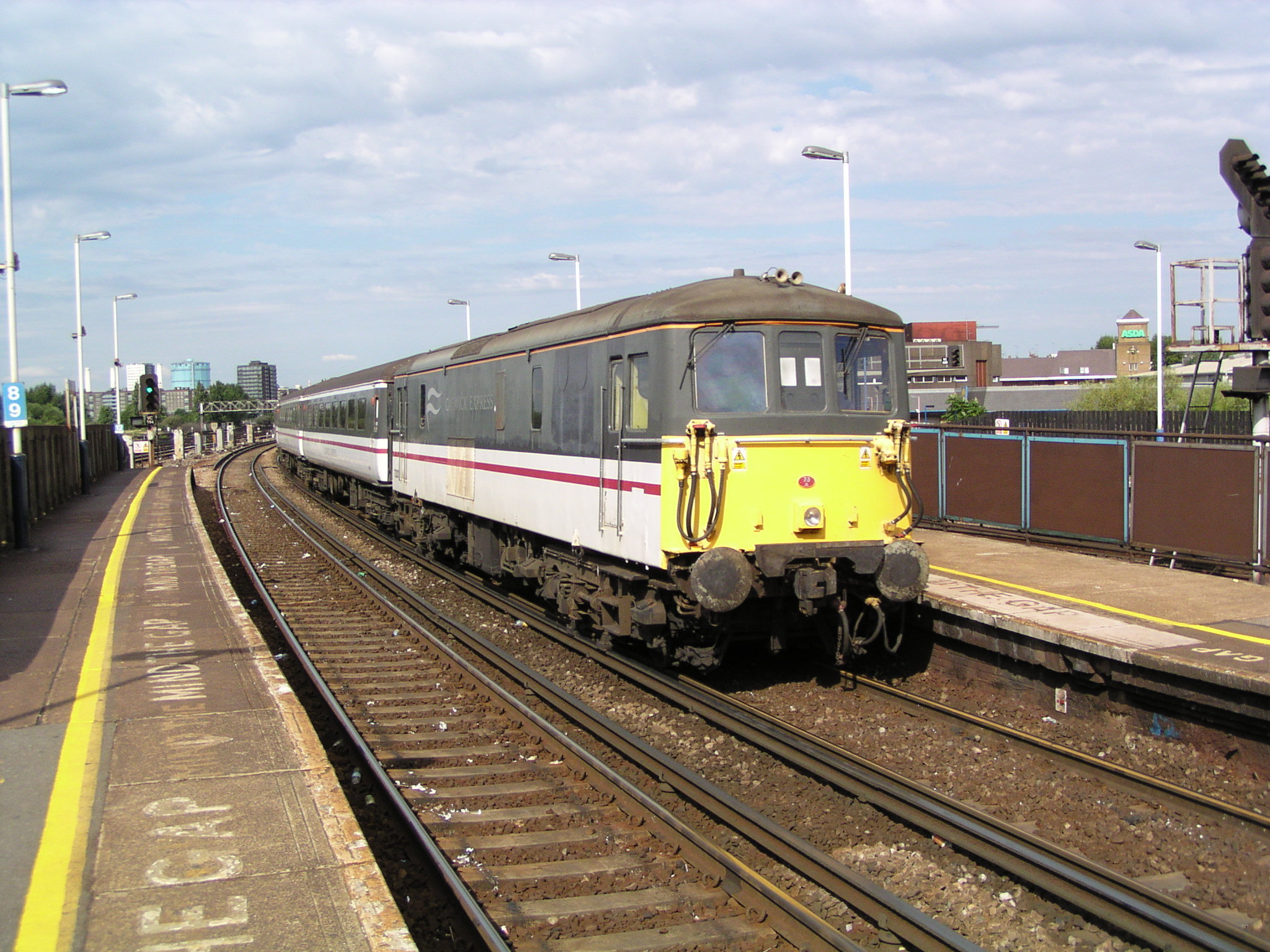
Gatwick Express, the third railway service to be franchised in 1996

Passenger rail franchising in Great Britain was the system of contracting the operation of the passenger services on the railways of Great Britain to private companies, which was in effect from 1996 before being greatly altered in 2020, and effectively abolished in May 2021. In 2024 rail franchising was formally abolished, with rail contracts set to enter state control at the expiration of their contracts from 2025 onwards.

The system was created as part of the privatisation of British Rail, the former state-owned railway operator, and involved franchises being awarded by the government to train operating companies (TOCs) through a process of competitive tendering. Franchises usually lasted for a minimum of seven years and covered a defined geographic area or service type; by design, franchises were not awarded on an exclusive basis, and day-to-day competition with other franchises and open access operators was possible, albeit occurring on a limited number of services. Over the years, the system evolved, most notably reducing the initial 25 franchises to 17 through a series of mergers. As of October 2025, ten franchises are in state ownership under the DfT Operator with five more to follow in 2026, as more passenger services are gradually renationalised.

The Conservative government initially suspended rail franchising in order to maintain service as passenger demand fell due to the COVID-19 pandemic, but on 21 September 2020 permanently abolished the rail franchising policy, and put in place emergency arrangements which effectively converted the franchises into concession-based management contracts. The successor Labour government confirmed in 2024 that the train operating companies would be brought into state ownership as their contracts expired, a process that is expected to be complete by June 2027.

The system only covered the railways of Great Britain (including the Isle of Wight); the railways in Northern Ireland are owned and operated by the state-owned company NI Railways.

== Process ==
=== Tendering, monitoring and termination ===
Railway franchises are decided by the UK Government's Department for Transport (DfT), who design the boundaries and terms of service, and award contracts to the train operating companies. Under the devolved administration arrangements, franchises for ScotRail and Caledonian Sleeper are awarded by Transport Scotland and the Wales & Borders franchise is awarded by Transport for Wales.

Prior to formally tendering a specific franchise, the DfT publishes a Prior Information Notice (PIN) outlining the basic details, and opens a consultation with relevant transport authorities, devolved administrations and the Transport Focus watchdog. At the end of this process, a formal Invitation To Tender (ITT) setting out the detailed terms of the proposed franchise agreement is sent to the three to five prospective bidders who have been identified as pre-qualified. ITT's may include a range of variations for consideration by the prospective bidder, who may also submit variations themselves. The franchise is awarded to the bid which is deemed most viable, and which offers the best value and reliability. If relevant, bidders' past performance is also considered.

Performance is monitored throughout the contract period.

In contrast to earlier bail-outs, following the 2004 changes in approach to cost/revenue risk, unless there are exceptional circumstances, the DfT's policy toward failing franchises is not to rescue them with further financial assistance. Instead, DfT will hold them to the agreement and terminate the franchise early, and then run the franchise directly as an operator of last resort (OOLR), pending a re-tendering. Agreements also contain a cross-default clause, which allows other franchises also held by the company or an affiliate to be terminated.

=== Financing ===
Rail franchise holders in Great Britain accept commercial risk, although there are clauses in newer franchises which offer some compensation for lower-than-expected revenue (and also claw back some excess profits, should these occur).

The main costs incurred by franchisees are track access charges (paid to Network Rail); other significant costs come from staffing, leasing stations (from NR) and rolling stock (from ROSCOs). Franchisees also pay for light maintenance of stock, with heavy work being done as part of the ROSCO lease. The main revenue stream is from fares, supplemented by the franchise subsidy in cases where there is a shortfall. In addition, franchisees are allowed to sub-let commercial units directly in leased stations.

== Operators ==
=== Privately operated ===
The following national rail contracts are operated by private companies.

Privately operated national rail contracts in Great Britain
Franchise	Franchise since	TOC	Owner	Start date	Core term expiry date	Original end date	Nationalisation date
East Midlands	11 November 2007	East Midlands Railway	Transport UK Group	18 August 2019	18 October 2026	13 October 2030	by end of 2027 (TBC)
Greater Western	1 April 2006	Great Western Railway	FirstGroup	1 April 2006	22 June 2025	25 June 2028	13 December 2026
New CrossCountry	11 November 2007	CrossCountry	Arriva	11 November 2007	17 October 2027	12 October 2031	Autumn 2027 (TBC)
West Coast Partnership	8 December 2019	Avanti West Coast	FirstGroup (70%); Trenitalia (30%)	8 December 2019	18 October 2026	17 October 2032	7 March 2027

=== Government owned ===
The following services are operated by the UK, Welsh or Scottish governments.

Government owned train operating companies in Great Britain
Franchise	Franchise since	TOC	Parent	Start date
Caledonian Sleeper	1 April 2015	Caledonian Sleeper	Scottish Rail Holdings	25 June 2023
Chiltern	21 July 1996	Chiltern Railways	DfT Operator	20 September 2026
Essex Thameside	26 May 1996	c2c	DfT Operator	20 July 2025
East Anglia	1 April 2004	Greater Anglia	DfT Operator	12 October 2025
InterCity East Coast	28 April 1996	London North Eastern Railway	DfT Operator	24 June 2018
Northern	1 April 2016	Northern	DfT Operator	1 March 2020
ScotRail	31 March 1997	ScotRail	Scottish Rail Holdings	1 April 2022
South Eastern	1 April 2006	Southeastern	DfT Operator	16 October 2021
South Western	20 August 2017	South Western Railway	DfT Operator	25 May 2025
Thameslink, Southern and Great Northern	14 September 2014	Greater Thameslink Railway	DfT Operator	31 May 2026
TransPennine Express	1 February 2004	TransPennine Express	DfT Operator	28 May 2023
Wales & Borders	14 October 2001	Transport for Wales Rail	Transport for Wales	7 February 2021
West Midlands	10 December 2017	West Midlands Trains	DfT Operator	1 February 2026

=== Concessions ===
A small number of urban railway systems are not franchised but are contracted out as a concession instead. Concession holders are paid a fee to run the service, which is usually tightly specified by the awarding authority. They do not take commercial risk, although there are usually penalties and rewards specified in the contract for large variations in performance.

Rail concessions in Great Britain
Concession	Operator(s)	Start date	End date	Authority
Elizabeth line	GTS Rail Operations	25 May 2025	May 2032	TfL
Docklands Light Railway	KeolisAmey 70%:30%	7 December 2014	31 March 2033	TfL
London Overground	First Rail London	3 May 2026	2034	TfL
Manchester Metrolink	KeolisAmey 60%:40%	15 July 2017	July 2027	TfGM
Merseyrail	Merseyrail Electrics 2002: Serco (50%); Transport UK Group (50%)	23 July 2003	19 July 2028	Merseytravel

The South Yorkshire Supertram was operated under a concession by Stagecoach until March 2024, when it was taken back into public control by the South Yorkshire Mayoral Combined Authority.

=== Open-access operators ===
An open-access operator is a train operating company that is not subject to franchising or concessions, but instead purchases individual train paths from a railway infrastructure company such as Network Rail. These operators include Eurostar, Grand Central, Heathrow Express, Hull Trains, Lumo and Pre Metro Operations (providing a shuttle service on the Stourbridge Town branch line).

=== Former franchises ===
Prior to privatisation, the passenger services of British Rail were organised into three units:

- InterCity for long-distance express services
- Network SouthEast (NSE) for commuter services across East and South East England into the various London termini
- Regional Railways (RR) for services in all other areas

They then underwent further reorganisation in preparation for franchising, being split up into 25 train operating units (TOUs) that were gradually incorporated as separate businesses. These operated as 'shadow franchises' that negotiated contracts individually with regulators, Railtrack (the infrastructure and major station owner) and ROSCOs (the rolling stock leasing companies) before being sold off in 1996 and 1997.

Defunct rail franchises in Great Britain
Franchise	TOC	Start	Finish	Comment
Anglia	Anglia Railways	5 January 1997	31 March 2004	Created from RR unit on privatisation. Awarded to GB Railways. GB Railways was acquired by FirstGroup on 14 August 2003. Amalgamated with the Great Eastern franchise and part of the West Anglia Great Northern franchise to form the new Greater Anglia franchise from 1 April 2004.
Central	Central Trains	2 March 1997	10 November 2007	Created from RR unit on privatisation. Awarded to National Express Group. Split into East Midland, West Midlands and New CrossCountry franchises on 11 November 2007
CrossCountry	Virgin CrossCountry	5 January 1997	10 November 2007	Created from InterCity unit on privatisation. Won by Virgin Rail Group. Stagecoach acquired 49% of VRG in October 1998. Renegotiated as a rolling year-on-year management contract (July 2002). Continued until expiry after failure to renegotiate franchise.
Gatwick Express	Gatwick Express	28 April 1996	21 June 2008	Created from InterCity unit on privatisation. Awarded to National Express Group. Merged into the South Central franchise (being retained as a separate brand).
Great Eastern	First Great Eastern	5 January 1997	31 March 2004	Created from NSE unit on privatisation. Awarded to FirstBus. Amalgamated with the Anglia franchise and the West Anglia part of the West Anglia Great Northern franchise to form the new Greater Anglia franchise on 1 April 2004.
Great Western	First Great Western	4 February 1996	31 March 2006	Created from InterCity unit on privatisation. Amalgamated with Thames Trains and Wessex Trains to form new Greater Western franchise
InterCity West Coast	Virgin Trains	9 March 1997	8 December 2019	Created at privatisation and won by Virgin Rail Group. Stagecoach acquire 49% stake in October 1998. Renegotiated as a management contract (22 July 2002). Subsequently, subject to various Direct Awards. Replaced by West Coast Partnership on 8 December 2019.
Island Line	Island Line	13 October 1996	3 February 2007	Created from NSE unit on privatisation. Awarded to Stagecoach Group. Amalgamated into the South West Trains franchise on 4 February 2007.
London, Tilbury and Southend	LTS Rail	26 May 1996	6 November 2014	Created from NSE unit on privatisation. Won by Prism Rail. Rebranded to c2c and sold to National Express in July 2000. Two year extension (26 May 2011). Two year direct award (26 May 2013). Extension option (September 2014). Renamed as Essex Thameside franchise on 10 November 2014.
Merseyrail Electrics	Merseyrail Electrics	19 January 1997	20 July 2003	Created from RR unit on privatisation. Won by MTL. Rebranded to Arriva Trains Merseyside (27 April 2001). Converted to Merseyrail concession managed by Merseytravel.
Midland Main Line	Midland Mainline	28 April 1996	10 November 2007	Created from InterCity unit on privatisation. Awarded to National Express Group (28 April 1996). Amalgamated with the East Midlands part of the Central Trains franchise to form the new East Midlands franchise (11 November 2007).
Network SouthCentral	Connex South Central	26 May 1996	24 July 2015	Created from NSE unit on privatisation. Won by Connex. Franchise rebranded to South Central (13 October 1996). Operations transferred to Govia through new operator South Central (26 August 2001). Amalgamated with Gatwick Express franchise to form the new South Central (incl Gatwick Express) franchise (20 September 2009). Amalgamated with Thameslink & Great Northern franchise to form the new Thameslink, Southern & Great Northern franchise (25 July 2015).
North London Railways	North London Railways	2 March 1997	10 November 2007	Created from NSE unit on privatisation. Awarded to National Express Group, rebranded to Silverlink (26 September 1997). London metro services transferred to new London Overground concession; rest of franchise amalgamated with the West Midlands part of the Central Trains franchise to form the new West Midlands franchise (11 November 2007).
North West Regional Railways	North Western Trains	2 March 1997	11 December 2004	Created from RR unit on privatisation. Awarded to Great Western Holdings. FirstGroup became sole owner of Great Western Holdings and rebranded to First North Western in March 1998. North Wales services transferred to the Wales & Borders franchise on 28 September 2003. Express services transferred to the new TransPennine Express franchise on 1 February 2004. Remaining services amalgamated with those of the Regional Railways North East franchise to form the new Northern franchise (12 December 2004).
Regional Railways North East	Northern Spirit	2 March 1997	11 December 2004	Created from RR unit on privatisation. Won by MTL. Rebranded to Arriva Trains Northern (27 April 2001). Express services were transferred to new TransPennine Express (1 February 2004); remaining services amalgamated with North West Regional Railways franchise to form the new Northern franchise (12 December 2004).
South Eastern	Connex South Eastern	13 October 1996	31 March 2006	Created from NSE unit on privatisation. Awarded to Connex. Passed to the state-owned South Eastern Trains (9 November 2003). Replaced by the new Integrated Kent franchise (1 April 2006).
South Wales & West	Wales & West	13 October 1996	13 October 2001	Created from NSE unit on privatisation. Awarded to Prism Rail. Split in two, with part of it going to new Wales & Borders franchise. Remainder forming new Wessex franchise.
South Western	South Western Railway	20 August 2017	25 May 2025	Replaced SWT in August 2017. Replaced by the DfT Operator-operated South Western Railway as a part of the Starmer ministry's policy of rail re-nationalisation under Great British Railways.
South West Trains	South West Trains	4 February 1996	3 February 2007	Created from NSE unit on privatisation. Awarded to Stagecoach Group. Amalgamated with the Island Line franchise to form the new South Western franchise (4 February 2007).
Thameslink	Thameslink	2 March 1997	31 March 2006	Created from NSE unit on privatisation. Awarded to Govia. Amalgamated with the remainder of the West Anglia Great Northern franchise to form the new Thameslink Great Northern franchise (1 April 2006).
Thames Trains	Thames Trains	13 October 1996	31 March 2006	Created from NSE unit on privatisation. Awarded to Go-Ahead Group. Upon being awarded to First Great Western Link, owned by FirstGroup (1 April 2004). Amalgamated with the Great Western and Wessex franchises to form the new Greater Western franchise (1 April 2006).
Valley Lines	Valley Lines	13 October 1996	13 October 2001	Created from RR unit on privatisation. Awarded to Prism Rail, trading as Valley Lines (13 October 1996). Prism Rail acquired by National Express (18 July 2000). Amalgamated with the Wales part of the South Wales & West franchise to form the new Wales & Borders franchise (14 October 2001).
Wessex Trains	Wessex Trains	14 October 2001	31 March 2006	Formed from the West Country part of the South Wales & West franchise. Retained by National Express, now trading as Wessex Trains (14 October 2001). Amalgamated with the Great Western and Thames Trains franchises to form the new Greater Western franchise (1 April 2006).
Great Northern	West Anglia Great Northern	5 January 1997	31 March 2006	Created from InterCity unit on privatisation. Awarded to Prism Rail. From 1 April 2004: Parts transferred to new Greater Anglia franchise. 1 April 2006: remainder transferred to new Thameslink & Great Northern franchise.

== History ==
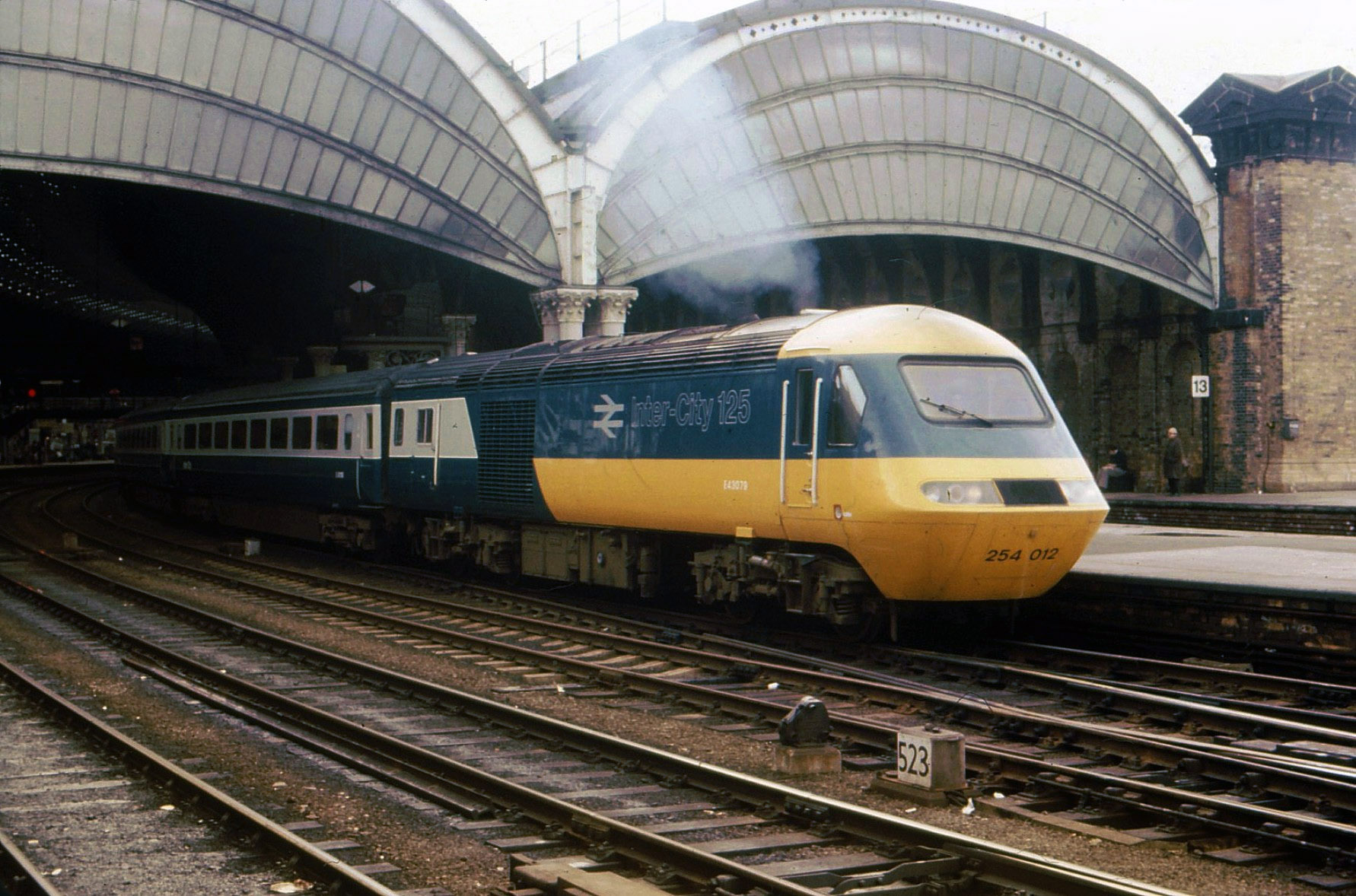
Before privatisation: an InterCity train owned and operated by British Rail

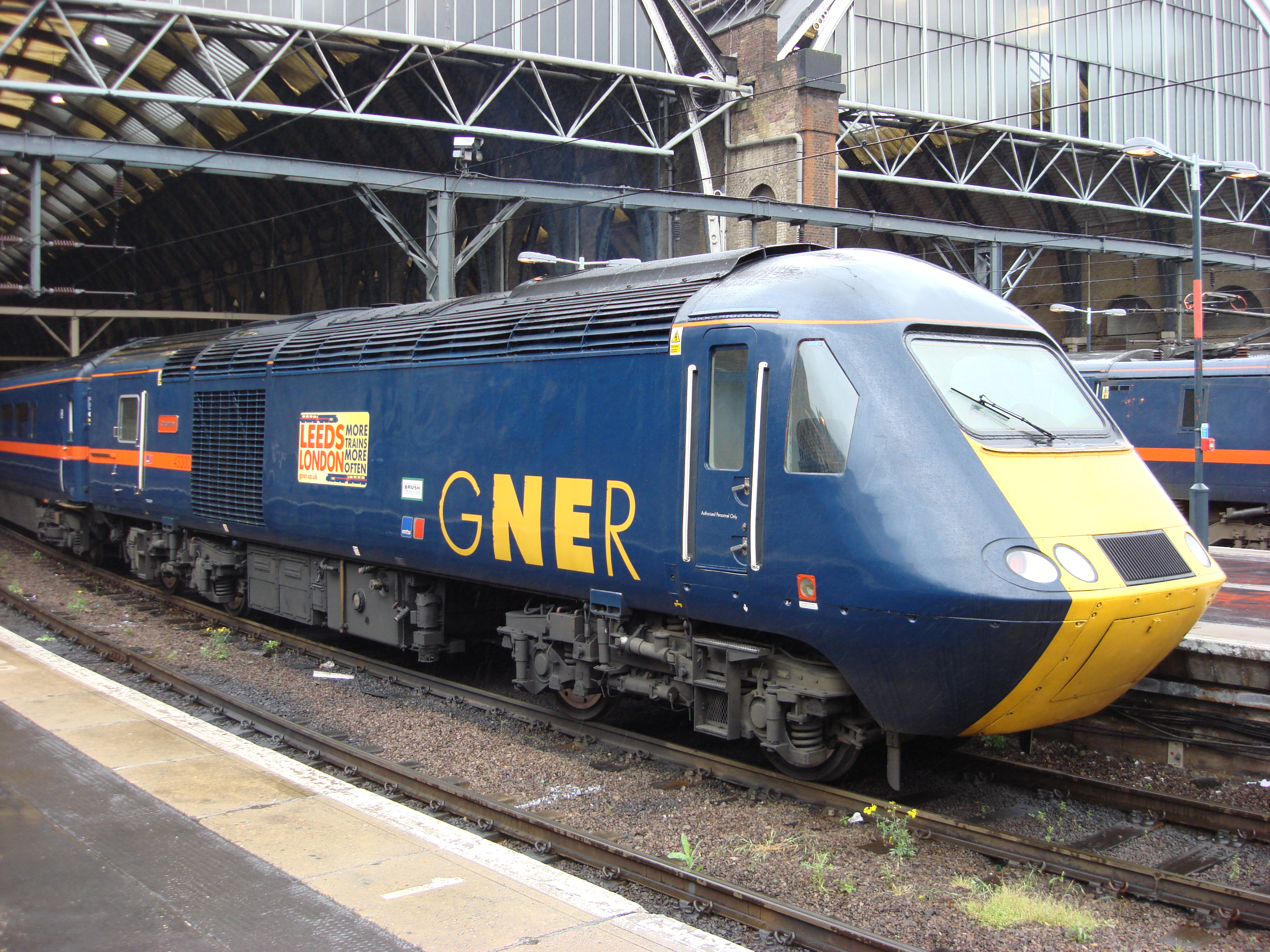
After franchising: a GNER operated train on the InterCity East Coast franchise

=== 1996–1997: Genesis to sale ===
The franchising system was created by the Railways Act 1993 as part of the privatisation of British Rail by the Government of John Major, and the first franchises came into effect in 1996. Prior to this, the railway system had been owned and operated by the state-owned corporation British Rail (BR), which has since been wound up.

Prime Minister John Major envisaged splitting up the railways and returning ownership to an equivalent of the Big Four railway companies that had existed before the creation of British Rail. The Treasury advocated an alternative plan put forward by the Adam Smith Institute which separated railway infrastructure from train service operation and contracted out passenger services to seven-year franchises. This scheme formed the basis of the system which was implemented, which saw the creation of 25 shadow franchises, to be sold off in a process managed by the Director of Passenger Rail Franchising, which specified service levels and public subsidies that were to be paid to operators. The legislation allowed BR to bid for franchises, if the DPRF agreed, but in practice he never did.

Under the original 1993 legislation, the Franchise Director set out the minimum service levels of a franchise in a Passenger Service Requirement (PSR), being the current BR timetable in the case of the first sell-offs, and put this out to competitive tender. Winning bidders were decided on a pure cost basis – those who offered to pay the highest premium, or receive lowest subsidy, would run the franchise. Once signed, franchise agreements could only be terminated under certain conditions, namely not meeting the PSR, although fines were available as an intermediate step.

The Treasury had initially envisaged franchises to be around 3 years long, to promote sustained competition, however as it became clear that potential buyers were not interested in such short terms, it was announced in 1995 that franchises would be around 5 to 7 years long, or longer if major investment was required. The first franchise agreements to be signed were for the South West and Great Western franchises, on 19 and 20 December 1995 respectively. The first passenger train service operated by a privatised franchise was the South West Trains 05:10 Twickenham to Waterloo on 4 February 1996, although this came after the first privately run service, which ironically was a rail replacement bus service covering the early morning Fishguard to Cardiff journey in South Wales, due to engineering works.

As the program progressed, all franchises had been awarded and commenced by 1 April 1997, the last being ScotRail. OPRAF was initially criticised for taking too long, but answered that most of the delays were outside of their control, and were indeed caused by the government itself. The first four franchise competitions only attracted four bidders each, well below government expectations, although competition increased as the program went on and investors gained more surety over the way the system was to operate as a whole. Ultimately, although there were 25 franchises, the eventual buyers came from only 13 different companies. Many were bus companies, with the hoped-for interest from airlines and shipping groups failing to be converted into solid bids. In addition, despite several bids, due to difficulties in raising finance, only three bids from management buyout groups had been successful.

National Express was the winner of the most franchises, with five (Gatwick Express, Midland Mainline, North London, Central Trains and ScotRail). Prism Rail came next, with four (LTS, Wales & West, Valley Lines and WAGN). Connex, Virgin Rail Group and MTL all captured two each, with the franchises they won being closely related (South Central and South Eastern for Connex, CrossCountry and West Coast for Virgin, and Mersey Electrics and North East for MTL). Stagecoach also won two, although the second was the tiny Island Line, which would eventually be merged with their main win, South West Trains. Great Western Holdings also won two, on opposite sides of the country – Great Western and North Western; FirstGroup, who had won a single franchise in Great Eastern, were a minority partner in GWH. Their March 1998 buyout of the other GWH partners increased their total to three.

In the end, most of the franchises were awarded for lengths from 7 to 7 1/2 years. Only seven franchises were longer – two for 10 years (Great Western and Midland Mainline), and five for 15 years (LTS, Gatwick Express, South Eastern, Cross Country and West Coast). Only one was shorter, the 5 year award for Island Line.

=== 1997–2005: Strategic Rail Authority ===
Rail Passengers in Great Britain from 1829 to 2021, showing the early era of small railway companies, the amalgamation into the "Big Four", nationalisation and finally the current era of privatisation

The Labour government elected in 1997 chose not to reverse the privatisation process, although they set out a number of reform proposals, including the setting up of a new Strategic Rail Authority (SRA), whose functions would absorb the responsibilities of the Franchising Director, as well as some duties previously performed by the Rail Regulator and the Department of Transport's Railways Directorate. Since this would take time as it involved legislation, in the meantime the SRA was established in 'shadow' form, in June 1999. Part of their brief was to ensure the railways operated as "a coherent network, not merely a collection of different franchises". Their goals were closely aligned with the government's wider objectives, set out in July 2000 as the ten-year plan, Transport 2010.

In 2000 the shadow SRA announced plans to use the re-franchising of the 18 shorter term (7-year) franchises expiring by 2004 to make various changes aimed at improving service grouping and lengthening franchises, with the aim of making them more robust and better able to invest in services. It aimed to have these proposals agreed by Autumn 2001, and published a timetable for the letting of 9 franchises in three tranches. These long-term plans were disrupted in 2001/2 by the impact of the Hatfield rail crash, which led to the nationalisation of Railtrack, the owner of the railway infrastructure, to create Network Rail. On 1 February 2001, the position of Franchising Director was abolished by the Transport Act 2000 and the passenger rail franchising functions were formally transferred to the SRA.

The SRA began to doubt its new long-term strategy as it failed to negotiate a 20-year franchise for the East Coast due to uncertainty over Railtack's ability to finance planned upgrades, and abandoned bidding negotiations in July 2001 after 21 months. Instead it elected for a short 2-year extension, hoping the situation would be clearer by then. Short-term extensions were also to be considered for other 7-year franchise renegotiations facing similar issues, which had not yet reached a finalised agreement.

By the end of 2002, the SRA had also changed its policy on Franchising Agreements to introduce various other performance criteria in addition to keeping to the PSR, aimed at raising the overall quality of passenger journeys. Franchise lengths would be kept to between five and eight years, but extensions would be permitted if Key Performance Indicators (KPIs) were met. It also changed the approach to risks in costs and revenues, and introduced incentive payments for performance and long-term investment. The changes took effect after the awards for the Transpennine and Wales & Borders franchises, which were already too advanced. The tendering process was also simplified, giving more details up front in order to speed up the process and make bid assessment more robust. Through the use of tactical short-term extensions, the SRA planned to achieve the changes in franchise redesign and smooth out the timetable for re-franchising, aiming for two or three awards per year.

In February 2002, the Chiltern franchise became the first to be awarded for a 20-year duration, the winning bidder being Chiltern Railways, the incumbent franchisee since privatisation.

In August 2003, FirstGroup purchased GB Railways, the first time since privatisation that a TOC had been bought by another TOC.

=== 2005–2009: Direct government responsibility ===
The Railways Act 2005 abolished the SRA and transferred the responsibility for franchises in England and Wales directly to the government through the Secretary of State for Transport, with the Welsh Government being given a direct role over services in Wales. Responsibility for the ScotRail franchise was passed to the Scottish Government. The 2005 Act also gave local and devolved administrations the ability to alter fares up or down, provided they funded the extra cost, or used the savings on other transport modes. In a move designed to make them accountable for their decisions in this new role, English passenger transport executives were no longer direct parties to franchise agreements, instead gaining a role in long-term planning and a statutory right to consultation over franchises in their areas. In London, the Act required the DfT to consult Transport for London on any franchise with services to, from or within London. In July 2007, these powers were extended, with measures designed to protect those outside London, with the DfT as the arbiter of disputes.

In October 2007, the European Union set the maximum length of a rail franchise at 22.5 years: 15 years initially, with a 50% extension in certain circumstances.

By 2007 the Labour government was happy with how the franchise system was leading to improvements in customer satisfaction and better trains, crediting TOC's use of their freedoms under the system to deliver passenger growth. The 2008 recession sparked fears over franchisees' ability to survive, although the government allayed these fears in 2009.

Passenger Rail Franchising has been examined by the National Audit Office and a report was published on 15 October 2008.

In response to continuing criticism, changes in how franchises were agreed and monitored continued; by 2010 agreements contained penalties for failure to increase reliability, and the number of KPIs had been reduced.

=== 2010–2012: Pauses and reviews ===
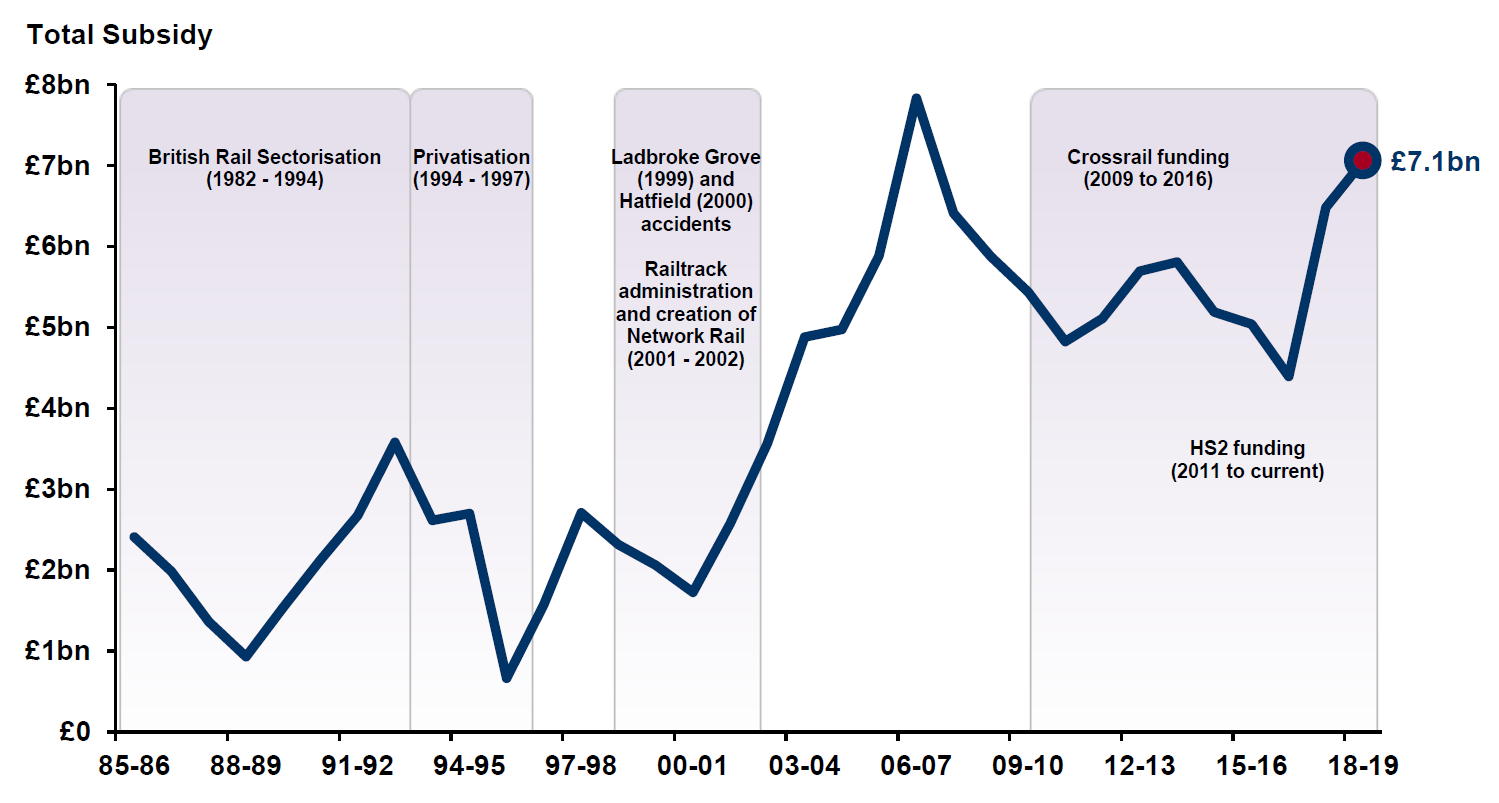
GB rail subsidy 1985–2019 in 2018 prices, showing a short decline after privatisation, followed by a steep rise following the Hatfield crash in 2000 then a further increase to fund Crossrail and HS2

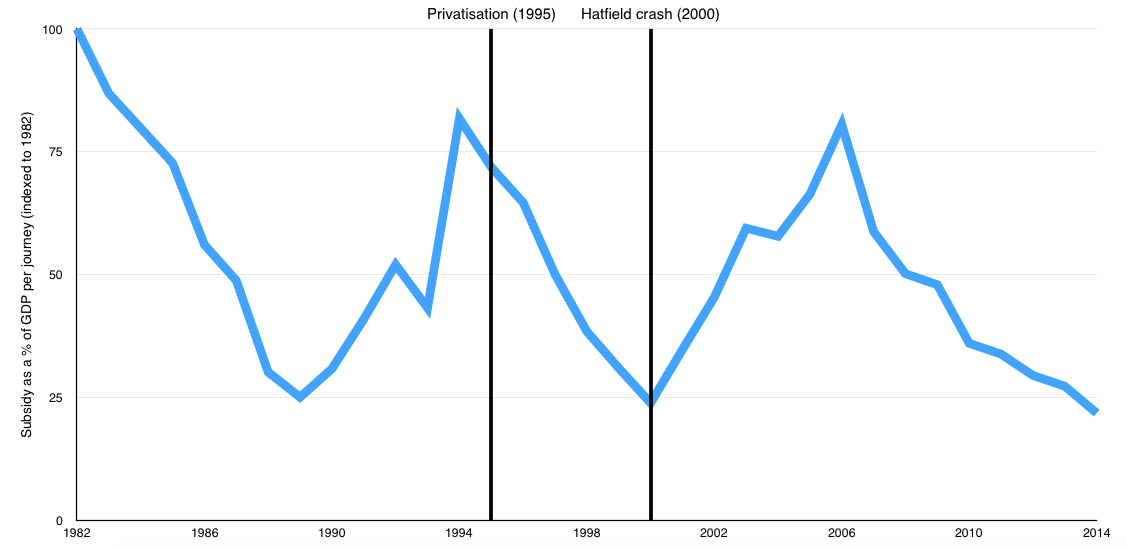
UK rail subsidy as a percentage of GDP per journey 1982–2014, indexed to 1982

The coalition government elected in May 2010 paused re-franchising pending a review, which was published in January 2011. As a result, they reformed the system further to increase operators' flexibility, with greater incentives for cost reduction by operators, and franchise terms dealt with on a case-by-case approach. They extended the standard franchise term to between 15 and 22.5 years (with shorter terms where expedient), ending the Cap and Collar approach to risk which provided for risk-sharing with government regarding future demand, and introducing profit sharing and review points. The new system, to be applied first with the InterCity West Coast bid, also took a less prescriptive approach to service specification and introduced measures to tackle crowding and changes to the way quality measurement was approached. Because of the increased future risks carried by operators, the government required a large financial surety to discourage early contract default.

In 2012 the franchising system essentially collapsed in the wake of the West Coast controversy (see below). As a result of the crisis, the government commissioned two inquiries, an inquiry to look into the cause of the West Coast failure, undertaken by Sam Laidlaw, and a review undertaken by Richard Brown of the wider franchise system. The Laidlaw report was published in December 2012, and found the DfT to be primarily responsible for the West Coast failure, having made several errors in its financial modelling. All three outstanding franchise competitions – Great Western, Essex Thameside and Thameslink – were paused pending the outcome of the Brown review. It was published in January 2013, and concluded there were no fundamental flaws in the system, but made 11 recommendations on how it could be improved. One recommendation was to spread out the re-franchising schedule to avoid bunching, which the government acted upon in committing to holding no more than four competitions per year, and staggering the East and West coast awards. Another of Brown's recommendations was the breaking up of the standard franchise period into two terms: an initial term of between 7 and 10 years, followed by an automatic extension of a further 3 to 5 years, should performance criteria have been met (but also possibly being granted if they weren't, to dissuade abuse by under-performing TOCs). It also recommended further transfer of powers to local and devolved administrations.

The West Coast controversy led to the introduction of the Direct Award concept, whereby the government can award a franchise that is up for renewal directly to the incumbent rather than through a tendering process, but only if the operator's proposed terms match the government's projected expectations of future performance based on its past record. If a reasonable contract cannot be drawn up through negotiation, the franchise is then re-let as normal. In the following few years, most franchises were renewed as Direct Awards, in part to achieve the smoothing-out of the schedule recommended by Brown.

=== 2013–2019: Direct awards ===
Following the pause for the Brown report, the system resumed in 2013; the DfT published a revised timetable in March 2013, with the first tender being concluded in May, the direct award for the Essex Thameside franchise.

In 2014, the DfT was re-organised, with responsibility for rail franchising becoming part of the new Office of Rail Passenger Services's remit under an externally recruited chief, the ORPS itself being part of a new Rail Executive within the DfT.

In January 2015, as part of its statutory duty to promote competition, the Competition & Markets Authority (CMA) launched a policy review to determine if there were opportunities to improve the current system outside the established areas of competition, namely the bidding process and the open access operators. In July 2015 it identified four possible areas for reform: an increased role for open access operators, having two successful bidders for each franchise, having more overlapping franchises and having multiple operators with licences on each route. The regulator (by then renamed the Office of Rail & Road) evaluated the CMA's options, leading to a final report in March 2016.

=== Suspension and abolition ===
In response to the COVID-19 pandemic, on 23 March 2020 the UK government took emergency measures which suspended all passenger rail franchise agreements for six months. Passenger numbers had already dropped by 70% by that date, leading to a significant drop in the income of the operating companies, which responded by cancelling and reconfiguring services. The government agreed with the companies that passengers holding advance tickets would be able to get a full refund.

Under the Emergency Measure Agreements (EMA), which were backdated to 1 March, the normal financial mechanisms of the franchise agreements were suspended so that operating companies would not get into financial difficulty. All revenue would be paid to the government, who would pay the operators' costs plus a management fee of up to 2% of their pre-pandemic costs.

In September, the government extended the EMAs by 18 months and announced plans to end the system of rail franchising, instead moving to a concession-based model, as already operated by Merseyrail, TfL Rail and London Overground. This would see all aspects of the service set by a new public body, with each operation run by a private company who would receive a fee under a management contract. In May 2021, the public body was named as Great British Railways.

On 20 September 2020, the first set of EMAs expired. They were replaced in most cases by Emergency Recovery Measures Agreements (ERMAs) with durations of between six and 18 months; under these the Department for Transport (DfT) continued to receive the revenue and pay most of the train operating companies' costs. There are some exceptions to the standard pattern:

- Two franchises had already been taken into state ownership under the operator of last resort procedure: East Coast (since 2018) and Northern (since 1 March 2020).
- Three franchises expired during 2020. Great Western and South Eastern signed new franchise agreements which run alongside their emergency agreements, and Arriva's CrossCountry franchise was extended to October 2023 under a direct award agreement. Commercial arrangements for all three are consistent with the ERMAs.

In a further move away from franchising, in December DfT agreed a directly awarded National Rail Contract with South Western Railway to run for at least two years following the end of its emergency agreement in April 2021, similarly with Avanti West Coast for at least four years from April 2022, and GWR for three years from June 2022.

- One franchise was taken into state ownership under the operator of last resort procedure in 2021: Transport for Wales Rail by the Welsh Government.
- One franchise was taken into state ownership under the same procedure later in 2021: Southeastern, owned by Govia was terminated on 16 October 2021 and transferred to Southeastern owned by Department for Transport.
- One franchise was taken into state ownership under the same procedure in 2022: after the Abellio ScotRail franchise finished at the end of March 2022, services were transferred to ScotRail, owned by the Scottish Government on 1 April 2022.
- On 28 May 2023, FirstGroup's TransPennine Express' contract was not renewed after customer complaints of poor service and a high number of train cancellations. Operator of last resort TransPennine Express took over.

=== Labour government (2024–present) ===
Following the formation of the Labour government after the July 2024 general election, it was announced that franchises would be gradually phased out as train operating companies are taken into state ownership. In November 2024, the Passenger Railway Services (Public Ownership) Act 2024 brought this into effect by amending the Railways Act 1993.

The first operators to be renationalised were South Western Railway and c2c in 2025. The process is expected to be complete in October 2027.

The new government also confirmed that they would continue with the previous Conservative government's plans to set up Great British Railways, a state-owned company that will own and manage most railway infrastructure across Great Britain, taking over from Network Rail. GBR will assume responsibility for passenger services as they return to state ownership, gradually reunifying them under one entity and reintegrating them with infrastructure management.

== Competition inquiries ==
Whenever there is a possibility through the franchising process for multiple franchises to come into the common ownership of a larger transport group, this can lead to referrals to the competition authorities for investigation (currently the Competition and Markets Authority), if it is deemed there is a concern that market dominance might result in a monopoly. This can also be triggered when there is an overlap between train and bus services in a particular area or corridor (most bus and coach services in Great Britain having been privatised in the 1980s).

Many investigations are cancelled without conclusion, simply because the concerning situation does not arise (i.e. a different company wins the bid). Investigations are also often closed with no action, after it is found there is little concern (such as in cases where the operator has little-to-no ability to create a monopoly situation in practice, even though they may control large areas of services). Where a concern is found to be significant, it is often resolved through the operators agreeing to certain undertakings designed to prevent the monopoly situation occurring, although in some cases investigations will conclude there is no alternative but to block the proposed contract.

Investigations which resulted in undertakings are as follows:

- Stagecoach / East Coast (2015)
- Arriva / Wales & Borders (2004)
- First / ScotRail (2004)
- National Express' acquisition of Prism Rail (2000)
- National Express / Midland Mainline (1996)

In February 2017 the Transport Select Committee concluded that the rail franchising model was "no longer fit for purpose" and was failing passengers, and recommended that the Transport Secretary, Chris Grayling, should instigate an independent review.

== Controversies ==
=== State/private ownership ===
According to the Railways Act 1993, the public sector cannot bid for rail franchises in Great Britain, although some rail franchises in the past have been taken on temporarily by a state-owned operation following an unsuccessful private franchise.

Some critics of the franchising system have suggested that state-owned organisations, such as the state-owned holding company set up to take temporary ownership of franchises, Directly Operated Railways, should be allowed to tender for rail franchises on a permanent basis. They highlight the fact that many of the current rail franchise holders are actually joint ventures involving subsidiary companies of the state-owned railways of other countries, such as SNCF of France or the German Deutsche Bahn.

Some commentators have criticised the re-franchising deals by comparing the performance of the private-sector franchisees unfavourably with the public-sector operators. Advocates of the franchising system contrast public-sector operations with commercial operators, citing their ability to invest private capital into the franchises, financial returns to the Treasury and customer incentives such as free on-board Wi-Fi and loyalty card schemes.

=== West Coast upgrade delay ===
In the wider context of the controversy over Railtrack's failure to upgrade the West Coast Main Line, there was criticism of the SRA for failing to ensure the Cross Country and West Coast franchises transitioned from subsidised to premium-paying franchises. This had been anticipated in the initial 15-year franchise agreement that ran from 1997 to 2012; but depended on Railtrack delivering the upgrade on time. Instead, the delays meant the contracts had to be renegotiated early as management contracts, and continued to be subsidised for several years until they could be re-let, which was seen as a cost to the public purse, adding millions to the billions run up in over-spend on the upgrade itself.

The initial management contracts came into effect on 22 July 2002, and were to see the West Coast franchise supported by the SRA until March 2003, and if agreement on a new franchise terms was not reached by then, the management contract would continue, in return for a fee of 2% of revenue. Similarly, Cross Country would be supported until March 2004, and then by a 1% fee if not renegotiated, but with the option of the SRA putting it out to tender. Unhappy with Virgin's proposal for terms of the remainder of the original 15-year Cross Country franchise, the SRA terminated negotiations on 6 August 2004 and the temporary arrangements continued until the franchise was re-let in a revised form, announced in October 2005. Although Virgin was shortlisted as a bidder for this revised franchise, it lost out to Arriva, who took over as the new franchisee from 11 November 2007.

=== West Coast re-tendering (2012) ===
In 2012 the franchising system ran into some difficulty; the Department for Transport awarded the InterCity West Coast franchise to FirstGroup, but in October the Secretary of State for Transport reversed this decision after significant technical flaws had been revealed in the way the franchise process was conducted. Virgin Trains was given a temporary management contract to run the franchise until a fresh competition could be run.

=== InterCity East Coast franchise failures ===
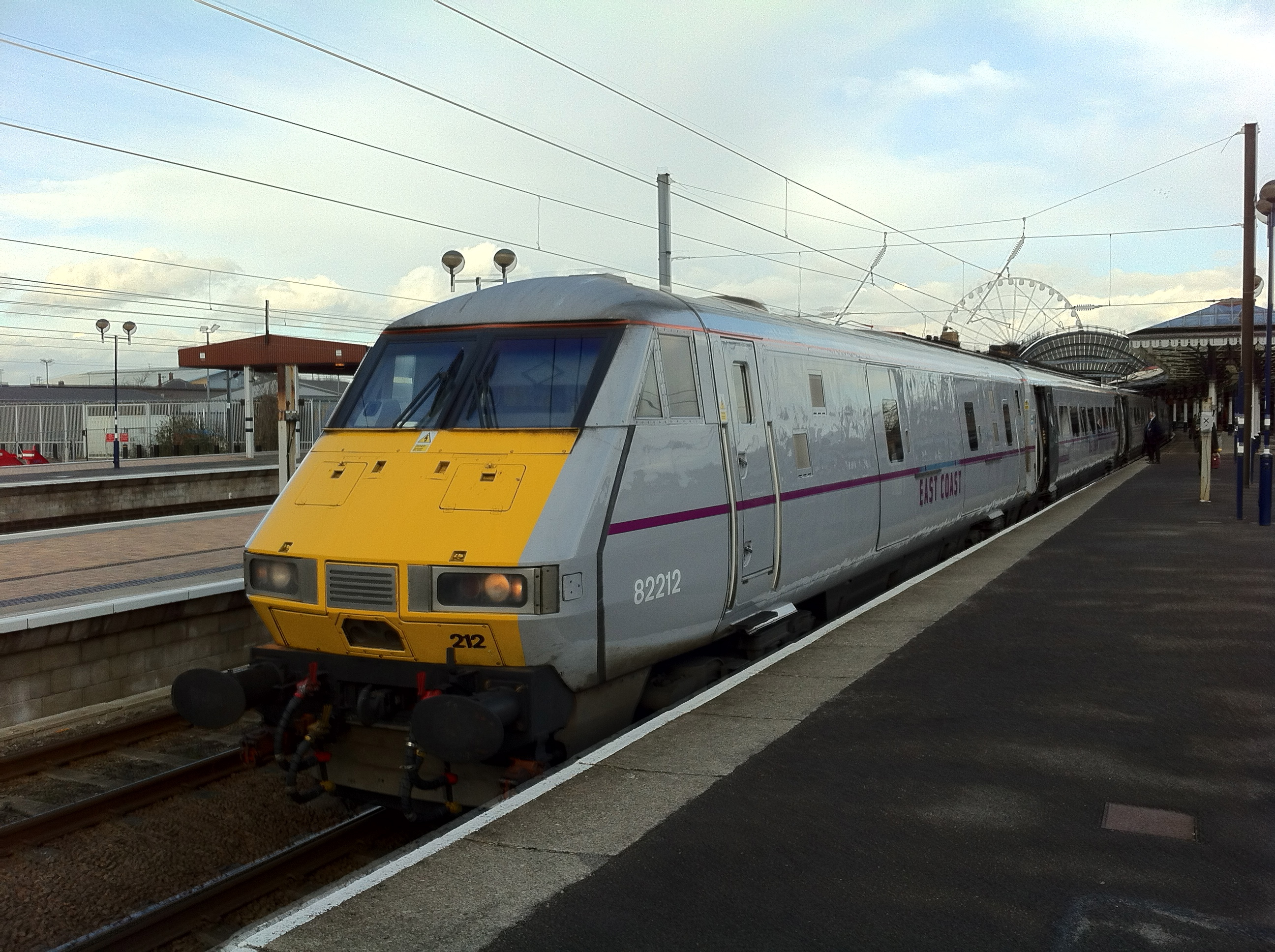
Temporary state ownership: East Coast was brought in to run the failed InterCity East Coast franchise in 2009

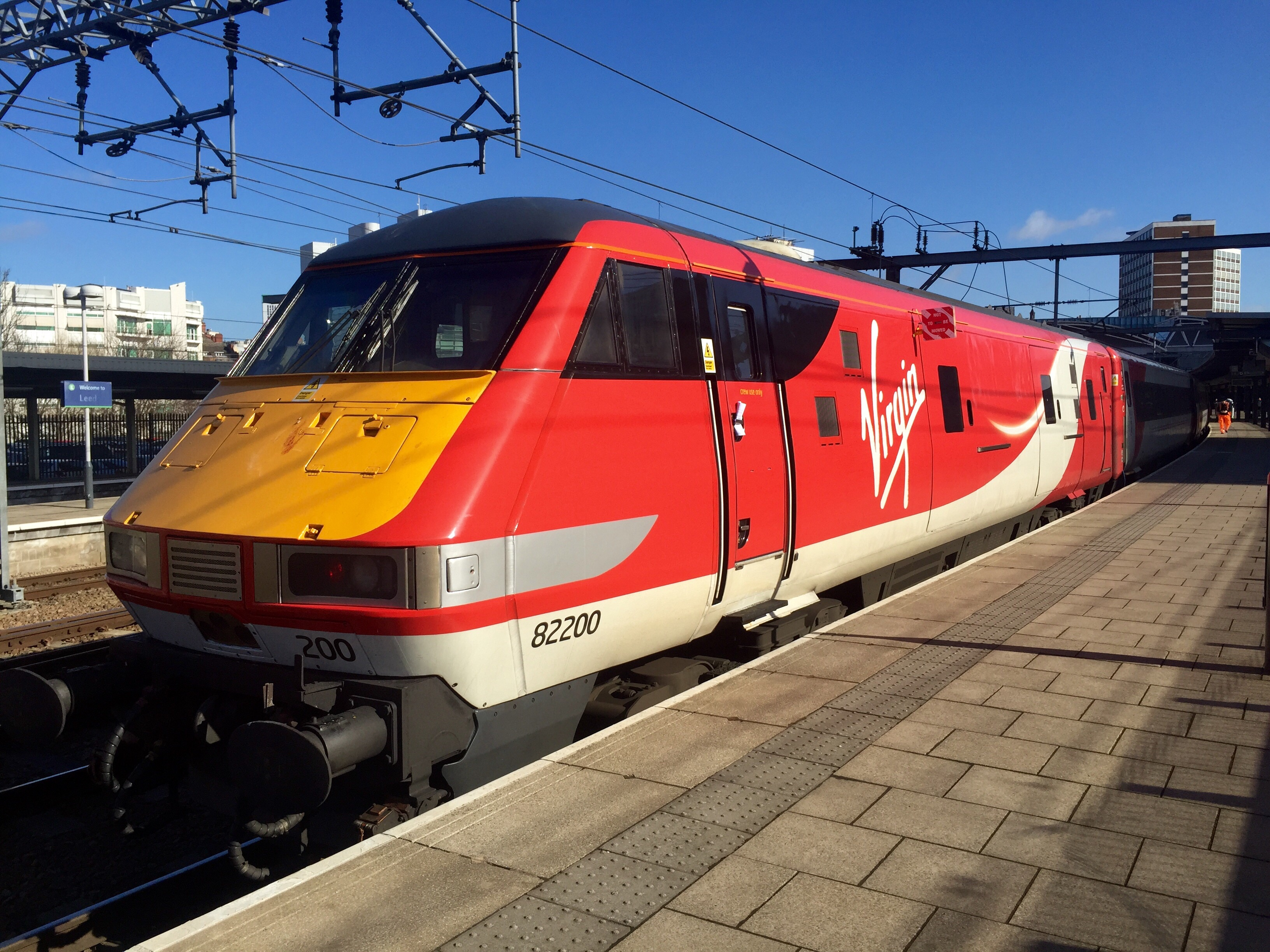
Return to private operation: Virgin Trains East Coast took over the franchise in 2015

In December 2006 Sea Containers, which had held the InterCity East Coast franchise through its Great North Eastern Railway TOC since 1996, was stripped of its contract six years before it would have expired, due to financial difficulties. The franchise was re-tendered and awarded to National Express in August 2007; GNER continued to operate the franchise on a management contract basis until December 2007, when services transferred to the new National Express East Coast TOC. By early 2009, NXEC had itself run into financial difficulties due to the recession; after the government refused to renegotiate the terms of National Express's contract, it was announced in July 2009 that the franchise would return to state ownership. Services duly transferred to the new, state-owned East Coast TOC in November 2009.

The franchise was eventually re-tendered and awarded to a joint venture between Stagecoach and Virgin in November 2014, with services transferring to the new Virgin Trains East Coast TOC in March 2015. By June 2017 VTEC, like GNER and NXEC before it, had run into financial trouble, with Stagecoach attempting to renegotiate the terms of the contract. In May 2018 it was announced that the franchise would return to state ownership again, with services duly transferring to the new, state-owned London North Eastern Railway TOC the following month.

=== Bidding process (2003) ===
The 2003 purchase of GB Railways by FirstGroup was seen by some as an attempt by First to bypass the franchising system: GB were the holders of the Anglia Railways franchise, which was being re-tendered at the time. First had already been rejected for the shortlist of three bidders, which included the incumbent. Responding to media criticism that he had been "outmanoeuvred" by First, the head of the SRA argued that he could not decide who would become a preferred bidder based on what might happen in future regarding mergers and acquisitions. The purchase went through, but GB was unsuccessful in winning the Anglia franchise, as well as two others it was bidding for (Northern and Wales & Borders).

=== Failed Network SouthCentral franchise (2003) ===
In October 2000, after passenger complaints, the SRA announced that Connex would be losing its contract to run the Network SouthCentral franchise on its expiry in 2003, which it had been operating through its Connex South Central TOC. Having announced the new operator (from 2003) would be Southern, a Govia subsidiary, the South Central TOC was sold to Govia in 2001 as a way of terminating their involvement early and cutting their losses. In November 2003, Connex was stripped of its only other UK rail operation, the Connex South Eastern TOC running the South Eastern franchise, eight years before it would have expired, due to poor financial management. It was replaced by a new, state-owned TOC, South Eastern Trains. The franchise was eventually returned to the private sector through re-tendering, which saw it pass to the Southeastern TOC April 2006 as part of the newly created Integrated Kent franchise.

== See also ==
- Campaign to Bring Back British Rail
- Financing of the rail industry in Great Britain
- History of rail transport in Great Britain 1995 to date
- Impact of the privatisation of British Rail
- List of companies operating trains in the United Kingdom
- Train operating company – includes a timeline of changes to rail franchises since 1994
