= Train operating company =

Companies operating National Rail passenger services in Great Britain

In the railway system of Great Britain, a train operating company (TOC) is a railway undertaking that operates passenger trains under the collective National Rail brand. TOCs have existed since the privatisation of the network under the Railways Act 1993.

There are two types of TOC: most hold contracts (previously franchises) let by the Department for Transport (DfT) through a tendering system, to operate services on certain routes for a specified duration, while a small number of open-access operators hold licences to provide supplementary services on chosen routes. These operators can run services for the duration of the licence validity. The franchised operators have changed considerably since privatisation: previous franchises have been divided, merged, re-let to new operators, or renamed. Some privately operated franchises have been taken over by a state-owned operator of last resort, due to failing expectations, or events on the rail system as a whole, or since 2024 the government's intention to bring passenger rail services into state ownership. As of September 2026, all Welsh and Scottish TOCs and the majority in England are state-owned.

The term is also sometimes used to describe companies operating passenger or freight rail services over tracks owned by another company or a national network owner.

== Management ==
Franchises were initially let by the Office of Passenger Rail Franchising (OPRAF). This was in turn replaced by the Strategic Rail Authority, which has since been abolished. For England, franchising is now the responsibility of the Department for Transport in the majority of cases. In Scotland, it is the responsibility of Transport Scotland. In Wales, since 2017, the responsibility for the specification and procurement of the Wales & Borders franchise belongs to Transport for Wales. In two parts of England, local government agencies are responsible: in Merseyside, the Merseyside Passenger Transport Executive lets the Merseyrail concession, while in London, Transport for London (TfL) oversees the new London Overground and Elizabeth line concessions. (Note: London Underground, a wholly owned subsidiary of TfL, operates trains nearly all on its own network serving mostly its own stations. It is not a Train Operating Company by the definition here.)

The Rail Delivery Group (RDG) (formerly the Association of Train Operating Companies) provides a commonality for the TOCs and provides some centralised co-ordination. Its activities include the provision of a national timetable and online journey planner facility, and the operation of the various Railcard discount schemes. Eurostar is also a member of the RDG, though it is not itself a TOC.

== Organisation ==
For historical and geographical reasons the railway network of the United Kingdom is split into two independent systems: one in Great Britain (including the Isle of Wight) and one in Northern Ireland, which is closely linked to the railway system of the Republic of Ireland.

=== Great Britain ===
In Great Britain, passenger train services are operated by a number of companies, referred to as Train Operating Companies or TOCs, normally on the basis of regional franchises awarded by the DfT Rail Group. Until 2005 this role was performed by the Strategic Rail Authority. The infrastructure of the railways in England, Scotland, and Wales – including tracks and signalling – is owned and operated not by the train companies but by Network Rail, which took over responsibility from Railtrack in 2002. Most passenger trains are owned by a small number of rolling stock companies (ROSCO) and are leased to the individual TOCs. However, a handful of TOCs own and maintain some of their own rolling stock. Train operating companies also operate most of the network's railway stations, in their role as Station Facility Owners (SFO), in which they lease the buildings and associated land from Network Rail. Network Rail manages some major railway stations and several stations are operated by London Underground or other companies.

Most passenger TOCs in Great Britain are privately owned. The majority of these hold franchises to operate rail services on specific parts of the railway and come under the auspices of the National Rail brand. In addition, companies are able to bid for paths (Note: Paths are specific train slots in the National Rail timetable.) to operate their own services, which the franchises do not operate; these operators are classed as open-access operators and are not franchise holders.

Currently in Great Britain, there are three open-access operators:

- Hull Trains, which runs services between London King's Cross and Hull Paragon
- Grand Central, which operates between King's Cross and Sunderland and between King's Cross and Bradford Interchange
- Lumo, which operates between King's Cross and Edinburgh Waverley / Glasgow Queen Street, as well as between Euston railway station and Stirling.

In addition, there are operators that fall outside the purview of National Rail, which operate specific services which are recent additions to Britain's railways. The main examples are Eurostar, which operates to continental Europe via the Channel Tunnel, and Heathrow Express, which runs fast services from London Paddington to Heathrow Airport.

A number of metropolitan railways on the network are operated by the local franchise holder in conjunction with the passenger transport executive or other civic body responsible for administering public transport. One of these bodies, the Merseyside Passenger Transport Executive (Merseytravel) is responsible for one of three National Rail franchises not awarded by central government, namely the Merseyrail concession, while certain National Rail services in North London came under the control of TfL in November 2007 as London Overground. Two other franchises, the Scottish national franchise, currently operated by ScotRail, and the Welsh domestic franchise, operated by Transport for Wales, are awarded by the devolved governments of the two constituent nations.

The Rail Delivery Group is the coordinating body of the TOCs in Great Britain and owns the National Rail brand; it uses the former British Rail (BR) double-arrow logo and organises the common ticketing structure. Many of the TOCs are in fact parts of larger companies that operate multiple franchises.

=== Current operators ===
Parent	Train operating companies
Arriva UK Trains	CrossCountry (XC), Grand Central (GC)
DfT Operator (Department for Transport)	c2c (CC), Chiltern Railways (CH), Greater Anglia (LE), Greater Thameslink Railway (GTR), London North Eastern Railway (GR), Northern Trains (NT), Southeastern (SE), TransPennine Express (TP), South Western Railway (SW), West Midlands Trains (LM)
FirstGroup	Avanti West Coast (VT) (70%), First Rail London (LO), Great Western Railway (GW), Hull Trains (HT), Lumo (LD/LF (Note: Lumo East Coast (King's Cross to Edinburgh / Glasgow) uses LD, whereas West Coast (Euston to Stirling) goes by LF)),
GTS Rail Operations	Elizabeth line (XR)
Scottish Rail Holdings (Scottish Government)	Caledonian Sleeper (CS), ScotRail (SR)
Serco	Merseyrail Electrics 2002 (ME) (50%)
Transport UK Group	East Midlands Railway (EM), Merseyrail Electrics 2002 (ME) (50%)
Transport for Wales (Welsh Government)	Transport for Wales Rail (AW)
Trenitalia	Avanti West Coast (VT) (30%)

=== Northern Ireland ===
The railway network in Northern Ireland is managed differently from that of the rest of the UK. The sole company that operates trains is NI Railways, which is a subsidiary of Translink, a state-owned transport corporation, which also runs the Metro buses in Belfast and Ulsterbus coaches around the country. NIR is not a TOC under the terms of the Railways Act 1993, which applies only to Great Britain. The cross-border service Enterprise (Belfast–Dublin) is jointly operated with Iarnród Éireann, the state-owned national railway company of the Republic of Ireland.

== Changes ==
Upon privatisation in 1994, the three passenger-operating sectors of BR (InterCity, Network SouthEast and Regional Railways) were divided and their existing operations were let as 25 franchises:

=== 1990–1999 ===
==== 1994 ====
The privatisation process began when BR's passenger sectors were divided into 25 train operating units which were gradually incorporated as state-owned subsidiaries of the British Railways Board. They acted as shadow franchises prior to being put to tender:

InterCity

- CrossCountry
- East Coast
- Gatwick Express
- Great Eastern
- Great Western Railway
- Midland Main Line
- West Coast

Network SouthEast

- Chiltern Lines
- Island Line
- LTS Rail
- North London Railways
- Network SouthCentral
- SouthEastern
- South Western Railway
- Thameslink
- Thames Trains
- West Anglia Great Northern

Regional Railways

- Anglia Railways
- Cardiff Railway Company
- Central Trains
- Merseyrail Electrics
- North West Regional Railways
- Regional Railways North East
- ScotRail
- South Wales & West Railway

The opening of the Channel Tunnel saw operations by Eurostar begin from Waterloo International to Paris and Brussels.

==== 1996/97 ====
The franchising process was implemented, with various private companies taking over the shadow franchises. Three were awarded to management buyouts. The Great Western Holdings' management also were awarded the North West Regional Railways franchise. The remainder were divided between a handful of major transport operators:

Initial franchisees and operating companies following British Rail privatisation
Franchise holder	Train Operating Company	Notes
Connex	Connex South Central, Connex South Eastern	
FirstBus	First Great Eastern	plus 24.5% shareholding in Great Western Holdings
GB Railways	Anglia Railways	
Go-Ahead Group	Thames Trains	Go-Ahead Group (65%), Management (35%)
Govia	Thameslink	
Great Western Holdings	Great Western Trains, North Western Trains	Management (51%), FirstBus (24.5%), 3i (24.5%)
M40 Trains	M40 Trains	Management (51%), John Laing (26%), 3i (23%)
MTL	Merseyrail Electrics, Regional Railways North East	
National Express Group	Central Trains, Gatwick Express, Midland Mainline, North London Railways, ScotRail (National Express)	
Prism Rail	LTS Rail, Valley Lines, South Wales and West Railway, West Anglia Great Northern	
Sea Containers	Great North Eastern Railway	
Stagecoach Group	Island Line Trains, South West Trains	
Virgin Rail Group	Virgin CrossCountry, Virgin West Coast	

In Northern Ireland, NIR stopped using its own branding on the Enterprise service between Belfast and Dublin, when it purchased new rolling stock in conjunction with IÉ, instead launching Enterprise as a separate brand name.

==== 1998 ====
- Great Western Holdings, which operated Great Western Trains and North West Trains, became a wholly-owned subsidiary of FirstGroup when the 24.5% shareholder bought out its partners. The TOCs were renamed First Great Western and First North Western.
- Go-Ahead Group bought the remaining 35% share in Thames Trains.
- Virgin Group sold a 49% share in Virgin Rail Group that operated the CrossCountry and West Coast franchises to Stagecoach.
- The completion of the rail link to Heathrow Airport led to Heathrow Express, an open-access operator outside the franchising system, beginning its services from London Paddington to Heathrow with operating rights until 2023.

==== 1999 ====
- The shareholdings of M40 Trains were restructured with John Laing owning 84% of the company, with the remaining 16% held by former BR managers.

=== 2000–2009 ===
==== 2000 ====
- MTL, which operated Merseyrail Electrics and Northern Spirit and Prism Rail that operated c2c (renamed from LTS Rail earlier in the year), Valley Lines Trains, Wales & West, and West Anglia Great Northern were purchased by Arriva and National Express respectively, resulting in the latter owning nine franchises. The two companies transferred to Arriva were renamed Arriva Trains Merseyside and Arriva Trains Northern.
- The first open-access operator using the National Rail brand, Hull Trains, commenced running its services between King's Cross and Hull Paragon Interchange.

==== 2001 ====
- Connex, which had operated two franchises in the south-east of England, were replaced as the operator of the Network SouthCentral franchise by Govia, which began operating it under the name South Central.
- A new franchise, the Wales & Borders franchise was created by the amalgamation of Valley Lines and the majority of services in Wales and the Borders held by Wales & West. The new franchise was initially operated under the name Wales & Borders. The remainder of Wales & West's services in the west of England were renamed Wessex Trains.

==== 2002 ====
- John Laing bought out its partners in M40 Trains.

==== 2003 ====
- Connex, having already lost the South Central franchise in 2001, was removed as franchisee of the South Eastern franchise on the grounds of poor financial management. It was replaced as the franchise holder by South Eastern Trains, a company wholly owned by the Strategic Rail Authority, which would operate the franchise until it could be tendered again.
- New franchise holder Arriva Trains Wales and new concession holder Merseyrail Electrics 2002 began operating.
- FirstGroup purchased GB Railways, which owned the Anglia Railways and Hull Trains businesses.

==== 2004 ====
- A policy where the majority of services (both long-distance and commuter) from each London terminal would all be operated by the same franchise was partially enacted. In April, One commenced operating the Greater Anglia franchise that combined the Anglia Railways and First Great Eastern franchises with the West Anglia Great Northern services radiating out from London Liverpool Street. The remainder continuing to be operated as WAGN.
- In the North of England, prior to 2004, there were two regional franchises, the North East Regional franchise and the North West Regional franchise. In 2004, these were altered into the TransPennine franchise, for inter-city services, and the Northern franchise, for local services that were awarded to First TransPennine Express and Northern Rail respectively. Some North West services were transferred to the Arriva Trains Wales franchise.
- Thames Trains was superseded by First Great Western Link and ScotRail (National Express) by First ScotRail.

==== 2005 ====
- A new operator, Heathrow Connect, jointly run by BAA and First Great Western, began operating stopping services between London Paddington and Heathrow Airport, complementing the Heathrow Express.

==== 2006 ====
Three new integrated franchises began operating in April 2006:

- First Capital Connect, began operating the Thameslink/Great Northern franchise, on the cross-London Thameslink route and suburban services from London King's Cross and London Moorgate.
- First Great Western began operating the Greater Western franchise that combined express and local services from London Paddington to the West of England by amalgamating it with First Great Western Link and Wessex Trains.
- London & South Eastern Railway commenced operating the Integrated Kent franchise taking over services from London Victoria, London Charing Cross, London Cannon Street and London Blackfriars to south-east London and Kent; responsibility for high speed domestic services operated on High Speed 1 from London St Pancras was included in the franchise.

==== 2007 ====
- The South Western franchise was created, merged with the original South West Trains franchise and Island Line Trains franchise on the Isle of Wight; it began operating in February, under the name South West Trains, with Island Line retained as a separate brand.
- In November, three new integrated franchises began operating:
  - CrossCountry, took over from Virgin CrossCountry and parts of Central Trains, and operates regional inter-city services that bypass the major London terminals.
  - East Midlands Trains replaced Midland Mainline and parts of Central Trains encompassing inter-city services from London St Pancras as well as local services in the East Midlands.
  - London Midland began operating the West Midlands franchise replaced Silverlink County and parts of Central Trains; it ran stopping services between London Euston and Northampton, in addition to local services in the West Midlands.
- In addition to these three, a further new operator, London Overground Rail Operations, took control of the routes operated by Silverlink in London, which were combined with the extended East London line in 2011. Services are controlled directly by TfL, with running of the trains themselves contracted to a private company as an operating concession. This is different from an ordinary franchise, as the train operator is not given control of the strategic aspects of the operation, such as pricing, timetabling and rolling stock procurement.
- In December, National Express East Coast took over the running of the InterCity East Coast franchise from GNER. Grand Central also began operating its services between London and Sunderland as an open-access operator.

==== 2008 ====
- In January, Laing Rail, which owned M40 Trains and a 50% shareholding in London Overground Rail Operations, was sold to Deutsche Bahn, becoming part of the DB Regio Group.
- In February, One was rebranded by National Express as National Express East Anglia to bring it into line with the East Coast franchise.
- In April, Wrexham & Shropshire began operating open-access services between Wrexham and London Marylebone.
- In June, the Gatwick Express franchise was integrated with the South Central franchise operated by Southern.

==== 2009 ====
- The government announced that National Express East Coast would have its franchise to operate inter-city services terminated, along the ECML; that the franchise would pass into the hands of state-owned company, Directly Operated Railways, which acted as the parent for East Coast.

=== 2010–2019 ===
==== 2010 ====
- Grand Central open-access services from London to Bradford Interchange began on 23 May 2010.

==== 2011 ====
- DB Regio's operations in the UK were integrated into those of Arriva following the acquisition of the latter by Deutsche Bahn in the previous year.
- Owing to continuing losses, Wrexham & Shropshire ceased operating on 28 January 2011.

==== 2012 ====
- Abellio Greater Anglia began operating the Greater Anglia franchise on 5 February 2012.
- In September, FirstGroup was awarded the right to operate the West Coast franchise, which provoked a backlash from incumbent Virgin Trains West Coast. As a result of the Department for Transport having provided incorrect information during the bid process, the offer was withdrawn in October 2012 and £40 million of bid costs were refunded.

==== 2014 ====
- In September, Govia Thameslink Railway took over services formerly operated by First Capital Connect as part of the Thameslink, Southern & Great Northern franchise and branded them as Thameslink and Great Northern. Services operated by Southern, another Govia subsidiary, were merged into the new franchise in the following year.
- Hull Trains became a wholly-owned subsidiary of FirstGroup, when the 80% shareholder bought out its partners.

==== 2015 ====
- In March, a Stagecoach and Virgin joint venture, trading as Virgin Trains East Coast, commenced operating the InterCity East Coast franchise.
- In April, the ScotRail franchise was split with the Caledonian Sleeper services becoming a stand-alone franchise operated by Serco while the remaining services remained as the Abellio ScotRail franchise.
- In May, a number of metro routes run by Abellio Greater Anglia from London Liverpool Street were transferred to TfL to run as a concession similar to both London Overground and Crossrail (under the name, TfL Rail). The routes transferred were those to Shenfield, Enfield Town, Chingford, Cheshunt, Romford and Upminster.

==== 2016 ====
- In April, FirstGroup trading as TransPennine Express commenced operating the TransPennine Express in its own right, previously having done so in a joint venture with Keolis. On the same date, Arriva Rail North commenced operating the Northern franchise.
- In November, Arriva Rail London took over the London Overground concession from London Overground Rail Operations.

==== 2017 ====
- In February, National Express sold its subsidiary c2c to Trenitalia.
- In March, Abellio sold a 40% share in Abellio Greater Anglia to Mitsui.
- In August, a FirstGroup/MTR joint venture trading as South Western Railway commenced operating the South Western franchise.
- In December, an Abellio, East Japan Railway Company and Mitsui joint venture, trading as West Midlands Trains, commenced operating the West Midlands franchise.

==== 2018 ====
- In May, the Government announced that Virgin Trains East Coast's contract would be terminated early due to financial difficulties. In June 2018, the company was replaced by the state-owned operator of last resort London North Eastern Railway.
- In May, TfL Rail took over the Heathrow Connect services, which led to the introduction of Oyster and Contactless payment to Heathrow Airport for the first time on National Rail.
- In October, Transport for Wales took over the Wales & Borders franchise from Arriva Trains Wales.

==== 2019 ====
- In August, East Midlands Railway took over the East Midlands franchise from East Midlands Trains.
- In December, Avanti West Coast began operating the new West Coast Partnership replacing Virgin Trains.

=== 2020 onwards ===
==== 2020 ====
- On 1 March, operation of the Northern franchise transferred from Arriva Rail North to the UK state-owned Northern Trains.
- The UK government took emergency action to support train operating companies by assuming their financial risks; this was because the COVID-19 pandemic caused passenger numbers to reduce to near zero. TOCs were not allowed to make timetable or staffing changes without government approval. The Office for National Statistics reclassified the companies as public non-financial corporations so borrowing and employees are counted in the public-sector. They were viewed as effectively temporarily renationalised.

==== 2021 ====
- On 7 February, the day-to-day operations of the Wales & Borders franchise were transferred to the Welsh state-owned operator of last resort, Transport for Wales Rail, a subsidiary of Transport for Wales.
- On 17 October, the South Eastern franchise was taken over from London & South Eastern Railway by government-owned operator of last resort Southeastern.
- On 25 October, Lumo commenced operating open-access services on the East Coast Main Line between London King's Cross and Edinburgh.

==== 2022 ====
- On 1 April, ScotRail, owned by Scottish Rail Holdings for the Scottish Government, commenced operating the ScotRail franchise.
- On 24 May, TfL Rail, operated by MTR, was rebranded as Elizabeth line, following the opening of the core section between Paddington and Abbey Wood.
- In December, Grand Union, an open-access operator, was authorised by the Office of Rail and Road to operate trains between London Paddington and Carmarthen starting in December 2024.

==== 2023 ====
- On 28 May, after months of continued cancellations and service disruptions, FirstGroup's TransPennine Express contract was not renewed. DfT OLR Holdings's TransPennine Express took over the service.
- On 25 June, Scottish Rail Holdings took over the Caledonian Sleeper service from Serco.

==== 2024 ====
- In December, after the Starmer government passed legislation to renationalise passenger rail in Great Britain, the government announced that all operators would be taken back into state ownership, starting with three in 2025.

==== 2025 ====
- On 25 May, First MTR South Western Trains Limited's contract expired and it was taken over by DfT Operator, the new name for DfT OLR Holdings. The new nationalised operator is also trading as South Western Railway.
- On 20 July, c2c services were taken over by the DfT Operator subsidiary operator of the same name.
- On 12 October, Greater Anglia services were taken over by the DfT Operator subsidiary operator of the same name.

==== 2026 ====
- On 1 February, West Midlands Trains services were taken over by the DfT Operator subsidiary operator of the same name.
- On 3 May, First Rail London took over from Arriva Rail London as the operator of London Overground services.
- On 31 May, DfT Operator company Greater Thameslink Railway took over from Govia Thameslink Railway as the operator of the Thameslink, Southern, Great Northern, and Gatwick Express services.
- On 20 September, Chiltern Railways services were taken over by the DfT Operator subsidiary operator of the same name.

== Railtours ==
The privatisation of British Rail allowed the introduction of open-access operators, in which companies, upon payment of a fee, could purchase individual slots on the main line. This has led to the growth in companies offering charter trains, and to the railtour. Most railtour operators run services in part of the country; however, there are a handful that operate services nationwide. Usually, these will see a train made up of ex-BR rolling stock pulled by a hired locomotive from one of the freight companies. Occasionally, a preserved ex-BR heritage railway locomotive that is certified to run on the main line will be made available for such charters.

== Sea links ==
A number of coastal railway stations in the United Kingdom serve to provide connections to ferry services to a number of destinations. Most of the ferry operators in these cases set their timetable to run in conjunction with the arrivals and departures of rail services from the stations serving the ferry terminals. A handful of these even offer integrated pricing for both rail and ferry travel because the Island Line is part of the National Rail network, passengers can purchase tickets for travel to any of the stations on the Isle of Wight from any other station in Great Britain. This ticket also covers the cost of passage on the Wightlink catamaran from Portsmouth Harbour to Ryde Pier Head. It is also possible to purchase ferry inclusive tickets from any station in Great Britain to Cowes or East Cowes on the Isle of Wight using Red Funnel ferries, although there are no rail connections from these towns.

== International operators ==
There are two main international services which operate on the railways in the United Kingdom:

- Eurostar – runs between London St Pancras, Paris Gare du Nord, Brussels-Midi and Amsterdam Centraal through the Channel Tunnel.
- Enterprise – operates on the Irish network between Belfast Grand Central and Dublin Connolly.

A third service is Dutchflyer (GoLondon in the Netherlands). This is not a separate rail service, but a collaboration between Greater Anglia, Stena Line and Nederlandse Spoorwegen to provide an integrated rail/sea/rail service between eastern England (London Liverpool Street, Cambridge, Norwich) and Amsterdam Centraal using a single ticket.

A further international service is provided by Venice Simplon Orient Express. Although this is primarily a railtour operator with special trains to various locations in the United Kingdom, it also operates the scheduled Orient Express service to destinations in Europe. This involves two separate trains; the Belmond British Pullman departs from London Victoria and terminates at Folkestone West, where passengers transfer by coach through the Channel Tunnel to Calais; at Gare de Calais-Ville, they then join the Orient Express which then calls at various destinations including Paris, Vienna, Innsbruck, Venice and Rome.

== In other countries ==
The differentiation between train operating companies and railway infrastructure companies was enforced by European Union legislation and can be found in all EU member countries.

In Germany, train operating companies (Eisenbahnverkehrsunternehmen – EVU) are defined by General Railways Act 1993, s. 2(1) (Allgemeines Eisenbahngesetz (AEG), enacted 27 December 1993) as companies providing train services. They are distinct from Eisenbahninfrastrukturunternehmen (EIU), which own and maintain the railway infrastructure. While there are many private EVU, that have obtained regional franchises, only a handful of long-distance EVU exist (the largest by fare being DB Fernverkehr); the infrastructure is also almost completely owned by Deutsche Bahn subsidiaries.

== See also ==
- List of companies operating trains in the United Kingdom
- Rail Delivery Group
- Rail transport in Great Britain
- Rail transport in Ireland.
