= SNC-Lavalin Rail & Transit =

British rail industry consultancy company

- Formerly: Interfleet Technology
- Industry: Rail Industry and business services
- Founded: April 1994
- Headquarters: Pride Park, Derby, England
- Key people: Richard George
- Products: Rolling Stock, Infrastructure, Rail Control Systems, Transport Advisory
- Number of employees: 1,000+ (2015)
- Parent: AtkinsRéalis

SNC-Lavalin Rail & Transit is an international rail consultancy company. Headquartered in Derby, England, it is a subsidiary of AtkinsRéalis.

The company was originally formed as Interfleet Technology in April 1994 during the privatization of British Rail. Initially operating as a subsidiary of the British Railways Board, Interfleet became an independent entity following a management buyout in 1996. By 2011, the company had expanded to 22 offices worldwide and generated a turnover exceeding £50 million, engaging in thousands of assignments annually.

In 2011, SNC-Lavalin acquired Interfleet, leading to its rebranding as SNC-Lavalin Rail & Transit in January 2016. The company now has regional subsidiaries in the United Kingdom, North America, Scandinavia, and Australasia, with offices in several major cities globally.

SNC-Lavalin Rail & Transit offers a comprehensive range of services across the railway system, including rolling stock, infrastructure, signalling, communications, testing, and software development. Their clients span governmental and regulatory agencies, private manufacturers, operators, and investors. Notable projects include high-speed freight wagon design, modifications to British Rail Class units, technical analysis for Norwegian high-speed railways, and significant roles in the UK's InterCity East Coast franchise and Australia's Inland Rail programme.

== History ==
=== Formation and early years ===
Interfleet Technology was formed during April 1994 as part of the wider privatisation of British Rail. Interfleet originated from the former InterCity Fleet Engineering division of the British Rail engineering and technical headquarters, which managed the rolling stock operated by the then InterCity sector of British Rail. Between April 1994 and March 1996, the company traded as a subsidiary of the British Railways Board; however, in March 1996, Interfleet was privatised in a management buyout.

At the time of privatisation, Interfleet employed 99 staff and had one office in Derby; turnover was approximately £5 million. Having opted to pursue international clients, Interfleet established a series of regional offices for the purpose of supporting the individual needs of local markets, providing their services as consultants and subject experts. Interlink's day-to-day operations emphasised the speed and effectiveness of communication with its varied client base.

By April 2011, Interfleet had expanded considerably, totaling 22 offices spread across the globe, and was reportedly generating a turnover in excess of £50 million. According to David Rollin (the Managing Director of Interfleet at the time), the company was engaged in excess of two thousand assignments per year on behalf of various clients at this time.

=== Acquisition and rebranding as SNC-Lavalin Rail & Transit ===
During October 2011, it was announced that Interfleet would be acquired by SNC-Lavalin.

During May 2013, it was announced that Interfleet had been appointed to provide various services for the Intercity Express Programme, including direct technical support to Hitachi, assessment and certification services for compliance to relevant European and British legislation, as well as inspections and a production quality management audit in both Britain and Japan.

In January 2016, Interfleet Technology was re-branded as SNC-Lavalin Rail & Transit. In conjunction with this rebranding, it was also integrated with other entities, including SNC-Lavalin's Transit Engineers in Vancouver and Toronto along with the Transport Systems team in Montreal; these became a single organisation that operated under the new brand.

=== Former logo ===
The company logo for Interfleet has also changed throughout its history as shown below.

Original Logo	Most recent Logo

== Organisational structure and regional offices ==
The international SNC-Lavalin Rail & Transit divisional unit has regional subsidiaries in the United Kingdom, North America, Scandinavia and Australasia. The divisional unit has offices in Australia (Brisbane, Melbourne, Perth and Sydney), Canada (Burlington, Montreal, Toronto & Vancouver), Malaysia (Kuala Lumpur), Norway (Oslo), Sweden (8 locations including Gothenburg, Malmö and Stockholm), the United Kingdom (Derby (HQ)), Edinburgh, Glasgow, Birmingham, London and Manchester) and the United States (Philadelphia & New York City) and 1,000 staff.

== Service areas ==
SNC-Lavalin Rail & Transit provides services across the railway system, the major elements of which include rolling stock, infrastructure, signalling, communications, testing, and software development. The company works throughout all stages of the asset lifecycle, from feasibility, specification and procurement, through operations, maintenance and renewal. Services offered range from strategic railway management through to engineering and detail technical services.

== Clients and assignments ==
The company operates within the global rail industry, serving governmental and regulatory agencies, private manufacturers, maintainers, operators, and others. Its work encompasses daily engineering and technical support, management of major projects like new train procurement, and providing strategic support to bidders for passenger rail franchises.

During the early 2000s, the company provided testing in conjunction with the KTH Royal Institute of Technology into the design of high speed freight wagons suitable for speeds of up to 160km/h. Around the same timeframe, Interfleet also shaped the bogie design of the new British Rail Class 185 diesel multiple unit; roughly one decade later, it designed the modifications for the mid-life refreshes of the similar British Rail Class 444 and British Rail Class 450 electric multiple units.

During September 2010, Interfleet was appointed to perform technical and safety analysis in support of the design of envisioned high speed railways being planned in Norway.

During November 2015, SNC-Lavalin Rail & Transit, in partnership with Arup Group and Ernst & Young, was appointed by the Department for Transport as its operator of last resort to take over the operations of any train operating company in the United Kingdom at short notice should it be required. This function had previously been handled by Directly Operated Railways. In June 2018, the partnership trading as London North Eastern Railway took over the InterCity East Coast franchise from Virgin Trains East Coast.

During the late 2010s and early 2020s, SNC-Lavalin Rail & Transit has been heavily involved in Australia's Inland Rail programme; activities have included project management and the production of a framework for information management, contract compliance and resource management.

By late 2021, the company had secured a key role in European Train Control System (ETCS) deployment in Britain, providing both consultancy and signalling systems integrator functions; it has also been appointed as the Railway Systems Integration Partner for the East Coast Digital Programme as well as to deliver and operate the National ETCS Test Verification Validation and Integration Laboratory.
