= Richard Brown (transport executive) =

British transport executive (born 1953)

Richard Brown CBE FCILT FRSA DL
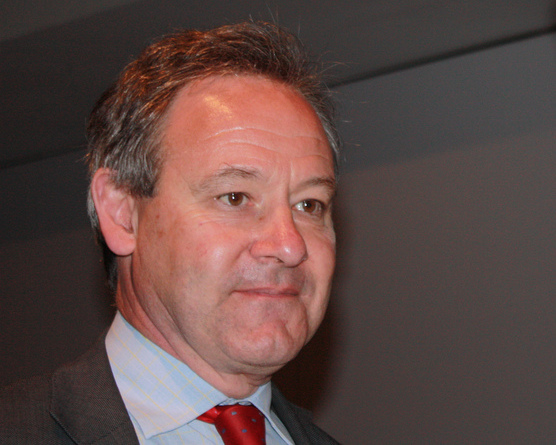
- Born: Richard Howard Brown; 23 February 1953 (age 73)
- Occupation: Transport executive
- Years active: 1970s–
- Spouse: Gweno L. Brown
- Children: 2 daughters, 1 son

Richard Howard Brown CBE FCILT FRSA DL (born 23 February 1953) is a British transport executive. Until 30 June 2013 he was the chairman of Eurostar International Limited, having previously been Eurostar UK Ltd's chief executive between August 2002 and April 2010.

Brown was chair of the Association of Train Operating Companies (ATOC) in both 2000 and 2001. He previously worked in British Rail's freight business, migrating to BR's InterCity Planning division. He was heavily involved with BR's "Organising For Quality" project which divided British Rail into separate businesses. With that Brown headed up the combined InterCity Cross Country and Midland Mainline. Brown moved to Derby and continued as the head of Midland Mainline before, during and after the privatisation of British Rail. The franchise win by National Express led to Brown becoming head of its new rail unit, and a commercial director of NEG itself.

Brown was president of the Chartered Institute of Logistics and Transport for one year, having taken over at the end of May 2008. He was appointed to the board of High Speed Two Ltd in 2012, where he has served as the chair of the remuneration committee since July 2012.

During late 2012, Brown was commissioned to undertake an independent review of the system of rail franchising in Great Britain for the United Kingdom's Department for Transport, which was published in January 2013. Brown was later appointed as a non-executive member to the board of the Department for Transport for a three-year period beginning on 15 July 2013. In June 2015, Brown was made a special director of Network Rail, reporting directly to Secretary of State for Transport Patrick McLoughlin.

== Personal life ==
Richard Brown met his wife Gweno on a skiing trip and they have three grown-up children: two daughters and one son. He lives in Littleover, Derby, and commutes weekly to a flat in London.

Brown studied philosophy and engineering at the University of Cambridge, received an MPhil in town and transport planning from University College London, and later studied at Harvard University. He received an honorary doctorate from the University of Derby in 2008. In the Queen's Birthday Honours 2007, Brown was appointed as a Commander of the Order of the British Empire for services to transport.

== Rail franchising ==
During late 2012, Brown was commissioned to undertake an independent review of the system of rail franchising for the Department for Transport. This was published in January 2013 as "The Brown Review of the Rail Franchising Programme". The report noted that "in a well-functioning, good franchise system you sometimes have failure", but that a number of procedural faults made failure more likely. Among other recommendations, the report stated that franchisees should (only) be responsible for the risks they can manage, and that "macroeconomic, or exogenous, revenue risk" should not be passed on to franchisees.
