= Operator of last resort =

Government business that runs a previously private railway franchise

An operator of last resort was a term for a business in the United Kingdom that operated a railway franchise on behalf of the government when a train operating company (TOC) was no longer able to do so, and was nationalised on an interim basis. In December 2024, following new legislation in November, it was announced that the first of the remaining contracted TOCs would be taken back into public ownership in May 2025.

== Purpose ==
Under the Railways Act 1993, which privatised passenger operations in the United Kingdom, the government was required to maintain continuity of passenger rail services when a franchise was terminated. In some instances, the government negotiated for the existing franchisee to continue to operate the franchise on a management contract until it could be re-let, as happened when GNER defaulted on the InterCity East Coast franchise in 2007.

Should that not be possible, the Department for Transport (DfT) in England (through DfT Operator), the Scottish Government (through Scottish Rail Holdings) for the ScotRail franchise in Scotland, and the Welsh Government for the Wales & Borders franchise in Wales, were required to step in as operators of last resort.

== Structure ==
In July 2009, the DfT established Directly Operated Railways (DOR) as its operator of last resort for England. In November 2015, the DfT wound up DOR and appointed a partnership of Arup Group, Ernst & Young and SNC-Lavalin Rail & Transit.

== Utilisation ==
Between the privatisation of British Rail in the mid-1990s and the creation of Great British Railways in 2024, there were nine occasions when an operator of last resort was appointed, five of them after the start of the COVID-19 pandemic. In December 2024, the UK government announced plans to hand over three more services to the operator of last resort in 2025, with an expectation that the handover of all train operating companies' services, excluding open-access operators, would be completed by October 2027.

== Operators of last resort ==
=== Before 2018 ===
- South Eastern Trains operated the South Eastern franchise from 2003 to 2006 after the Connex South Eastern franchise was terminated by the Strategic Rail Authority.
- East Coast operated the InterCity East Coast franchise from 2009 to 2015 after National Express East Coast defaulted.

=== 2018–2020 ===
- London North Eastern Railway has operated the InterCity East Coast franchise since 2018, after Virgin Trains East Coast defaulted.
- Northern Trains has operated the Northern franchise since 1 March 2020, after the Arriva Rail North franchise was terminated by the Department for Transport.

=== 2021–2023 ===
- Transport for Wales Rail has been the Welsh Government's operator of last resort since 7 February 2021, after the Wales & Borders franchise operated by KeolisAmey Wales became nonviable as a result of the COVID-19 pandemic.
- Southeastern has operated the South Eastern franchise since 17 October 2021, after the previous Govia-owned operator London & South Eastern Railway was stripped of the franchise for not declaring £25 million of revenue.
- ScotRail, controlled by Scottish Rail Holdings for Transport Scotland, has run the ScotRail franchise since 1 April 2022, after Transport Scotland announced that Abellio ScotRail's seven-year contract was to be terminated early because of poor performance.
- TransPennine Express took over from First TransPennine Express on 28 May 2023 after the DfT terminated the contract on the grounds of poor service.
- Scottish Rail Holdings took over Caledonian Sleeper from the incumbent operator, Serco, on 25 June 2023.

=== 2024–2027 ===
- South Western Railway took over from First MTR South Western Trains Limited on 25 May 2025.
- c2c took over from Trenitalia c2c Limited (which was originally known as LTS Rail) on 20 July 2025 after its franchise was replaced by a rail contract four years prior.
- Greater Anglia (GA Trains Limited) took over from Transport UK East Anglia Limited (which was owned by Transport UK Group and Mitsui & Co.) on 12 October 2025.
- Greater Thameslink Railway took over from Govia Thameslink Railway on 31 May 2026.
- Chiltern Railways took over from the previous operator of the same name (owned by Arriva UK Trains) on 20 September 2026.

== Remaining companies ==
- Avanti West Coast – Operated by FirstGroup and Trenitalia; to be nationalised on 7 March 2027.
- CrossCountry – Operated by Arriva UK Trains; to be nationalised by October 2027.
- East Midlands Railway – Operated by Transport UK Group. The contract ends on 18 October 2030, however it is expected to be nationalised by the end of 2027.
- Great Western Railway – Operated by FirstGroup; to be nationalised on 13 December 2026.
- Merseyrail – Operated by Serco/Transport UK Group; to be nationalised in 2028
