= DfT Operator =

UK state-owned rail holding company

DfT Operator Limited
- Logo of DfT Operator Limited
- Type: State-owned holding company
- Industry: Rail transport
- Predecessor: Directly Operated Railways
- Founded: 24 May 2018; 8 years ago
- Defunct: By October 2027; 10 months' time
- Successor: Great British Railways
- Headquarters: London, England
- Area served: England
- Key people: Andrew Haines (Chairman); Alex Hynes (CEO)
- Services: Train operating company; Operator of last resort; Rail franchise; Public transport; Passenger rail
- Revenue: ▲£3.8 billion (2025)
- Operating income: ▼£27.0 million (2025)
- Net income: ▼£19.5 million (2025)
- Number of employees: ▲16,976 (2025)
- Parent: Department for Transport
- Subsidiaries: London North Eastern Railway; Northern Trains; Southeastern; TransPennine Express; South Western Railway; c2c; Greater Anglia; West Midlands Trains; Greater Thameslink Railway; Chiltern Railways
- Website: www.gov.uk/government/organisations/dft-operator-limited

DfT Operator Limited (DFTO) is a British state-owned holding company established in 2018 as DfT OLR Holdings Limited by the Department for Transport (DfT). It was created to act as the operator of last resort for rail franchises in England, taking over train operating companies (TOC) that were either failing, or being returned to state ownership at the end of their contract terms.

DFTO's role has significantly expanded since its inception, particularly following the passage of the Passenger Railway Services (Public Ownership) Act 2024, which enabled the government to assume ownership of passenger rail services without buying out private contracts. Under this framework, the government has announced that it will not renew or extend existing private rail operating contracts, instead transferring services to DFTO as they expire. This policy forms part of the Labour Party's commitment to renationalise passenger rail, a key pledge of its 2024 general election manifesto.

Acting under the direction of DfT, as of September 2026 DFTO owns ten TOCs, making it the largest operator of passenger rail services in Britain by passenger revenue and mileage, being responsible for over four in ten passenger journeys. It is expected to play a transitional role in the government's long-term rail strategy, ahead of the launch of Great British Railways, a planned public body that will integrate both operations and infrastructure across the national network. It is expected that all TOCs will be in state ownership by the end of 2027.

== History ==
=== 2018–2023: Establishment as operator of last resort ===
DfT OLR Holdings Limited was incorporated in May 2018 by the Department for Transport (DfT) as a state-owned holding company to enable the UK Government to take control of passenger rail services in England where a franchise contract was either terminated or not renewed. It succeeded Directly Operated Railways, which had carried out the same function between 2009 and 2015 when it operated the InterCity East Coast franchise; that company was wound up after the route was re-franchised, leaving the government without a standing operator of last resort structure until the creation of DfT OLR Holdings. Through DfT OLR Holdings, the DfT manages train operating companies that are placed into public control.

The model was first used on 24 June 2018, when London North Eastern Railway replaced Virgin Trains East Coast following the early termination of the InterCity East Coast franchise due to financial difficulties. On 1 March 2020 the DfT transferred the Northern Trains operation into operator of last resort management, replacing Arriva Rail North after a period of sustained performance issues and financial instability. This was followed on 17 October 2021 by the transfer of Southeastern after the discovery that the incumbent operator had failed to declare significant revenue to the department, constituting a breach of its franchise agreement. A further transfer took place on 28 May 2023, when TransPennine Express was placed under operator of last resort management after the DfT decided not to renew the FirstGroup contract following prolonged service cancellations and poor performance.

By mid-2023, the four operators managed through DfT OLR Holdings made the company the third-largest passenger rail operator in Great Britain by revenue and the largest by passenger mileage, accounting for 23% of passenger revenue and 26% of passenger kilometres.

=== 2024–present: Expansion and role in public ownership ===
Following the 2024 United Kingdom general election, the Labour Party formed a government with a manifesto commitment to renationalise the railways. This was to be implemented through two pieces of legislation, the Passenger Railway Services (Public Ownership) Act 2024 which empowered the government to take over passenger rail services as contracts expired and made the government the preferred operator of rail services and a forthcoming Railways Bill which would bring the existing train operating companies together with Network Rail into a single state-owned body, Great British Railways.

The Passenger Railway Services (Public Ownership) Bill was introduced to Parliament in July 2024 by then Secretary of State for Transport Louise Haigh. The bill subsequently passed Parliament later in 2024. Following its passage the Department for Transport announced that DfT OLR Holdings Limited would be renamed DfT Operator Limited, reflecting its expanded role as the government's primary operator of passenger rail services returned to public ownership.

The government chose to allow private operating contracts to expire rather than buying them out, enabling services to transfer into public ownership at no cost to the government. The first operators announced for transfer under this policy were South Western Railway, which transferred on 25 May 2025, c2c, which transferred on 20 July 2025, and Greater Anglia, which transferred on 12 October 2025.

In November 2025, the Secretary of State for Transport Heidi Alexander introduced the Railways Bill to Parliament as part of the government's wider rail reform to establish DFT's future successor, Great British Railways. Around the same time, Alex Hynes was appointed chief executive of DFTO, succeeding Robin Gisby, to oversee the organisation's expansion and its transition into Great British Railways. In addition, around 200 staff from the Department for Transport were scheduled to transfer into DFTO by April 2026.

Further transfers to DFTO took place in 2026, beginning with West Midlands Trains on 1 February, followed by Greater Thameslink Railway on 31 May and Chiltern Railways on 20 September. All three operators transferred into public ownership following the expiry of their contracts. Great Western Railway is scheduled to follow suit on 13 December 2026.

The remaining privately operated train operating companies, Avanti West Coast, East Midlands Railway and CrossCountry, are expected to transfer into public ownership during 2027 as their contracts expire.

== Train operating companies ==
Train operating companies owned by DfT Operator
Operator	Period under DFTO		Takeover reason	Reference
Operator	Takeover	Duration	Takeover reason	Reference
London North Eastern Railway	24 June 2018	8 years, 4 months and 15 days	Early termination following financial difficulties	
Northern Trains	1 March 2020	6 years, 8 months and 7 days	Contract terminated due to poor performance	
Southeastern	17 October 2021	5 years and 22 days	Contract terminated following financial misconduct	
TransPennine Express	28 May 2023	3 years, 5 months and 11 days	Contract not renewed due to poor performance and service disruption	
South Western Railway	25 May 2025	1 year, 5 months and 14 days	Contract period ended	
c2c	20 July 2025	1 year, 3 months and 19 days	Contract period ended	
Greater Anglia	12 October 2025	1 year and 27 days	Contract period ended	
West Midlands Trains	1 February 2026	9 months and 7 days	Contract period ended	
Greater Thameslink Railway	31 May 2026	5 months and 8 days	Contract period ended	
Chiltern Railways	20 September 2026	1 month and 19 days	Contract period ended	

== See also ==
- Scottish Rail Holdings
- Transport for Wales
