= South Western franchise =

Railway franchise in the UK

South Western
- Operator: South Western Railway
- Main Routes: South West Main Line; Portsmouth Direct Line; West of England Main Line; Waterloo to Reading Line
- Fleet: 367
- Stations called at: 213
- Stations operated: 185
- Dates of operation: 4 February 1996 – 31 January 2004; 1 February 2004 – 3 February 2007; 4 February 2007 – 19 August 2017; 20 August 2017 – 25 May 2025

Other
- Website: www.southwesternrailway.com
Route map

South Western was a railway franchise for the provision of passenger services from London Waterloo to destinations in Surrey, Hampshire, Somerset, Dorset, Berkshire, Wiltshire and Devon on the South West, Portsmouth Direct and West of England main lines. In 2007, the franchise was combined with the smaller franchise for the Island Line on the Isle of Wight.

== History ==
=== South West Trains ===
In December 1995, the Director of Passenger Rail Franchising awarded the franchise to South West Trains, a subsidiary of Stagecoach. Operations started on 4 February 1996.

In April 2001, the Strategic Rail Authority (SRA) awarded Stagecoach a new franchise after it beat bids from FirstGroup/NedRailways and Sea Containers. The 2001 franchises awarded were (as promulgated) to run for 20 years, but in 2002 the SRA reduced the duration of franchises and South West Trains was awarded a three-year franchise starting on 1 February 2004.

In December 2005, the Department for Transport (DfT) announced that Arriva, FirstGroup, MTR/Sea Containers, National Express and Stagecoach had been shortlisted to tender for the new South Western franchise, which combined the South West Trains and Island Line Trains franchises, both being operated by Stagecoach. National Express and MTR/Sea Containers later withdrew. In September 2006, the DfT awarded the franchise to Stagecoach commencing on 4 February 2007 for a period of ten years.

In March 2013, the Secretary of State for Transport announced the DfT were in talks with Stagecoach to extend the franchise until April 2019. However, after failing to negotiate an extension, in July 2015 the DfT announced the franchise would be relet.

=== South Western Railway ===
In February 2016, the DfT announced FirstGroup and Stagecoach had been shortlisted to bid for the next franchise. In June 2016, MTR took a 30% shareholding in the FirstGroup bid.

In July 2016, the DfT issued the Invitation to Tender. In March 2017, the DfT awarded the franchise to First/MTR owned South Western Railway (SWR) to commence on 20 August 2017. It was to run until at least August 2024, with an option for the DfT to extend for a further year.

In 2021, following COVID-19 emergency measures, the DfT gave SWR a direct award contract, replacing its franchise, until 28 May 2023. In February 2023, this was further extended until 25 May 2025.
