= Directly Operated Railways =

Former state holding company for UK railways

Directly Operated Railways Ltd.
- Type: Holding company
- Industry: Rail transport
- Founded: 2009
- Defunct: 2015
- Successor: DfT OLR Holdings
- Headquarters: London, England
- Services: Train operating company management
- Owner: Department for Transport
- Subsidiaries: East Coast
- Website: www.directlyoperatedrailways.co.uk
- Footnotes; Government holding company formed to run temporary rail franchises when private contractors have failed

Directly Operated Railways Ltd. (DOR) was a holding company set up by the Department for Transport (DfT) in the United Kingdom in July 2009 to operate rail franchises should it become necessary to bring them into public ownership. From November 2015, its function was taken over by the DfT, who set up DfT OLR Holdings Limited to carry out that function. A partnership of Arup Group, Ernst & Young and SNC-Lavalin Rail & Transit were appointed temporarily to support them in that function.

== East Coast Main Line Company ==
Subsidiary East Coast Main Line Company trading as East Coast, took over the running of services on the InterCity East Coast franchise from 13 November 2009 following the government assuming control of the franchise from National Express East Coast after it defaulted on its contract. East Coast ceased operating on 28 February 2015, with the franchise passing to Virgin Trains East Coast the following day; however, on 16 May 2018 the government announced that rail services on the East Coast Main Line would be brought back under government control with an operator of last resort appointed.

== West Coast Main Line Company ==
In September 2012, with the potential that DfT would not be able to enter into a contract with its preferred bidder for the InterCity West Coast franchise (FirstGroup) as a result of Virgin Rail Group seeking a judicial review, it was suggested that subsidiary West Coast Main Line Company would take over running of the franchise from December 2012 pending a resolution.

In October 2012, the competition for the franchise was cancelled following the discovery of technical flaws in the franchise process. The Secretary of State for Transport announced that an investigation would be conducted, with the running of the West Coast line likely to be passed into the hands of West Coast Main Line Company to ensure that train services continued uninterrupted. Directly Operated Railways confirmed that it had been asked in mid-September 2012 to prepare to mobilise for temporary transfer of the InterCity West Coast franchise in December. With the announcement DfT was opening negotiations with Virgin Rail Group about operating the franchise on a short-term basis, Directly Operated Railways stepped back from mobilising, but remained on standby.

== Demise ==
In November 2015, DfT took the operator of last resort function back in-house, and appointed a partnership of Arup Group, Ernst & Young and SNC-Lavalin Rail & Transit on a two-year contract, extendable to three years, to support them to deliver that. The operator of last resort function is delivered through DfT OLR Holdings, which was renamed to DfT Operator in 2024.

== See also ==
- South Eastern Trains – the previous occasion the government has run a TOC having taken back a franchise
- East Thames Buses – a similar entity created by Transport for London
