= Scottish Rail Holdings =

Scottish Government-owned holding company for nationalised rail services

Scottish Rail Holdings Ltd.
- Logo of Scottish Rail Holdings
- Formerly: SOLR Holdings Limited (2016–2021)
- Type: Scottish Government owned holding company
- Industry: Rail Transport
- Founded: 28 October 2016; 9 years ago
- Headquarters: Glasgow, Scotland
- Area served: Scotland
- Key people: Iain Docherty (Chairman); Hannah Ross (CEO)
- Services: Public Transport; Passenger Rail; Operator of Last Resort
- Revenue: ▲£746 million (2024)
- Operating income: ▼£2.3 million (2024)
- Net income: ▲£15.1 million (2024)
- Total assets: ▲£775.2 million (2024)
- Total equity: ▼£173.7 million (2024)
- Number of employees: ▲5,172 (2024)
- Parent: Transport Scotland
- Subsidiaries: Caledonian Sleeper; ScotRail
- Website: www.railholdings.scot

Scottish Rail Holdings (SRH) is a government-owned holding company based in Glasgow, Scotland. The company was formed in 2016 and took over the ScotRail franchise in 2022 and the Caledonian Sleeper franchise in 2023. It oversees the majority of passenger rail services in Scotland. Although legally a limited company, it is classified as an executive non-departmental public body by the Scottish Government.

== History ==
It was originally formed in 2016 as SOLR Holdings Limited, a company created under Section 30 of the Railways Act 1993 to act as an operator of last resort if private franchises failed. It was renamed to Scottish Rail Holdings in March 2021, in readiness for the nationalisation of the ScotRail and Caledonian Sleeper franchises by the Scottish Government.

Scottish Rail Holdings took over the ScotRail franchise in April 2022 from Abellio after the franchise was ended five years early by the Scottish Government. In June 2023 Serco's franchise to operate the Caledonian Sleeper franchise, which had been due to run until 2030, was also ended early. With both of Scotland’s main train operating companies under its control, SRH became responsible for the majority of passenger rail services in Scotland.

== Operations ==
By March 2024, Scottish Rail Holdings had become one of the largest passenger rail organisations in Great Britain. It operates the vast majority of Scotland’s passenger rail services and employed 5,172 staff, representing around 8% of the UK’s total train operating company workforce, which stood at approximately 62,000 employees.

SRH delivers the vast majority of national passenger rail services in Scotland through its two operators, ScotRail and Caledonian Sleeper. Its network includes commuter routes in the Central Belt, rural routes in the Highlands, intercity services across the country, and overnight trains to and from England. Most cross-border services are operated by other operators. As a result SRH does not serve Lockerbie and Reston, which are located on mainline routes into England, and are consequently the only stations in Scotland not served by either rail SRH company.

== See also ==
- Railway nationalisation
- DfT Operator
