= Great Western Holdings =

1994–1998 British rail transport company

Great Western Holdings was formed in December 1994 to bid for rail franchises in the United Kingdom during the Privatisation of British Rail. Shares in the company were held by Richard George, Brian Scott and some other British Rail managers (51%), FirstBus (24.5%) and 3i (24.5%).

Great Western Holdings bid for a number of rail franchises winning the First Great Western and the First North Western franchises in 1996 and 1997.

In March 1998, FirstGroup bought out its partners to give it 100% ownership.
