= Railways Act 1993 =

Act of the Parliament of the United Kingdom

Railways Act 1993 (Note: Section 154(1).)
- Act of Parliament
- Parliament of the United Kingdom
- Long title: An Act to provide for the appointment and functions of a Rail Regulator and a Director of Passenger Rail Franchising and of users' consultative committees for the railway industry and for certain ferry services; to make new provision with respect to the provision of railway services and the persons by whom they are to be provided or who are to secure their provision; to make provision for and in connection with the grant and acquisition of rights over, and the disposal or other transfer and vesting of, any property, rights or liabilities by means of which railway services are, or are to be, provided; to amend the functions of the British Railways Board; to make provision with respect to the safety of railways and the protection of railway employees and members of the public from personal injury and other risks arising from the construction or operation of railways; to make further provision with respect to transport police; to make provision with respect to certain railway pension schemes; to make provision for and in connection with the payment of grants and subsidies in connection with railways and in connection with the provision of facilities for freight haulage by inland waterway; to make provision in relation to tramways and other guided transport systems; and for connected purposes.
- Citation: 1993 c. 43
- Territorial extent: England and Wales; Scotland; Northern Ireland (in part); (Note: Section 154(3)–(4).)

Dates
- Royal assent: 5 November 1993
- Commencement: various (Note: Section 154(2).)

Other legislation
- Amends: Regulation of Railways Act 1889; Post Office Act 1953; Transport Act 1962; Transport Act 1968; Post Office Act 1969; British Railways Act 1971; Railways Act 1974; Restrictive Trade Practices Act 1976; Transport Act 1978; Transport Act 1980; Transport Act 1981; Transport (Finance) Act 1982; London Regional Transport Act 1984; Transport Act 1985; Channel Tunnel Act 1987; New Roads and Street Works Act 1991; British Railways Board (Finance) Act 1991
- Repeals/revokes: London Midland and Scottish Railway (Road Transport) Act 1928; Great Western Railway (Road Transport) Act 1928; London and North Eastern Railway (Road Transport) Act 1928; Southern Railway (Road Transport) Act 1928; Great Western Railway (Air Transport) Act 1929; London and North Eastern Railway (Air Transport) Act 1929; London Midland and Scottish Railway (Air Transport) Act 1929; Southern Railway (Air Transport) Act 1929; Transport (Financial Provisions) Act 1977; Transport Act 1962 (Amendment) Act 1981
- Amended by: Transport Act 2000; Statute Law (Repeals) Act 2004; Railways Act 2005; Cities and Local Government Devolution Act 2016; Scotland Act 2016; Digital Markets, Competition and Consumers Act 2024

Status: Amended

Text of statute as originally enacted

Revised text of statute as amended

Text of the Railways Act 1993 as in force today (including any amendments) within the United Kingdom, from legislation.gov.uk.

The Railways Act 1993 (c. 43) is an act of the Parliament of the United Kingdom, introduced by John Major's Conservative government and passed on 5 November 1993. It provided for the restructuring of the British Railways Board (BRB), the public corporation that owned and operated the national railway system.

== Background ==
While the administration of Margaret Thatcher had not done so, the Major government were determined to privatise British Rail. Railways in the 18th and 19th centuries had originally been built and run with private capital, but subsidised heavily by Parliament and communities who gave land for building through compulsory purchase. Rail was increasingly regulated, for instance under the Railways Act 1921 (11 & 12 Geo. 5. c. 55), but was finally nationalised by the Transport Act 1947 (10 & 11 Geo. 6. c. 49). Calls for reform of the nationalised system combined with people who believed only the private sector could run rail to ensure better service for passengers at less cost. This led to the Railways Act 1993 to facilitate privatisation.

== Contents ==
The legislation created a new regulatory regime for the railways, with the establishment of the Rail Regulator (dealing with the monopoly and dominant elements of the industry, principally Railtrack) and the Director of Passenger Rail Franchising, whose role was to sell passenger rail franchises to the private sector.

A few residual responsibilities of the British Railways Board remained with BRB (Residuary) Ltd.

== Subsequent events ==
The legislation enabled the Secretary of State for Transport John MacGregor to transfer separated parts of the railway to the private sector. Passenger rail services were franchised to private companies including Virgin Rail Group, Connex and the coach companies Stagecoach and National Express, and the national railway track and signalling company Railtrack was floated on the London Stock Exchange in 1996. British Rail's track maintenance and renewal operations were sold to private companies, with contracts to provide infrastructure services to Railtrack. The three rolling stock leasing companies or ROSCOs, owners of the passenger rolling stock, were sold to management buyout teams.

The Director of Passenger Rail Franchising was replaced in 2001 by the Strategic Rail Authority. When the SRA was abolished in 2006, franchising was taken over by the Secretary of State for Transport. The statutory position of Rail Regulator was abolished in July 2004 and his functions were taken over by the Office of Rail Regulation.

=== Railtrack ===
Railtrack collapsed in highly controversial circumstances in October 2001, and in October 2002 the company emerged from railway administration, a special state of insolvency for railway companies created by the Railways Act 1993, as Network Rail. Some commentators regard the creation of Network Rail and its taking maintenance in-house as the beginning of the reversal of rail privatisation.

== Amendments ==
The legislation has been amended several times, most significantly by the Transport Act 2000, the Railways and Transport Safety Act 2003 and the Railways Act 2005. The Passenger Railway Services (Public Ownership) Act 2024 greatly altered the sections concerning passenger rail franchising, as the Labour government took passenger operations into public ownership.

== See also ==
- Railways Act 1921
- Transport Act 1947
