= List of companies operating trains in the United Kingdom =

There are many companies operating trains in the United Kingdom, including the operators of franchised and state-owned passenger services, officially referred to as train operating companies (TOCs, except in Northern Ireland), as distinct from freight operating companies.

== Passenger operators in Great Britain ==
=== Current operators ===
Operator	Type	Franchise / contract / concession	Parent(s)	Start date	Replaced	Code
Avanti West Coast	Contract	West Coast Partnership	FirstGroup (70%); Trenitalia (30%)	8 December 2019	Virgin Trains	VT
c2c	State-owned operator	Essex Thameside	DfT Operator	20 July 2025	c2c (Trenitalia)	CC
Caledonian Sleeper	State-owned operator	Caledonian Sleeper	Scottish Rail Holdings	25 June 2023	Caledonian Sleeper (Serco)	CS
Chiltern Railways	State-owned operator	Chiltern	DfT Operator	20 September 2026	Chiltern Railways (Arriva UK Trains)	CH
CrossCountry	Contract	New CrossCountry	Arriva UK Trains	11 November 2007	Central Trains (Birmingham – Stansted), (Cardiff – Nottingham); Virgin CrossCountry	XC
East Midlands Railway	Contract	East Midlands	Transport UK Group	18 August 2019	East Midlands Trains; Northern Trains (Barton-on-Humber – Cleethorpes)	EM
Elizabeth line	TfL concession	Elizabeth line	GTS Rail Operations	25 May 2025	Greater Anglia (Liverpool Street – Shenfield); Great Western Railway (Paddington – Reading); Heathrow Connect; Heathrow Express (Heathrow Central – Heathrow T4 shuttle)	XR
Eurostar	Open access	–	Eurostar Group	14 November 1994	–	ES
First Rail London	TfL concession	London Overground	FirstGroup	3 May 2026	Arriva Rail London	LO
Grand Central	Open access	–	Arriva UK Trains	18 December 2007	–	GC
Great Western Railway	Contract	Greater Western	FirstGroup	1 April 2006	First Great Western; First Great Western Link; Wessex Trains	GW
Greater Anglia (also operating Stansted Express)	State-owned operator	East Anglia	DfT Operator	12 October 2025	Greater Anglia (Transport UK Group, Mitsui)	LE
Greater Thameslink Railway (Trading as: Gatwick Express, Great Northern, Southern and Thameslink)	State-owned operator	Thameslink, Southern & Great Northern	DfT Operator	31 May 2026	Govia Thameslink Railway	SN, TL, GN, GX
Heathrow Express	Open access	–	Heathrow Airport Holdings	23 June 1998	–	HX
Hull Trains	Open access	–	FirstGroup	25 September 2002	–	HT
London North Eastern Railway	State-owned operator	InterCity East Coast	DfT Operator	24 June 2018	Virgin Trains East Coast	GR
Lumo	Open access	–	FirstGroup	25 October 2021	–	LD
Merseyrail	Merseytravel concession	Merseyrail	Merseyrail Electrics 2002: Serco (50%); Transport UK Group (50%)	20 July 2003	Arriva Trains Merseyside	ME
Northern Trains	State-owned operator	Northern	DfT Operator	1 March 2020	Arriva Rail North	NT
ScotRail	State-owned operator	ScotRail	Scottish Rail Holdings	1 April 2022	Abellio ScotRail	SR
Southeastern	State-owned operator	South Eastern	DfT Operator	17 October 2021	Southeastern (Govia)	SE
South Western Railway (also operating Island Line)	State-owned operator	South Western	DfT Operator	25 May 2025	South Western Railway (First MTR)	SW, IL
TransPennine Express	State-owned operator	TransPennine Express	DfT Operator	28 May 2023	TransPennine Express (FirstGroup)	TP
Transport for Wales Rail	State-owned operator	Wales & Borders	Transport for Wales	7 February 2021	KeolisAmey Wales	AW
West Midlands Trains (Trading as: West Midlands Railway and London Northwestern Railway)	State-owned operator	West Midlands	DfT Operator	1 February 2026	West Midlands Trains (Transport UK Group, JR East, Mitsui)	LM

There are also a number of light rail systems.

=== Future operators ===
Future operating companies that have been announced by the Department for Transport. These will be the first nationalised operators to take over passenger services since the passing of the Passenger Railway Services (Public Ownership) Act 2024, which makes state ownership the default option for passenger services.

Operator	Type	Contract	Parent	Date commencing	Replacing	Code
Great Western Railway	State-owned operator	Greater Western	DfT Operator	13 December 2026	Great Western Railway	GW

=== Defunct operators ===
Operating companies have ceased to exist for various reasons, including withdrawal of the franchise, the term of the franchise has expired, bankruptcy or merger.

Operator	Type	Franchise / contract / concession	Parent(s)	Date started	Date ceased	Replaced by	Code
Abellio ScotRail	Franchise	ScotRail	Abellio	1 April 2015	31 March 2022	ScotRail (Scottish Government)	SR
Anglia Railways	Franchise	Anglia	GB Railways	5 January 1997	31 March 2004	One	AR
Arriva Trains Wales	Franchise	Wales & Borders	Arriva UK Trains	8 December 2003	13 October 2018	KeolisAmey Wales	AW
Arriva Trains Merseyside	Franchise	Merseyrail Electrics	Arriva UK Trains	February 2000	20 July 2003	Merseyrail Electrics 2002	ME
Arriva Trains Northern	Franchise	Regional Railways North East	Arriva UK Trains	February 2000	12 December 2004	First TransPennine Express; Northern Rail	AN
Arriva Rail North	Franchise	Northern	Arriva UK Trains	1 April 2016	29 February 2020	Northern Trains	NT
Arriva Rail London (Trading as: London Overground)	TfL concession	London Overground	Arriva UK Trains	13 November 2016	2 May 2026	First Rail London	LO
Caledonian Sleeper (Serco)	Franchise	Caledonian Sleeper	Serco	31 March 2015	24 June 2023	Caledonian Sleeper (Scottish Rail Holdings)	CS
c2c	Franchise	Essex Thameside	Trenitalia	26 May 1996	20 July 2025	c2c	CC
Central Trains	Franchise	Central	National Express Group	2 March 1997	10 November 2007	CrossCountry; East Midlands Trains; London Midland	CT
Chiltern Railways	Franchise	Chiltern	Arriva UK Trains	21 July 1996	20 September 2026	Chiltern Railways	CH
Connex South Central	Franchise	Network SouthCentral	Connex	26 May 1996	12 October 1996	Connex South Central	CX
Connex South Central	Franchise	South Central	Connex	13 October 1996	25 August 2001	South Central	CX
Connex South Eastern	Franchise	South Eastern	Connex	13 October 1996	9 November 2003	South Eastern Trains	CX
East Coast	Franchise	InterCity East Coast	Directly Operated Railways	14 November 2009	28 February 2015	Virgin Trains East Coast	GR
East Midlands Trains	Franchise	East Midlands	Stagecoach	11 November 2007	17 August 2019	East Midlands Railway	EM
First Capital Connect	Franchise	Thameslink and Great Northern	FirstGroup	1 April 2006	13 September 2014	Govia Thameslink Railway	FC
First Great Eastern	Franchise	Great Eastern	FirstGroup	5 January 1997	31 March 2004	National Express East Anglia	GE
First Great Western Link	Franchise	Thames	FirstGroup	1 April 2004	31 March 2006	First Great Western	FK
First North Western	Franchise	North West Regional Railways	FirstGroup	2 March 1997	12 December 2004	Arriva Trains Wales; First TransPennine Express; Northern Rail	NW
First ScotRail	Franchise	ScotRail	FirstGroup	17 October 2004	31 March 2015	Abellio ScotRail	SR
First TransPennine Express	Franchise	TransPennine Express	FirstGroup (55%); Keolis (45%)	1 February 2004	31 March 2016	TransPennine Express	TP
Gatwick Express	Franchise	Gatwick Express	National Express Group	28 April 1996	22 June 2008	Southern	GX
Govia Thameslink Railway	Franchise	Thameslink, Southern and Great Northern	Govia	14 September 2014	31 May 2026	Greater Thameslink Railway	GN, GX, SN, TL
Great North Eastern Railway	Franchise	InterCity East Coast	Sea Containers	28 April 1996	8 December 2007	National Express East Coast	GR
Greater Anglia	East Anglia	Transport UK Group (60%); Mitsui & Co (40%)	5 February 2012	12 October 2025	Greater Anglia	LE	
Great Western Trains	Great Western	Great Western Holdings	4 February 1996	March 1998	First Great Western	GW	
Heathrow Connect	Open Access	—	Heathrow Airport Holdings, FirstGroup	12 June 2005	19 May 2018	TfL Rail	HC
Island Line	Franchise	Island Line	Stagecoach	13 October 1996	3 February 2007	South West Trains	IL
London Midland	Franchise	West Midlands	Govia	11 November 2007	9 December 2017	West Midlands Trains	LM
London Overground Rail Operations	TfL concession	London Overground	Arriva UK Trains (50%); MTR Corporation (50%)	11 November 2007	12 November 2016	Arriva Rail London	LO
Merseyrail Electrics	Franchise	Merseyrail Electrics	MTL	19 January 1997	February 2000	Arriva Trains Merseyside	ME
Midland Mainline	Franchise	Midland Main Line	National Express Group	28 February 1996	10 November 2007	East Midlands Trains	ML
National Express East Anglia	Franchise	Greater Anglia	National Express Group	1 April 2004	5 February 2012	Greater Anglia	LE
National Express East Coast	Franchise	InterCity East Coast	National Express Group	9 December 2007	13 November 2009	East Coast	GR
Northern Rail	Franchise	Northern Rail	Serco (50%); Abellio (50%)	12 December 2004	31 March 2016	Arriva Rail North	NT
Northern Spirit	Franchise	Regional Railways North East	MTL	2 March 1997	February 2000	Arriva Trains Northern	NS
North Western Trains	Franchise	North West Regional Railways	Great Western Holdings	2 March 1997	March 1998	First North Western	NW
ScotRail	Franchise	ScotRail	National Express Group	31 March 1997	17 October 2004	First ScotRail	SR
Silverlink	Franchise	North London Railways	National Express Group	2 March 1997	10 November 2007	London Midland; London Overground Rail Operations	SS
Southeastern	Franchise	Integrated Kent	Govia	1 April 2006	16 October 2021	Southeastern	SE
South Eastern Trains	Franchise	South Eastern	Strategic Rail Authority	9 November 2003	31 March 2006	Southeastern	SE
South Western Railway	Franchise	South Western	FirstGroup (70%); MTR Corporation (30%)	20 August 2017	25 May 2025	South Western Railway	SW
South West Trains	Franchise	South Western	Stagecoach	4 February 2007	19 August 2017	South Western Railway	SW
Southern	Franchise	South Central	Govia	26 August 2001	25 July 2015	Govia Thameslink Railway	SN
Thames Trains	Franchise	Thames	Go-Ahead Group	13 October 1996	31 March 2004	First Great Western Link	TT
Thameslink	Franchise	Thameslink	Govia	2 March 1997	31 March 2006	First Capital Connect	TR
TransPennine Express	Franchise	TransPennine Express	FirstGroup	1 April 2016	28 May 2023	TransPennine Express	TP
KeolisAmey Wales	Franchise	Wales & Borders	KeolisAmey	14 October 2018	6 February 2021	Transport for Wales Rail	AW
Valley Lines	Franchise	Valley Lines	National Express Group	13 October 1996	13 October 2001	Wales & Borders	VL
Virgin Trains East Coast	Franchise	InterCity East Coast	Virgin Group (10%); Stagecoach (90%)	1 March 2015	23 June 2018	London North Eastern Railway	GR
Virgin CrossCountry	Franchise	CrossCountry	Virgin Rail Group	5 January 1997	10 November 2007	CrossCountry; First TransPennine Express; Virgin Trains	VXC
Virgin Trains	Franchise	InterCity West Coast	Virgin Rail Group	9 March 1997	7 December 2019	Avanti West Coast	VT
West Anglia Great Northern (West Anglia Main Line and Lea Valley Lines)	Franchise	West Anglia Great Northern	National Express Group	5 January 1997	31 March 2004	One	WN
West Anglia Great Northern (Great Northern and Fen Line routes)	Franchise	West Anglia Great Northern	National Express Group	5 January 1997	31 March 2006	First Capital Connect	WN
Wales & Borders	Franchise	Wales & Borders	National Express Group	14 October 2001	7 December 2003	Arriva Trains Wales	WB
Wales & West	Franchise	Wales & West	National Express Group	13 October 1996	13 October 2001	Wales & Borders; Wessex Trains	WW
West Midlands Trains	Franchise	West Midlands	Transport UK Group (70%); JR East (15%); Mitsui (15%)	10 December 2017	1 February 2026	West Midlands Trains	LM
Wessex Trains	Franchise	Wessex	National Express Group	14 October 2001	31 March 2006	First Great Western	WE
Wrexham & Shropshire	Open access	Wrexham to London	DB Regio	28 April 2008	28 January 2011	Ceased due to lack of profitability	WS

== Passenger operators in Northern Ireland ==
In Northern Ireland, passenger trains are NI/Ireland government-owned by Translink or the National Transport Authority. The following brands are used:

- Northern Ireland Railways
- Enterprise service from Dublin Connolly to Belfast Grand Central on the Belfast-Dublin line joint venture between Northern Ireland Railways and Iarnród Éireann.

== Railtour operators ==
- 125 Group
- Belmond British Pullman
- Branch Line Society
- Fox & Edwards
- Hastings Diesels Ltd.
- Locomotive Services Limited (including Steam Dreams, InterCity, Blue Pullman, Saphos Trains, and Statesman Rail)
- Railway Touring Company
- Retro Railtours
- Saltburn Railtours
- Scottish Railway Preservation Society
- UK Railtours
- Vintage Trains
- West Coast Railways (including The Jacobite and Northern Belle)

=== Luxury railtours ===
- Belmond Royal Scotsman
- Belmond Britannic Explorer

=== In Northern Ireland ===
- Enthusiast railtours
- Railway Preservation Society of Ireland
- Irish Railway Record Society
- The Modern Railway Society of Ireland

=== Defunct ===
- Belmond Grand Hibernian
- Blue Pullman (Cotswold Rail)
- Compass Tours
- Hertfordshire Railtours
- Kingfisher Railtours
- NENTA
- Pathfinder Tours
- Stobart Pullman

== Freight and spot-hire operators in Great Britain ==
- Balfour Beatty
- Colas Rail
- DCRail
- Direct Rail Services
- DB Cargo UK
- Europhoenix Rail
- Freightliner
- GB Railfreight
- Hanson & Hall
- Heavy Haul Rail
- Loram UK
- Mendip Rail
- RailAdventure
- Rail Operations Group
- Varamis Rail

== Franchised passenger operator structure in Great Britain ==
Sector of British Rail	Franchise	Pre-grouping company	Original privatised operator	Current operator(s)
InterCity	Caledonian Sleeper	N/A	ScotRail	Caledonian Sleeper
InterCity	East Midlands	Midland Railway	Midland Mainline	East Midlands Railway
InterCity	Greater Western	Great Western Railway	Great Western Trains	Great Western Railway
InterCity	InterCity East Coast	Great Northern Railway	Great North Eastern Railway	London North Eastern Railway
InterCity	New CrossCountry	N/A	Virgin CrossCountry	CrossCountry
InterCity	West Coast Partnership	London & North Western Railway	Virgin Trains	Avanti West Coast
Network SouthEast	Chiltern	Great Central Railway	Chiltern Railways	
Network SouthEast	East Anglia	Great Eastern Railway	Anglia Railways	Greater Anglia
Network SouthEast	Essex Thameside	London, Tilbury & Southend Railway	LTS Rail	c2c
Network SouthEast	South Eastern	South Eastern & Chatham Railway	Connex South Eastern	Southeastern
Network SouthEast	South Western	London & South Western Railway	South West Trains	South Western Railway
Network SouthEast	Thameslink, Southern & Great Northern	London, Brighton & South Coast Railway	Thameslink; Connex South Central; West Anglia Great Northern (Great Northern and Fenline routes)	Thameslink; Southern; Great Northern (Greater Thameslink Railway)
Network SouthEast	West Midlands	N/A	Central Trains	West Midlands Railway; London Northwestern Railway (West Midlands Trains)
Regional Railways	Wales & Borders	Predominantly London & North Western Railway	Wales & Borders	Transport for Wales Rail
Regional Railways	TransPennine Express	Predominantly London & North Western Railway	North Western Trains	TransPennine Express
Regional Railways	Northern	Predominantly London & North Western Railway	Northern Spirit	Northern Trains
Regional Railways	ScotRail	Caledonian Railway, Glasgow & South Western Railway, Great North of Scotland Railway, Highland Railway and North British Railway	ScotRail	ScotRail

== See also ==
- Passenger rail franchising in Great Britain (for detailed information about the history of each franchise)
