= GB Rail =

GB Rail may refer to:

- GB Railfreight, railway freight operator in the United Kingdom
- GB Railways, former owner of train companies in the United Kingdom
- Great British Railways, future government body in the United Kingdom company
