= National Express East Anglia =

Former British train operating company

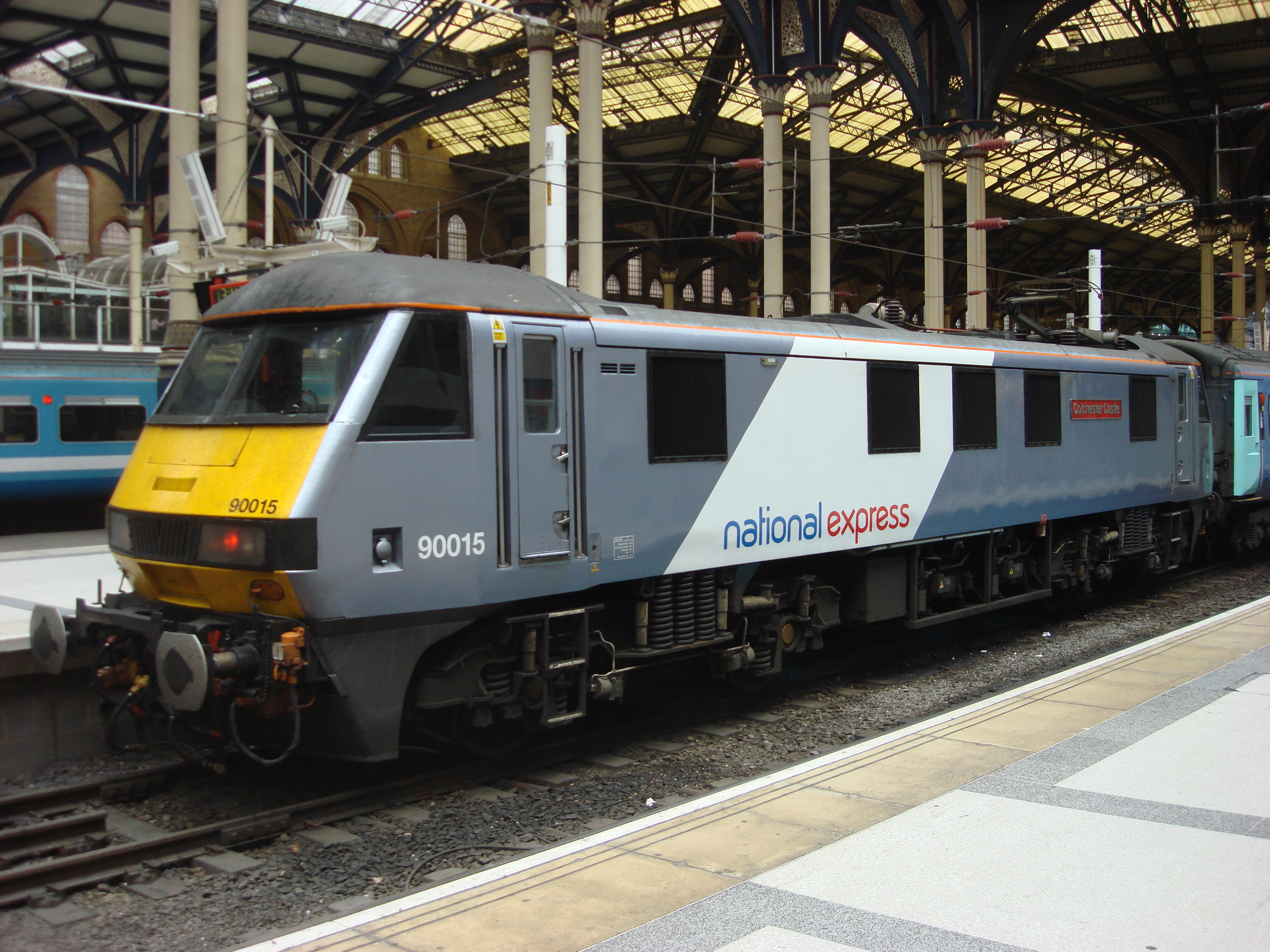
- Class 90 at London Liverpool Street in 2008

Overview
- Franchises: Greater Anglia; 1 April 2004 – 4 February 2012
- Main region: East of England
- Other regions: London, Hertfordshire and Cambridgeshire
- Stations called at: 168
- Parent company: National Express
- Reporting mark: LE
- Predecessors: Anglia Railways; First Great Eastern; West Anglia Great Northern
- Successor: Greater Anglia

Other
- Website: www.nationalexpresseastanglia.com
Route map

National Express East Anglia (NXEA) was a British train operating company owned by National Express that operated the Greater Anglia franchise from April 2004 until February 2012. Originally trading as One, it was rebranded National Express East Anglia in February 2008. It provided local, suburban and mainline services from London Liverpool Street to destinations in east and North London, as well as Essex, Hertfordshire, Cambridgeshire, Suffolk and Norfolk in the East of England.

== History ==
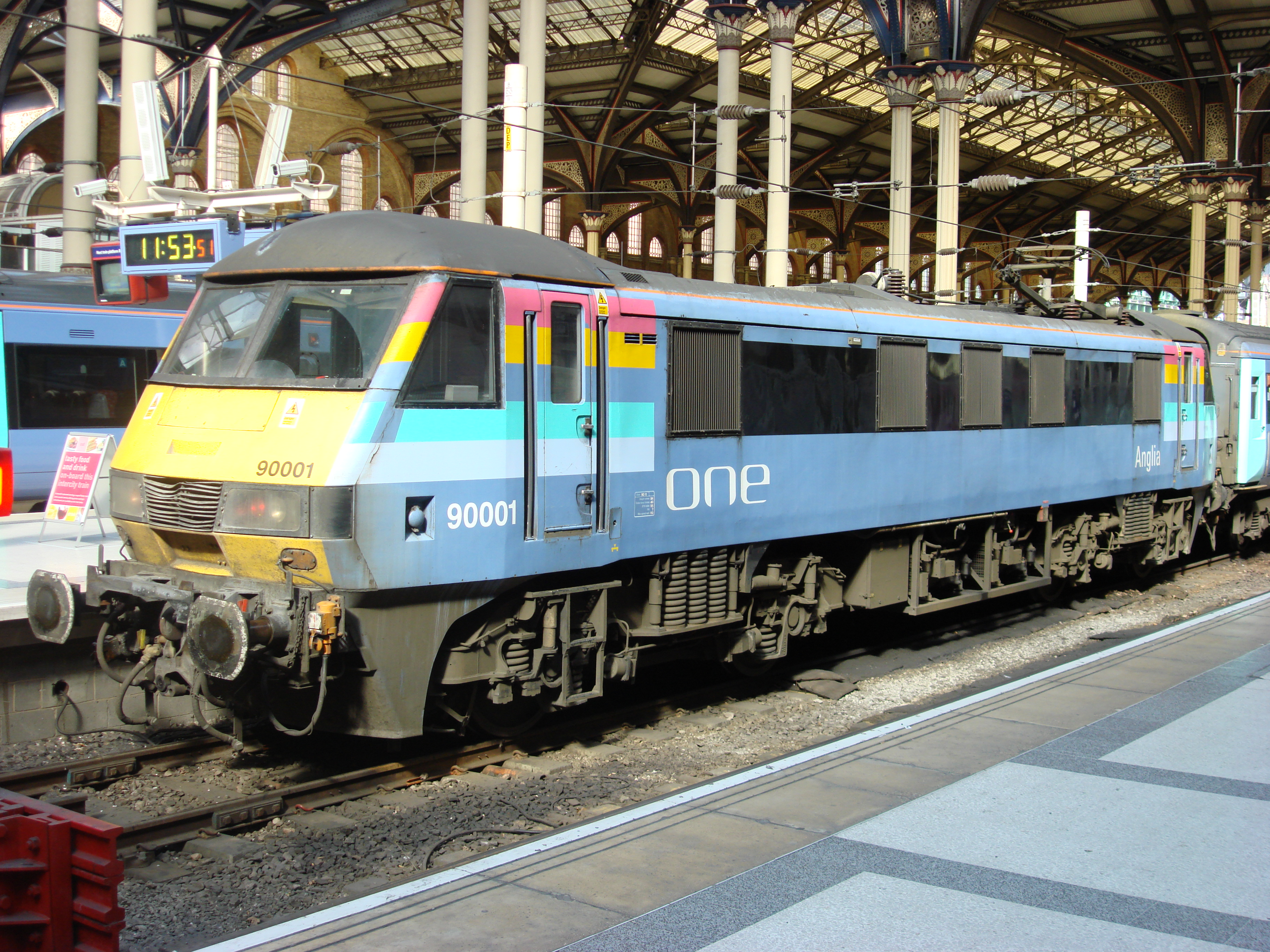
One liveried Class 90 at Liverpool Street station in March 2007

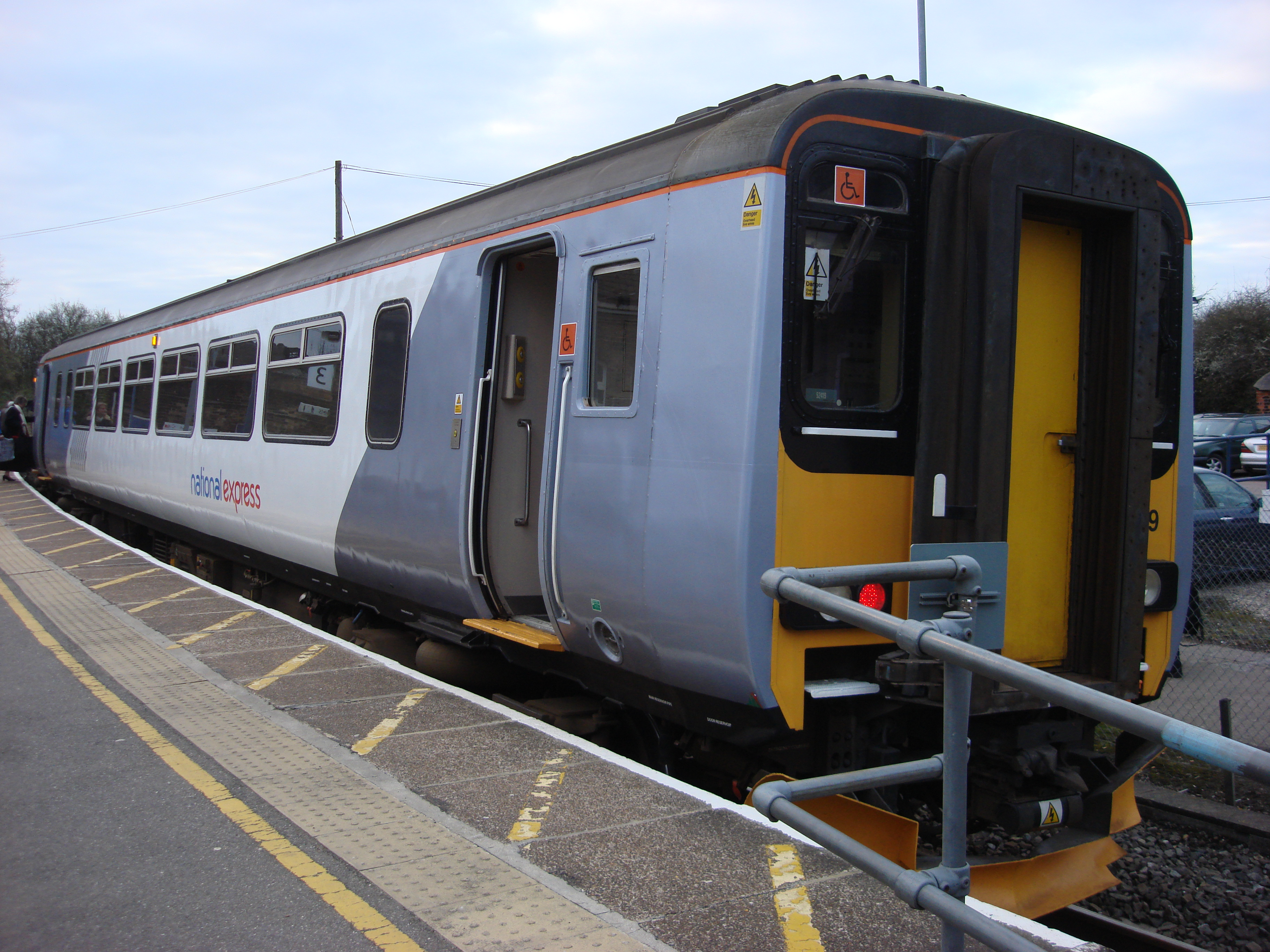
Class 156 at Marks Tey in March 2008

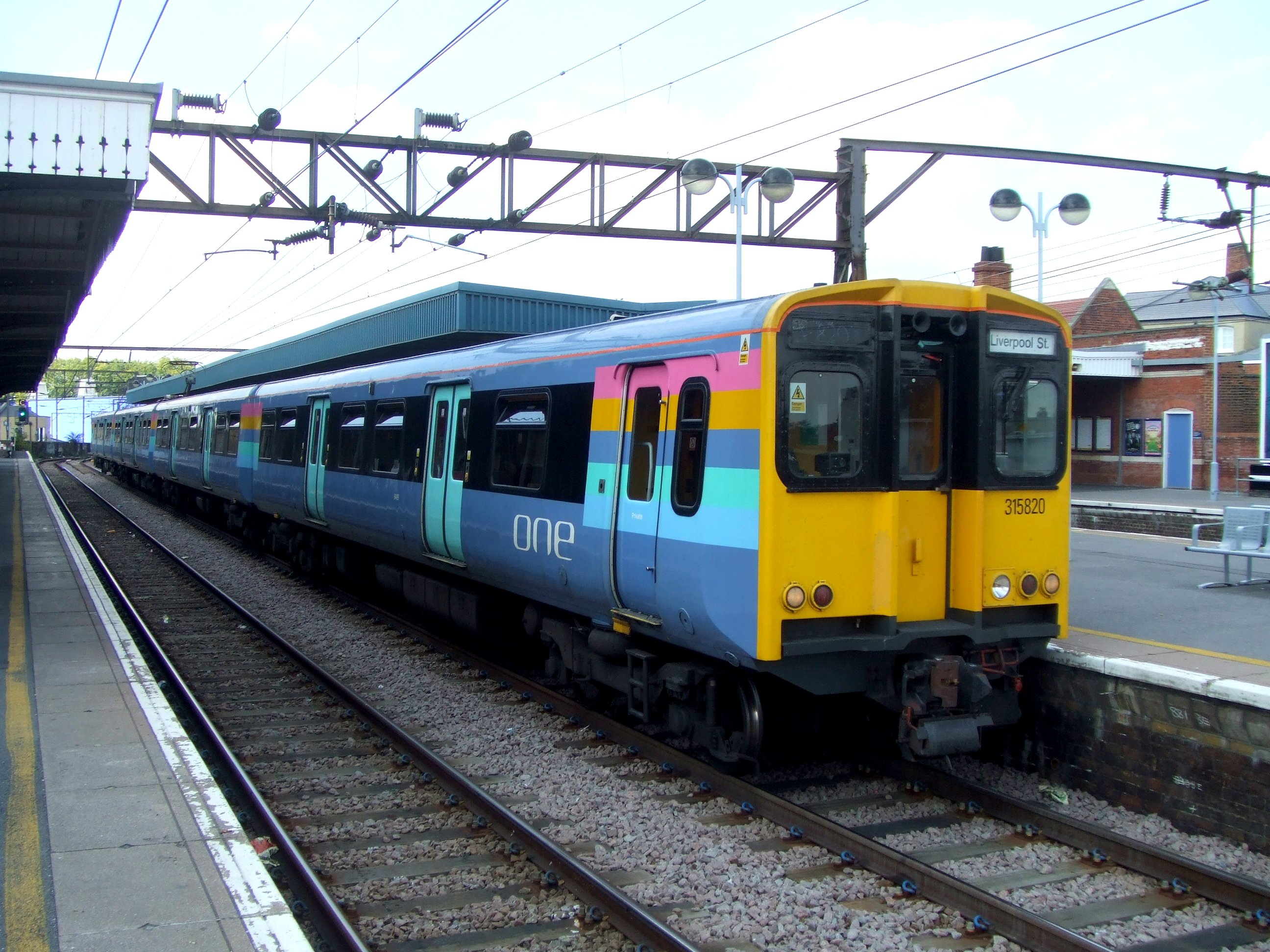
One liveried Class 315 at Hackney Downs station in August 2007

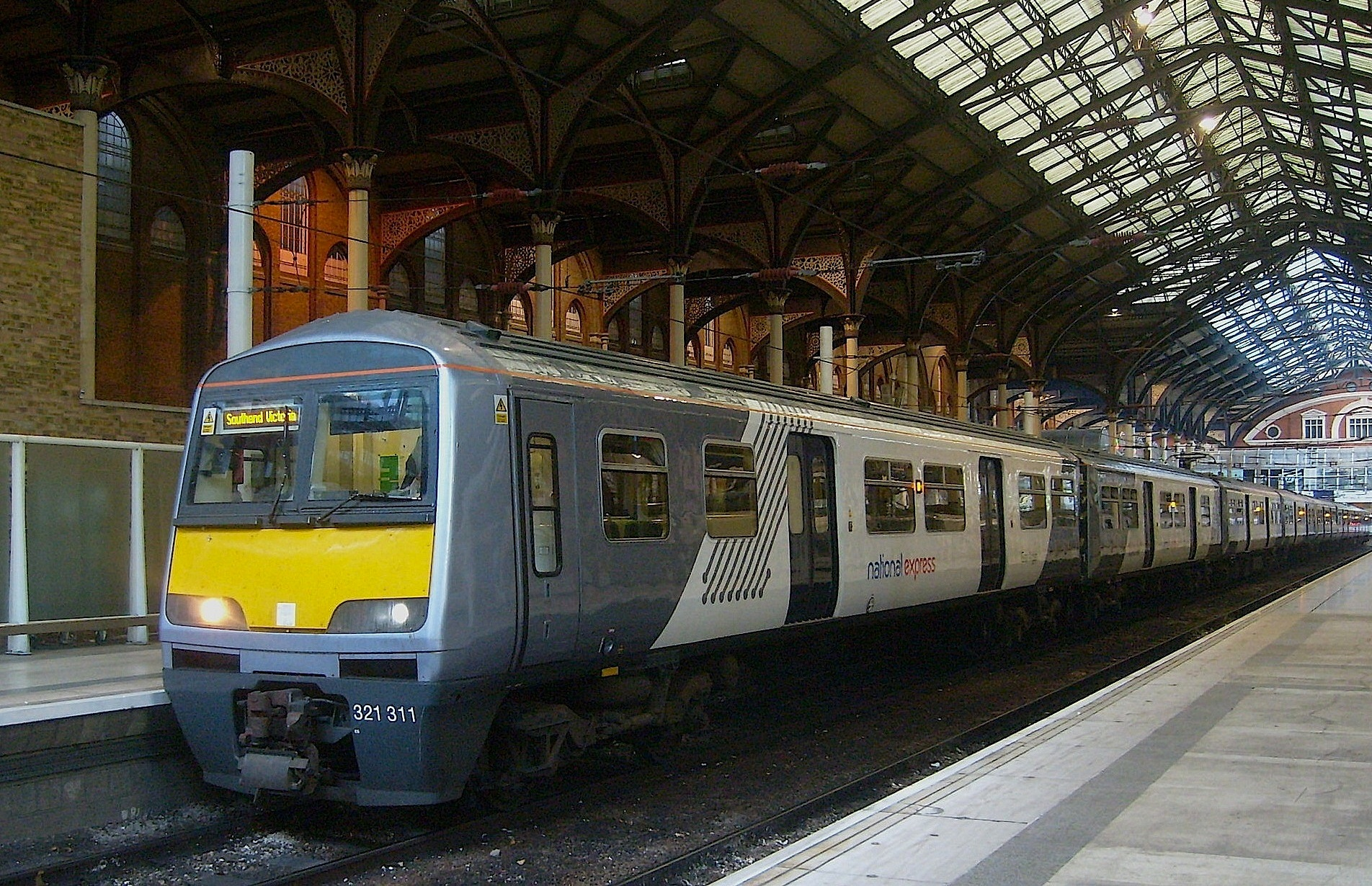
Class 321 at Liverpool Street station

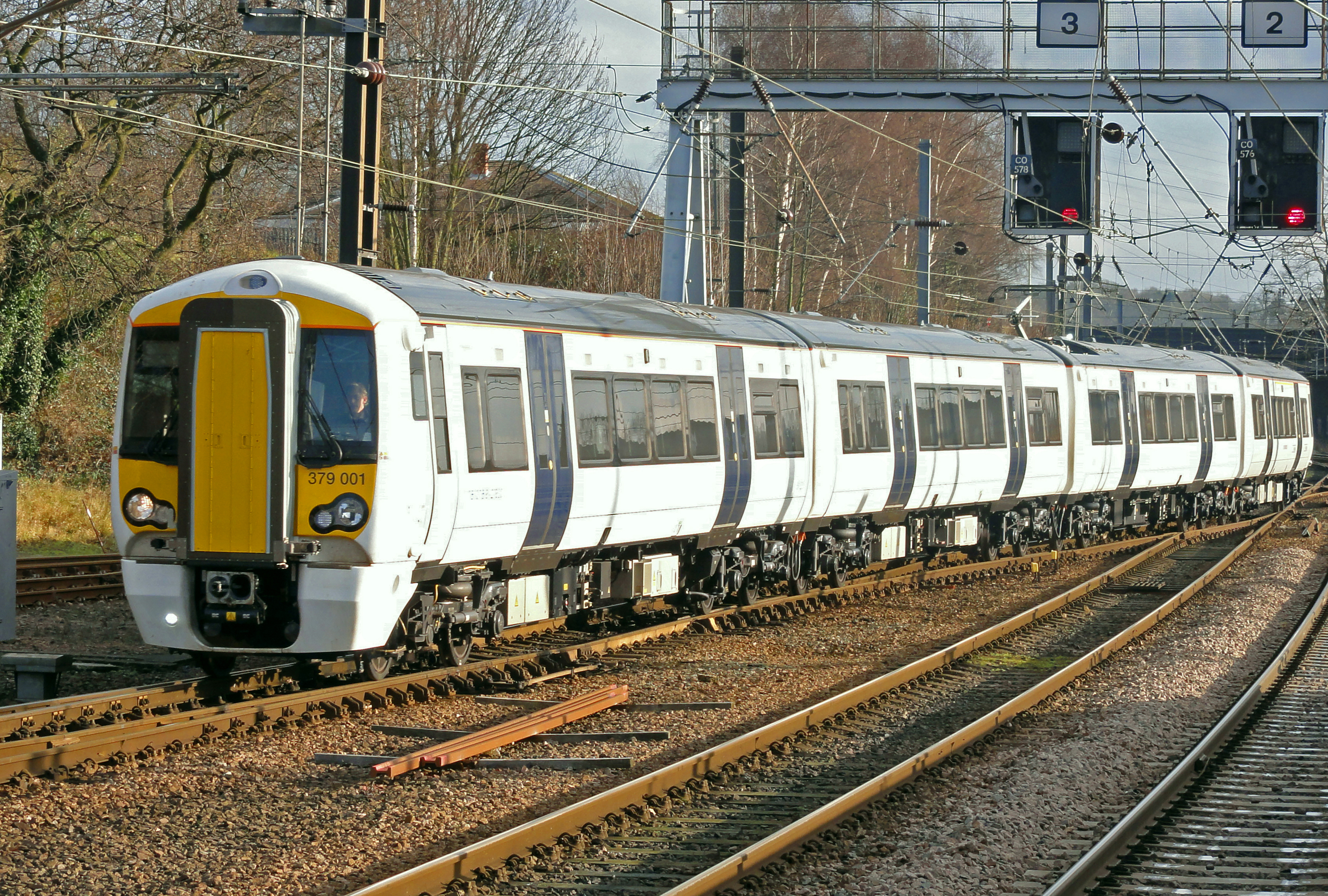
Class 379 in Norwich in January 2011

When the British Rail services operating out of London Liverpool Street were privatised in January 1997, they were divided up between three train operating companies, Anglia Railways, First Great Eastern and West Anglia Great Northern.

In December 2001, the Strategic Rail Authority announced it planned to combine all of the services operating out of London Liverpool Street into one Greater Anglia franchise.

In April 2003, the Strategic Rail Authority announced Arriva, GB Railways and National Express had been shortlisted to bid for the new franchise. In December 2003, the franchise was awarded to National Express with all the services operated by Anglia Railways and First Great Eastern along with those out of London Liverpool Street by West Anglia Great Northern, transferring to One on 1 April 2004. The franchise was to run until March 2011, with provision for a three-year extension if performance targets were met.

=== One Railway ===
The area names from the former franchises were initially retained as sub-brands by the new franchise, One Anglia, One Great Eastern and One West Anglia, however other than Stansted Express all services were soon branded as just One, reflecting the union of the three smaller franchises into one single franchise. This led to passenger confusion as they were unable to establish if announcements were for the 07:20 One service, or the 07:21 service resulting in the company's name being omitted from announcements.

=== National Express East Anglia ===
In February 2008, as part of a group wide rebranding exercise, the franchise was redesignated again. This time it became National Express East Anglia.

In November 2009, the Department for Transport announced National Express would not be granted the three-year extension that it had met the criteria for, because of it defaulting on the National Express East Coast franchise.

Following a change of government at the 2010 General Election, the Department for Transport announced all refranchising would be put on hold while a review was conducted into the franchising process. As a result, National Express were granted an initial extension until October 2011, followed by another until February 2012.

After February 2012 the trains were run by Greater Anglia a subsidiary of Nederlandse Spoorwegen.

== Services ==
In addition to its domestic services, the company was also a partner with Stena Line and Nederlandse Spoorwegen in the Dutchflyer service. Most of the London services use Liverpool Street as their terminus.

=== Former Anglia franchise ===
- Intercity Great Eastern Main Line services to Chelmsford, Colchester, Ipswich and Norwich as well as local services in Suffolk and Norfolk
- Bittern Line (Norwich - Cromer - Sheringham)
- Breckland Line (Norwich - Ely (continuing to Cambridge)
- East Suffolk Line (Ipswich - Lowestoft)
- Ely to Peterborough Line (Ely - Peterborough)
- Felixstowe Branch Line (Ipswich - Felixstowe)
- Ipswich to Ely Line (Ipswich - Bury St Edmunds, continuing to Ely/Newmarket - Cambridge)
- Wherry Lines (Norwich - Great Yarmouth / Lowestoft)

=== Former Great Eastern franchise ===
- Great Eastern Main Line to Chelmsford, Colchester, Clacton-on-Sea and Ipswich
- 'Shenfield Metro' service Liverpool Street - Shenfield
- Upminster Branch Line (Romford - Upminster)
- Shenfield to Southend Line (Shenfield - Southend Victoria)
- Crouch Valley Line (Shenfield–Wickford - Southminster)
- Braintree Branch Line (Witham - Braintree)
- Gainsborough Line (Marks Tey - Sudbury)
- Sunshine Coast Line (Colchester - Colchester Town - Clacton-on-Sea and Walton-on-the Naze)
- Mayflower Line (Manningtree - Harwich Town)

=== Former West Anglia Great Northern franchise ===
- Lea Valley Lines (Liverpool Street to Chingford / Enfield / Cheshunt), also services on the Hertford East Branch Line
- Local services from Liverpool Street - Stansted Airport
- Stratford - Stansted Airport
- West Anglia Main Line Liverpool Street - Harlow / Cambridge (and limited service to King's Lynn)

For eight weeks in summer 2004, Ipswich tunnel was closed with One running two Norwich to Liverpool Street services via Cambridge with Cotswold Rail Class 47s.

In December 2004 new services were introduced from Liverpool Street to Lowestoft (via East Suffolk Line or Norwich), Peterborough, Bury St Edmunds and Cambridge via Ipswich. However, in December 2010 these services were withdrawn.

The Liverpool Street to Harwich International Boat Trains used to be operated by Class 86s and Mark 2s, however EMUs took over the service.

== Rolling stock ==
One inherited a fleet of Class 86, Mark 2 carriages, Driving Brake Standard Opens, Class 150, Class 153 and Class 170 Turbostar, Class 312, Class 315, Class 317, Class 321 and Class 360s from Anglia Railways, First Great Eastern and West Anglia Great Northern.

A franchise commitment was the replacement of the Class 86s and Mark 2 carriages with Class 90s and Mark 3 carriages that were being replaced by Virgin Trains with the Class 390 Pendolino. Initially the Mark 3s entered service in the same run-down condition in which they had left Virgin, before all were overhauled at Bombardier Transportation's Derby Litchurch Lane Works. The last Class 86s and Mark 2 carriages were withdrawn in late 2006.

In 2005, the Class 150s were exchanged with nine Class 156s from Central Trains. In 2009, National Express East Anglia received 17 Class 321s transferred from London Midland.

Another franchise commitment was the procurement of new stock for the Stansted Express service. This resulted in 30 four-carriage Class 379 Electrostars being ordered; the first entered service in March 2011.

A Class 47 was hired from Cotswold Rail for use on rescue duties and to haul the initial weekday and later summer Saturday only services from Norwich to Great Yarmouth. After Cotswold ceased trading in 2009, Direct Rail Services Class 47s were hired. DB Schenker often provided Class 90s to cover for unavailability of One's fleet.

=== Fleet at start of franchise ===
Class	Image	Type	Top speed		Number	Built	Withdrawn	Inherited from
Class	Image	Type	mph	km/h	Number	Built	Withdrawn	Inherited from
47		Diesel locomotive	95	153	Hired from Cotswold Rail	1962–1968	2009 (Note: Hired from Direct Rail Services after cessation of Cotswold Rail.)	N/A
86		Electric locomotive	100	161	15	1965–1966	2005	Anglia Railways
150/2 Sprinter		DMU	75	121	10	1984–1987	2005 (Note: Exchanged for Central Trains Class 156s in 2005)	Anglia Railways
153 Super Sprinter		DMU	75	121	7	1987–1988	2 in 2005	Anglia Railways
170/2 Turbostar		DMU	100	161	12	1999–2002	N/A	Anglia Railways
312		EMU	90	145	3	1975–1978	2004 (Note: Withdrawn immediately after start of franchise)	First Great Eastern
315		EMU	75	121	61	1980–1981	N/A	First Great Eastern & WAGN
317/1		EMU	100	161	27	1981–1982	2006 (Note: Converted to 317/5 & 317/8.)	WAGN
317/6		EMU	100	161	24	1985–1987	N/A	WAGN
317/7		EMU	100	161	9	1981–1982	2012 (Note: Withdrawn at end of franchise)	WAGN
321		EMU	100	161	77	1988–1990	N/A	First Great Eastern
360/1 Desiro		EMU	100	161	21	2002–2003	N/A	First Great Eastern
Mark 2 carriage		Passenger carriage	100	161	115	1964–1975	2005	Anglia Railways
Mark 2 carriage		DBSO	100	161	13	1979–1986	2006	Anglia Railways

=== Fleet at end of franchise ===
Class	Image	Cars per set	Type	Top speed		Number	Routes operated	Built
Class	Image	Cars per set	Type	mph	km/h	Number	Routes operated	Built
47		N/A	Diesel locomotive	95	153	Hired from Direct Rail Services	Train Rescue; Norwich - Great Yarmouth (Summer Only), Norwich - Lowestoft (Summer Only)	1962–1968
90		N/A	Electric locomotive	110	177	15	London - Norwich	1987–1990
153 Super Sprinter		1	DMU	75	121	5	Ipswich - Felixstowe, Norwich - Great Yarmouth, Norwich - Lowestoft, Sudbury - Marks Tey	1987–1988
156 Super Sprinter		2	DMU	75	121	9	Ipswich - Saxmundham, Norwich - Great Yarmouth, Norwich - Lowestoft, Norwich - Sheringham, Sudbury - Marks Tey	1987–1989
170/2 Turbostar		2 or 3	DMU	100	161	12	Ipswich - Cambridge, Ipswich - Peterborough, Ipswich - Lowestoft, Norwich - Cambridge	1999–2002
315		4	EMU	75	121	61	London - Shenfield, London - Hertford East (Peak Hours and Weekends only); London - Enfield Town, London - Cheshunt; London - Chingford	1980–1981
317/5		4	EMU	100	161	15	London - Stansted Airport, London - Cambridge, London - Hertford East, London - Chingford, London - Enfield Town; Stratford - Bishop Stortford	1981–1982
317/6		4	EMU	100	161	24	London - Stansted Airport, London - Cambridge, London - Hertford East, London - Chingford, London - Enfield Town; Stratford - Bishop Stortford, Romford - Upminster	1985–1987
317/7		4	EMU	100	161	9 (Withdrawn when franchise ended)	London - Stansted Airport, London - Cambridge, London - Chingford; London - Hertford East, London - Enfield Town; London - Norwich, London - Harwich International	1981–1982
317/8		4	EMU	100	161	12	London - Stansted Airport, London - Cambridge, London - Hertford East, London - Chingford, London - Enfield Town; Stratford - Bishop Stortford	1981–1982
321		4	EMU	100	161	94	London - Braintree, London - Ipswich, London - Southend Victoria, London - Clacton, Colchester - Walton-on-Naze, Manningtree - Harwich, Wickford - Southminster	1988–1990
360/1 Desiro		4	EMU	100	161	21	London - Ipswich, London - Clacton, London - Colchester Town	2002–2003
379 Electrostar		4	EMU	100	161	30	London - Stansted Airport; London - Cambridge	2010–2011
Mark 3 carriage		N/A	Passenger carriage	110	177	120	London - Norwich; Norwich - Great Yarmouth (Summer Only), Norwich - Lowestoft (Summer Only)	1975–1988
Mark 3 carriage		N/A	Driving Van Trailer	110	177	15	London - Norwich; Norwich - Great Yarmouth (Summer Only), Norwich - Lowestoft (Summer Only)	1988

=== Diagrams ===
Class 315:

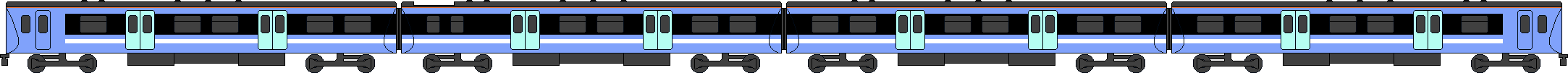

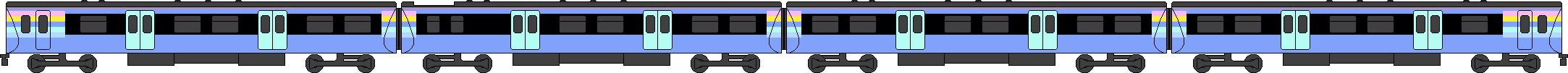

Class 321:

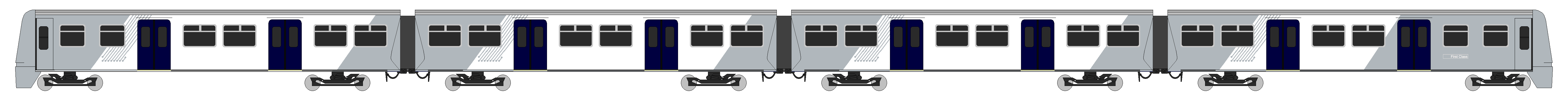

Class 360:

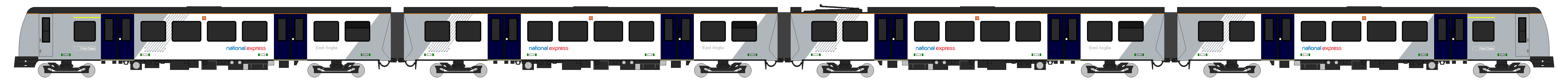

Class 379:

== Performance ==
Infrastructure problems have affected performance. According to Network Rail, the main problems have been track-circuit failures, broken rails, track faults, points failures and overhead line equipment (OLE) failures. Network Rail, which is responsible for the infrastructure, intended to improve performance by work carried out during a planned closure of London Liverpool Street station over Christmas and New Year 2007/8. This allowed much of the outer London overhead line equipment to be replaced by modern, self-tensioning lines. The work was carried out, but overran at short notice by some 24 hours, causing ridicule in the national press.

Detailed figures (from the January edition of Modern Railways) of the miles covered per 5-minute delay for the year ending October 2009 showed that the most reliable trains in the fleet were again the Class 360 Desiros (mainly Clacton-on-Sea to London Liverpool Street), which achieved over 38,000 miles per five-minute delay. The 'workhorse' Class 321s by comparison returned some 21,500 miles per five-minute delay, while the 'Inter-City' Class 90 locomotive-hauled Norwich - Liverpool Street trains came in at some 14,000 miles per five-minute delay - this last figure being a 35% improvement on last year's 10,400. The Class 90 locomotives won the Silver Spanner award for InterCity rolling stock at the Annual National Rail Awards 2009.

== Demise ==
In March 2011, the Department for Transport announced Abellio, Go-Ahead, and Stagecoach had been shortlisted to bid for the new Greater Anglia franchise. In October 2011, the new franchise was awarded to Abellio with the services operated by National Express East Anglia transferring to Greater Anglia on 5 February 2012.

Preceded by Anglia Railways; InterCity Anglia franchise	Operator of Greater Anglia franchise 2004 – 2012	Succeeded by Greater Anglia
Preceded by First Great Eastern; Great Eastern franchise	Operator of Greater Anglia franchise 2004 – 2012	Succeeded by Greater Anglia
Preceded by West Anglia Great Northern; West Anglia Great Northern franchise	Operator of Greater Anglia franchise 2004 – 2012	Succeeded by Greater Anglia
