= First Great Eastern =

British train operating company, 1997–2004

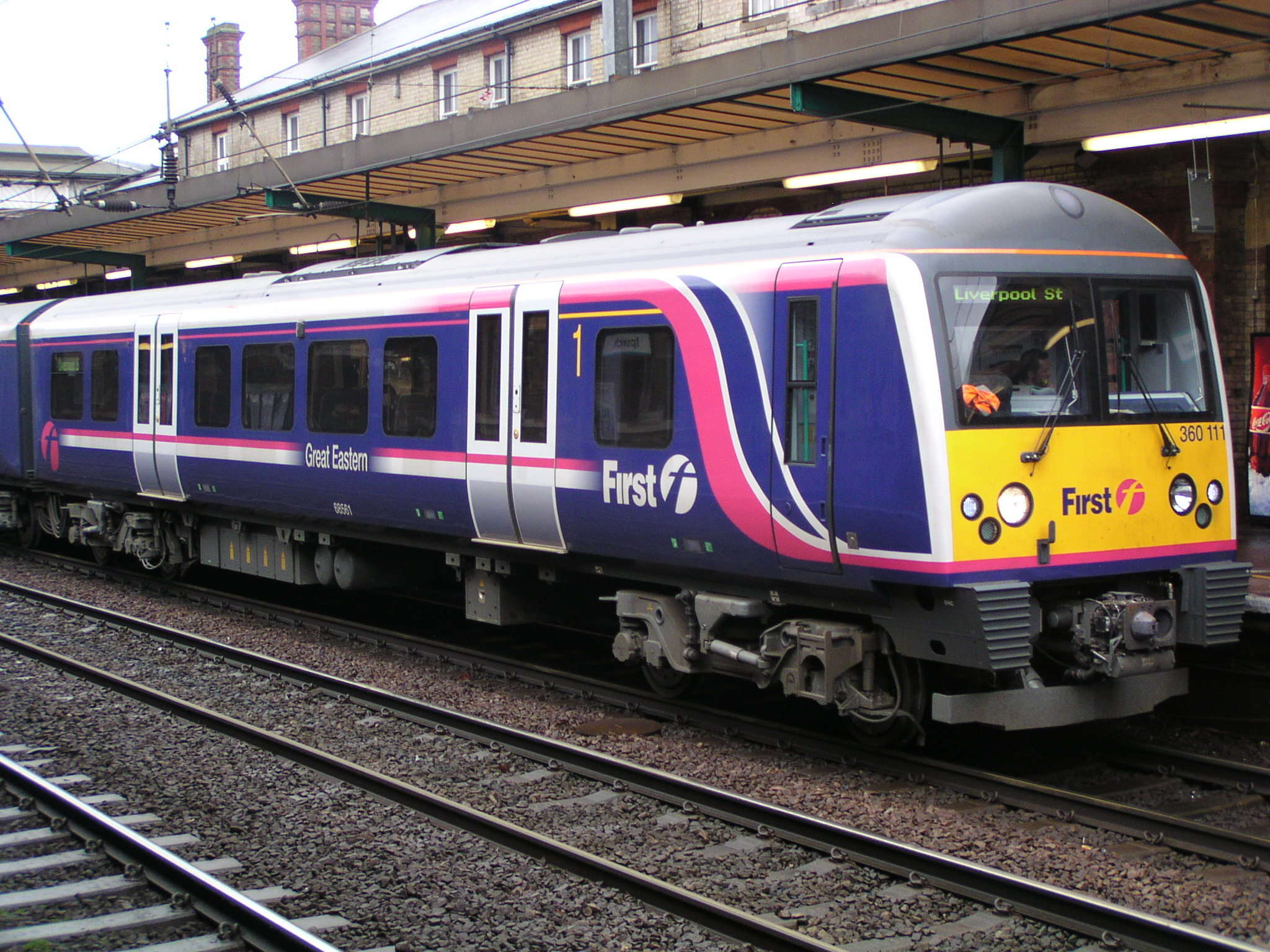
- Class 360 Desiro at Ipswich in 2004

Overview
- Franchises: Great Eastern: 5 January 1997 – 31 March 2004
- Main regions: East London, East of England
- Fleet: 144
- Stations called at: 61
- Parent company: FirstGroup
- Reporting mark: GE
- Successor: One

Other
- Website: www.ger.co.uk (Note: The GER website is no longer in operation.)

First Great Eastern was a British train operating company that ran the Great Eastern franchise in the East of England from January 1997 until March 2004. It was owned by FirstGroup.

Logo used from 1997 to 1999

== Services ==
First Great Eastern operated all stops and limited stops services on the Great Eastern Main Line from London Liverpool Street to Southend Victoria, Southminster, Braintree, Colchester Town, Clacton-on-Sea, Walton-on-the-Naze, Harwich Town and Ipswich. It also ran services on the Romford to Upminster Line and the Gainsborough Line from Marks Tey to Sudbury.

== Rolling stock ==
First Great Eastern inherited a fleet of Classes 312, 315 and 321 electric multiple units from British Rail. A Class 15x diesel multiple unit was hired from Anglia Railways for the Marks Tey to Sudbury service, due to the line not being electrified; a Class 150 was used on weekdays and a Class 153 on weekends. Prior to this arrangement, a Class 121 Bubble Car was hired from Silverlink.

A franchise commitment was the replacement of the Class 312s. In May 2001, First Great Eastern ordered 21 Class 360 Desiros from Siemens Mobility, with the first entering service in August 2003.

Fleet in March 2004, at the end of the franchise:
Class	Image	Type	Top speed		Number	Routes operated	Built
Class	Image	Type	mph	km/h	Number	Routes operated	Built
121 Bubble Car		diesel multiple unit	70	112	Hired from Silverlink	Marks Tey–Sudbury	1960
150		diesel multiple unit	75	120	Hired from Anglia Railways	Marks Tey–Sudbury	1984–1987
153		diesel multiple unit	75	120	Hired from Anglia Railways	Marks Tey–Sudbury	1987–1988
312		electric multiple unit	90	145	24	Colchester–Walton-on-the-Naze; Harwich Town–Manningtree; London Liverpool Street–Clacton-on-Sea and Ipswich (peak times only)	1975–1978
315		electric multiple unit	75	120	43	London Liverpool Street–Shenfield and Southminster; Romford–Upminster	1980–1981
321		electric multiple unit	100	160	77	London Liverpool Street–Braintree, Southend Victoria, Ipswich, Walton-on-the-Naze, Colchester Town, Clacton-on-Sea; Wickford–Southminster (Sundays only)	1988–1990
360/1 Desiro		electric multiple unit	100	160	21	London Liverpool Street–Clacton-on-Sea and Harwich Town; London Liverpool Street–Ipswich (peak times only)	2002–2003

== Depot ==
First Great Eastern's fleet was maintained at Ilford EMU Depot.

== Demise ==
In 2002, as part of a franchise reorganisation by the Strategic Rail Authority, it was announced that the Great Eastern franchise would be merged into a new Greater Anglia franchise. In December 2003, the Strategic Rail Authority awarded the franchise to National Express and services were transferred to One (later National Express East Anglia) on 1 April 2004.

Preceded by Network SouthEast; As part of British Rail	Operator of Great Eastern franchise 1997–2004	Succeeded by One; Greater Anglia franchise
