= Driving Brake Standard Open =

British railway control car

British Rail DBSO
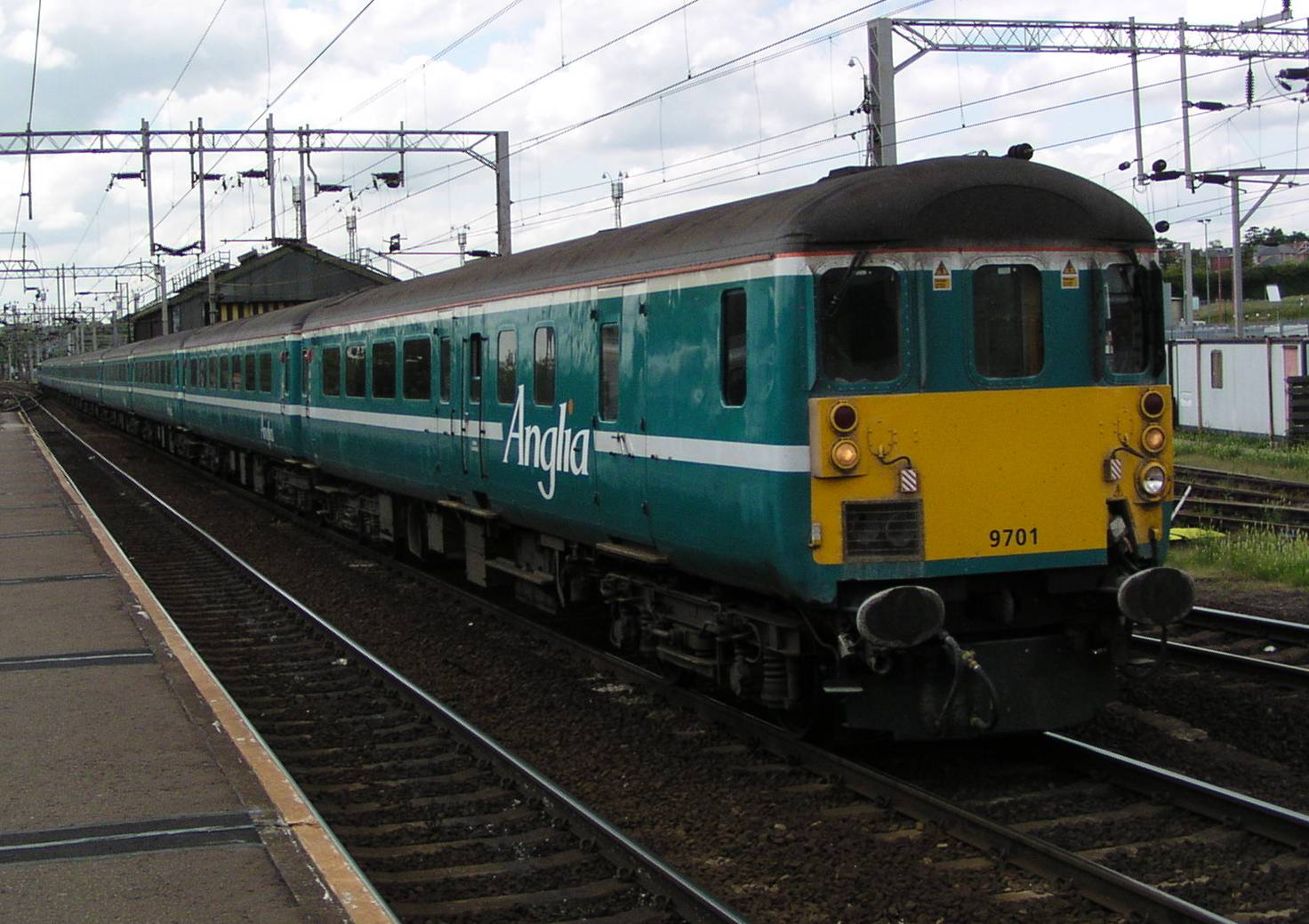
- Anglia Railways' DBSO 9701, at Colchester station in June 2003
- In service: 1979–present
- Manufacturers: Originally: BREL, Derby; Rebuilt: BREL, Glasgow
- Family name: British Rail Mark 2
- Number built: 14 rebuilt
- Number preserved: 3
- Number scrapped: 2
- Fleet numbers: 9701–9714
- Operators: Locomotive Services Limited; Network Rail

Specifications
- Car length: 66 ft 0 in (20.12 m)
- Width: 9 ft 3 in (2.82 m)
- Height: 12 ft 9 1/2 in (3.899 m)
- Maximum speed: 100 mph (160 km/h)
- Weight: 33 long tons (33.5 t; 37.0 short tons)
- Braking system: Air
- Track gauge: 1,435 mm (4 ft 8 1/2 in)

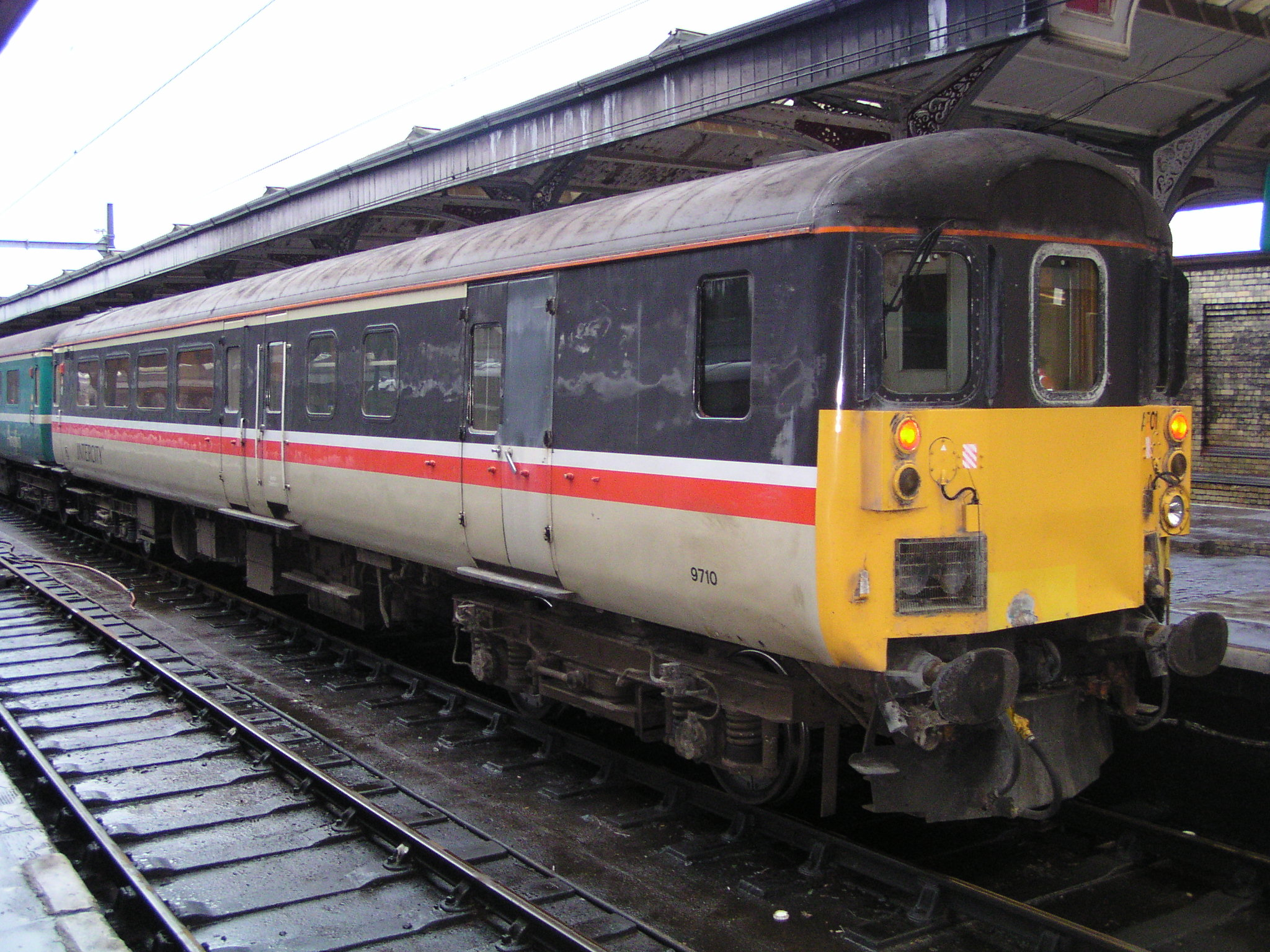
InterCity liveried DBSO 9710, at Norwich station in January 2004

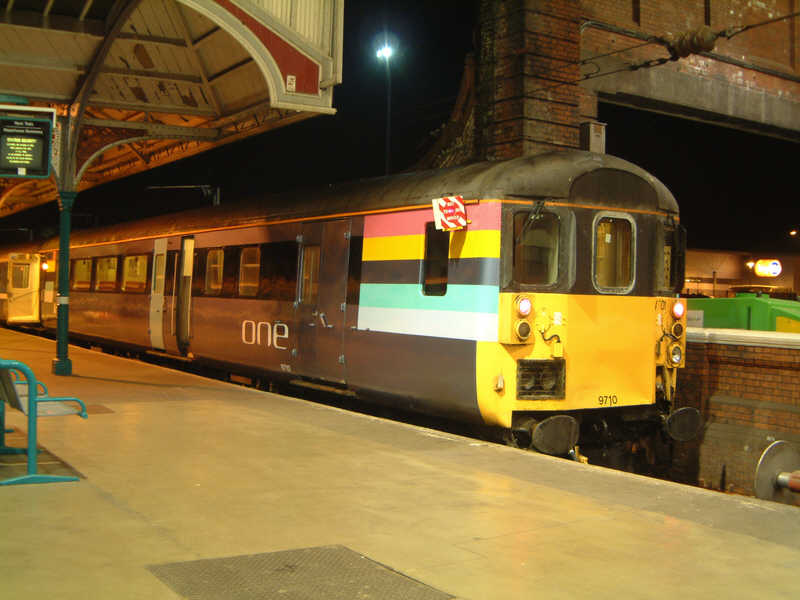
'ONE' liveried DBSO 9710, at Norwich station in April 2004

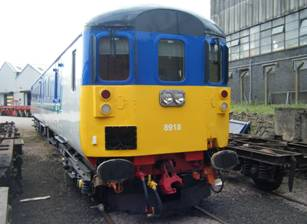
DBSO 9712, following conversion for use by NI Railways as 8918

A Driving Brake Standard Open (DBSO) is a type of railway carriage in the United Kingdom, converted to operate as a control car; this is not to be confused with DVTs, such as those in InterCity 225 sets. Fourteen such vehicles, numbered 9701 to 9714, were converted from Mark 2F Brake Standard Open (standard class coaches with brake van) carriages. Modifications included adding a driving cab and TDM equipment to allow a locomotive to be driven remotely. Using a system known as push–pull, the driver in the DBSO can drive the locomotive, even though it is at the opposite end of the train.

== Operations ==
The vehicles were converted in two batches. Numbers 9701–9710 were converted in 1979 for use on the newly introduced Glasgow–Edinburgh InterCity ScotRail push–pull service with specially modified Class 47/7 locomotives. A further four, 9711–9714, were converted in 1985/86. The fourteenth was a replacement for no. 9706, which was derailed and damaged beyond repair in the Polmont rail crash after it hit a cow.

When first introduced, the DBSO fleet had half-cabs and retained their end gangways. They were later rebuilt to have full-width cabs, with the removal of the end gangways.

In the late 1980s, with the introduction of Class 158 diesel multiple units on the Glasgow–Edinburgh corridor, the DBSO fleet was transferred en-masse, and converted to use the TDM system used by the AC electric locomotives used on the London Liverpool Street to Norwich services on the newly electrified Great Eastern Main Line. The Mark 2E/2F coaching stock used on the route was based at Crown Point TMD and rakes were marshalled into semi-permanent formations (numbered AR01–AR13). Traction was provided by Class 86/2 electric locomotives.

As part of the privatisation of British Rail, the London–Norwich route became part of the Anglia Railways franchise. From 1997 onwards, a new livery of turquoise with a white stripe was introduced onto all Anglia stock. However, rake AR01, containing DBSO 9710 retained its old InterCity livery. On the Anglia services they were originally attached to the first class coaches but this was changed and they were attached to the standard class coaches as the seating in the DBSO was standard class.

In April 2004, the Anglia franchise became part of the new One franchise. The thirteen surviving DBSOs were still in service, although they were gradually replaced by Driving Van Trailers (cascaded from Virgin Trains). One DBSO, no. 9710, had the new one Anglia livery applied by means of adhesive vinyls, whilst retaining the InterCity livery underneath.

However, many of the new Mark 3 sets being received by Anglia were not originally accompanied by DVTs. For this reason a small number of DBSOs were retained until enough DVTs had been received. The last DBSOs were withdrawn from mainline service in December 2006. DBSO 9713 was preserved for further use on the Mid-Norfolk Railway, although this was later sold to Direct Rail Services and scrapped following component recovery.

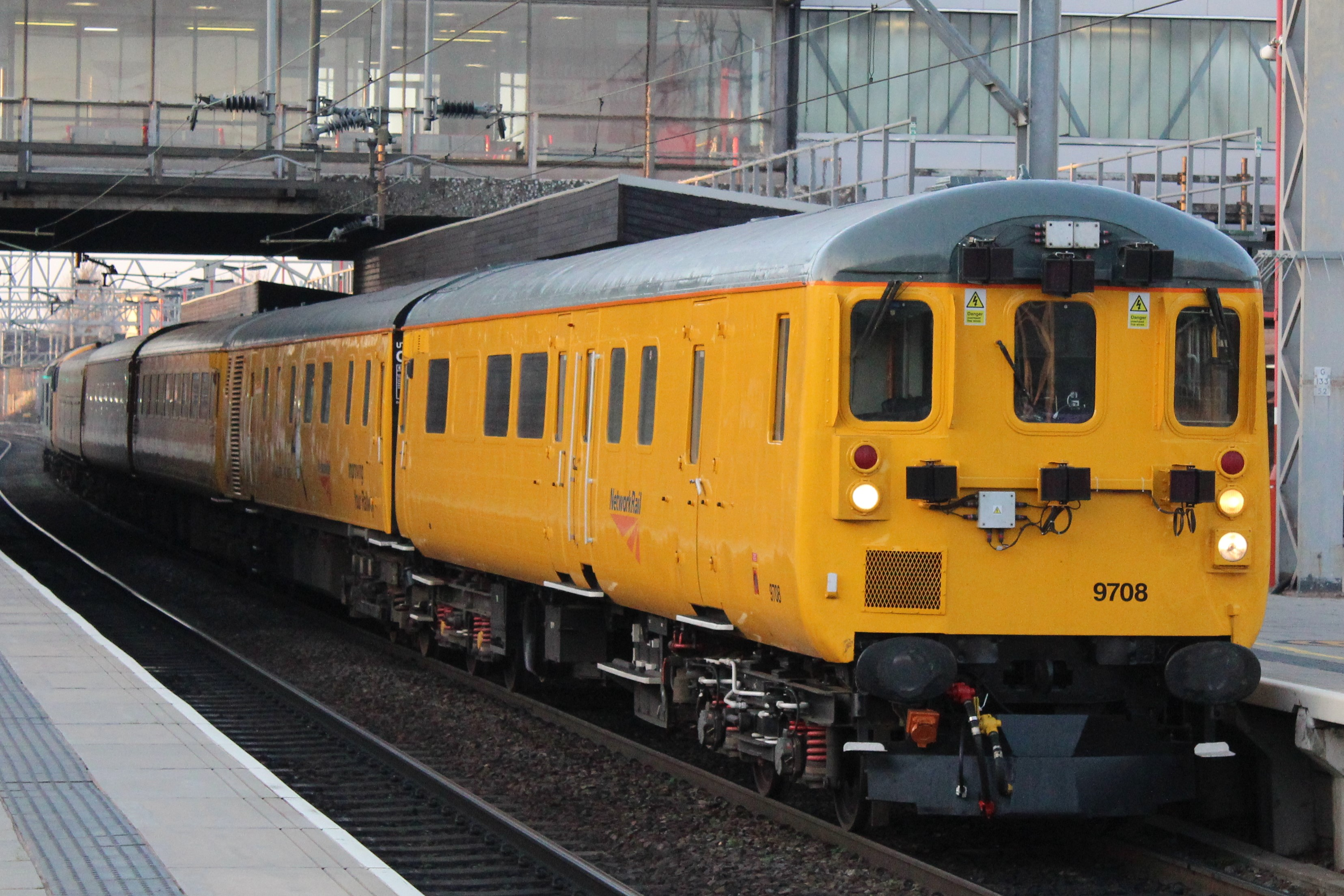
Network Rail DBSO 9708 at Stafford station on a test train 18 November 2018

In February 2007, Network Rail took delivery of five DBSOs, nos. 9701, 9702, 9703, 9708 and 9714. These have been converted to allow test-trains to run in push–pull mode, therefore eliminating the need to operate two locomotives (one at each end of the train). Three of these (9701, 9708 and 9714) were subsequently fitted with a 60 kVA diesel generator to provide power for onboard systems while in operation.

Ex Anglia MK2 driving trailer 9712 was sold to Northern Ireland Railways for use on the ex Gatwick set to convert it to push–pull operation using 111 class locomotives. It is registered as 8918 on NIR. The vehicle was delivered to Belfast on 26 June 2009, almost 14 months late on its contracted delivery date. The ex-Gatwick coaches were stopped on 19 June (before it was delivered) and have now been withdrawn.

In 2015, three were purchased by Direct Rail Services from British American Railway Services. These were overhauled and in July 2015 entered service on Northern Rail Cumbrian Coast Line services.

In September 2017, DBSO 9711 was acquired by Crewe Diesel Preservation Group for preservation alongside Class 47/7 locomotive 47712 and moved to Crewe Heritage Centre.

In 2022, Direct Rail Services offered their five DBSO vehicles for sale. Locomotive Services Limited acquired 9704 and 9707, Eastern Rail Services acquired 9709, 9710 and 9705.

On 18 October 2022, Locomotive Services Group revealed that 9707 had been repainted back into its 1980s ScotRail livery; it is expected that it will operate its first charter train in early 2023, as part of a six-coach set, with 47712 Lady Diana Spencer.

== Fleet details ==
Full details of the DBSO fleet are given below:

Key:	In Service	Stored	Preserved	Scrapped

Numbers		Built	Converted	Current Livery	Operator	Withdrawn	Status
DBSO	BSO	Built	Converted	Current Livery	Operator	Withdrawn	Status
9701	9528	1974 Derby	1979 Glasgow	NR Yellow	Network Rail	Operational	In service with Network Rail
9702	9510	1974 Derby	1979 Glasgow	NR Yellow	Network Rail	Operational	In service with Network Rail
9703	9517	1974 Derby	1979 Glasgow	NR Yellow	Network Rail	Operational	In service with Network Rail
9704	9512	1974 Derby	1979 Glasgow	DRS Compass	Locomotive Services Limited	Stored	
9705	9519	1974 Derby	1979 Glasgow	DRS Compass	Eastern Rail Services Limited	Stored	
9706	9514	1974 Derby	1979 Glasgow			11/1984	Scrapped following Polmont rail accident
9707	9511	1974 Derby	1979 Glasgow	ScotRail	Locomotive Services Limited	Preserved	Used for railtours to Scotland with 47712 'Lady Diana Spencer'
9708	9530	1974 Derby	1979 Glasgow	NR Yellow	Network Rail	Operational	In service with Network Rail
9709	9515	1974 Derby	1979 Glasgow	DRS Compass	Eastern Rail Services Limited	Stored	
9710	9518	1974 Derby	1979 Glasgow	DRS Compass	Eastern Rail Services Limited	Stored	
9711	9532	1974 Derby	1985 Glasgow	Anglia Railways	Crewe Diesel Preservation Group	12/2006	Moved to Crewe Heritage Centre for restoration
9712	9534	1974 Derby	1985 Glasgow	Translink Gatwick	Downpatrick and County Down Railway	04/2006	Barrier vehicle at Downpatrick (now 8918)
9713	9535	1974 Derby	1985 Glasgow			10/2016	Scrapped at CF Booth, Rotherham
9714	9536	1974 Derby	1986 Glasgow	NR Yellow	Network Rail	Operational	In service with Network Rail
