= Anglia Railways =

Train operating company in the East of England

- A Class 86 at Ipswich

Overview
- Franchises: Anglia: 5 January 1997 – 31 March 2004
- Main route: Great Eastern Main Line
- Other routes: Bittern Line, Breckland Line, East Suffolk Line, Ely to Peterborough Line, Felixstowe Branch Line, Ipswich to Ely Line, London Crosslink, Mayflower Line, Wherry Lines
- Stations called at: 64
- Parent company: GB Railways (1997–2003), FirstGroup (2003–2004)
- Reporting mark: AR
- Predecessor: InterCity, Regional Railways
- Successor: National Express East Anglia

Other
- Website: www.angliarailways.co.uk

Anglia Railways was a British train operating company that operated the Anglia franchise in the East of England from January 1997 until March 2004; it was owned by GB Railways and later FirstGroup.

== History ==
The Anglia franchise was awarded by the Director of Passenger Rail Franchising to GB Railways; it commenced on 5 January 1997. In June 1998, Anglia Railways unveiled a turquoise and white livery. Prior to 1997, trains in the area were operated by British Rail sectors of InterCity, Regional Railways and Network SouthEast.

On 1 April 2004, operations passed to National Express East Anglia.

== Services ==
Anglia Railways operated the following routes:

- Inter-city services:
  - Great Eastern Main Line between London Liverpool Street, Ipswich and Norwich
  - Manningtree-Harwich, for boat trains between Liverpool Street and Harwich International.
- Regional services:
  - Ely-Peterborough
  - Ipswich-Ely/Cambridge
  - Ipswich-Felixstowe
  - Ipswich-Lowestoft
  - London Crosslink
  - Norwich-Ely/Cambridge
  - Norwich-Great Yarmouth/Lowestoft
  - Norwich-Sheringham.

A franchise commitment was to increase the hourly London Liverpool Street-Norwich services to half-hourly. The half-hourly service was introduced in 2000 with some extended to Sheringham, Great Yarmouth and Lowestoft.

With funding from the Strategic Rail Authority's Rail Partnership Funding, Anglia Railways introduced a new experimental service from the Great Eastern Main Line to Basingstoke, via the North London Line, branded London Crosslink. It operated from 22 May 2000 until 28 September 2002, due to poor patronage.

A more successful new service with Rail Partnership Funding was introduced on 29 September 2002 from Norwich to Cambridge on the Breckland Line; the route continues to operate.

== Rolling stock ==
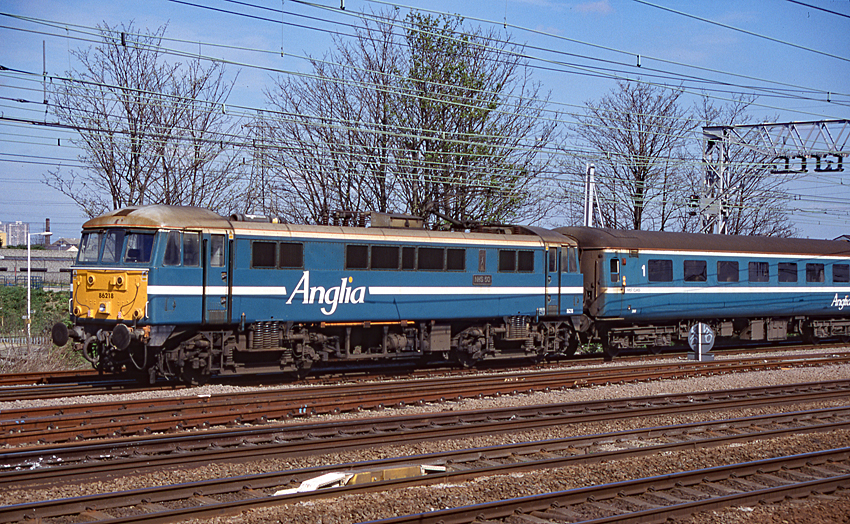
86218 NHS 50 propelling a down Norwich train past Pudding Mill Lane (1999)

Anglia Railways inherited a fleet of Class 86s, Mark 2 coaches, Driving Brake Standard Opens, Class 150s and Class 153s from British Rail. As part of the franchise, the fleet of Mark 2 coaches had a complete mechanical and interior refurbishment. On 10 June 1998, it unveiled its turquoise and white livery. In June 1998, preserved Class 201 diesel-electric multiple unit no. 1001 commenced an eleven-month lease, operating services on the Wherry Lines.

To meet a franchise commitment to operate two services per hour between London Liverpool Street and Norwich, eight three-car Class 170 Turbostar units were delivered in 1999/2000. These units were used on new services from Liverpool Street to Sheringham, Great Yarmouth and Lowestoft; they were also used on London Crosslink services and, from September 2000, were hired to GB Railways' Hull Trains subsidiary to work services between London King's Cross and Hull Paragon

Due to the late delivery of these units, Class 317s and Class 322s were hired from West Anglia Great Northern for a time. A further four two-car Class 170s were delivered in 2002 and were used principally on the new Norwich to Cambridge services.

Anglia hired a Class 47 from Cotswold Rail, from June 2002, as a rescue locomotive and to haul Mark 2 sets on summer Saturday services to Great Yarmouth.

In July 2002, Anglia hired a Class 90 from Freightliner for a few months, with a view to replacing the Class 86s.

In October 2003, Anglia began operating three Class 90s from English, Welsh & Scottish Railway until the end of the franchise.

Fleet at end of franchise
Class	Image	Type	Top speed		Number	Built
Class	Image	Type	mph	km/h	Number	Built
47		Diesel locomotive	100	160	1, hired from Cotswold Rail	1966
86		Electric locomotive	100	160	15	1965–1966
90		Electric locomotive	110	177	3	1987–1990
150/2 Sprinter		Diesel multiple unit	75	120	10	1984–1987
153 Super Sprinter		Diesel multiple unit	75	120	7	1987–1988
170/2 Turbostar		Diesel multiple unit	100	160	12	1999–2002
Mark 2		Passenger carriage	100	160	115	1964–1975
Mark 2		DBSO	100	160	13	1979–1986

== Depot ==
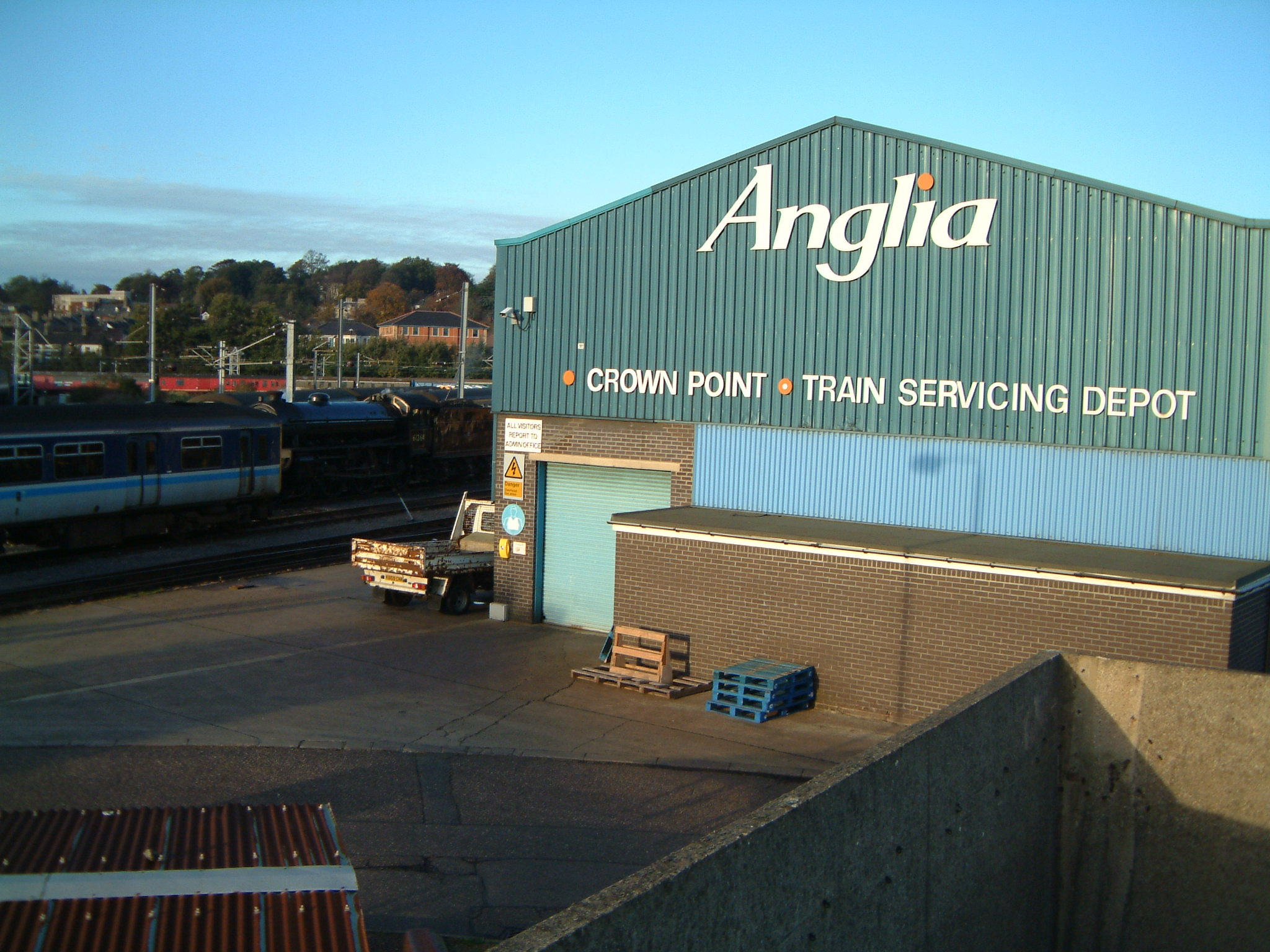
Crown Point TMD in November 2001

Anglia Railways' fleet was maintained at Crown Point TMD in Norwich.

== Franchise reorganisation ==
In 2002, as part of a franchise reorganisation by the Strategic Rail Authority, it was announced that the Anglia franchise would be merged into a new Greater Anglia franchise. Having missed out on pre-qualifying for the Greater Anglia franchise, FirstGroup purchased GB Railways in August 2003.

In December 2003, the Strategic Rail Authority awarded the new Greater Anglia franchise to National Express, with the services operated by Anglia Railways transferring to the One brand on 1 April 2004.

Preceded by InterCity; Regional Railways; As part of British Rail	Operator of Anglia franchise 1997–2004	Succeeded by One; Greater Anglia franchise
