= East Anglia franchise =

British passenger railway franchise

East Anglia
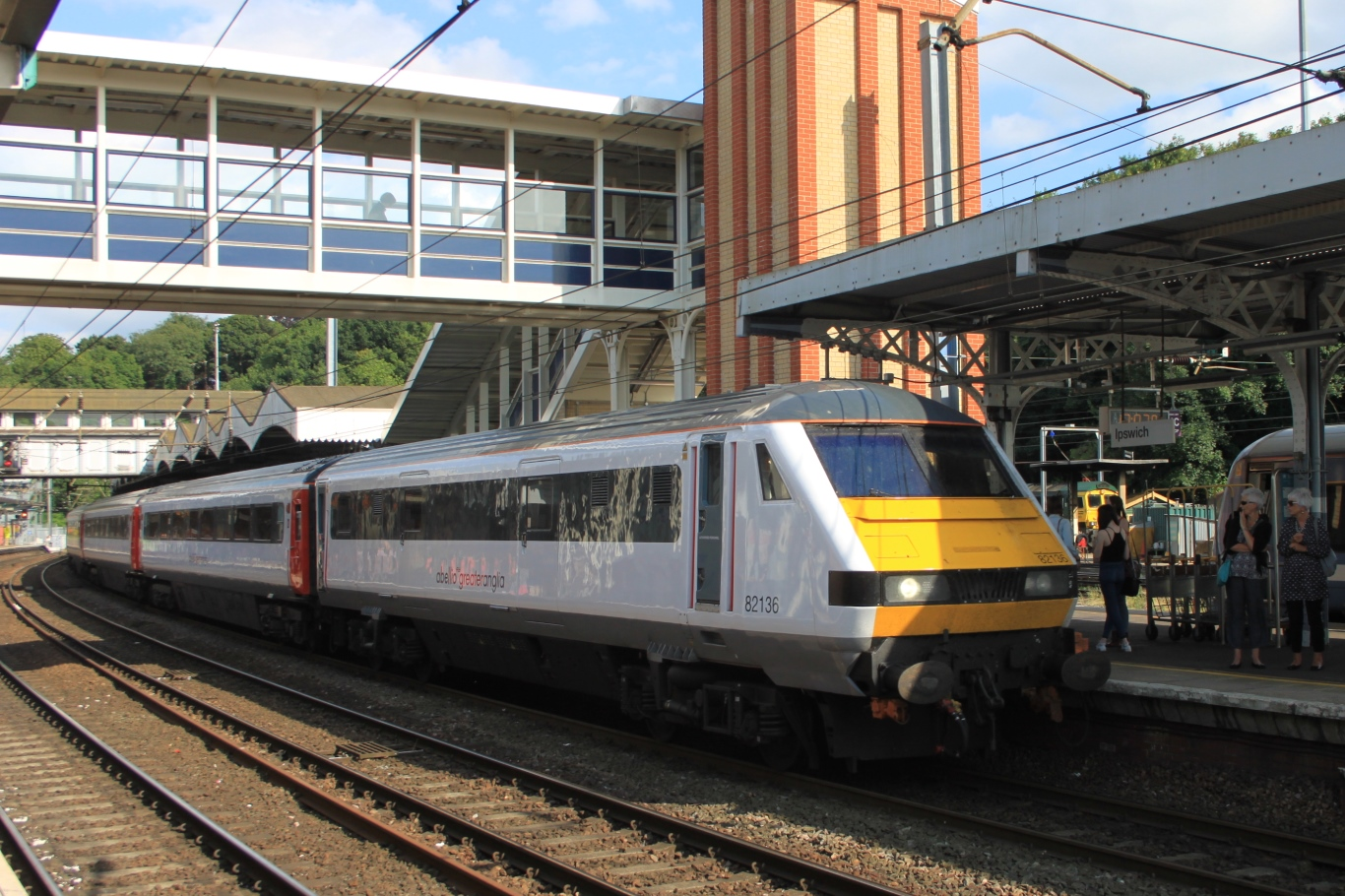
- Abellio Greater Anglia Driving Van Trailer at Ipswich in June 2014
- Main Routes: Great Eastern Main Line; West Anglia Main Line
- Dates of operation: 1 April 2004 – 4 February 2012 (National Express East Anglia); 5 February 2012 – 12 October 2025 (Abellio Greater Anglia)
Route map

The East Anglia franchise was a railway contract, and former railway franchise for passenger trains on the Great Eastern Main Line and West Anglia Main Lines in England. It commenced operation in April 2004 when the Anglia and Great Eastern franchises, together with the West Anglia part of the West Anglia Great Northern franchise, were combined to form the Greater Anglia franchise.

Initially operated by National Express East Anglia, it was taken over by Abellio Greater Anglia in February 2012. In May 2015, the Liverpool Street to Chingford/Cheshunt and Enfield Town and Romford to Upminster services were transferred to London Overground, and the Liverpool Street to Shenfield services were transferred to TfL Rail. Upon being re-tendered in 2016, it was retained by Abellio and rebranded as Greater Anglia, as specified by the Department for Transport.

== History ==
In 2002, as part of a franchise reorganisation by the Strategic Rail Authority, it was announced that the Anglia and Great Eastern franchises, together with the West Anglia part of the West Anglia Great Northern franchise, would be combined to form the Greater Anglia franchise. This was part of the Strategic Rail Authority's strategy to reduce the number of train operating companies providing services from a single London terminal. This was expected to improve efficiency and reliability.

== April 2004 to February 2012 ==
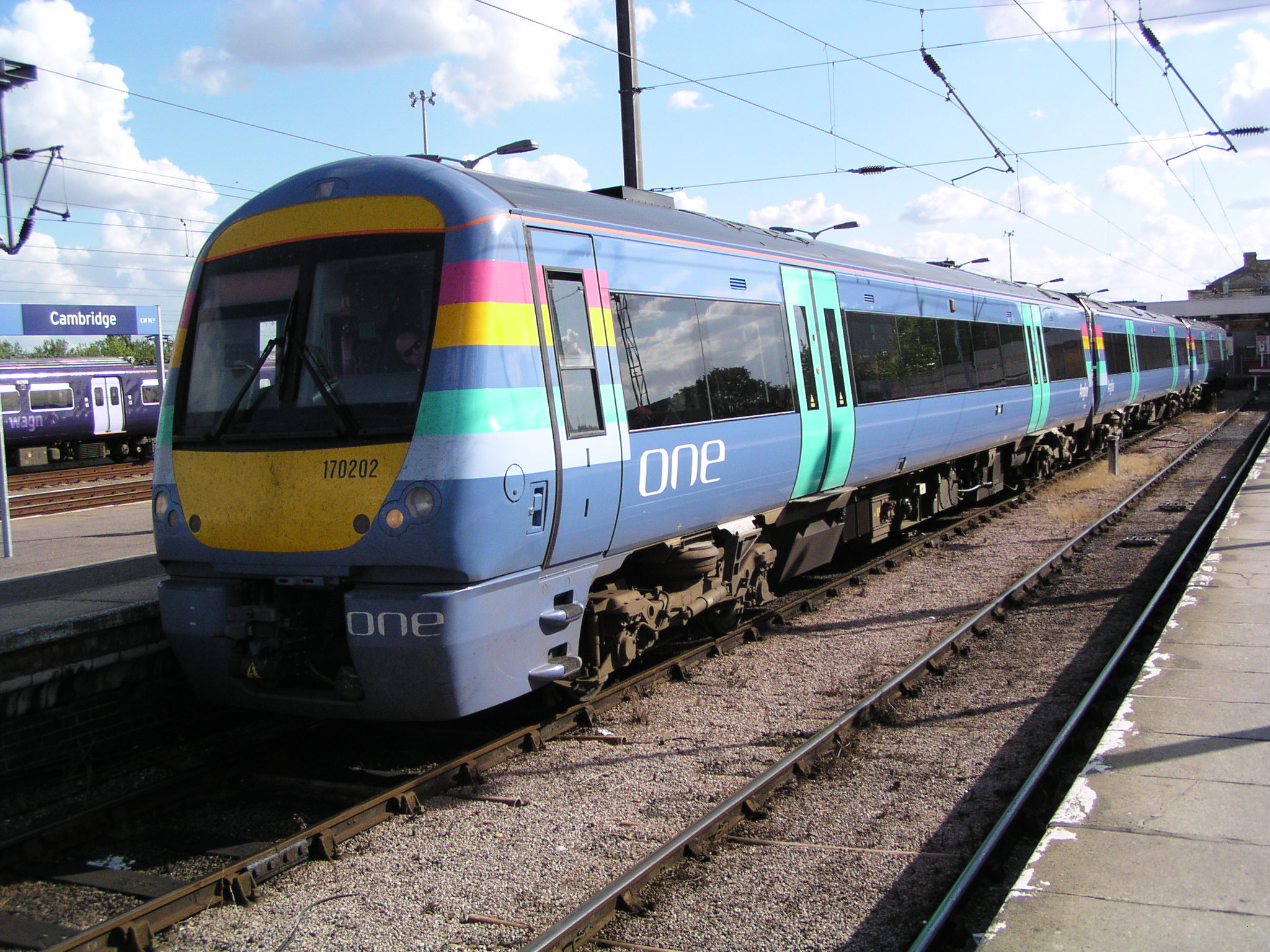
One 170202 at Cambridge station

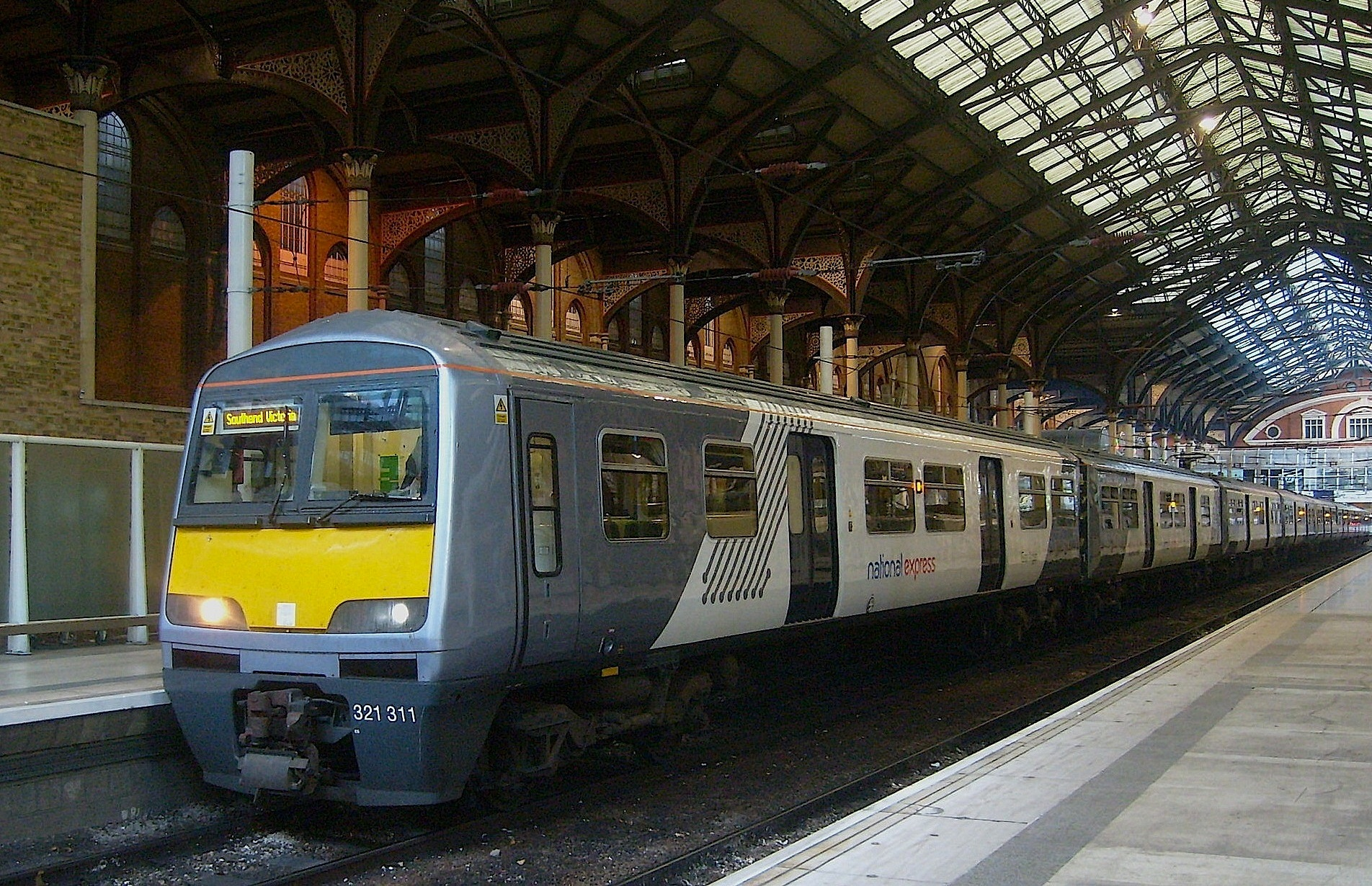
National Express East Anglia 321311 at Liverpool Street station

In April 2003, the Strategic Rail Authority announced that Arriva, GB Railways and National Express had been shortlisted to bid for the new franchise.

In December 2003, the Strategic Rail Authority awarded the franchise to National Express, with the services operated by Anglia Railways, First Great Eastern and West Anglia Great Northern transferred to One on 1 April 2004. The franchise was run until March 2011, with provision for a three-year extension to 2014 if performance targets were met. The franchise was originally branded as One before being rebranded as National Express East Anglia in February 2008 as part of a company-wide rebranding programme.

In November 2009, the Department for Transport announced that National Express was to lose the Greater Anglia franchise in March 2011 rather than be granted an extension until March 2014. The decision followed National Express defaulting on the National Express East Coast franchise even though National Express East Anglia had met all of its targets required for the franchise to be extended.

In June 2010, following the general election, the Department for Transport announced that the replacement process for the franchise would be put on hold, pending a review of the franchising process. This resulted in an extension being granted until February 2012.

== February 2012 to October 2016 ==
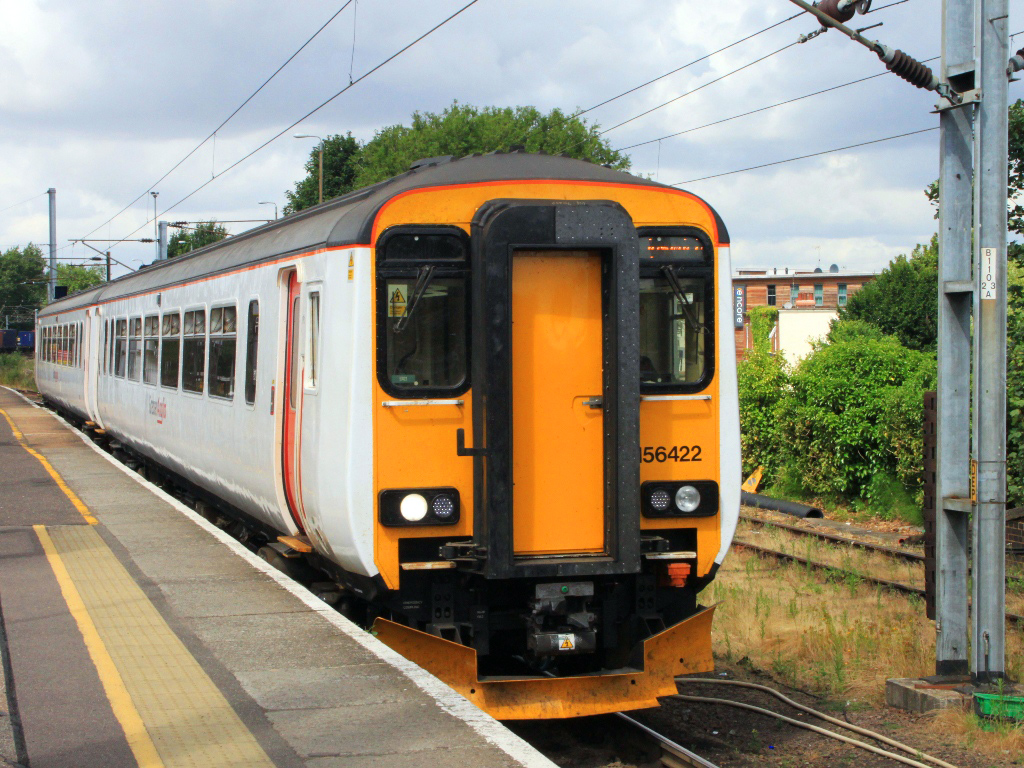
Abellio Greater Anglia 156422 at Ipswich station in July 2013

When tendering restarted, it was for a short-term franchise which would give the government time to plan changes in rail franchising policy based on Roy McNulty's Rail Value for Money study. It also covered the period of the 2012 Olympic Games. The franchise was originally to run from 5 February 2012 until July 2014.

In March 2011, the Department for Transport announced that Abellio, Go Ahead and Stagecoach had been shortlisted for the new franchise, with the Invitation to Tender issued in April 2011. In October 2011, the franchise was awarded to Abellio and the services operated by National Express East Anglia transferred to Abellio Greater Anglia on 5 February 2012.

In March 2013, the Secretary of State for Transport announced that the franchise would be extended until 15 October 2016. However, on 31 May 2015, the Liverpool Street to Chingford/Cheshunt and Enfield Town and Romford to Upminster services were transferred to London Overground and the Liverpool Street to Shenfield services to TfL Rail.

In late 2013, Greater Anglia was rebranded as Abellio Greater Anglia.

== October 2016 to October 2025 ==
The process of tendering for the new franchise began on 19 February 2015. In June 2015, an Abellio (60%) / Stagecoach (40%) joint venture, FirstGroup and National Express were shortlisted to bid for the franchise. On 9 December 2015, it was announced that Stagecoach had pulled out of the joint bid with Abellio, and that Abellio would continue the bid alone.

In August 2016, it was announced that Abellio had successfully bid to operate the new franchise running from 16 October 2016 until 11 October 2025. A franchise commitment was to replace the entire fleet with 1,043 new carriages. Bombardier Transportation's Derby Litchurch Lane Works would build 665 Class 720 Aventra electric multiple unit vehicles, while 378 Class 745 and Class 755 Stadler Flirt electric multiple unit carriages would work between London and Norwich, and London and Stansted Airport.

In March 2017, Abellio sold a 40% stake in the business to Mitsui.

In 2021, following the COVID-19 emergency measures, Greater Anglia was given a direct award contract, replacing its franchise agreement, with a core term until 15 September 2024 and expiring on 20 September 2026.

In December 2024, the Labour government invoked a break clause to end the contract a year early, in Autumn 2025. The government plans to bring Greater Anglia into public ownership under the terms of the Passenger Railway Services (Public Ownership) Act 2024, on 12 October 2025.

=== Requirements ===
The invitation to tender was published on 17 September 2015 and included the following requirements.

- introduce 180 additional weekly services, running on Mondays to Sundays to stations including Cambridge, Norwich, Stansted Airport, Southend and London Liverpool Street
- introduce two 90-minute services in each direction between Norwich and London
- improve the quality of trains running on East Anglia's network, providing a modern service with state-of-the-art trains; extra points will be awarded to bidders who include plans to trial new technologies in rolling stock
- introduce free Wi-Fi for all passengers across the network
- meet "challenging targets" to reduce crowding on the busiest services
- introduce one 60-minute service in each direction between Ipswich and London
