= West Anglia Great Northern =

British train operating company, 1997-2006

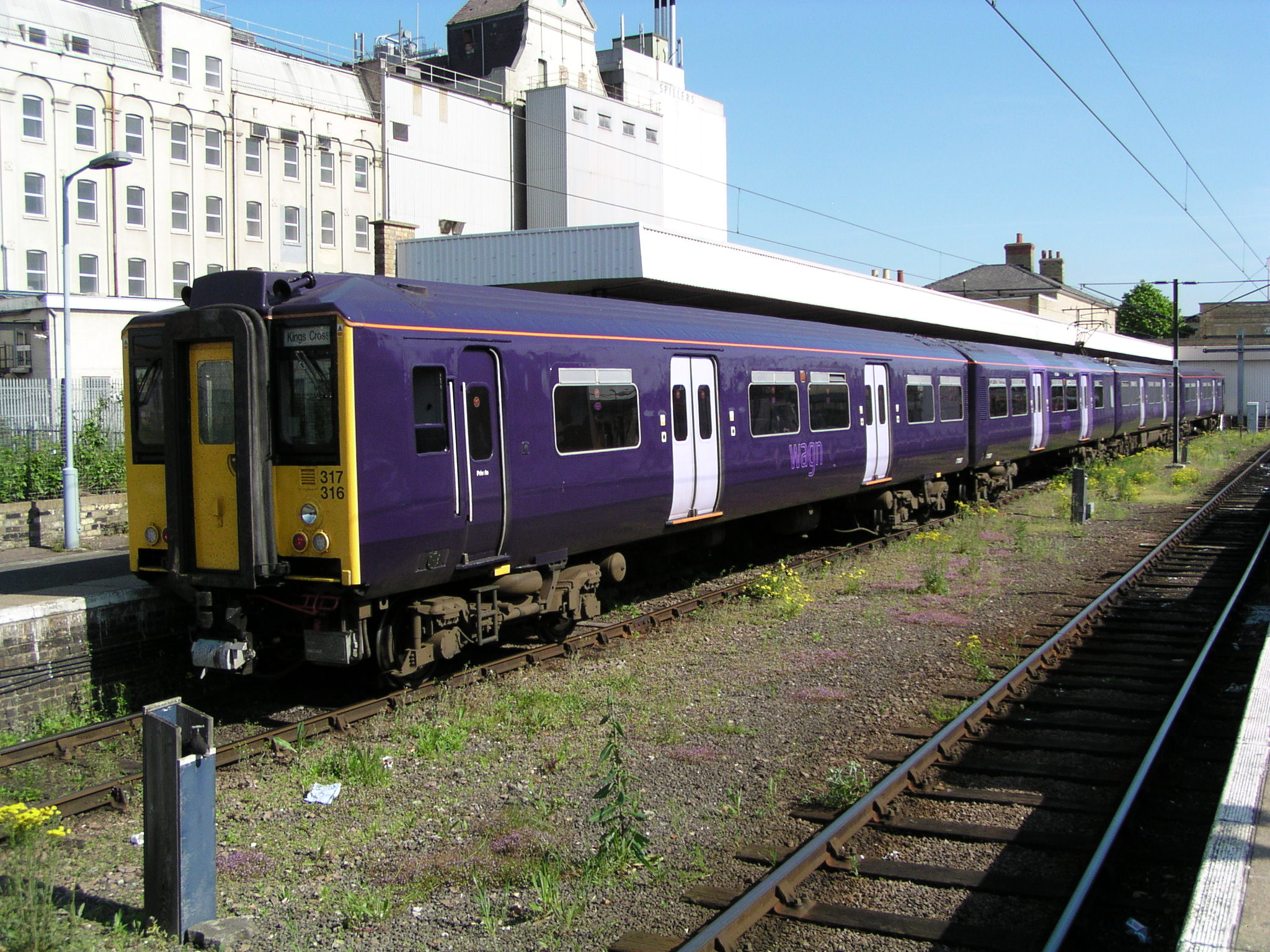
- Class 317 at Cambridge in 2004

Overview
- Franchises: West Anglia Great Northern: 5 January 1997 – 31 March 2004; Great Northern only: 1 April 2004 – 31 March 2006
- Main region: East of England
- Other regions: Greater London (north and north-east)
- Fleet: 145
- Stations called at: 55
- Parent company: Prism Rail (1997–2000); National Express (2000–2006)
- Reporting mark: WN
- Successors: One; First Capital Connect

West Anglia Great Northern, commonly shortened to WAGN, was a British train operating company. It operated the West Anglia Great Northern franchise between January 1997 and March 2004, as well as the Great Northern franchise between April 2004 and March 2006. It was initially owned by Prism Rail, and was subsequently acquired by the British transport conglomerate National Express.

The West Anglia Great Northern franchise was created as part of the privatisation of British Rail, the recently founded company Prism Rail successfully bid for it, being awarded a seven year concession for its operation during December 1996. It took over operations from British Rail on 5 January 1997. The company set about overhauling its inherited rolling stock, such as the Class 313 and Class 317 electric multiple units. By 1999, WAGN was amongst the best performing franchises according to statistics compiled by the Office of Passenger Rail Franchising. However, proposed open access services between Peterborough and Doncaster by WAGN were rejected by the Office of Rail Regulation (ORR) due to a lack of capacity.

During July 2000, Prism Rail, along with WAGN, was acquired by the British transport conglomerate National Express via a £166 million deal. In January 2002, as part of a wider reorganisation of the various franchises conducted by the Strategic Rail Authority (SRA), it was announced that the franchise would be divided, and that the West Anglia portion would be merged into the Greater Anglia franchise. On 10 May 2002, a northbound WAGN service derailed at Potters Bar, resulting the deaths of seven people and the injury of a further 76; services were heavily disrupted and special measures were implemented in response. In December 2005, the Department for Transport (DfT) awarded the recently created Thameslink franchise to rival company FirstGroup, thus the services operated by WAGN were transferred to the new operator First Capital Connect on 1 April 2006.

== History ==
Corporate logos used by WAGN

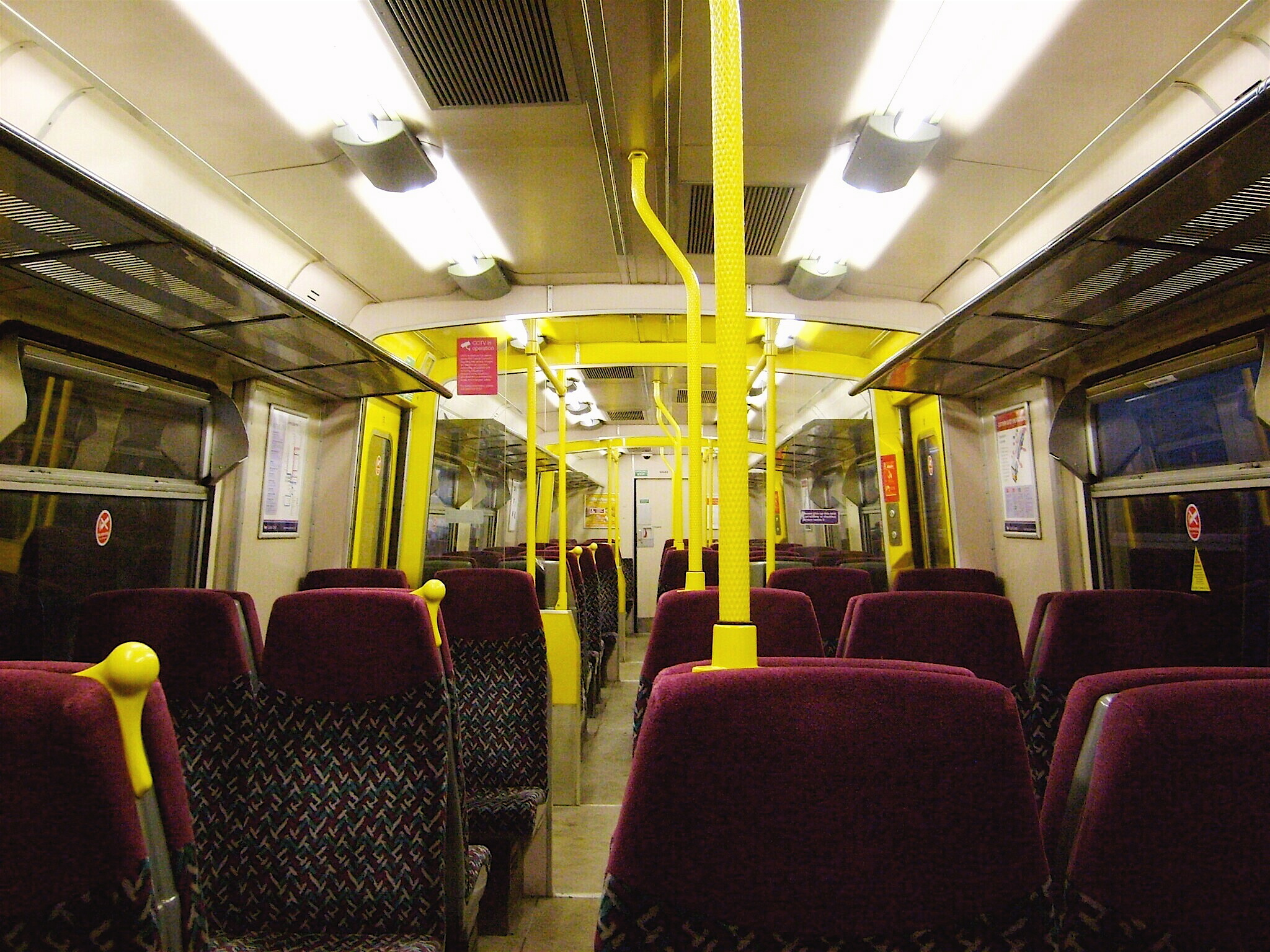
Interior of a refurbished Class 313

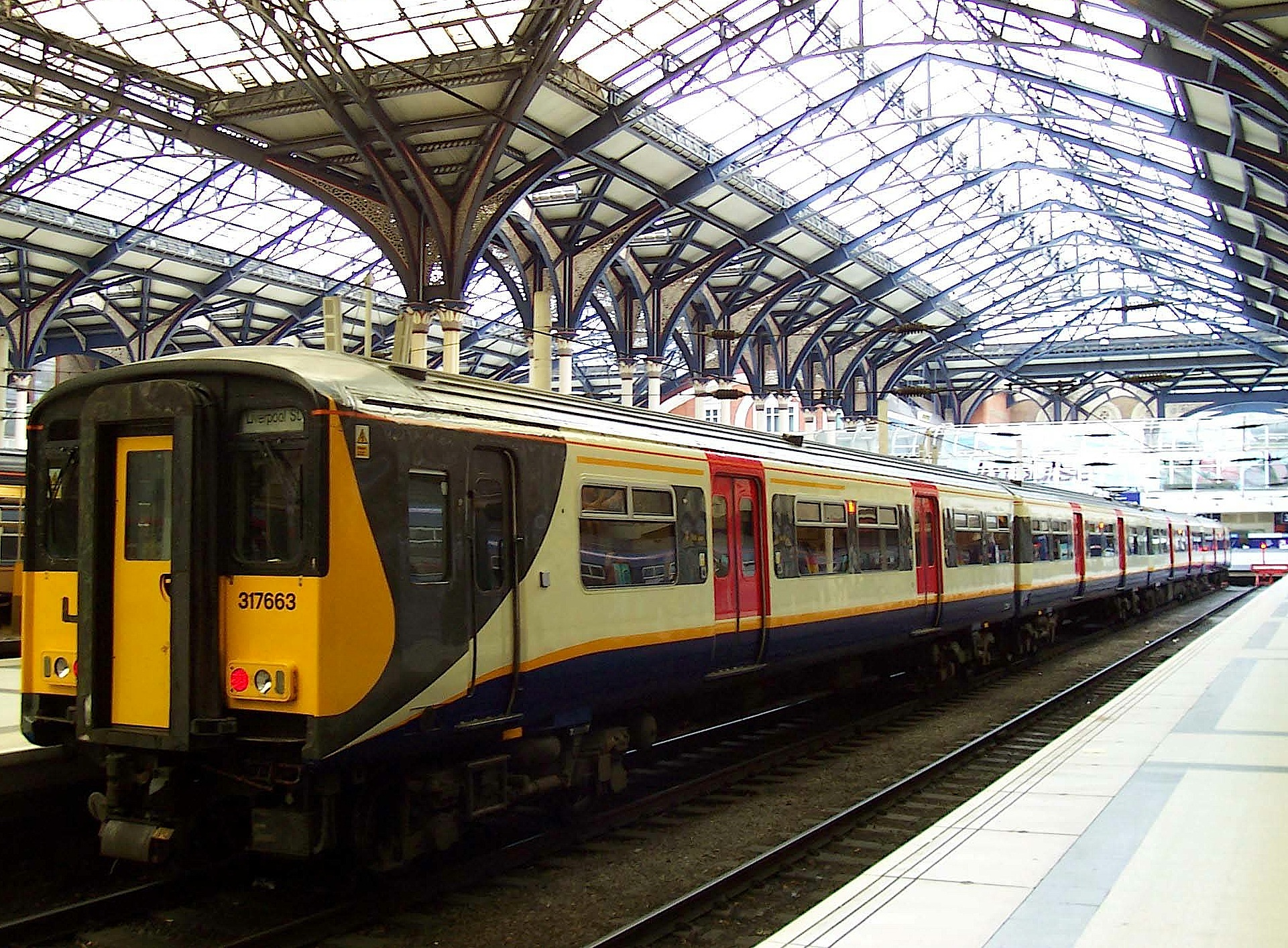
Refurbished Class 317 in the original WAGN livery at Liverpool Street station in 2006

During 1995, amid the privatisation of British Rail, several individuals from the bus industry decided to found their own company, Prism Rail, to bid for some of the newly created rail franchises. In its bid for the West Anglia Great Northern franchise, Prism promised that it would make a premium payment of £24.8 million to the franchising office in 2004. During December 1996, it was announced that Prism had been awarded a seven year concession to operate the franchise, which was the company's fourth awarding of a passenger train franchise at that time.

On 5 January 1997, West Anglia Great Northern commenced operations, taking over service from British Rail, including their rolling stock. During the late 1990s, West Anglia Great Northern submitted an application to operate extended services on an open access basis between Peterborough and Doncaster; however, the proposal was rejected by the Office of Rail Regulation (ORR) due to a reported lack of capacity on the route.

By 1999, according to statistics compiled by the Office of Passenger Rail Franchising, West Anglia Great Northern was amongst the best performing franchises, being one of only seven franchises to obtain a B grade, for which its average punctuality had to be above 90 per cent while its average reliability figures had to exceed 99 per cent.

During July 2000, it was announced that Prism Rail, and thus West Anglia Great Northern as well, had been acquired by the British transport conglomerate National Express in exchange for £166 million. That same month, the company had agreed to invest £20.5m into the network, and had reported that the Great Northern portion of the franchise' operations were running at a profit.

In January 2002, as part of a wider reorganisation of the various franchises conducted by the Strategic Rail Authority (SRA), it was announced that the franchise would be divided, and that the West Anglia portion would be merged into the Greater Anglia franchise. During December 2003, the SRA awarded the Greater Anglia franchise to National Express, resulting in the transfer of the West Anglia services to One on 1 April 2004. The company was also granted a two-year extension on the West Anglia Great Northern franchise; thereafter, the Great Northern services were retained with the company commonly referring to itself as WAGN rather than West Anglia Great Northern.

On 10 May 2002, a major rail accident involving a northbound WAGN service occurred at Potters Bar, resulting the deaths of seven people and the injury of a further 76. The train, a four-coach Class 365 Electric multiple unit, had derailed while passing over a set of points just south of Potters Bar railway station at 97 mph (156 km/h); these points had unintentionally moved while still underneath the third coach. In the aftermath of the accident, WAGN services were heavily disrupted and delayed, leading to a special timetable being implemented for a time. During April 2004, the railway infrastructure services company Jarvis plc admitting liability for the accident.

== Services ==
West Anglia Great Northern operated all-stops and limited stops West Anglia services out of London Liverpool Street to Chingford, Enfield Town, Hertford East, Stansted Airport, and Cambridge, and all-stops and limited stops Great Northern services out of London King's Cross to Cambridge, King's Lynn and Peterborough, including the Hertford North loop line.

== Rolling stock ==
West Anglia Great Northern inherited a fleet of Class 313s, Class 315s, Class 317s, Class 322s and Class 365s from British Rail.

Between 1997 and 1999, two of the five Class 322 electric multiple units were loaned to First North Western, after which all five units were transferred to ScotRail during 2001.

The first trains to undergo overhaul work were twenty-four Class 317/2 multiple units; these were adapted to be more suitable for long-distance use, changes included the installation of lower-density seats throughout, an improved first class area, the addition of carpet, and repainting. Dedicated bicycle and wheelchair spaces and improved lighting were also provided, while the exterior received a new white, grey, blue and red livery.

West Anglia Great Northern also opted to improve its suburban trains, such as the Class 313 multiple units, which gained new seats with higher backs, provisions for wheelchair users, and minor improvements to fittings such as stanchions in the passenger areas. These emerged from refurbishment at Railcare, Wolverton in a plain white undercoat, before a metallic purple livery was introduced in 2001.

Between 1999 and 2000, nine Class 317/1s were refurbished for use on the dedicated Stansted Express service, they were reclassified Class 317/7. These multiple units featured improved interiors and a new metallic blue Stansted Express livery.

During 2004, sixteen Class 365s were transferred to WAGN from South Eastern Trains. Before their entry into service, these multiple units had their original DC shoe gear removed and pantographs fitted instead.

Fleet at end of franchise
Class	Image	Type	Top speed		Number	Built	Notes
Class	Image	Type	mph	km/h	Number	Built	Notes
03		Diesel–mechanical locomotive	28.5	45.9	1	1962	03179 "Clive", used as shunter at Hornsey TMD
313		EMU	75	120	41	1976–1977	Moorgate/London King's Cross – Hertford North, Letchworth Garden City and Welwyn Garden City
315		EMU	75	120	18	1980–1981	Liverpool Street – Chingford, Cheshunt and Enfield Town; Liverpool Street – Hertford East (peak times and Sundays only)
317		EMU	100	160	72	1981–1982; 1985–1987	London King's Cross – Cambridge; Liverpool Street – Cambridge, Hertford East and Stansted Airport; Stratford – Stansted Airport
365		EMU	100	160	40	1994–1995	London King's Cross – Cambridge, King's Lynn and Peterborough; 25 originally; one written off in the Potters Bar rail accident of 2002; 16 added in 2004 and 2006 from South Eastern Trains

== Depots ==
West Anglia Great Northern's fleet was maintained at Hornsey and Ilford depots.

== Demise ==
As part of a franchise reorganisation by the Strategic Rail Authority, the Great Northern services were merged into the Thameslink franchise. In December 2005, the Department for Transport awarded the Thameslink franchise to FirstGroup with the services operated by West Anglia Great Northern transferring to First Capital Connect on 1 April 2006.

Preceded by Network SouthEast; As part of British Rail	Operator of West Anglia Great Northern franchise West Anglia 1997 – 2004; Great Northern 1997 – 2006	Succeeded by One; Greater Anglia franchise from 2004
Preceded by Network SouthEast; As part of British Rail	Operator of West Anglia Great Northern franchise West Anglia 1997 – 2004; Great Northern 1997 – 2006	Succeeded by First Capital Connect; Thameslink and Great Northern franchise from 2006
