= GB Railways =

British railway operator

GB Railways Group plc
- Industry: Rail
- Founded: October 1996
- Defunct: August 2003
- Fate: Purchased by FirstGroup
- Headquarters: London, United Kingdom
- Key people: Michael Schabas; Jeremy Long; Jim Morgan; Max Steinkopf
- Services: Passenger transportation Freight transportation
- Subsidiaries: Anglia Railways; Hull Trains (80%); GB Railfreight
- Website: www.gbrailways.com

GB Railways was the parent company of a number of train operating companies, running the Anglia Railways franchise from January 1997 and launching Hull Trains and GB Railfreight. GB Railways was also involved in the management of the Estonian rail company Edelaraudtee and had an investment in Great Southern Rail in Australia.

The company was acquired by FirstGroup in August 2003.

== History ==
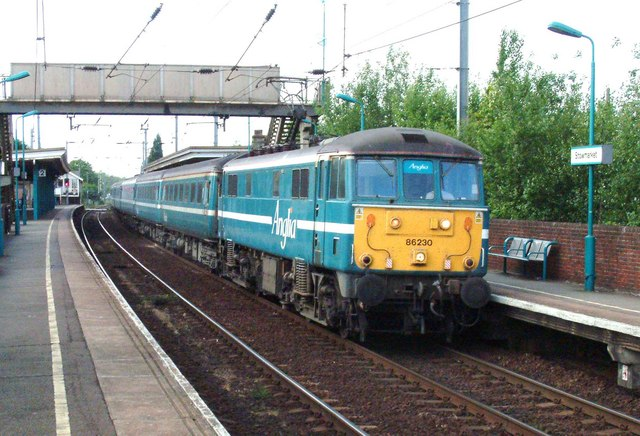
Anglia Railways 86230 at Stowmarket with a Liverpool Street bound service

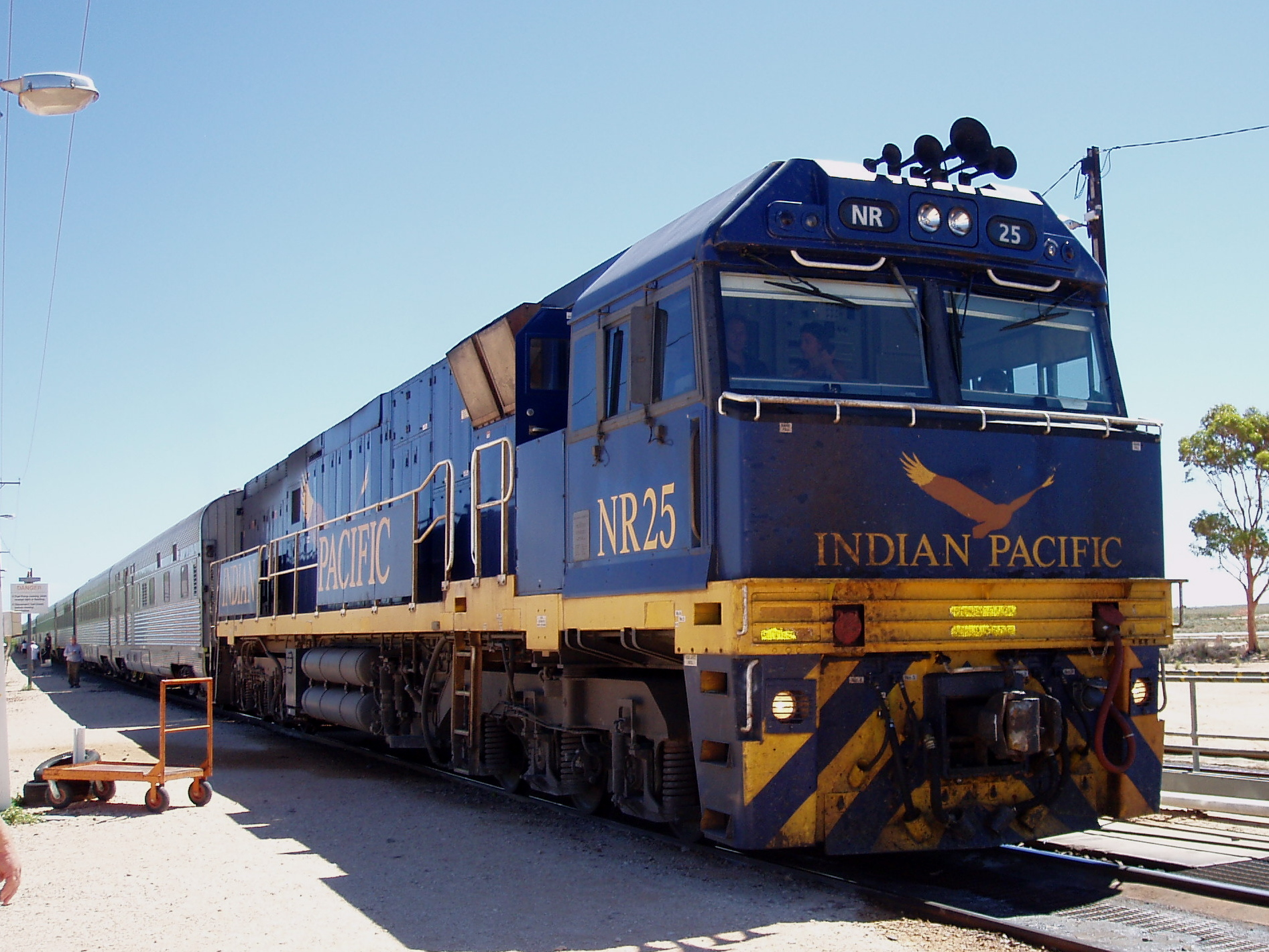
Indian Pacific at Cook, South Australia

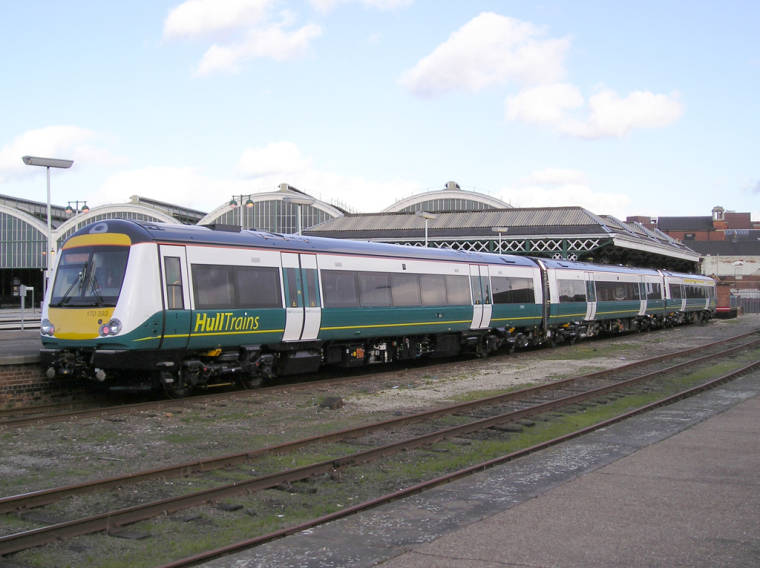
Hull Trains 170393 at Hull

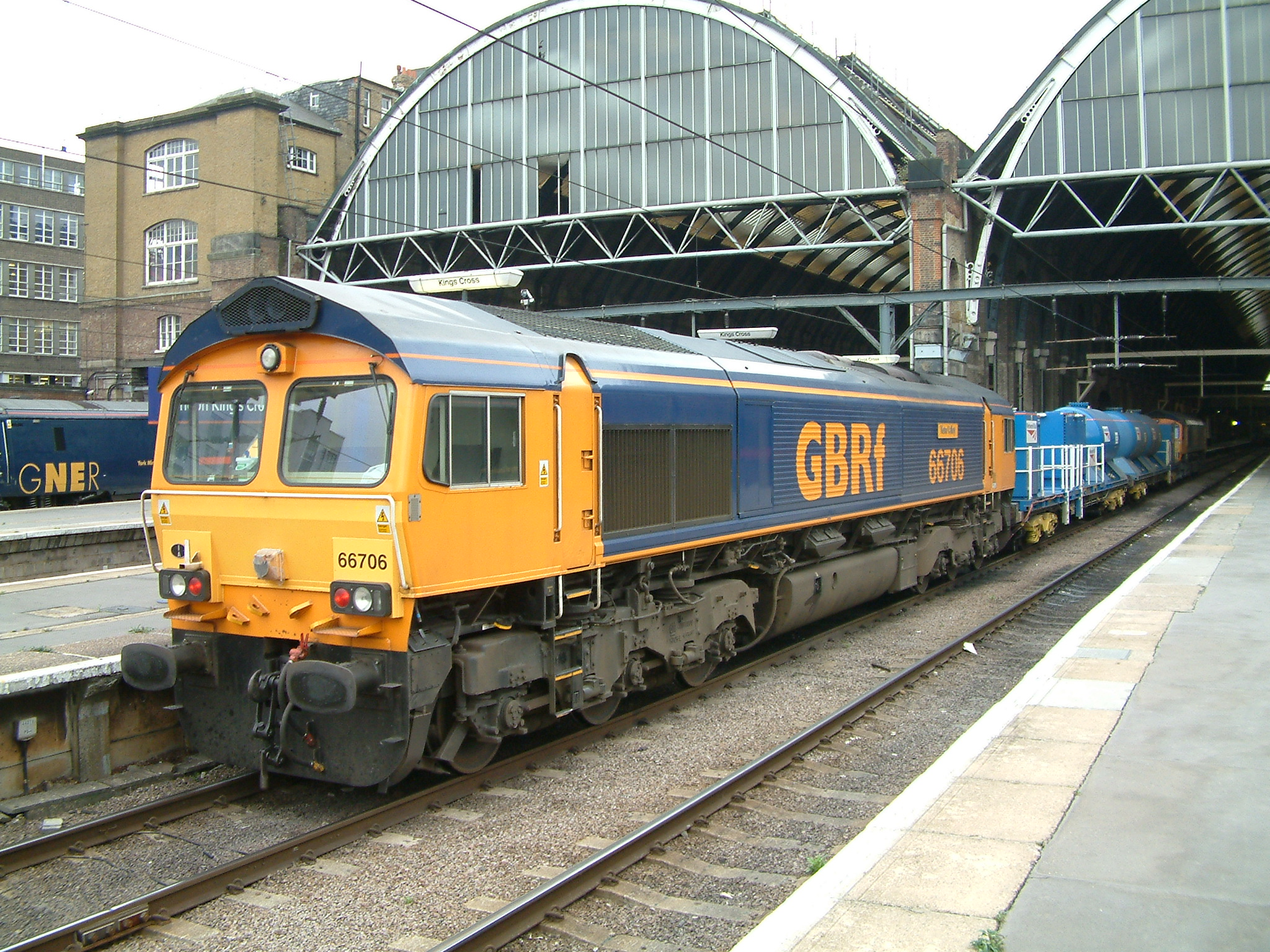
GB Railfreight 66706 at London King's Cross

GB Railways was formed in October 1996 by entrepreneurs with diverse backgrounds initially to bid for rail franchises in the United Kingdom during the privatisation of British Rail. After being awarded the Anglia franchise in 1996, GB Railways was listed on the Alternative Investment Market in January 1997.

In October 1997 as part of the Great Southern Railway Consortium with Legal & General, Macquarie Bank, RailAmerica, G13 Pty Ltd and Serco, it acquired the interstate passenger services of Australian National Railways, which were operated as Great Southern Rail. In 1998 GB Railways, as part of the Inter Capital Express consortium, was shortlisted for a high-speed rail service from Sydney to Canberra. In September 2000 GB Railways, as part of the Western Freight consortium with AMEC Engineering, lodged a bid for the Westrail freight business in Western Australia.

In October 1999 the company announced the sale of its 19.7% share in Great Southern Rail to Serco.

In September 2000 GB Railways launched Hull Trains (with an 80% shareholding), an open access InterCity rail operator running trains between Hull and London King's Cross.

In November 2000 GB Railways acquired an interest in the Estonian passenger rail operator Edelaraudtee through Estonian subsidiary GB Railways Eesti AS, for 10million Kroon ($540,000), with investment and stock increase deals over five years as part of the agreement. GB Railways owned 20% of the shares, with the majority owners being Edelaraudtee chairman Henn Ruubel and lawyer Marcel Vichmann. In 2002 GB Railways investment in the company was only £70,000 – it provided management to the company on a fee basis.

GB Railways launched freight train operating company GB Railfreight in March 2001.

In 2001 the company was rumoured to be in takeover talks with potential suitors. The company's services were badly affected by the speed restrictions imposed on all train operators by Railtrack after the Hatfield rail crash, and was making a net loss despite receiving an increased subsidy from the Strategic Rail Authority.

In 2002 a consortium of GNER and Freightliner attempted to acquire the company, valuing it at around £1 per share, or £8.75 million; GNER sought the passenger trains operations, whilst Freightliner sought the GB Railfreight subsidiary. The offer was rejected without discussion and the companies ceased the acquisition attempt.

In July 2003 FirstGroup made a successful takeover offer for GB Railways, offering £2.50 per share offer. There was a further deferred consideration of £2.00 if the Greater Anglia franchise was won and £0.50 if either the Northern Rail or Wales & Borders franchises were won, however none of these franchise bids were successful.

=== Legacy ===
Hull Trains continued as a subsidiary of FirstGroup, being rebranded First Hull Trains in 2008. FirstGroup sold GB Railfreight to Eurotunnel in June 2010.
