= Strategic Rail Authority =

Former non-departmental public body for rail in the United Kingdom

- Type: non-departmental public body
- Industry: Railway transport
- Founded: 2001
- Defunct: 2006
- Fate: Abolished
- Successor: Department for Transport
- Headquarters: London, United Kingdom
- Area served: Great Britain

The Strategic Rail Authority (SRA) was a non-departmental public body in the United Kingdom set up under the Transport Act 2000 to provide strategic direction for the railway industry. Its motto was 'Britain's railway, properly delivered'. It was abolished by the Railways (Abolition of the Strategic Rail Authority) Order 2006, with its functions absorbed by the Department for Transport or the Office of Rail Regulation (now the Office of Rail and Road).

== Establishment ==
The Shadow SRA was established in 1999 following the election of the Labour government in 1997 in an attempt to increase public interest regulation of the fragmented railway network following the privatisation of British Rail. It incorporated the former Conservative government's Director of Passenger Rail Franchising. Its main function was awarding and ensuring compliance with passenger rail franchises – contracts between the state and private sector operators under which the operators committed to provide certain levels of service in return for public subsidies; some franchises were cash-positive, which meant that the operator paid the SRA for the right to provide the services. The SRA's other functions were concerned with the financial support of other unviable services, such as the giving of grants to support marginal rail freight services and the building of freight facilities.

The SRA was placed on a formal legal basis by the Transport Act 2000 and came into existence on 1 February 2001.

The government wanted the SRA to take a more interventionist role with Railtrack and its successor Network Rail, but never gave it the legal powers to do so. Those powers rested with the Rail Regulator as a statutory office holder, who frequently clashed with the SRA when he believed that it was over-reaching its jurisdiction.

The SRA operated under directions and guidance from the Secretary of State for Transport, also in Scotland from the Scottish Minister for Transport and in Greater London from the Mayor of London.

In Scotland the budget of the SRA was devolved to the Scottish Parliament under the terms of the Barnett Formula.

The SRA's first chairman was Sir Alastair Morton, from February 1999 until October 2001. Its first chief executive was Mike Grant. Its second chairman (and also chief executive) was Richard Bowker, who served between October 2001 and September 2004. Its third chairman was David Quarmby, and third chief executive Nick Newton, from September 2004 to abolition.

== Abolition ==
On 15 July 2004 the Secretary of State for Transport, Alistair Darling MP, announced that the SRA was to be abolished within the next 12–18 months. Following the passing of the Railways Act 2005 it was wound up on 1 December 2006, and its functions transferred to the Department for Transport Rail Group, to the Network Rail and to the Office of Rail Regulation. The Scottish Executive, the Welsh Assembly Government and the Greater London Authority were given some input in their areas.

== See also ==
- UK enterprise law
