= Edinburgh Castle =

Historic castle in Edinburgh, Scotland

- Castlehill, Edinburgh in Scotland
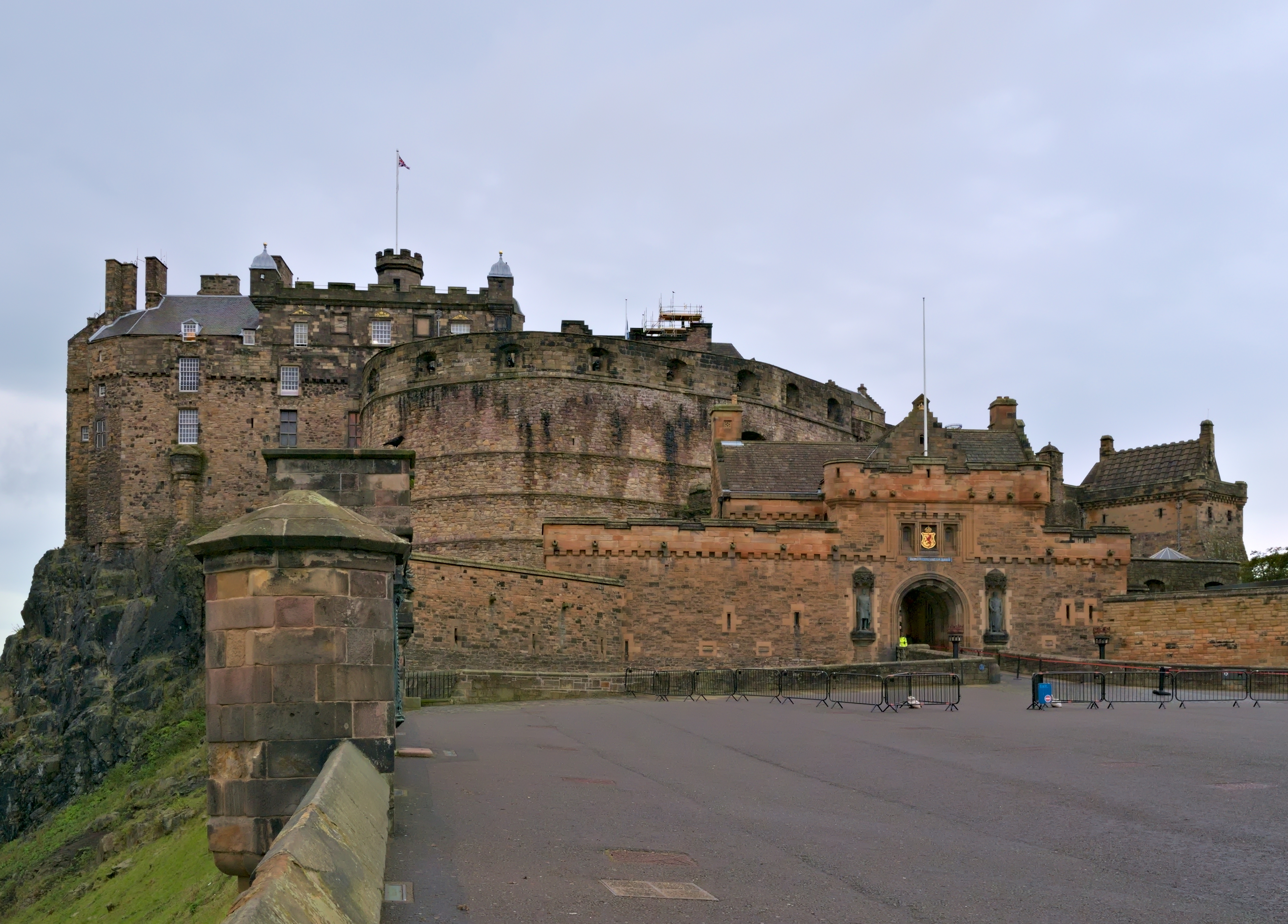
- Frontage view of Edinburgh Castle

- Logo of Edinburgh Castle

Site information
- Type: Visitor attraction and British Army regimental headquarters
- Owner: Scottish Ministers
- Operator: Historic Environment Scotland and British Army
- Open to the public: Yes
- Visitor numbers: 2,044,963 (2025)
- Website: www.edinburghcastle.scot

Location
- Location in Edinburgh
- Coordinates: 55°56′55″N 3°12′3″W

Site history
- Built: 11th century through to the 21st century
- Battles/wars: Wars of Scottish Independence (1296–1357); Siege to free James III of Scotland (1482); Lang Siege (1571–1573)
- Events: Royal Edinburgh Military Tattoo (annual)

Garrison information
- Current commander: Major General Bob Bruce
- Past commanders: List of governors of Edinburgh Castle

Scheduled monument
- Designated: 17 May 1993
- Reference no.: SM90130

Edinburgh Castle (Scottish Gaelic: Caisteal Dhùn Èideann) is a historic castle in Edinburgh, Scotland. It stands on Castle Rock, which has been occupied by humans since at least the Iron Age. There has been a royal castle on the rock since the reign of Malcolm III in the 11th century, and the castle continued to be a royal residence until 1633. From the 15th century, the castle's residential role declined, and by the 17th century it was principally used as a military garrison. Its importance as a part of Scotland's national heritage was recognised increasingly from the early 19th century onwards, and various restoration programmes have been carried out since the middle of the 19th century.

Edinburgh Castle has played a prominent role in Scottish history, and has served variously as a royal residence, an arsenal, a treasury, a national archive, a mint, a prison, a military fortress, and the home of the Honours of Scotland – the Scottish regalia. As one of the most important strongholds in the Kingdom of Scotland, the castle was involved in many historical conflicts from the Wars of Scottish Independence in the 14th century to the Jacobite rising of 1745. Research undertaken in 2014 identified 26 sieges in its 1,100-year history, giving it a claim to having been "the most besieged place in Great Britain and one of the most attacked in the world". Few of the present buildings pre-date the Lang Siege of 1573, when the medieval defences were largely destroyed by artillery bombardment. The most notable exceptions are St Margaret's Chapel from the early 12th century, which is regarded as the oldest building in Edinburgh, the Royal Palace, and the early 16th-century Great Hall. The castle is the site of the Scottish National War Memorial and the National War Museum. The British Army is still responsible for some parts of the castle, although its presence is now largely ceremonial and administrative. The castle is the regimental headquarters of the Royal Regiment of Scotland and the Royal Scots Dragoon Guards and houses their regimental museums, along with that of the Royal Scots.

The castle, in the care of Historic Environment Scotland, is Scotland's second most visited tourist attraction, with 2,044,963 visitors in 2025 and over 70 percent of leisure visitors to Edinburgh visiting the castle. As the backdrop to the Royal Edinburgh Military Tattoo during the annual Edinburgh Festival, the castle has become a recognisable symbol of Edinburgh in particular and of Scotland as a whole.

== History ==
=== Pre-history of the Castle Rock ===
==== Geology ====
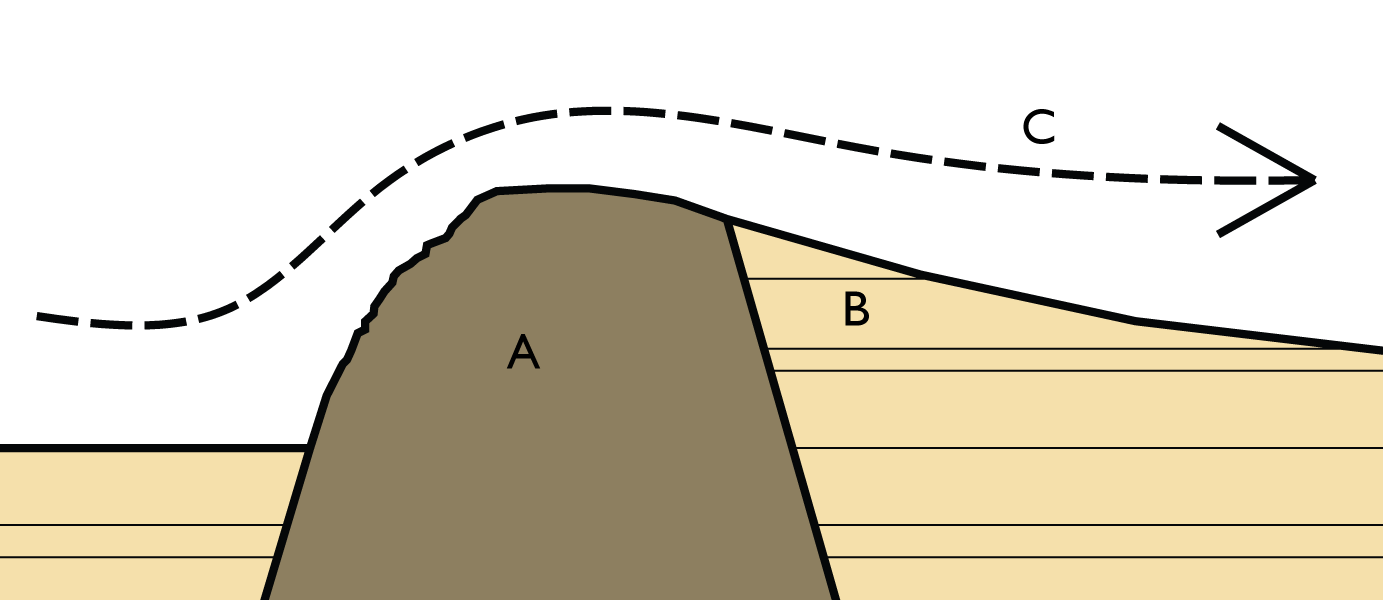
Diagram of a crag and tail feature, such as the Castle Rock: A is the crag formed from the volcanic plug, B is the tail of softer rock, and C shows the direction of ice movement. In the case of Edinburgh, the castle stands on the crag (A) with the Royal Mile extending along the tail (B).

The castle stands upon the plug of an extinct volcano, which is estimated to have risen about 350 million years ago during the lower Carboniferous period. The Castle Rock is the remains of a volcanic pipe, which cut through the surrounding sedimentary rock before cooling to form very hard dolerite, a type of basalt. Subsequent glacial erosion was resisted by the dolerite, which protected the softer rock to the east, leaving a crag and tail formation.

The summit of the Castle Rock is 130 metres (430 ft) above sea level, with rocky cliffs to the south, west, and north, rising to a height of 80 metres (260 ft) above the surrounding landscape. This means that the only readily accessible route to the castle lies to the east, where the ridge slopes more gently. The defensive advantage of such a site is self-evident, but the geology of the rock also presents difficulties, since basalt is extremely impermeable. Providing water to the Upper Ward of the castle was problematic, and despite the sinking of a 34-metre (112 ft) deep well, the water supply often ran out during drought or siege, including during the Lang Siege in 1573.

==== Earliest habitation ====
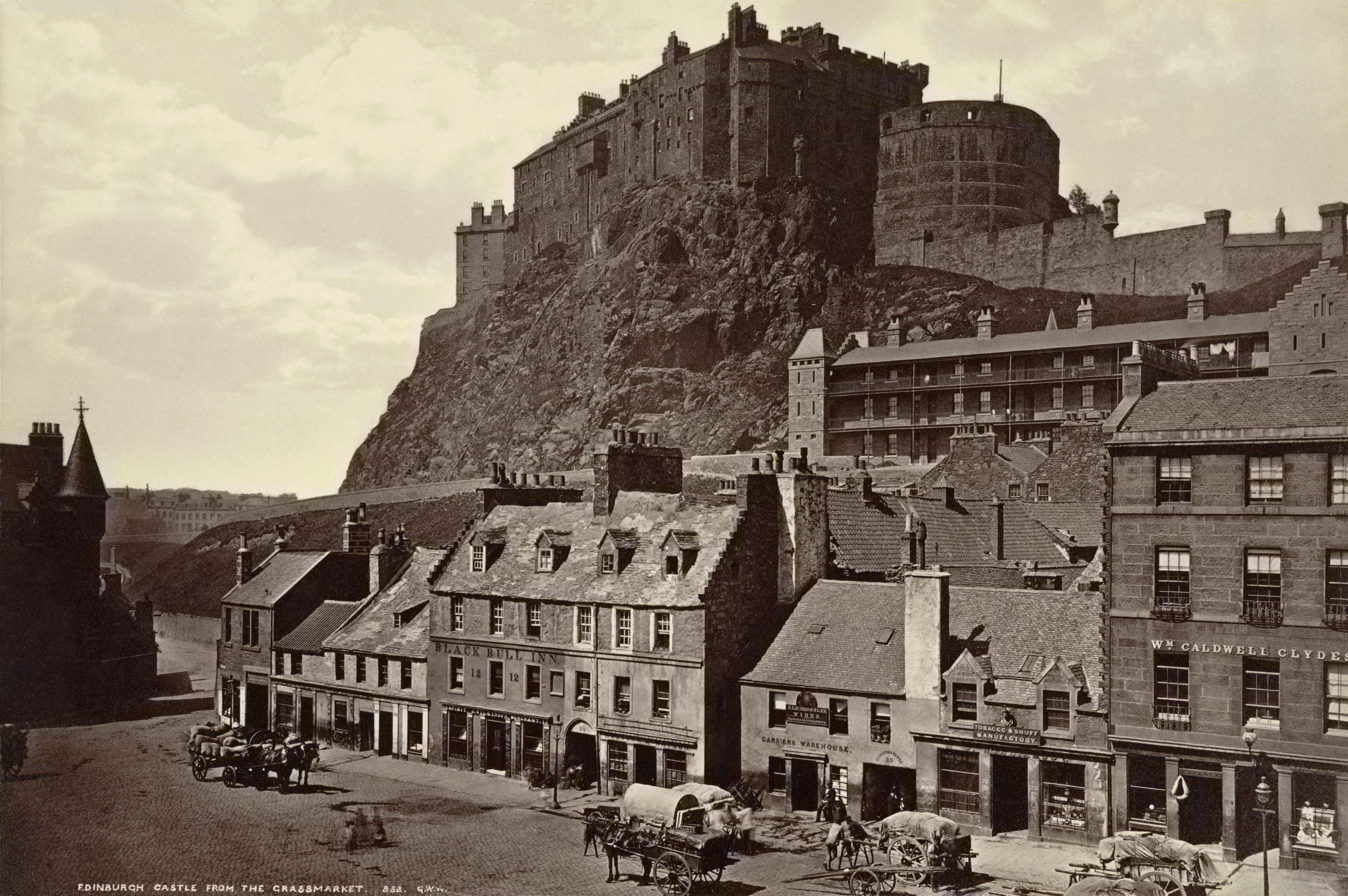
The castle is built on a volcanic rock, as seen here in a 19th-century view from the Grassmarket area.

An archaeological investigation has yet to establish when the Castle Rock was first used for human habitation. There is no record of any Roman interest in the location during General Agricola's invasion of northern Britain near the end of the 1st century AD. Ptolemy's map of the 2nd century AD shows a settlement in the territory of the Votadini named "Alauna", meaning "rock place", making this possibly the earliest known name for the Castle Rock. This could, however, refer to another of the tribe's hill forts in the area. The Orygynale Cronykil of Andrew of Wyntoun (c. 1350 – c. 1423), an early source for Scottish history, names "Ebrawce" (Ebraucus), a legendary King of the Britons, as having "byggyd [built] Edynburgh". According to the earlier chronicler, Geoffrey of Monmouth (c. 1100 – c. 1155), Ebraucus had fifty children by his twenty wives, and was the founder of "Kaerebrauc" (York), "Alclud" (Dumbarton) and the "Maidens' Castle". The 16th-century English writer John Stow (c. 1525 – 1605), credited Ebraucus with building "the Castell of Maidens called Edenbrough" in 989 BC. The name "Maidens' Castle" (Latin: Castra or Castellum Puellarum) occurs frequently up until the 16th century. It appears in charters of David I (r. 1124–1153) and his successors in the Kingdom of Scotland, although the reason for it is not known. William Camden's survey of Britain, Britannia (1607), records that "the Britans called [it] Castle Myned Agned [winged rock], the Scots, the Maidens Castle and the Virgins Castle, of certaine young maidens of the Picts roiall bloud who were kept there in old time". According to the 17th-century antiquarian Father Richard Hay, the "maidens" were a group of nuns, who were ejected from the castle and replaced by canons, considered "fitter to live among soldiers". However, this story was considered "apocryphal" by the 19th-century antiquarian Daniel Wilson and has been ignored by historians since. The name may have been derived from a "Cult of the Nine Maidens" type of legend. Arthurian legends suggest that the site once held a shrine to Morgain la Fee, one of nine sisters. Later, St Monenna, said to be one of nine companions, reputedly invested a church at Edinburgh, as well as at Dumbarton and other places. Similar names are shared by many other Iron Age hillforts and may have simply described a castle that had never been taken by force or derived from an earlier Brittonic name like mag dun.

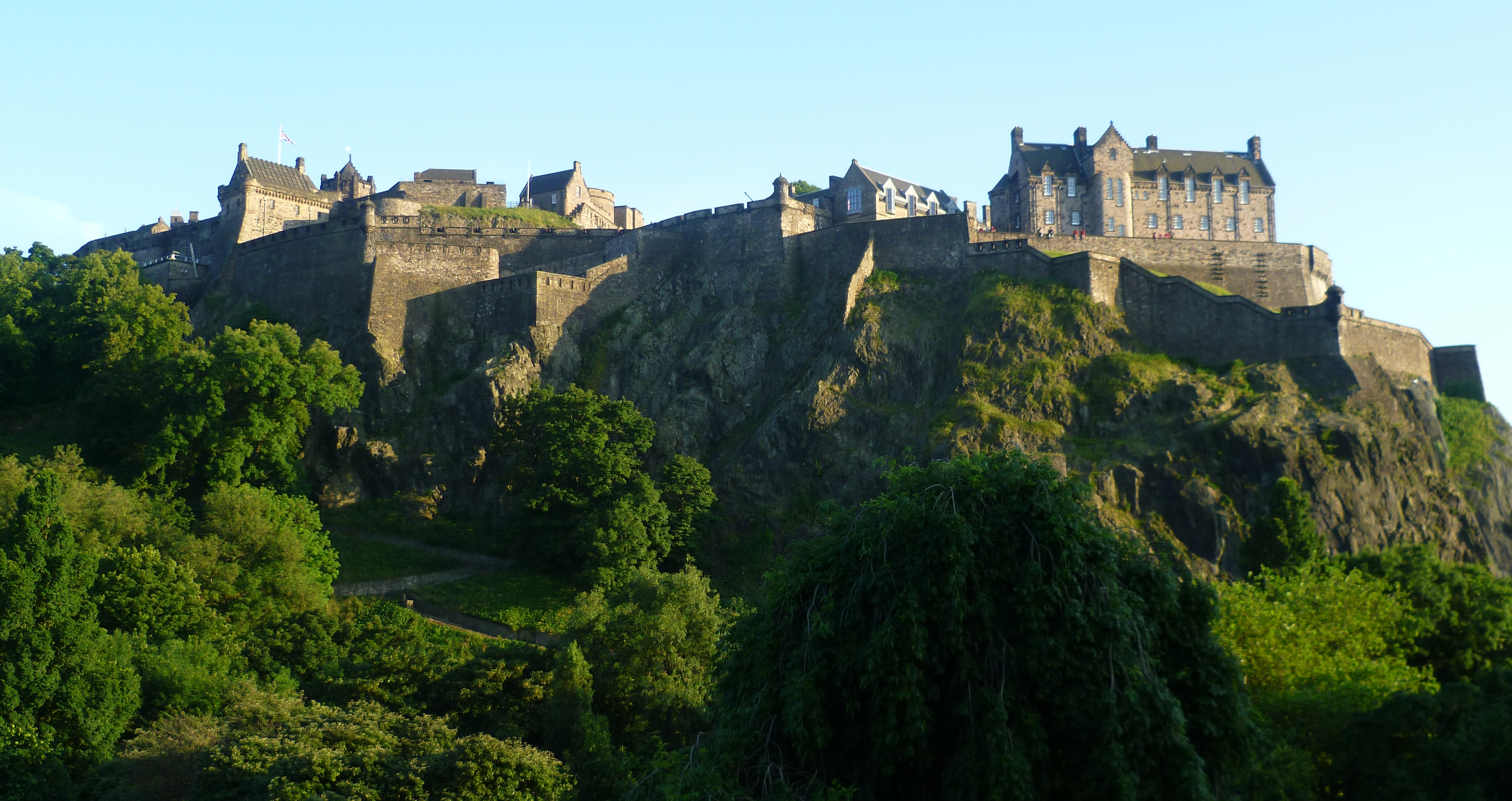
The Castle seen from the North

An archaeological excavation in the early 1990s uncovered evidence of the site having been settled during the late Bronze Age or early Iron Age, potentially making Castle Rock the longest continuously occupied site in Scotland. However, the extent of the finds was not particularly significant and insufficient to draw any certain conclusions about the precise nature or scale of this earliest known phase of occupation.

The archaeological evidence is more reliable concerning the Iron Age. Traditionally, it had been supposed that the tribes of central Scotland had made little or no use of the Castle Rock. Excavations at nearby Dunsapie Hill, Duddingston, Inveresk and Traprain Law had revealed relatively large settlements and it was supposed that these sites had been chosen in preference to the Castle Rock. However, the excavation in the 1990s pointed to the probable existence of an enclosed hillfort on the rock, although only the fringes of the site were excavated. House fragments revealed were similar to Iron Age dwellings previously found in Northumbria.

The 1990s dig revealed clear signs of habitation from the 1st and 2nd centuries AD, consistent with Ptolemy's reference to "Alauna". Signs of occupation included some Roman material, including pottery, bronzes and brooches, implying a possible trading relationship between the Votadini and the Romans beginning with Agricola's northern campaign in AD 82, and continuing through to the establishment of the Antonine Wall around AD 140. The nature of the settlement in this period is inconclusive, but Driscoll and Yeoman suggest it may have been a broch, similar to the one at Edin's Hall near Duns in the Scottish Borders.

=== Early Middle Ages ===
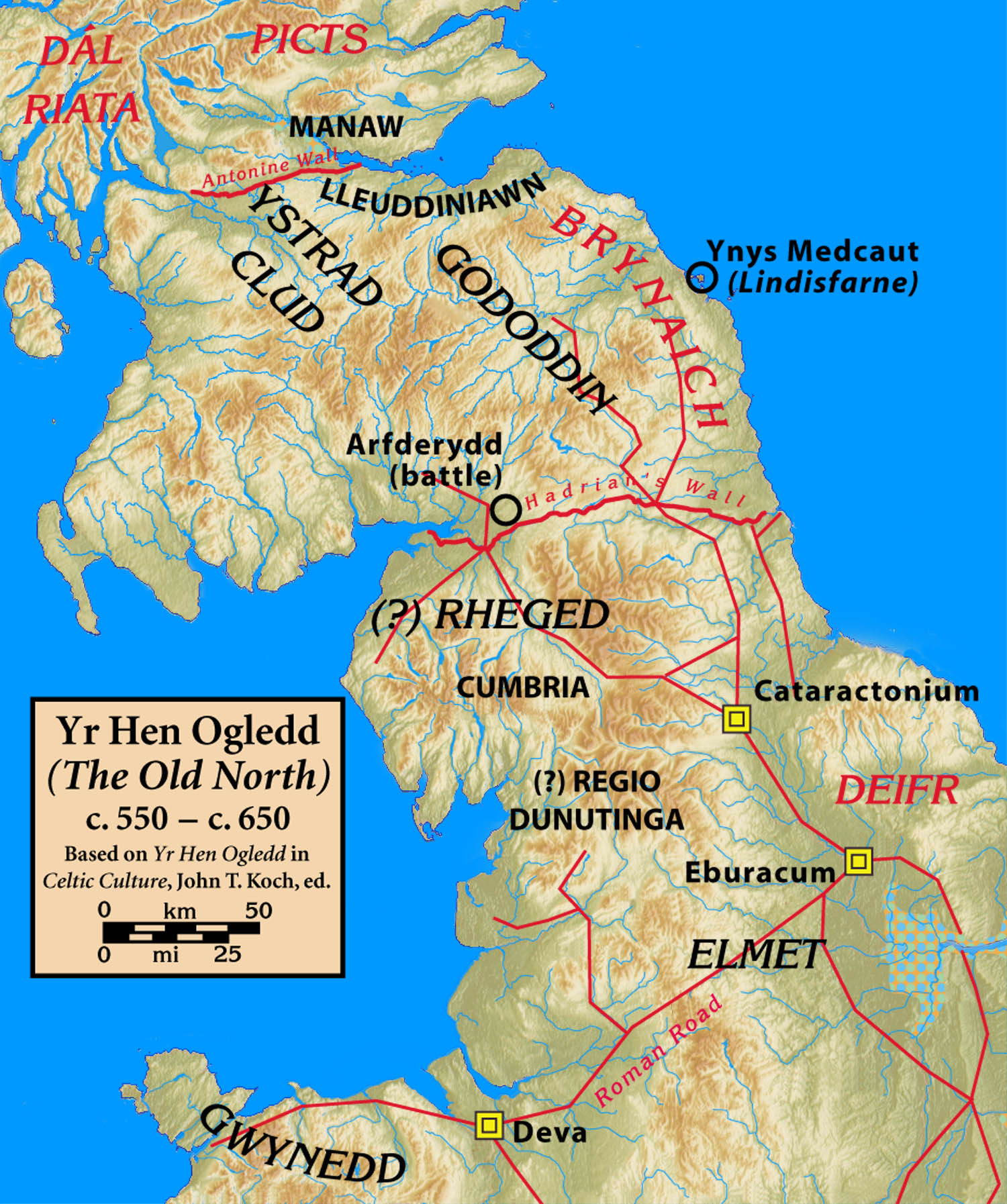
Map of northern Britain showing the Gododdin and other tribes c.600 AD

The castle does not re-appear in contemporary historical records from the time of Ptolemy until around AD 600. Then, in the epic Welsh poem Y Gododdin there is a reference to Din Eidyn, "the stronghold of Eidyn". This has been generally assumed to refer to the Castle Rock. The poem tells of the Gododdin King Mynyddog Mwynfawr, and his band of warriors, who, after a year of feasting in their fortress, set out to do battle with the Angles at "Catreath" (possibly Catterick) in Yorkshire. Despite performing glorious deeds of valour and bravery, the poem relates that the Gododdin were massacred.

The Irish annals record that in 638, after the events related in Y Gododdin, "Etin" was besieged by the Angles under Oswald of Northumbria, and the Gododdin were defeated. The territory around Edinburgh then became part of the Kingdom of Northumbria, which was itself absorbed by England in the 10th century. Lothian became part of Scotland, during the reign of Indulf (r.954–962).

The archaeological evidence for the period in question is based entirely on the analysis of middens (domestic refuse heaps), with no evidence of structures. Few conclusions can therefore be derived about the status of the settlement during this period, although the midden deposits show no clear break since Roman times.

=== High Middle Ages ===
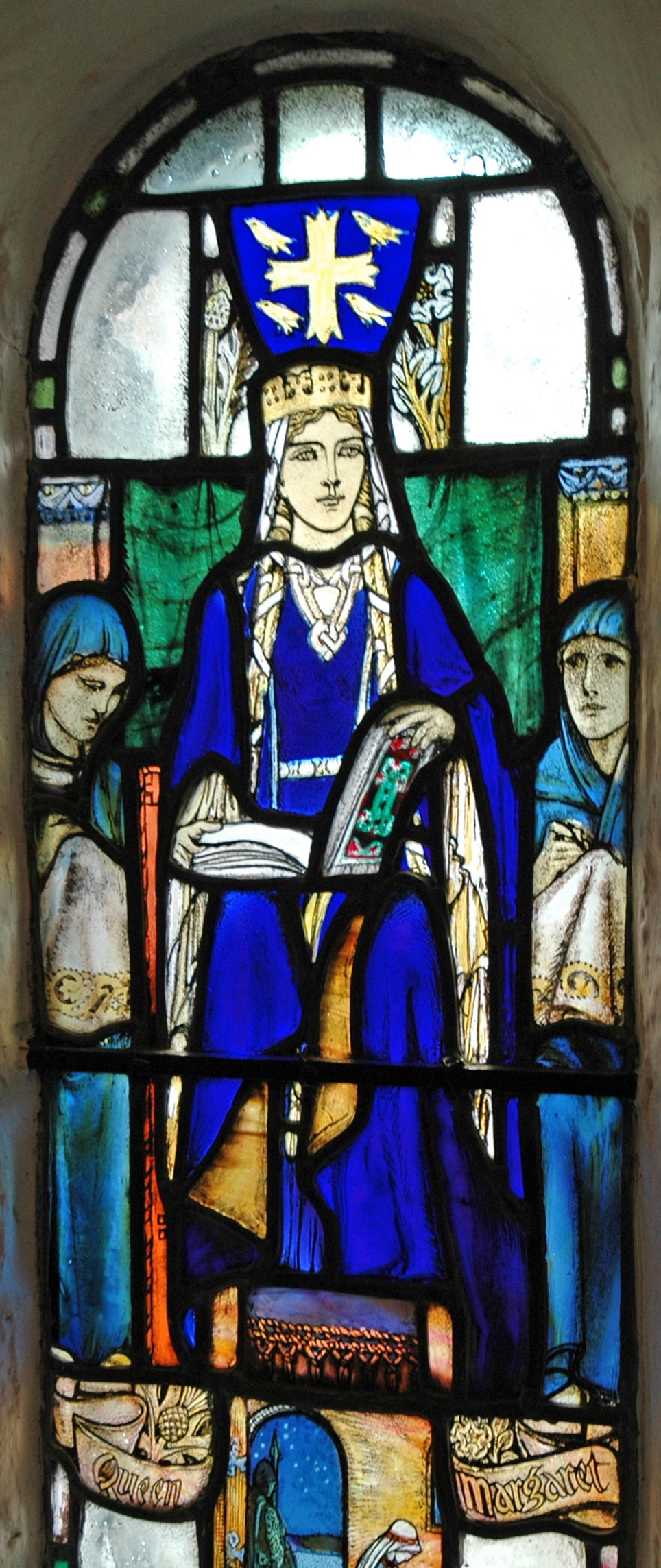
St Margaret, depicted in a stained glass window in the chapel of Edinburgh Castle

The first documentary reference to a castle at Edinburgh is John of Fordun's account of the death of King Malcolm III (1031–1093). Fordun describes his widow, the future Saint Margaret, as residing at the "Castle of Maidens" when she is brought news of his death in November 1093. Fordun's account goes on to relate how Margaret died of grief within days, and how Malcolm's brother Donald Bane laid siege to the castle. However, Fordun's chronicle was not written until the later 14th century, and the near-contemporary account of the life of St Margaret by Bishop Turgot makes no mention of a castle. During the reigns of Malcolm III and his sons, Edinburgh Castle became one of the most significant royal centres in Scotland. Malcolm's son King Edgar died here in 1107.

Malcolm's youngest son, King David I (r.1124–1153), developed Edinburgh as a seat of royal power principally through his administrative reforms (termed by some modern scholars the Davidian Revolution). Between 1139 and 1150, David held an assembly of nobles and churchmen, a precursor to the parliament of Scotland, at the castle. Any buildings or defences would probably have been of timber, although two stone buildings are documented as having existed in the 12th century. Of these, St. Margaret's Chapel remains at the summit of the rock. The second was a church, dedicated to St. Mary, which stood on the site of the Scottish National War Memorial. Given that the southern part of the Upper Ward (where Crown Square is now sited) was not suited to be built upon until the construction of the vaults in the 15th century, it seems probable that any earlier buildings would have been located towards the northern part of the rock; that is around the area where St. Margaret's Chapel stands. This has been suggested that the chapel is the last remnant of a square, stone keep, which would have formed the bulk of the 12th-century fortification. The structure may have been similar to the keep of Carlisle Castle, which David I began after 1135.

David's successor King Malcolm IV (r.1153–1165) reportedly stayed at Edinburgh more than at any other location. But in 1174, King William "the Lion" (r.1165–1214) was captured by the English at the Battle of Alnwick. He was forced to sign the Treaty of Falaise to secure his release, in return for surrendering Edinburgh Castle, along with the castles of Berwick, Roxburgh and Stirling, to the English King, Henry II. The castle was occupied by the English for twelve years, until 1186, when it was returned to William as the dowry of his English bride, Ermengarde de Beaumont, who had been chosen for him by King Henry. By the end of the 12th century, Edinburgh Castle was established as the main repository of Scotland's official state papers.

=== Wars of Scottish Independence ===
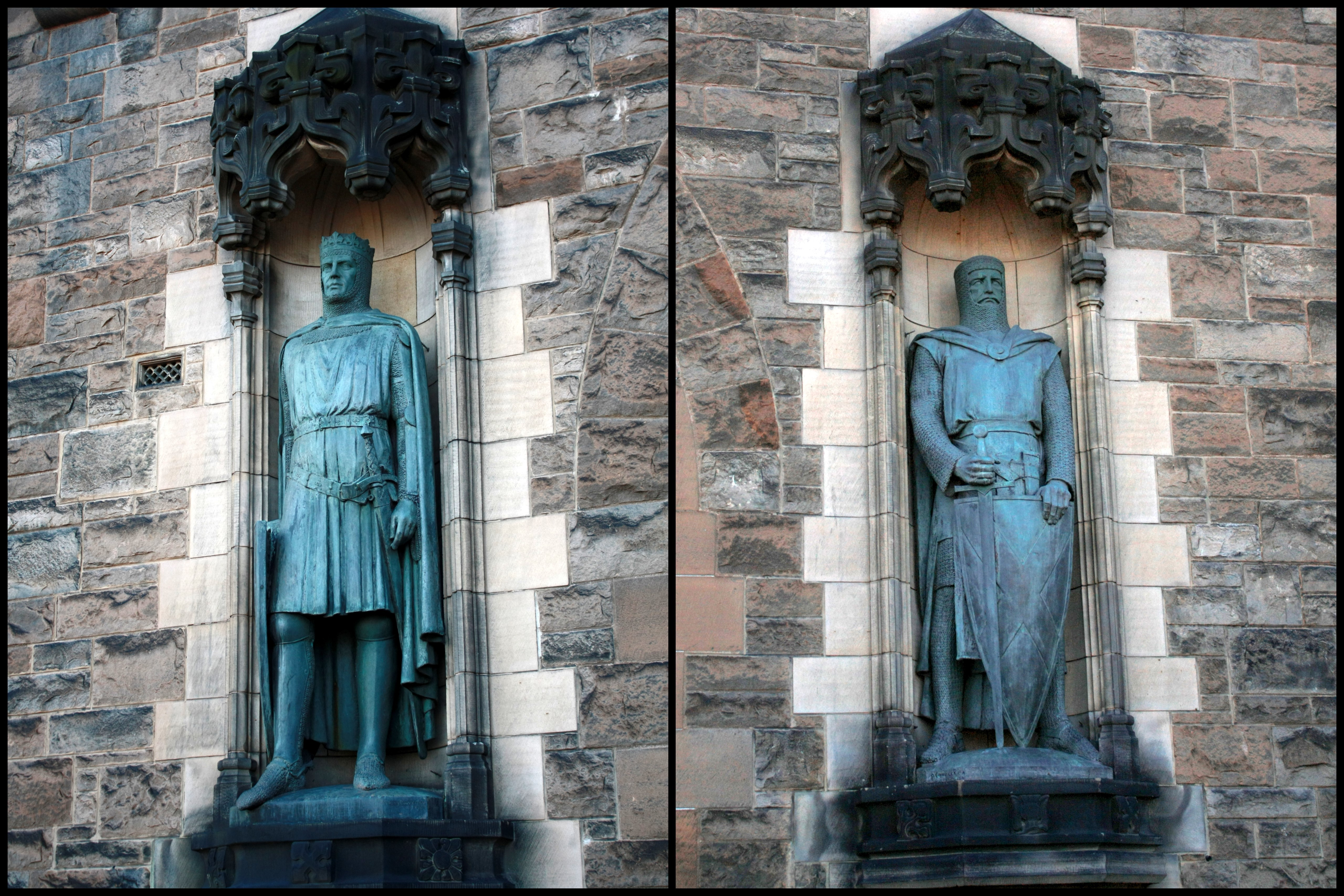
Statues of Robert the Bruce (left) by Thomas Clapperton and William Wallace by Alexander Carrick were added to the Gatehouse entrance in 1929.

A century later, in 1286, on the death of King Alexander III, the throne of Scotland became vacant. Edward I of England was appointed to adjudicate the competing claims for the Scottish crown, but used the opportunity to attempt to establish himself as the feudal overlord of Scotland. During the negotiations, Edward stayed briefly at Edinburgh Castle and may have received homage there from the Scottish nobles.

In March 1296, Edward I invaded Scotland, unleashing the First War of Scottish Independence. Edinburgh Castle soon came under English control, surrendering after a three-day-long bombardment. Following the siege, Edward had many Scottish legal records and royal treasures moved from the castle to England. A large garrison numbering 325 men was installed in 1300. Edward also brought to Scotland his master builders of the Welsh castles, including Thomas de Houghton and Master Walter of Hereford, both of whom travelled from Wales to Edinburgh. After the death of Edward I in 1307, however, England's control over Scotland weakened. On 14 March 1314, a surprise night attack by Thomas Randolph, 1st Earl of Moray recaptured the castle. John Barbour's narrative poem The Brus relates how a party of thirty hand-picked men was guided by one William Francis, a member of the garrison who knew of a route along the north face of the Castle Rock and a place where the wall might be scaled. Making the difficult ascent, Randolph's men scaled the wall, surprised the garrison and took control. Robert the Bruce immediately ordered the slighting of the castle to prevent its re-occupation by the English. Four months later, his army secured victory at the Battle of Bannockburn.

After Bruce's death in 1329, Edward III of England determined to renew the attempted subjugation of Scotland and supported the claim of Edward Balliol, son of the former King John Balliol, over that of Bruce's young son David II. Edward invaded in 1333, marking the start of the Second War of Scottish Independence, and the English forces reoccupied and refortified Edinburgh Castle in 1335, holding it until 1341. This time, the Scottish assault was led by William Douglas, Lord of Liddesdale. Douglas's party disguised themselves as merchants from Leith bringing supplies to the garrison. Driving a cart into the entrance, they halted it there to prevent the gates from closing. A larger force hidden nearby rushed to join them and the castle was retaken. The 100 English men of the garrison were all killed.

=== David's Tower and the 15th century ===
The 1357 Treaty of Berwick brought the Wars of Independence to a close. David II resumed his rule and set about rebuilding Edinburgh Castle which became his principal seat of government. David's Tower was begun around 1367, and was incomplete when David died at the castle in 1371. It was completed by his successor, Robert II, in the 1370s. The tower stood on the site of the present Half Moon Battery connected by a section of curtain wall to the smaller Constable's Tower, a round tower built between 1375 and 1379 where the Portcullis Gate now stands.

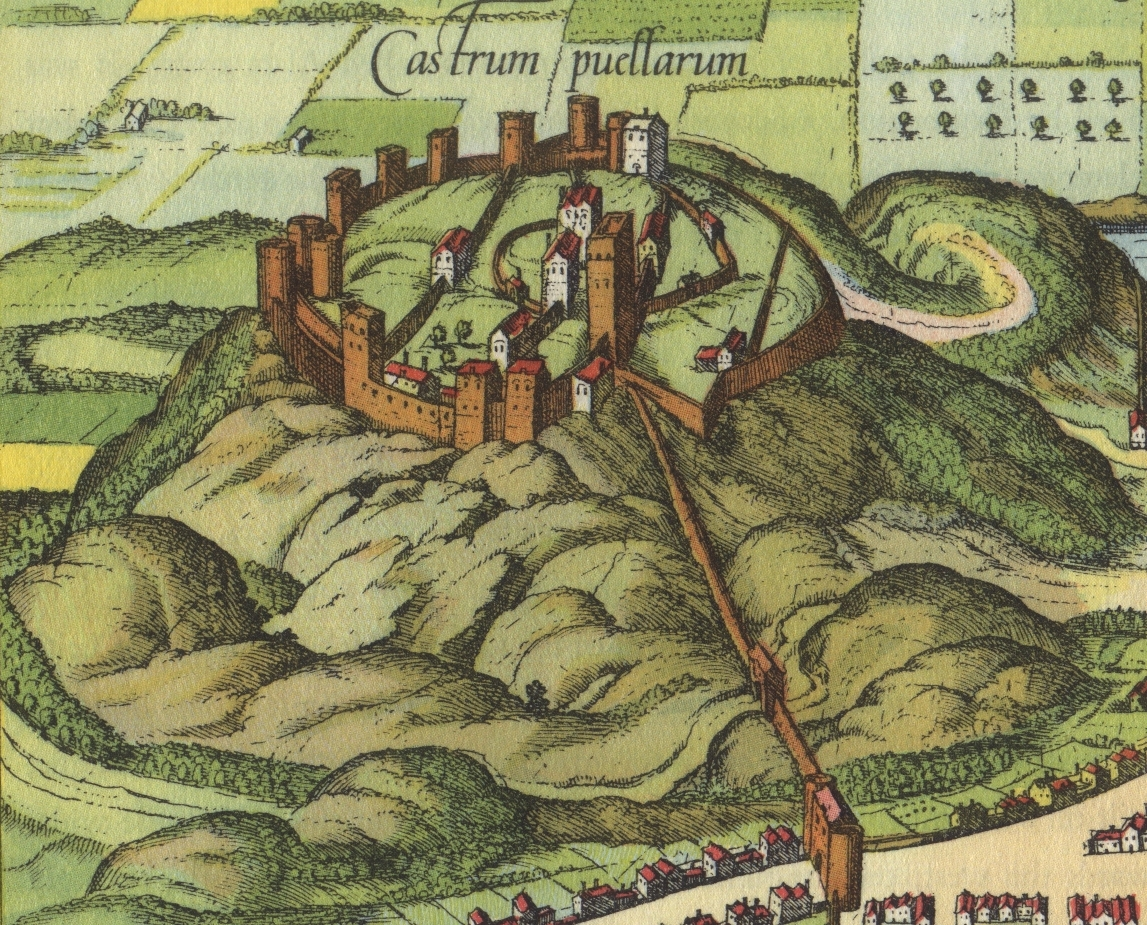
A late-16th-century depiction of the castle, from Braun & Hogenberg's Civitates orbis terrarum, showing David's Tower at the centre

In the early 15th century, another English invasion, this time under Henry IV, reached Edinburgh Castle and began a siege, but eventually withdrew due to lack of supplies. At least by 1436–1437, Sir William Crichton was Keeper or Governor of Edinburgh Castle, and soon after became Chancellor of Scotland. In an attempt to gain the regency of Scotland, Crichton sought to break the power of the Douglases, the principal noble family in the kingdom. The 16-year-old William Douglas, 6th Earl of Douglas, and his younger brother David were summoned to Edinburgh Castle in November 1440. After the so-called "Black Dinner" had taken place in David's Tower, both boys were summarily executed on trumped-up charges in the presence of the 10-year-old King James II (r.1437–1460). Douglas' supporters subsequently besieged the castle, inflicting damage. Construction continued throughout this period, with the area now known as Crown Square being laid out over vaults in the 1430s. Royal apartments were built, forming the nucleus of the later palace block, and a Great Hall was in existence by 1458. In 1464, access to the castle was improved when the current approach road up the north-east side of the rock was created to allow easier movement of the royal artillery train in and out of the area now known as the Upper Ward.

In 1479, Alexander Stewart, Duke of Albany, was imprisoned in David's Tower for plotting against his brother, King James III (r.1460–1488). He escaped by getting his guards drunk, and then lowering himself from a window on a rope. The duke fled to France, then England, where he allied himself with King Edward IV. In 1482, Albany marched into Scotland with Richard, Duke of Gloucester (later King Richard III), and an English army. James III was trapped in the castle from 22 July to 29 September 1482 until he successfully negotiated a settlement.

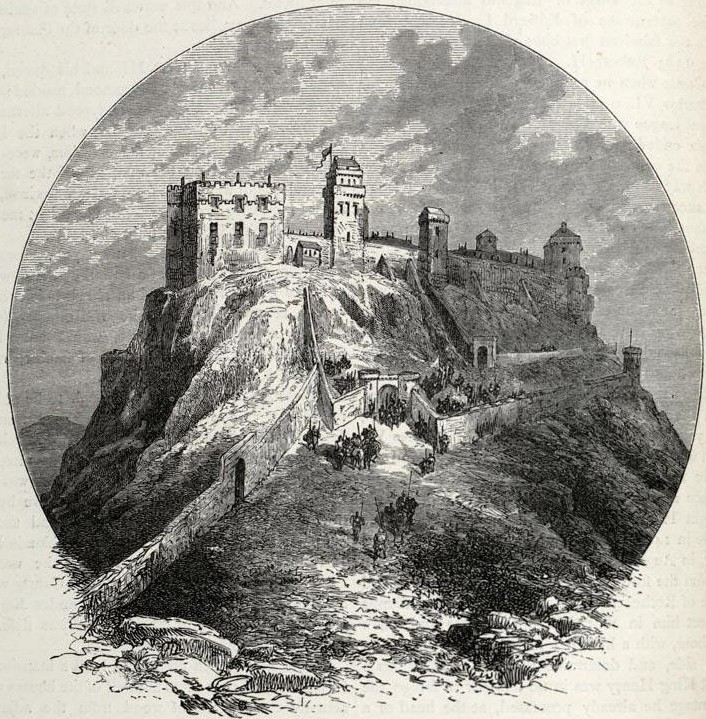
Edinburgh Castle as it may have looked before the Lang Siege of 1571–1573, with David's Tower and the Palace block, centre and left

During the 15th century, the castle was increasingly used as an arsenal and armaments factory. The first known purchase of a gun was in 1384, and the "great bombard" Mons Meg was delivered to Edinburgh in 1457. The first recorded mention of an armoury for the manufacture of guns occurs in 1474, and by 1498 the master gunner Robert Borthwick was casting bronze guns at Edinburgh. By 1511 Edinburgh was the principal foundry in Scotland, supplanting Stirling Castle, with Scottish and European smiths working under Borthwick, who by 1512 was appointed "master melter of the king's guns". Their output included guns for the Scottish flagship, the "Great Michael", and the "Seven Sisters", a set of cannons captured by the English at Flodden in 1513. Sir Thomas Howard, England's Lord Admiral, admired their graceful shape and brilliant finish, declaring them the most beautiful [cannon] for their size and length that he had ever seen. From 1510 Dutch craftsmen were also producing hand culverins, an early firearm. After Flodden, Borthwick continued his work, producing an unknown number of guns, but none have survived. He was succeeded by French smiths, who began manufacturing hagbuts (another type of firearm) in the 1550s, and by 1541 the castle had a stock of 413.

Meanwhile, the royal family began to stay more frequently at the Abbey of Holyrood, about 1 mile (1.6 km) from the castle. Around the end of the fifteenth century, King James IV (r.1488–1513) built the Palace of Holyroodhouse, by the abbey, as his principal Edinburgh residence and the castle's role as a royal home subsequently declined. James IV did, however, construct the Great Hall, which was completed in the early 16th century, and the castle featured in his tournaments of the Wild Knight and the Black Lady. His daughter Margaret Stewart was lodged in the castle with her servant Ellen More.

=== 16th century and the Lang Siege ===
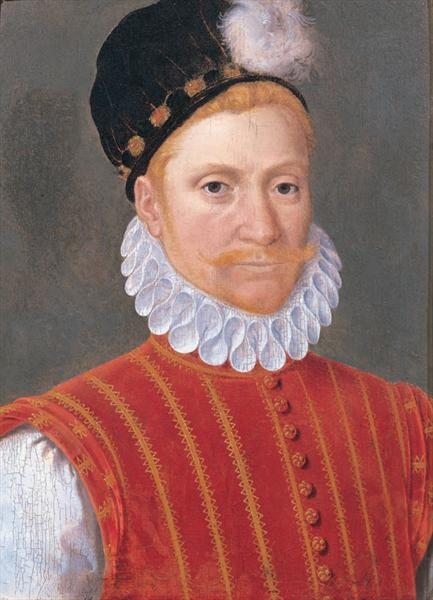
Sir William Kirkcaldy of Grange, who held the castle on behalf of Queen Mary during the Lang Siege of 1571–73. Painting by Jean Clouet

James IV was killed in battle at Flodden Field, on 9 September 1513. Expecting the English to press their advantage, the Scots hastily constructed a town wall around Edinburgh and augmented the castle's defences. Robert Borthwick and a Frenchman, Antoine d'Arces, were involved in designing new artillery defences and fortifications in 1514, though it appears from lack of evidence that little of the planned work was carried out. Three years later, King James V (r.1513–1542), still only five years old, was brought to the castle for safety. Upon his death 25 years later, the crown passed to his week-old daughter, Mary, Queen of Scots. English invasions followed, as King Henry VIII attempted to force a dynastic marriage on Scotland. When the English burnt Edinburgh in May 1544 the gunner Andrew Mansioun firing from the castle destroyed an English cannon placed to bombard the forework. In 1547 disaffected members of the garrison who resented Regent Arran came to Norham Castle and offered to let the English in.

Refortification in 1548 included an earthen angle-bastion, known as the Spur, of the type known as trace italienne, one of the earliest examples in Britain. Brunstane Castle the home of the traitor Alexander Crichton was demolished to provide building materials. The Spur may have been designed by Migliorino Ubaldini, an Italian engineer from the court of Henry II of France, and was said to have the arms of France carved on it. James V's widow, Mary of Guise, acted as regent from 1554 until her death at the castle in 1560.

The following year, the Catholic Mary, Queen of Scots, returned from France to begin her reign, which was marred by crises and quarrels among the powerful Protestant Scottish nobility. In 1565, the Queen made an unpopular marriage with Henry Stuart, Lord Darnley. On 19 June 1566 in a small room of the Palace at Edinburgh Castle, she gave birth to their son James, who would later be King of both Scotland and England. Mary made plans to repair the castle and make it somewhat fairer than it had been. Mary's reign was, however, brought to an abrupt end. Three months after the murder of Darnley at Kirk o' Field in 1567, she married James Hepburn, 4th Earl of Bothwell, one of the chief murder suspects. A large proportion of the nobility rebelled, resulting ultimately in the imprisonment and forced abdication of Mary at Lochleven Castle. She escaped and fled to England, but some of the nobility remained faithful to her cause. Edinburgh Castle was initially handed by its captain, James Balfour, to the Regent Moray, who had forced Mary's abdication and now held power in the name of the infant King James VI. Shortly after the Battle of Langside, in May 1568, Moray appointed Sir William Kirkcaldy of Grange Keeper of the Castle.

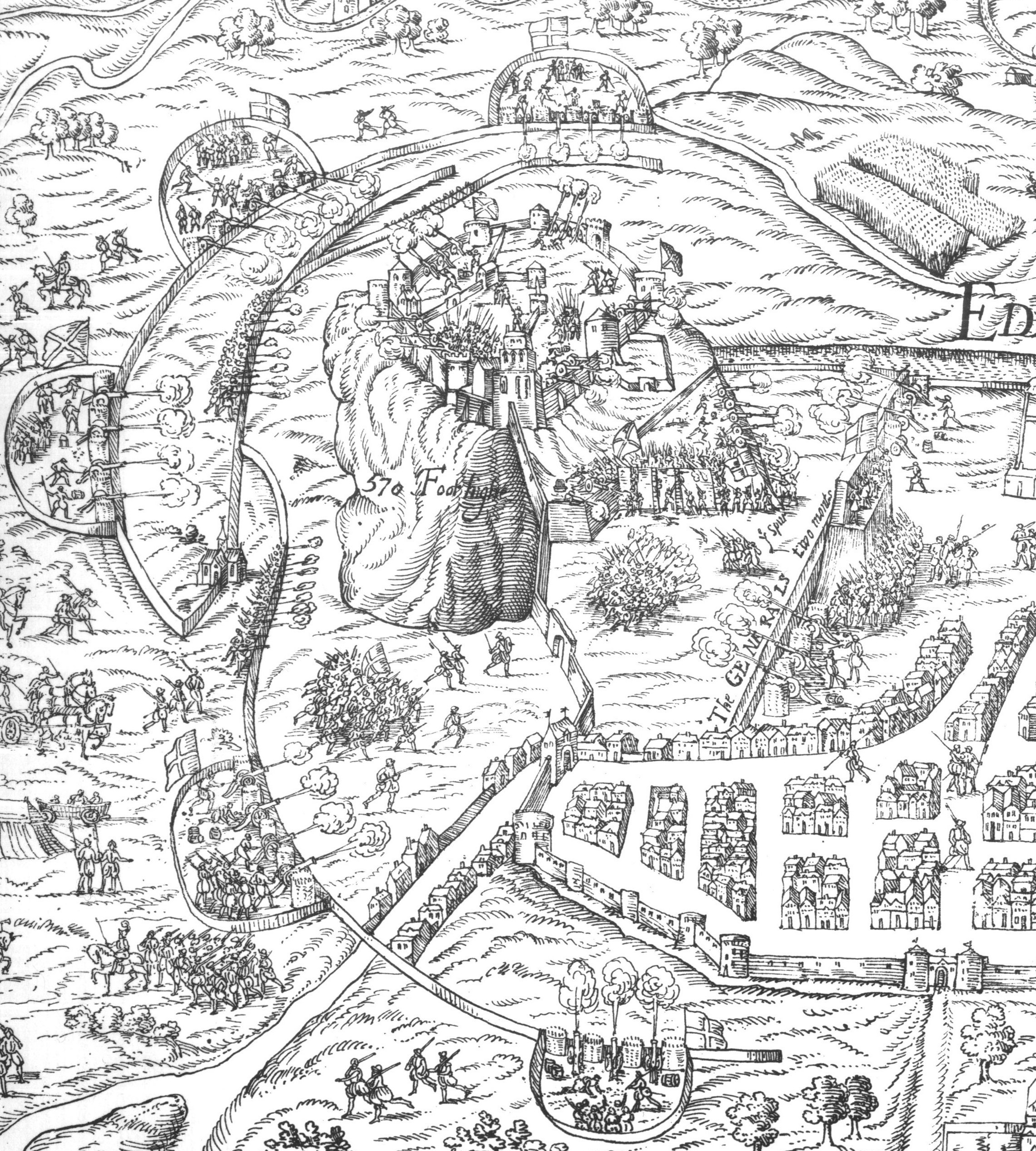
Detail from a contemporary drawing of Edinburgh Castle under siege in 1573, showing it surrounded by attacking batteries

Grange was a trusted lieutenant of the Regent, but after Moray's murder in January 1570 his allegiance to the King's cause began to waver. Intermittent civil war continued between the supporters of the two monarchs, and in April 1571 Dumbarton Castle fell to "the King's men". Under the influence of William Maitland of Lethington, Mary's secretary, Grange changed sides, occupying the town and castle of Edinburgh for Queen Mary, and against the new regent, the Earl of Lennox. The stand-off which followed was not resolved until two years later, and became known as the "Lang Siege", from the Scots word for "long". Hostilities began in May, with a month-long siege of the town, and a second short siege in October. Blockades and skirmishing continued meanwhile, and Grange continued to refortify the castle. The King's party appealed to Elizabeth I of England for assistance, as they lacked the artillery and money required to reduce the castle, and feared that Grange would receive aid from France and the Duke of Alba in the Spanish Netherlands. Elizabeth sent ambassadors to negotiate, and in July 1572 a truce was agreed and the blockade lifted. The town was effectively surrendered to the King's party, with Grange confined to the castle.

The truce expired on 1 January 1573, and Grange began bombarding the town. His supplies of powder and shot, however, were running low, and despite having 40 cannons available, there were only seven gunners in the garrison. The King's forces, now with the Earl of Morton in charge as regent, were making headway with plans for a siege. Trenches were dug to surround the castle, and St Margaret's Well was poisoned. By February, all Queen Mary's other supporters had surrendered to the Regent, but Grange resolved to resist despite water shortages within the castle. The garrison continued to bombard the town, killing a number of citizens. They also made sorties to set fires, burning 100 houses in the town and then firing on anyone attempting to put out the flames.

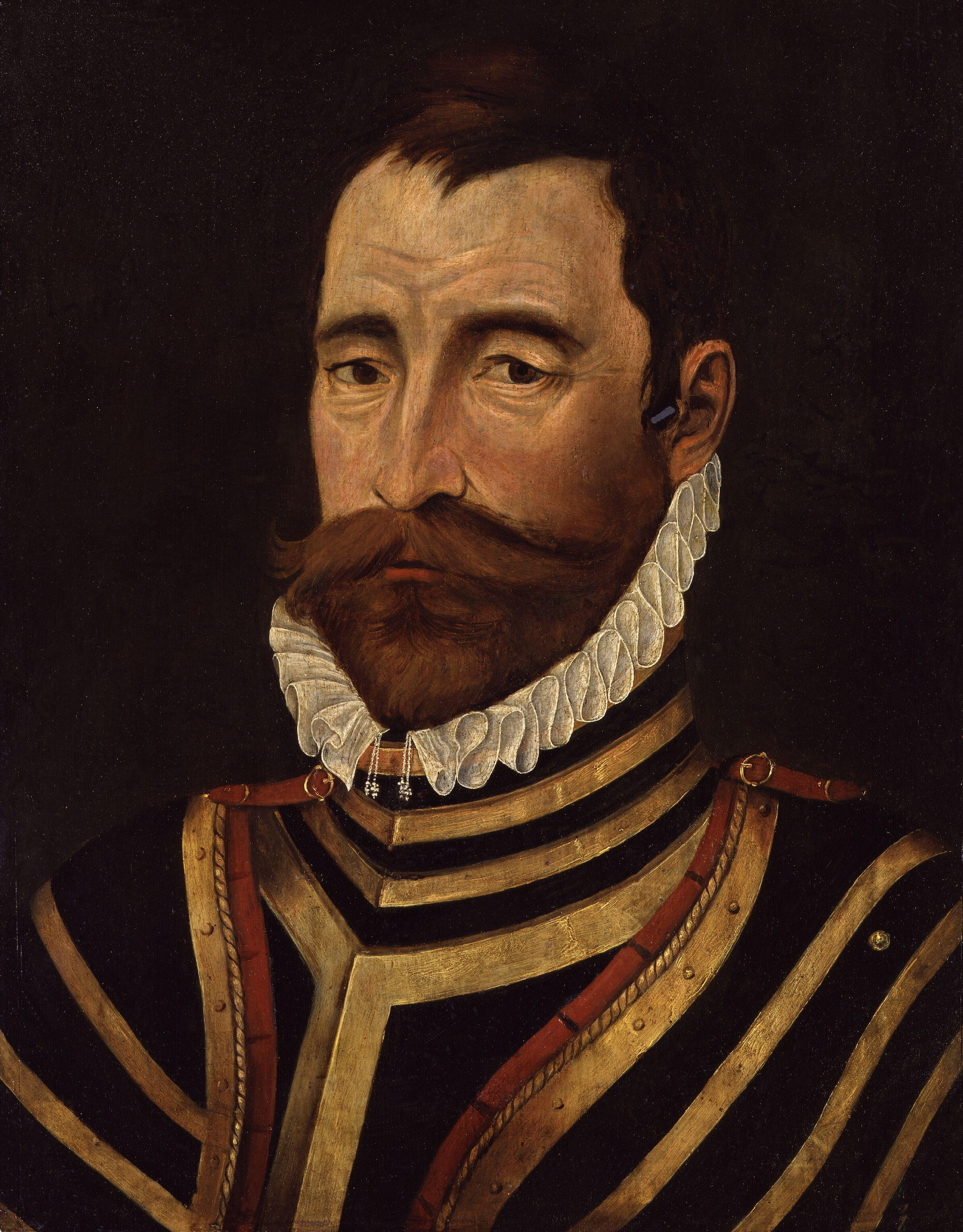
Sir William Drury, commander of Elizabeth I of England's Protestant troops who brought the Lang Siege to an end in 1573. Unknown artist

In April, a force of around 1,000 English troops, led by Sir William Drury, arrived in Edinburgh. They were followed by 27 cannons from Berwick-upon-Tweed, including one that had been cast within Edinburgh Castle and captured by the English at Flodden. The English troops built an artillery emplacement on Castle Hill, immediately facing the east walls of the castle, and five others to the north, west and south. By 17 May these batteries were ready, and the bombardment began. Over the next 12 days, the gunners dispatched around 3,000 shots at the castle. On 22 May, the south wall of David's Tower collapsed, and the next day the Constable's Tower also fell. The debris blocked the castle entrance, as well as the Fore Well, although this had already run dry. On 26 May, the English attacked and captured the Spur, the outer fortification of the castle, which had been isolated by the collapse. The following day Grange emerged from the castle by a ladder after calling for a ceasefire to allow negotiations for a surrender to take place. When it was made clear that he would not be allowed to go free even if he ended the siege, Grange resolved to continue the resistance, but the garrison threatened to mutiny. He therefore arranged for Drury and his men to enter the castle on 28 May, preferring to surrender to the English rather than the Regent Morton. Edinburgh Castle was handed over to George Douglas of Parkhead, the Regent's brother, and the garrison was allowed to go free. In contrast, Kirkcaldy of Grange, his brother James and two jewellers, James Mossman and James Cokke, who had been minting coins in Mary's name inside the castle, were hanged at the Cross in Edinburgh on 3 August.

=== Nova Scotia and Civil War ===
Much of the castle was subsequently rebuilt by Regent Morton, including the Spur, the new Half Moon Battery and the Portcullis Gate. Some of these works were supervised by William MacDowall, the master of work who fifteen years earlier had repaired David's Tower. The Half Moon Battery, while impressive in size, is considered by historians to have been an ineffective and outdated artillery fortification. This may have been due to a shortage of resources, although the battery's position obscuring the ancient David's Tower and enhancing the prominence of the palace block, has been seen as a significant decision.

The battered palace block remained unused, particularly after James VI departed to become King of England in 1603. James had repairs carried out in 1584, and in 1615–1616 more extensive repairs were carried out in preparation for his return visit to Scotland. The mason William Wallace and master of works James Murray introduced an early Scottish example of the double-pile block. The principal external features were the three, three-storey oriel windows on the east façade, facing the town and emphasising that this was a palace rather than just a place of defence. During his visit in 1617, James held court in the refurbished palace block, but still preferred to sleep at Holyrood.

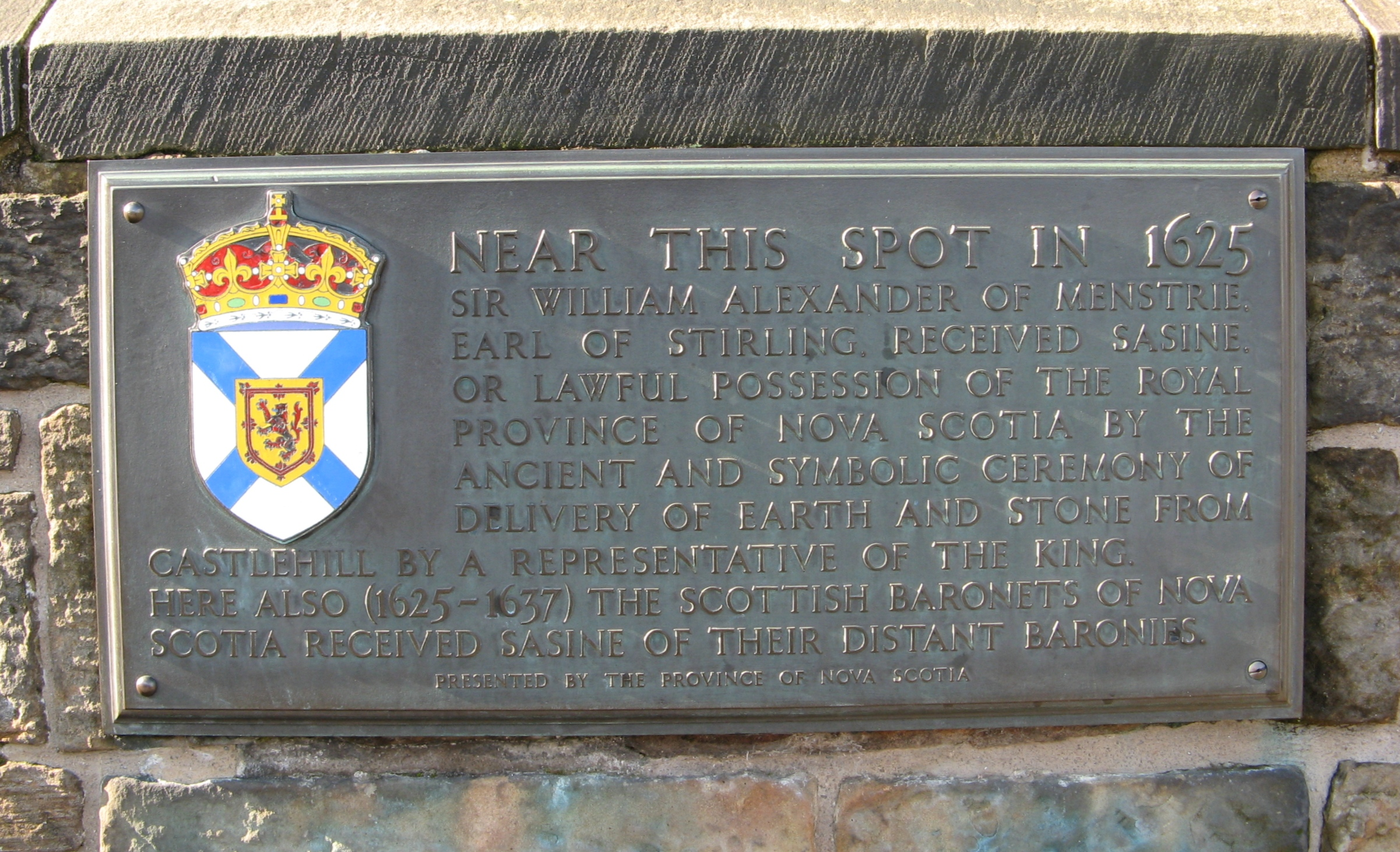
Memorial plaque to Sir William Alexander, on the Castle Esplanade

In 1621, King James granted Sir William Alexander the land in North America between New England and Newfoundland, as Nova Scotia ("New Scotland"). To promote the settlement and plantation of the new territory, the Baronetage of Nova Scotia was created in 1624. Under Scots law, baronets had to "take sasine" by symbolically receiving the earth and stone of the land of which they were baronet. To make this possible, since Nova Scotia was so distant, the King declared that sasine could be taken either in the new province or alternatively "at the castle of Edinburgh as the most eminent and principal place of Scotland."

James' successor, King Charles I, visited Edinburgh Castle only once, hosting a feast in the Great Hall and staying the night before his Scottish coronation in 1633. This was the last occasion that a reigning monarch resided in the castle. In 1639, in response to Charles' attempts to impose Episcopacy on the Scottish Church, civil war broke out between the King's forces and the Presbyterian Covenanters. The Covenanters, led by Alexander Leslie, captured Edinburgh Castle after a short siege, although it was restored to Charles after the Peace of Berwick in June the same year. The peace was short-lived, however, and the following year the Covenanters took the castle again, this time after a three-month siege, during which the garrison ran out of supplies. The Spur was badly damaged and was demolished in the 1640s. The Royalist commander James Graham, 1st Marquis of Montrose, was imprisoned here after his capture in 1650.

In May 1650, the Covenanters signed the Treaty of Breda, allying themselves with the exiled Charles II against the English Parliamentarians, who had executed his father the previous year. In response to the Scots proclaiming Charles King, Oliver Cromwell launched an invasion of Scotland, defeating the Covenanter army at Dunbar in September. Edinburgh Castle was taken after a three-month siege, which caused further damage. The governor of the castle, Colonel Walter Dundas, surrendered to Cromwell despite having enough supplies to hold out, allegedly from a desire to change sides.

=== Garrison fortress: Jacobites and prisoners of war ===
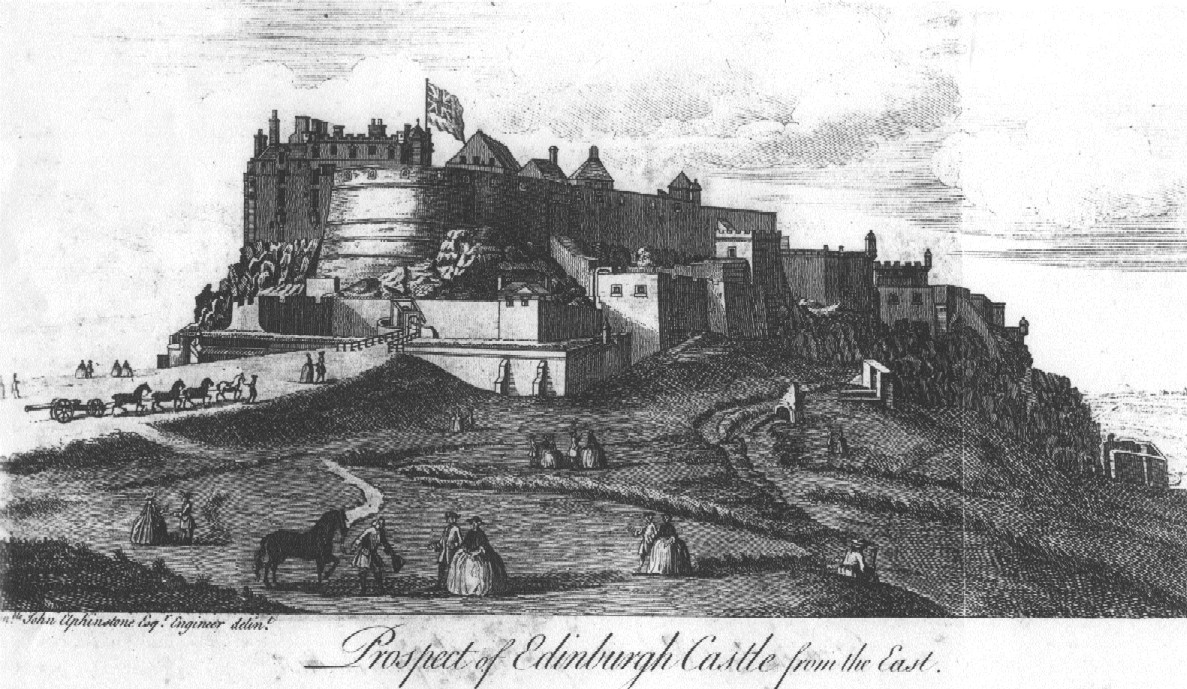
An engraving of Edinburgh Castle made shortly before the creation of the Esplanade was begun in 1753

After his Restoration in 1660, Charles II opted to maintain a full-time standing army based on Cromwell's New Model Army. From this time until 1923, a garrison was continuously maintained at the castle. The medieval royal castle was transformed into a garrison fortress, but continued to see military and political action. The Marquis of Argyll was imprisoned here in 1661, when King Charles II settled old scores with his enemies following his return to the throne. Twenty years later, Argyll's son, the 9th Earl of Argyll, was also imprisoned in the castle for religious Nonconformism in the reign of King James VII. He escaped by disguising himself as his sister's footman, but was recaptured and returned to the castle after his failed rebellion to oust James from the throne in 1685.

James VII was deposed and exiled by the Glorious Revolution of 1688, which installed William of Orange as King of England. Not long after, in early 1689, the Estates of Scotland, after convening to accept William formally as their new king, demanded that Duke of Gordon, governor of the castle, surrender the fortress. Gordon, who had been appointed by James VII as a fellow Catholic, refused. In March 1689, the castle was blockaded by 7,000 troops against a garrison of 160 men, further weakened by religious disputes. On 18 March, Viscount Dundee, intent on raising a rebellion in the Highlands, climbed up the western side of the Castle Rock to urge Gordon to hold the castle against the new King. Gordon agreed. During the ensuing siege the defenders, at times, conducted a spirited defence: a report in April noted that "Mackay’s men [the besiegers], and the Castle, fire fiercely one at the other". At some other times, however, especially in the latter stages of the siege, Gordon refused to fire upon the town. The besiegers inflicted little damage on the castle. Despite Dundee's initial successes in the north, Gordon eventually surrendered on 14 June, due to dwindling supplies and having lost 70 men during the three-month siege.

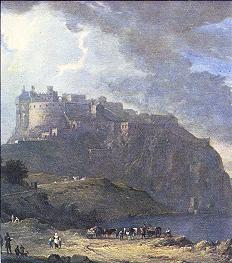
Edinburgh Castle with the Nor Loch in foreground, around 1780, by Alexander Nasmyth

The castle was almost taken in the first Jacobite rising in support of James Stuart, the "Old Pretender", in 1715. On 8 September, just two days after the rising began, a party of around 100 Jacobite Highlanders, led by Lord Drummond, attempted to scale the walls with the assistance of members of the garrison. However, the rope ladder lowered by the castle sentries was too short, and the alarm was raised after a change of the watch. The Jacobites fled, while the deserters within the castle were hanged or flogged. In 1728, General Wade reported that the castle's defences were decayed and inadequate, and a major strengthening of the fortifications was carried out throughout the 1720s and 1730s. This was the period when most of the artillery defences and bastions on the north and west sides of the castle were built. These were designed by military engineer Captain John Romer, and built by the architect William Adam. They include the Argyle Battery, Mills Mount Battery, the Low Defences and the Western Defences.

The last military action at the castle took place during the second Jacobite rising of 1745. The Jacobite army, under Charles Edward Stuart ("Bonnie Prince Charlie"), captured Edinburgh without a fight in September 1745, but the castle remained in the hands of its ageing Deputy Governor, General George Preston, who refused to surrender. After their victory over the government army at Prestonpans on 21 September, the Jacobites attempted to blockade the castle. Preston's response was to bombard Jacobite positions within the town. After several buildings had been demolished and four people killed, Charles called off the blockade. The Jacobites themselves had no heavy guns with which to respond, and by November they had marched into England, leaving Edinburgh to the castle garrison.

Over the next century, the castle vaults were used to hold prisoners of war during several conflicts, including the Seven Years' War (1756–1763), the American War of Independence (1775–1783) and the Napoleonic Wars (1803–1815). During this time, several new buildings were erected within the castle, including powder magazines, stores, the Governor's House (1742), and the New Barracks (1796–1799).

=== 19th century to the present ===
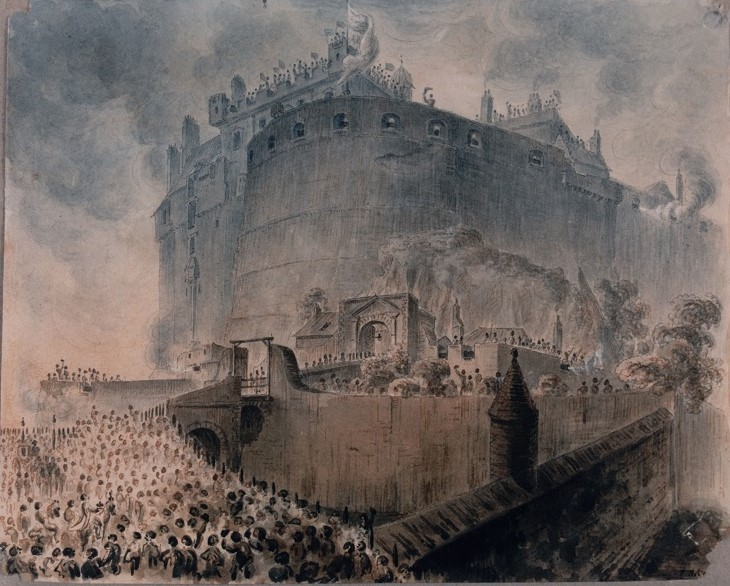
King George IV waves from the battlements of the Half Moon Battery in 1822, drawn by James Skene.

A mass prison break in 1811, in which 49 prisoners of war escaped via a hole in the south wall, persuaded the authorities that the castle vaults were no longer suitable as a prison. This use ceased in 1814 and the castle began gradually to assume a different role as a national monument. In 1818, Sir Walter Scott was given permission to search the castle for the Crown of Scotland, believed lost after the union of Scotland and England in 1707. Breaking into a sealed room, now known as the Crown Room, and unlocking a chest within, he rediscovered the Honours of Scotland, which were then put on public display with an entry charge of one shilling. In 1822, King George IV made a visit to Edinburgh, becoming the first reigning monarch to visit the castle since Charles II in 1651. In 1829, the cannon Mons Meg was returned from the Tower of London, where it had been taken as part of the process of disarming Scotland after "the '45", and the palace began to be opened up to visitors during the 1830s. St Margaret's Chapel was "rediscovered" in 1845, having been used as a store for many years.

Whilst in Germany during 1855, Richard Clement Moody of the Royal Engineers, who was later the founder of British Columbia, composed plans for the restoration of Edinburgh Castle in which measurements were made 'drawn to musical chords'. He has been described as 'a visionary in a plain land' and 'a man who could conceive of Edinburgh Castle in terms of a musical score'. His plans so impressed Lord Panmure that he was invited to Windsor Castle to present them to Queen Victoria and Prince Albert, both of whom were musicians and both of whom were delighted. The construction of Moody's plans was impeded by the retirement of Lord Panmure, but they are retained at the War Office, where 'they still remain a memorial to Moody's talent'.

Works in the 1880s, which were funded by the Edinburgh publisher William Nelson and carried out by Hippolyte Blanc, saw the Argyle Tower built over the Portcullis Gate and the Great Hall restored after years of use as a barracks. A new Gatehouse was built in 1888. During the 19th century, several schemes were put forward for rebuilding the whole castle as a Scottish baronial style château. Work began in 1858, but was soon abandoned, and only the hospital building was eventually remodelled in 1897. Following the death of Prince Albert in 1861, the architect David Bryce put forward a proposal for a 50-metre (160 ft) keep as a memorial, but Queen Victoria objected and the scheme was not pursued.

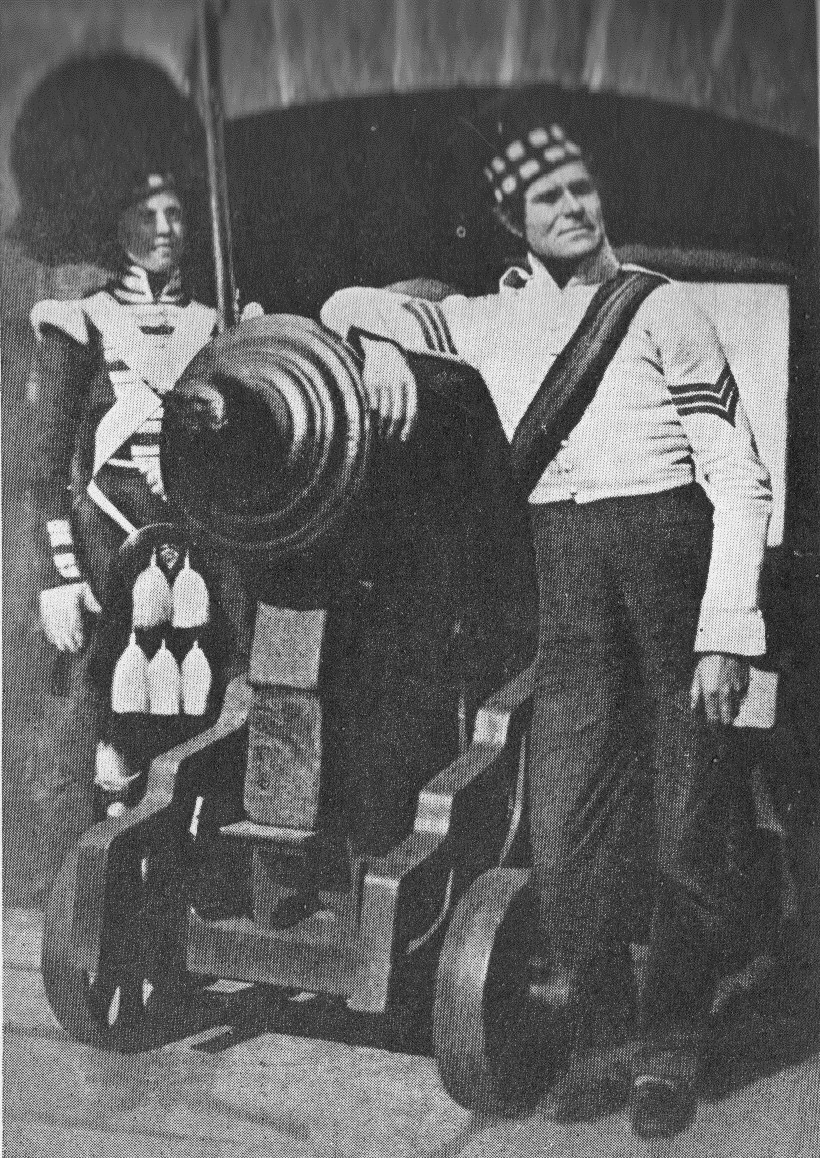
Soldiers of the 92nd Regiment of Foot (later Gordon Highlanders) while on garrison duty at the castle in 1845

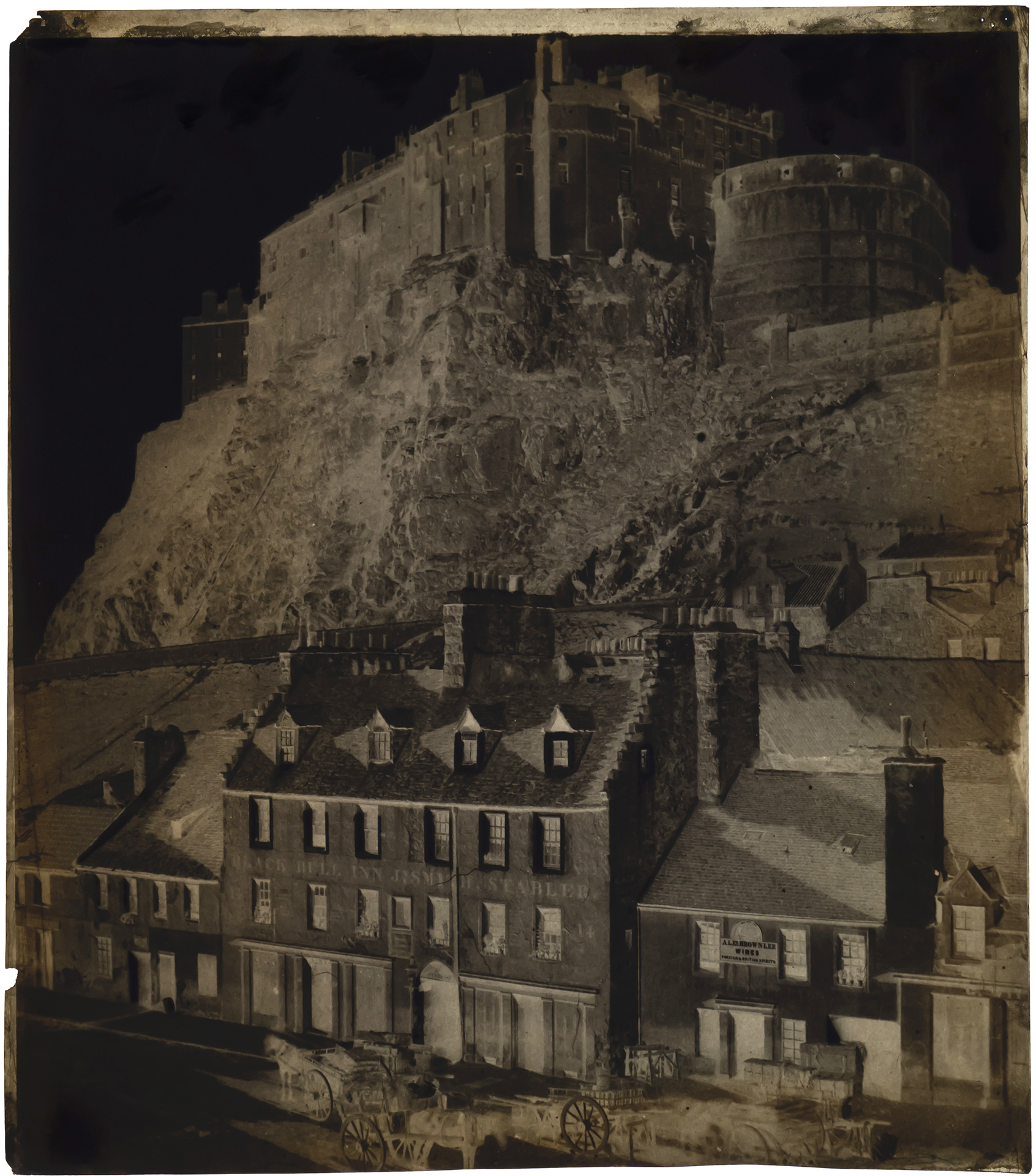
Edinburgh Castle, waxed-paper negative by Thomas Keith, c. 1855. Department of Image Collections, National Gallery of Art Library, Washington DC

In 1905, responsibility for the castle was transferred from the War Office to the Office of Works, although the garrison remained until 1923, when the troops moved to Redford Barracks in south-west Edinburgh. The castle was again used as a prison during the First World War, when "Red Clydesider" David Kirkwood was confined in the military prison block, and during the Second World War, when downed German Luftwaffe pilots were captured. The position of Governor of Edinburgh Castle, vacant since 1876, was revived in 1935 as an honorary title for the general officer commanding in Scotland, the first holder being Lieutenant-general Sir Archibald Cameron of Lochiel. The castle passed into the care of Historic Scotland when it was established in 1991, and was designated a Scheduled Ancient Monument in 1993. The buildings and structures of the castle are further protected by 24 separate listings, including 13 at category A, the highest level of protection for a historic building in Scotland, and special care was taken when installing 31 kW solar panels on the roof of the War Memorial, obscured by its parapet. The Old and New Towns of Edinburgh, a World Heritage Site inscribed by UNESCO in 1995, is described as "dominated by a medieval fortress".

== Description ==
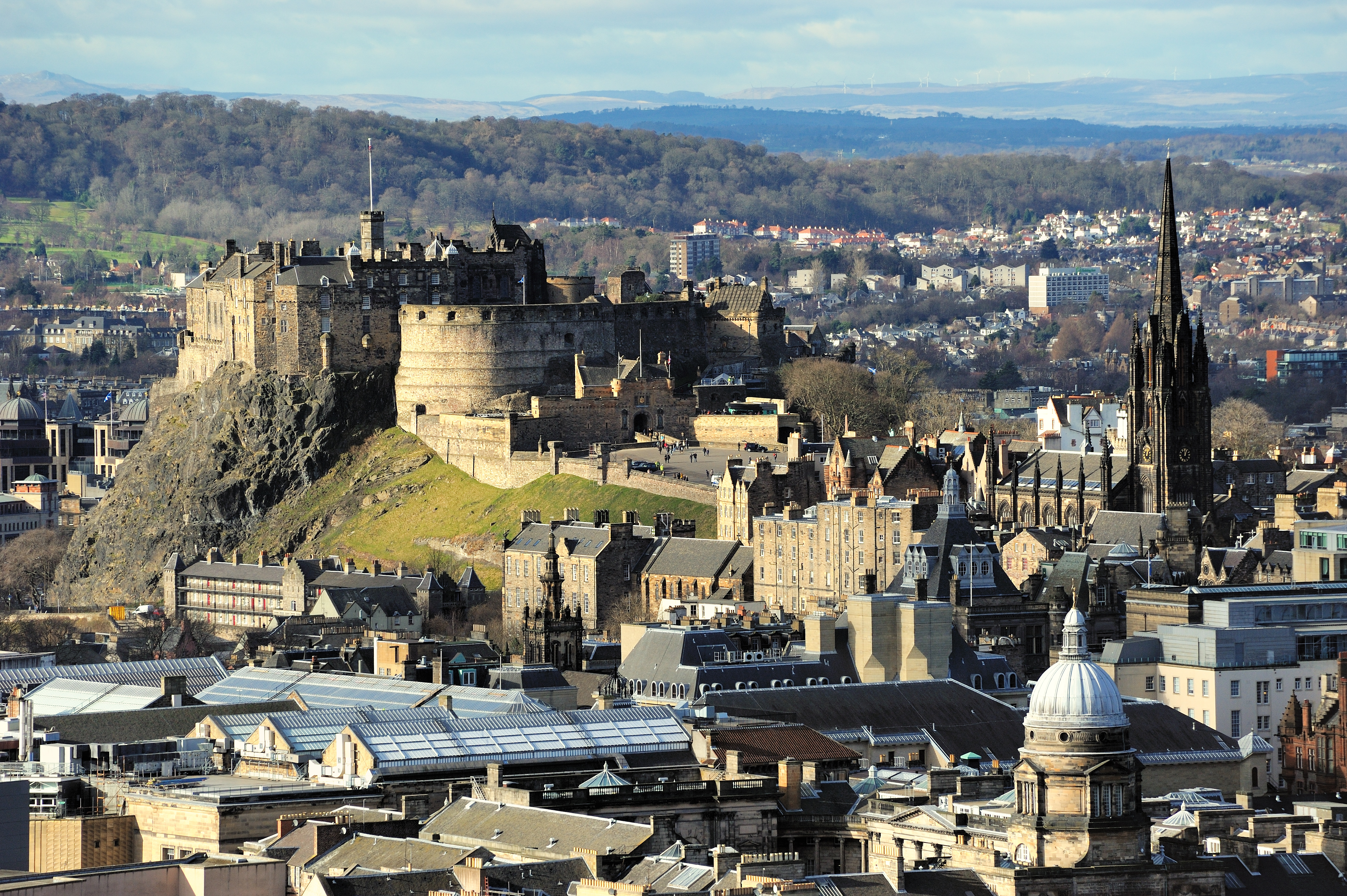
The Castle dominates the city skyline.

Edinburgh Castle is located at the top of the Royal Mile, at the west end of Edinburgh's Old Town. The volcanic Castle Rock offers a naturally defended position, with sheer cliffs to north and south, and a steep ascent from the west. The only easy approach is from the town to the east, and the castle's defences are situated accordingly, with a series of gates protecting the route to the summit of the Castle Rock.

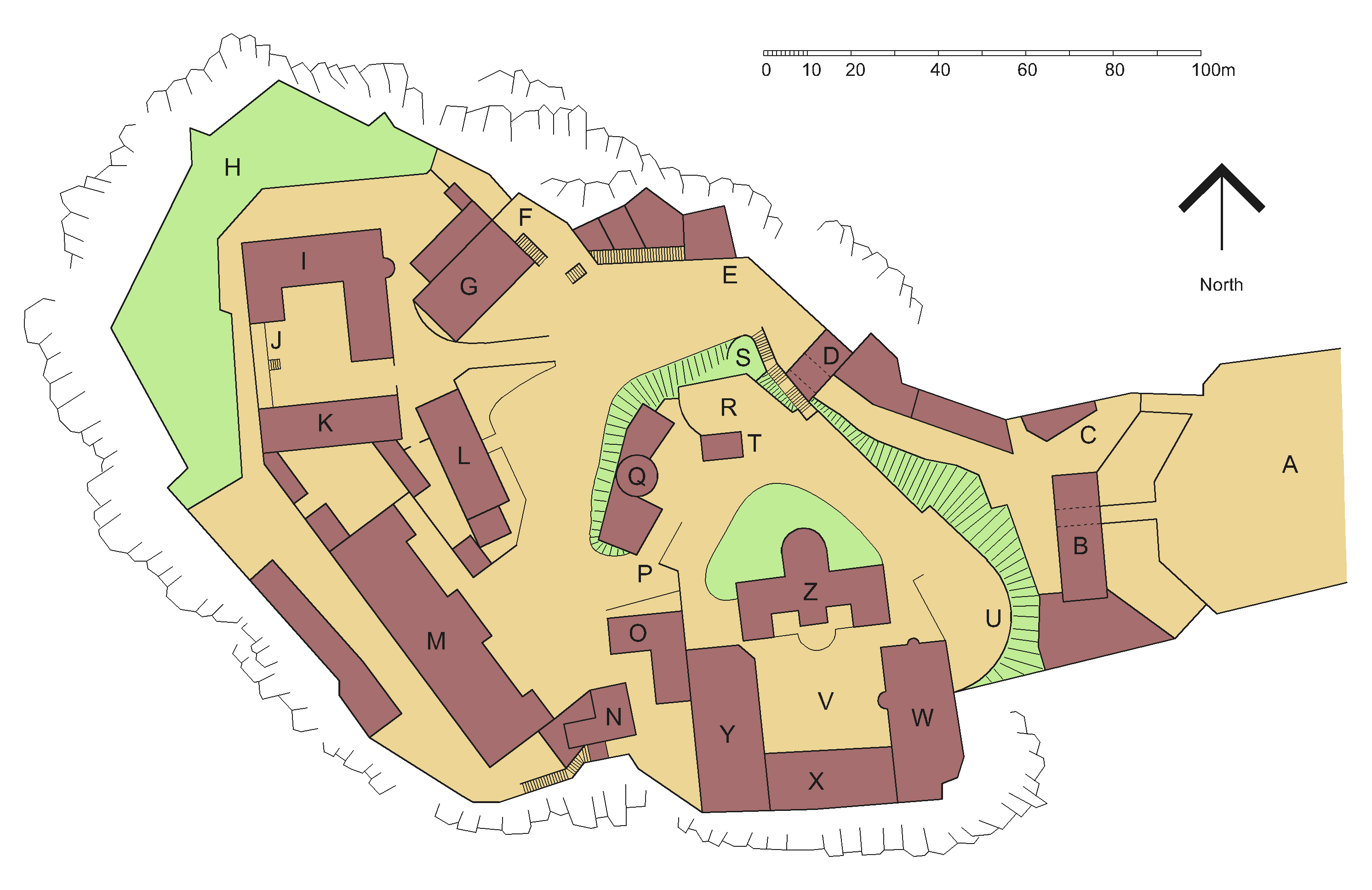
Plan of Edinburgh Castle Key: A Esplanade · B Gatehouse · C Ticket office · D Portcullis Gate & Argyle Tower · E Argyle Battery · F Mills Mount Battery & One o'Clock Gun · G Cartsheds · H Western Defences · I Hospital · J Butts Battery · K Scottish National War Museum · L Governors House · M New Barracks · N Military Prison · O Royal Scots Museum · P Foog's Gate · Q Reservoirs · R Mons Meg · S Pet Cemetery · T St. Margaret's Chapel · U Half Moon Battery · V Crown Square · W Royal Palace · X Great Hall · Y Queen Anne Building · Z Scottish National War Memorial

=== Outer defences ===
In front of the castle is a long sloping forecourt known as the Esplanade. Originally the Spur, a 16th-century hornwork, was located here. The present Esplanade was laid out as a parade ground in 1753, and extended in 1845. It is upon this Esplanade that the Edinburgh Military Tattoo takes place annually. From the Esplanade the Half Moon Battery is prominent, with the Royal Palace to its left.

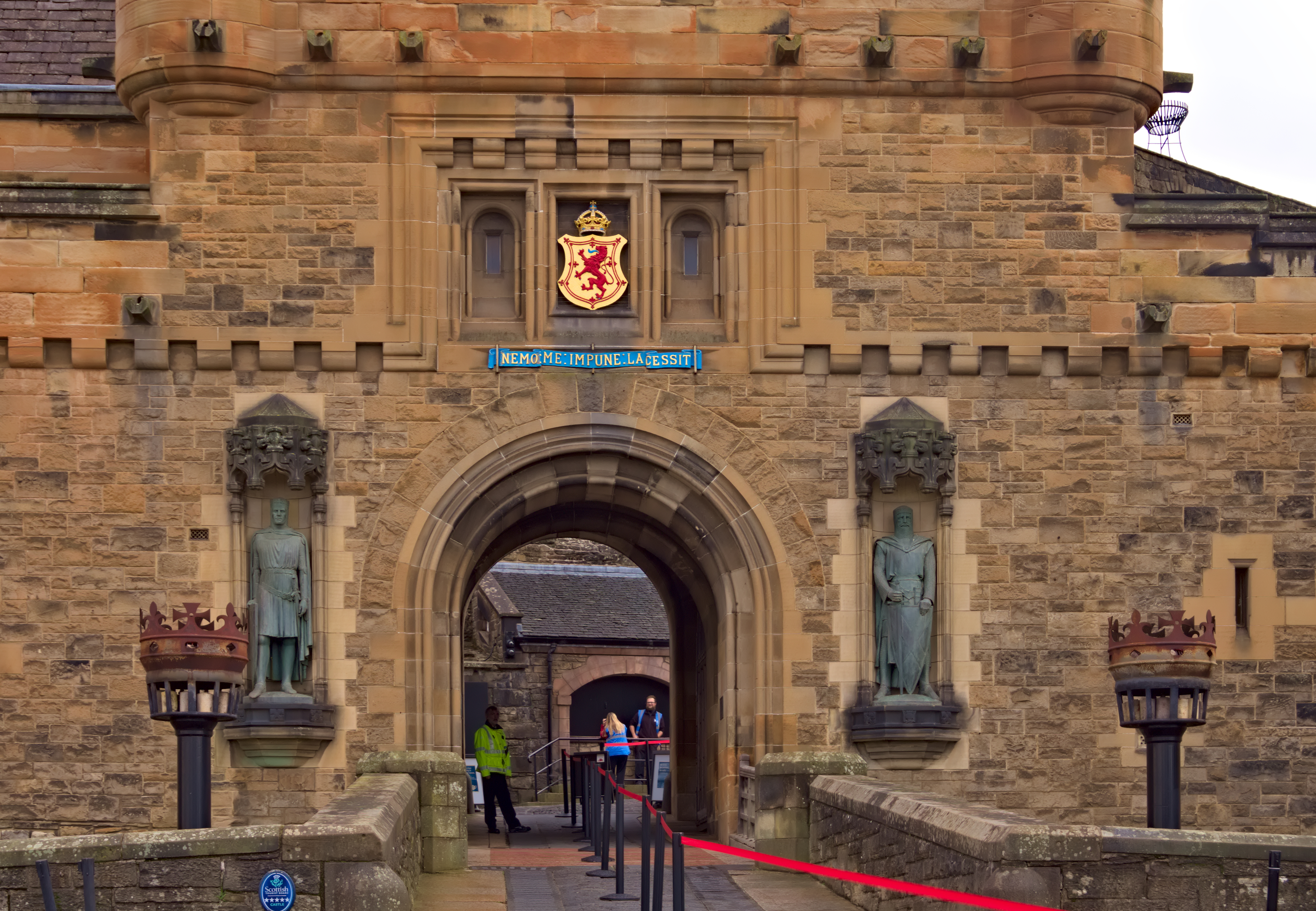
Main gate from the Esplanade into the castle (with the gatehouse)

The Gatehouse at the head of the Esplanade was built as an architecturally cosmetic addition to the castle in 1888. Statues of Robert the Bruce by Thomas Clapperton and William Wallace by Alexander Carrick were added in 1929, and the Latin motto Nemo me impune lacessit is inscribed above the gate. The dry ditch in front of the entrance was completed in its present form in 1742. Within the Gatehouse are offices, and to the north is the most recent addition to the castle; the ticket office, completed in 2008 to a design by Gareth Hoskins Architects. The road, built by James III in 1464 for the transport of cannon, leads upward and around to the north of the Half Moon Battery and the Forewall Battery, to the Portcullis Gate. In 1990, an alternative access was opened by digging a tunnel from the north of the esplanade to the north-west part of the castle, separating visitor traffic from service traffic.

=== Portcullis Gate and Argyle Tower ===
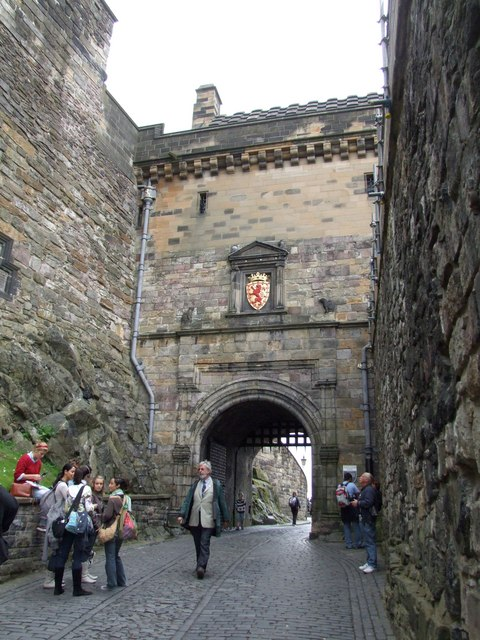
The Portcullis Gate

The Portcullis Gate was begun by the Regent Morton after the Lang Siege of 1571–73 to replace the round Constable's Tower, which was destroyed in the siege. In 1584 the upper parts of the Gatehouse were completed by William Schaw, and these were further modified in 1750. In 1886–1887 this plain building was replaced with a Scots baronial tower, designed by the architect Hippolyte Blanc, although the original Portcullis Gate remains below. The new structure was named the Argyle Tower, from the fact that the 9th Earl of Argyll had been held here prior to his execution in 1685. Described as "restoration in an extreme form", the rebuilding of the Argyle Tower was the first in a series of works funded by the publisher William Nelson.

Just inside the gate is the Argyle Battery overlooking Princes Street, with Mills Mount Battery, the location of the One O'Clock Gun, to the west. Below these is the Low Defence, while at the base of the rock is the ruined Wellhouse Tower, built in 1362 to guard St. Margaret's Well. This natural spring provided an important secondary source of water for the castle, the water being lifted up by a crane mounted on a platform known as the Crane Bastion.

=== Military buildings ===
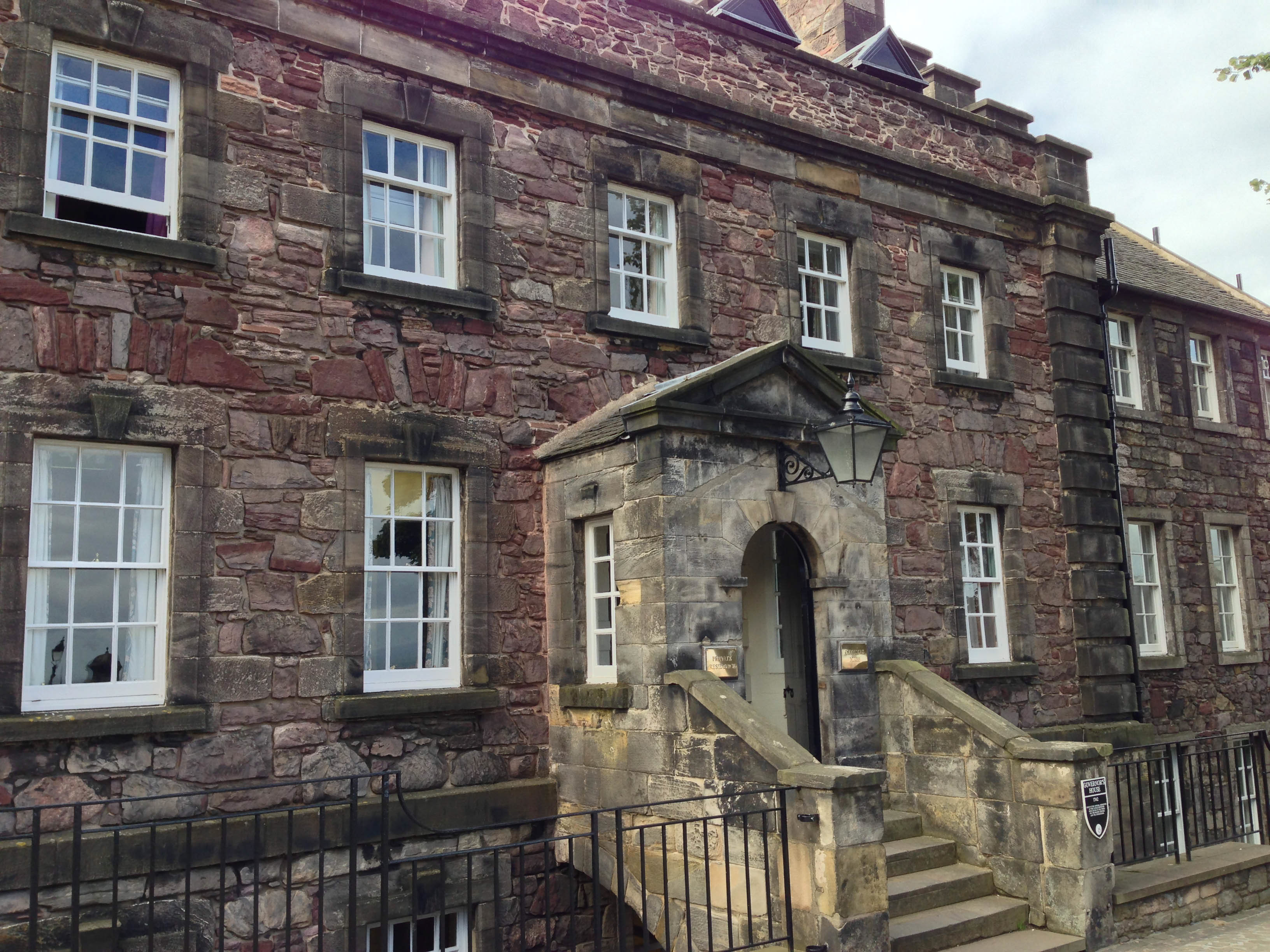
Governor's House (1742)

The areas to the north and west of the Argyle Tower are largely occupied by military buildings erected after the castle became a major garrison in the early 18th century. Adjacent to Mills Mount are the 18th-century cart sheds, now tea rooms. The Governor's House to the south was built in 1742 as accommodation for the governor, storekeeper, and master gunner, and was used until the post of governor became vacant in the later 19th century; it was then used by nurses of the castle hospital. Today, it functions as an officers' mess, and as the office of the Governor since the restoration of the post in 1936.

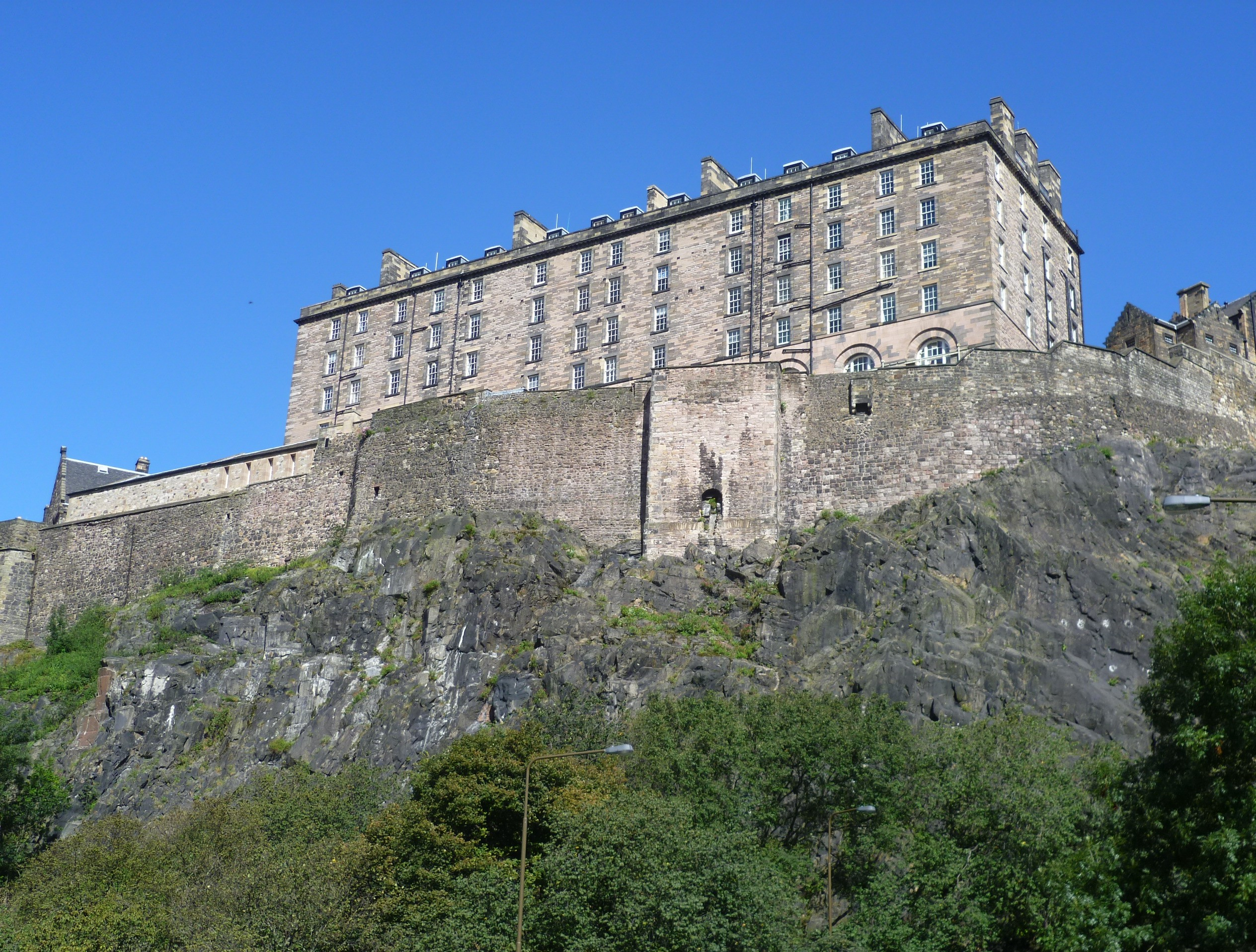
The New Barracks (1799)

South of the Governor's House is the New Barracks, completed in 1799 to house 600 soldiers, and replacing the outdated accommodation in the Great Hall. They now house the Regimental Headquarters of the Royal Regiment of Scotland and the Regimental Headquarters of the Royal Scots Dragoon Guards (Carabiniers and Greys) as well as the Royal Scots Dragoon Guards Museum. The latter was opened in 1995 by the regiment's Colonel, Queen Elizabeth II. Also nearby, in the former Royal Scots drill hall, constructed in 1900, is the Regimental Museum of the Royal Scots (The Royal Regiment). The military prison was built in 1842 as a detention block for the castle garrison and was extended in the 1880s. It was last used in 1923, when the garrison moved to the city's Redford Barracks.

==== National War Museum of Scotland ====
West of the Governor's House, a store for munitions was built in 1747–48 and later extended to form a courtyard, in which the main gunpowder magazine also stood. In 1897 the area was remodelled as a military hospital, formerly housed in the Great Hall. The building to the south of this courtyard is now the National War Museum of Scotland, which forms part of the National Museums of Scotland. It was formerly known as the Scottish United Services Museum, and, prior to this, the Scottish Naval and Military Museum, when it was located in the Queen Anne Building. It covers Scotland's military history over the past 400 years, and includes a wide range of military artefacts, such as uniforms, medals and weapons. The exhibits also illustrate the history and causes behind the many wars in which Scottish soldiers have been involved. Beside the museum is Butts Battery, named after the archery butts (targets) formerly placed here. Below it are the Western Defences, where a postern, named the West Sally Port, gives access to the western slope of the rock.

=== Upper Ward ===
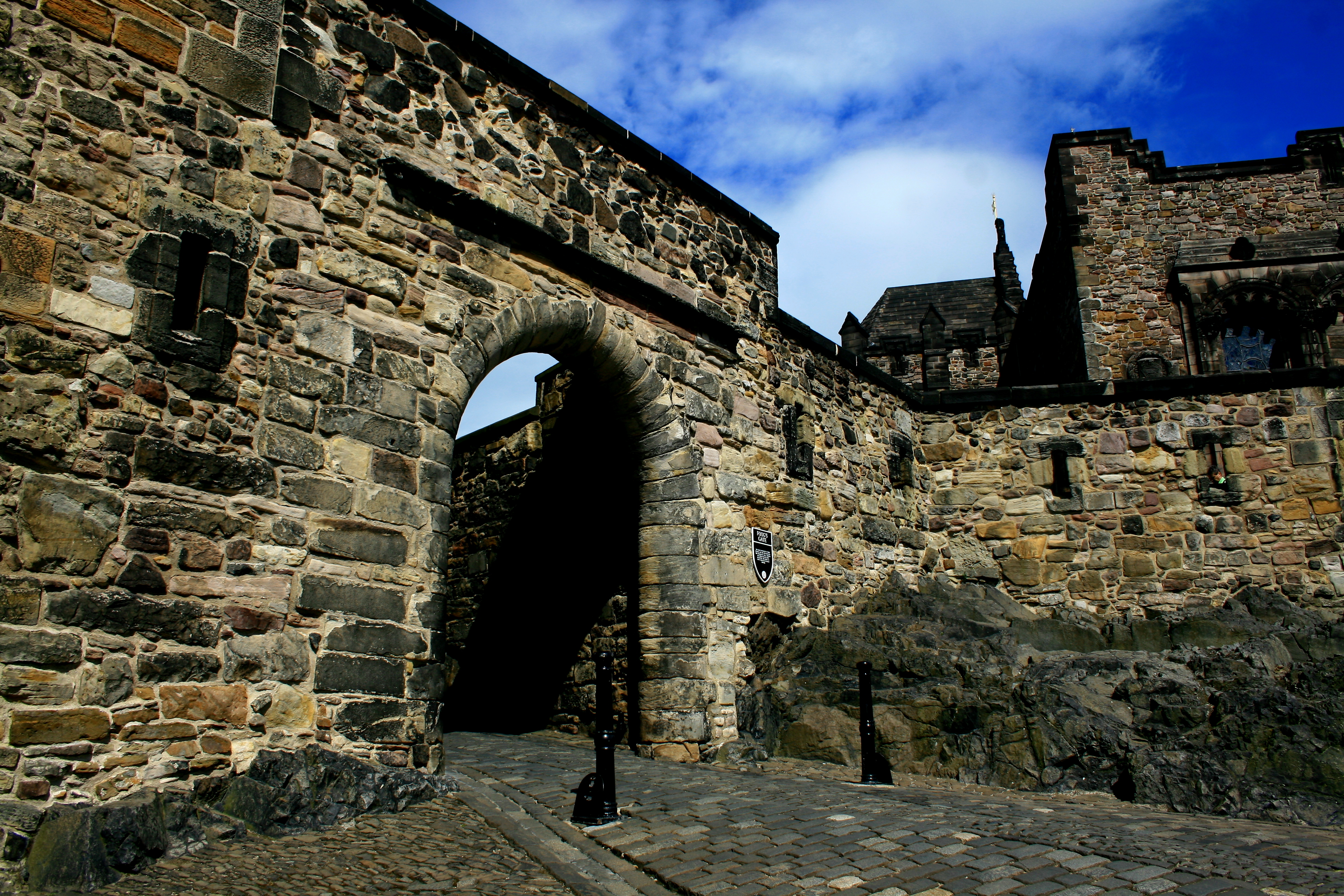
Foog's Gate

The Upper Ward or Citadel occupies the highest part of the Castle Rock, and is entered via the late 17th-century Foog's Gate. The origin of this name is unknown, although it was formerly known as the Foggy Gate, which may relate to the dense sea-fogs, known as haars, which commonly affect Edinburgh. Adjacent to the gates are the large cisterns built to reduce the castle's dependency on well water and a former fire station, now used as a shop. The summit of the rock is occupied by St Margaret's Chapel and 15th-century siege gun Mons Meg. On a ledge below this area is a small 19th-century Dogs' Cemetery for the burial of the soldiers' regimental mascots. Besides this, the Lang Stair leads down to the Argyle Battery, past a section of a medieval bastion, and gives access to the upper storey of the Argyle Tower. The eastern end of the Upper Ward is occupied by the Forewall and Half Moon Batteries, with Crown Square to the south.

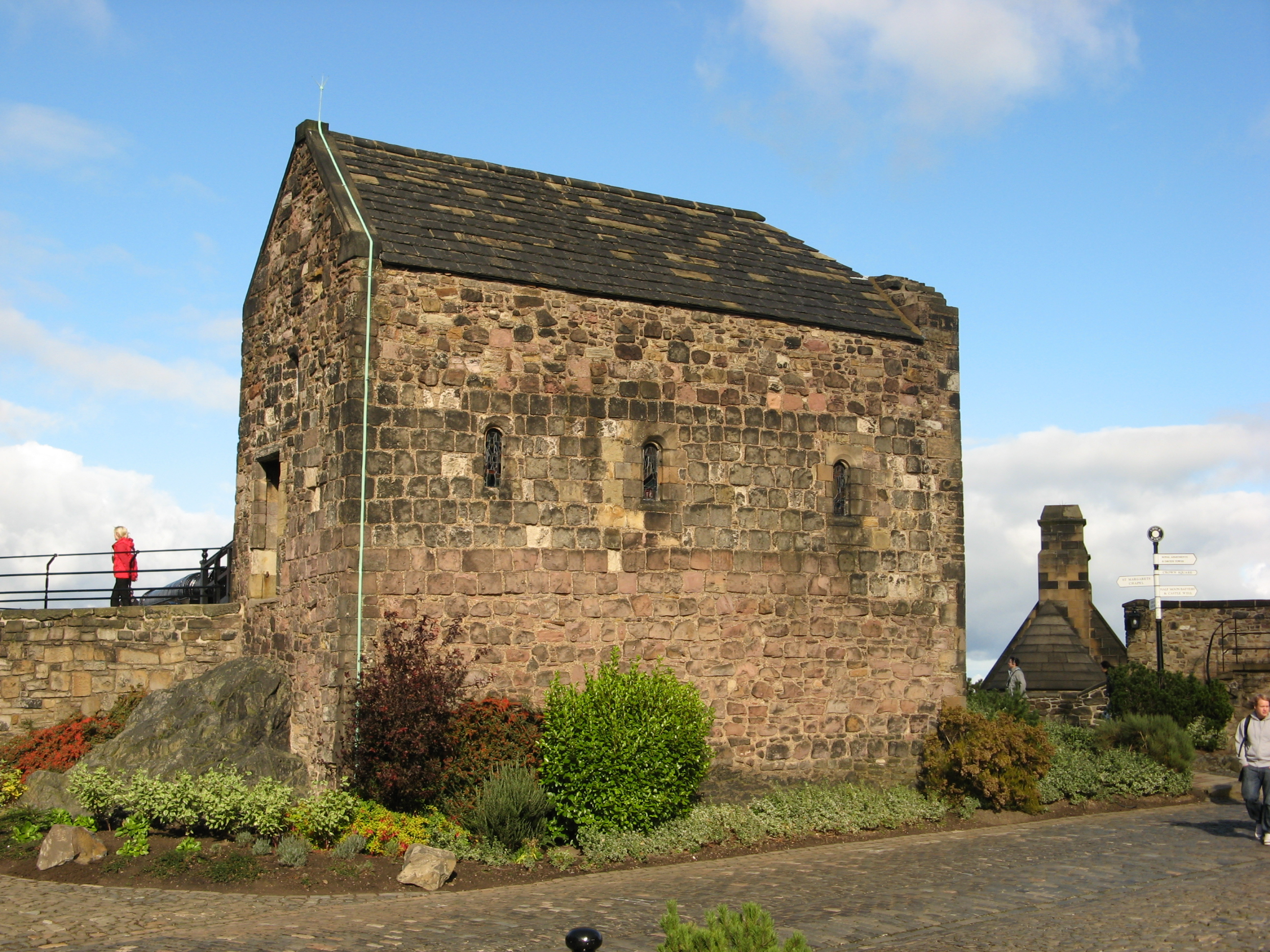
St. Margaret's Chapel

==== St. Margaret's Chapel ====
The oldest building in the castle and in Edinburgh is the small St. Margaret's Chapel. One of the few 12th-century structures surviving in any Scottish castle, it dates from the reign of King David I (r.1124–1153), who built it as a private chapel for the royal family and dedicated it to his mother, Saint Margaret of Scotland, who died in the castle in 1093. It survived the slighting of 1314, when the castle's defences were destroyed on the orders of Robert the Bruce, and was used as a gunpowder store from the 16th century when the present roof was built. In 1845, it was "discovered" by the antiquary Daniel Wilson, while in use as part of the larger garrison chapel, and was restored in 1851–1852. The chapel is still used for religious ceremonies, such as weddings.

==== Mons Meg ====
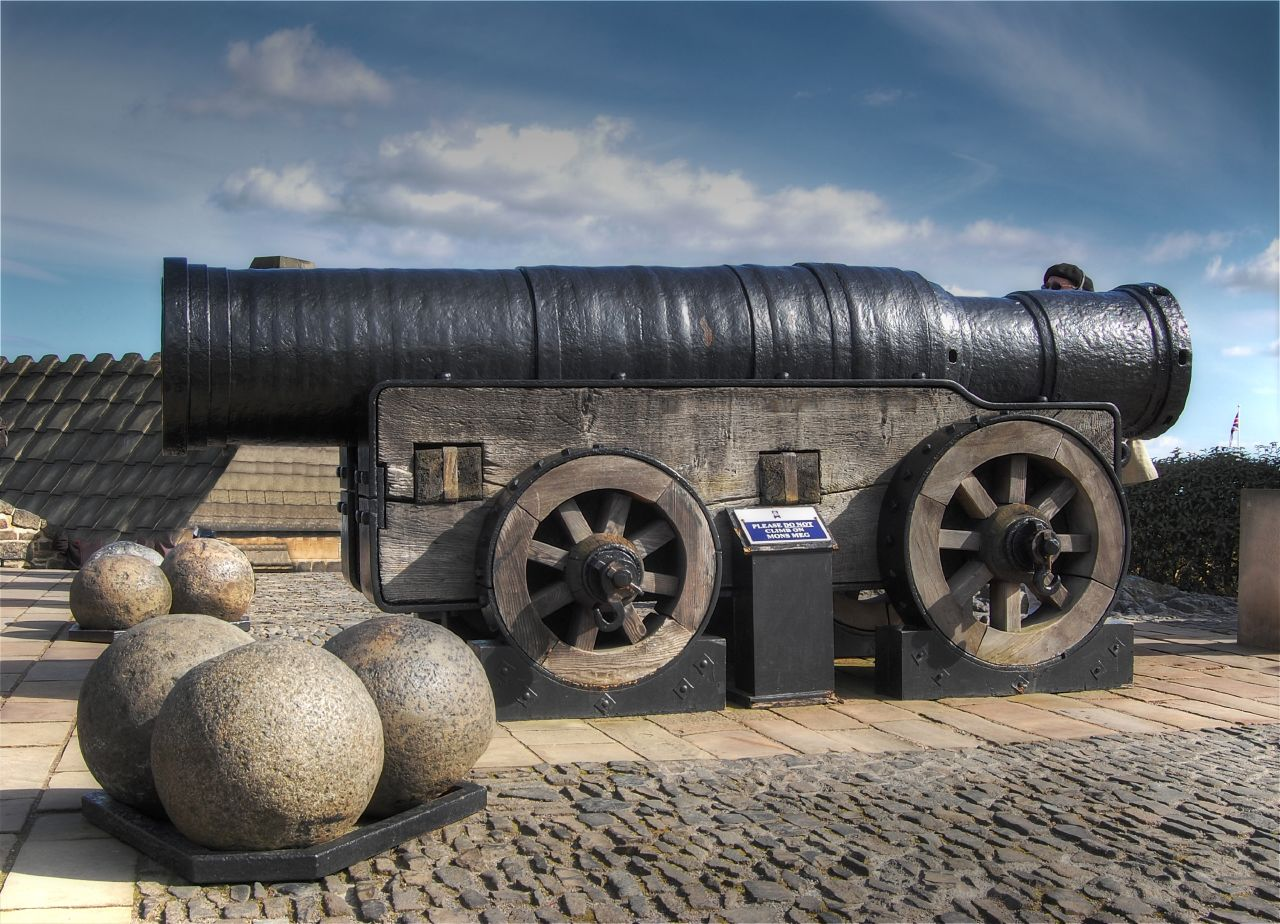
The siege gun Mons Meg, described in a 17th-century document as "the great iron murderer called Muckle-Meg" (muckle being Scots for 'big')

The 15th-century siege gun or bombard known as Mons Meg is displayed on a terrace in front of St. Margaret's Chapel. It was constructed in the Flanders on the orders of Philip III, Duke of Burgundy, in 1449, and given as a gift to King James II, the husband of his niece, in 1457. The 13,000-pound (5.9 t) gun rests on a reconstructed carriage, the details of which were copied from an old stone relief that can be seen inside the tunnel of the Gatehouse at the castle entrance. Some of Meg's large gun stones, weighing around 330 pounds (150 kg) each, are displayed alongside it. On 3 July 1558, it was fired in salute to celebrate the marriage of Mary, Queen of Scots, to the French dauphin, François II. The royal Treasurer's Accounts of the time record a payment to soldiers for retrieving one of her stones from Wardie Muir near the Firth of Forth, fully 2 miles (3 km) from the castle. The gun has been defunct since its barrel burst while firing a salute to greet the Duke of Albany, the future King James VII and II, on his arrival in Edinburgh on 30 October 1681.

==== Half Moon Battery and David's Tower ====
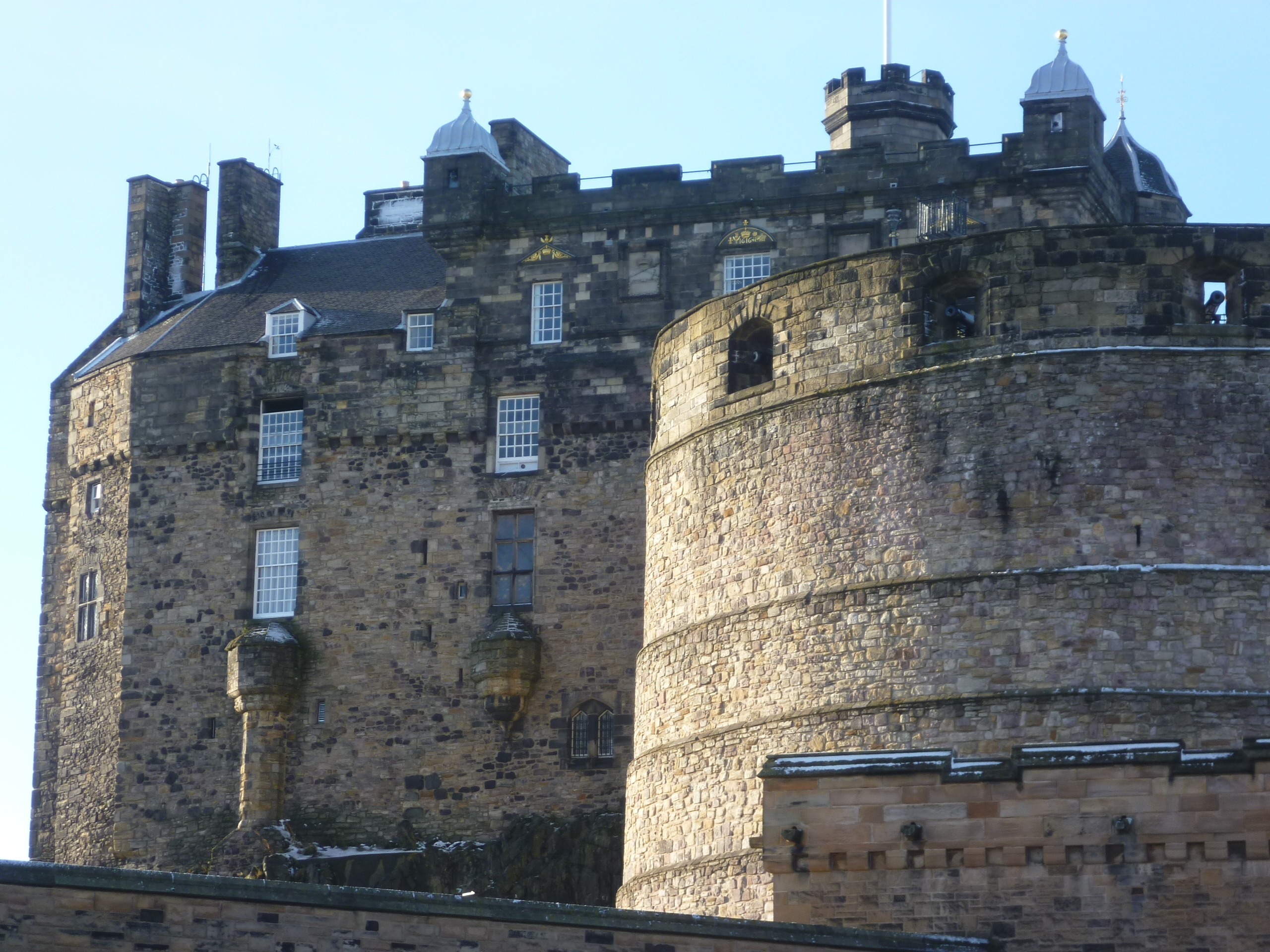
Half Moon Battery and Palace Block seen from the Esplanade

The Half Moon Battery, which remains a prominent feature on the east side of the castle, was built as part of the reconstruction works supervised by the Regent Morton, and was erected between 1573 and 1588. The Forewall to the north was built between 1689 and 1695 to link the Half Moon to the Portcullis Tower, although part of the original wall of 1540 was incorporated into it. The Half Moon Battery was built around and over the ruins of David's Tower, two storeys of which survive beneath, with windows facing out onto the interior wall of the battery. David's Tower was built on an L-plan, the main block being 51 by 38 feet (16 by 12 m), with a wing measuring 21 by 18 feet (6.4 by 5.5 m) to the west. The entrance was via a pointed-arched doorway in the inner angle, although in the 16th century this was filled in to make the tower a solid rectangle. Prior to the Lang Siege, the tower was recorded as being 59 feet (18 m) high, and the remaining portions stand up to 49 feet (15 m) from the rock.

The tower was rediscovered during routine maintenance work in 1912, and excavations below the Half Moon Battery revealed the extent of the surviving buildings. Several rooms are accessible to the public, although the lower parts are generally closed. Outside the tower, but within the battery, is a three-storey room, where large portions of the exterior wall of the tower are still visible, showing shattered masonry caused by the bombardment of 1573. Beside the tower, a section of the former curtain wall was discovered, with a gun loop which overlooked High Street: a recess was made in the outer battery wall to reveal this gun loop. In 1912–1913 the adjacent Fore Well was cleared and surveyed and was found to be 110 feet (34 m) deep, mostly hewn through the rock below the castle.

=== Crown Square ===
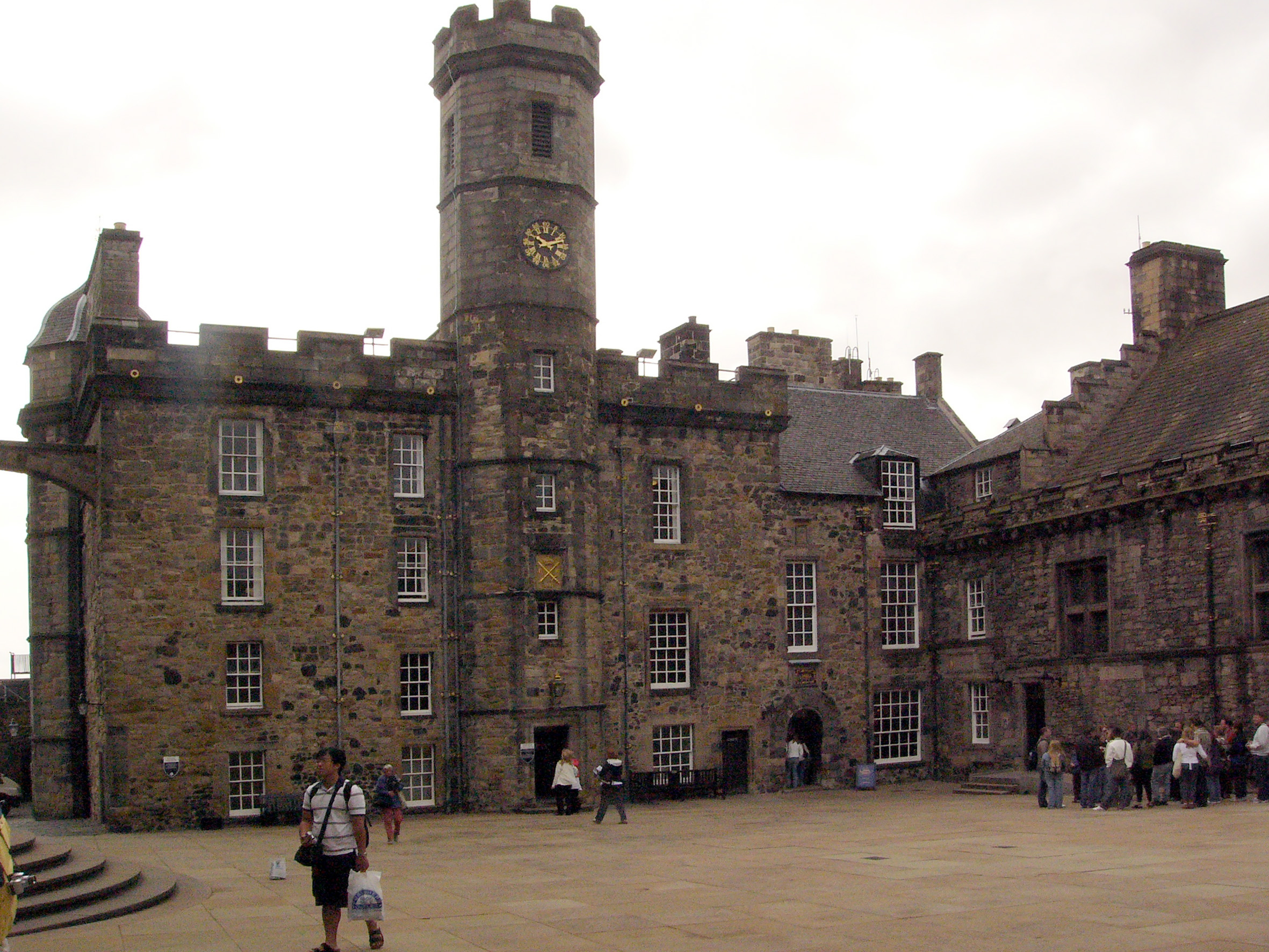
The Royal Palace in Crown Square

Crown Square, also known as Palace Yard, was laid out in the 15th century, during the reign of King James III, as the principal courtyard of the castle. The foundations were formed by the construction of a series of large stone vaults built onto the uneven Castle Rock in the 1430s. These vaults were used as a state prison until the 19th century, although more important prisoners were held in the main parts of the castle. The square is formed by the Royal Palace to the east, the Great Hall to the south, the Queen Anne Building to the west, and the National War Memorial to the north.

==== Royal Palace ====
The Royal Palace comprises the former royal apartments, which were the residence of the later Stewart monarchs. It was begun in the mid-15th century, during the reign of James IV, and it originally communicated with David's Tower. The building was extensively remodelled for the visit of James VI to the castle in 1617, when state apartments for the King and Queen were built. On the ground floor is the Laich (low) Hall, now called the King's Dining Room, and a small room, known as the Birth Chamber or Mary Room, where James VI was born to Mary, Queen of Scots, on 19 June 1566. The commemorative painted ceiling and other decorations were added in 1617. On the first floor is the vaulted Crown Room, built in 1615 to house the Honours of Scotland: the crown, the sceptre and the sword of state. The Stone of Scone, upon which the monarchs of Scotland were traditionally crowned, has been kept in the Crown Room since its return to Scotland in 1996. To the south of the palace is the Register House, built in the 1540s to accommodate state archives.

==== Great Hall ====
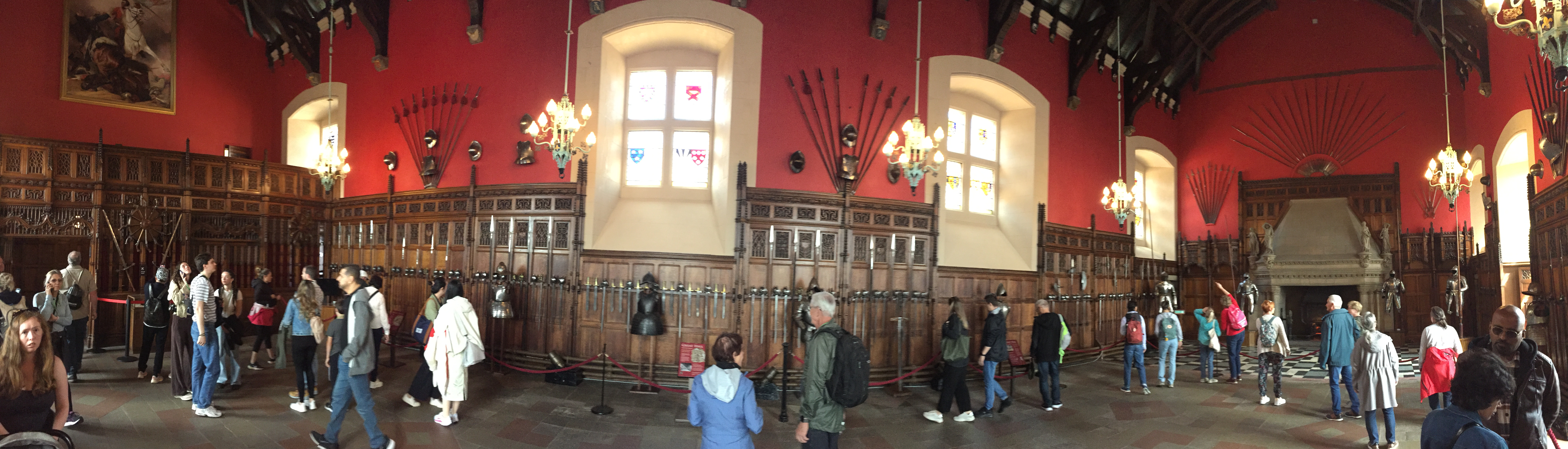
Great Hall panoramic view-Edinburgh Castle

The Great Hall measures 29 by 12.5 metres (95 by 41 ft), and was the chief place of state assembly in the castle, although there is no evidence that the Parliament of Scotland ever met here, as is sometimes reported. Historians have disagreed over its dating, although it is usually ascribed to the reign of King James IV, and is thought to have been completed in the early years of the 16th century. The decorative carved stone corbels supporting the roof have Renaissance detailing, which has been compared to works at Blois, France, of around 1515, indicating that the arts in Scotland were relatively advanced at this time. It is one of only two medieval halls in Scotland with an original hammerbeam roof.

Following Oliver Cromwell's seizure of the castle in 1650, the Great Hall was converted into a barracks for his troops; and in 1737 it was subdivided into three storeys to house 312 soldiers. Following the construction of the New Barracks in the 1790s, it became a military hospital until 1897. It was then restored by Hippolyte Blanc in line with contemporary ideas of medieval architecture. The Great Hall is still occasionally used for ceremonial occasions, and has been used as a venue on Hogmanay for BBC Scotland's Hogmanay Live programme. To the south of the hall is a section of curtain wall from the 14th century with a parapet of later date.

==== Queen Anne Building ====
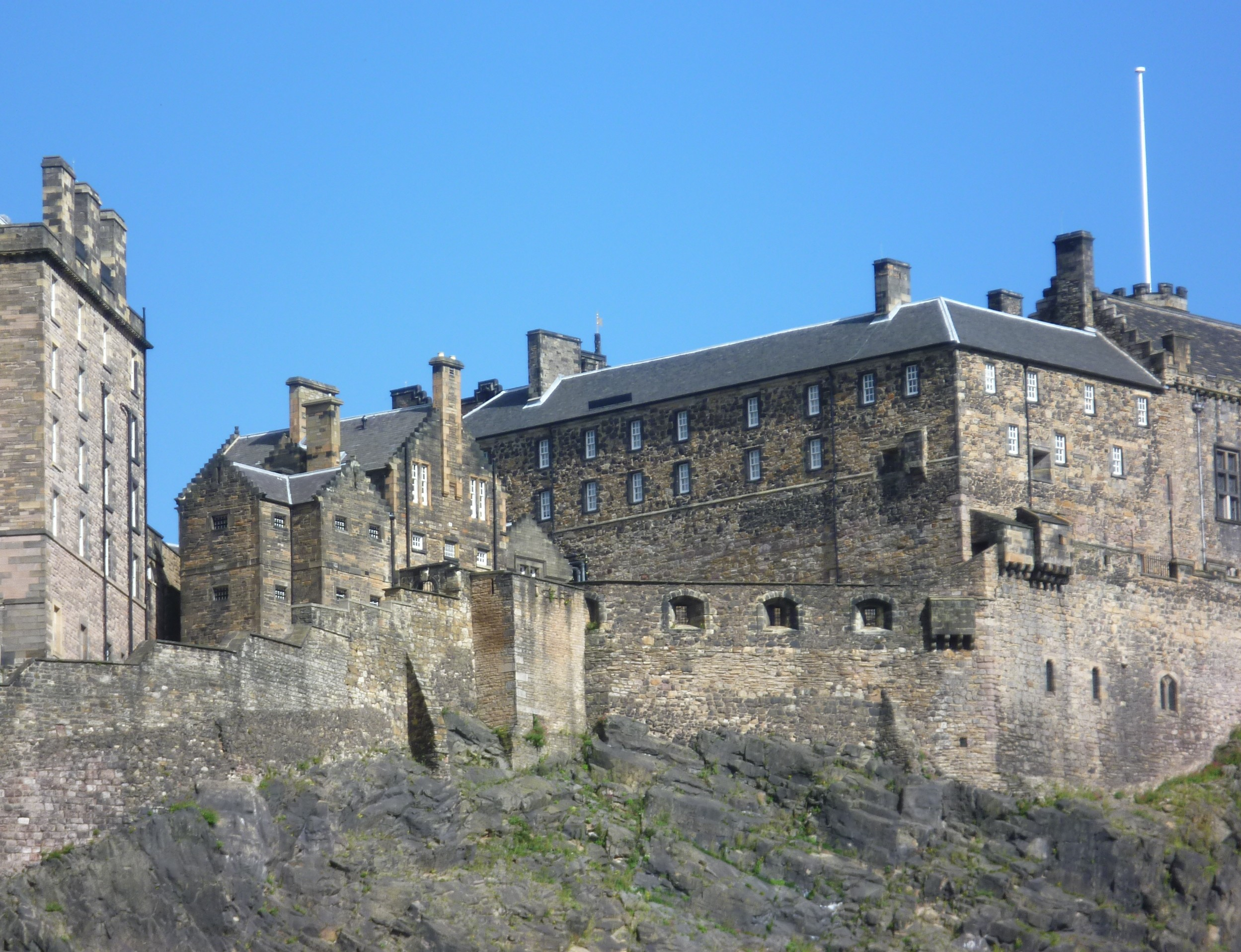
The Queen Anne Building (centre-right)

In the 16th century, this area housed the kitchens serving the adjacent Great Hall, and was later the site of the Royal Gunhouse. The present building was named after Queen Anne and was built during the attempted Jacobite invasion by the Old Pretender in 1708. It was designed by Captain Theodore Dury, military engineer for Scotland, who also designed Dury's Battery, named in his honour, on the south side of the castle in 1713. The Queen Anne Building provided accommodation for staff officers, but after the departure of the Army it was remodelled in the 1920s as the Naval and Military Museum, to complement the newly opened Scottish National War Memorial. The museum later moved to the former hospital in the western part of the castle, and the building now houses a function suite and an education centre.

==== Scottish National War Memorial ====
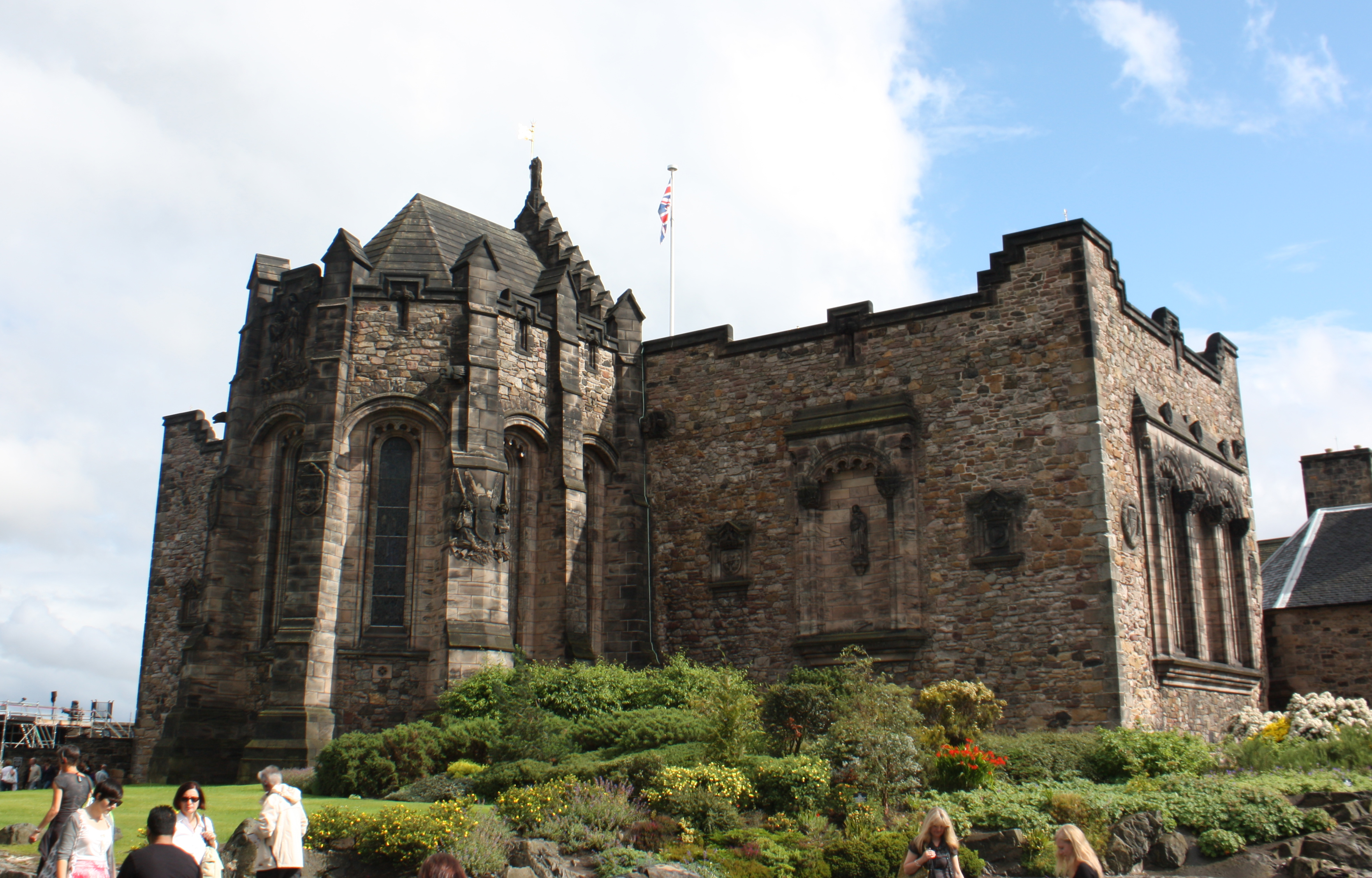
The Scottish National War Memorial

The Scottish National War Memorial occupies a converted barrack block on the north side of Crown Square. It stands on the site of the medieval St. Mary's Church which was rebuilt in 1366, and was converted into an armoury in 1540. It was demolished in 1755, and the masonry reused to build a new North Barrack Block on the site. Proposals for a Scottish National War Memorial were put forward in 1917, during the First World War, and the architect Sir Robert Lorimer was appointed in 1919. Construction began in 1923, and the memorial was formally opened on 14 July 1927 by the Prince of Wales. The exterior is decorated with gargoyles and sculpture, while the interior contains monuments to individual regiments. The stained-glass windows are by Douglas Strachan.

The memorial commemorates Scottish soldiers, and those serving with Scottish regiments, who died in the two world wars and in more recent conflicts. Upon the altar within the Shrine, placed upon the highest point of the Castle Rock, is a sealed casket containing Rolls of Honour which list over 147,000 names of those soldiers killed in the First World War. After the Second World War, another 50,000 names were inscribed on Rolls of Honour held within the Hall, and further names continue to be added there. The memorial is maintained by a charitable trust.

== Present use ==
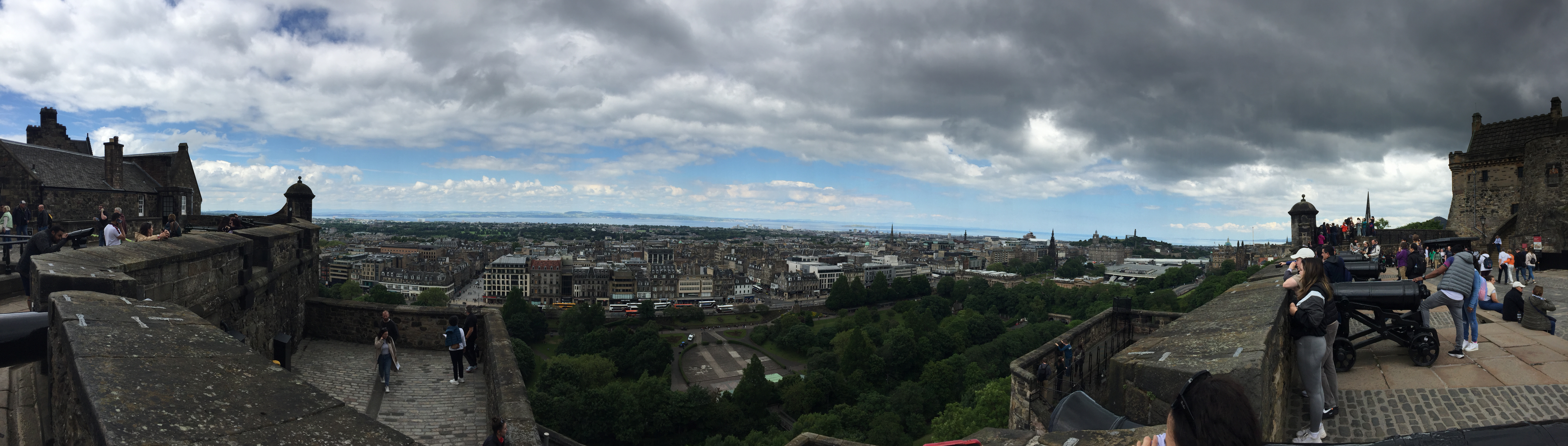
Panoramic view from Edinburgh Castle, June 2024

Edinburgh Castle is in the ownership of the Scottish Ministers as heads of the devolved Scottish Government. The castle is run and administered, for the most part, by Historic Environment Scotland, an executive agency of the Scottish Government, although the Army remains responsible for some areas, including the New Barracks block and the military museums. Both Historic Environment Scotland and the Army share use of the Guardroom immediately inside the castle entrance.

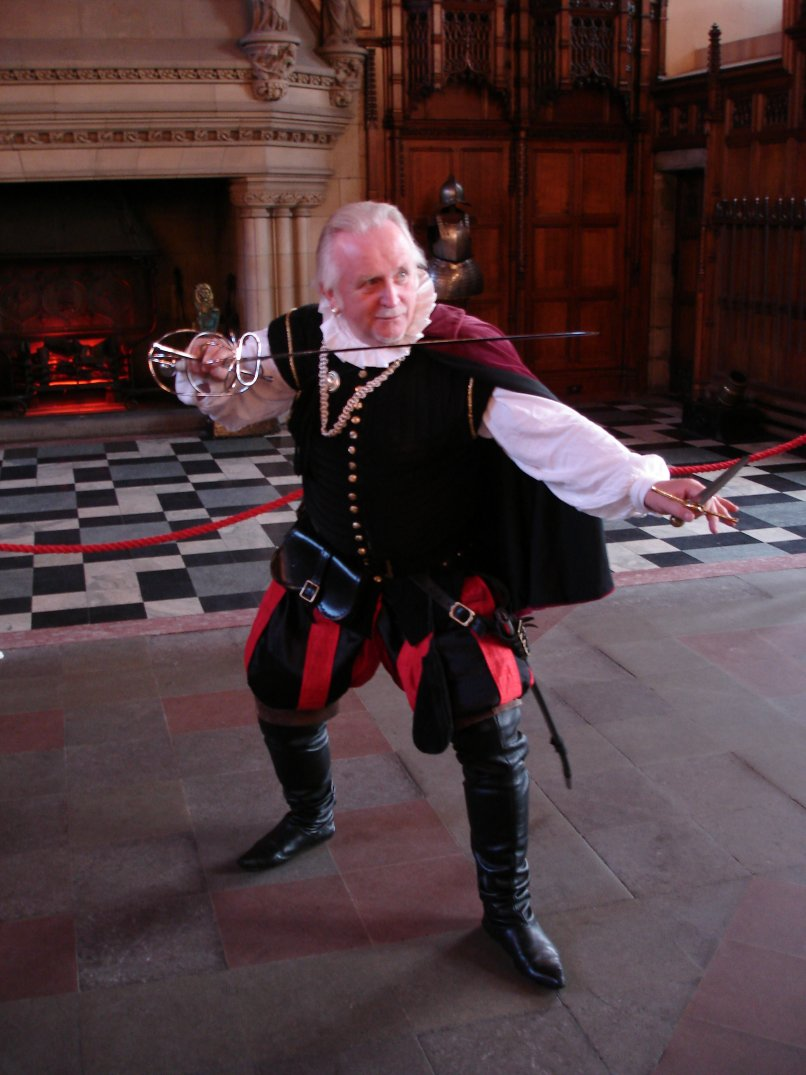
A re-enactor portraying James Hepburn, 4th Earl of Bothwell, a husband of Mary, Queen of Scots, in the Great Hall

=== Tourist attraction ===
Historic Environment Scotland undertakes the dual tasks of operating the castle as a commercially viable tourist attraction, while simultaneously bearing responsibility for conservation of the site. Edinburgh Castle remains the most popular paid visitor attraction in Scotland, with 2,044,963 visitors in 2025. Historic Environment Scotland maintains a number of facilities within the castle, including two cafés/restaurants, several shops, and numerous historical displays. An educational centre in the Queen Anne Building runs events for schools and educational groups, and employs re-enactors in costume and with period weaponry.

=== Military role ===
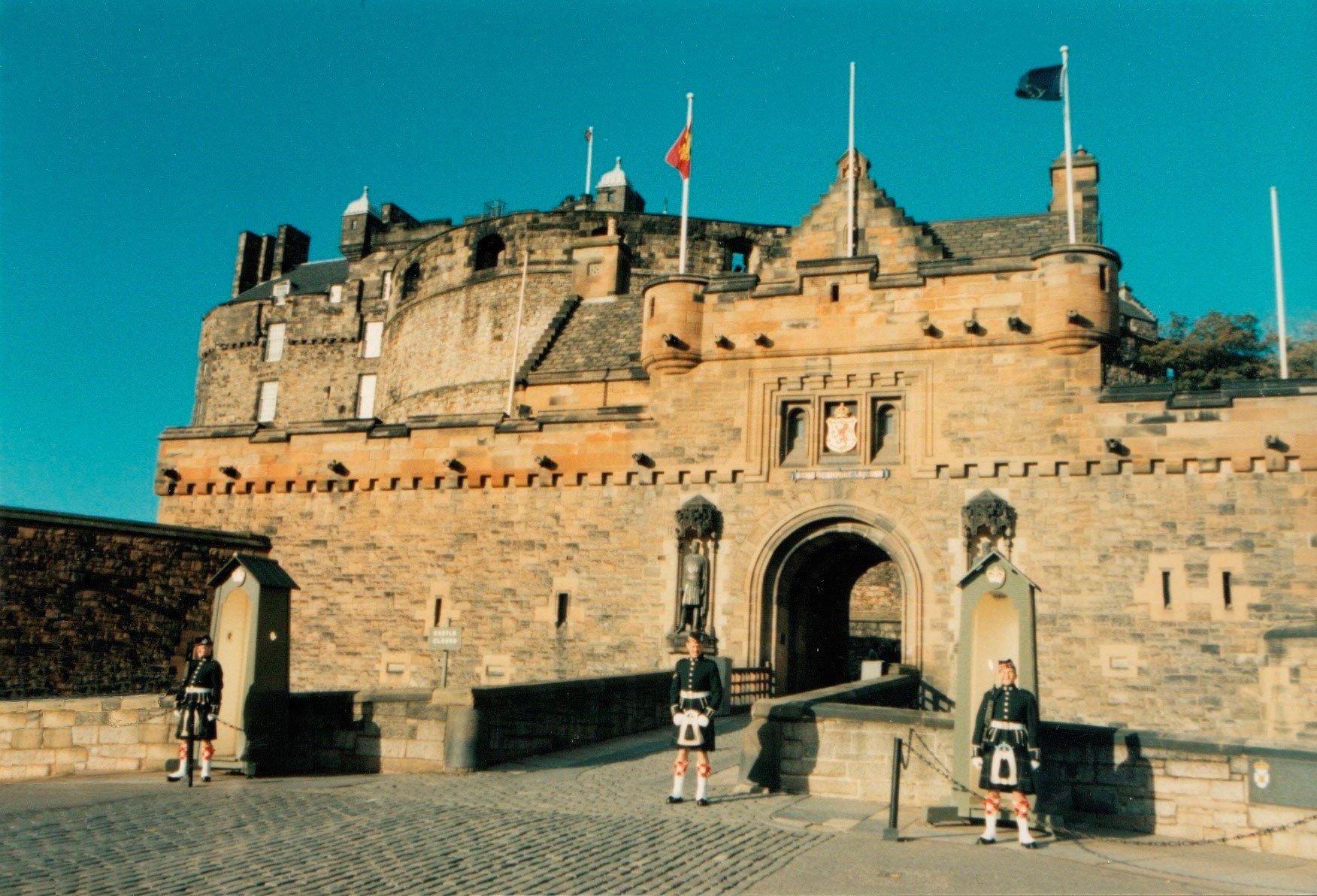
Sentries guarding the Gatehouse

Direct administration of the castle by the War Office came to an end in 1905, and in 1923 the Army formally moved to the city's new Redford Barracks. Nevertheless, the castle continues to have a strong connection with the Army, and is one of the few ancient castles in Britain that still has a military garrison, albeit for largely ceremonial and administrative purposes. Public duties performed by the garrison include guarding the Honours of Scotland, and armed sentries stand watch at the Gatehouse outside opening hours. The post of Governor of Edinburgh Castle is now a ceremonial post. The New Barracks contain both the Governor's House, which serves as the Officers' Mess, and the Regimental Headquarters of the Royal Regiment of Scotland. The Army retains responsibility for these and for the Royal Scots Museum and Royal Scots Dragoon Guards Museum.

=== Military tattoo ===
Royal Marines emerging from Edinburgh Castle during the military tattoo in 2005

A series of performances known as the Edinburgh Military Tattoo (since 2010 the Royal Edinburgh Military Tattoo) takes place on the Esplanade each year during August. The basis of each performance is a parade of the massed pipes and drums of the Scottish regiments, and since its inception in 1950 the tattoo has developed a complex format that includes a variety of performers invited from around the world, although still with a largely military focus. The climax of the evening is the lone piper on the castle battlements, playing a pibroch in memory of dead comrades-in-arms, followed by massed bands joining in a medley of traditional Scottish tunes. The tattoo attracts an annual audience of around 217,000 people, and is broadcast in some 30 countries to a television audience estimated at 100 million.

=== One O'Clock Gun ===
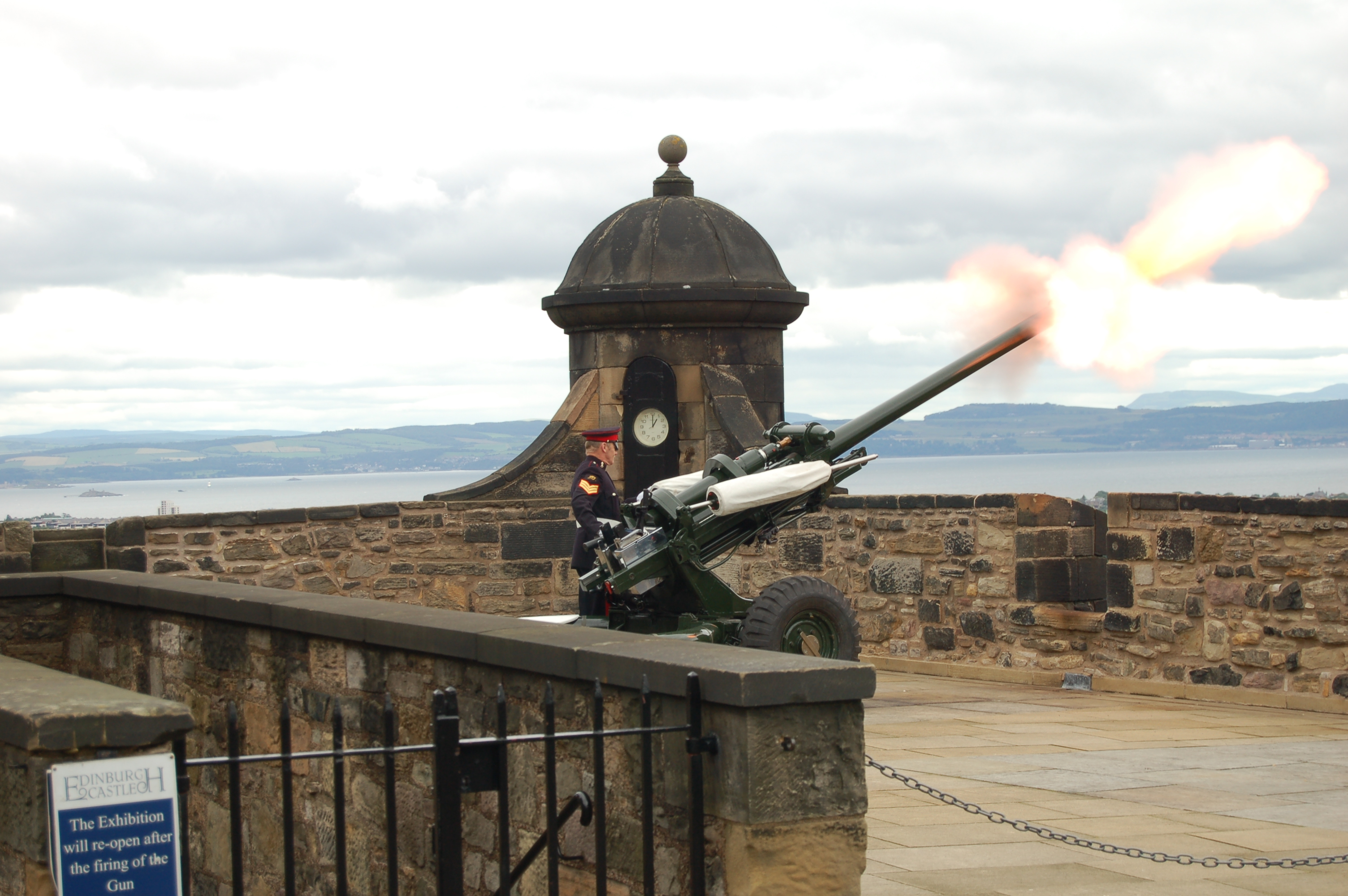
The One O'Clock Gun being fired from Mill's Mount Battery

The One O'Clock Gun is a time signal, fired every day at precisely one p.m., excepting Sunday, Good Friday and Christmas Day. The 'Time Gun' was established in 1861 as a time signal for ships in the harbour of Leith and the Firth of Forth, 2 miles (3 km) away. It complemented the 'Time Ball', which was installed on the Nelson Monument in 1852, but was useless as a visual signal in foggy weather. Because sound travels relatively slowly (approximately 343 metres per second (770 mph)), a map was produced in 1861 to show the actual time when the sound of the gun would be heard at various locations across Edinburgh.

The original gun was an 18-pound muzzle-loading cannon, which needed four men to load, and was fired from the Half Moon Battery. This was replaced in 1913 by a 32-pound breech-loader, and in May 1952 by a 25-pound Howitzer. The present One O'Clock Gun is an L118 Light Gun, brought into service on 30 November 2001.

On Sunday 2 April 1916, at an unknown time of day, the One O'Clock Gun was fired in vain at a German Zeppelin during an air raid, the gun's only known use in war.

The gun is now fired from Mill's Mount Battery, on the north face of the castle, by the District Gunner from the 105th Regiment Royal Artillery. Although the gun is no longer required for its original purpose, the ceremony has become a popular tourist attraction. The longest-serving District Gunner, Staff Sergeant Thomas McKay MBE, nicknamed "Tam the Gun", fired the One O'Clock Gun from 1979 until his retirement in January 2005. McKay helped establish the One O'Clock Gun Association, which opened a small exhibition at Mill's Mount, and published a book entitled What Time Does Edinburgh's One O'clock Gun Fire? In 2006 Sergeant Jamie Shannon, nicknamed "Shannon the Cannon", became the 29th District Gunner, and in 2006 Bombardier Allison Jones became the first woman to fire the gun.

=== Symbol of Edinburgh ===
Alfred Buckham's "Aerial View of Edinburgh", from about 1920

The castle has become a recognisable symbol of Edinburgh, and of Scotland. It appears, in stylised form, on the coats of arms of the City of Edinburgh Council and the University of Edinburgh. It also features on the badge of No. 603 (City of Edinburgh) Squadron which was based at RAF Turnhouse (now Edinburgh Airport) during Second World War. Images of the castle are used as a logo by organisations including Edinburgh Rugby, the Edinburgh Evening News, Hibernian F.C. and the Edinburgh Marathon. It also appears on the "Castle series" of Royal Mail postage stamps, and has been represented on various issues of banknotes issued by Scottish clearing banks. In the 1960s the castle was illustrated on £5 notes issued by the National Commercial Bank of Scotland, and since 1987 it has featured on the reverse of £1 notes issued by the Royal Bank of Scotland. Since 2009 the castle, as part of Edinburgh's World Heritage Site, has appeared on £10 notes issued by the Clydesdale Bank. The castle is a focal point for annual fireworks displays which mark Edinburgh's Hogmanay (new year) celebrations, and the end of the Edinburgh Festival in the summer.

== See also ==
- Banknotes of Scotland (featured on design)
- List of governors of Edinburgh Castle
- List of castles in Scotland
- Military history of Scotland
- Armed forces in Scotland
- History of Edinburgh
- Stone of Scone

== Bibliography ==
- Ashmole, Myrtle (1981). Harpers Handbook to Edinburgh. Noel Collins. ISBN 978-0-907686-00-2.
- Caldwell, David H (1981). "Royal Patronage of Arms and Armour Making". In Caldwell, David H (ed.). Scottish Weapons and Fortifications 1100–1800. John Donald. ISBN 978-0-85976-047-8.
- Caldwell, David H (National Museums of Scotland) (2014). "Besieged". Historic Scotland Magazine: 20–24.
- Camden, William (1607). "Lauden or Lothien". Britannia. trans. Philemon Holland.
- Chambers, Robert (1859). Edinburgh Papers: Ancient Domestic Architecture of Edinburgh: Edinburgh Castle as before the Siege of 1573. Edinburgh: Wm & Rob't Chambers.
- Cruden, Stewart (1981). The Scottish Castle (3rd ed.). Spurbooks. ISBN 978-0-7157-2088-2.
- Devine, T.M. (2000). The Scottish Nation: 1700–2000. Penguin. ISBN 978-0-14-023004-8.
- Driscoll, S.T.; Yeoman, Peter (1997). Excavations within Edinburgh Castle in 1988–91. Society of Antiquaries of Scotland. ISBN 978-0-903903-12-7.
- Dunbar, John (1999). Scottish Royal Palaces: The Architecture of the Royal Residences during the Late Medieval and Early Renaissance Periods. Tuckwell Press. ISBN 978-1-86232-042-0.
- Fenwick, Hugh (1976). Scotland's Castles. Robert Hale. ISBN 978-0-7091-5731-1.
- Fernie, Eric (1987). "Early church architecture in Scotland" (PDF). Proceedings of the Society of Antiquaries of Scotland. 116: 393–411. doi:10.9750/PSAS.116.393.411. S2CID 55675266.
- Geoffrey of Monmouth (1966). Lewis G. M. Thorpe (ed.). The History of the Kings of Britain. Penguin Classics. ISBN 978-0-14-044170-3.
- Gibson, John Sibbald (1995). Edinburgh in the '45. Saltire Society. ISBN 978-0-85411-067-4.
- Gillies, James (1886). Edinburgh Past And Present. Oliphant, Anderson & Ferrier. ISBN 978-1-4086-6024-9.
- Grant, James (1850). Memorials of the Castle of Edinburgh. Oxford: Oxford University Press.
- Grant, James (c. 1890). Old and New Edinburgh. Vol. I. Cassell and Co. p. 15.
- Gray, W. Forbes (1948). A Short History of Edinburgh Castle. Edinburgh: Moray Press.
- Halkerston, Peter (1831). A Treatise on the History, Law, and Privileges of the Palace and Sanctuary of Holyroodhouse. Maclachlan and Stewart. ISBN 978-1-4097-8829-4.
- Hardie, Alastair M R (2004). Edinburgh's Castle in the Air. London: Serendpity. ISBN 978-1-84394-111-8.
- Harris, Stuart (2002). The Place Names of Edinburgh: Their Origins and History. London: Steve Savage Publishers. ISBN 978-1-904246-06-0.
- Howard, Deborah (1995). Scottish Architecture from the Reformation to the Restoration, 1560–1660. The Architectural History of Scotland. Edinburgh University Press. ISBN 978-0-7486-0530-9.
- Hussey, Christopher (1931). The Work of Sir Robert Lorimer. London:Country Life.
- Lynch, Michael (1992). Scotland: A New History. Pimlico. ISBN 978-0-7126-9893-1.
- Macritchie, David (14 March 1838). "Notes on the Words Men and Maiden in British Topography" (PDF). Proceedings of the Society of Antiquaries of Scotland. XXXII: 158–166.
- McAdam, David (2003). Edinburgh and West Lothian: a landscape fashioned by geology. Scottish Natural Heritage. ISBN 978-1-85397-327-7.
- McGrail, Thomas H (1940). Sir William Alexander, First Earl of Stirling: A biographical study. Oliver & Boyd.
- McHardy, Stuart (2007). Tales of Edinburgh Castle. Luath. ISBN 978-1-905222-95-7.
- MacIvor, Iain (1981). "Artillery and Major Places of Strength in the Lothians". In Caldwell, David H (ed.). Scottish Weapons and Fortifications 1100–1800. John Donald. ISBN 978-0-85976-047-8.
- MacIvor, Iain (1993). Edinburgh Castle. B. T. Batsford. ISBN 978-0-7134-7295-0.
- McKay, Tam (2002). What Time Does Edinburgh's One O'clock Gun Fire?. Cadies/Witchery Tours. ISBN 978-0-9522927-3-9.
- McKean, Charles (1991). Edinburgh, Portrait of a City. Ebury Press. ISBN 978-0-7126-3867-8.
- MacQuarrie, Alan (2004). Medieval Scotland: Kingship and Nation. The History Press. ISBN 978-0-7509-2977-6.
- McWilliam, Colin; Gifford, John; Walker, David (1984). Edinburgh. The Buildings of Scotland. Penguin. ISBN 978-0-14-071068-7.
- Masson, Rosaline, ed. (1912). In Praise of Edinburgh, an Anthology in Prose and Verse. Constable and Co.
- Moffat, Alistair (2005). Before Scotland: The Story of Scotland Before History. Thames & Hudson. ISBN 978-0-500-05133-7.
- Oldrieve, W. T. (1914). "Account of the recent discovery of the Remains of David's Tower at Edinburgh Castle" (PDF). Proceedings of the Society of Antiquaries of Scotland. 48: 230–270. doi:10.9750/PSAS.048.230.270. S2CID 254528810. Archived from the original (PDF) on 23 May 2012.
- Paul, James Balfour, ed. (1913). Accounts of the Lord High Treasurer of Scotland. Vol. X. Edinburgh: H.M. General Register House.
- Pitcairn, Robert, ed. (1833). Criminal trials in Scotland, from 1488 to 1624. Vol. 2. Edinburgh: William Tait.
- Potter, Harry (2003). Edinburgh Under Siege: 1571–1573. Tempus. ISBN 978-0-7524-2332-6.
- Salter, Mike (1994). The Castles of Lothian and the Borders. Folly Publications. ISBN 978-1-871731-20-0.
- Scott, Andrew Murray (2000). Bonnie Dundee. John Donald. ISBN 978-0-85976-532-9.
- Scott-Moncrieff, George (1965). Edinburgh. ISBN 978-0-05-001829-3.
- Tabraham, Chris (1997). Scotland's Castles. BT Batsford/Historic Scotland. ISBN 978-0-7134-7965-2.
- Tabraham, Chris; Grove, Doreen (2001). Fortress Scotland and the Jacobites. Batsford. ISBN 978-0-7134-7484-8.
- Tabraham, Chris (2004). Edinburgh Castle: Prisons of War. Historic Scotland. ISBN 978-1-903570-99-9.
- Tabraham, Chris (2008). Edinburgh Castle: Official Guide. Historic Scotland. ISBN 978-1-903570-33-3.
- Tyler, Royall, ed. (1914). Calendar of State Papers, Spain, Volume 10: 1550-1552.
- Wilson, Daniel (1887). "Notice of St Margaret's Chapel, Edinburgh Castle" (PDF). Proceedings of the Society of Antiquaries of Scotland. 21: 291–316. doi:10.9750/PSAS.021.291.316. S2CID 195390950. Archived from the original (PDF) on 23 May 2012.
- Wilson, Daniel (1891). Memorials of Edinburgh in the Olden Time. Vol. 1 (2nd ed.). Adam & Charles Black.
