= British Rail Class 91 =

Class of high-speed electric locomotives

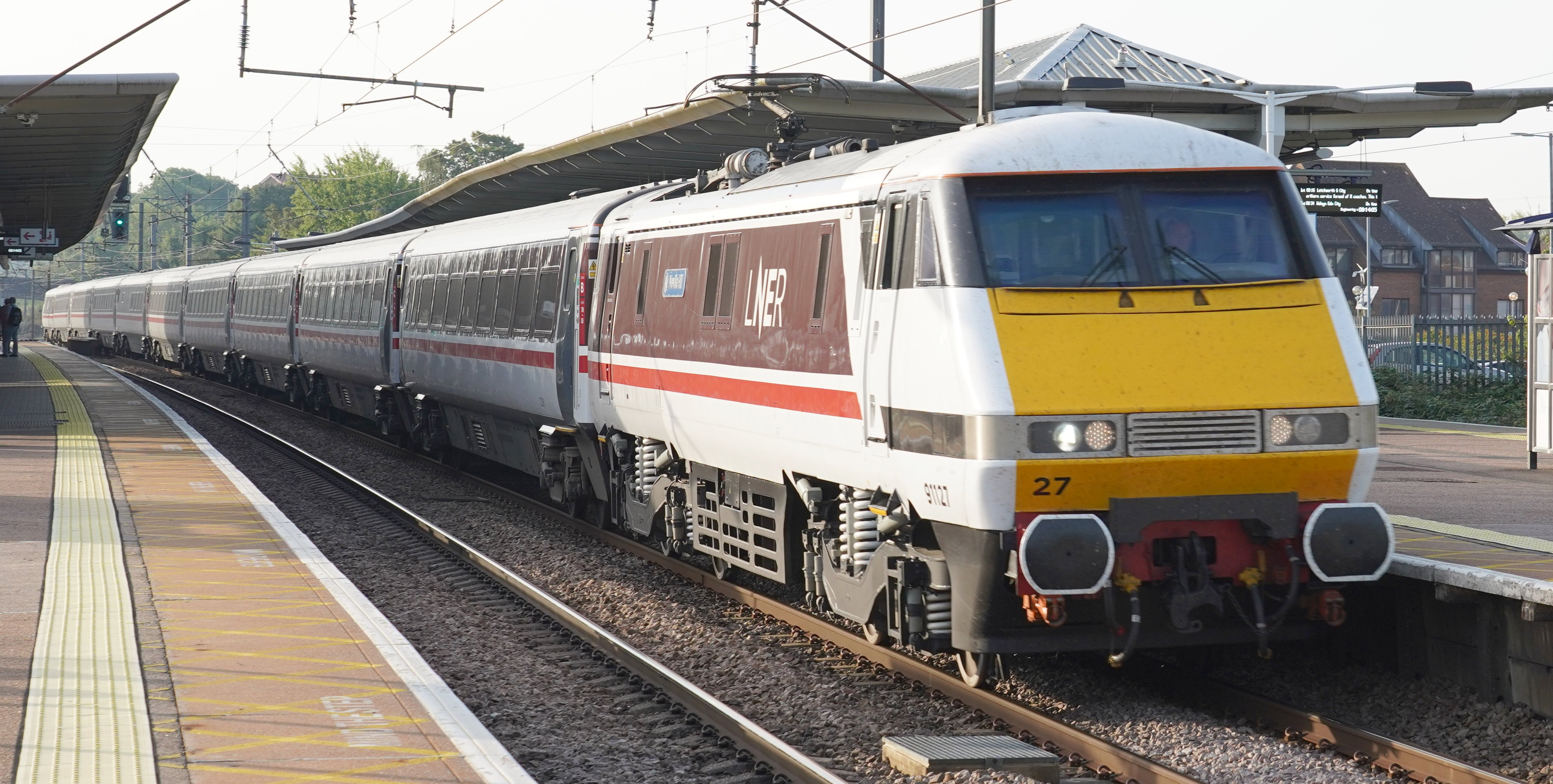
- LNER Class 91 passing Potters Bar
Type and origin
- Power type: Electric
- Designer: GEC Transportation Projects
- Builder: BREL Crewe Works
- Build date: 1988–1991
- Total produced: 31
- Rebuilder: Adtranz
- Rebuild date: 2000–2003
- Number rebuilt: 31
Specifications
- Configuration
  - AAR: B-B
  - UIC: Bo′Bo′
  - Commonwealth: Bo-Bo
- Gauge: 1,435 mm (4 ft 8 1/2 in) standard gauge
- Bogies: BREL BP52
- Wheel diameter: 970 mm (3 ft 2.19 in)
- Minimum curve: 80.000 m (262 ft 5.61 in)
- Wheelbase: 10.500 m (34 ft 5 3/8 in)
  - Bogie: 3.350 m (10 ft 11.9 in)
- Length
  - Over body: 19.400 m (63 ft 7 3/4 in)
- Width: 2.740 m (8 ft 11 7/8 in)
- Height: 3.757 m (12 ft 3 15/16 in)
- Loco weight: 85.25 tonnes (83.90 long tons; 93.97 short tons)
- Electric system/s: 25 kV 50 Hz AC overhead
- Current pickups: Pantograph; (Brecknell Willis high speed)
- Traction motors: 4 × GEC G426AZ DC
- Gear ratio: 1.741:1
- MU working: TDM
- Train heating: Electric Train Supply, index 95; (1000 V, 600 A, max 475 kW)
- Loco brake: Pneumatic (disc and tread) and rheostatic (Note: The rheostatic brake is the primary locomotive and train brake and is used at speeds down to approximately 30 mph (48 km/h). Below this speed it is blended with the conventional pneumatic brakes.)
- Train brakes: Pneumatic
- Safety systems: AWS; TPWS
- Couplers: Drophead Buckeye
Performance figures
- Maximum speed: Design: 140 mph (225 km/h); Service: 125 mph (201 km/h); No. 2 cab leading: 110 mph (177 km/h); As light locomotive: 75 mph (121 km/h) (Note: Imposed to ensure that the locomotive can be adequately braked by the friction brakes alone in the event that the rheostatic brake fails.)
- Power output
  - Starting: 4.70 MW (6,300 hp) at rails
  - Continuous: 4.54 MW (6,090 hp) at rails
- Tractive effort
  - Starting: 190 kN (43,000 lb_{f})
  - Continuous: 107 kN (24,000 lb_{f}) at 95 mph (153 km/h)
- Brakeforce: Rheostatic: 83 kN (19,000 lb_{f}) max. (Note: Maximum rheostatic brakeforce is available between speeds of approximately 60 to 125 mph (97 to 201 km/h). Below 60 mph the maximum effort available decreases linearly to zero, and above 125 mph it is limited to 50 kN (11,000 lb_{f}).)
Career
- Operators: Current: London North Eastern Railway; Europhoenix; Former: British Rail (InterCity); Great North Eastern Railway; National Express East Coast; East Coast (DOR); Virgin Trains East Coast
- Numbers: As built: 91001–91031; Post 2000–2003 refit: 91101–91122, 91124–91132
- Official name: Electra
- Axle load class: Route availability 7
- Current owner: Eversholt Rail Group; Europhoenix
- Disposition: In service: 12; Stored: 2; Scrapped: 16; Preserved: 1

The British Rail Class 91 Electra is a high-speed electric locomotive, which produces power of 4,830 kW (6,480 hp); it was ordered as a component of the East Coast Main Line modernisation and electrification programme of the late 1980s. The Class 91s were given the auxiliary name of InterCity 225 to indicate their envisaged top speed of 225 km/h (140 mph); they were also referred to as Electras by British Rail during their development and throughout the electrification of the East Coast Main Line.

The locomotive body shells are of all-steel construction. Unusually, the motors are body mounted and drive bogie-mounted gearboxes via cardan shafts; this reduces the unsprung mass and hence track wear at high speeds. The locomotive also features an underslung transformer, therefore the body is relatively empty compared to contemporary electric locomotives. Much of the engineering specification for the locomotive was derived from the research and operational experience of the APT-P.

The other end of the InterCity 225 train set is formed of a Mark 4 Driving Van Trailer, built with a similar body shell to the Class 91 locomotives but with only one driving cab.

== History ==
=== Background ===
The origins of the Class 91 are closely associated with the East Coast Main Line (ECML) on which it has been primarily operated. During the 1950s, British Rail had considered electrification of the ECML to be of equal importance to the West Coast Main Line (WCML), but various political factors led to the envisioned electrification programme being delayed for decades; as alternative, high-speed diesel traction, the Deltic and then the InterCity 125, was introduced upon the route during the 1960s and 1970s. During the 1970s, a working group of British Rail and Department of Transport officials determined that, out of all options for further electrification, the ECML represented the best value by far. Its in-house forecasts determined that increases in revenue and considerable reductions in energy and maintenance costs would occur by electrifying the line.

Accordingly, between 1976 and 1991, the ECML was electrified with 25 kV AC overhead lines. The electrification was installed in two phases: The first phase between London (King's Cross) and Hitchin (including the Hertford Loop Line) was carried out between 1976 and 1978 as the Great Northern Suburban Electrification Project, using Mk. 3A equipment, covering 30 miles (48 km) in total. In 1984, the second phase commenced to electrify the northern section to Edinburgh and Leeds. During the late 1980s, the programme was claimed to be the longest construction site in the world, spanning more than 250 miles (400 km).

In 1989 the InterCity 225 was officially introduced to revenue service. That same year, the ECML had been energised through to York; two years later, electrification had reached Edinburgh, allowing electric services to begin on 8 July 1991, eight weeks later than scheduled. The ECML electrification programme was completed at a cost of £344.4 million (at 1983 prices), a minor overrun against its authorised expenditure of £331.9 million. 40 per cent of the total cost was on new traction and rolling stock and 60 per cent for the electrification of the line.

=== Options and selection ===
The electrification of the ECML necessitated the procurement of new high speed electric traction. The options and requirements for this trainset were hotly deliberated for a number of years. On 7 June 1978, the electric-powered prototype Advanced Passenger Train (APT) was unveiled; it was at one point intended for the APT to be the next major intercity express train. However, due to various factors including technical issues, the APT programme was curtailed during the summer of 1983. Shortly thereafter, two alternative options were explored, an electrified version of the InterCity 125 (known as the HST-E), and the Class 89 mixed-traffic locomotive; these were both intended to a peak service speed of 125 mph (200 km/h).

Some officials within British Rail pushed for more demanding requirements for the future Intercity trainset; reportedly, BR's Director of Mechanical and Electrical Engineering (M&EE) was a strong proponent for increasing the top speed to 140 mph (230 km/h). To facilitate this, tilting train technologies developed for the APT were explored. While BR's board had approved the ordering of a single Class 89 as a prototype, the Strategy Committee queried why the type had been favoured over a proposed 80-tonne Bo-Bo locomotive. While the Class 89 was thought to be a low-risk option for multi-purpose traction, it offered little advantage over the existing Class 87 in terms of speed. At the time, the 1950s era Class 81 and Class 85 electric locomotives were nearing the end of their viable service lives and were quite unreliable, but their withdrawal had effectively been ruled out by a national shortage of newer electric traction, in part caused by the APT's cancellation.

A key advantage of the InterCity 225 concept over a Class 89-hauled consist was the lower weight of the former, resulting in less slippage and greater acceleration over the latter. Appraisals also determined that the Class 89 was comparatively inferior in financial terms, in part due to the InterCity 225's prospective compatibility with WCML traction, reducing its development costs. A further cost-saving measure was the decision to base the InterCity 225's technologies on the APT. BR reportedly stated that it had derived 90% of the former's engineering from the latter. Thus, the study group recommended that the InterCity 225 be pursued as the preferred option, while the Class 89 and HST-E initiatives serve as back-ups. Despite this, the HST-E effort was promptly aborted, while Brush Traction decided to de-prioritise work on the Class 89 after learning that it was unlikely to lead to volume production.

By spring 1984, favour was being given towards the adoption of a tilting carriage, tentatively designated as the Mk 4; this was viewed as superior to the existing Mk 3 and enabled a single design to be shared between the ECML and WCML. At one point, it was envisaged that the InterCity 225 would be extremely ubiquitous, even potentially having the capability built into it to operate over the southern third-rail network and within the Channel Tunnel; by mid 1984, such proposals were curtailed. Furthermore, it was decided to reduce the freight haulage capabilities of the InterCity 225, as traction for this sector was instead intended to be served via other platforms. The emergence of the Class 90, derived from the existing Class 87, somewhat reduced the pressure for the InterCity 225, reducing the prospective numbers to be built of the latter. Without tilting carriages, it had little speed advantage over the Class 90 on the WCML.

It was decided to hold a competitive tender for the InterCity 225 programme; this measure was aimed at avoiding the difficulties experienced with the APT programme. A pre-qualification document was formalised, in which various requirements for the type were laid out; these included the need to perform mixed-traffic duties (day and night passenger, parcel and mail, and overnight heavy freight services), the haulage of both tilting and conventional rolling stock, a top speed of 225 km/h (140 mph), a maximum cant deficiency of 9° without the provision of tilt equipment, and that the maximum unsprung mass could not exceed 1.8 tonnes. Furthermore, BR stated its readiness to sub-contract with the successful bidder for the supply of technical information, advice and testing. The prequalification document was issued to BREL, Brush Traction and the General Electric Company (GEC), as well as the French firm Alsthom and Germany's Krauss Maffei. The inclusion of foreign manufacturers was in part due to the limited domestic experience with trainsets capable of such high top speeds. A total of three companies, ASEA, Brush Traction and GEC, submitted tenders for the design and construction of the Class 91 locomotive.

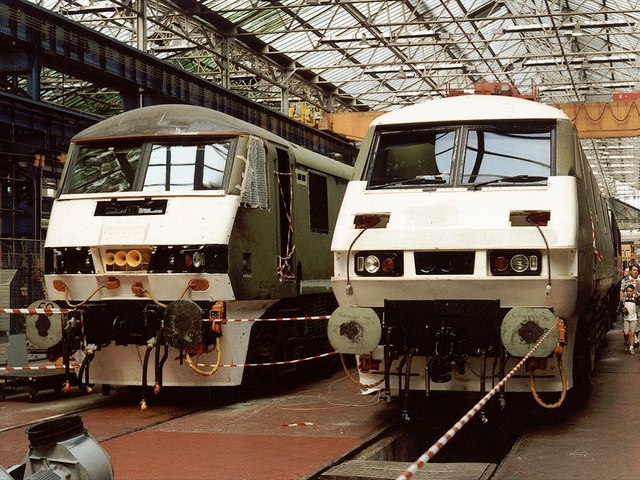
A Class 90 (90050) and a Class 91 (91020) under construction at Crewe Works in 1990

On 14 February 1985, the BR board approved the substitution of the Class 91 for Class 89 for the ECML programme. The tendering process was relatively complex, but a decisive move appeared to have been GEC's offer of a sub-contracting arrangement to BREL for the construction of the locomotive's mechanical elements. It would be GEC's submission that would be selected as the winner; after which a contract for the construction of 31 Class 91 locomotives, along with an option for 25 more for the WCML, was awarded during February 1986. Shortly thereafter, BREL established a production line for the type at its Crewe Works.

=== Post-introduction developments ===
The first passenger service to be operated by a Class 91 locomotive was the 17:36 King's Cross to Peterborough on 3 March 1989. From 6 March, members of the fleet began to work services between London and Grantham, and from 11 March services between London and Leeds. With the completion of the East Coast Main Line electrification programme, Class 91 trains reached Newcastle upon Tyne for the first time in service on 10 June 1991, then Edinburgh on 12 June.

In service, as a part of the InterCity 225 sets, the fleet worked alongside Class 90 locomotives and Class 317 electric multiple units. Diesel trains displaced by the Class 91 introduction were reallocated predominantly to the Midland Main Line. The InterCity 225's introduction correlated with a significant increase in passenger numbers using the ECML within two years; one station recorded a 58 per cent increase in passengers.

In the early 1990s, after the cancellation of InterCity 250, British Rail examined the option of ordering a further set of ten Class 91s to operate on the West Coast Main Line with UK Treasury support, however the business case for these failed to prove sufficiently worthwhile. and led to the electric Networker Classes 365, 465 and 466 EMU Networker stock's procurement being taken forward.

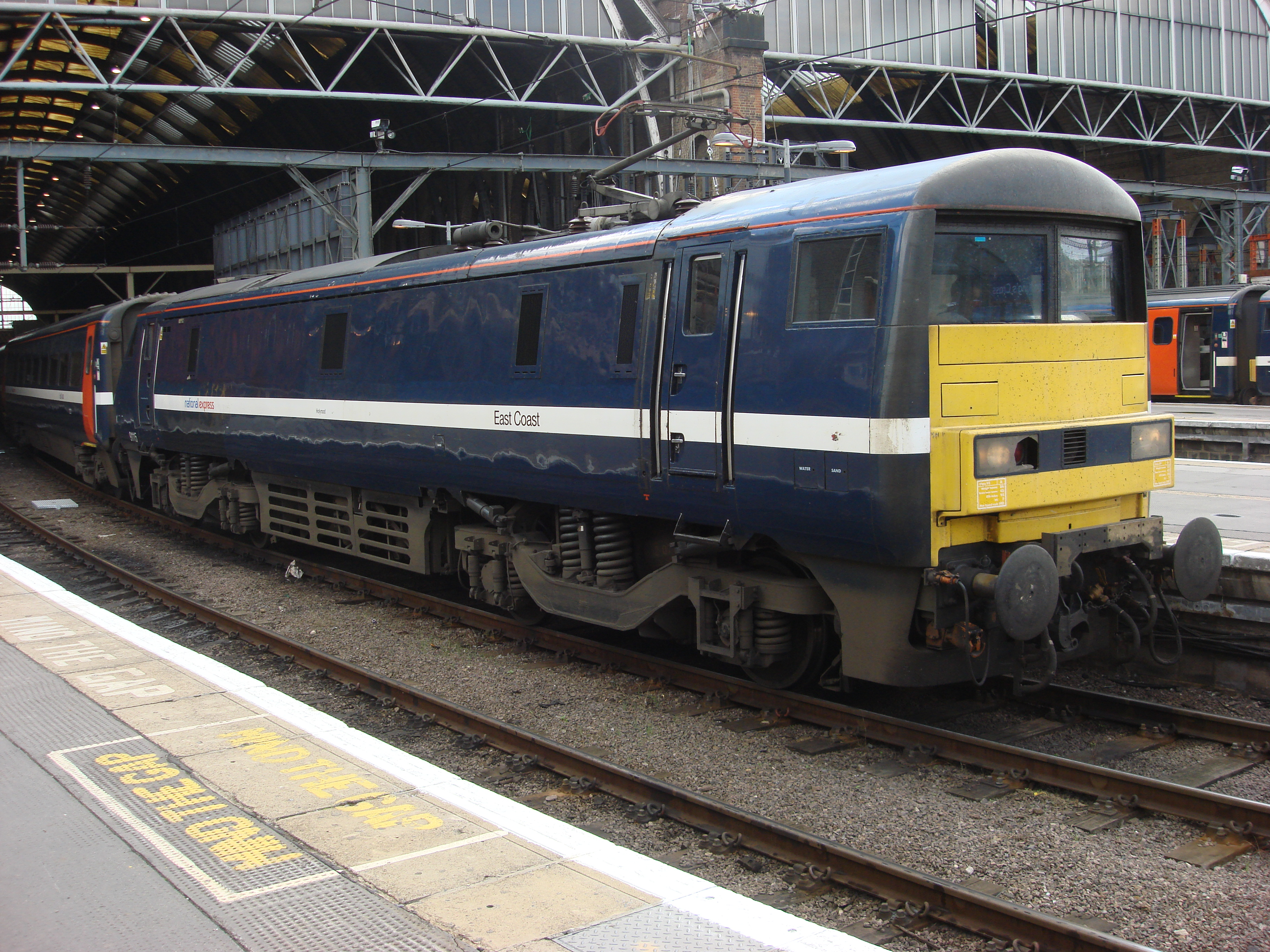
91115 running with the 'blunt' Number 2 end leading at London King's Cross

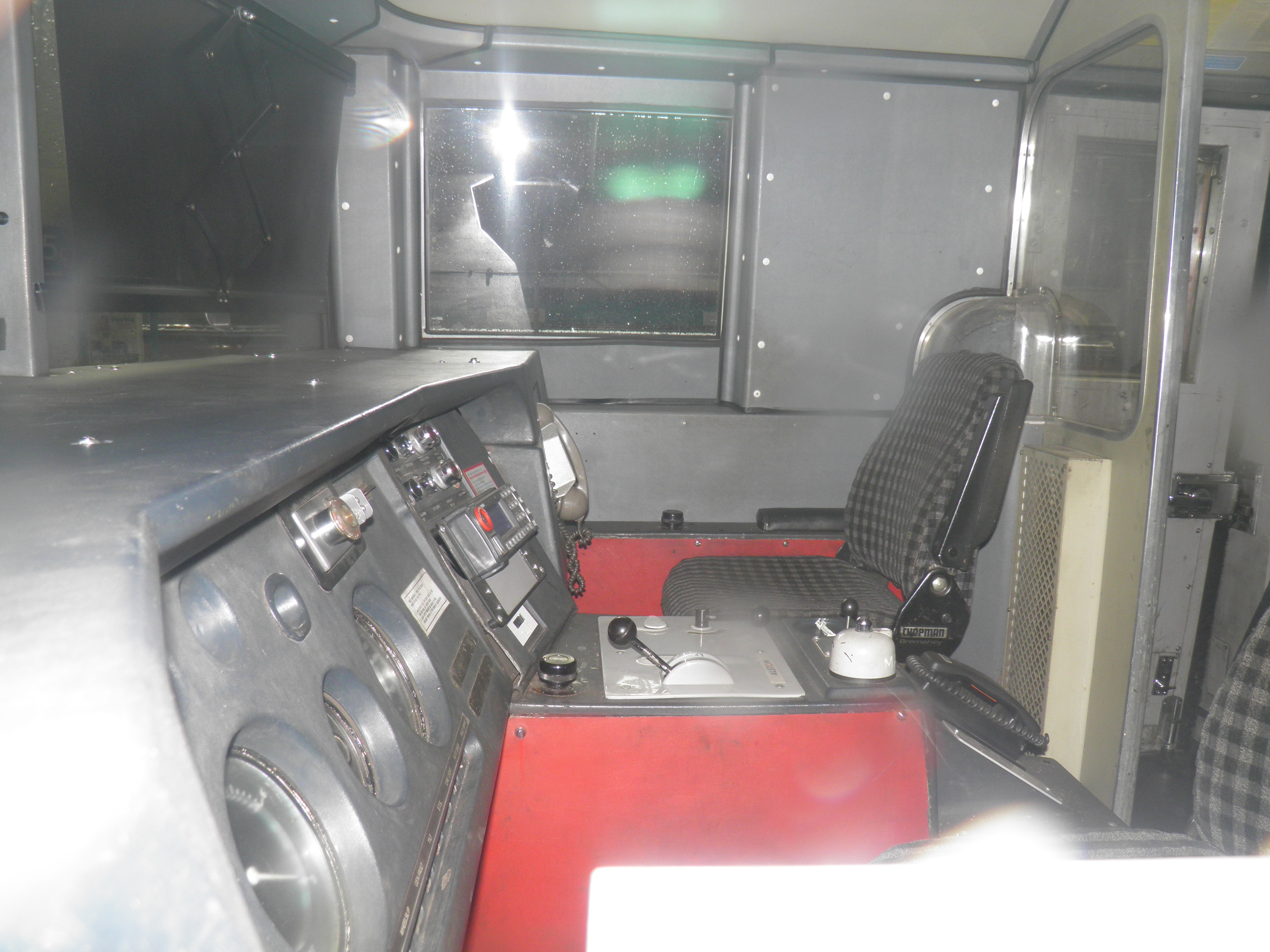
The No. 2 end driver's cab in a Class 91

The locomotive body is asymmetric; streamlined at the 'front' (Number 1) end to allow for high-speed operation, but left 'blunt' at the Number 2 end so as to visually blend with the fixed sets of Mark 4 coaches in normal push-pull passenger service. Because of a design requirement that the class be able to function as normal locomotives if so required, a full driver's cab is also provided at the Number 2 end – but the locomotive's maximum speed is reduced to 110 mph (180 km/h) when this cab is at the front of a train.

During the privatisation of British Rail ownership of the Class 91 fleet passed to Eversholt Rail Group, which in turn leased the fleet to its various operators. Eversholt put all 31 locomotives through a £30 million heavy overhaul and refit process (known as Project Delta) between 2000 and 2003, seeking to improve the fleet's reliability. Rail Magazine described it in March 2001 as being necessary because "eight out of ten failures on Class 91s were caused by the sub-standard electrics", and further noted that problems with relays in particular were the "third-biggest" cause of failures. The refit was performed by Adtranz (later Bombardier Transportation), with technical support from Alstom, and involved upgrades to the bogies, electrical systems, air compressors, and parking brakes; alterations to the cab layout at the Number 1 end; the replacement of the original gearboxes with newly designed Voith models; and the installation of TPWS and a new air-cooling system. Overhauled units had their numbers increased by 100; thus 91001 became 91101 and so on – with the exception of 91023, which was renumbered 91132 due to sensitivity around its involvement in both the Hatfield and Selby accidents.

During the overhaul process, GNER hired in Class 90 locomotives to provide cover for their services.

In November 2012, number 91114 had a second pantograph added as a pilot project conducted jointly by Eversholt, East Coast, DB ESG, Wabtec, and Brecknell Willis. The design uses the same mounting positions as a conventional pantograph but pairs two pantograph arms in an opposing configuration. If there is an ADD (Automatic Dropping Device) activation or the pantograph becomes detached, the train can keep going, so the system provides redundancy in the event of a pantograph/OLE failure.

=== Speed records ===
Locomotive 91010 (now 91110) holds the British speed record for electric locomotives, reaching 161.7 mph (260.2 km/h) while on a test run down the East Coast Main Line's Stoke Bank on 17 September 1989. Locomotive 91012 (now 91112) holds the separate record for the fastest non-stop journey between London King's Cross and Edinburgh Waverley; 3 hours 29 minutes on 26 September 1991, running within the 140 mph (230 km/h) speed limit but hauling a shortened set of only five coaches plus DVT. The time converts to an average speed of 112.5 mph (181.1 km/h).

Despite these successes, however, Class 91 locomotives have never used their 140 mph top speed in regular service, because testing conducted by British Rail in 1988 established that drivers could not interpret and act upon line-side signal aspects with sufficient consistency and accuracy when driving at speeds exceeding 125 mph (201 km/h). Regulations throughout Britain were subsequently amended to require the use of in-cab signalling whenever running service trains at speeds above 125 mph, an option that BR were unwilling to pursue at the time.

== Fleet ==
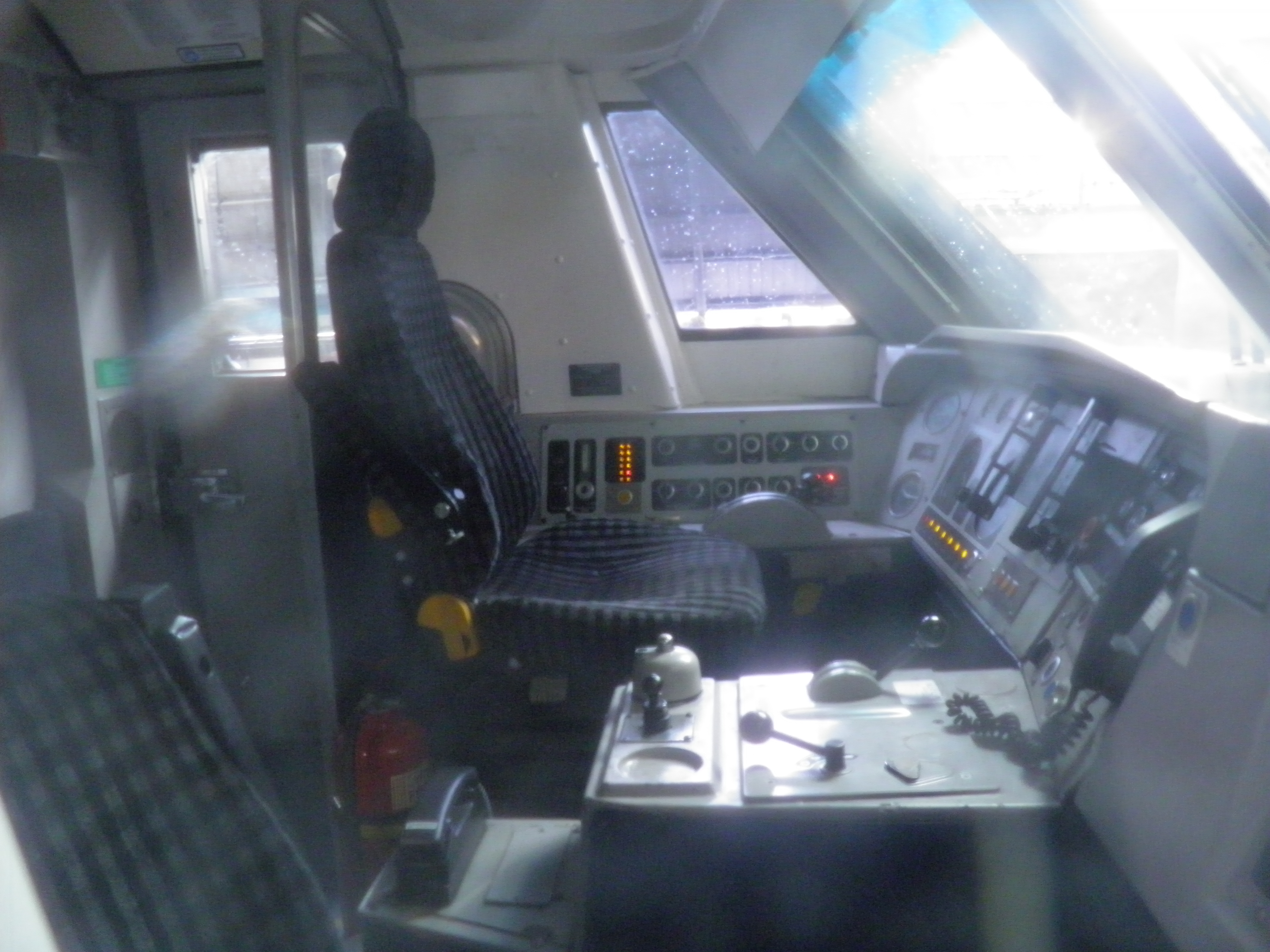
The main (Number 1 end) cab of a Class 91

When British Rail was privatised, the InterCity livery was progressively removed and new operator GNER applied their corporate livery of blue and vermilion. When GNER lost their franchise in 2007, the vermilion stripe was replaced by a white stripe containing the words National Express and East Coast. National Express East Coast originally planned to repaint all of their InterCity 225 sets in the white and silver NXEC corporate livery within two years. However, the collapse of NXEC in 2009 and its replacement with East Coast saw this repainting programme cancelled. As a result, 91111 was the only locomotive to receive the full National Express livery.

In June 2010, a new silver livery with a purple stripe was unveiled by East Coast. By February 2011, locomotives 91101, 91106, 91107 and 91109 carried this livery. Locomotive 91101 was soon given maroon vinyls, with Flying Scotsman branding. Locomotive 91107 was given promotional "Skyfall" vinyls for a time during 2012–3. The locomotive later returned to conventional Virgin Trains East Coast livery. Locomotive 91110 carries 'BBMF' Battle Of Britain Memorial Flight livery. By 2013, all locomotives carried the standard East Coast livery of silver/grey with a purple stripe. 91118 was the last locomotive to carry GNER/NXEC livery. All Mark 4 coaches and DVTs have since been repainted. On 14 October 2014, at Newcastle station, locomotive 91111 was unveiled in a commemorative World War I livery and named 'For The Fallen'.

The Class 91 fleet has carried nameplates applied in various batches and themes. Immediately after repainting into GNER colours in the late 1990s, all locomotives were briefly nameless. Having initially been applied to only a few locomotives in the early 1990s using cast-iron plates, eventually the whole fleet was named, many multiple times, until all were removed in 2008. In 2011, in response to customer requests, East Coast resumed the practice. It began by naming No. 91109 as Sir Bobby Robson with cast-iron plates, unveiled in a ceremony at Newcastle station on 29 March by his widow Elsie and Alan Shearer.

== List of Class 91 locomotives ==
Key:	In service	Stored	Scrapped	Preserved	Exported

Current Number	Previous Number(s)	Current name	Previous name(s)	Current livery	Built	Operator	Status	Notes								
Current Number	Previous Number(s)	Current name	Previous name(s)	Current livery	Built	Operator	Status	Notes	91101	91001	Flying Scotsman	City of London; Swallow	LNER InterCity	April 1988	LNER	Operational
91102	91002		City of York; Durham Cathedral		April 1988		Scrapped	Scrapped at Sims, Newport, May 2021.								
91103	91003		County of Lincolnshire, The Scotsman		April 1988		Scrapped	Arrived at C F Booth, Rotherham for scrapping, March 2022. Scrapped in August 2022.								
91104	91004		Grantham, The Red Arrows		June 1988		Scrapped	Arrived at C F Booth, Rotherham for scrapping, March 2022.								
91105	91005; 91000; 91150	National Railway Museum 50 Years 1975-2025	County Durham, Royal Air Force Regiment; Rail 1000	National Railway Museum 50th anniversary artwork	May 1988	LNER	Operational	Named in July 2025 and temporarily renumbered to 91150 to celebrate 50 years of National Railway Museum in York.								
91106	91006	Swallow InterCity 225 - Since 1989	East Lothian	LNER InterCity	June 1988	LNER	Operational	Named to celebrate LNER's first ‘225 Day’.								
91107	91007	Skyfall	Newark on Trent, Ian Allan	LNER InterCity	July 1988	LNER	Operational	Was temporarily renumbered back to 91007 for the duration of the Skyfall promotion.								
91108	91008		City of Leeds, Thomas Cook		July 1988		Scrapped	Went off lease in July 2019; first Class 91 locomotive to be withdrawn. Scrapped at C F Booth, Rotherham, May 2022.								
91109	91009	Sir Bobby Robson	The Samaritans, Saint Nicholas	LNER InterCity	August 1988	LNER	Operational									
91110	91010	Battle of Britain Memorial Flight	David Livingstone, Northern Rock	Battle of Britain Memorial Flight artwork	April 1989	LNER	Operational	The locomotive holds the national speed record for electric locomotives of 162.8 mph attained at Stoke Bank near Peterborough on 17 September 1989. Selected for preservation in the National Collection.								
91111	91011	For the Fallen	Terence Cuneo	For the Fallen artwork	February 1990	LNER	Operational	World War I commemoration. Selected for preservation in the National Collection.								
91112	91012		County of Cambridgeshire		April 1990		Scrapped	Hauled to Sims, Newport, on 3 February 2023								
91113	91013		County of North Yorkshire, Sir Michael Faraday		April 1990		Scrapped	Scrapped at Sims, Newport, May 2021.								
91114	91014	Durham Cathedral	St Mungo Cathedral, Northern Electric	LNER InterCity	May 1990	LNER	Operational	Previously fitted with experimental two-in-one pantograph. Renamed to Durham Cathedral and carried Lindisfarne Gospel artwork in 2013								
91115	91015		Blaydon Races; Holyrood		May 1990		Scrapped	Hauled to Sims, Newport, on 3 February 2023								
91116	91016		Strathclyde	LNER red/white	June 1990	LNER	Scrapped	Was in warm storage at Belmont Yard, Doncaster. Scrapped in February 2023.								
91117	91017	Project Electra	Cancer Research UK, City of Leeds, Commonwealth Institute, West Riding Limited	Europhoenix	July 1990	Europhoenix	Stored	Went off-lease on 25 September 2019. Was used as part of a test train called 'Projrct Electra' which tested the Kettering to Wigston overhead lines. Currently stored at Leicester L.I.P.								
91118	91018	The Fusiliers	Bradford Film Festival, Robert Louis Stevenson	LNER red/white	August 1990	LNER	Scrapped	Was in warm storage at Belmont Yard, Doncaster. Scrapped in February 2023.								
91119	91019	Bounds Green Intercity Depot	County of Tyne & Wear, Scottish Enterprise	BR InterCity 'Swallow'	August 1990	LNER	Operational									
91120	91020		Royal Armouries	BR Intercity 'Swallow'	October 1990	Europhoenix	Stored	On display at Crewe Heritage Centre on long-term loan from Europhoenix.								
91121	91021		Archbishop Thomas Cranmer, Royal Armouries	LNER red/white	October 1990	LNER	Scrapped.	Formerly carried pride decorations and was known as the "Trainbow". Was in warm storage at Belmont Yard, Doncaster. Scrapped in February 2023.								
91122	91022		Tam the Gun, Double Trigger, Robert Adley		October 1990		Scrapped	Used following withdrawal in testing of overhead wires on the Midland Main Line, scrapped in October 2022.								
91124	91024		Reverend W Awdry	LNER InterCity	September 1990	LNER	Operational									
91125	91025		Berwick upon Tweed, BBC Radio 1 FM		October 1990		Scrapped	Previously carried promotional livery for Sky 1 HD. Hauled to Sims, Newport, on 3 February 2023.								
91126	91026		Darlington Hippodrome; York Minster, Voice of the North		March 1991		Scrapped	Scrapped at Sims, Newport, May 2021.								
91127	91027	Neville Hill	Edinburgh Castle, Great North Run	LNER InterCity	December 1990	LNER	Operational	First locomotive in LNER InterCity livery.								
91128	91028		InterCity 50; Peterborough Cathedral, Guide Dog		January 1991		Scrapped	Used following withdrawal in testing of overhead wires on the Midland Main Line, scrapped in July 2022.								
91129	91029		Queen Elizabeth II		January 1991		Scrapped	Scrapped at Sims, Newport, May 2021.								
91130	91030	Lord Mayor of Newcastle	City of Newcastle, Palace of Holyroodhouse	LNER InterCity	March 1991	LNER	Operational									
91131	91031		County of Northumberland, Sir Henry Royce	LNER red/white	March 1991		Preserved	Last locomotive built at Crewe Works. Preserved at the Museum of Scottish Railways.								
91132	91023		City of Durham		September 1990		Scrapped	Involved in both Hatfield and Great Heck accidents. Renumbered 91132 (rather than 91123) after 2001 refurbishment. Scrapped at Sims, Beeston, March 2021.								

Table of withdrawals by year
Year	Quantity in service at start of year	Quantity withdrawn	Locomotives withdrawn
2019	31	4	91103, 91108, 91117, 91120
2020	27	15	91102, 91104, 91112–91113, 91115–91116, 91118, 91121–91122, 91125–91126, 91128–91129, 91131–91132

== Operators ==
Operator	Years	Livery	Image
British Rail (InterCity)	1988–1996	Intercity Swallow (red, white, and black)	
Great North Eastern Railway (GNER)	1996–2007	Navy blue with gold and vermilion detailing	91101 "City of London" at King's Cross in July 2007.
National Express East Coast	2007–2009	Interim livery (GNER navy blue with white stripe and National Express East Coast branding)	
National Express East Coast	2008–2009	National Express corporate grey and white (only used on 91111)	
East Coast	2009–2013	Interim livery (GNER navy blue with NXEC white stripe and East Coast branding)	
East Coast	2010–2012	Interim livery (NXEC grey/white with East Coast branding) (only used on 91111)	
East Coast	2010 - 2015	East Coast silver/grey with purple stripe	
Virgin Trains East Coast	2015–2016	Interim livery (East Coast silver with purple stripe and Virgin red stripe)	
Virgin Trains East Coast	2015–2018	Virgin Trains corporate red and white	91124 at York in April 2015.
London North Eastern Railway (LNER)	2018–2023	LNER red and white (VTEC red/white with LNER branding replacing the Virgin logo)	91125 at King's Cross in July 2018.
London North Eastern Railway (LNER)	2022–present	LNER InterCity 225 (red, white, and oxblood)	91130 at York railway station in October 2022
Europhoenix	2019–present	Europhoenix grey, silver, and red (with a phoenix motif branding)	91117 at Leicester TMD in October 2019.

Promotional / Non-Standard Liveries
Locomotive	Operator(s)	Years	Description	Image	Notes
91101	East Coast	2010–2015	Purple fading into the standard livery		Also applied to DVT 82205
91105	LNER	2025–present	Multi-coloured swirls and several of the NRM's locomotives including Mallard and Duchess of Hamilton		Unveiled at an event at the National Railway Museum on Tuesday, 8 July 2025. and remained on display on the turntable until Thursday, 10 July 2025.
91107	East Coast	2013	White livery featuring Daniel Craig as James Bond on the right side and the cast on the left side		Applied to DVT 82231 with Craig on the left and the cast on the right, and the coaches received matching '007' logos
91110	East Coast - LNER	2012–present	Features a Lancaster Bomber on the right side and a Spitfire and Hurricane on the left side		Unveiled at Railfest 2 June 2012 opposite 'Mallard', both being speed record holders Updated by LNER in 2022, replacing the East Coast purple stripe with a grey stripe in addition to the number being applied on the roof.
91111	East Coast - LNER	2014–present	Features silhouettes of soldiers and poppy fields on the sides and an inverted triangle warning panel on the front		Unveiled at Newcastle on October 14, followed by an event at Leeds on October 27 and a longer ceremony at King's Cross on November 7, 2014 Updated by LNER in 2022, replacing the East Coast purple stripe with a grey stripe
91114	East Coast, Virgin Trains East Coast	2013–2015	Standard livery with arches under purple line to represent Durham Viaduct and Lindisfarne Gospel artwork applied.		Locomotive renamed to Durham Cathedral on 3 July 2013 at Newcastle and blessed by The Reverend Stephen Sorby
91125	East Coast	2013	Promotional Sky 1 HD livery for 'All Aboard East Coast Trains'		Applied to coaches and DVT 82216, with the coaches featuring photos of the cast

=== Current operations ===
The fleet, which was previously operated by InterCity and then GNER, National Express East Coast, East Coast and Virgin Trains East Coast, is currently run by London North Eastern Railway (LNER).

In July 2019, 91108 was the first of the class to be withdrawn. Following the withdrawal of the InterCity 125 fleet in December 2019, it was previously thought that the InterCity 225 fleet would be fully withdrawn by June 2020. However, LNER announced on 29 January 2020 that they would be retaining a limited number of the InterCity 225 fleet to deliver all of the benefits of their December 2021 timetable. LNER later confirmed that they would be keeping 10 sets in service.

In September 2020, Eversholt Rail Group and LNER extended their lease to ten by 2023. In addition, there are options to make it operational until 2024. It will be overhauled at the Wabtec Doncaster plant.

At the end of service on 15 January 2021, the remaining serviceable InterCity 225 sets went into storage temporarily as part of the East Coast Upgrade. Originally, the plan was to return the sets to service for 7 June 2021, but instead the first set re-entered service on 11 May 2021 due to a number of Azuma sets having to be taken out of service.

In September 2024, as part of the Midland Main Line Electrification project, a test train called Project Electra was constructed utilising two Class 43s and 91117 which also received 'Project Electra' nameplates. The train was used to test 95 m (312 ft) of overhead lines between Kettering and Wigston to ensure they met Network Rail’s UKMS125 requirements. Locomotive 91117 received a modified HS-X pantograph, which is used on the Class 80X IEPs and had an operator in the cab in order to raise and lower the pantograph as needed. Hard-wired communication was fitted from the Class 43s to the 91 and to the monitoring equipment inside one of the coaches. The pantograph monitored the force exerted on the contact wire at various speeds up to the maximum of 125 mph.

In March 2026, LNER reintroduced the InterCity 225 services to Newcastle for the first time since 2020, having previously only running as far as York. The sets were reduced to seven carriages from nine as part of the December 2025 timetable update.

=== Future operations ===
Europhoenix purchased 91117 and 91120 in September 2019. They were repainted at Bounds Green TMD before moving to UK Rail Leasing's Leicester depot. They were to be re-geared for freight operation in Europe. In September 2022, 91120 moved to Crewe Heritage Centre on long-term loan from Europhoenix.

Rail Operations Group have taken a pair of Class 91s for use in testing of the newly electrified Midland Main Line prior to the introduction of regular electric services between Bedford and Corby. The company has also expressed interest in using the Class 91s on high speed logistics trains.

Grand Union proposed to operate InterCity 225s on London Paddington to Cardiff Central and London Euston to Stirling services.

== Scrapping ==
Locomotive 91132 was the first Class 91 to be scrapped, at Sims Metals scrapyard in Nottingham in 2021. A further 15 members of the class have also been scrapped as of 2026.

== Preservation ==
In March 2015, The Board of Trustees of the Science Museum announced that 91111 'For The Fallen' was designated to enter The National Collection (including the nameplates and livery it currently wears) at the end of the locomotive's working life. This is also believed to be the first time a livery has been designated too.

91110 has also been designated for The National Collection by the Railway Heritage Designation Advisory Board once it is withdrawn from traffic

In September 2022, Crewe Heritage Centre received 91120 on long-term loan from Europhoenix.

Locomotive 91131 was nominated by the Railway Heritage Committee in 2011 to be preserved upon its retirement; in March 2023, it moved to preservation at the Museum of Scottish Railways at the Bo'ness and Kinneil Railway.

In February 2026, 225 Preservation was launched, announcing they had preserved two British Rail Mark 4 Carriages which had previously run with Class 91s in service. These are both LNER ‘Oxblood’ coach ‘M’s which were taken out of the sets as part of the December 2025 timetable. They have expressed a desire to own and operate a Class 91 and hope this is a stepping stone towards it.
