= Virgin Trains East Coast =

Former British train operating company

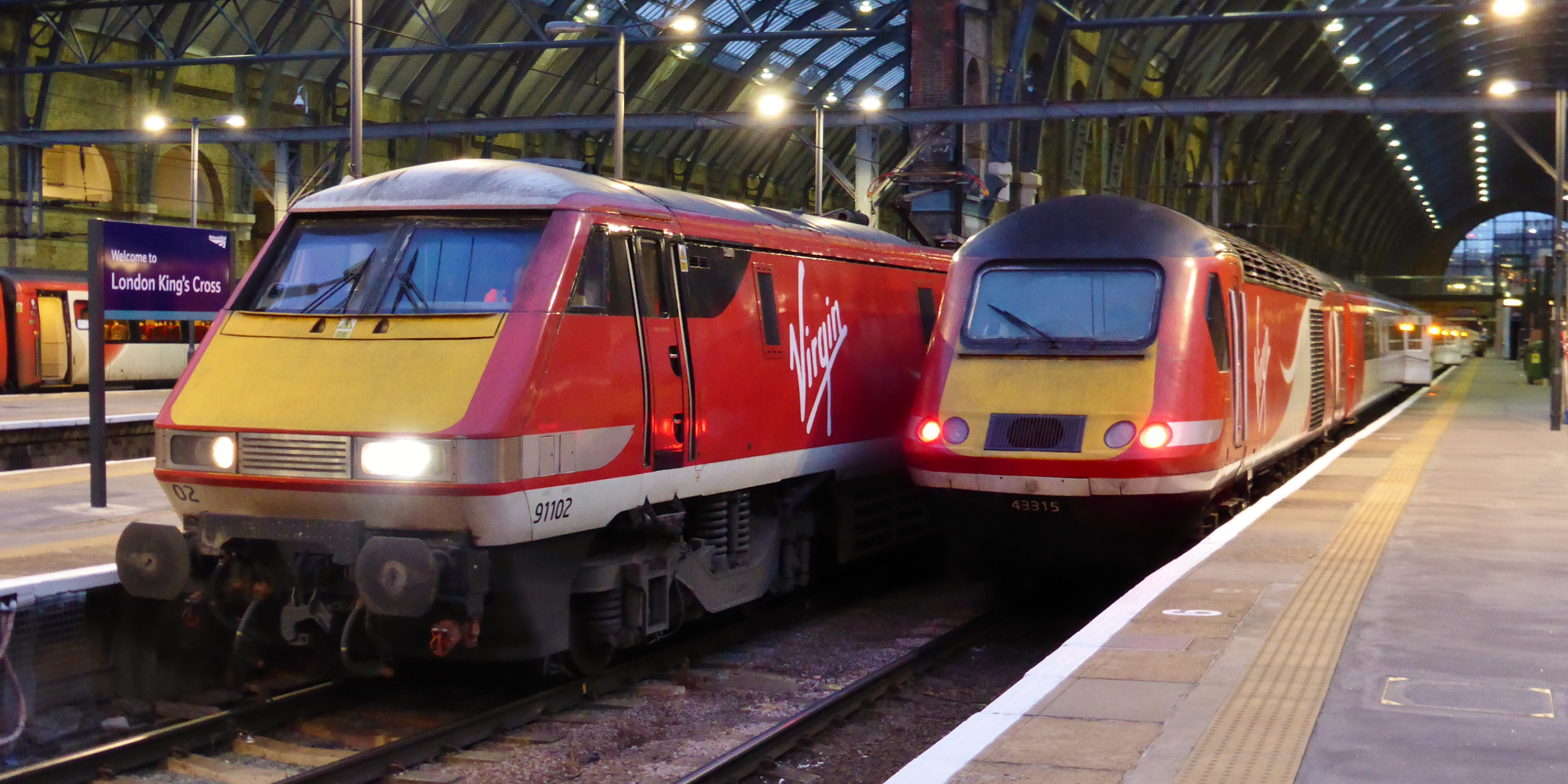
- InterCity 225 and HST at London King's Cross in May 2017

Overview
- Franchises: InterCity East Coast; 1 March 2015 – 23 June 2018
- Main routes: London–Aberdeen; London–Edinburgh; London–Newcastle; London–York; London–Leeds; London–Newark
- Other routes: Leeds–Aberdeen; London–Inverness; London–Glasgow; London–Sunderland; London–Skipton; London–Bradford; London–Harrogate; London–Hull; London–Lincoln
- Fleet: 31 InterCity 225 sets; 14 InterCity 125 sets
- Stations called at: 53
- Stations operated: 12
- Parent company: Stagecoach Group (90%); Virgin Group (10%)
- Reporting mark: GR
- Predecessor: East Coast
- Successor: London North Eastern Railway

Other
- Website: www.lner.co.uk
Route map
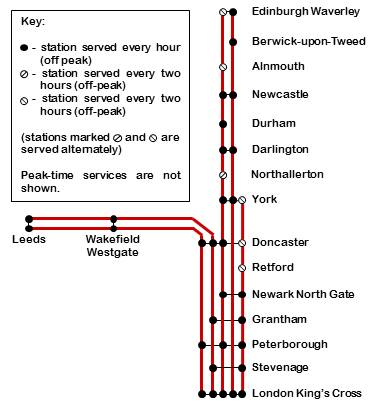

Virgin Trains East Coast (VTEC) (legal name East Coast Main Line Company Limited) was a British train operating company that operated the InterCity East Coast franchise on the East Coast Main Line between London, Yorkshire, the North East and Scotland. It commenced operations on 1 March 2015, taking over from East Coast as a joint venture between Stagecoach (90%) and Virgin Group (10%).

It was originally intended to run until 2023 and return £3.3 billion to the government in the form of franchise premiums, but, due to the line performing below VTEC's expectations, it was announced in May 2018 that the contract would be terminated early by the government; VTEC ceased operating on 23 June 2018, when operations passed to the state-owned operator London North Eastern Railway.

While the operation itself was profitable, VTEC placed part of the blame for the under-performance with respect to their franchise bid on their belief that the government had failed to deliver expected upgrades or new trains, while the government claimed VTEC had simply overbid. Given it was the third instance of the East Coast franchise needing to be terminated early for financial reasons, it was announced the next permanent arrangement, to begin in 2020, would feature closer co-operation between the private sector and Network Rail, the state-owned operator of the infrastructure.

== History ==
=== Award ===
In January 2014, FirstGroup, Keolis/Eurostar and Stagecoach/Virgin were announced by the Department for Transport (DfT) as the shortlisted bidders for the new InterCity East Coast franchise. In November 2014, the eight-year franchise was awarded to the Stagecoach/Virgin joint venture and commenced operating on 1 March 2015 trading as Virgin Trains East Coast.

=== Financial problems ===
On 28 June 2017, Stagecoach announced passenger revenues on the East Coast line were below expectations, meaning the company had registered a loss of around £200m to date, due to the profits that were being registered being lower than the payments due to the government for the right to operate the franchise. As a result, Stagecoach were attempting to renegotiate the terms, a process that was being delayed by the intervening general election. They made a loss when trades were down 11% due to loss on the East Coast service. The RMT called for renationalisation of the franchise, although Stagecoach was confident it could make a profit within two years.

In November 2017, the Transport Secretary Chris Grayling announced that the franchise would be terminated three years early in 2020, and in its place would be the East Coast Partnership (ECP), the first of a new type of franchising arrangement, a long term regional public-private partnership where the private entity takes more control over the Network Rail infrastructure, under a "unified brand". The House of Commons Transport Committee described the partnership approach in 2018 as "experimental" and in need of a proper feasibility assessment. Stagecoach claimed that the failure of Network Rail to implement expected infrastructure improvements, and delays to the government-controlled purchase of the fleet of Azuma trains, were partly responsible for the expected growth in passenger revenue failing to materialise. Grayling however claimed that Stagecoach had simply made a mistake in their bid calculations, while admitting that the tender process encouraged over-bidding. Critics of the early termination described it as yet another government bailout of a private company in the failed privatised railway system, although this was only based on the fact the government would lose the more than £2 billion in future franchise payments due to the government over the last four years of its contract. Analysts claimed that since both parties shared blame for the losses, an early termination was mutually desirable. Both Stagecoach and the Secretary of State anticipated all contractual payments due would be fulfilled up to the termination date, and since the Secretary had been advised there had been no malpractice or malicious intent on their part, Stagecoach and Virgin would be free to bid for future franchises, including the ECP.

=== Demise ===
In February 2018, with the situation now seen as more urgent, the date for the end of VTEC's contract was brought forwards to "a small number of months", with the Secretary considering replacing it with either a short term not for profit arrangement with VTEC, or renationalisation under an operator of last resort, until the ECP could begin in 2020. On 16 May 2018 it was announced that the London North Eastern Railway, a temporary government controlled operator of last resort, would take over the operation of the line from 24 June 2018, thus ending VTEC's contract.

== Services ==
Typical off-peak Monday-Friday service pattern (including other inter-city services)

Virgin Trains East Coast took over all of the services operated by East Coast. It categorised its weekday services from London King's Cross into four routes:

	Route	Off-peak frequency	Calling at (off-peak)	Peak-time extensions
A	London King's Cross to Leeds (and West Yorkshire)	2tph	1tph: Peterborough, Doncaster, Wakefield Westgate; 1tph: Stevenage, Grantham, Doncaster, Wakefield Westgate	1tpd to Skipton via Keighley; 1tpd to Bradford Forster Square via Shipley; 1tpd to Harrogate via Horsforth
B	London King's Cross to Edinburgh (express)	1tph	York, Darlington, Newcastle, Berwick-upon-Tweed	1tpd to Inverness; 1tpd to Stirling; 4tpd to Aberdeen (3 from London King's Cross, 1 from Leeds)
C	London King's Cross to Edinburgh (semi-fast)	1tph	Peterborough, Newark North Gate, Doncaster, York, Northallerton (1tp2h), Darlington, Durham, Newcastle, Alnmouth (1tp2h) (Northallerton and Alnmouth are usually served by alternate trains)	1tpd to Glasgow Central; 1tpd to Sunderland
D	London King's Cross to Newark North Gate (and York)	1tph	Stevenage, Peterborough, Grantham; 1tp2h extended to York calling at Retford and Doncaster	1tpd to Lincoln; 1tpd to Hull

=== Named Services ===
Virgin Trains East Coast operated a number of named passenger trains, including:

Name	Origin	Destination	Other details
Flying Scotsman	London King's Cross	Edinburgh Waverley	Service began 1862 in both directions; named by the LNER in 1924, today only operates in southbound direction
Highland Chieftain	London King's Cross	Inverness	the longest VTEC route
Northern Lights	London King's Cross	Aberdeen	

=== Service changes ===
Virgin Trains East Coast introduced once per day services to Stirling and Sunderland via Newcastle on 14 December 2015, along with one extra service each weekday evening between Hull and Doncaster via Selby. In May 2016, a number of weekday services to Newcastle were extended to Edinburgh meaning there was almost a complete half hourly service between the two cities. From December 2016, Morpeth benefited from additional stops provided by the operator to improve connections to Edinburgh and London.

Following the December 2017 timetable change, VTEC introduced 24 new Saturday services, increasing the number of Saturday services to 151, only six fewer than weekdays. A weekday service from York at 4:40 am arriving in London for 7 am was also introduced.

== Rolling stock ==
Virgin Trains East Coast inherited the rolling stock operated by East Coast, comprising InterCity 125 High Speed Train sets made up of Class 43 power cars and Mark 3 carriages, and InterCity 225 sets made up of Class 91 electric locomotives and Mark 4 carriages and Driving Van Trailers. Most driving vehicles received a Virgin logo within the first three days of the franchise, and all train sets had received the full red and white VTEC livery by November 2015.

Attention then turned to the interiors, with toilets to be refreshed and seat covers and carpets replaced. The first refurbished set entered service on 31 December 2015. All of the HST sets were refurbished by August 2016, and all of the InterCity 225 sets by January 2017.

In July 2015, an additional HST set was transferred from East Midlands Trains.

=== Fleet at end of franchise ===
Class	Image	Type	Top speed		Number	Built	Notes
Class	Image	Type	mph	km/h	Number	Built	Notes
InterCity 125 trains (HSTs)
Class 43		Diesel locomotive	125	200	32	1976–1982	
Mark 3 carriage		Passenger carriage	125	200	117	1975–1988	
InterCity 225 trains
Class 91		Electric locomotive	140	225	31	1988–1991	
Mark 4 carriage		Passenger carriage	140	225	302	1989–1992	
Driving Van Trailer		Control car	140	225	31	1988	
Hired locomotives
Class 90		Electric locomotive	110	177	3	1987–1990	A short term hire-in to cover for a shortfall in Class 91s.

=== Intercity Express Programme ===
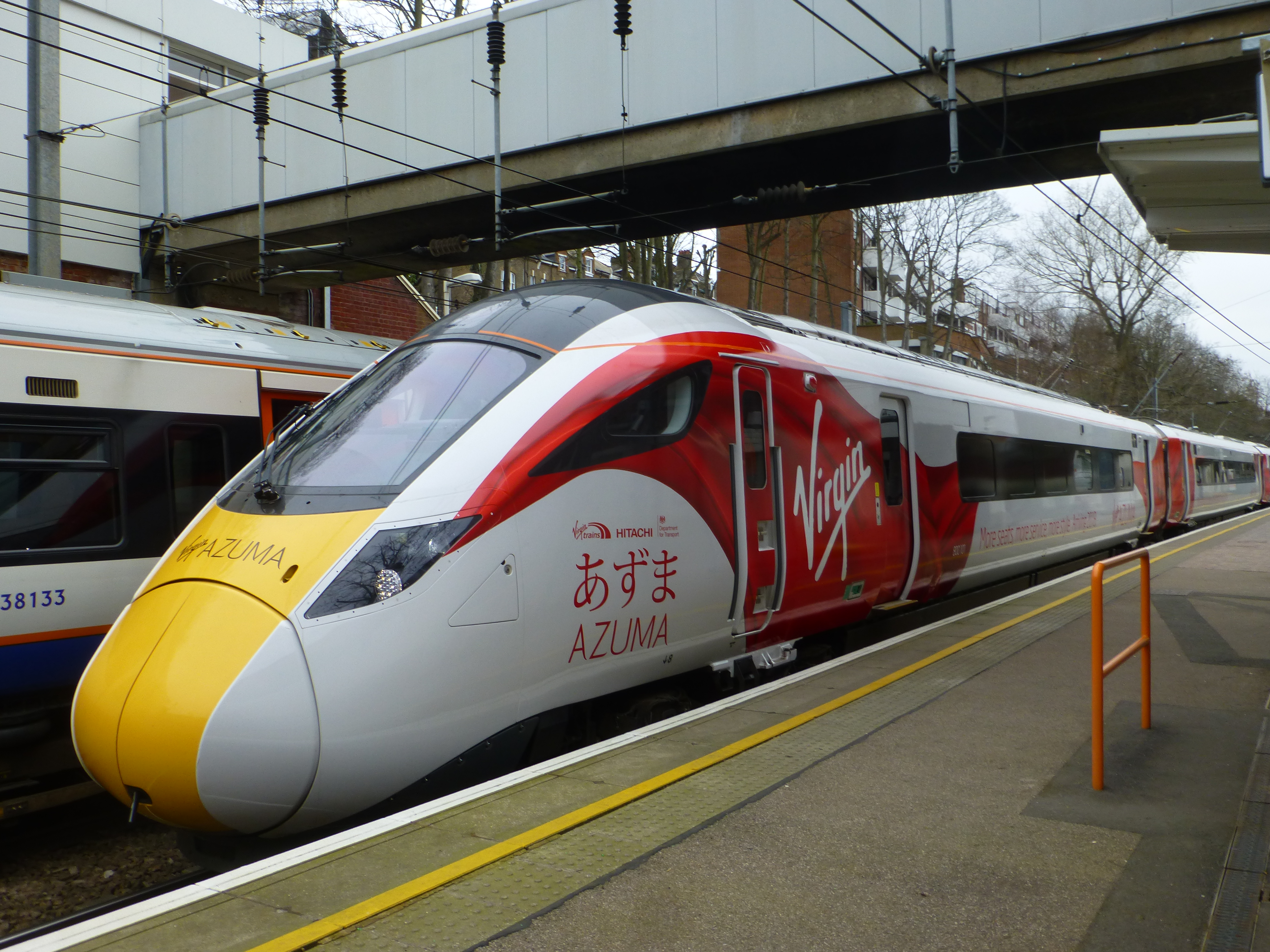
Class 800 in Virgin Trains East Coast livery

Although Virgin Trains East Coast had no plans of its own to introduce new rolling stock, 10 five-car and 13 nine-car Class 800 bi-mode trains and 12 five-car and 30 nine-car Class 801 EMUs were due to be introduced during VTEC's franchise term as part of the DfT-led Intercity Express Programme. On 16 March 2016, VTEC officially unveiled the first of the new trains and branded them as Azuma, after the native Japanese term for "east". In October 2017, it was revealed that the fleet would enter service from December 2018, but the early termination of the franchise in June 2018 meant that they were not used in service under VTEC. The trains were finally introduced in May 2019 under London North Eastern Railway, retaining the Azuma branding.

== Depots ==
Virgin Trains East Coast had four main depots:

- Bounds Green TMD, London
- Neville Hill TMD, Leeds
- Heaton TMD, Newcastle – managed by Arriva Rail North
- Craigentinny TMD, Edinburgh – for repaints and heavy duty maintenance

== Operation ==
=== Punctuality ===
The public performance measure (PPM) shows the percentage of trains which arrive at their terminating station on time. It combines figures for punctuality and reliability into a single performance measure. The most recent figure (in the four weeks from 13 December 2015 – 9 January 2016) for Virgin Trains East Coast's PPM was 82.0%. The moving annual average PPM was 86.9%.

=== Passenger numbers ===
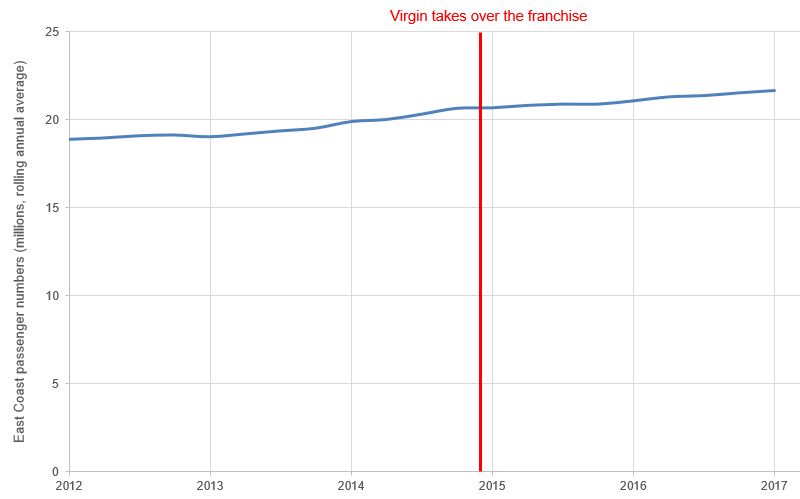
East Coast passenger numbers in the previous year from 2011 to 2017.

=== Profitability ===
During the tender process, Virgin Trains East Coast promised to pay higher premiums to the government than its predecessor East Coast did, but failed comprehensively, immediately reducing premium payments and eventually giving up its £3.3 billion franchise.

In the first full year of operation, the company repaid only £204 million of the premium, shortly before defaulting on the franchise. This compares unfavorably to the £235 million paid over the previous year by the publicly operated East Coast franchise.

=== Incident with Jeremy Corbyn ===
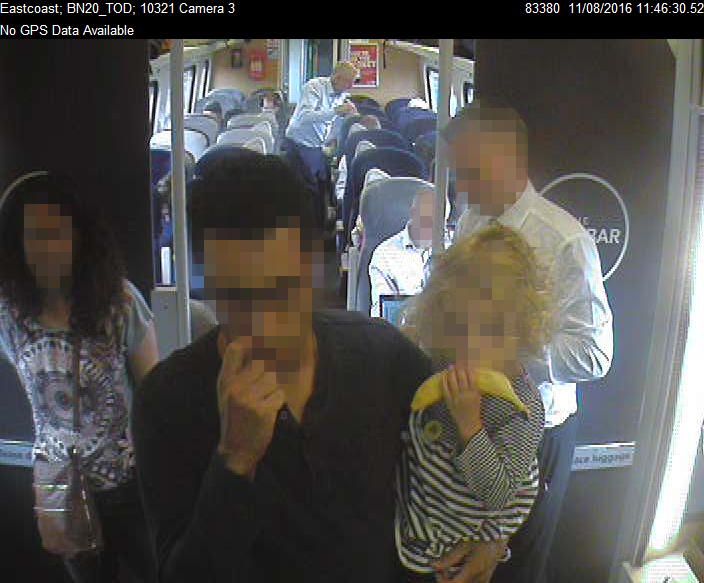
According to VTEC: "CCTV footage shows Mr Corbyn returning to Coach H and sitting down at 11.43am, shortly after being filmed while sitting on the floor and more than 2hrs before his final destination, Newcastle."

In August 2016, a video was released of Labour Party leader Jeremy Corbyn in which he said he was forced to sit on the floor on a VTEC train to Newcastle because the train was "ram-packed". At the time, Corbyn said "Is it fair that I should upgrade my ticket whilst others who might not be able to afford such a luxury should have to sit on the floor? It's their money I would be spending after all.” However, Virgin Trains later released edited CCTV footage which they claimed showed Corbyn walking past empty seats in Coach H, filming the video and then walking back to Coach H to sit for the rest of the journey. Corbyn said about the incident "Yes, I did walk through the train. Yes, I did look for two empty seats together so I could sit down with my wife, to talk to her. That wasn't possible so I went to the end of the train." Analysis by a media outlet supporting the re-election bid of Jeremy Corbyn in the then-Labour leadership contest of the CCTV footage later claimed to show that the unreserved seats in some of the images were occupied and that other passengers also sat in the vestibules.

=== Industrial action ===
Due to concerns over the planned introduction of driver-only operation by VTEC, in addition to nearly 200 planned compulsory redundancies and staff pay concerns, the National Union of Rail, Maritime and Transport Workers (RMT) announced that three 24-hour strikes would be held by all workers (except depot maintenance workers) at VTEC in August 2016; however, following negotiations between VTEC and the RMT, these were all eventually cancelled.

A further breakdown in negotiations between the RMT and VTEC resulted in the union calling for further industrial action, which took place for 24 hours on 3 October 2016. Further strikes were subsequently called, for 48 hours on 28–29 April 2017; however, this was again cancelled before it could take place following "progress" in talks between the union and the operator.

Preceded by East Coast	Operator of InterCity East Coast franchise 2015–2018	Succeeded by London North Eastern Railway
