= Stoke Bank =

Stretch of the East Coast Main Line railroad in England

Coordinates: 52.841973°N 0.584054°W

Stoke Bank is an inclined stretch of the East Coast Main Line (ECML) between Peterborough and Grantham. It is named after the village of Stoke Rochford, close to Stoke Summit, which at 345 feet (105 m) above sea level is the highest point of the ECML between London King's Cross and Berwick-upon-Tweed. It is not however, the highest point of the entire ECML, which is Grantshouse Summit between Berwick and Edinburgh at 400 feet (120 m).

The climb up the bank begins roughly 15 miles (24 km) north of Peterborough, which is close to sea level, and ascends to Stoke Summit over a distance of approximately 10 miles (16 km) with gradients of up to 1 in 178 (0.56%). Shortly after the summit, the line runs through the 880 yards (800 m) Stoke Tunnel. It then descends for around 5 miles at 1 in 200 (0.5%) before reaching Grantham station, and then continues on a more gradual descent for around 15 miles, until reaching Newark North Gate, which is also near sea level.

== Speed records ==
Stoke Bank is most famous for being the scene of a number of high speed runs by various trains. Most famously, 4468 Mallard broke the world speed record for a steam locomotive of 126 miles per hour (203 km/h) on 3 July 1938. In July 1998, a trackside sign was erected at the 90 1/4 mark milepost to commemorate the record.

On 5 March 1935, the LNER Class A3 2750 Papyrus steam locomotive set a record-breaking speed of 108 miles per hour (174 km/h) while descending Stoke Bank. During this historic run, Papyrus maintained an average speed of 100.6 miles per hour (161.9 km/h) over 12 miles (19 km), demonstrating the remarkable capabilities of non-streamlined steam engines. This achievement briefly made Papyrus the fastest steam locomotive in Britain and cemented its legacy as the fastest non-streamlined steam locomotive in British history, a title it retains to this day.

On 23 May 1959, 60007 Sir Nigel Gresley set the post-war steam record speed of 112 miles per hour (180 km/h). As with Mallard's record, this was descending southward from Stoke Bank, but unlike Mallard's run, which was a special attempt, this was with a full train of passengers returning from an excursion to Doncaster Works.

On 2 February 1978, the fastest speed achieved by a Class 55 "Deltic" diesel locomotive was attained by 55 008 The Green Howards, which was on a special record-breaking run, hauling 10 coaches (343 tons gross). The train achieved a speed of 125 miles per hour (201 km/h) whilst descending Stoke Bank.

On 17 September 1989 the British speed record for an electric locomotive was achieved on Stoke Bank, by a Class 91 (91 110, formerly 91 010) which reached 161.7 miles per hour (260.2 km/h).
