= British Rail Class 90 =

British class of electric locomotives

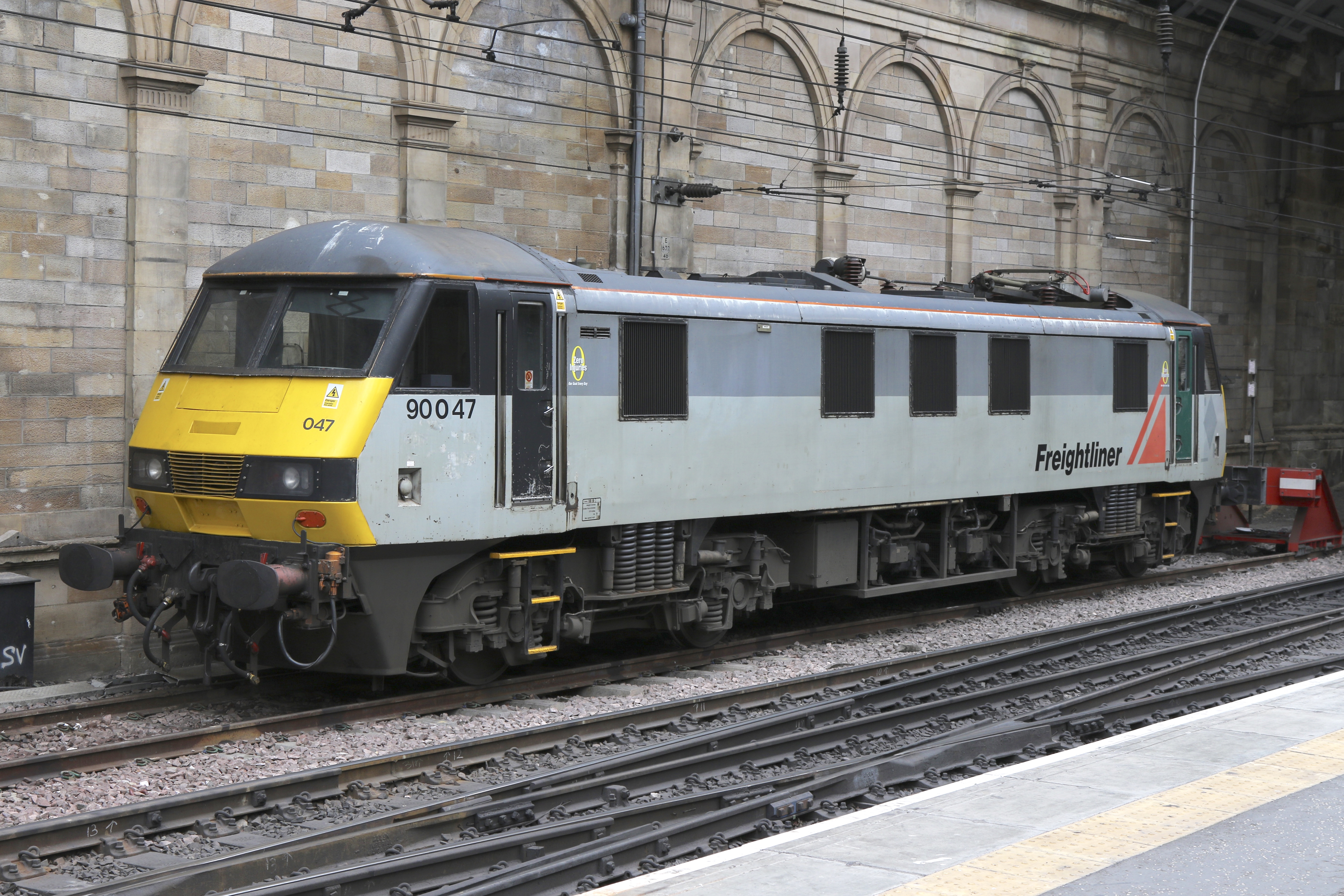
- Freightliner Class 90 at Edinburgh Waverley in 2016
Type and origin
- Power type: Electric
- Builder: British Rail Engineering Limited, Crewe Works
- Build date: 1987–1990
- Total produced: 50
Specifications
- Configuration
  - AAR: B-B
  - UIC: Bo′Bo′
  - Commonwealth: Bo-Bo
- Gauge: 4 ft 8 1/2 in (1,435 mm) standard gauge
- Wheel diameter: 3 ft 9 1/2 in (1.156 m)
- Minimum curve: 80 m (4 chains)
- Wheelbase: 43 ft 6 in (13.26 m)
  - Bogie: 10 ft 9 in (3.28 m)
- Pivot centres: 32 ft 9 in (9.98 m)
- Length: 61 ft 6 in (18.75 m)
- Width: 9 ft (2.7 m)
- Height
  - Pantograph: 13 ft 0 1/4 in (3.969 m)
- Loco weight: 84.5 tonnes (83.2 long tons; 93.1 short tons)
- Electric system/s: 25 kV AC Catenary
- Current pickup: Brecknell Willis high speed pantograph
- Traction motors: 1,250 hp (930 kW); 4 × GEC 412 BZ; 4 × GEC G-412CY
- Gear ratio: 32:73
- MU working: TDM system
- Train heating: Electric Train Heating index: 95
- Loco brake: Air, Rheostatic
- Train brakes: Air
Performance figures
- Maximum speed: 110 mph (177 km/h)
- Power output
  - Continuous: 5,000 hp (3,730 kW)
- Tractive effort: 58,000 lbf (258 kN)
- Brakeforce: 40 tons
Career
- Operators: British Rail, DB Cargo UK, Freightliner
- Numbers: 90001–90050
- Nicknames: Skoda
- Axle load class: Route availability 7
- Withdrawn: 2004–present
- Disposition: 25 in service, 19 stored, 6 scrapped

The British Rail Class 90 is a type of electric locomotive built for mixed-traffic duties, operating from 25 kV AC overhead lines and producing 5,000 bhp (3,700 kW). It weighs 84.5 tonnes and can typically achieve a top speed of 110 mph (177 km/h).

The Class 90 is a modernised derivative of the preceding Class 87 locomotive, having been originally designated as the Class 87/2. During the 1980s, British Rail Engineering Limited (BREL) had submitted an offer to build 25 examples to replace various aging electric locomotives, including Classes 81, 82, 83, 84 and 85. It was selected over numerous rival proposals, including the InterCity 225 and the Class 89; the type was manufactured by BREL at Crewe Works between 1987 and 1990.

The Class 90 was introduced to service during the closing years of British Rail, being used for both passenger services and freight trains alike. Following the privatisation of British Rail, the type has served with several operators, including Abellio Greater Anglia, Virgin Trains West Coast and Great North Eastern Railway (GNER); it was, however, displaced largely from regular passenger services during the 2000s and 2010s. Currently, Class 90 locomotives are employed on heavy freight trains and occasional charter services.

== History ==
The origins of the Class 90 can be traced back to various schemes performed by British Rail (BR) during the 1970s and 1980s. Several events had led to a significant nationwide shortage of electric traction; these included the electrification of the East Coast Main Line (ECML) and the cancelled procurement of the Advanced Passenger Train (APT), which had been intended to be the next major inter-city express train. Several different initiatives were launched during this era to alleviate this shortage, including an electrified version of the InterCity 125 (known as the HST-E), the Class 89 mixed-traffic locomotive and what would become the InterCity 225.

While BR's board had approved the ordering of a single Class 89 for demonstration purposes, the Strategy Committee queried why the locomotive had been favoured over a proposed 80-tonne Bo-Bo locomotive. At this time, the Class 89 had been allegedly thought to be a low-risk option for multi-purpose operations, but offered little in the way of performance advantages over the existing Class 87. It was clear that additional electric locomotives were necessary no matter what, as both the 1950s-era Classes 81 and 85 electric locomotives were nearing the end of their viable service lives and had become quite unreliable. The InterCity 225 had been intended to address this need for multi-purpose traction; the prequalification document included a requirement for it to perform mixed-traffic duties, including day and night passenger duties, parcel/mail traffic, and overnight heavy freight services. Appraisals had also determined that the Class 89 was comparatively inferior in financial terms to the InterCity 225, which decreased the likelihood of the former ever attaining quantity production.

While it was intended for the InterCity 225 to be ubiquitous, even potentially having the capability built into it to operate over the southern third-rail network and within the Channel Tunnel, such fanciful ideas had been curtailed by mid-1984. BR officials opted to deprioritise the freight haulage capabilities of the InterCity 225; instead, they planned to meet the outstanding traction needs for the sector via other platforms. The Class 87 locomotive, having been introduced a decade earlier, had proven itself capable; thus there was considerable interest procuring additional units as a low-cost option with virtually no risk for the West Coast Main Line (WCML). BREL issued its submission to produce an initial batch of 25 Class 87/2s (the original designation for the Class 90), which quickly received a favourable reception.

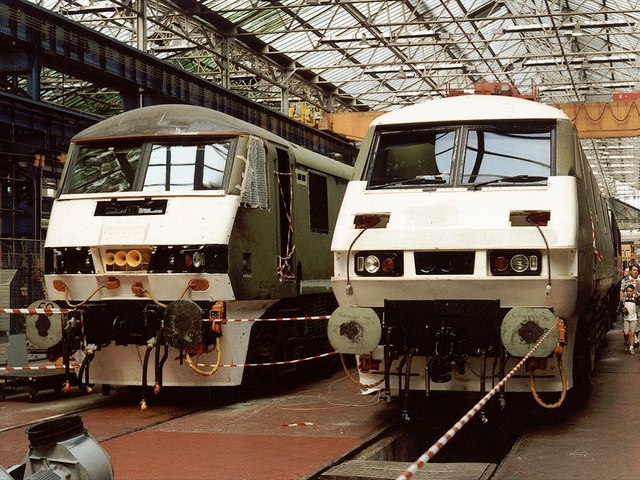
A Class 90 and a Class 91 under construction at Crewe Works in 1990

BR's board decided that it would curtail its plans to source the InterCity 225 for the WCML and instead procure the Class 87/2 to haul its intended traffic. As result, the freight business refused to finance a planned upgrade to InterCity 225's traction equipment, which would have given the former an equal haulage capability to the Class 87/2. Further studies determined that, when hauling passenger consists, the Class 87/2 had no disadvantage against the InterCity 225 on the WCML, unless the latter was outfitted with tilting coaches; both the Class 87/2 and the InterCity 225's Class 91 locomotive had been specified to possess at least 5,000 horsepower (3,700 kW). Accordingly, the procurement of the Class 90 was assured, while no InterCity 225s would be sourced for the WCML.

A total of fifty Class 90 locomotives were manufactured by BREL at Crewe Works between 1985 and 1990; these were numbered 90001-050.

== Description ==
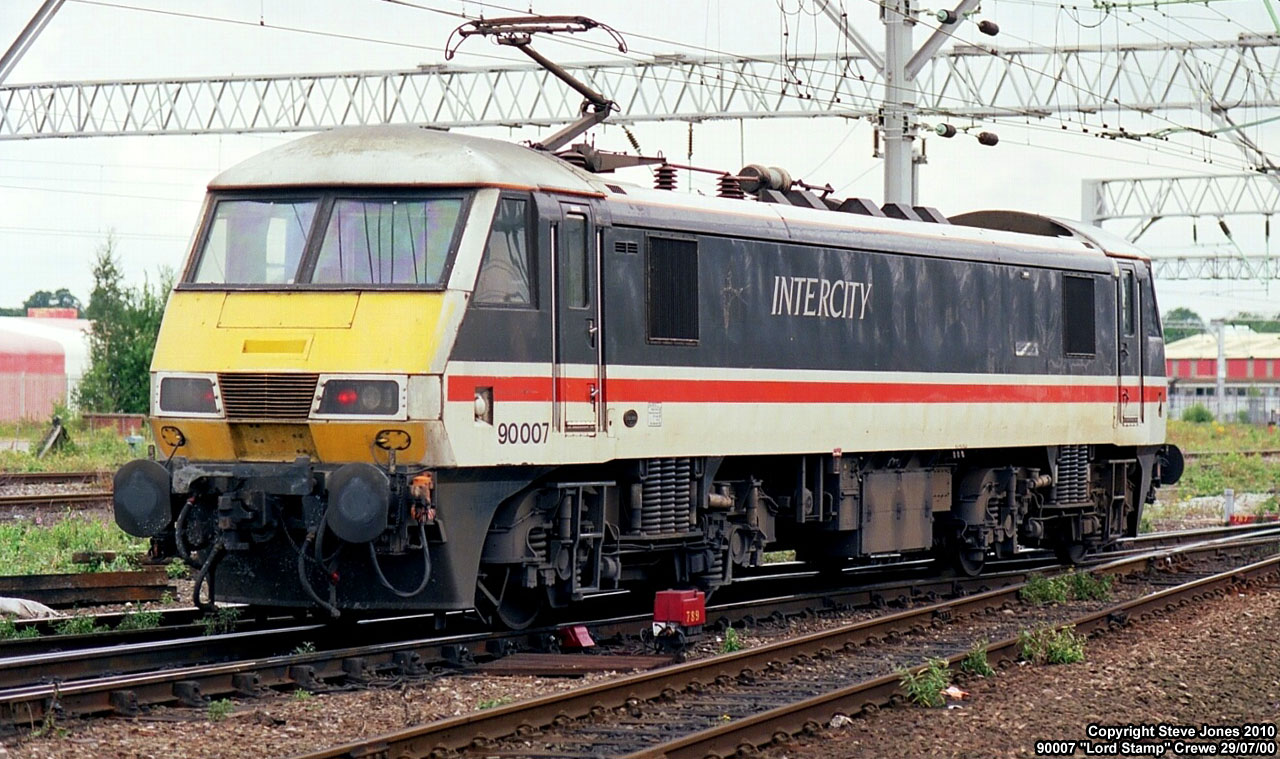
Class 90 in InterCity Swallow livery in 2000

The design of the Class 90 is heavily derived from the Class 87, but incorporates many improvements and new features; due to this lineage, the type was initially classified as the Class 87/2 prior to introduction. However, on account of its many visual and technical differences, it was decided to reclassify the locomotive as its own TOPS class. The Class 90s were primarily built to replace the Class 81-85 locomotives, all of which dated from the early 1960s and had become quite unreliable due to their advanced ages.

The class is fitted with rheostatic brakes, in addition to standard Westinghouse air brake equipment. A Time-Division Multiplexer (TDM) is fitted to enable two or more locomotives to work in multiple or to work a push-pull passenger train with a Driving Van Trailer (DVT), DBSO or Propelling Control Vehicle. Single-phase 1,000 V electric train supply (ETS) is provided to facilitate passenger working.

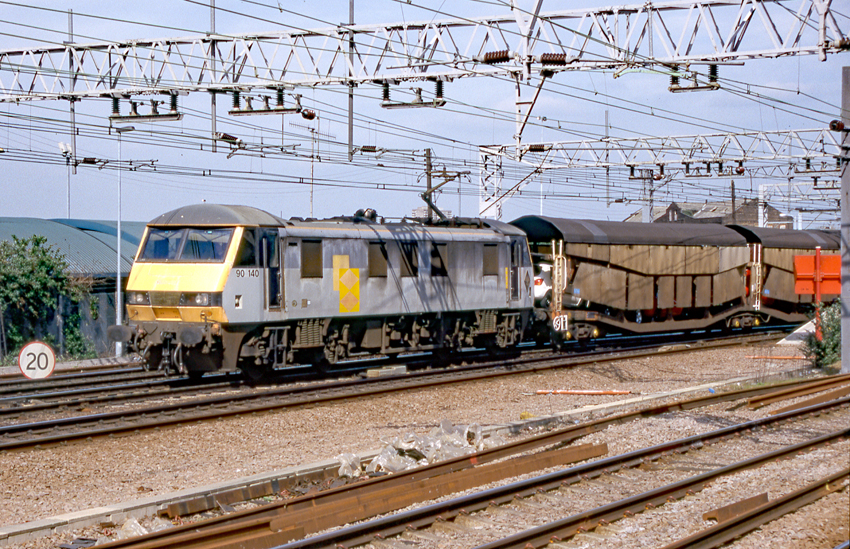
A Class 90/1 hauling a car train at Stratford

In 1991, with the sectorisation of British Rail removing shared mixed-traffic locomotives and limiting them to specific sectors, 25 locomotives were dedicated for freight traffic; they were reclassified Class 90/1 and renumbered 90126–150, with a 26th (90125) converted in 1993. The modifications included lowering the maximum speed to 75 mph (121 km/h), isolating the ETS by removing the ETH jumper cables and, later, by removing the drop-head buckeye and associated rubbing plate. Many of these locomotives were repainted into the new Railfreight Distribution two-tone grey livery, which was replaced by a revised version in 1994. Three locomotives (90128, 90129 and 90130) received special continental liveries: (NMBS/SNCB blue, Deutsche Bahn red and SNCF grey respectively) to celebrate the Freightconnection event in 1992.

In October 1991, the BR Parcels sector rebranded itself as Rail Express Systems, introducing a new livery; locomotives were dedicated to Royal Mail parcels services and postal trains. They were primarily used on London-Glasgow, London-Newcastle and Birmingham-Glasgow services. Five locomotives, 90016-020, were repainted into the new livery between October 1991 and March 1992.

Of the remaining locomotives, the first 15 (90001-015) were operated by InterCity West Coast on express passenger services and 90021-025 were operated by Railfreight Distribution; the latter group remained as standard Class 90/0 locomotives to enable them to operate charter trains or be used on standard passenger trains. Due to the Class 91s' initial unreliability, Railfreight Distribution leased some of their 90/0s to InterCity for use on the ECML with Mark 4 coaches. These services were usually limited to London Kings Cross to Leeds/York services, due to their lower 110 mph (177 km/h) top speed.

Many Class 90 locomotives have received names: passenger locomotives were named after cities, newspapers or famous institutions; many of the freight locomotives were given names with a commercial link. The Class 90 was the first new locomotive to carry InterCity Swallow livery.

== Current operators ==
Upon the privatisation of British Rail in 1996, the Class 90 fleet was divided between several train operating companies:

=== DB Cargo UK ===
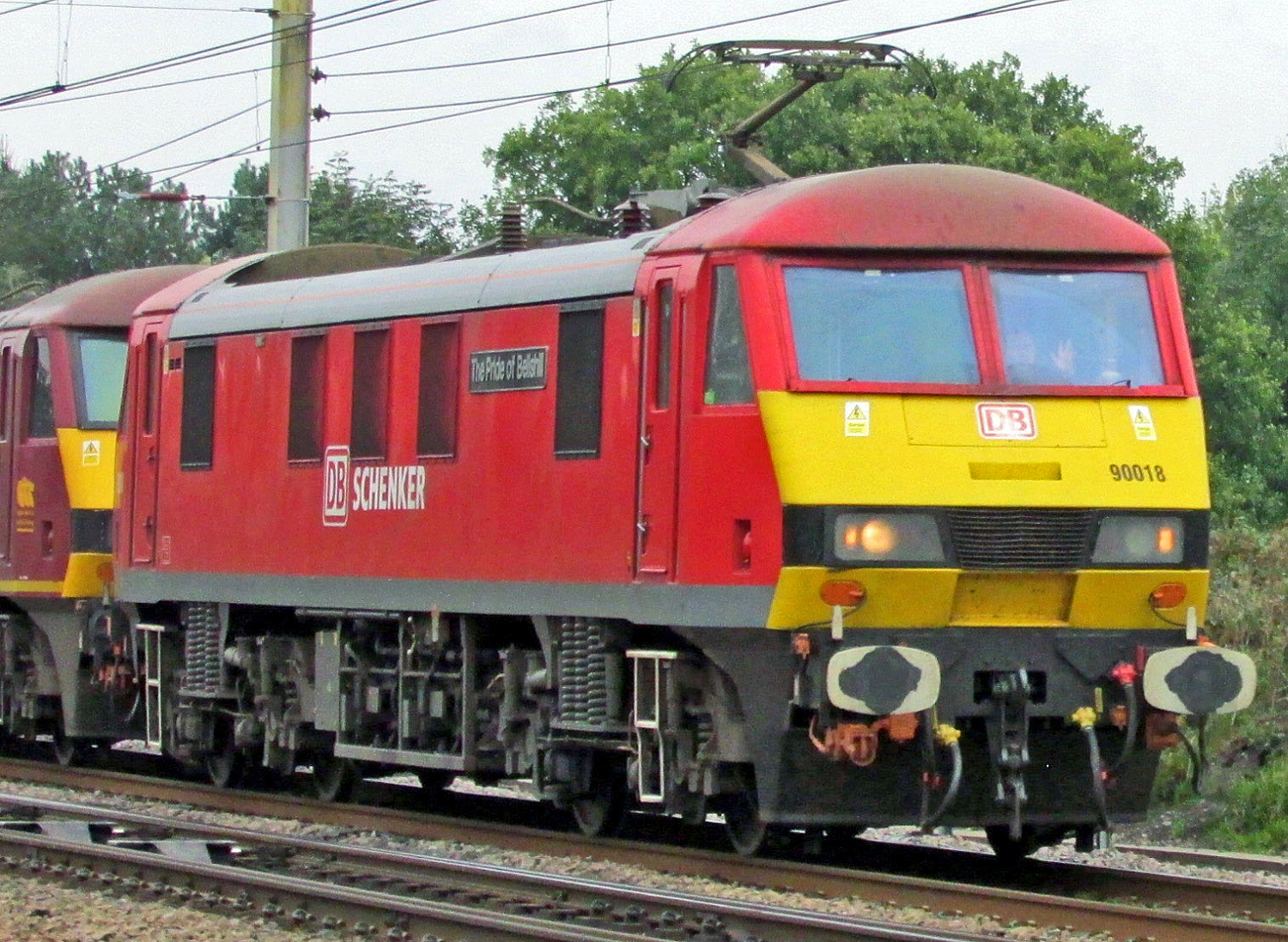
DB Schenker Class 90 at Euxton in 2016

English, Welsh & Scottish Railway acquired the largest fleet: 20 locomotives from Railfreight Distribution and five from Rail Express Systems.

DB Cargo UK Class 90s were planned to be hired to Grand Central to haul Mark 4 carriages on its London Euston to Blackpool North services; however, these were abandoned permanently on 10 September 2020.

In July 2023, DB Cargo announced that it was withdrawing its entire Class 90 locomotive fleet from active service, due to high energy costs, and stated that this would be a permanent move. Managing director Andrea Rossi stated that the company would focus instead on alternative methods to meet their climate targets, including expansion of the use of biofuels and HVO-based resources; in the meantime, electric-hauled traction would be replaced by diesel power. DB stated that they were working towards the sale/disposal of their Class 90 fleet. In September 2023, DB Cargo published a list of locomotives that would be sold to the highest bidder. (Note: Nos. 90017/018/022/023/025/027/030/031/032/033/038/040) Eight of these were sold subsequently to Sandbach Commercial Dismantlers; the first three (90030, 90033 and 90038) left Crewe Electric depot by road for storage pending final scrapping in late April 2024.

=== Freightliner ===
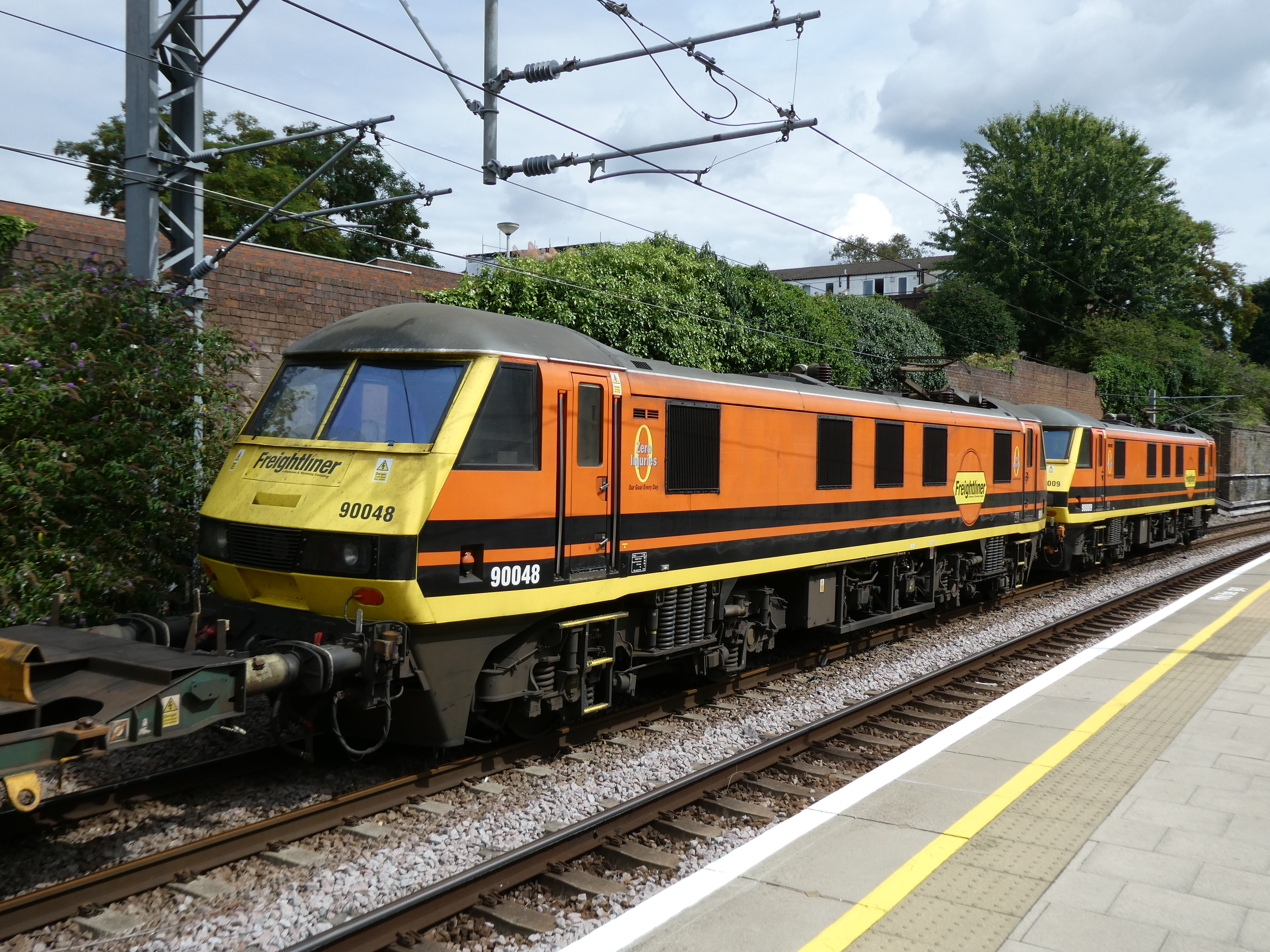
Freightliner Class 90 locomotives in 2025

Freightliner inherited ten Class 90/1 locomotives, which were numbered 90141-150 and had been leased from Porterbrook; these have since been returned to their original Class 90/0 configuration. Freightliner also acquired 90016 from EWS, as a replacement for 90050 which was withdrawn in 2004 following fire damage while on lease to EWS. 90050 was stored subsequently at Crewe Basford Hall for use as a donor of spare parts to its other Class 90 locomotives; in October 2023, it was loaned long-term to Crewe Heritage Centre where it has received cosmetic improvements.

During 2019, Freightliner purchased thirteen Class 90 locomotives from Porterbrook Leasing, which were formerly operated by Abellio Greater Anglia. Upon transfer of the fleet in May 2020, the locos underwent a modification programme to match the freight Class 90 specification; they have since replaced Freightliner's Class 86 locomotives, which date back to the mid-1960s. In July 2020, 90014 was painted by Toton TMD and given the name Over the Rainbow.

=== Locomotive Services Limited ===
Following their withdrawal by Abellio Greater Anglia in 2020, 90001 and 90002 were acquired by Locomotive Services Limited (LSL) to operate their excursion trains alongside their Class 86 and Class 87. Their use varies between working excursions along the West Coast Main Line between London Euston and Glasgow Central, sometimes working as part of a tour worked partly by a steam locomotive. After purchase by LSL, the two locomotives were repainted into their original InterCity Swallow livery; 90001 was named Royal Scot and 90002 Wolf of Badenoch. In June 2025, 90026 was acquired from DB Cargo UK.

== Former operators ==
=== Caledonian Sleeper ===
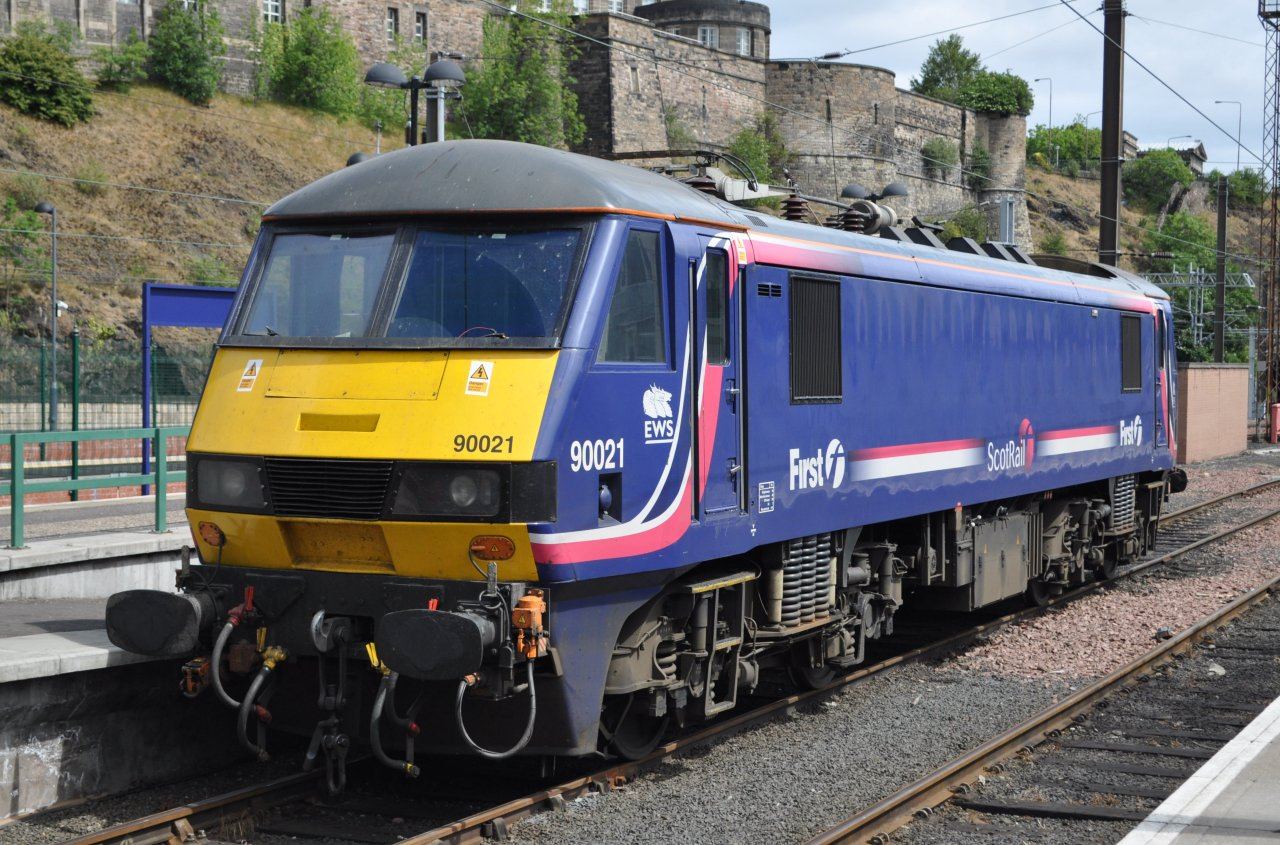
First ScotRail Class 90 at Edinburgh Waverley in 2009

Virgin Trains contracted Class 87s were replaced by English, Welsh and Scottish Railway (EWS) Class 90s in March 1998. An agreement was reached in 2006 to paint a number of Class 90s into First ScotRail colours, for exclusive use hauling the Caledonian Sleeper. In 2015, with Serco taking over the Caledonian Sleeper franchise, the haulage contract moved to GB Railfreight, which chose to use Class 92s on the WCML; however, due to mechanical problems, a Class 90 locomotive was used. This was initially hired from DB Cargo UK, but later changed to Freightliner. Their operation on the route ended in October 2019.

=== East Coast Main Line ===
In the late 1990s, GNER hired Class 90s to stand in for Class 91s on London Kings Cross to Leeds services; 90024 was repainted into their dark blue livery. In 2016, DB Cargo Class 90s were returned to the East Coast Main Line on Virgin Trains East Coast's London to Newark Northgate, Leeds and Newcastle services, whilst the Class 91 locomotives were overhauled. These continued to be operated by London North Eastern Railway until 9 June 2019.

=== Greater Anglia ===
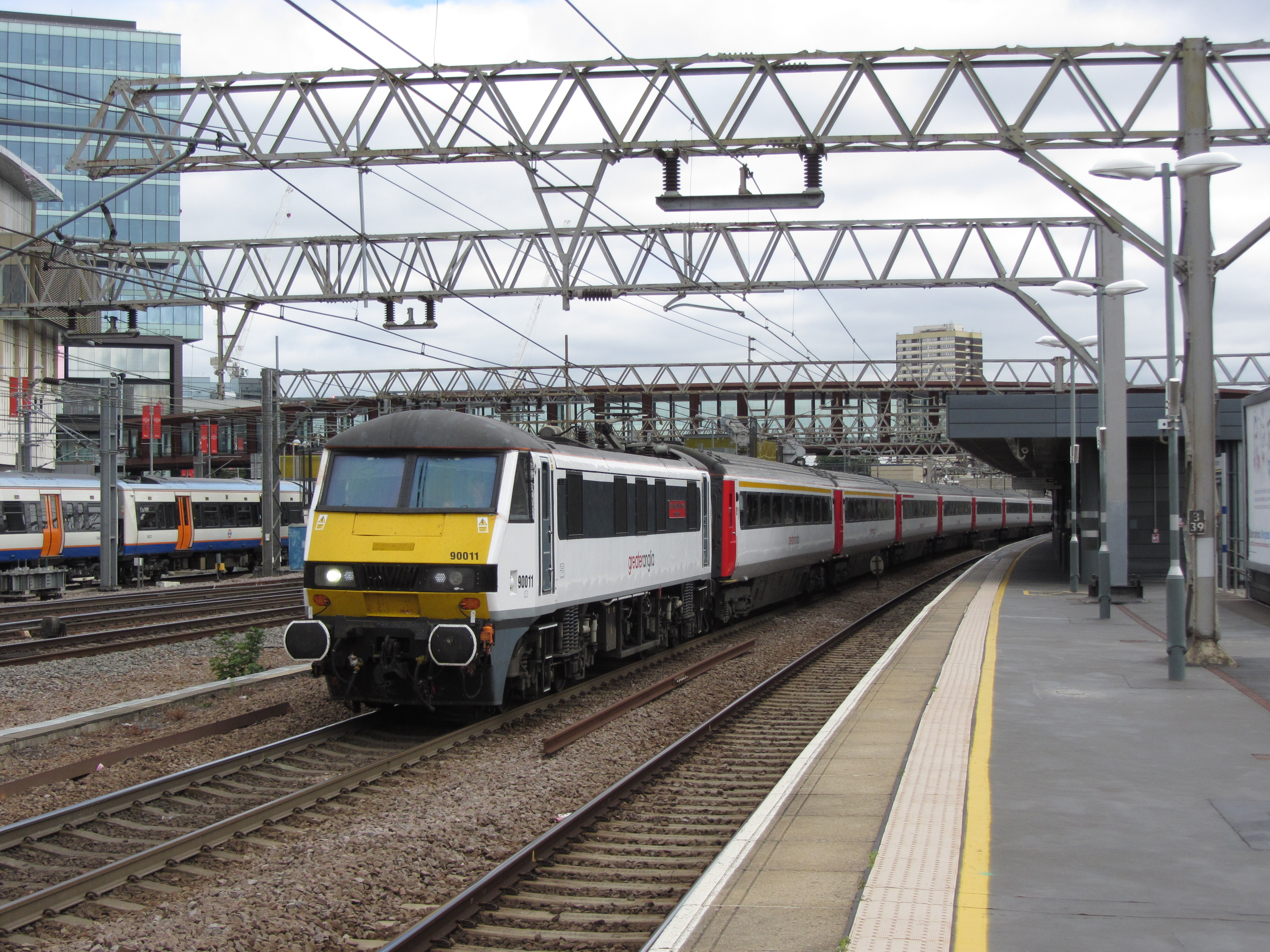
Greater Anglia Class 90 at Stratford in 2017

As part of their East Anglia franchise bid, National Express East Anglia provided a fleet plan to replace the ageing Class 86 locomotives on the Great Eastern Main Line with the more powerful and newer Class 90 locomotives, hoping this would improve performance and reduce operating costs. The Class 90s were to become available due to Virgin Trains' plan to replace all locomotive-hauled passenger trains with Class 390 Pendolino units, freeing up their 15 Class 90 locomotives. 90001-015 were delivered progressively to Crown Point TMD in Norwich. These locomotives had their original louvered horn covers replaced with a single plate design with V-patterned holes, matching the Mark 3 DVTs.

Abellio Greater Anglia took on the franchise in February 2012 and continued to operate the locomotives.

In January 2020, the Class 745 FLIRT sets began entering service to replace the Class 90 sets. Following the introduction of these units, the locomotive-hauled sets were withdrawn from service, with the last set running its last services on 24 March 2020. Thirteen moved to Freightliner to replace the Class 86s, while the other two were purchased by Locomotive Services Limited.

=== Virgin Trains ===
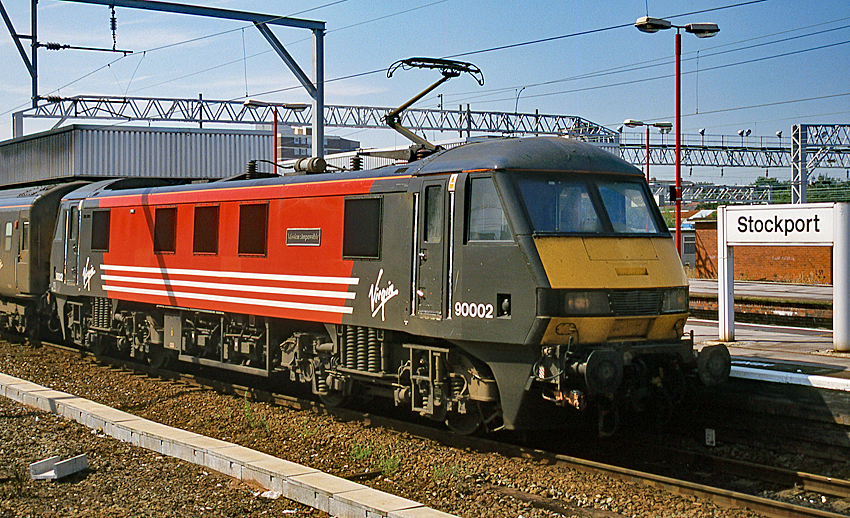
Virgin Trains Mission: Impossible at Stockport in 2002

Virgin Trains inherited 15 locomotives at privatisation, 90001-015, to work its passenger trains on the WCML. They were based at Willesden TMD for services from London Euston to Birmingham New Street, Wolverhampton, Crewe, Manchester Piccadilly, Liverpool Lime Street, Preston and Glasgow Central.

In 1998, 90002 became the first locomotive to be repainted in Virgin Trains' red and black livery; it was named Mission: Impossible to launch the challenge of upgrading passenger services on the WCML. The rest of the fleet was quickly repainted into the new livery.

In 2002, Class 390 Pendolino electric multiple units started to enter service to replace locomotive-hauled trains on the WCML. The first locomotives to be replaced were the elderly Class 86/2s and some of the less reliable Class 87 locomotives. However, since the Class 90 fleet was relatively small and subsequently non-standard, it was decided to retain the larger Class 87 fleet in preference to the Class 90s. Therefore, from March 2004, Virgin started to return its Class 90 fleet to the ROSCO, allowing the locos to transfer to the new One (later National Express East Anglia) operator.

Following the Grayrigg derailment and subsequent scrapping of 390033 in 2007, Virgin Trains had the need for an additional set as a stop gap before another Pendolino set was built. As a result, Virgin used Class 90 locomotives hired from DB Schenker, and later Freightliner, along with a rake of Mark 3 coaching stock and a DVT. Nicknamed the Pretendolino, this received reupholstered seating, power points, wi-fi and a full external re-paint at Wabtec, Doncaster, in 2009. Virgin used this set, with a Class 90 locomotive hired from Freightliner, on a Friday relief service between Euston and Crewe, via Birmingham, until December 2012. It was hired out as a charter train and was used sometimes on London-Birmingham services in the event of a Pendolino shortage.

From the December 2013 timetable change, Virgin Trains used the Mark 3 set once again on London-Birmingham services on a Thursday and Friday only basis; Class 90s were leased from Direct Rail Services, which were sub-leased from DB Schenker.

== Fleet ==
=== Summary ===
Summary
Subclass	Number built (year)	Operator	Number	TOPS number range
Class 90	50 (1987–90)	Locomotive Services Limited	3	90001-90002, 90026
Class 90	50 (1987–90)	Freightliner	26	90003-90016, 90018; 90040-90050
Class 90	50 (1987–90)	DB Cargo UK	11	90019-90021, 90024 90028-90029, 90034-90037, 90039

=== Fleet list ===
Key:	In service	Stored	Scrapped

Fleet list
Number	Operator	Livery	Status	Name carried	Notes
90001	Locomotive Services Limited	InterCity Swallow	In service	Royal Scot	Has had very limited use with LSL
90002	Locomotive Services Limited	InterCity Swallow	In service	Wolf of Badenoch	
90003	Freightliner	Freightliner Orange & Black	In service	–	
90004	Freightliner	Freightliner Orange & Black	In service	–	
90005	Freightliner	Freightliner Orange & Black	In service	–	
90006	Freightliner	Freightliner Orange & Black	In service	–	
90007	Freightliner	Freightliner Orange & Black	In service	507 (Railway) Specialist Team Royal Engineers	Named at Euston Station 4th February 2026.
90008	Freightliner	Freightliner Orange & Black	In service	–	
90009	Freightliner	Freightliner Orange & Black	In service	–	
90010	Freightliner	Freightliner Orange & Black	In service	–	
90011	Freightliner	Freightliner Orange & Black	In service	–	
90012	Freightliner	Freightliner Orange & Black	In service	–	
90013	Freightliner	Freightliner Orange & Black	In service	–	
90014	Freightliner	Freightliner Orange & Black	In service	Over The Rainbow	
90015	Freightliner	Freightliner Orange & Black	In service	–	
90016	Freightliner	Freightliner Orange & Black	In service	–	
90017	DB Cargo UK	EWS	Scrapped	–	Scrapped at Sandbach Commercial Dismantlers in Middlewich, Cheshire; July/August 2024
90018	Freightliner	Grey with red stripe and Freightliner 60 logos	In service	The Greatest Gathering	Sold by DB Cargo UK to Freightliner in April 2024. Named at The Greatest Gathering in Derby in August 2025
90019	DB Cargo UK	DB Cargo	Stored	Multimodal	Stored at Crewe Electric TMD
90020	DB Cargo UK	Grand Central	Stored	–	Stored at Crewe Electric TMD
90021	DB Cargo UK	Malcolm Logistics 100 Years	Stored	Donald Malcolm Recently repainted from FSR ‘Barbie’ to a special wrap commemorating 100 years of Malcolm Logistics.	Stored at Crewe Electric TMD
90022	DB Cargo UK	Railfreight Distribution	Scrapped	–	Scrapped at Sandbach Commercial Dismantlers, in Middlewich, Cheshire; July 2024
90023	DB Cargo UK	EWS	Scrapped	–	Scrapped at Sandbach Commercial Dismantlers, in Middlewich, Cheshire; July/August 2024
90024	DB Cargo UK	Malcolm Logistics	Stored	–	Stored at Crewe Electric TMD
90025	DB Cargo UK	Old Railfreight Distribution	Stored	–	Sold to European Metal Recycling in July 2024 and moved to their site in Liverpool for processing; scrapping not confirmed as at Oct 2024.
90026	Locomotive Services Limited	LSL Black	In service	–	
90027	DB Cargo UK	Railfreight Distribution	Scrapped	–	Scrapped at Sandbach Commercial Dismantlers, in Middlewich, Cheshire; July 2024
90028	DB Cargo UK	DB Cargo	Stored	Sir William McAlpine	Stored at Crewe Electric TMD
90029	DB Cargo UK	Grand Central	Stored	–	Stored at Crewe Electric TMD
90030	DB Cargo UK	EWS	Stored	–	Sold to Sandbach Commercial Dismantlers in July 2024 and moved to their site in Middlewich, Cheshire, for processing; scrapping not confirmed as at Oct 2024
90031	DB Cargo UK	EWS	Stored	–	Sold to European Metal Recycling in July 2024 and moved to their site in Liverpool for processing; scrapping not confirmed as at Oct 2024.
90032	DB Cargo UK	EWS	Scrapped	–	Scrapped at Sandbach Commercial Dismantlers, in Middlewich, Cheshire; July/August 2024
90033	DB Cargo UK	Railfreight Distribution	Stored	–	Sold to Sandbach Commercial Dismantlers in July 2024 and moved to their site in Middlewich, Cheshire, for processing; scrapping not confirmed as at Oct 2024
90034	DB Cargo UK	DRS Blue with DB branding	Stored	–	Stored at Crewe Electric TMD
90035	DB Cargo UK	DB Cargo	Stored	–	Stored at Crewe Electric TMD
90036	DB Cargo UK	DB without Schenker	Stored	–	Stored at Crewe Electric TMD
90037	DB Cargo UK	DB Cargo Gliders	Stored	Christine	Stored at Crewe Electric TMD
90038	DB Cargo UK	Railfreight Distribution	Scrapped	–	Scrapped at Sandbach Commercial Dismantlers, in Middlewich, Cheshire; July/August 2024
90039	DB Cargo UK	DB Cargo "I am the backbone of the economy"	Stored	–	Stored at Crewe Electric TMD
90040	Freightliner	Freightliner Orange & Black	In service	–	Sold by DB Cargo UK to Freightliner in April 2024
90041	Freightliner	Freightliner Orange & Black	In service	Pete Waterman	
90042	Freightliner	Freightliner Powerhaul	In service	–	
90043	Freightliner	Freightliner Powerhaul	In service	–	
90044	Freightliner	Freightliner Orange & Black	In service	–	First into G&W Orange
90045	Freightliner	Freightliner Powerhaul	In service	–	
90046	Freightliner	Freightliner 'Racing Green'	In service	–	
90047	Freightliner	Freightliner Orange & Black	In service	–	
90048	Freightliner	Freightliner Orange & Black	In service	–	
90049	Freightliner	Freightliner Powerhaul	In service	–	
90050	Freightliner	Freightliner Two Tone Grey	Stored	–	Loaned to and stored at Crewe Heritage Centre.

== Model railways ==
In 1988, Hornby Railways launched its first version of the Class 90 in OO gauge. Since 2017, Hornby have produced a basic representation of the prototype as part of their Railroad range in InterCity Swallow livery, whilst past examples have carried a variety of liveries.

In 2019, Bachmann Branchline launched their Class 90 in OO gauge.
