= Thomas McKay (gunner) =

British Army soldier

Staff Sergeant Thomas McKay MBE (died 17 November 2005), known as "Tam the Gun", was the District Gunner with 105th Regiment Royal Artillery from 1979 until 2005. During that time, McKay was responsible for the daily firing of the One O'Clock Gun at Edinburgh Castle, becoming the longest-serving holder of the post.

McKay was born in Lochgelly, Fife, and grew up in Musselburgh. He joined 529 Company Royal Army Service Corps, part of the Territorial Army.

The One O'clock Gun is a time signal, given at 1.00pm Monday to Saturday, and has been operating since 1861. McKay began firing the gun in July 1979, and during his long service became a recognisable Edinburgh character. At that time, the gun was a 25-pound Howitzer, although this was replaced with a L118 Light Gun, brought into service on 30 November 2001, with "Tam the Gun" firing the first round. In 1999, Sergeant McKay was awarded the MBE by the Queen, for his services to the Territorial Army.

Sergeant McKay was instrumental in setting up the One O'Clock Gun exhibition within the castle, obtaining funding from the National Lottery and Historic Scotland. The exhibition, initially temporary but now permanent, explains the origins of Edinburgh's time signals, first established in the 1840s by Charles Piazzi Smyth, the Astronomer Royal for Scotland. McKay also floated the idea of sponsorship of the One O'clock Gun, in order to secure its future. He undertook fundraising work for the Army Benevolent Fund, and in 2002 published a book of anecdotes and history relating to the gun, entitled, What Time Does Edinburgh's One O'clock Gun Fire?, the proceeds of which went towards the fund. McKay also appeared on BBC Scotland's Hogmanay Live programme, firing the gun to mark the New Year. He continued to fire the gun until his retirement on 27 January 2005. He died at his home in Dunfermline at the age of 60.

The name Tam the Gun was given to a GNER Class 91 locomotive, No.91122, in June 2006 in honour of Sergeant McKay. The locomotive was named by his widow in an official ceremony at Edinburgh Waverley. The name formerly carried on the locomotive was Double Trigger, and along with the rest of the class, lost the name when National Express East Coast took over the franchise.
