= London North Eastern Railway =

British state-owned train operating company

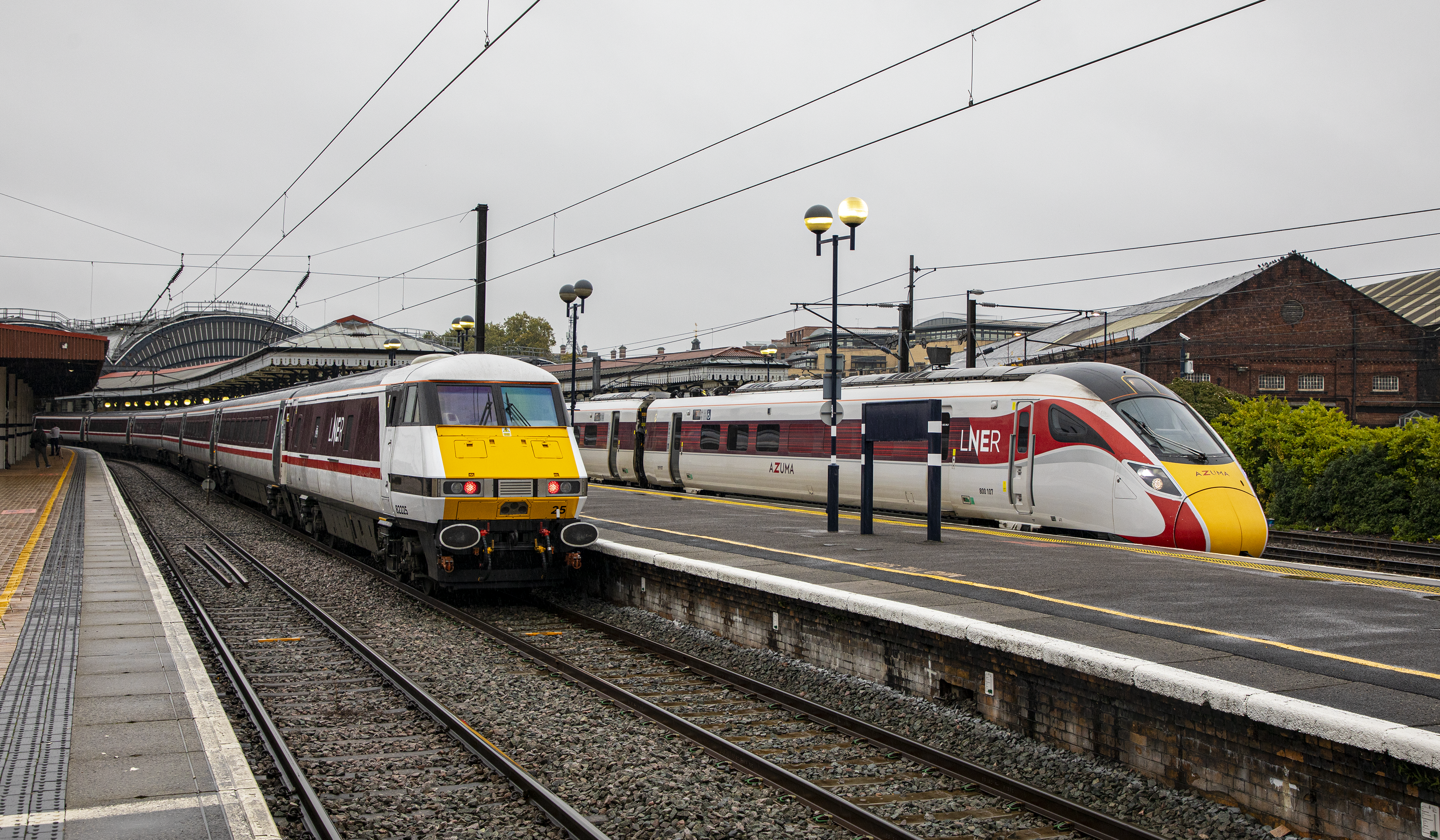
- InterCity 225 and Class 800 Azuma at York

Overview
- Main regions: Greater London; East of England; East Midlands; Yorkshire and the Humber; North East England; Scotland
- Fleet: Class 91 locomotives for InterCity 225; Class 800 Azuma; Class 801 Azuma
- Stations called at: 54
- Stations operated: 11
- Parent company: DfT Operator for Department for Transport
- Headquarters: York
- Reporting mark: GR
- Dates of operation: 24 June 2018 – present
- Predecessor: Virgin Trains East Coast

Other
- Website: www.lner.co.uk

London North Eastern Railway Limited, trading as London North Eastern Railway (LNER), is a state-owned British train operating company which operates most services on the East Coast Main Line. It is owned by DfT Operator for the Department for Transport (DfT). The company's name echoes that of the London and North Eastern Railway, one of the Big Four railway companies which operated between 1923 and 1948.

During June 2018, LNER took over the InterCity East Coast franchise, after the previous privately owned operator Virgin Trains East Coast (VTEC) returned it to the government following sustained financial difficulties. The DfT intended for the company to operate the franchise until a new public–private partnership could be established during 2020. However, in July 2019, it was announced that LNER had been given a direct-award to run these services beyond 28 June 2020, up until 25 June 2023, making it the longest franchise on the East Coast Main Line since Great North Eastern Railway (GNER). The integration of Great Northern services into LNER's operation after the expiration of the separate franchise in 2021 was being actively considered as well.

LNER provides long-distance inter-city services on the East Coast Main Line to and from London; the principal destinations served are Leeds, York, Newcastle upon Tyne and Edinburgh; their services call at 54 stations along its network, managing 11 stations directly. LNER's initial rolling stock consisted of a fleet of InterCity 125 and InterCity 225 high speed trains that it had inherited from VTEC. During May 2019, the first batch of Class 800 bi-mode high speed multiple units, based on the Hitachi A-train platform, entered service, followed by the very similar Class 801 electric multiple units during September of that year. Branded by LNER as the Azuma, their introduction has permitted the InterCity 125 sets to be withdrawn from service entirely. While most InterCity 225 sets were also withdrawn, a limited number have been retained by LNER and continue to regularly operate services along the route.

== History ==
=== Background ===
During November 2017, the then Secretary of State for Transport, Chris Grayling, announced the early termination of the InterCity East Coast franchise in 2020, three years ahead of schedule; this action had followed persistent losses incurred by Virgin Trains East Coast (VTEC), the operator of the route. VTEC had been contracted to pay more than £2 billion in franchise premiums to the British government across the final four years of its contract.

In February 2018, the end date of the VTEC franchise was brought forward to mid-2018; the Department for Transport (DfT) had decided to either negotiate with VTEC for it to continue running the franchise on a temporary non-profit basis while a new franchise competition was conducted, or to arrange for VTEC be taken over by the DfT's operator of last resort. On 16 May 2018, it was announced that the latter option was now being pursued and as such, LNER would take over operations from VTEC on 24 June 2018. The DfT also announced that LNER would be the long-term brand applied to the InterCity East Coast franchise. During a speech in May 2018, the Secretary of State for Transport stated that Great Northern services could potentially be integrated into the operation when the Thameslink, Southern and Great Northern franchise expires in 2021 as part of the overall strategy for the East Coast franchise.

The setting up of LNER is the second occasion that a government-appointed operator of last resort has taken control of the InterCity East Coast franchise; between 2009 and 2015, the franchise had been operated by East Coast. It had taken over operations from National Express East Coast after that operator had defaulted on franchise payments to the government, and thus had its franchise taken away. East Coast had been the prior operator to VTEC being selected to take over the franchise.

=== Changes ===
A major aspect of LNER's vision for the franchise has been the rollout of the European Rail Traffic Management System (ERTMS). David Horne, LNER's managing director, stated that digital signalling is necessary to unlock the full capabilities of its rolling stock, enabling drivers to continuously receive information in real time, yielding improvements in responsiveness, safety, and reliability over the traditional lineside signalling. The company has worked with Network Rail, the British government, and the trade unions on this endeavour, and has been heavily involved in the planning and preparatory works; it has also undertaken the training of its staff in readiness for its use.

By mid-2020, LNER had considerably curtailed its services in response to the significant decline of passenger travel amid the COVID-19 pandemic. From 15 June 2020, both passengers and staff on public transport in England, including LNER services, were required to wear face coverings while travelling, and that anyone failing to do so would be liable to be refused travel or fined.

LNER is one of several train operators impacted by the 2022-2024 United Kingdom railway strikes, which are the first national rail strikes in the UK for three decades. Its workers are amongst those who have voted in favour of taking industrial action due to a dispute over pay and working conditions. LNER appealed to the public not to use its services on the days of the strikes, as it was only capable of operating a minimal timetable on those dates because of the number of its staff involved.

In 2021, the company attempted to recast the East Coast Mainline timetable from the May 2022 timetable change, increasing the service between London and Newcastle to thrice hourly, and removing station stops on the current fast train to reduce journey times to 4 hours between London and Edinburgh, a feat currently only achieved once a day, by the Flying Scotsman from Edinburgh to London. This was later deferred to December 2024, and then further delayed until at least December 2025.

LNER has consistently tried to implement fares reform on its routes. In 2023, return fares were abolished on most flows, with only singles being offered in each direction. This also coincided with the removal of the off-peak fare for flows to and from Kings Cross. In January 2024, LNER announced a simpler fares trial for Newcastle, Berwick-upon-Tweed and Edinburgh to London Kings Cross, scrapping the super off-peak fares, the regulated fare and a de facto cap on ticket prices, and replacing it with a 70-minute flex, a yield managed advance fare which allows customers to catch a train 70 minutes before or after their train. This left three fare tiers on these flows, with advance tickets being the cheapest but least flexible ticket, the 70 minute flex, and the anytime fare, the only fare guaranteed to be available. In September 2024, after well published loopholes being found to this trial, the trial was expanded to every station between Newcastle and Edinburgh.

=== Incidents ===
Eleven people were treated in hospital after a stabbing incident on board a LNER London-bound Azuma train on the evening of 1 November 2025, shortly after leaving Peterborough. The train was diverted to Huntingdon where ambulances and police were waiting, and a suspect arrested. The suspect is scheduled for trial on 26 October 2026.

== Services ==
As of December 2025, the off-peak weekday service pattern is as follows.

London Kings Cross to Yorkshire and Lincoln
Route	tph	Calling at
London King's Cross to Leeds	1	Peterborough; Grantham; Doncaster; Wakefield Westgate; 1tpd extends to Skipton calling at Shipley and Keighley
London King's Cross to Bradford Forster Square	1/2	Stevenage; Newark Northgate; Doncaster; Wakefield Westgate; Leeds; Shipley; Alternates with Harrogate service
London King's Cross to Harrogate	1/2	Stevenage; Newark Northgate; Doncaster; Wakefield Westgate; Leeds; Horsforth; Alternates with Bradford service
London King's Cross to York	1/2	Peterborough; Retford; Doncaster; 1tpd extends to Middlesbrough calling at Thornaby
London King's Cross to Lincoln	1/2	Peterborough; Grantham; Newark Northgate; 1tpd extends to Hull calling at Retford, Doncaster, Selby and Brough instead of Lincoln
London Kings Cross to Scotland and Newcastle
Route	tph	Calling at
London King's Cross to Edinburgh Waverley	1	York; Newcastle
London King's Cross to Edinburgh Waverley	1	Peterborough; Newark Northgate; Doncaster; York; Darlington; Newcastle; Alnmouth (1tp2h); Berwick-upon-Tweed (1tp2h); Alnmouth and Berwick served by alternate trains; 5tpd stop additionally at Morpeth and Dunbar; 4tpd extend to Aberdeen calling at Haymarket, Inverkeithing, Kirkcaldy, Leuchars, Dundee, Arbroath, Montrose and Stonehaven; 1tpd extends to Inverness calling at Haymarket, Falkirk Grahamston, Stirling, Gleneagles, Perth, Pitlochry, Kingussie and Aviemore; 1tpd stops additionally at Reston
London King's Cross to Newcastle	1	Stevenage; Grantham; York; Northallerton; Darlington; Durham

=== Service expansions ===
On 21 October 2019, four London King's Cross to Newark Northgate were extended to Lincoln in addition to the existing one train a day between Lincoln and the capital. A sixth return service would be introduced in December 2019 alongside six return between London King's Cross and Harrogate.

In 2018, Rail Minister Jo Johnson announced a new direct service between London King's Cross and Middlesbrough, with the service beginning in December 2021, with plans for a regular two-hourly service to be introduced following upgrades to Middlesbrough Station.

Direct services to Sunderland introduced by Virgin were withdrawn in December 2024 alongside the final daily service to Glasgow Central, which had been gradually reduced since the 2000s after upgrades to the West Coast Main Line reduced journey times.

A daily service between London King's Cross and Cleethorpes as an extension of a Lincoln service is currently being explored.

=== Named services ===
London North Eastern Railway operates a number of named passenger services.

Name	Origin	Destination	Services	Other details
Carolean Express	Edinburgh Waverley	London King's Cross	1E12 11:00 Edinburgh Waverley to London Kings Cross 1S14 11:30 London Kings Cross to Edinburgh Waverley	Runs from London to Edinburgh only. Named to commemorate the coronation of Charles III and Camilla.
Flying Scotsman	Edinburgh Waverley	London King's Cross	1E10 10:00 Edinburgh Waverley to London Kings Cross 1S12 10:30 London Kings Cross to Edinburgh Waverley	Service began 1862 in both directions; named by LNER in 1924. Only stops at Newcastle and York.
Highland Chieftain	Inverness	London King's Cross	1E13 07:55 Inverness to London Kings Cross 1S15 12:03 London Kings Cross to Inverness	The longest LNER route
Northern Lights	Aberdeen	London King's Cross	1E15 09:52 Aberdeen to London Kings Cross 1S11 10:03 London Kings Cross to Aberdeen	
West Riding Limited	Bradford Forster Square	London King's Cross	1A07 06:30 Bradford Forster Square to London Kings Cross 1D21 15:40 London Kings Cross to Bradford Forster Square	Introduced in 1937 as a limited stop service hauled by Streamlined Locomotives like Mallard. Northbound service added in December 2025 following introduction of five additional London to Bradford services

== Rolling stock ==
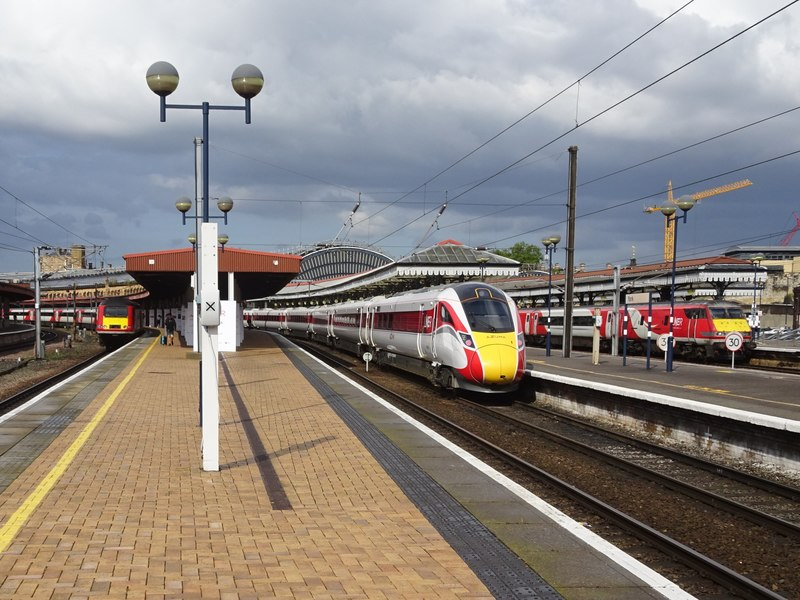
Three generations of East Coast Main Line trains at York. A Class 43 InterCity 125 (left) with a Class 800 Azuma (centre) and a InterCity 225 (right)

At its commencement, LNER operated a fleet of diesel-powered InterCity 125 and electric InterCity 225 high speed trains that it had inherited from VTEC. Since September 2016, VTEC had also hired three Class 90s from DB Cargo for use on services to Newark, York and Leeds. LNER inherited these locomotives and retained them until June 2019 to cover for the shortage of Class 91 locomotives.

During May 2019, the first batch of Class 800 new-build high speed trains began entering service, the very similar Class 801 trains also followed in September of that year. These units are based on the Hitachi A-train design and LNER retained the Azuma brand for the units which was originally designated by VTEC. The initial operation of these units allowed the InterCity 125 and InterCity 225 fleets to be replaced gradually. On 15 May, the first Azuma train to enter service, a nine-carriage Class 800/1, was operated on the Leeds route from King's Cross. Other subclasses of the Class 800 and 801 variants entered service afterwards; the first two five-carriage Class 801/1 sets entered service on 16 September, operating as a ten-carriage train; the first lot of five-carriage Class 800/2 sets entered service to coincide with the launch of the new King's Cross - Lincoln services on 21 October while the first two nine-carriage Class 801/2 sets entered service on 18 November. By May 2021, all units in the Azuma fleet had entered revenue service following unit 800109's return to service, which was the unit involved in the derailment at Neville Hill TMD in November 2019 and subsequently had to undergo repairs.

Following the withdrawal of the InterCity 125 fleet in December 2019, it was previously thought that the InterCity 225 fleet would be fully withdrawn by June 2020. However, on 29 January 2020, LNER announced that they would be retaining a limited number of the InterCity 225 fleet to deliver all of the benefits of their December 2021 timetable. In September 2020, Eversholt Rail Group (the train owner) and London North Eastern Railway extended their lease to ten units by 2023; additionally, there are options to extend the time frame up to 2024. These retained units have been subject to an overhaul performed at Wabtec's Doncaster plant. At the end of service on 15 January 2021, the remaining serviceable InterCity 225 sets went into storage temporarily as part of the East Coast Upgrade. Originally, the plan was to return the sets to service for 7 June 2021, however, the first set actually re-entered service on 11 May 2021 due to a number of Azuma sets having to be taken temporarily out of service for inspections and repairs where appropriate.

During June 2022, LNER unveiled its new livery, based on the traditional British Rail-era Intercity styling, on one of its remaining InterCity 225 sets.

In November 2023, LNER announced an order of 10 tri-mode multiple units from CAF to serve the ECML, including an 8-year maintenance agreement. The contract is valued at over €500 million and is financed by rolling stock company, Porterbrook. The trains will be able to run on 25kV 50 Hz electrification, battery and diesel power. In August 2024 it was announced that the trains would be called Class 897 under the TOPS classification system.

In March 2026, LNER announced that they were halfway through renewing all standard class seats on the whole Azuma fleet following complaints.

=== Current fleet ===
Class	Image	Type	Top speed		Qty.	Carriages	Built
Class	Image	Type	mph	km/h	Qty.	Carriages	Built
InterCity 225 trains							
91		Electric locomotive	125	200	12	8 sets formed of 7 carriages	1988–1991
Mark 4		Passenger carriage	125	200	73	8 sets formed of 7 carriages	1989–1992
Driving Van Trailer		Control car	125	200	9	8 sets formed of 7 carriages	1989-1991
Hitachi AT300 Azuma trains							
800/1		Bi-mode multiple unit	125	200	13	9	2015-2018
800/2		Bi-mode multiple unit	125	200	10	5	2018
801/1		Electric multiple unit	125	200	12	5	2017-2020
801/2		Electric multiple unit	125	200	30	9	2017-2020

=== Future fleet ===
In November 2023, LNER placed an order for 10 ten-car tri-mode (electric, diesel and battery power) Civity trains from CAF. In August 2024, it was announced that the units will be designated Class 897 under TOPS. The trains will be branded as 'Serenza'. They are expected to be the first new trains as part of Great British Railways.

Family	Class	Type	Top speed		Number	Carriages	Seats	Expected Delivery
Family	Class	Type	mph	km/h	Number	Carriages	Seats	Expected Delivery
CAF Civity	897 Serenza	Tri-Mode	TBA	TBA	10	10	569	2028

=== Past fleet ===
The entry into service of the Azuma fleet allowed all fourteen of LNER's HST sets to be withdrawn from service, with the last three sets working their final services with LNER on 15 December 2019. Nine of the sets transferred to East Midlands Railway, with two power cars from one set transferring to CrossCountry to supplement its existing five sets.

Class	Image	Type	Top speed		Number	Built	Carriages
Class	Image	Type	mph	km/h	Number	Built	Carriages
InterCity 125 trains (HSTs)
43		Diesel locomotive	125	200	32	1976–1982	14 sets formed of 9 carriages each
Mark 3		Passenger carriage	125	200	130	1975–1988	14 sets formed of 9 carriages each
InterCity 225 trains
91		Electric locomotive	140	225	19	1988–1991	22 sets formed of 9 carriages each
Mark 4		Passenger carriage	140	225	198	1989–1992	22 sets formed of 9 carriages each
Driving Van Trailer		Control car	140	225	22	1989–1991	22 sets formed of 9 carriages each

== Depots ==
LNER's fleet is stored and maintained at the following depots:

- Aberdeen Clayhills Carriage Maintenance Depot – managed by LNER
- Bounds Green TMD, London – managed by Hitachi
- Craigentinny TMD, Edinburgh – managed by Hitachi
- Doncaster Carr Rail Depot – managed by Hitachi
- Heaton TMD, Newcastle – managed by Northern
- Neville Hill TMD, Leeds – managed by Northern

Preceded by Virgin Trains East Coast	Operator of InterCity East Coast franchise 2018–	Succeeded by Incumbent
