= Aberdeen Clayhills Carriage Maintenance Depot =

Railway maintenance depot in Aberdeen, Scotland

- Clayhills Depot in 2011, with platforms at Aberdeen Station in the foreground
- Interactive map of Aberdeen Clayhills Carriage Maintenance Depot

Location
- Location: Aberdeen, Scotland
- Coordinates: 57.1412°N 2.0981°W
- OS grid: NJ941058

Characteristics
- Owner: Network Rail
- Operator: London North Eastern Railway
- Depot code: AC
- Type: Bi-mode multiple unit Diesel multiple unit High Speed Train

History
- Former depot code: 61B (1948 – May 1973)

Aberdeen Clayhills Carriage Maintenance Depot is a stabling point located in Aberdeen, Scotland. The depot is situated on the Denburn Valley Line and is located near Aberdeen station.

The depot code is AC.

== History ==
Before their withdrawal from the franchise at the end of 2019, the depot serviced London North Eastern Railway (LNER) Class 43 High Speed Trains.

Clayhills Depot was upgraded in 2017 at a cost of £1.8 million. The project involved construction of a new 120-metre servicing apron; a 60-metre trackpan for oily waste with associated drainage; four new refuelling points with modifications to the fuel distribution network; three new controlled emission toilet facilities; a plant room, and dispensers for AdBlue and water tanking. Alterations to mechanical and electrical services, pipework, drainage and lighting, together with new pedestrian walkways and access gantries was also undertaken.

== Operations ==
LNER leases Clayhills from Network Rail and is responsible for maintaining the track within the depot.

Clayhills maintains Class 800 Azumas operated by LNER. ScotRail and Caledonian Sleeper rolling stock are also maintained at the depot.
