= West Riding Limited =

Former named railway service from London King's Cross to Bradford, England

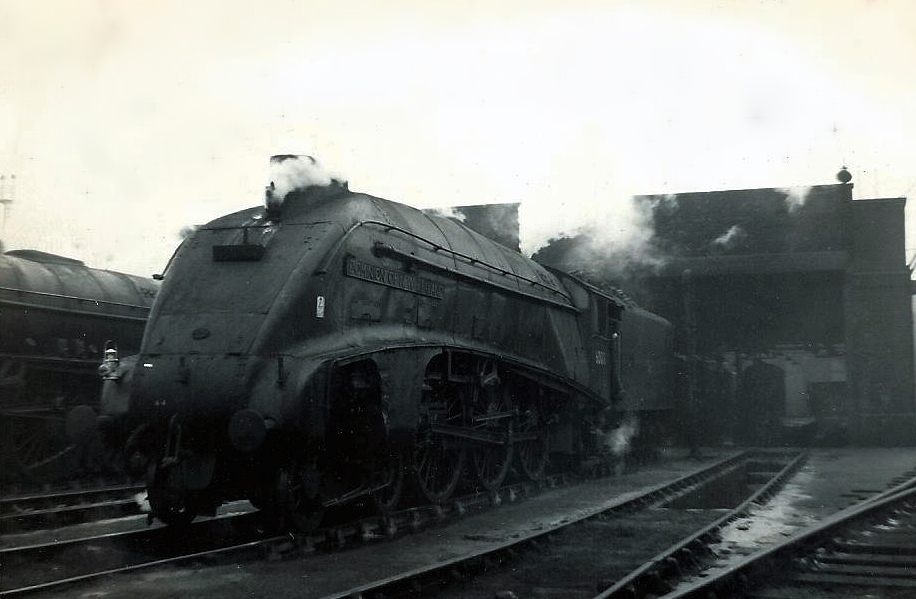
- LNER Class A4 Dominion of New Zealand which hauled the inaugural train in 1937

Overview
- Service type: Passenger train
- First service: 27 September 1937
- Current operator: London North Eastern Railway
- Former operators: LNER; BR

Route
- Termini: London King's Cross; Bradford
- Service frequency: Daily (weekdays only - does run Saturday but not named)
- Line used: East Coast Main Line

The West Riding Limited is a named passenger train operating in the United Kingdom.

== History ==
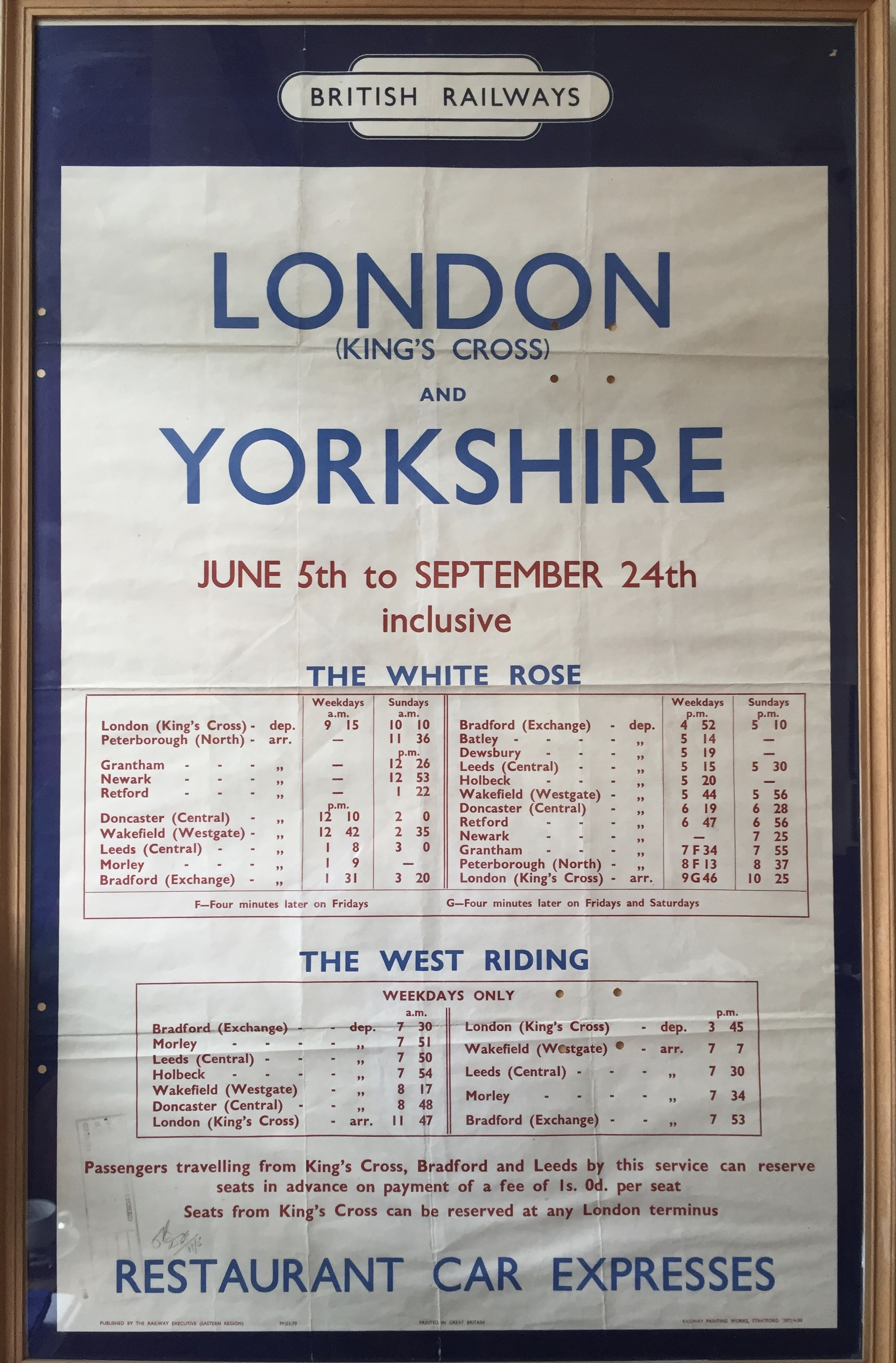
Advert from 1950

The West Riding Limited was introduced by the London and North Eastern Railway in 1937 to operate between London King's Cross and Leeds and Bradford. The company built a new set of carriages, almost identical to the Coronation sets of 1937, differing in internal decoration. The train consisted of four twin articulated coaches with two kitchen cars in each train set. There were seats for 48 first class and 168 third class passengers. It travelled from King's Cross to Bradford at an average speed of 63.3 miles per hour (101.9 km/h). The service started on 27 September 1937 when the first train was hauled by LNER Class A4 No. 4492 Dominion of New Zealand which had only entered service three months earlier.

The train was stored for the duration of the Second World War and service resumed in 1949.

The name has been retained by London North Eastern Railway and as of 2024 is operated as the 06:30 departure from Bradford Forster Square, arriving at London King's Cross at 08:59.
