= British Rail Class 89 =

Prototype Co-Co electric locomotive

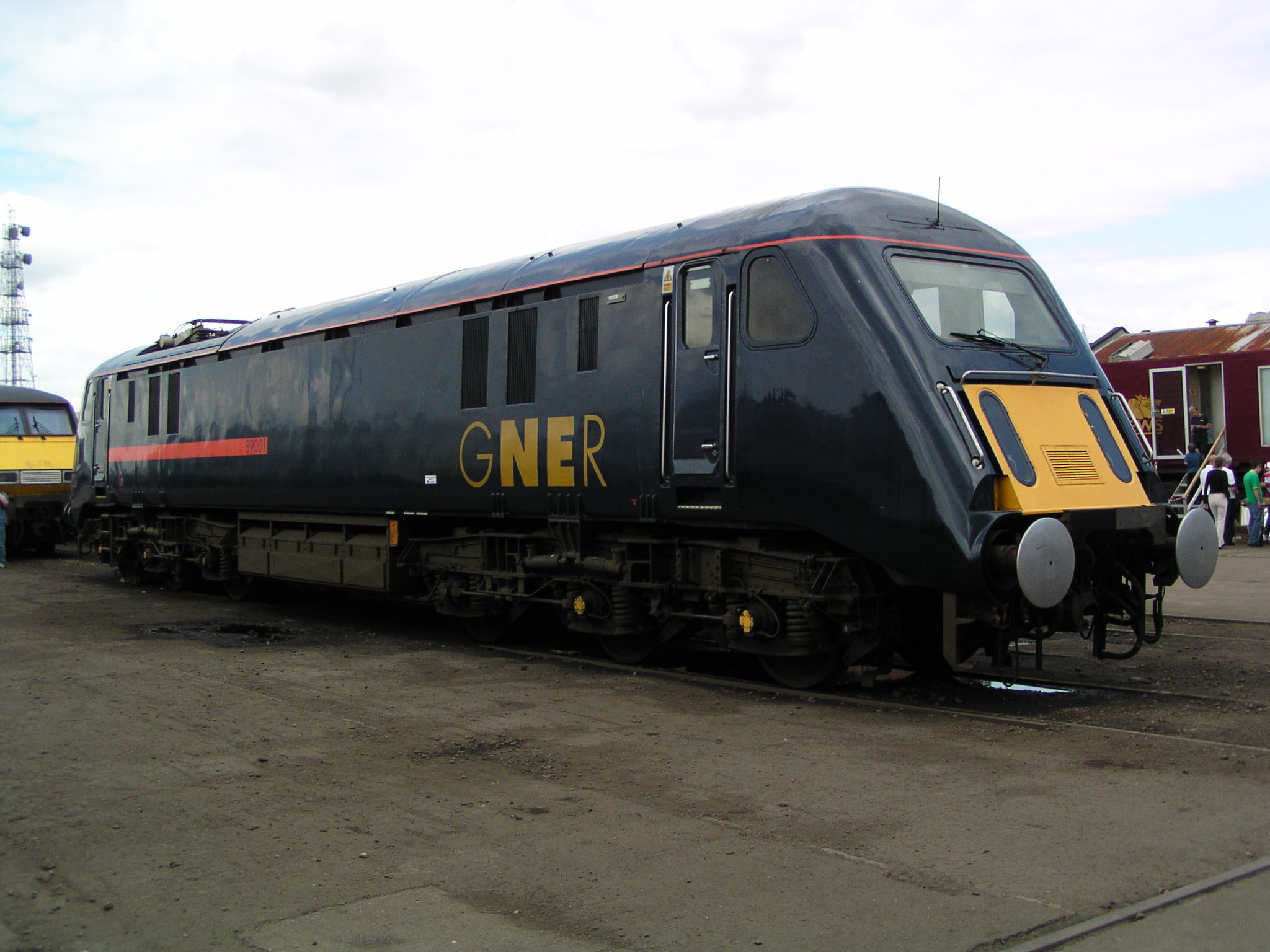
- 89001 in GNER livery at Doncaster Works in 2003
Type and origin
- Power type: Electric
- Designer: Brush Traction
- Builder: BREL, Crewe Works
- Serial number: 875
- Build date: 1986
- Total produced: 1
Specifications
- Configuration
  - UIC: Co′Co′
  - Commonwealth: Co-Co
- Gauge: 1,435 mm (4 ft 8 1/2 in) standard gauge
- Wheel diameter: 1.070 m (3 ft 6.1 in)
- Minimum curve: 80 m (262 ft 6 in)
- Wheelbase: 15.100 m (49 ft 6.5 in)
  - Axle spacing (Asymmetrical): Axles 1–2 and 5–6: 2.100 m (6 ft 10.7 in); Axles 2–3 and 4–5: 2.300 m (7 ft 6.6 in)
  - Bogie: 4.400 m (14 ft 5.2 in)
- Pivot centres: 10.900 m (35 ft 9.1 in)
- Length: 19.798 m (64 ft 11.4 in) (over buffers)
- Width: 2.736 m (8 ft 11.7 in)
- Height
  - Pantograph: 3.977 m (13 ft 0.6 in)
  - Body height: 3.810 m (12 ft 6.0 in)
- Axle load: 17.6 t (17.4 LT; 19.4 ST)
- Loco weight: 105 t (103 LT; 116 ST)
- Electric system/s: 25 kV 50 Hz AC overhead
- Current pickup: Brecknell Willis high speed pantograph
- Traction motors: 6 × Brush Traction TM 2201A
  - Continuous: 808 A per motor
- MU working: TDM
- Train heating: Electric Train Supply, index 95 (510 kVA at 893 V AC)
- Loco brake: Air and rheostatic
- Train brakes: Air
- Safety systems: AWS
- Couplers: Buckeye
Performance figures
- Maximum speed: Design: 125 mph (201 km/h); Service: 110 mph (177 km/h)
- Power output
  - Continuous: 4,286 kW (5,748 hp) at rails
- Tractive effort
  - Starting: 205 kN (46,000 lb_{f})
  - Continuous: 105 kN (24,000 lb_{f}) at 91 mph (147 km/h)
- Brakeforce: 53% of loco weight (inc. rheostatic brake)
Career
- Operators: British Rail InterCity sector, Great North Eastern Railway
- Class: 89
- Numbers: 89001
- Nicknames: Aardvark; Badger
- Axle load class: Route Availability 6
- Locale: East Coast Main Line, West Coast Main Line
- Delivered: 2 October 1986
- First run: 9 February 1987
- Withdrawn: July 1992 (BR), October 2000 (GNER)
- Current owner: AC Locomotive Group
- Disposition: Preserved

The British Rail Class 89 is a one-off prototype electric locomotive, which was built in 1986 by British Rail Engineering Limited's Crewe Works. It was used on test trains on both the West Coast and East Coast Main Lines. The locomotive was fitted with advanced power control systems and developed more than 6,000 bhp (4,500 kW). After being withdrawn in 1992, it was returned to service in 1996, before being withdrawn again in 2000. After overhaul, it completed a series of main line test runs in October 2025.

== Design ==
The Class 89 locomotive was designed by Brush Traction in Loughborough, to meet a specification issued by British Rail (BR), which subsequently changed its requirements; this was not before Brush had committed to building the prototype locomotive.

The locomotive has six DC traction motors. The main armature current for all the motors is fed from a common thyristor drive, with each motor having an independent field current controller. The field current controllers comprise a two quadrant chopper inside a thyristor bridge. The bipolar transistor based choppers provide a fast fine control of motor torque for electric braking and slip control, while the thyristor bridge is used to invert the field current polarity.

== History ==
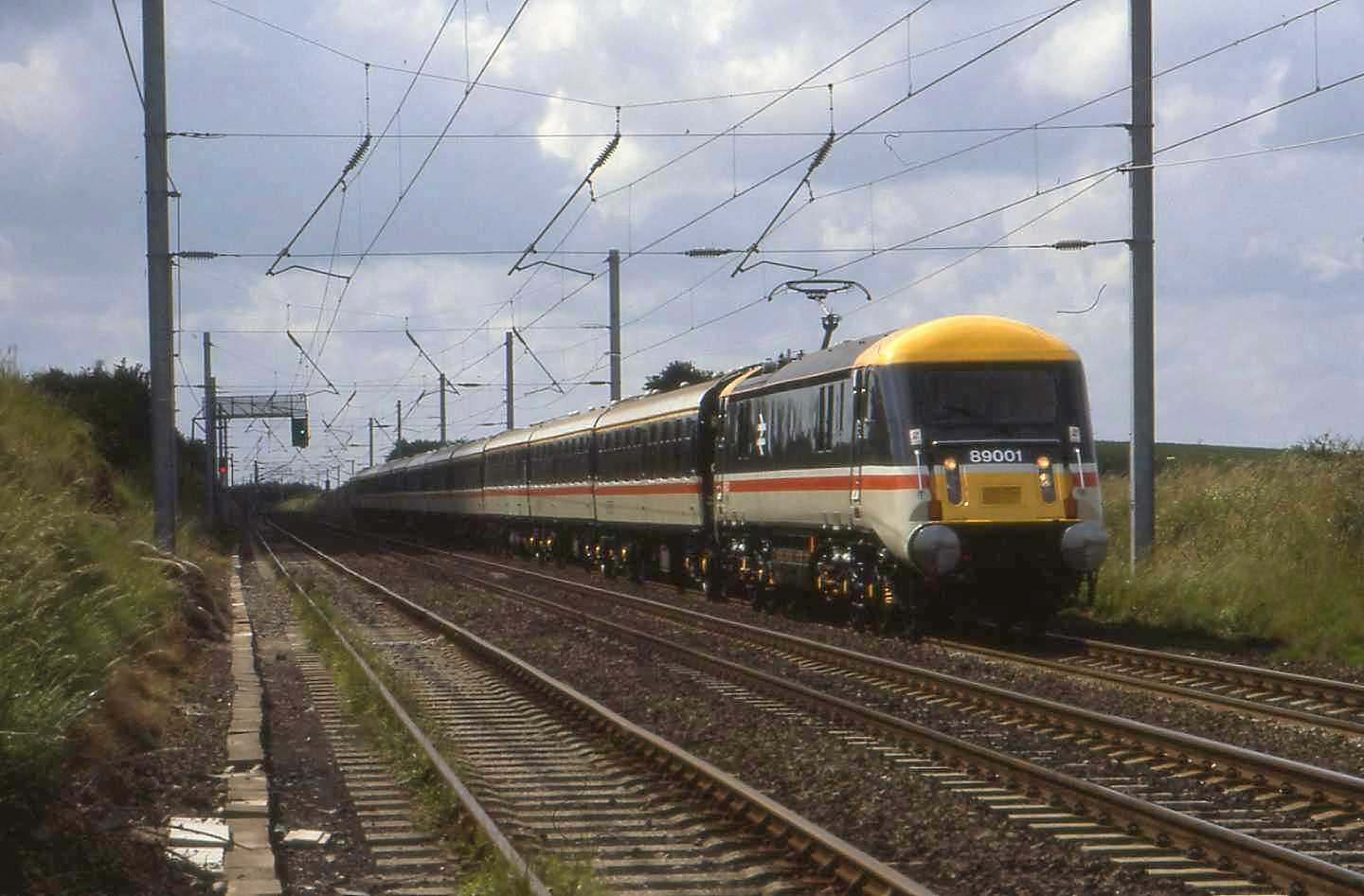
89001 in InterCity Executive livery at Eaton Crossing

The specification for the locomotive was laid out in mid-1981, which then went out to tender in April 1982. The contract to build the locomotive was awarded to Brush in June 1983, with British Rail Engineering Limited's (BREL) Crewe Works as the nominated subcontractor. Delivery was planned for September 1985.

The locomotive was built in 1986, being initially delivered to Derby Litchurch Lane Works on 2 October 1986. The Class 89 was then transferred by road to Brush Traction at Loughborough, for static testing and commissioning.

The locomotive was taken to Crewe Electric TMD on 9 February 1987; the following day, it first ran under its own power, inside the depot perimeter. The first lone run on the main line was on 20 February 1987. On 6 March 1987, the locomotive visited the Railway Technical Centre for weighing and other tests. 89001 was moved to the Old Dalby Test Track for evaluation and pantograph tuning on 13 April 1987. The locomotive was initially allocated to Crewe Electric depot for trials along the West Coast Main Line. Main line running between Crewe, Willesden TMD and Carlisle was performed with the BREL International rake of Mark 3 coaches, along with measurement coaches. Following successful testing, 89001 was transferred to Hornsey TMD on 9 December 1987, having been run for 11,500 mi (18,500 km) by that point. The locomotive was later transferred to Bounds Green TMD for passenger services on the East Coast Main Line. In May 1988, the locomotive returned to Old Dalby for braking trials. On 22 May 1988, 89001 along with a Class 90, Class 91 and Class 150 left for Hamburg for display at the International Traffic and Transport Exhibition; it returned on 17 June.

On 3 July 1988, the locomotive hauled the Mallard 50th anniversary special from London King's Cross, along with the return journey. It began regular passenger service from King's Cross to Peterborough on 15 July 1988. As the development of the ECML electrification continued, the engine was painted into the new style InterCity Swallow livery and named Avocet, in recognition of the Royal Society for the Protection of Birds (RSPB), by prime minister Margaret Thatcher on 16 January 1989 at King's Cross station. After the ceremony, the locomotive hauled a special train conveying the RSPB's president Magnus Magnusson, along with other VIPs, to Sandy. Passenger use continued on the ECML until 5 March 1989, a week before the Class 91s entered service on the diagrams.

The locomotive suffered a serious failure and was withdrawn from traffic in July 1992. At the time, it was still owned by British Rail and Brush had no contractual obligation with regard to it. Additionally, having received no orders from BR in return for their design investment, there was little incentive for Brush to construct spare parts for it. BR had written off the locomotive financially, as part of the ECML development; it was therefore seen as surplus and of nil value as an asset. As such, the locomotive was sidelined.

It was saved for preservation at the Midland Railway Centre by a group of Brush Traction employees. During this period of ownership, the locomotive appeared at every major British Rail depot open day, in a slowly deteriorating InterCity Swallow livery.

=== Legacy ===
The expectation was that the Class 89 design would be used for electric locomotives for the Channel Tunnel and some investigation was undertaken. It was also hoped that it would be a viable replacement for Classes 81, 82, 83 and 85; however, an upgraded version of the Class 87 was ordered instead, as the Class 90.

Ultimately, only technology and ideas from 89001's internal design were used in the Eurotunnel Class 9 locomotives; some similarity in electronics lives on today in the Class 92 locomotive design. Brush did eventually win the contracts to build Channel Tunnel locomotives; similarities between these and 89001 enabled suitable spare parts to be constructed.

== GNER ownership ==
In 1996, as part of the privatisation of British Rail, the InterCity East Coast franchise was won by Great North Eastern Railway (GNER). Suffering from a motive power shortage, its parent company, Sea Containers, purchased 89001 and repaired it for use on London to Leeds and Bradford Forster Square services, investing £100,000 in an overhaul. It was also repainted into GNER's blue and orange livery. The locomotive returned to service in March 1997. However, in October 2000, the locomotive suffered another major failure and was withdrawn from traffic. Its future was in doubt again and it was stored at Doncaster Works. It was moved to Bounds Green TMD in December 2001, for use as a depot generator, before returning to Doncaster.

In December 2004, the locomotive was moved into the care of the AC Locomotive Group at Barrow Hill Roundhouse for secure storage. With the overhaul of the Class 91 fleet completed, along with the availability of Class 373 trains for lease, 89001 was seen again as a one-off asset with little economic value.

== Preservation ==
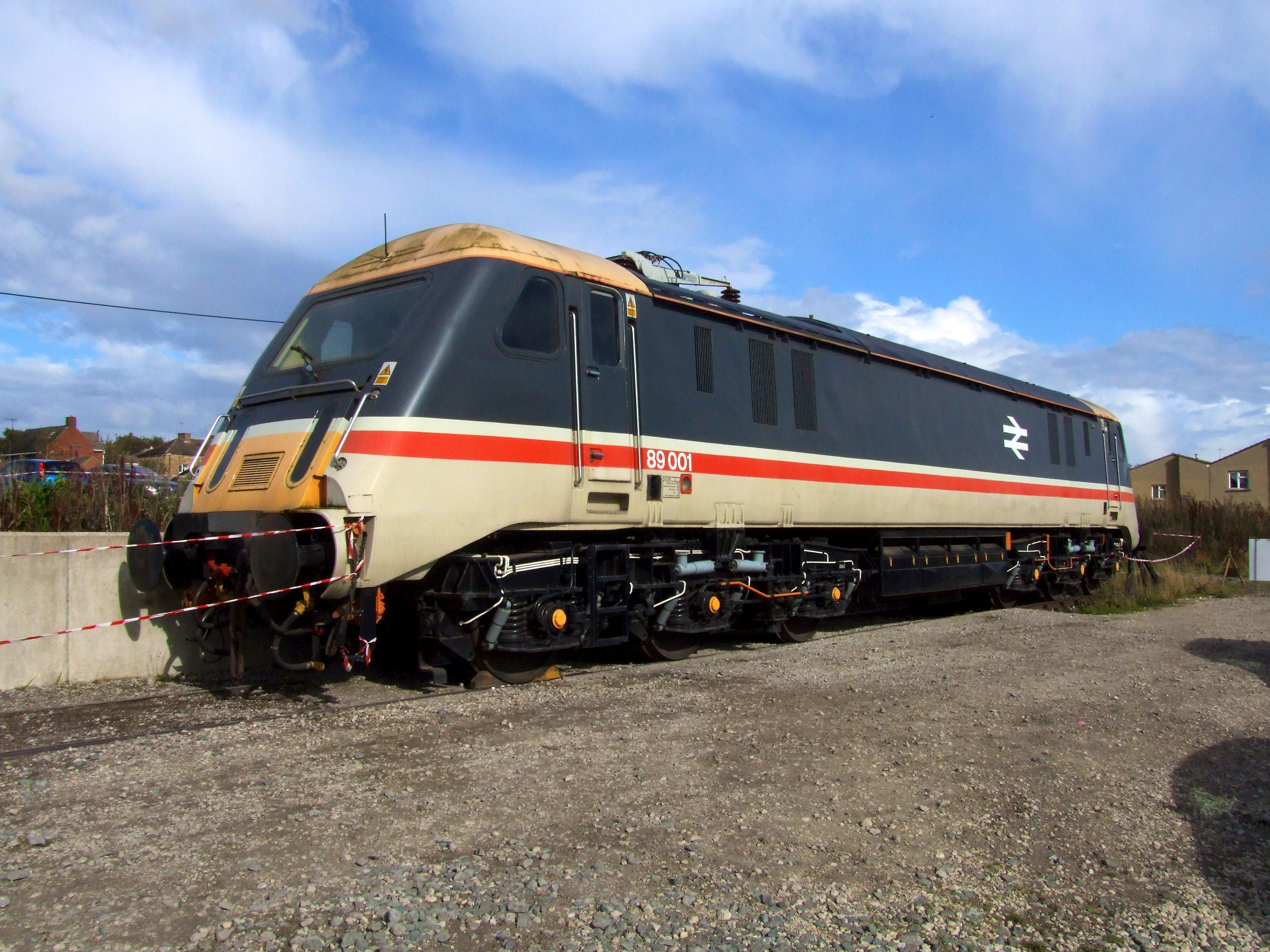
89001 at Barrow Hill in 2011

In October 2006, GNER put 89001 up for sale, with a six-week deadline for bids. The AC Locomotive Group launched an appeal and fundraising effort to save the locomotive, which was ultimately successful; it was purchased in December 2006. The locomotive was mostly complete, although a number of major components required expensive overhaul before it could run on the main line again. A thorough survey was undertaken to establish exactly what was required and costs drawn up.

Cosmetic work in 2007 saw the locomotive return to its original InterCity Executive colour scheme. Electrical restoration work focused on repairing and/or refurbishing the items that led to the locomotive being withdrawn from service, namely the traction motors and their associated field converter electronics. It was lifted by the Harry Needle Railroad Company at Barrow Hill in December 2010 and three traction motors were removed, including the one known to be faulty. In February 2011, these were being examined at Bowers to allow repair cost estimates to be made. Two of the field converters were removed, with one being faulty, and repair estimates were sought again. Initially it was intended, as funds became available, to allow one power group (i.e. one bogie) to become fully operational.

On 30 April 2020, the locomotive was moved from Barrow Hill to Toton TMD to be repainted; it was outshopped in InterCity Swallow livery.

In October 2020, it was hauled to Soho TMD for testing. In December 2021, the AC Locomotive Group announced it had formed a new partnership with Locomotive Services Limited (LSL) that would see the remaining tasks in the overhaul completed and 89001 returned to the main line. The overhaul was completed in 2025 and a series of main line test runs between Crewe and Stafford were made in September 2025.

== Models ==
The Class 89 has been made as a kit and as a ready-to-run model in OO gauge by Silver Fox Models.

In 2020, Accurascale announced its intention to manufacture a ready-to-run model in OO gauge, to be sold as a Rails of Sheffield exclusive model.

== Other uses of Class 89 ==
Since 1989, numbers in the Class 89 range have been used to register preserved main line-accredited diesel and electric locomotives, except shunters, on TOPS and its successor systems. These locomotives can continue to display their historic numbers, but are identified in industry data systems by their 89xxx identity.
