= AL4 =

AL4 may refer to:

- AL4, a postcode district in the AL postcode area
- British Rail Class 84
