= Willesden Traction Maintenance Depot =

Railway traction maintenance depot in north London, England

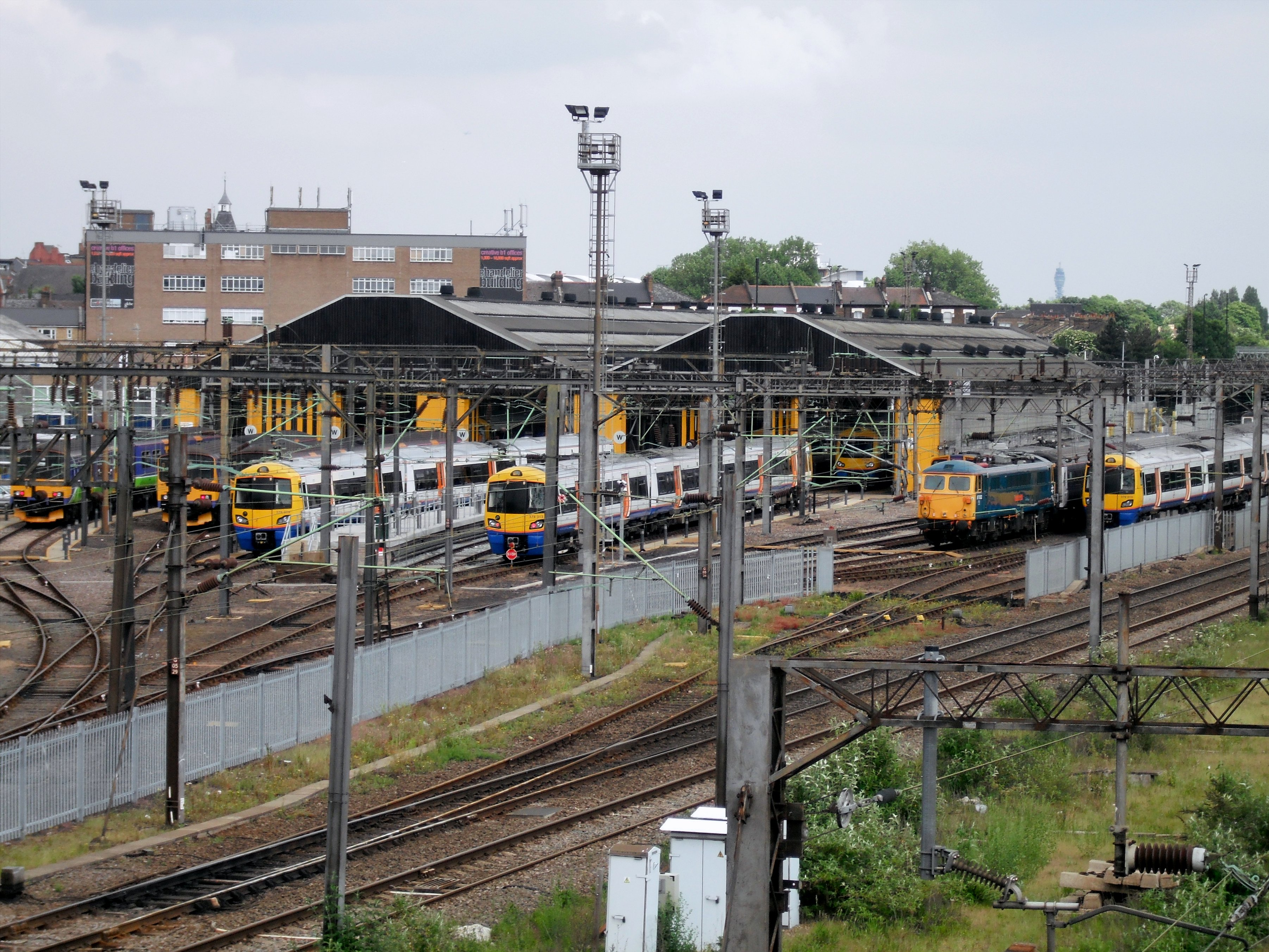
- London Overground units and a Class 87 at Willesden TMD.
- Interactive map of Willesden Traction Maintenance Depot

Location
- Location: Willesden, London, England
- Coordinates: 51.5312°N 0.2397°W
- OS grid: TQ220828

Characteristics
- Owner: Alstom
- Depot code: WN (1973-)
- Type: Electric

History
- Original: British Rail
- BR region: London Midland Region
- Former depot code: 1A (until 1973)

Willesden Traction Maintenance Depot (TMD) is a railway locomotive and electric multiple unit traction maintenance depot, situated in Harlesden, north London. The depot is situated next to the West Coast Main Line, to the south-east of Willesden Junction station and on the way into London Euston station. The depot code is WN.

== History ==
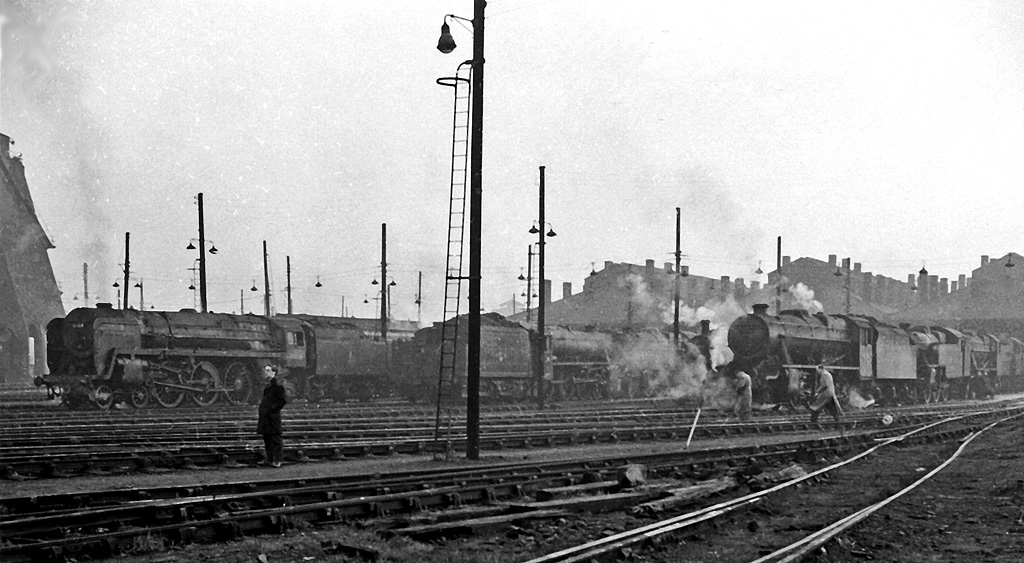
The original Willesden Locomotive Depot in November 1962

The original locomotive servicing facility at Willesden was on the south side of the West Coast Main Line to the west of the station. It closed in 1965. It was replaced by the present facility that opened in March 1965. After the privatisation of British Rail, it was operated by Silverlink. In November 2016 it was taken over by Bombardier (now part of Alstom) as part of its 35 year contract to maintain the Class 710s.

== Shed layout ==
The current depot was designed in the 1960s to service electric locomotive classes AL1 to AL6 (TOPS classes 81, 82, 83, 84, 85 and 86); subsequently, in the early 1970s, Class 87s were included. It consists of six parallel shed roads, each holding four locomotives inside the shed, and several arrivals and departure sidings externally. There is also a road that runs round to the north of the shed, which provides access to the fuel siding; for many years, this was used only for the occasional fuelling of diesel shunters and also to the DC lines of Willesden Junction Low Level station, which is used to move multiple units from the shed onto the North London Line after servicing.

The arrival and departure sidings contain two connections to the West Coast Main Line onto the up slow line. At the east end of the depot, there is a trailing crossover to permit access onto the down slow line when coming off depot.

== Facilities ==
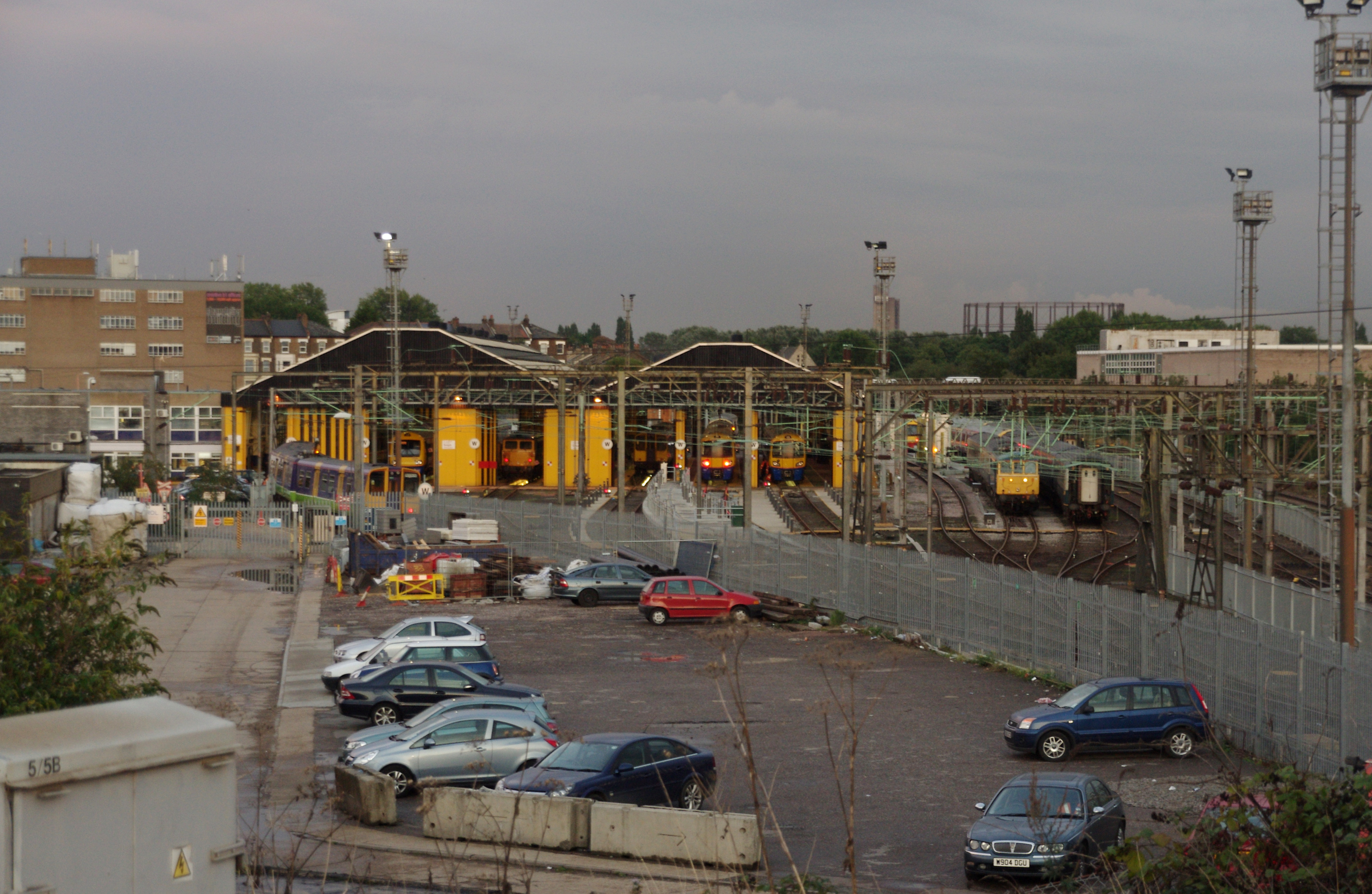
The depot as viewed from the westbound North London line platform at Willesden Junction.

These include offices, a workshop and reasonably large stores. The workshop contains high quality facilities for pantograph overhaul, tap-changer overhaul and brake equipment test and servicing.

In more recent years, especially since the loss of AC electric locomotives, the fuel siding was promoted to other train operators as a facility at Willesden and a means to generate some revenue, this meant for instance that Gospel Oak to Barking line DMUs did not need to travel to Bletchley TMD and back each night for 'A' examinations and fuelling which could instead be carried out at Willesden.

== Allocation ==
- Class 09
- Class 378
- Class 710

=== Previously allocated classes ===
- Class 82
- Class 83
- Class 86
- Class 87

== See also ==
- List of British Railways shed codes
