= AL2 =

AL2 may refer to:

- AL2, a postcode district in the AL postcode area
- British Rail Class 82

== See also ==
- Futurama#Language
