= AL3 =

AL3 may refer to:

- AL3, a postcode district in the AL postcode area
- British Rail Class 83
