= AL5 =

AL5 may refer to:

- AL5, a postcode district in the AL postcode area
- British Rail Class 85
