= AC Locomotive Group =

British electric locomotive preservation society

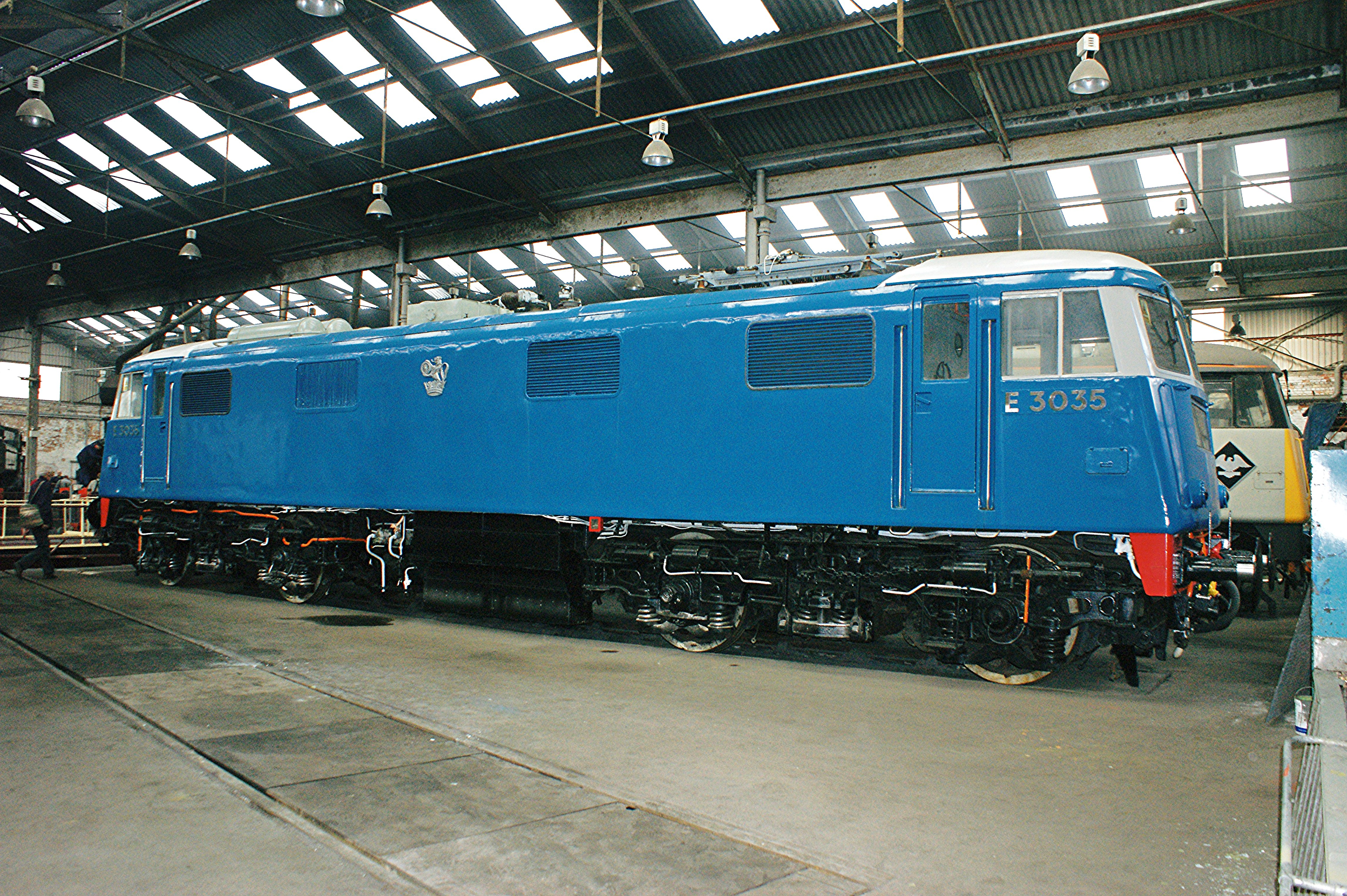
83012 at Barrow Hill Roundhouse (August 2008)

The AC Locomotive Group is a dedicated preservation society for AC electric locomotives in England. It has five locomotives in its ownership: 81002, 82008, 83012, 85006 and 89001.

== History ==
=== Locomotives ===
In 1996, Pete Waterman, who had purchased the sole surviving examples of AC electric locomotive classes 81, 82, 83 and 85, put his entire fleet of locomotives for sale. The AC Locomotive Group (ACLG) was formed with the intention of purchasing all four machines. This was accomplished in June 1997 and three of the four locomotives were moved to Barrow Hill Roundhouse in December 1998, with the fourth joining them in early 2000. Between 2000 and 2008, the group hosted 84001 on loan from the National Railway Museum; this was given a major cosmetic overhaul following a long period stored in the open.

In 2002, leasing company HSBC Rail UK placed 86213 on loan to the group while, in 2004, 86401 was purchased. The same year, GNER placed 89001 into the group's care following closure of part of Doncaster Works, where it had been stored out of use.

In 2005, the ACLG was honoured by the naming of 87002 as The AC Locomotive Group. This was owned by Porterbrook and painted in its purple colour scheme; it later became the last Class 87 to haul a passenger train in regular service. Also in 2005, the group purchased 86101 and 86213.

At the end of 2006, GNER put 89001 up for sale; following a high-profile appeal, the ACLG successfully purchased the locomotive for preservation. In 2008, the group acquired the locomotive that carried its name, 87002, for preservation. For four months in early 2008, 86101 operated services from London King's Cross to Doncaster hauling Cargo-D Mark 3s, under hire to First Hull Trains. In February 2016, 86213 was sold for export to Bulgaria.

Main line operator Electric Traction Limited hired 86101, 86401 and 87002 for use on Caledonian Sleeper services between London Euston and Edinburgh Waverley/Glasgow Central between 2015 and 2019. After this work ceased in May 2019, 86101 and 87002 were sold to Locomotive Services and 86401 to West Coast Railways.

=== Restoration ===
The ACLG made great strides to restore electrical equipment in their early locomotives; early successes included the restoration of auxiliary equipment, including cooling fans, in locomotives 82008 and 83012. In 2006, 81002 was completed electrically to a condition where it could be powered up from the overhead wires.

Most locomotives in the collection have received full cosmetic overhauls since acquisition, with both 82008 and 85101 receiving fictitious makeovers for various periods. By June 2020, 89001 was in the final stages of an overhaul to return it to main line operation.

In December 2021, the group announced it had formed a new partnership with Locomotive Services Limited (LSL) that would see the remaining tasks in the overhaul completed and 89001 returned to the main line. The overhaul was completed in 2025 and a series of main line test runs between Crewe and Stafford was made in September 2025.

== Gallery ==
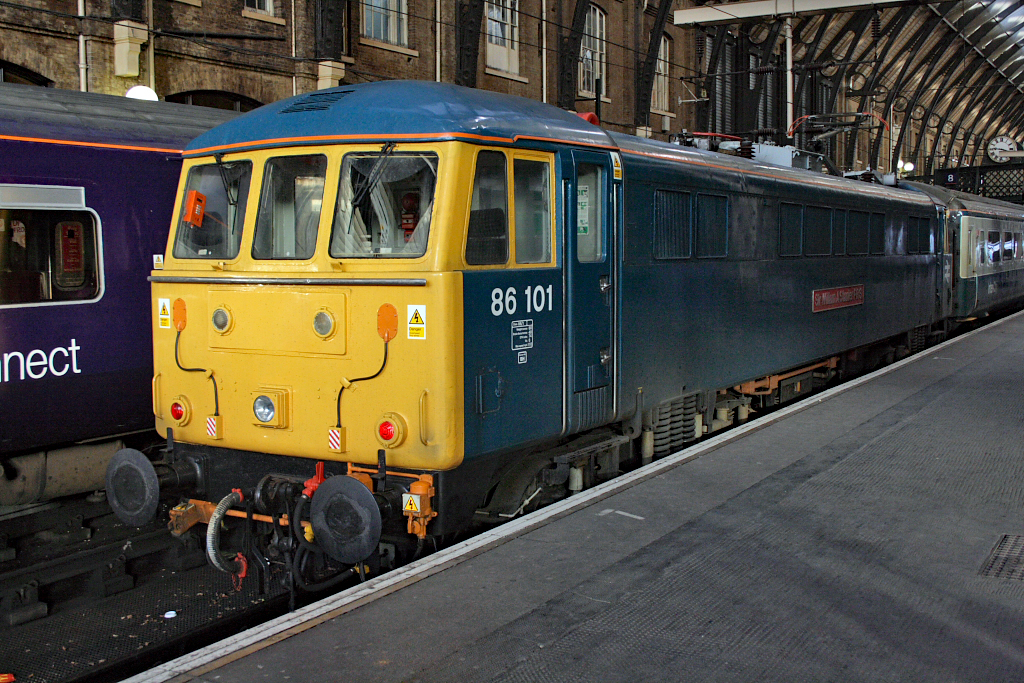
86101 at London King's Cross (January 2008)

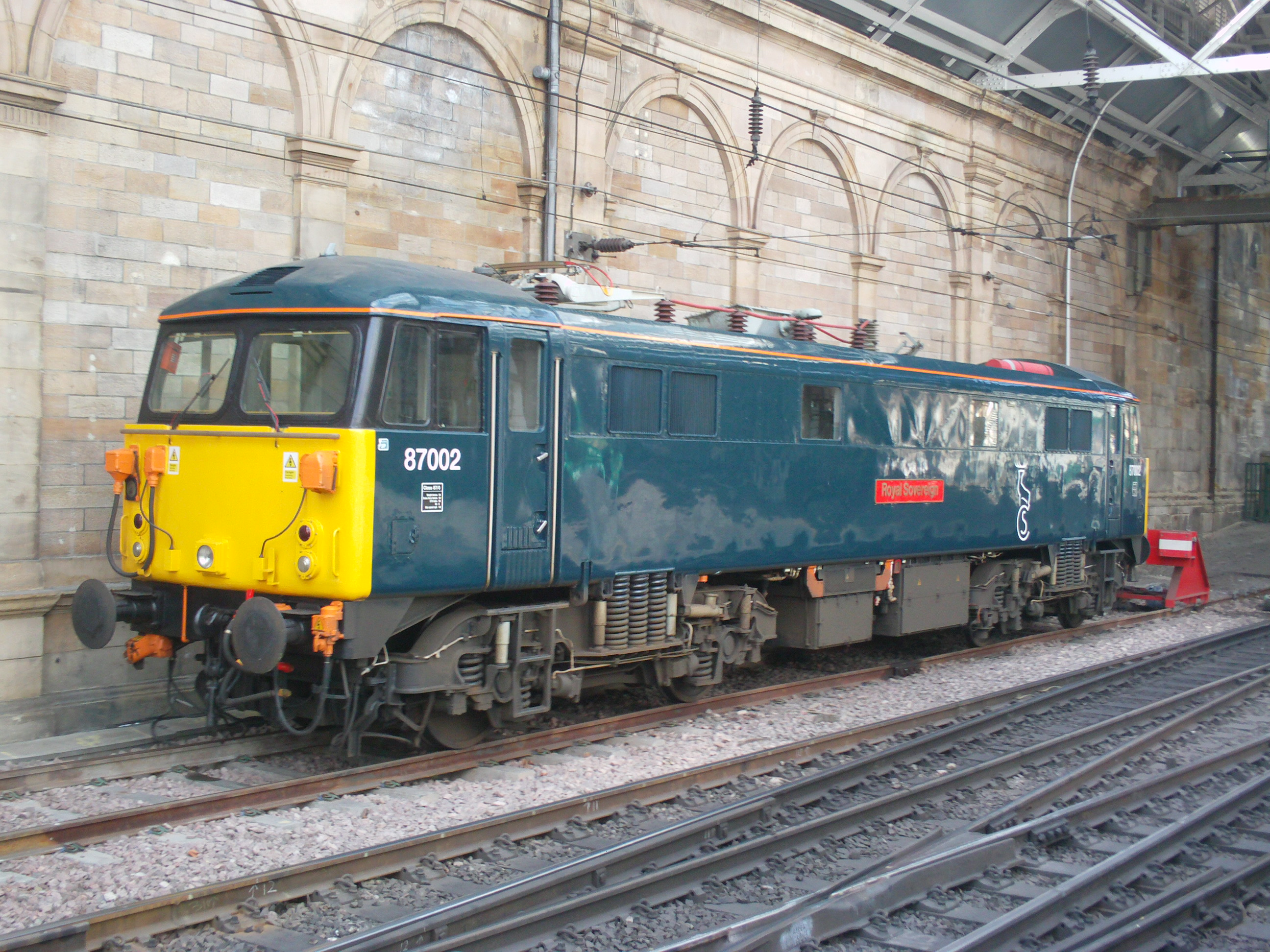
87002 in Caledonian Sleeper livery at Edinburgh Waverley (May 2015)

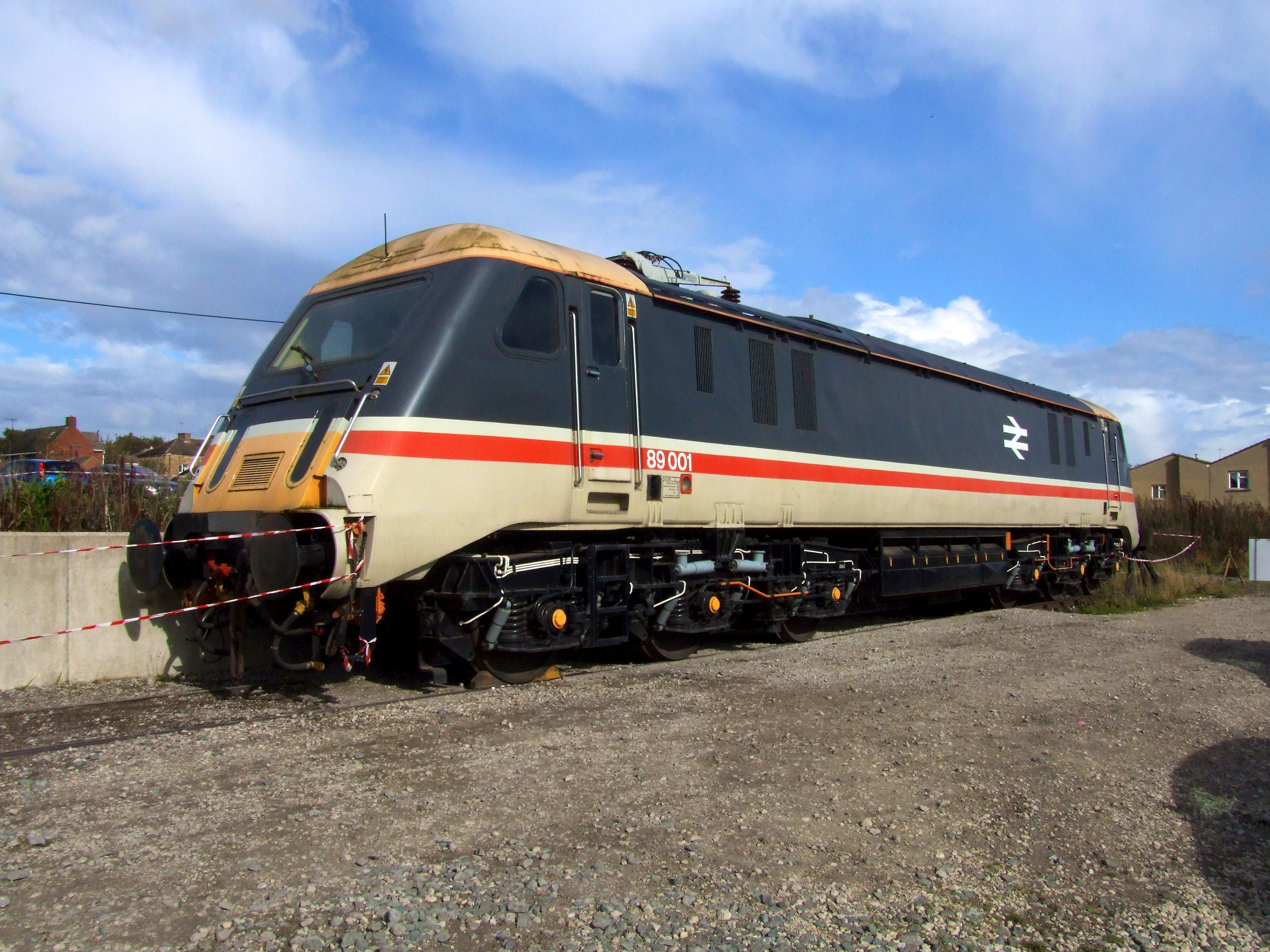
89001 at Barrow Hill Roundhouse (September 2011)
