= British Rail Class 85 =

Class of British electric locomotives

British Railways AL5 British Rail Class 85
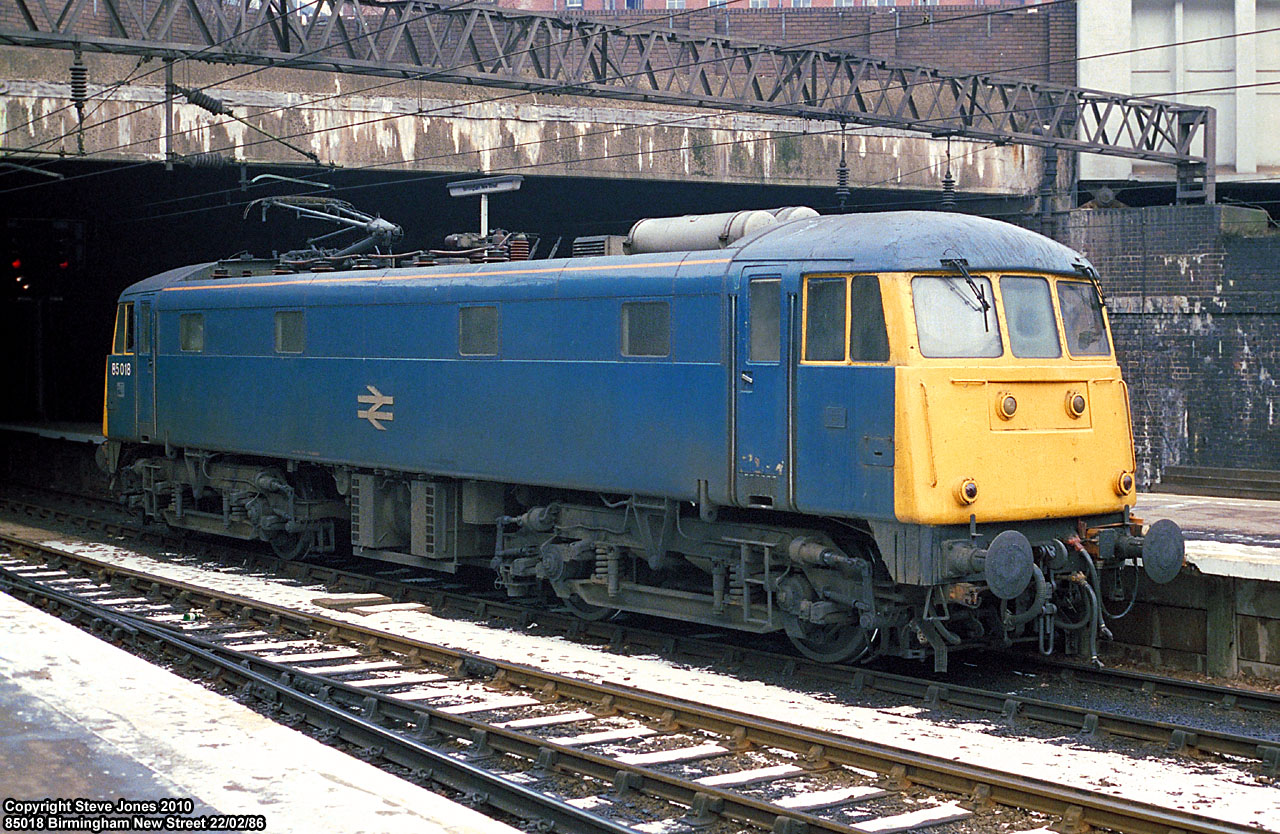
- 85018 at Birmingham New Street in 1986
Type and origin
- Power type: Electric
- Builder: British Railways Doncaster Works
- Build date: 1961–1964
- Total produced: 40
Specifications
- Configuration
  - UIC: Bo′Bo′
  - Commonwealth: Bo-Bo
- Gauge: 4 ft 8 1/2 in (1,435 mm) standard gauge
- Wheel diameter: 4 ft 0 in (1.22 m)
- Minimum curve: 264 ft 0 in (80 m)
- Wheelbase: 42 ft 3 in (12.88 m)
  - Bogie: 10 ft 9 in (3.28 m)
- Pivot centres: 31 ft 6 in (9.60 m)
- Length: 56 ft 6 in (17.22 m) over buffers
- Width: 8 ft 8 1/4 in (2.648 m)
- Height
  - Pantograph: 13 ft 0 9/16 in (3.977 m)
  - Body height: 12 ft 4 1/4 in (3.766 m)
- Axle load: 20.9 t (20.6 LT; 23.0 ST)
- Loco weight: 80 t (79 LT; 88 ST)
- Electric system/s: 25 kV 50 Hz AC overhead
- Current pickups: Pantograph (Stone-Faiveley AMBR)
- Traction motors: 4 × AEI Type 189
  - Continuous: 700 A per motor
- Gear ratio: 29:76
- Train heating: Electric Train Supply, index 66 (320 kW at 800 V AC)
- Loco brake: Air and rheostatic
- Train brakes: Air and vacuum
Performance figures
- Maximum speed: 85/0: 100 mph (160 km/h); 85/1: 80 mph (130 km/h)
- Power output
  - Continuous: 3,200 hp (2,400 kW) at rails
- Tractive effort
  - Starting: 50,000 lb_{f} (220 kN)
  - Continuous: 17,000 lb_{f} (76 kN) at 71 mph (114 km/h)
- Brakeforce: 67.3% of loco weight (inc. rheostatic brake)
Career
- Operators: British Rail
- Numbers: E3056–E3095; later 85001–85040
- Axle load class: Route Availability 6
- Retired: 1981–1992
- Disposition: One preserved, remainder scrapped
- Specifications as at December 1986 except where otherwise noted.

The British Rail Class 85 (also known by the designation AL5) is an electric locomotive that was designed and produced at British Rail’s (BR) Doncaster Works during the early 1960s. While largely developed by BR, much of its systems can be attributed to the British manufacturing interest Associated Electrical Industries (AEI).

The locomotive was developed as a part of the programme of works to electrify the West Coast Main Line during the late 1950s and early 1960s. BR deliberately opted to procure multiple batches of locomotives from a range of manufacturers, leading to the procurement of five prototype classes (Classes 81-85) and subsequently placed a larger order for a refined model of one of these, eventually leading to the development of the Class 86 locomotive.

The Class 85 proved to be a relatively reliable workhorse of the London Midland region, particularly following a refurbishment during the 1970s that saw the replacement of their rectifiers. Some members of the type were in service for thirty years, their withdrawal having commenced during the mid 1980s and lasting into the early 1990s, having been effectively displaced by the arrival of newer types such as the Class 87 and later Class 90. Following the retirement of the Class 85, a single example was preserved.

== Background ==
During the late 1950s, British Rail (BR) embarked upon the electrification of the West Coast Main Line, a strategy which necessitated the procurement of a large number of electric locomotives to utilise the newly-installed infrastructure. A detailed specification, listing various performance attributes for such a locomotive, was produced by the British Transport Commission.

It was decided that, instead of a bulk order from a single manufacturer, several batches of similar locomotives would be ordered from several companies, the first of these being the AL1 series. Further contracts were awarded, including one to BR's own Doncaster Works, to procure a similar locomotive, thus resulting in the Class 85. Under the earlier BR classification, the type was given the designation AL5 (meaning the fifth design of 25 kV AC locomotive), and locomotives were numbered E3056–E3095.

While BR planned had intended for this procurement strategy to have led to work being spread out to a variety of different manufacturers, many of the systems used across the different prototype classes were similar or in some cases identical, having been supplied by the same firm, the Metropolitan-Vickers division of the British manufacturing group Associated Electrical Industries (AEI). Between 1961 and 1964, a total of forty such locomotives were constructed, all of which were built at Doncaster.

== Design ==
The Class 85 is an AC electric locomotive intended for express services on the West Coast Main Line. Its design bore considerable similarities to the earlier British Rail Class 81, particularly in terms of their shared AEI-supplied equipment. One key area of difference was its adoption of semiconductor-based rectifiers and a rheostatic braking system; the latter was viewed as likely to generate considerable cost savings in comparison to conventional braking by reducing wheel wear. A small proportion of the locomotive's equipment, such as the bogies, were designed by the French industrial group Alstom.

In order to achieve the minimal weight requirement stipulated by BR, while still maintaining sufficient structural strength, the lower halves of the body sides were merged into the locomotive's underframe, while the roof and sides above the base of the windows were built from a relatively light steel frame with an aluminium covering. The underframe is a welded steel assembly divided into seven box-like sections, while the bogie frame is built from rolled steel members that were welded together. On the outer faces of the underframe, the coupler and oleo-pneumatic buffers were fitted. The locomotive was seated upon each bogie via a double-ended rubber cone-shaped pivot, the alignment of which was defined by a transverse spring anchorage. Much of the weight was carried by two sets of four spring-loaded side-bearers, which used rubber brushes wherever practical to eliminate the need for lubrication.

The Class 85 featured a sizeable power compartment, of which particular attention was paid to making it as accessible for maintenance purposes as was realistically possible. The bulk of the equipment was installed within two compartments, one containing the rectifier apparatus and the other accommodated the main transformer and associated equipment, while a walkway spanned the length of the power compartment for access purposes. Above the transformer was its roof-mounted radiator and cooling fans, while the braking resistors and motor contactor panel were positioned close by. In between the transformer unit and the rear bulkhead was the brake compressor, primary air reservoir, and the fault indicator panel. On the opposite side of the power compartment, next to the forward bulkhead, was the auxiliary compressor, battery charging apparatus, and a chemical toilet for the locomotive crew.

Power was delivered to the locomotive via overhead catenary, which was always energised at 25,000 V AC. However, the main transformer, which was normally operated with the four windings in series, could be operated at 6.25 kV AC with the transformer windings in parallel. This voltage was intended to be used where limited clearances gave concern over use of the higher voltage arcing onto lineside structures, especially those made of cast iron. Since the clearances were found to be adequate, the lower voltage connections were locked out of use. A standardised Stone-Faiveley AMBR pantograph was adopted for the type, which was raised using pressurised air, the power for which was provided via the battery-powered auxiliary air compressor.

Driver's cabs are provided at both ends of the locomotive. The cabs are of double-skin construction, with a sheet steel exterior around a steel frame, and an inner lining of plastic-faced plywood along with fibreglass mouldings for the ceiling. Asbestos was also applied for its thermal insulation and soundproofing properties; several electric heater units were also present each of the cabs. The driving controls, which conformed to BR's standard conventions of the era, were mounted on a sloped plastic-covered desk directly beneath the forward window; various instruments, light switches, indicators, and gauges lined the centre console. The master controller was to the right of the driver while the air brake controls were to the left.

== Operational history ==
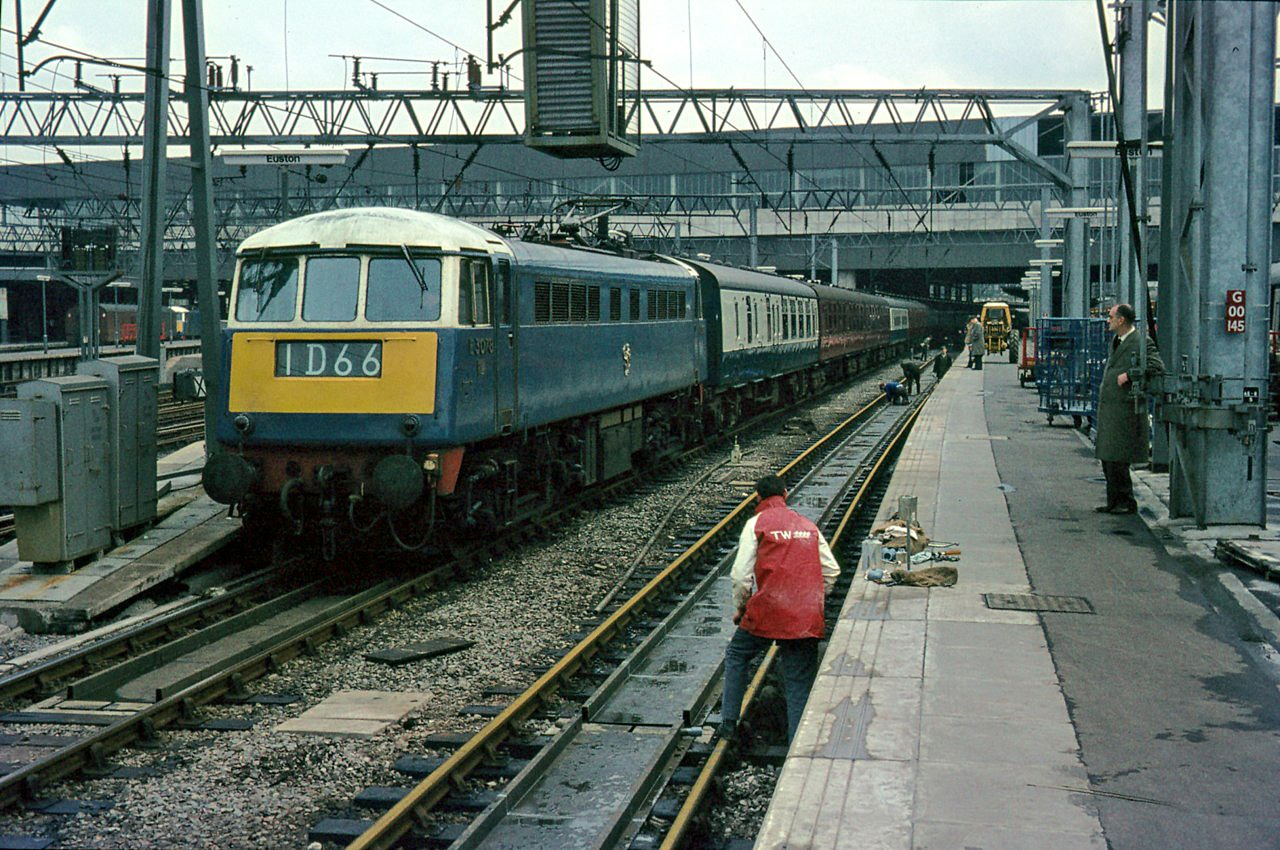
A Class 85 at the front of a train at Euston in 1966, shortly after the introduction of electric services.

Upon their entry to service, the AL5 fleet was used to haul express trains on the then newly electrified West Coast Main Line, from Birmingham, to Crewe, Manchester Piccadilly, Liverpool, and later Preston. By 1965, electrification had spread south to London Euston, allowing for services to be extended shortly thereafter.

The first 30 Class 85 locomotives were built with germanium rectifiers in their power systems, after which the final 10 used silicon-based rectifiers instead. Silicon rectifiers were retrofitted across the whole fleet by the end of 1986.

In 1968, the type was reclassified as Class 85 as a result of BR's introduction of the TOPS numbering system. From 1971 onwards, locomotives were progressively renumbered into the 85001–85040 range. Fourteen locomotives were later converted for freight-only use, numbered in the 85/1 subclass. These locomotives were restricted to 80 mph (129 km/h).

== Accidents and incidents ==
- On 23 April 1983, 85027 caught fire while hauling a southbound intermodal train near Kings Langley. It was not returned to service.
- On 13 October 1985, 85001 caught fire while hauling the 16:15 Euston to Manchester service.
- On 27 April 1989, a passenger train hauled by 85012 was derailed near Northampton.

== Preservation ==
One locomotive has been preserved, 85006, which was previously numbered E3061 and 85101. It is owned by the AC Locomotive Group, which also has examples of Classes 81, 82 and 83 at Barrow Hill Roundhouse. It is painted in BR Blue livery; previously, it had been named to commemorate the 150th anniversary of Doncaster Works and was painted in Railfreight Distribution livery, which was never carried in service. Their long-term intention is to restore this locomotive to working order.

== Fleet details ==
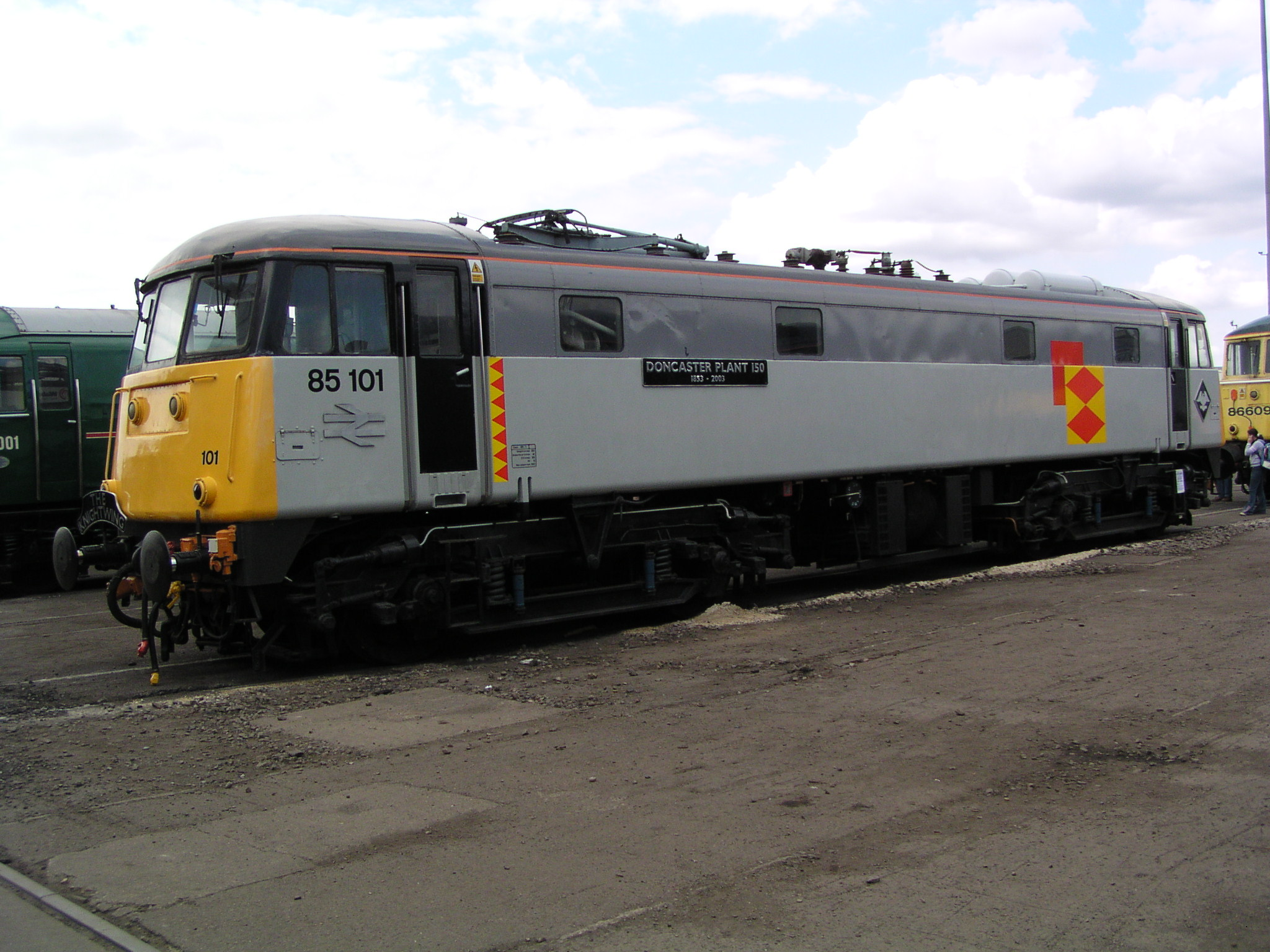
Class 85, no. 85101 Doncaster Plant 150 1853-2003, on display at Doncaster Works open day in 2003

Class	Qty.	Numbers	Withdrawn
85/0	26	85001–85002, 85005, 85008, 85013–85015, 85017–85020, 85022–85023, 85025–85031, 85033–85034, 85037–85040	1985–1991
85/1	14	85101–85114	1990–1992

Key:	Preserved	Scrapped

Numbers			Withdrawn	Disposal
AL5	85/0	85/1	Withdrawn	Disposal
E3056	85001	-	1985	Scrapped at MC Metals, Glasgow
E3057	85002	-	1989	Scrapped at MC Metals, Glasgow
E3058	85003	85113	1991	Scrapped at MC Metals, Glasgow
E3059	85004	85111	1990	Scrapped at MC Metals, Glasgow
E3060	85005	-	1990	Scrapped at MC Metals, Glasgow
E3061	85006	85101	1992	Preserved at Barrow Hill Engine Shed
E3062	85007	85112	1991	Scrapped at MC Metals, Glasgow
E3063	85008	-	1990	Scrapped at MC Metals, Glasgow
E3064	85009	85102	1991	Scrapped at MC Metals, Glasgow
E3065	85010	85103	1991	Scrapped at MC Metals, Glasgow
E3066	85011	85114	1991	Scrapped at MC Metals, Glasgow
E3067	85012	85104	1991	Scrapped at MC Metals, Glasgow
E3068	85013	-	1990	Scrapped at MC Metals, Glasgow
E3069	85014	-	1989	Scrapped at MC Metals, Glasgow
E3070	85015	-	1990	Scrapped at MC Metals, Glasgow
E3071	85016	85105	1991	Scrapped at MC Metals, Glasgow
E3072	85017	-	1987	Scrapped at MC Metals, Glasgow
E3073	85018	-	1991	Scrapped at MC Metals, Glasgow
E3074	85019	-	1989	Scrapped at MC Metals Glasgow
E3075	85020	-	1990	Withdrawn following accident, scrapped at MC Metals, Glasgow
E3076	85021	85106	1990	Scrapped at MC Metals, Glasgow
E3077	85022	-	1989	Scrapped at MC Metals, Glasgow
E3078	85023	-	1990	Scrapped at MC Metals, Glasgow
E3079	85024	85107	1990	Scrapped at MC Metals, Glasgow
E3080	85025	-	1990	Scrapped at MC Metals Glasgow
E3081	85026	-	1990	Scrapped at MC Metals, Glasgow
E3082	85027	-	1983	Withdrawn following fire damage, (Note: Damaged while hauling a southbound intermodal train near Kings Langley on 23 April 1983.) scrapped at MC Metals, Glasgow
E3083	85028	-	1990	Scrapped at MC Metals, Glasgow
E3084	85029	-	1988	Scrapped at MC Metals, Glasgow
E3085	85030	-	1990	Scrapped at MC Metals, Glasgow
E3086	85031	-	1990	Scrapped at MC Metals, Glasgow
E3087	85032	85108	1991	Scrapped at MC Metals, Glasgow
E3088	85033	-	1984	Scrapped at MC Metals Glasgow
E3089	85034	-	1990	Scrapped at MC Metals, Glasgow
E3090	85035	85109	1991	Scrapped at MC Metals, Glasgow
E3091	85036	85110	1991	Scrapped at MC Metals, Glasgow
E3092	85037	-	1990	Scrapped at MC Metals, Glasgow
E3093	85038	-	1990	Scrapped at MC Metals, Glasgow
E3094	85039	-	1987	Scrapped at MC Metals, Glasgow
E3095	85040	-	1991	Scrapped at MC Metals, Glasgow

== Models ==
In 2012, Bachmann introduced OO gauge models of the Class 85 in electric blue and BR blue.
