= British Rail Class 84 =

British class of electric locomotives

British Railways AL4 British Rail Class 84
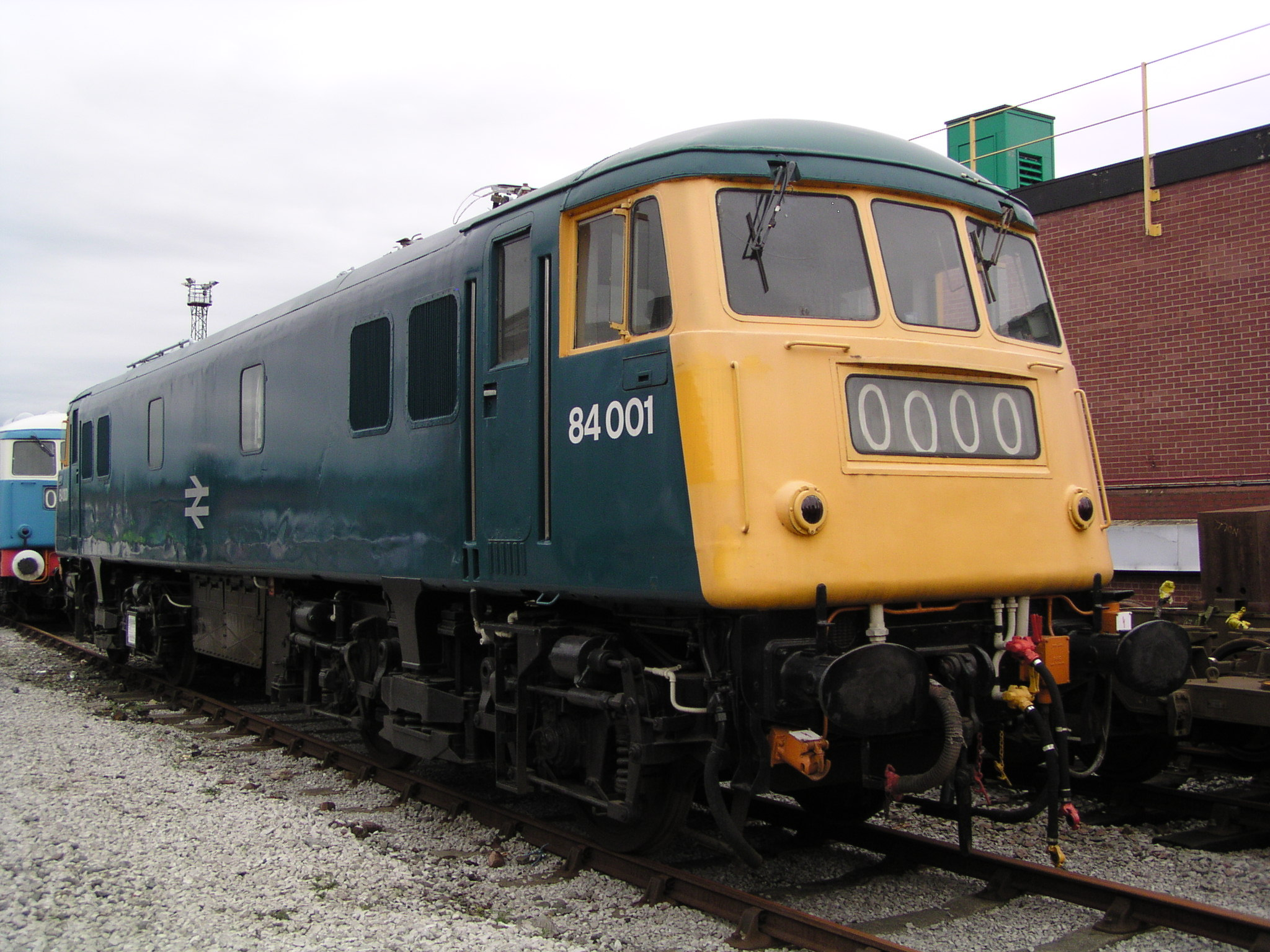
- Preserved locomotive 84001 on display at Crewe Works' open day in 2005
Type and origin
- Power type: Electric
- Builder: North British Locomotive Company
- Order number: L91
- Build date: 1960–1961
- Total produced: 10
Specifications
- Configuration
  - AAR: B-B
  - UIC: Bo′Bo′
  - Commonwealth: Bo-Bo
- Gauge: 4 ft 8 1/2 in (1,435 mm) standard gauge
- Wheel diameter: 4 ft 0 in (1.219 m)
- Wheelbase: 39 ft 6 in (12.04 m)
- Length
  - Over beams: 53 ft 6 1/2 in (16.32 m)
- Width: 8 ft 8 1/4 in (2.648 m)
- Height
  - Pantograph: 13 ft 0 9/16 in (3.977 m)
  - Body height: 12 ft 4 1/4 in (3.766 m)
- Loco weight: 76.60 long tons (77.83 t; 85.79 short tons)
- Electric system/s: 25 kV AC Catenary
- Current pickup: Pantograph
- Traction motors: 4 × GEC WT501
- Gear ratio: 25:74
- Train heating: Electric Train Heating
- Train brakes: Vacuum; Dual from 1972
Performance figures
- Maximum speed: 100 mph (160 km/h)
- Power output
  - 1 hour: 4 × 890 hp (660 kW)
  - Continuous: 4 × 750 hp (560 kW)
- Tractive effort: 50,000 lbf (220 kN)
- Brakeforce: 65.5 long tons-force (653 kN)
Career
- Operators: British Rail
- Numbers: E3036–E3045; later 84001–84010
- Axle load class: Route availability 6
- Retired: 1979–1980
- Disposition: One preserved, nine scrapped

The British Rail Class 84 is a type of 25 kV AC electric locomotives that operated on the West Coast Main Line of the London Midland Region in Great Britain. The ten-strong class was one of five prototype classes of electric locomotives introduced in the early stages of the line's electrification. Built between 1960 and 1961, the type was not a success, as they were beset by technical problems; after several lengthy periods of storage and unsuccessful attempts at resolving these problems, British Rail (BR) withdrew the fleet between 1977 and 1980.

== History ==
As part of the modernisation of the West Coast Main Line (WCML), which included its electrification, 100 locomotives of five types were acquired from different manufacturers. Ten Class AL4 locomotives, numbered E3036-E3045, were built in 1960 by the North British Locomotive Company in Springburn, Glasgow, to a design by GEC.

Locomotive E3040 worked the inaugural AC electric-hauled train from Manchester Piccadilly to Crewe on 12 September 1960.

== Power supply ==
The locomotives always worked on power provided by overhead catenary energised at 25,000 V AC. However, the main transformer, normally operated with the four windings in series, could be operated at 6,250V AC with the transformer windings in parallel. This voltage was initially to be used where limited clearances gave concern over use of the higher voltage. Since the clearances were found to be adequate, the lower voltage connections were locked out of use.

== Service ==
Once in service a number of problems emerged with the class, including rough riding, flashovers in the transformer windings, short lifespans for the motor spring drives and major problems with the mercury-arc rectifiers. In April 1963, the fleet was temporarily taken out of service and was returned to GEC Dukinfield, the builder of the electrical equipment, in an attempt to find a solution; remedial work was carried out.

When the class returned to service, the problems persisted; in 1967, they were placed into storage, using the former steam shed at Bury, along with Class AL3. During this time, E3043 went to the Rugby Testing Centre for trials.

=== Reprieve and rebuilding ===
The persistent problems could have been the end of the ten locomotives of Class 84, but the extension of the WCML electrification to Glasgow Central meant that more electric locomotives would be needed. It was therefore decided that the stored Class AL3 and AL4 locomotives would be repaired, at Doncaster Works, and returned to service.

After spending five years in storage, all ten locomotives were rebuilt with silicon rectifiers and dual brakes in 1972; they were reclassified under TOPS as Class 84, being renumbered 84001–84010.

== Withdrawal ==
The second rebuild overcame some of the previous problems; however, new problems emerged involving traction motor failures, caused in part by the long period they had spent in storage, and the class continued to give trouble in service. By the mid-1970s, having already spent a substantial amount of money on them, BR could not justify any further investment in the fleet, especially since the recently introduced Class 87s allowed them to be sidelined. The decision was taken to withdraw them from service; 84005 and 84007 were the first to go in April 1977, with the last being 84003 and 84010 in 1980.

== After withdrawal ==
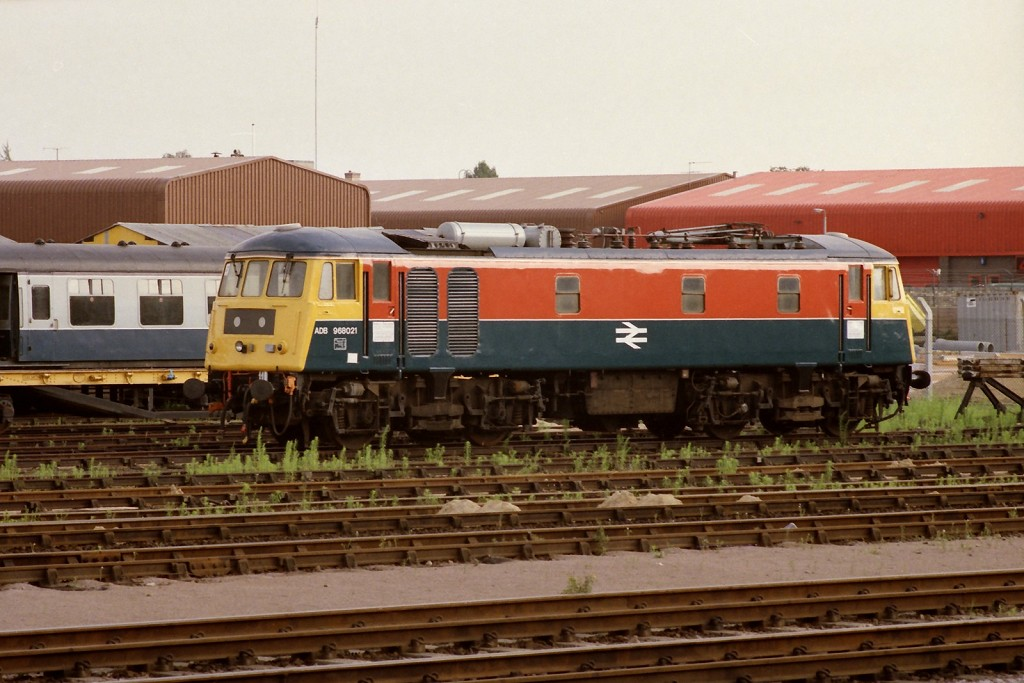
ADB968021 (ex-84009) load bank tester (1987)

Several locomotives were initially saved from scrap:

- 84001 was donated to the National Railway Museum, in York, for preservation
- 84002 and 84010 were returned to GEC for a proposed scheme to use them as new-technology test bed locomotives; however, this project never materialised and both were scrapped in December 1982
- 84009 saw further use in a new guise; it passed to the British Rail Research Division and was rebuilt as an unpowered mobile load bank tester. It was used to test the power supply to new and upgraded overhead line equipment; it was renumbered ADB968021. In 1992, it was withdrawn from service and was scrapped in 1995
- 84003 was saved, to be used as a source of spares for 84009 and for possible conversion to departmental use; however, it was scrapped in 1986.

== Preservation ==
One locomotive (84001) has been preserved in the National Collection at the National Railway Museum. This was initially meant to be temporary; the locomotive was to be exchanged at a later date for a more representative example of WCML electric traction such as a Class 86 or Class 87.

84001 has been out on two loans:

- Between 2000 and 2012, it was loaned to the AC Locomotive Group at Barrow Hill Roundhouse where it was given a major cosmetic overhaul, following a long period stored in the open
- It moved subsequently to the Museum of Scottish Railways, at the Bo'ness and Kinneil Railway, and was returned to York in 2023.

A cab from 84009 was saved from the scrapyard in 1995. Together with many spares from the other end of the locomotive, it was moved to Milton Keynes for restoration.

== Fleet details ==
Key:	Preserved	Scrapped

Numbers			Date Introduced	Withdrawn	Disposal
Pre-TOPS	TOPS	NBL Works No.	Date Introduced	Withdrawn	Disposal
E3036	84001	27793	March 1960	22 January 1979	Preserved by the National Railway Museum.
E3037	84002	27794	May 1960	September 1980	Scrapped at Texas Metals, Hyde
E3038	84003	27795	June 1960	November 1980	To BR Research Department. Scrapped at Vic Berry, Leicester
E3039	84004	27796	July 1960	12 November 1977	Scrapped at Birds, Long Marston
E3040	84005	27797	August 1960	20 April 1977	Scrapped at Birds, Long Marston
E3041	84006	27798	October 1960	January 1978	Scrapped by J Cashmore at Crewe Yard
E3042	84007	27799	October 1960	April 1977	Scrapped by J Cashmore at Crewe Yard
E3043	84008	27800	December 1960	October 1979	Scrapped at Crewe Works
E3044	84009	27801	December 1960	3 August 1978	To BR Research Department. Scrapped at Gwent Demolition, Margam. One cab preserved.
E3045	84010	27802	March 1961	November 1980	Scrapped at Texas Metals, Hyde
