= British Rail Class 82 =

British class of electric locomotives

British Railways AL2 British Rail Class 82
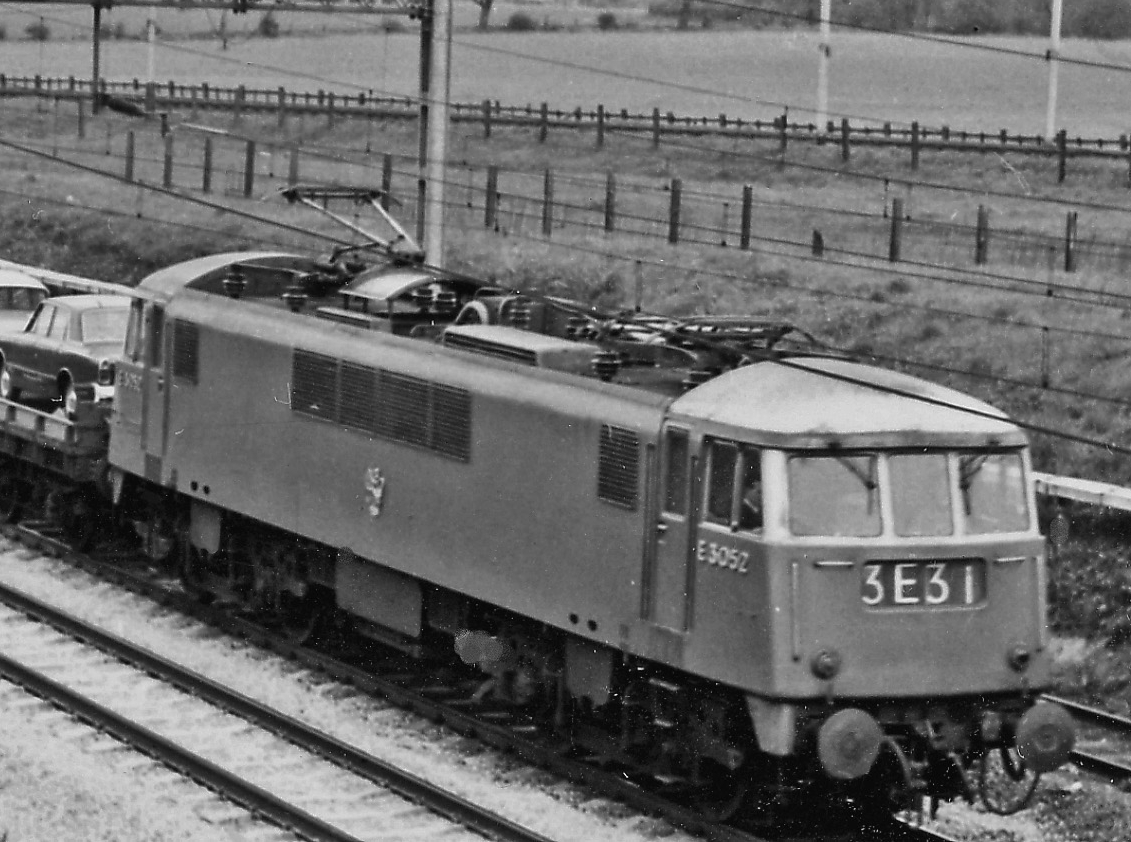
- E3052 at Hartford Junction in 1965
Type and origin
- Power type: Electric
- Designer: Metropolitan-Vickers
- Builder: Beyer, Peacock & Co. Ltd.
- Build date: 1960–1962
- Total produced: 10
Specifications
- Configuration
  - AAR: B-B
  - UIC: Bo′Bo′
  - Commonwealth: Bo-Bo
- Gauge: 4 ft 8 1/2 in (1,435 mm) standard gauge
- Wheel diameter: 4 ft 0 in (1.219 m)
- Wheelbase: 40 ft 9 in (12.42 m)
- Length: 56 ft 0 in (17.07 m)
- Width: 8 ft 9 in (2.67 m)
- Height
  - Pantograph: 13 ft 0 9/16 in (3.977 m)
- Loco weight: 79.70 long tons (81.0 t; 89.3 short tons)
- Electric system/s: 6.25 kV AC / 25 kV AC (as built); 25 kV AC Catenary (modified)
- Current pickups: 2 × Stone-Faiveley ‘V’-type pantograph (as built); 1 × Stone-Faiveley ‘V’-type pantograph (modified); E3055: 2 × AEI cross-arm pantograph
- Traction motors: 4 × 847 hp (632 kW) Metropolitan-Vickers 189Z
- Transmission: Quill drive
- Train heating: Electric Train Heating
- Loco brake: Davies and Metcalfe Air braking system
- Train brakes: Vacuum, Dual from 1971–1972
Performance figures
- Maximum speed: 100 mph (161 km/h)
- Power output: 3,300 hp (2,460 kW)
- Tractive effort: 50,000 lbf (222,000 N)
- Brakeforce: 63 long tons-force (628 kN)
Career
- Operators: British Rail
- Numbers: E3046–E3055; later 82001–82008
- Axle load class: Route availability 6
- Retired: 1969 (1), 1971 (1), 1983 (6), 1987 (2)
- Disposition: One preserved, remainder scrapped

The British Rail Class 82 (AL2 under the pre-TOPS classification scheme) electric locomotives were designed by the British manufacturing interest Metropolitan-Vickers and produced by Beyer, Peacock and Company on behalf of British Rail (BR).

The locomotive was developed as a part of the programme of works to electrify the West Coast Main Line during the late 1950s and early 1960s. BR deliberately opted to procure multiple small batches of locomotives from a range of manufacturers. Having selected a proposal by the Metropolitan-Vickers division of the British manufacturing holding company Associated Electrical Industries (AEI), the Class 82 would be produced. A total of ten locomotives were built by Beyer, Peacock and Company between 1960 and 1962.

The Class 82 proved to be a relatively reliable workhorse of the region, particularly following a refurbishment during the 1970s that saw the replacement of their rectifiers. The fleet served in their original capacity for roughly twenty years, being mostly withdrawn during the early 1980s following the arrival of newer types such as the Class 87. Following the final retirement of the Class 82 in 1987, a single example was preserved.

== Background ==
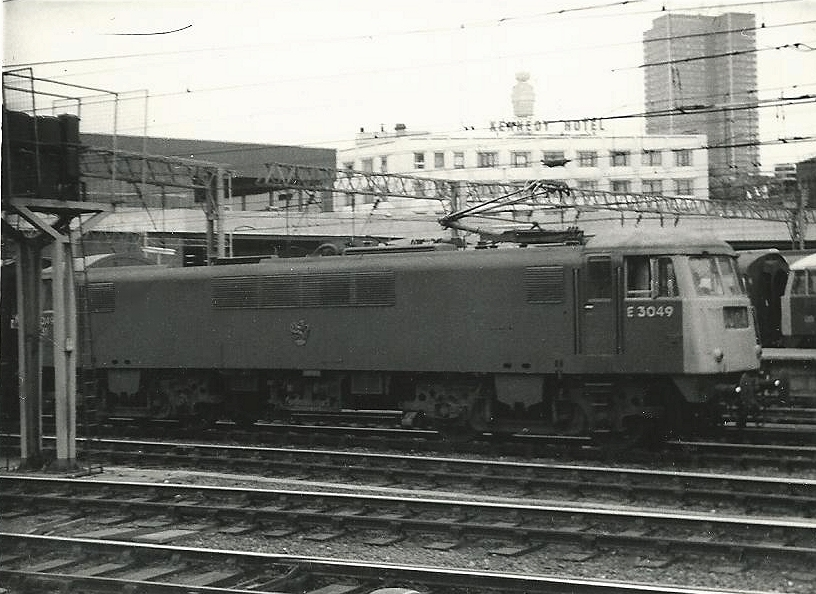
E3049 at Euston in 1966

During the late 1950s, BR embarked upon the electrification of the West Coast Main Line, a strategy which necessitated the procurement of a large number of electric locomotives to utilise the newly installed infrastructure. It was decided that, instead of a bulk order from a single manufacturer, several batches of similar locomotives would be ordered from several companies, the first of these being the AL1 series. Accordingly, it was decided to order the second batch, which was initially classified as the AL2, to a broadly similar role to the preceding model. Following a review of competitive bids, it was decided to award a contract for ten locomotives to the Metropolitan-Vickers division of the British manufacturing holding company AEI.

Responsibility for the locomotive's design was with AEI, which produced much of the mechanical design in-house. While the design phase was worked on in-house, the company opted to subcontract the construction phase to Beyer, Peacock and Company, which produced all locomotives at their works in Gorton, Manchester. A total of ten examples were produced; the type being classified as AL2 under the pre-TOPS classification scheme, each locomotive was originally numbered E3046 - E3055.

Midway through the manufacturing phase, it was realised that the locomotive would be considerably heavier than had been anticipated. In response, some elements were rapidly redesigned so that it could still confirm with the requirements laid out by the corresponding British Transport Commission specification. These late-stage design modifications included the replacement of heavy sections with lighter alternatives, such as an aluminium body and fibreglass roofing, while weighty electrical equipment was substituted with lighter counterparts wherever it was practical to do so.

== Design ==
The Class 82 is an AC electric locomotive intended for express services on the West Coast Main Line. Its design shared numerous aspects with, and had similarly performance attributes to, the preceding Class 81, such as its power rating of 3,300 hp, use of fully suspended traction motors and multi-anode mercury arc rectifiers.

Power was delivered to the locomotive via overhead catenary, energised at 25,000 V AC. However, the main transformer, which was normally operated with the four windings in series, could be operated at 6.25 kV AC with the transformer windings in parallel. This voltage was intended to be used where limited clearances gave concern over use of the higher voltage arcing onto lineside structures, especially those made of cast iron. Since the clearances were found to be adequate, the lower voltage-connections were locked out of use. The pantograph was raised using pressurised air, power for which was provided via the battery-powered auxiliary air compressor.

The locomotive body was largely composed of aluminium and resin-bonded fibreglass. The main transformer was housed within a centrally mounted power compartment, within which the rectifiers and their cooling apparatus set at one side and the transformers' oil-cooled radiator at the other. A narrow corridor ran alongside the power compartment, enabling train crews to move through to reach either cab of the locomotive. Various pieces of auxiliary equipment were installed along the walls of this corridor, including the battery charging frame and the l.t. equipment frame. Between the power compartment and the cabs at either end were insulated bulkheads, upon which equipment such as the four traction motor blowers and brake apparatus were fixed. Climate control within the power compartment was heavily regulated, with space heaters present to pre-heat the rectifiers to operating temperature, and numerous air-driven fans that maintained steady airflow towards vents set into the locomotive's roof.

The two cabs, one being set at either end of the locomotive, were largely identical in design and configuration. They were constructed by combining an aluminium outer shell and interior walls with a timber layer sandwiched between. Access to the power compartment was achieved via a centrally mounted door in the rear bulkhead behind the driver's position, which is outfitted with a pre-fabricated control unit that featured the majority of controls, gauges, indicators and instrumentation required. Excellent external visibility was provided via relatively wide forward and side cabin windows; both wipers and electrically powered demisting apparatus were also installed upon the forward windows. Various measures for operator comfort were also included, such as an upholstered adjustable seat for the drive, numerous heating units, and a compact cooker for train crews to prepare meals upon.

The underframe is the locomotive's major structural element, comprising a combination of rolled and welded steel plate, topped by an aluminium-steel deck. It bore standard screw couplings and oleo-pneumatic buffers. The underframe also functioned as a mounting point for several pieces of equipment, such as the battery, air reservoirs, and weak field resistances. The traction motors are also fully suspended on rubber brushed mountings; connected to one another in parallel, these motors are fed power via an iron-cored choke to smooth out the supply. If required, any single motor (or pair of motors) can be isolated from the other units. Power from these motors was directed to the bogie-mounted wheels via an Alsthom-supplied drive attached to a universal link assembly. Weight was transferred to the bogies via transverse spring planks mounted to the base of the body support struts. The bogies incorporated a Metrolink swing link suspension system that provided favourable ride characteristics even when travelling at high speeds.

== Operational history ==
Upon the type's introduction, all AL2 locomotives were allocated to Longsight depot in Manchester. During 1966, the final locomotive to be built, E3055, was destroyed by fire at Maw Green, near Crewe, leading to its withdrawal. The first locomotive built, E3046, was also destroyed by fire north of Bletchley on 7 January 1971 and was similarly withdrawn early.

=== Changes ===
E3049 was the first to be refurbished with a silicon rectifier, replacing the mercury-arc rectifier; its refurbishment was completed during 1972. The rest of the class followed suit over the following years.

Under the TOPS system, the type were reclassified as Class 82, while the individual locomotives were renumbered sequentially from 82001 to 82008.

=== Withdrawal ===
Following the introduction of newer electric locomotives, such as the Class 87, BR planners decided to withdraw the entire fleet, with most examples being placed into storage during 1982 and the majority of these locomotives were withdrawn in 1983. Two locomotives, 82005 and 82008, were subsequently reinstated for use on empty coaching stock workings between London Euston and Willesden, working until 1987, with 82008 receiving a repaint into InterCity Executive livery by 26 January 1986.

== Preservation ==
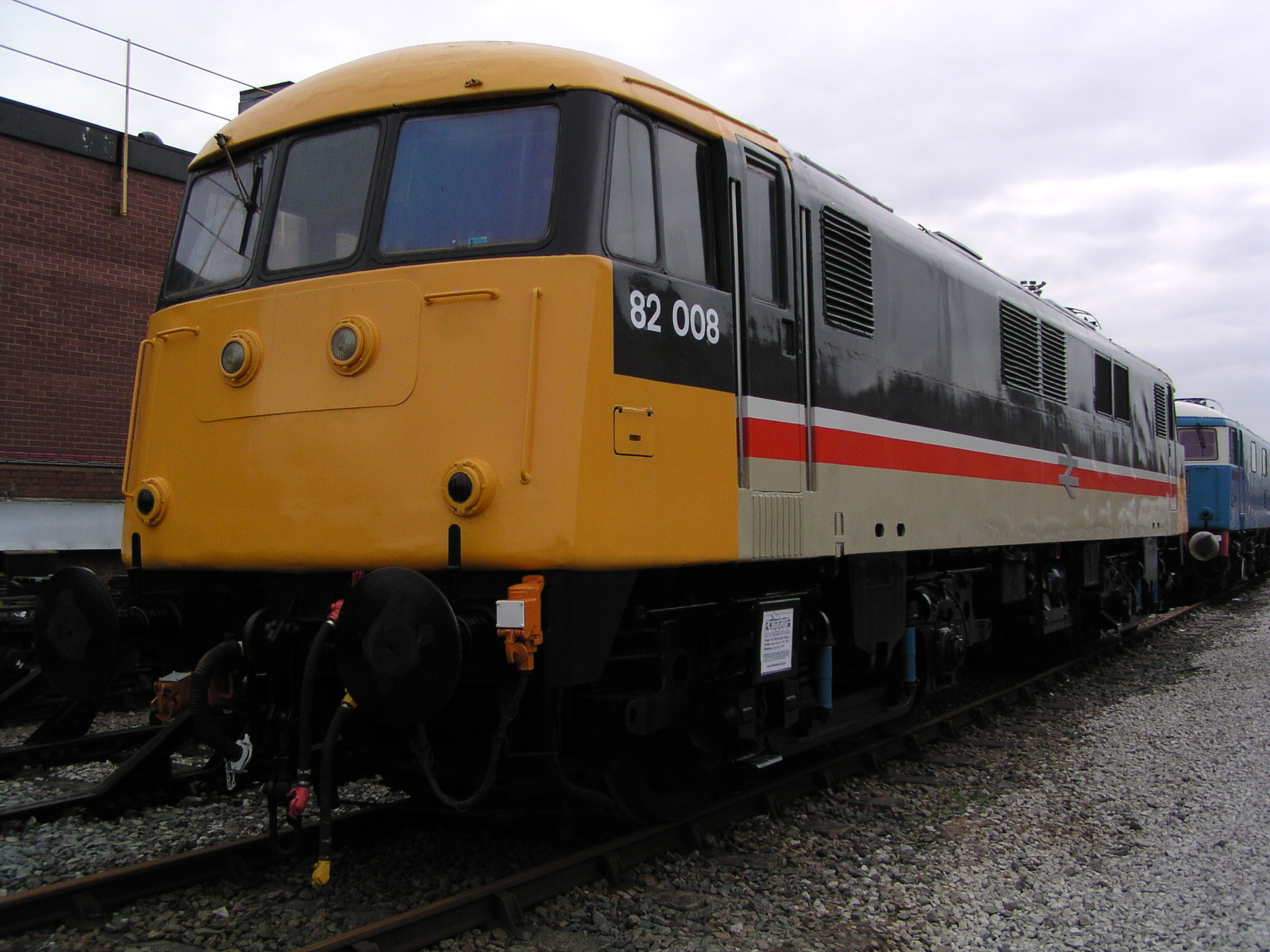
Preserved locomotive, no. 82008 on display at Crewe Works open day in 2005; it has been restored to InterCity Executive livery

82008 was preserved in the early 1990s, following a long period of storage, and was later purchased by the AC Locomotive Group. It is stored at Barrow Hill Roundhouse, near Chesterfield, Derbyshire.

== Fleet details ==
Key:	Preserved	Scrapped

Numbers		Works Number		Date Introduced	First Depot	Withdrawn	Final Depot	Disposal	
Pre-TOPS	TOPS	AEI	Beyer Peacock	Date Introduced	First Depot	Withdrawn	Final Depot	Location	Date
E3046	-	1021	7884	May 1960	9A	January 1971	CE	Scrapped at Crewe Works	June 1971
E3047	82001	1022	7885	July 1960	9A	July 1983	LG	Scrapped at Vic Berry, Leicester	March 1985
E3048	82002	1023	7886	August 1960	9A	July 1983	LG	Scrapped at Vic Berry, Leicester	October 1984
E3049	82003	1024	7887	September 1960	9A	July 1983	LG	Scrapped at CF Booth Ltd, Rotherham	June 1993
E3050	82004	1025	7888	October 1960	9A	October 1983	LG	Scrapped at Vic Berry, Leicester	November 1984
E3051	82005	1026	7889	November 1960	ACL (5H)	September 1987	WN	Scrapped at CF Booth Ltd, Rotherham	July 1993
E3052	82006	1027	7890	December 1960	ACL (5H)	July 1983	LG	Scrapped at Vic Berry, Leicester	November 1984
E3053	82007	1028	7891	January 1962	ACL (5H)	July 1983	LG	Scrapped at Vic Berry, Leicester	November 1984
E3054	82008	1029	7892	November 1961	ACL (5H)	December 1987	WN	Preserved at Barrow Hill Roundhouse	
E3055	-	1030	7893	April 1962	ACL (5H)	September 1969	CE	Scrapped at Crewe Works	August 1970
