= Barrow Hill Roundhouse =

Former Midland Railway roundhouse in Derbyshire, England

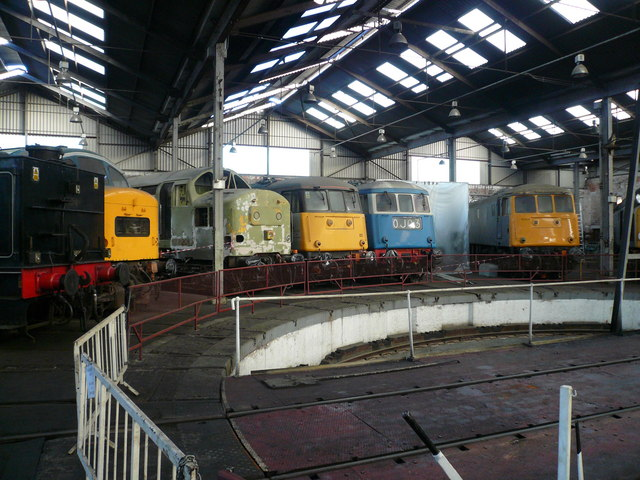
- A mix of steam, diesel and electric locomotives facing the roundhouse turntable

- Location within Derbyshire
- Alternative names: Staveley Roundhouse

General information
- Status: Listed building, Museum
- Type: Roundhouse
- Location: Barrow Hill, Derbyshire, England
- Coordinates: 53°16′28.00″N 1°22′54.50″W
- Current tenants: Barrow Hill Engine Shed Society
- Opened: 1870
- Renovated: 1998
- Cost: £16,445 4s 9d
- Client: Midland Railway
- Owner: Chesterfield Borough Council

Design and construction
- Main contractor: I.E. Hall

Listed Building – Grade II
- Official name: Engine shed 200 metres west of Campbell Drive (on unnamed road)
- Designated: 5 February 1991
- Reference no.: 1140134

Barrow Hill Roundhouse, known as Staveley Engine Shed until 1948, is a former Midland Railway roundhouse in Barrow Hill, near Staveley and Chesterfield, in Derbyshire, England. (Note: It is located at: grid reference SK413754) It now serves as a railway heritage centre.

== History ==
Staveley Roundhouse was built to a standard Midland Railway square shed design in 1870, with a central turntable under cover. After 1948, it became known as Barrow Hill so as not to confuse it with the ex-Great Central shed nearby. It was operational from 1870 until 9 February 1991.

=== Shed codes ===
- Midland Railway: M24
- London Midland & Scottish Railway: 18D
- Eastern Region of British Railways: 41E
- British Rail: BH (1973)

== Preservation ==
The building was heavily vandalised after its closure. Following lobbying of the local council, the building was Grade II listed by the Department of the Environment in February 1991. After negotiations with the British Railways Property Board, Chesterfield Borough Council became the new owner of the shed and nearby yard on 20 December 1996.

The council subsequently granted a recurring maintenance lease to the Barrow Hill Engine Shed Society, which secured and refurbished the site, including renewal of the original 1870 roundhouse glass roof, except for one section. Funding was provided by Derbyshire County Council, the Transport Trust, North Derbyshire Training and Enterprise Council, the European Regional Development Fund and the Government SRB fund. The site reopened to the public in July 1998.

Today, still retaining its connection to the UK National Rail network through Network Rail, it is home to many preserved British railway locomotives. The Harry Needle Railroad Company also stores and maintains a number of operational lease locomotives on site. As well as the main roundhouse building, Barrow Hill is also home to the former Pinxton signal box. Relocated after closure, it has since been refurbished and fitted out as per a typical day in its last year of use for Network Rail.

== Locomotives ==
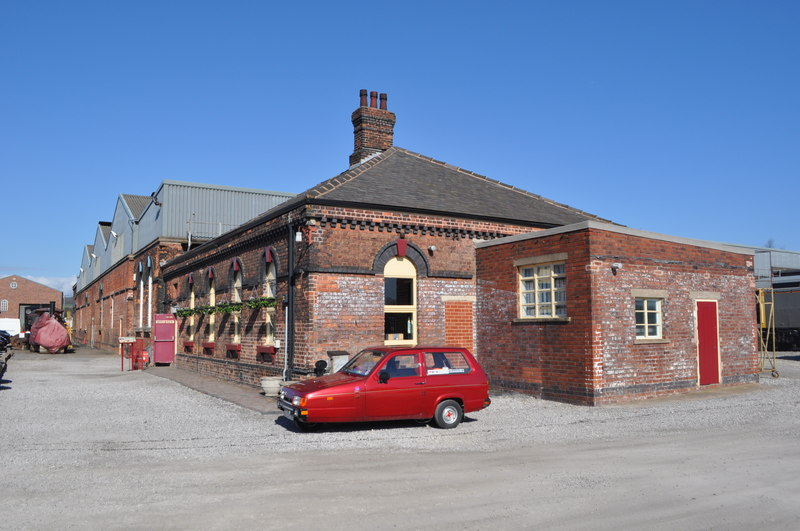
The Roundhouse in March 2011

Preserved locomotives at Barrow Hill are listed below: (Note: Note that there are also various locomotives either stored or under repair that are not listed here, which are owned by commercial entities on site.)

=== Steam ===
- GER Class G58 (LNER Class J17) 0-6-0 no. 8217. Built in 1905. On loan from the National Railway Museum. On static display.
- GCR Class 11F (LNER Class D11) 4-4-0 no. 506 Butler Henderson. Built in 1919. On loan from the National Railway Museum. On static display.
- MR 156 Class 2-4-0 no. 158A. Built in 1866. On loan from the National Railway Museum. On static display.
- MR 1000 Compound Class 4-4-0 no. 1000. Built in 1902. On loan from the National Railway Museum. On static display.
- MR 1F "Half-cab" 1377 Class 0-6-0T No 41708. Built in 1878. Undergoing overhaul.
- BR Standard Class 4 2-6-4T no. 80079. Built in 1954. On loan from the Severn Valley Railway. On static display.
- Hunslet Engine Company Austerity 0-6-0ST Works no. 3192, running no. 68006. Built in 1955. Undergoing overhaul.
- Hawthorn Leslie 0-4-0ST no. 2491 Henry. Built in 1901. On static display.
- Vulcan Foundry 0-4-0ST no. 3272 Vulcan. Built in 1918. Operational.

=== Diesel ===
- Drewry Car Co. 0-4-0 no. 2589 Harry. Built in 1956. Operational.
- BR 0-4-0DH Class 02 no. 02 003 (D2853) in BR Green. Built in 1960. Operational.
- BR 0-4-0DH Class 02 no. D2868 in BR Green. Built in 1960. Operational.
- BR 0-6-0DM Class 03 no. 03 066 (D2066) in BR Blue. Built in 1959. Operational.
- BR 0-6-0DE Class 07 no. 07 012 (D2996) in BR Blue. Built in 1962. On display.
- BR 0-6-0DE Class 10 no. D4092 in BR Green. Built in 1962. On display.
- BR Bo-Bo Class 23 "Baby Deltic" no. D5910. New-build, launched in September 2010, recreating an example of a long-lost class using body components from Class 37 no. 37 372.
- BR Bo-Bo Class 26 no. 26 007 (D5300) in Railfreight Red Stripe. Built in 1958. Operational.
- BR Bo-Bo Class 27 no. 27 066 (D5386/27 103) in BR Blue. Built in 1962. Stored.
- BR 1Co-Co1 Class 45 no. 45 060 (D100) Sherwood Forester in BR Blue. Built in 1961. Owned by Pioneer Diesel Locomotive Group. Operational.
- BR 1Co-Co1 Class 45 no. 45 105 (D86) in BR Blue. Built in 1961. Owned by Pioneer Diesel Locomotive Group. Undergoing restoration.
- BR Co-Co Class 55 no. D9009 (55 009) Alycidon in BR Blue. Built in 1961. Owned by Deltic Preservation Society. Operational.
- BR Co-Co Class 55 no. D9015 (55 015) Tulyar in BR Green. Built in 1961. Owned by Deltic Preservation Society. Undergoing overhaul.
- BR Co-Co Class 55 no. 55 019 (D9019) Royal Highland Fusilier in BR Blue. Built in 1961. Owned by Deltic Preservation Society. Operational.

=== Electric ===
- BR Bo-Bo Class 81 no. 81 002 in BR Blue. Built in 1960. Owned by the AC Locomotive Group.
- BR Bo-Bo Class 82 no. 82 008 in InterCity Executive. Built in 1961. Owned by the AC Locomotive Group.
- BR Bo-Bo Class 83 no. E3035 (83 012) in Electric Blue. Built in 1961. Owned by the AC Locomotive Group
- BR Bo-Bo Class 85 no. 85 006 in BR Blue. Built in 1961. Owned by the AC Locomotive Group.

== Rail-Ale Festival ==
There is a CAMRA beer festival at Barrow Hill Roundhouse in May each year, which attracts brewers and cider makers from around the country. A train operates to give rides to visitors.

== See also ==
- Listed buildings in Staveley, Derbyshire
