= British Rail Class 81 =

British class of electric locomotives

British Railways AL1, British Rail Class 81
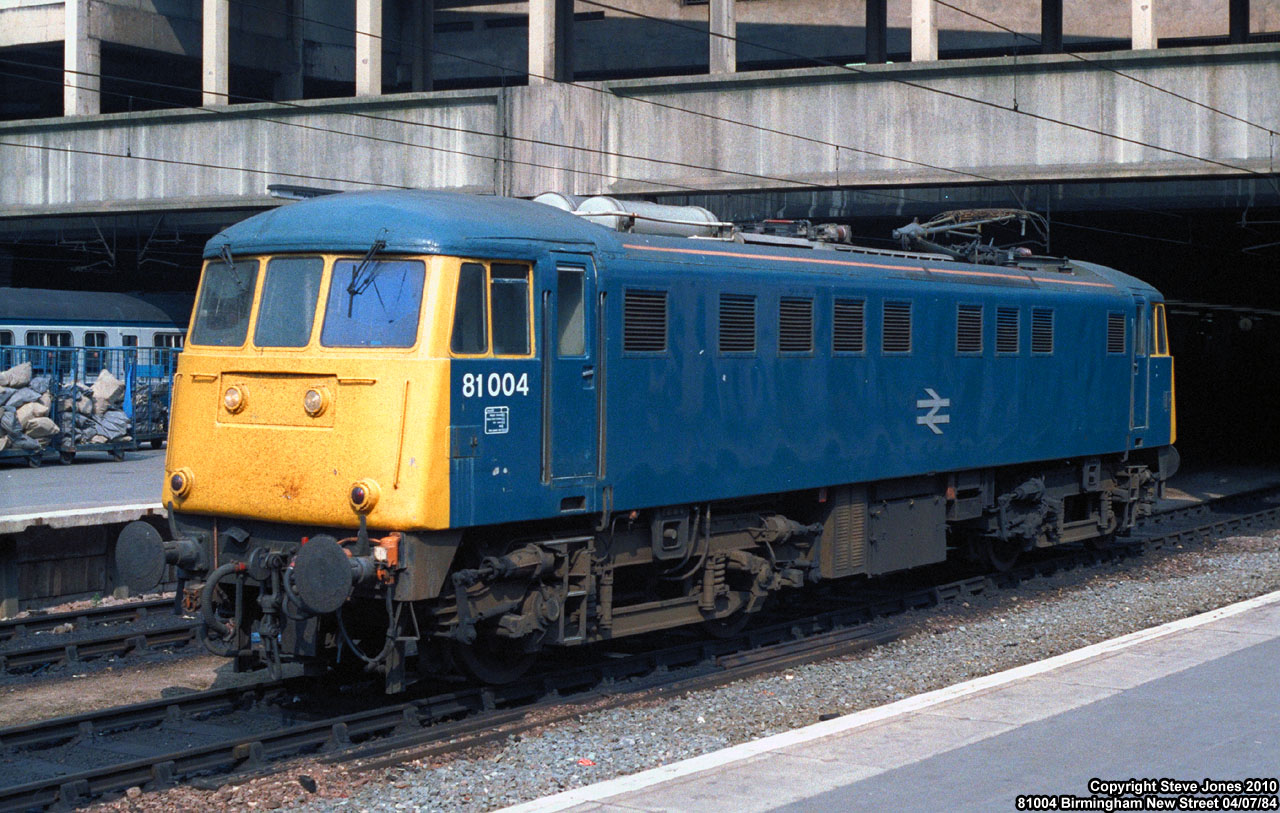
- 81004 at Birmingham New Street in 1984
Type and origin
- Power type: Electric
- Builder: Associated Electrical Industries at Birmingham Railway Carriage and Wagon Company
- Build date: 1959–1964
- Total produced: 25
Specifications
- Configuration
  - AAR: B-B
  - UIC: Bo′Bo′
  - Commonwealth: Bo-Bo
- Gauge: 4 ft 8 1/2 in (1,435 mm) standard gauge
- Bogies: Fabricated steel, Alsthom suspension
- Wheel diameter: 4 ft 0 in (1.219 m)
- Wheelbase: 42 ft 3 in (12.88 m)
  - Bogie: 10 ft 9 in (3.28 m)
- Pivot centres: 31 ft 6 in (9.60 m)
- Length
  - Over beams: 56 ft 6 in (17.22 m)
- Width: 8 ft 8 1/2 in (2.65 m)
- Height
  - Pantograph: 13 ft 0 9/16 in (3.977 m)
  - Body height: 12 ft 4 1/4 in (3.77 m)
- Axle load: 20 long tons 4 cwt (20.5 t)
- Loco weight: 79.60 long tons (80.9 t; 89.2 short tons)
- Electric system/s: 25 kV AC Catenary
- Current pickups: Stone Faiveley ‘V’-type pantograph, 2 off (later 1 off)
- Traction motors: 4 × AEI 189 6-pole Alsthom Quill drive 847 hp (632 kW)
  - Rating 1 hour: 760A
  - Continuous: 700A
- Gear ratio: 29:76 (Type A); 26:83 (Type B)
- Train heating: Electric Train Heating
- Loco brake: Westinghouse; Air, Rheostatic
- Train brakes: Vacuum; Dual from 1972–1973
Performance figures
- Maximum speed: 100 mph (161 km/h); Full field: 60 mph (97 km/h); Weak field: 71 mph (114 km/h)
- Power output
  - 1 hour: 4 × 920 hp (690 kW)
  - Continuous: 4 × 847 hp (632 kW)
- Tractive effort: 50,000 lbf (222 kN)
Career
- Operators: British Rail
- Numbers: E3001–E3023, E3096, E3097; later 81001–81022
- Axle load class: Route availability 6
- Retired: 1968 (2), 1971 (1), 1983–1991
- Preserved: 81002
- Disposition: 1 preserved, 24 scrapped

The British Rail Class 81 is a type of AC electric locomotives that formerly operated on the West Coast Main Line of British Rail's London Midland Region. Originally designated AL1, it was the first class of AC electric locomotive to be delivered to British Railways.

== History ==
As part of the modernisation of the West Coast Main Line, which included electrification, 100 locomotives of five types were acquired; each type from a different manufacturer.

The first locomotives to be delivered were type AL1, designed by British Thomson-Houston (BTH), an order being placed for 25 examples. Of these, 23 were for use on passenger trains with a top speed of 100 mph and were designated Type A. The other two locomotives were intended for freight train use and geared for a top speed of 80 mph; these were designated Type B.

Before the work was completed, BTH amalgamated with Metropolitan Vickers to form Associated Electrical Industries (AEI) traction division and it was under this name that the locomotives were built in 1959, under subcontract by Birmingham Railway Carriage & Wagon in Smethwick. The first locomotive, E3001, was handed over to British Railways on 27 November 1959. The type was initially used for crew training on the Styal Line between Manchester and Crewe.

The AL1 were numbered E3001-E3023 and E3096/97; the first twenty-three being Type A and the last two Type B (initially numbered E3301 and E3302). However, these last two were actually geared for passenger service, being delivered in February 1964.

== Power supply ==
The locomotives always worked on power provided by overhead catenary, energised at 25,000 V AC. However, the main transformer, normally operated with the four windings in series, could be operated at 6250 V AC with the transformer windings in parallel. This voltage was initially to be used where limited clearances gave concern over use of the higher voltage. However, this approach was never used on the West Coast Main Line, although it was employed elsewhere such as Glasgow Central in the initial Blue Train electrification there. By the time the WCML wiring was extended to Glasgow, it had been revised there to the mainstream 25 kV voltage.

The output of the transformer is converted to DC for the four six pole traction motors by three air-cooled six-anode pumpless steel tank mercury-arc rectifiers. The motors are also forced cooled. Voltage to the motors was governed by a 39 step tap changer on the low voltage side of the transformer.

== Operations ==
The class only operated on the West Coast Main Line, initially because they were restricted to lines electrified at 25 kV AC. Cities where these engines could be seen included London, Birmingham, Manchester, Liverpool and Glasgow. They operated passenger, freight and parcel trains.

== Renumbering ==
Under the TOPS system, twenty-two examples were reclassified as Class 81 from 1972 and were numbered 81001-81022.

== Withdrawals ==
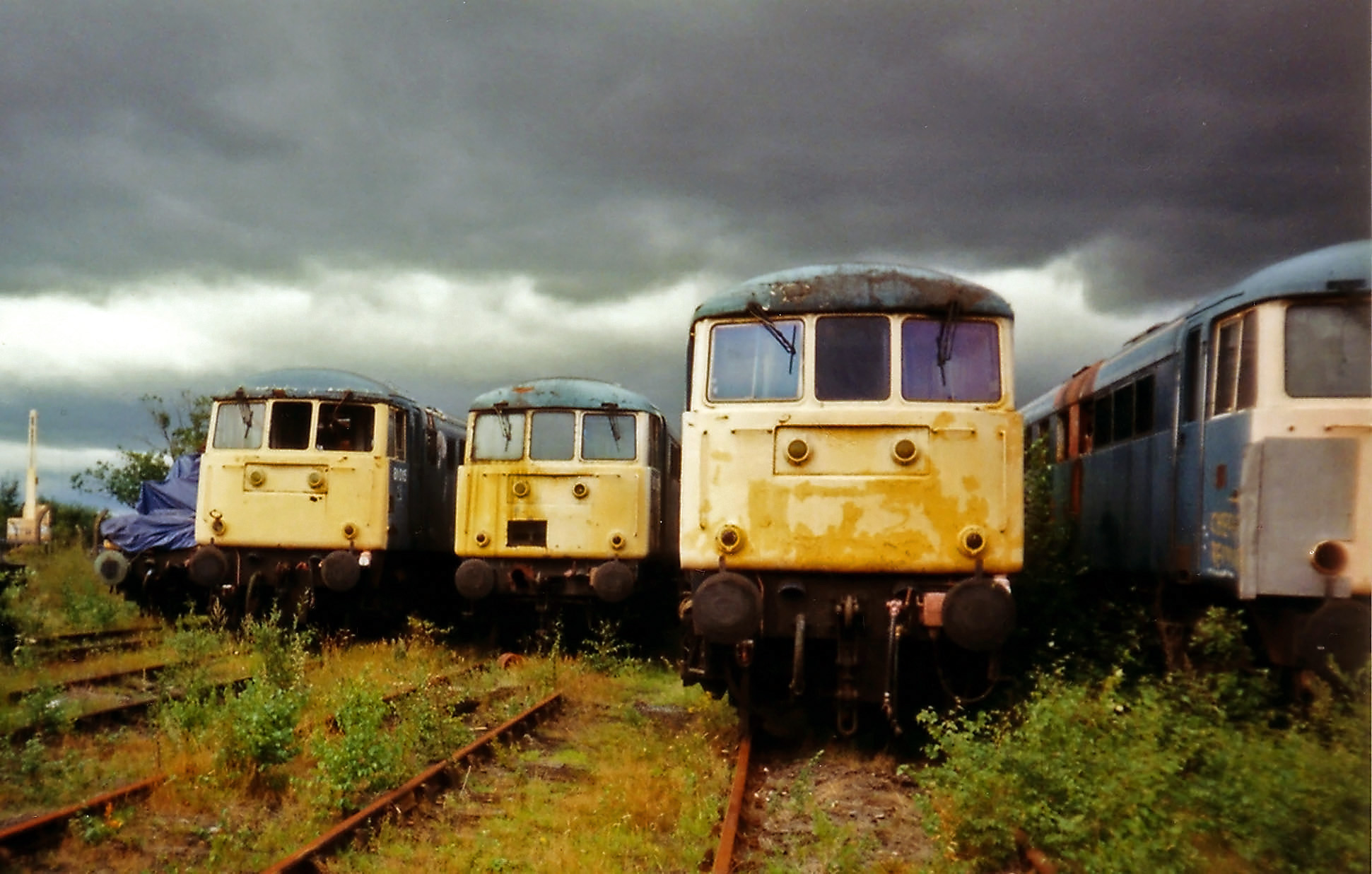
A row of Class 81 and 85 locomotives waiting to be scrapped. The first and third locomotives from the left are Class 81s

Three locomotives (E3002, E3009 and E3019) were withdrawn before they could be renumbered under the TOPS system, which was implemented in 1972. E3002 and E3019 were damaged by fire and both were scrapped at British Rail's Crewe Works. The remains of E3009 were also cut up at Crewe Works; the locomotive was wrecked in the Hixon rail crash of January 1968.

Two further members of the class saw relatively early withdrawal due to accident or fire damage:

- 9 December 1982: locomotive 81016 was derailed and severely damaged in an accident at Linslade Tunnel, in Bedfordshire, after striking an inadequately secured load that had fallen from a preceding train, killing the driver. It was officially withdrawn in 1983.
- 26 August 1983: locomotive 81001 was damaged by fire near Carstairs, in Lanarkshire, whilst working a Motorail train.

The remaining locomotives of the class had relatively successful service lives of 25 to 30 years; in their latter years, they became unreliable and displayed an increasing tendency to catch fire. However, a shortage of electric locomotives ruled out withdrawal of the fleet until the newer Class 90 locomotives came into service in the late-1980s. The remaining examples were withdrawn from service in the late-1980s and early-1990s. The final examples were used for the transfer of empty coaches between London Euston and Willesden sidings between 1989 and 1991 following the withdrawal of the final Class 83s in that role. The last two examples withdrawn from service were 81012 and 81017 in July 1991. The majority of the class were scrapped at Coopers Metals in Sheffield.

== Preservation ==
One example, 81002, has been preserved by the AC Locomotive Group; it is located at Barrow Hill Roundhouse, in Derbyshire.

== Fleet details ==
| Key: | Preserved | Scrapped |

| Numbers | | | AEI Works Number | Date Introduced | Withdrawn | Final Depot | Disposal | |
| Type B | Type A | TOPS | AEI Works Number | Date Introduced | Withdrawn | Final Depot | Location | Date |
|---|---|---|---|---|---|---|---|---|
| - | E3001 | 81001 | 1083 | December 1959 | July 1984 | GW | Fire damaged Scrapped at Crewe Works | September 1986 |
| - | E3002 | - | 1084 | January 1960 | November 1968 | ACL | Fire damaged Scrapped at Crewe Works | January 1969 |
| - | E3003 | 81002 | 1085 | February 1960 | October 1990 | WN | Preserved at Barrow Hill Roundhose | |
| - | E3004 | 81003 | 1086 | April 1960 | March 1988 | GW | Scrapped at Coopers Metals, Sheffield | November 1991 |
| - | E3005 | 81004 | 1087 | May 1960 | April 1990 | WN | Scrapped at MC Metals, Glasgow | May 1992 |
| - | E3006 | 81005 | 1088 | July 1960 | February 1989 | GW | Scrapped at Coppers Metals, Sheffield | November 1991 |
| - | E3007 | 81006 | 1089 | August 1960 | October 1988 | GW | Scrapped at Coopers Metals, Sheffield | November 1991 |
| - | E3008 | 81007 | 1090 | October 1960 | February 1990 | GW | Scrapped at Coopers Metals, Sheffield | November 1991 |
| - | E3009 | - | 1091 | October 1960 | August 1968 | ACL | Accident damaged Scrapped at Crewe Works | August 1968 |
| - | E3010 | 81008 | 1092 | November 1960 | March 1988 | GW | Scrapped at Coopers Metals, Sheffield | November 1991 |
| - | E3011 | 81009 | 1093 | December 1960 | February 1990 | WN | Scrapped at Coopers Metals, Sheffield | December 1991 |
| - | E3012 | 81010 | 1094 | December 1960 | May 1990 | WN | Scrapped at Coopers Metals, Sheffield | November 1991 |
| - | E3013 | 81011 | 1095 | December 1960 | April 1989 | GW | Scrapped at Coopers Metals, Sheffield | November 1991 |
| - | E3014 | 81012 | 1096 | December 1960 | July 1991 | WN | Scrapped at Coopers Metals, Sheffield | December 1991 |
| - | E3015 | 81013 | 1097 | December 1960 | October 1989 | GW | Scrapped at Coopers Metals, Sheffield | November 1991 |
| - | E3016 | 81014 | 1098 | March 1961 | March 1988 | GW | Scrapped at Coopers Metals, Sheffield | November 1991 |
| - | E3017 | 81015 | 1099 | May 1961 | December 1984 | GW | Scrapped at MC Metals, Glasgow | May 1992 |
| - | E3018 | 81016 | 1100 | March 1961 | July 1983 | GW | Accident damaged Scrapped at Crewe Works | January 1985 |
| - | E3019 | - | 1101 | April 1961 | July 1971 | ACL | Fire damaged Scrapped at Crewe Works | October 1971 |
| - | E3020 | 81017 | 1102 | May 1961 | July 1991 | WN | Scrapped at Coopers Metals, Sheffield | November 1991 |
| - | E3021 | 81018 | 1103 | June 1961 | January 1986 | GW | Scrapped at MC Metals, Glasgow | June 1992 |
| - | E3022 | 81019 | 1104 | October 1961 | January 1989 | GW | Scrapped at Coopers Metals, Sheffield | November 1991 |
| - | E3023 | 81020 | 1105 | February 1962 | July 1987 | GW | Scrapped at Coopers Metals, Sheffield | November 1991 |
| (E3301) | E3096 | 81021 | 1106 | June 1962 | April 1987 | GW | Scrapped at MC Metals, Glasgow | July 1992 |
| (E3302) | E3097 | 81022 | 1107 | February 1964 | July 1987 | GW | Scrapped at Crewe Works by A Hampton | November 1988 |

== Models ==
There have been no recent OO gauge models of the Class 81, although Hornby Dublo produced a model from 1964, prior to the purchase of Hornby by Lines Bros (owners of the Tri-ang Railways brand). This model was very crude, even by the standards of the day; it lacked cab interiors, had a poor pantograph and there was a lack of detail in the roof pan. It was issued under Tri-ang Hornby (predecessors to the current Hornby Railways brand) from 1966.

There has, however, been a static model in HO scale produced by Atlas Editions; some of these have been successfully motorised.
