= British Rail Class 83 =

British class of electric locomotives

British Railways AL3 British Rail Class 83
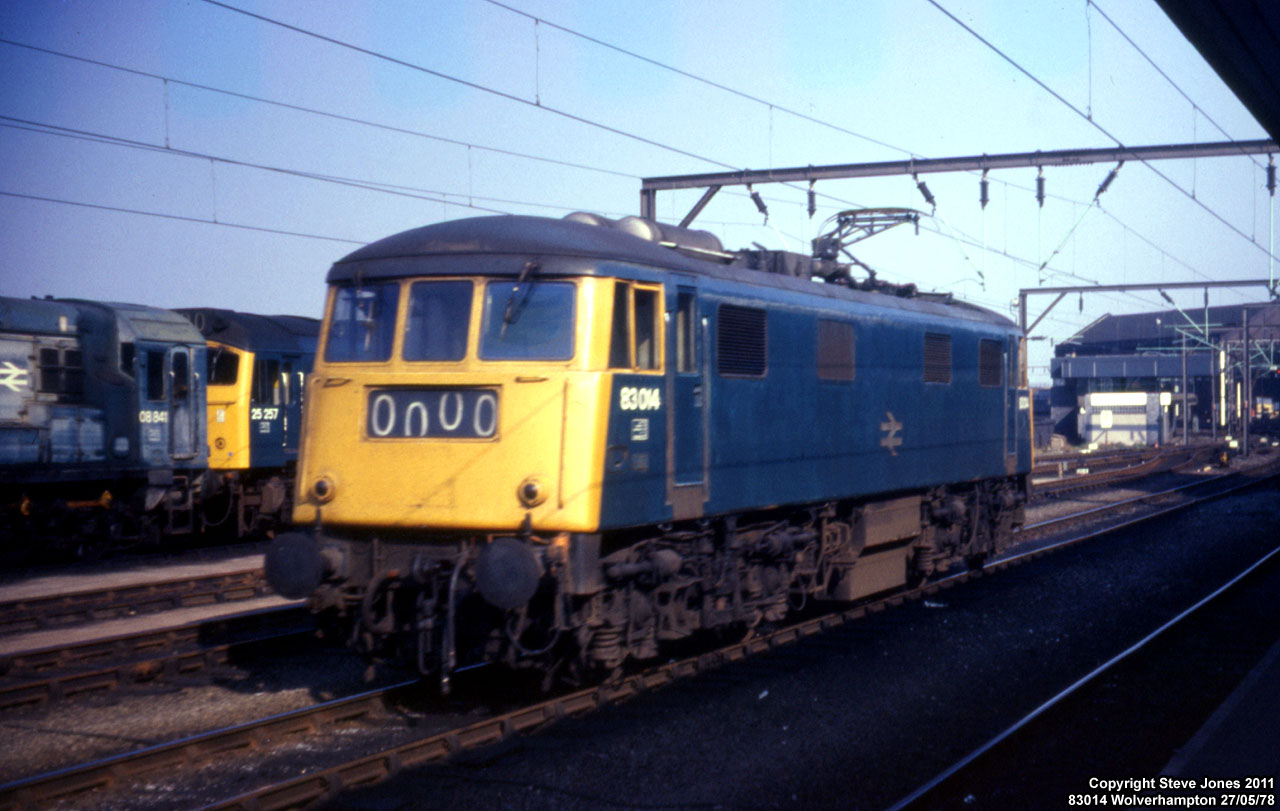
- 83014 at Wolverhampton in 1978
Type and origin
- Power type: Electric
- Builder: English Electric at Vulcan Foundry
- Order number: CCH 0916 (EE); 6794 (VF, E3024-8); 6795 (VF, E3029-33); 6796 (VF, E3034-5, E3303-4, E3100)
- Build date: 1960–1962
- Total produced: 15
Specifications
- Configuration
  - AAR: B-B
  - UIC: Bo′Bo′
  - Commonwealth: Bo-Bo
- Gauge: 4 ft 8 1/2 in (1,435 mm) standard gauge
- Wheel diameter: 4 ft 0 in (1.219 m)
- Minimum curve: 4 chains (80 m)
- Wheelbase: 40 ft 0 in (12.19 m)
- Length: 52 ft 6 in (16.00 m)
- Width: 8 ft 8 5/8 in (2.657 m)
- Height
  - Pantograph: 13 ft 0 5/8 in (3.978 m)
  - Body height: 12 ft 4 1/4 in (3.766 m)
- Adhesive weight: 19 long tons (19.3 t; 21.3 short tons)
- Loco weight: 76.40 long tons (77.6 t; 85.6 short tons)
- Electric system/s: 25 kV AC Catenary
- Current pickup: Pantograph
- Traction motors: 4 × English Electric 535A; 750 hp (560 kW)
- Train heating: Electric Train Heating index: 66
- Loco brake: Davies and Metcalfe (as built); Westinghouse (refurbishment)
- Train brakes: Vacuum, Dual from 1972–1973
Performance figures
- Maximum speed: 100 mph (160 km/h)
- Power output: 2,950 hp (2,200 kW) (continuous)
- Tractive effort: 38,000 lbf (169 kN) (max)
- Brakeforce: 38 tons
Career
- Operators: British Rail
- Class: AL3; later 83
- Number in class: 15
- Numbers: E3024–E3035, E3098-E3100; later 83001–83015
- Axle load class: Route availability 6
- Locale: West Coast Main Line
- Retired: 1975 (1), 1978 (1), 1983 (10), 1989 (3)
- Preserved: 1
- Scrapped: 1975, 1978, 1984 and 1993
- Disposition: One preserved, 14 scrapped

The British Rail Class 83 electric locomotives were built by English Electric at Vulcan Foundry, in Newton-le-Willows, Merseyside, England, to haul services on the West Coast Main Line following its electrification.

== History ==
=== Construction ===
Fifteen locomotives of Class 83 were built between 1960 and 1962 by English Electric at Vulcan Foundry, as part of British Rail's policy to develop a standard electric locomotive. Five prototype classes (81-85) were built and evaluated, which eventually led to the development of the Class 86 locomotive.

Three of these locomotives were to have been built as Type B, geared for freight trains; only two were so built, becoming E3303 and E3304. The third Type B, E3305, was never built as such; instead it was used as a test bed with silicon rectifiers and transductors, this being the first step towards thyristor control. It became a Type A, geared for passenger trains, and numbered E3100.

The other two Type B locomotives were eventually rebuilt as Type A, being renumbered E3098 (ex-E3303) and E3099 (ex-E3304). Power was provided by overhead catenary energised at 25,000 V AC.

Under the pre-TOPS British Rail classification, the first fourteen locomotives, E3024-E3035 and E3303, E3304 (later E3098 and E3099) were Class AL3 (meaning the third design of AC locomotive); the fifteenth engine, E3100, became Class AL3/1. All fifteen were included in the TOPS numbering system, being renumbered 83001-015.

The Polish EU06 class was produced by English Electric to a similar external design at the same time.

=== In service ===
The class was used to haul trains on the then newly-electrified West Coast Main Line, from Birmingham New Street to Crewe, Manchester Piccadilly, Liverpool Lime Street and later Preston. By 1965, electrification had spread south to London Euston.

=== Storage and refurbishment ===
As with the Class 84, the Class 83 suffered with problems with mercury-arc rectifiers. After spending several years in storage between 1967 and 1971, they were rebuilt with silicon rectifiers, as were already fitted to E3100, and dual braking between July 1970 and October 1973.

The decision to reinstate the fifteen engines of Class 83 was the result of the extension of the electrification from Weaver Junction to Glasgow Central, which required more electric locomotives. With both Class 83 and Class 84 being returned to traffic, only 36 Class 87s were required to be built.

=== Later use ===
Electrification finally reached Glasgow in the early 1970s, allowing this class to operate the full length of the West Coast Main Line.

The last three in service (83009, 83012 and 83015) were retained for use on empty coaching stock workings from London Euston to Willesden. 83009 had previously been used at Longsight Electric TMD in Manchester, to convert the 25 kV AC supply to 1500 V DC, to allow testing of the Class 506 units following the closure of Reddish Electric Depot.

=== Withdrawal ===
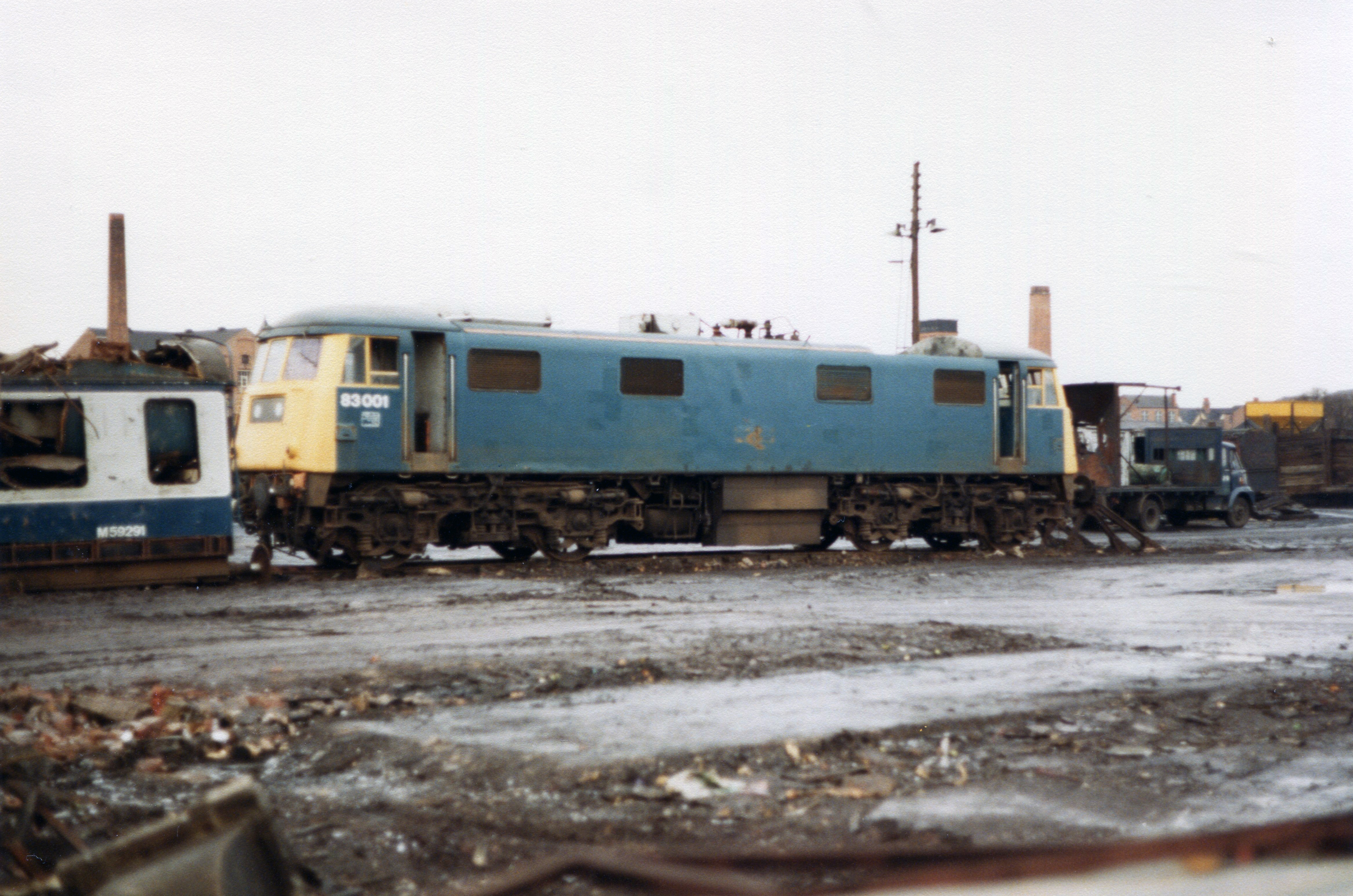
83001 at the Vic Berry Scrapyard

Two locomotives were withdrawn early as a result of accidents. The first was 83003, which was severely damaged in an accident on 23 January 1975 south of Watford Junction with a Class 86 (86209); it was withdrawn in May 1975.

The second engine was 83004, which was severely damaged in a collision with a Class 47 near to Willesden TMD on 24 December 1977. In 1983, ten of the remaining thirteen engines were withdrawn, all being sent to the Vic Berry scrapyard in Leicester. The final three were withdrawn in 1989, with two of the three being scrapped at MC Metals of Glasgow in 1993.

== Power supply ==
The locomotives operated on power provided by overhead catenary energised at 25,000 V AC. However, the main transformer, normally operated with the four windings in series, could be operated at 6250 V AC with the transformer windings in parallel. This voltage was initially to be used where limited clearances gave concern over use of the higher voltage. Since the clearances were found to be adequate, the lower voltage connections were locked out of use.

== Preservation ==
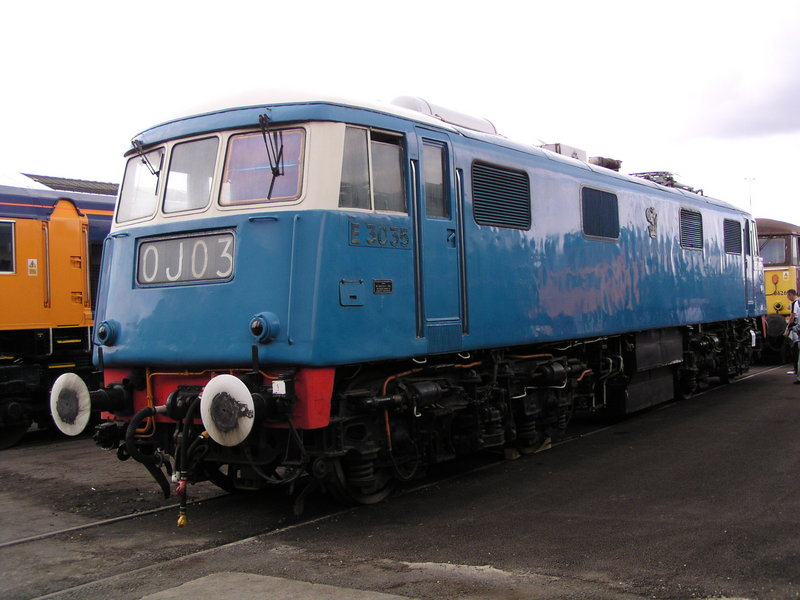
E3035, on display at Doncaster Works open day in 2003

One locomotive has been preserved by the AC Locomotive Group:

- 83012 / E3035 at Barrow Hill Roundhouse, in Derbyshire.

The locomotive was originally preserved by Pete Waterman in 1992 and then purchased by its current owners in 1997.

== Fleet details ==
Key:	Preserved	Scrapped

Numbers			Works Number		Date Introduced	Withdrawn	Disposal	
Type B	Type A	TOPS	English Electric	Vulcan Foundry	Date Introduced	Withdrawn	Location	Date
-	E3024	83001	2928	E264	July 1960	December 1984	Scrapped at Vic Berry, Leicester	December 1984
-	E3025	83002	2929	E265	July 1960	July 1983	Scrapped at Vic Berry, Leicester	November 1984
-	E3026	83003	2930	E266	August 1960	May 1975	Scrapped at Crewe Works	July 1975
-	E3027	83004	2931	E267	September 1960	January 1978	Scrapped at Coopers Metals, Sheffield	February 1978
-	E3028	83005	2932	E268	October 1960	July 1983	Scrapped at Vic Berry, Leicester	November 1984
-	E3029	83006	2933	E269	October 1960	July 1983	Scrapped at Vic Berry, Leicester	October 1984
-	E3030	83007	2934	E270	November 1960	July 1983	Scrapped at Vic Berry, Leicester	December 1984
-	E3031	83008	2935	E271	December 1960	July 1983	Scrapped at Vic Berry, Leicester	November 1984
-	E3032	83009	2936	E272	December 1960	March 1989	Scrapped at MC Metals, Glasgow	August 1993
-	E3033	83010	2937	E273	16 December 1960	July 1983	Scrapped at Vic Berry, Leicester	December 1984
-	E3034	83011	2938	E274	February 1961	July 1983	Scrapped at Vic Berry, Leicester	November 1984
-	E3035	83012	2941	E277	July 1961	March 1989	Preserved at Barrow Hill Roundhouse	
E3303	E3098	83013	2939	E275	March 1961	July 1983	Scrapped at Vic Berry, Leicester	October 1984
E3304	E3099	83014	2940	E276	May 1961	July 1983	Scrapped at Vic Berry, Leicester	October 1984
(E3305)	E3100	83015	2942	E278	July 1962	February 1989	Scrapped at MC Metals, Glasgow	April 1993
