= British Rail Mark 5 (disambiguation) =

British Rail Mark 5 is a type of passenger coach built for Caledonian Sleeper.

British Rail Mark 5 may refer to:

- British Rail Mark 5A, a type of passenger coach built for TransPennine Express and currently in use with Chiltern Railways on the Chiltern Main Line
- British Rail Mark 5 (InterCity 250), an unbuilt type of coach intended as part of the planned InterCity 250 project for the West Coast Main Line
