= British Rail Mark 5 (InterCity 250) =

Planned passenger rolling stock

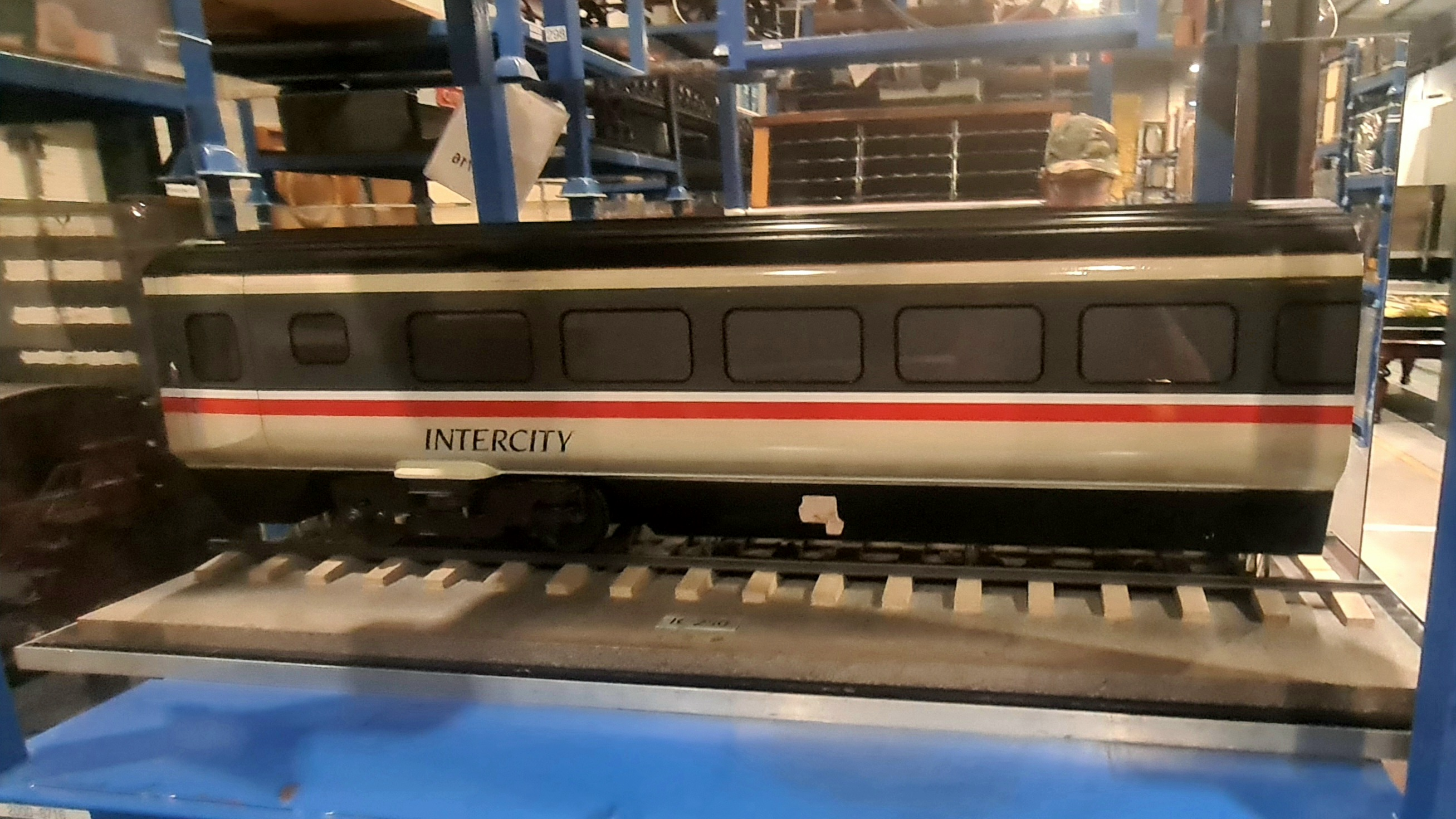
- In service: Proposed 1994/1995
- Number built: None
- Formation: 9 carriage sets
- Capacity: 52 / 88 seats – first / standard class per carriage
- Operators: InterCity West Coast (Proposed)
- Lines served: West Coast Main Line (see Project Description)

Specifications
- Car body construction: Integral Steel or Aluminium monocoque
- Car length: 26 m (85 ft 4 in) over buffers
- Width: 2.7 m (8 ft 10 in)
- Height: Unknown
- Doors: Hinged Plug, pneumatically operated
- Maximum speed: 155 mph (250 km/h)
- Weight: c. 35 – 42 tonnes
- HVAC: Air-Conditioned, Pressure Sealed.
- Bogies: Unknown
- Braking system(s): Disc, pneumatically operated
- Track gauge: 1,435 mm (4 ft 8 1/2 in) standard gauge

The British Rail Mark 5 was the designation given to the planned passenger rolling stock for the InterCity 250 project, a plan to improve speeds on the West Coast Main Line that was ultimately cancelled.

== InterCity 250 ==
=== Background ===
The Mark 5 project was intended to produce a new generation of InterCity passenger rolling stock, anticipated for initial use on the West Coast Main Line (WCML), these would have been developed from the Mark 4 stock in service on the East Coast Main Line (ECML). The profile of the InterCity 250 Mark 5 coaches was designed for non-tilting operation unlike the briefly contemplated use of tilting "Mark 4 T" stock on the WCML which is evident in the sloping sides of the Mark 4 coaches.

Following introduction on the WCML, it was suggested that the coaches could have been used as part of later IC250 builds for the East Coast and Great Western Main Lines, replacing the Mark 3 and Mark 4 coaches used in the InterCity 125 and 225s.

Earlier internal studies by British Rail Research in the early 1980s had focussed on the feasibility of developing a 25.5 m long InterCity coach to succeed the Mark 3 and evaluated the technologies needed to reduce the capital and operating costs by 30%. This was referred to as a Mark 4 coach and targeted a 125 mph (201 km/h) operating speed, however the fitting of a Hydrokinetic Brake would provide 155 mph (249 km/h) capability.

=== Project description ===
The intention of InterCity 250 was to build 30 full trains, each consisting of a Class 93 locomotive, nine 26 m (85 ft) long Mark 5 passenger coaches and a Mark 5 Driving Van Trailer. The coaches would be capable of 155 mph (249 km/h) and were specified to be equivalent in weight to the shorter Mark 4 coaches, which were felt to be overweight. The decision to increase the length of the coaches to 26 m (85 ft) from the 23 m (75 ft) of the Mark 4 was dictated by reduced maintenance costs following British Rail studies which indicated that such a length was feasible within the UK loading gauge. Indeed, during 1987 British Rail had considered increasing the length of the Mark 4 to 25.5 m (with 18.13 m (59.5 ft) bogie centres) but the in-service date of 1989 and complexity of changing the design to suit caused the variation order to be shelved.

The Mark 5 coaches would have been streamlined with powered plug fit doors and potentially fitted with an active suspension system which would help to contribute towards a desired 30% improvement in ride quality compared to the Mark 3 coach – then the benchmark used by InterCity. Development of the Mark 5 rolling stock was accompanied by research into improvements in track quality needed to achieve the desired ride quality at 155 mph (249 km/h). The compliance with the low frequency dynamic and static "P2" track force of 322 N was proposed to be addressed by using normal ride quality standards up to 125 mph (201 km/h), followed by a higher track quality over 125 mph. Some of this research by BR was undertaken via computer simulations using the vehicle dynamics software "VAMPIRE" for operation on both the WCML and ECML; this utilised track geometry and ride quality data gathered from Mark 4 rolling stock test runs on the ECML.

The interior of mockups (designed by FM Design, and constructed within marine plywood enclosures at British Rail's Engineering Development Unit, at the Railway Technical Centre, Derby during 1991) indicated a 2+2 seating arrangement in standard class (88 seats per coach) with 2+1 in first class (52 seats per coach). The Driving Van Trailer would also have come under the Mark 5 project remit. These would have resembled the Class 93 locomotives, with luggage space, a kitchen and a driving cab, similar to those commissioned for the InterCity 225 project.

In early 1991, tenders were called for up to 45 ten carriage sets with GEC Alsthom, Bombardier/Prorail, and British Rail Engineering Limited/ABB invited to bid.

Creating the Class 93s alone would have cost £380 million. With limited funding after the ECML electrification project was completed, the costs were deemed too high, and the project was terminated.

=== Legacy ===
After the InterCity 250 project was scrapped, Virgin Trains, who operated the InterCity West Coast franchise from the privatisation of British Rail until 2019, commissioned new rolling stock in the form of Class 390 electric multiple units, rather than the Class 93 locomotive and separate Mark 5 carriages proposed by British Rail. Network Rail track design standards previously used the Mark 5 coach to represent coaching stock with 19 m (62 ft) bogie centres, however from June 2016 references to this requirement were removed. Passenger Gauge 3 (PG3) with 17 m (56 ft) bogie centres and 2.6m wheelbases is under development to replace this for future vehicles.

== See also ==
- British Rail Mark 5 - a family of coaches using the same designator, built for Caledonian Sleeper.
- British Rail Mark 5A - a family of push-pull coaches using a similar designator, originally built for TransPennine Express.
