= British Rail Class 93 (InterCity 250) =

Planned electric locomotive, never built

- Artist’s impression of a Class 93 locomotive
Type and origin
- Power type: Electric
- Builder: Siemens, GEC-Alsthom or ABB Traction
- Build date: Never Built
Specifications
- Configuration
  - AAR: B-B
  - UIC: Bo′Bo′
  - Commonwealth: Bo-Bo
- Gauge: 1,435 mm (4 ft 8 1/2 in) standard gauge
- Electric system/s: 25 kV AC Catenary
- Current pickup: Pantograph (2 per power car)
- Traction motors: Asynchronous 3-Phase AC
- MU working: Within class
- Loco brake: Disc, Tread & Rheostatic
- Train brakes: Disc
Performance figures
- Maximum speed: 155 mph (250 km/h)
- Power output: 5.5 MW (7,400 hp)
Career
- Operators: Intended for British Rail; InterCity West Coast
- Numbers: 93001–93040?

British Rail Class 93 is the traction classification assigned to the electric locomotives that were to enter service as part of British Rail (BR)'s InterCity 250 project on the West Coast Main Line (WCML). They would have been capable of travelling at up to 155 mph (250 km/h), and powering a push-pull train of up to nine Mark 5 coaches and a driving van trailer (DVT), similar to the InterCity 225 sets.

The locomotives would have been derived from the Class 91 locomotives that entered service on the East Coast Main Line in 1989, and would thus have traced a lineage back to the Advanced Passenger Train (APT) that was planned to run on the WCML more than a decade earlier.

Tenders to construct the locomotives and rolling stock were issued in March 1991, with an expected service date of 1995; it was anticipated that up to 30 complete trains would be initially required, at a total estimated cost of £380 million. However, the cancellation of the InterCity 250 project in July 1992 meant that the rolling stock orders were never placed.

== Speed and aerodynamic properties ==
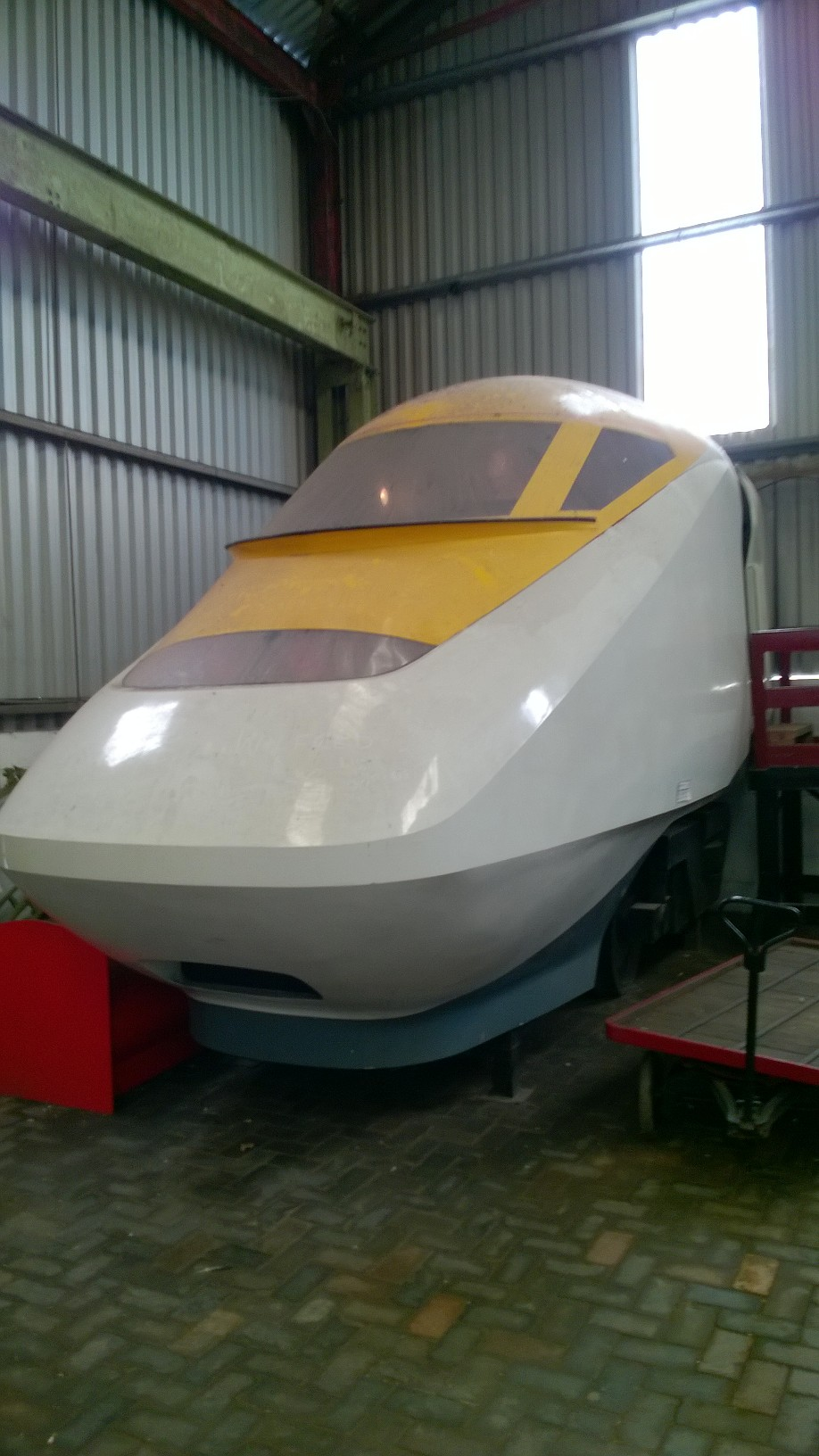
Mock-up of the Class 93 cab

The sleek, aerodynamic design of the Class 93 would have allowed maximum speeds of up to 155 mph (250 km/h). However, the initial maximum speed would have been limited to 125 mph (201 km/h) due to signalling and track alignment constraints.

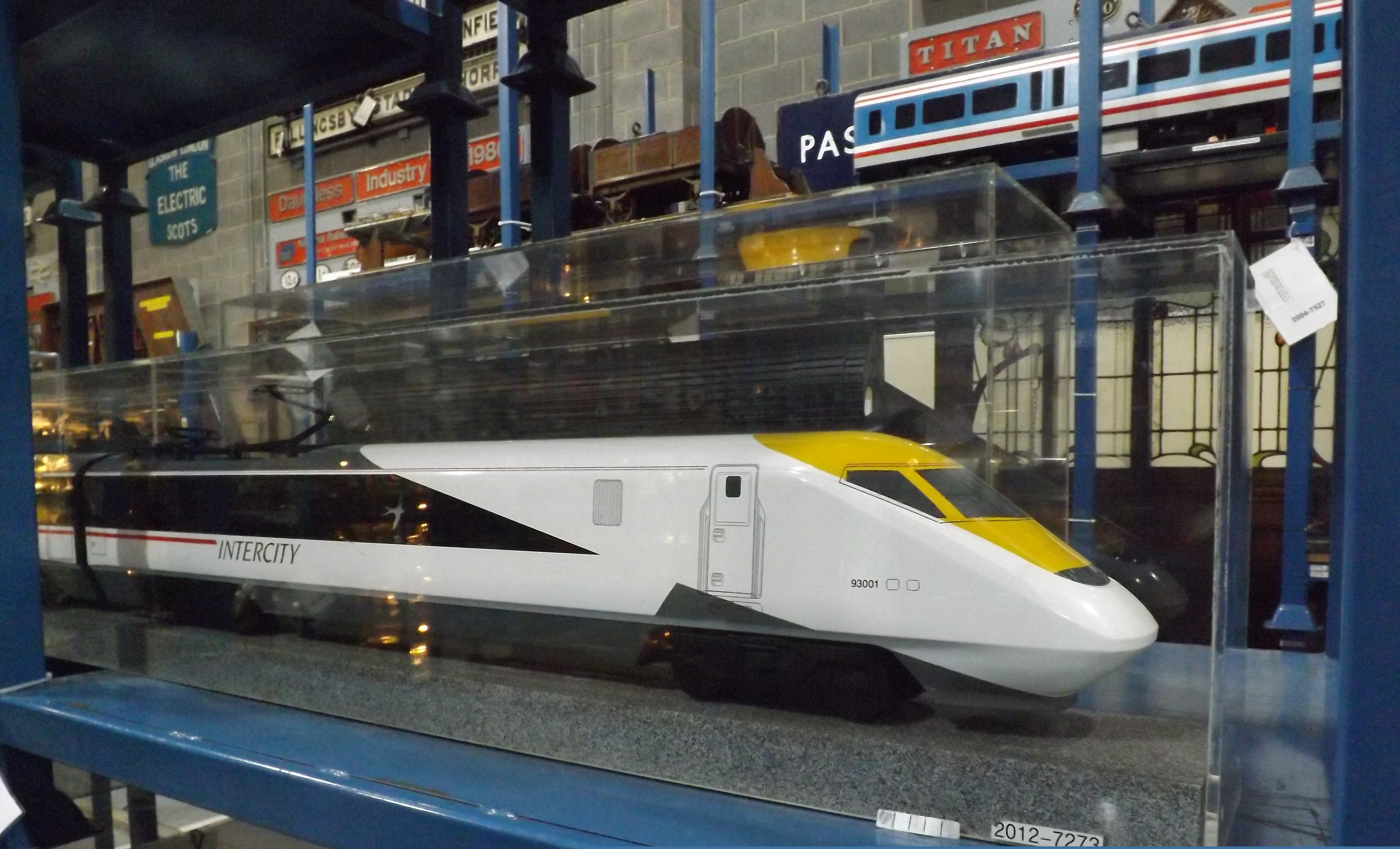
A model (scale 1:20) of the Class 93 at the National Railway Museum in York.

== Limited funding ==
The InterCity 250 project was to be the next major infrastructure project following the East Coast Main Line electrification and delivery of the InterCity 225s. However, BR was also beginning a major upgrade of its suburban and commuter Electric Multiple Unit (EMU) rolling stock on Network SouthEast, with the introduction of the Networker series as well as the construction of the Channel Tunnel lines. As a consequence, funding was limited. This meant that the £380 million for the locomotives added to the required cost of upgrades to the WCML infrastructure was not available. Due to this the project was stopped.

== Legacy ==
A life-size mock-up of the Class 93 is on display at the Midland Railway – Butterley in Swanwick and a 1:20 scale model is displayed in the Warehouse in the National Railway Museum, York. Prior to the announcement of Agility Trains as the preferred bidder for the Intercity Express Programme a number of commentators called for the InterCity 250 / Class 93 idea to be revived as the basis for replacement rolling stock on the East Coast Main Line. Even though the Class 93s were never built, the traction characteristics of the locomotives were used in Railtrack WCML feasibility studies to determine the electrification requirements for an upgraded line. Virgin Trains (the operators of the InterCity West Coast franchise after privatisation) consequently ordered new rolling stock for the route, albeit EMUs rather than loco-hauled stock.

== See also ==
- British Rail Class 93 (Stadler)
