= British Rail Class 19 =

Experimental railway locomotive

Type and origin
- Power type: Diesel-hydrostatic
- Designer: BREL
- Builder: BREL; Artemis Intelligent Power (conversion)
- Build date: 1988; 2017-18 (conversion)
- Total produced: 1
Specifications
- Gauge: 1,435 mm (4 ft 8 1/2 in) standard gauge
- Length: 18.83 m (61 ft 9 3/8 in)
- Width: 2.71 m (8 ft 10 3/4 in)
- Height: 3.88 m (12 ft 8 3/4 in)
- Prime mover: JCB diesel engine
- Transmission: Hydrostatic
- Loco brake: Air
Career
- Operators: Artemis Intelligent Power
- Numbers: 19001

Class 19 is the name given to an experimental railway locomotive that was constructed using a Mark 3 DVT. The locomotive is part of a project funded by the Rail Safety and Standards Board (RSSB) to test the viability of combining hydrostatic transmission with a form of regenerative braking that can reduce engine emissions.

Hydrostatic transmissions have been used previously for rail vehicles, but only for slow-speed track maintenance vehicles and similar, not for mainline locomotives. Diesel-hydraulic locomotives instead use a hydrodynamic, i.e. torque converter, transmission.

== History ==
In 2017, the RSSB announced that it planned to fund the development of an experimental rail vehicle in conjunction with Artemis Intelligent Power, a developmental company specialising in hydraulic machines. The intention of the project was to develop a rail vehicle that could store braking energy, which could then be released during acceleration. It would be powered by diesel engines as the prime mover, driving hydraulic pumps and then hydraulic motors mounted on the axles. These motors could also act as pumps, storing braking energy in hydraulic accumulators. This type of system is being offered as a potential solution for use in areas that are not economical to electrify.

The RSSB and Artemis entered into a collaboration with Chiltern Railways to obtain a suitable vehicle, with one of Chiltern's DVTs chosen as the donor vehicle. The vehicle, 82113, was moved for conversion to the Bo'ness and Kinneil Railway in July 2017, where work began. This involved the installation of the JCB diesel engines, the Artemis E-dyn 96 Digital Displacement Hydraulic Pump and the axle mounted motors. The vehicle was also fitted with a second cab by the removal of the guard's compartment, allowing it to be driven from either end. The vehicle was started for the first time on 20 July 2018. Commissioning trials began on 1 August 2018 jointly between Artemis and the SRPS Diesel Group.
