= Metal Management =

Metal Management was a metal recycling company, founded in 1983 and re-incorporated in Delaware, USA, in June 1986. Originally known as General Parametrics, Metal Management entered the scrap metal recycling industry on April 11, 1996, through its merger with EMCO Recycling Corp.

== Overview ==
Headquartered in Chicago, Illinois, Metal Management was involved in dismantling, purifying, processing and recycling ferrous and non-ferrous metals. The company owned or operated recycling facilities in sixteen U.S. states. It resold the scrap metal it processed to both domestic and foreign customers.

From 1996 to 1998, the company underwent a significant expansion, employing the strategy of acquiring and integrating regional metal recyclers throughout the United States. Metal Management emerged as the most diverse, well-run business of its kind in North America.

In 2007, Metal Management announced that it would have been acquired by the Australia-based Sims Group for US$1.8 billion.

== See also ==
- Wrecking yard
- Scrap
- Scrap metal
