= Driving Van Trailer =

British control car

British Rail DVT
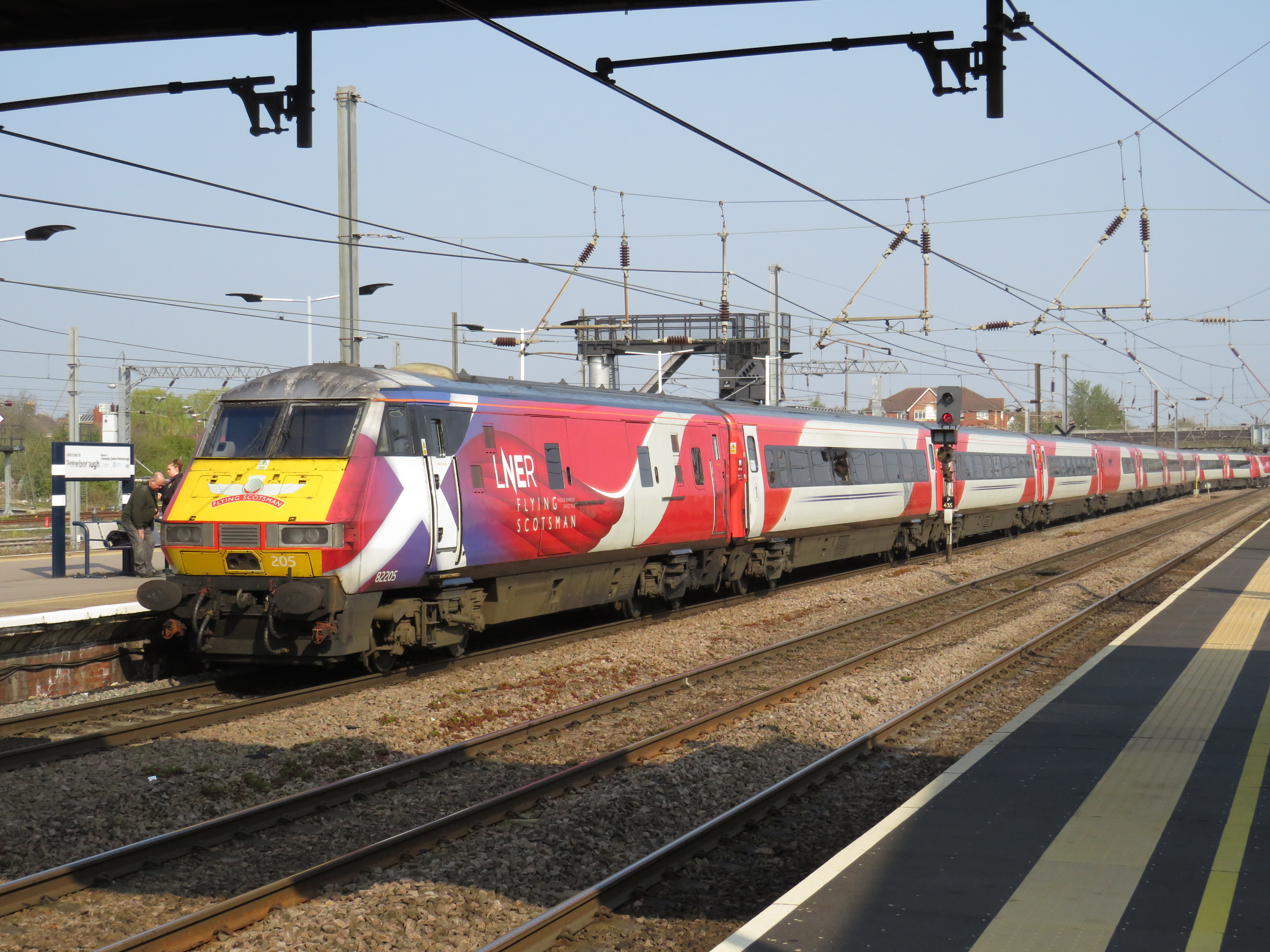
- London North Eastern Railway Mk4 DVT at Peterborough
- In service: 1989 – present
- Manufacturers: Mark 3: British Rail Engineering Limited; Mark 4: Metro-Cammell
- Family name: Mark 3 (82101–82152); Mark 4 (82200–82231)
- Constructed: 1988 - 1990
- Number built: Mark 3: 52; Mark 4: 32
- Number in service: Mark 3: 8; Mark 4: 23
- Number preserved: Mark 3: 7; Mark 4: 0
- Number scrapped: Mark 3: 20; Mark 4: 7
- Fleet numbers: 82101–82152; 82200–82231
- Operators: Chiltern Railways; DB Cargo UK; London North Eastern Railway; Network Rail; Transport for Wales

Specifications
- Car length: 18.83 m (61 ft 9 in)
- Width: 2.71 m (8 ft 11 in)
- Height: 3.88 m (12 ft 9 in)
- Maximum speed: 125 mph (201 km/h) (Mark 3); 140 mph (225 km/h) (Mark 4)
- Weight: 43.7 t (43.0 long tons; 48.2 short tons)
- Braking system: Air
- Track gauge: 1,435 mm (4 ft 8 1/2 in) standard gauge

A Driving Van Trailer (DVT) is a British purpose-built control car railway vehicle that allows the driver to operate with a locomotive in push-pull formation from the opposite end of a train. A key benefit of operating trains with DVTs is the requirement for fewer locomotives; for example, a second locomotive would otherwise have to join at the other end of the train after arrival at terminal stations to lead the train's onward journey.

The Mark 3 DVT was originally designed and produced by British Rail Engineering Limited (BREL) during the late 1980s and early 1990s. Unlike many other control cars, such as the Mark 2 DBSO, the DVT visually resembles a locomotive, specifically Class 90 for the 82/1 Mark 3 series and Class 91 for the 82/2 Mark 4 series; thus when the train is operating in push mode, it does not appear to be travelling backwards. The vehicles do not have any passenger accommodation due to health and safety rules in place at the time of construction that prohibited passengers in the leading carriages of trains that run faster than 100 miles per hour (160 km/h).

The later-built Mark 4 DVT was specifically developed to work with the new Mark 4 carriages of the InterCity 225 on the East Coast Mainline while the Mark 3 DVT was built to work with the Mark 2 and Mark 3 carriages which then comprised the InterCity rolling stock on the West Coast Main Line. A planned Mark 5 DVT was never produced. Following the Privatisation of British Rail, various private sector train operators have opted to use DVTs in their services. In some cases, such as Wrexham & Shropshire's services between London Marylebone and Wrexham General using Mark 3s and Class 67 diesel locomotives, the DVTs required modification to work with new types of locomotives. Other operators have opted to have their DVTs outfitted with diesel generators or even traction apparatus, the latter case resulting in the experimental Class 19 locomotive.

== Development ==
The DVT concept is similar to the Mark 2 DBSO but, unlike its predecessor which was rebuilt from existing stock, it was a new build vehicle manufactured specifically for this purpose. The first design of DVT was designed to match Mark 2 and Mark 3 coaches. The second design has a narrower profile, similar to Mark 4 coaches, which would enable it to be converted to tilting operation if required in the future. The nose of the vehicle was styled to closely resemble the Class 90 and 91 locomotives that they were paired with.

The original Mark 3 DVTs, which operated on the West Coast Main Line, used the RCH jumpers to carry the signals, therefore allowing the same cables to be used for lighting and the public address system, as well as driver-guard signalling. The Class 86 and Class 87 locomotives had to be retrofitted with RCH cables, replacing the older multiple working jumpers that some of them had been fitted with.

The InterCity 225 sets operate on the East Coast Main Line; the Mark 4 DVTs and locomotives operate in push-pull formation utilising a time-division multiplexer to send control signals along specially screened cables which run the length of the train. The locomotives usually face north, away from London, only being changed occasionally in rare circumstances; this is because the Class 91 depots (formerly Bounds Green and now Neville Hill) are situated at the north end of King's Cross and Leeds stations respectively, allowing easy changeover.

When a train is operated by a DVT, the control signals are encoded and multiplexed onto the cables by the TDM equipment in the DVT. At the locomotive, these signals are demultiplexed by the TDM equipment and the signals are used to control the locomotive. The air braking system is operated directly from whichever cab the driver is driving from. If the TDM fails and cannot be reconfigured, the train may still operate; however, if the DVT is leading, it will be necessary to uncouple the locomotive and attach it to the front of the train.

In addition to the driver's cab, some DVTs have luggage and cycle storage space and a guard's office. One DVT was fitted with a traction gel applicator. A number of Mark 3 DVTs have been fitted with generators to provide power to on-train equipment. One has been fitted with traction equipment, becoming the experimental Class 19 locomotive.

== Mark 3 DVT ==
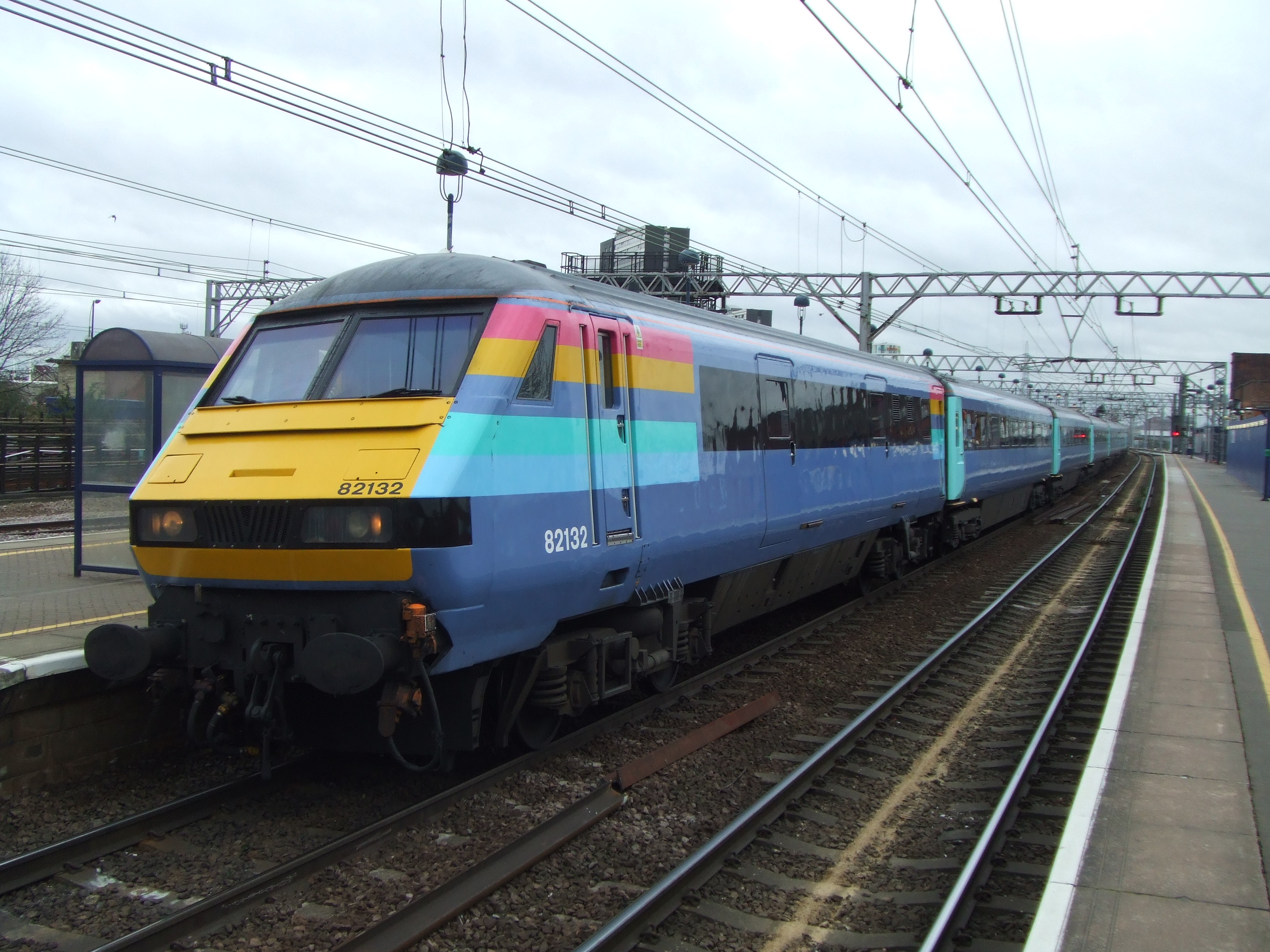
82132 of NXEA in debranded "One" livery departing Stratford on the GEML, 2/08

The driver's desk of a Mk3 DVT

=== InterCity West Coast ===
British Rail Engineering Limited's Derby Litchurch Lane Works built 52 Mark 3 DVTs to operate with Mark 2 and Mark 3 sets in push-pull mode with Class 86, 87 and 90 locomotives on InterCity West Coast Main Line services from London Euston to Wolverhampton, Manchester, Liverpool and Glasgow allowing the retirement of the Class 81, 82, 83, 84 and 85 locomotives. The standard practice was for the DVT to be marshalled at the southern end, adjacent to the first class carriages, to allow easy changeover of locomotives at Willesden depot which is situated at the north end of London Euston station. The first was delivered in March 1989.

They also operated between Wolverhampton and Shrewsbury, and between Crewe and Holyhead, hauled by Class 47 diesel locomotives. Due to a lack of push-pull equipment, these trains would always be headed by the Class 47 and the DVT at the back of the train.

As part of the privatisation of British Rail, all 52 DVTs were sold to the newly created rolling stock leasing company Porterbrook in 1994 and were operated by InterCity West Coast franchise holder Virgin Trains West Coast from 1997 until both the Mark 2 and Mark 3 sets were replaced by Class 390 tilting trains between 2003 and 2005. During 2002, Mark 3 DVTs operated beyond the West Coast Main Line on a summer Saturday service from Manchester to Paignton with a Class 47 hauled Mark 3 set that was hired to Virgin CrossCountry.

Following the loss of a Class 390 Pendolino in the Grayrigg derailment, a Mark 3 set with a Driving Van Trailer was leased with a Class 90 hired from English Welsh & Scottish as required. During 2008, Virgin looked at leasing two Class 180 sets, however, the company decided to retain the Mark 3 set instead. Nicknamed the Pretendolino, this received re-upholstered seating, power points, wi-fi and a full Virgin external repaint at Wabtec, Doncaster in 2009. Virgin used this set with a Class 90 locomotive, hired from Freightliner, on a Euston to Crewe (via Birmingham) service on Fridays only until December 2012. From 9 December 2013, it was utilised to operate a London Euston - Birmingham New Street train on Thursdays and Fridays only, until its withdrawal in October 2014.

=== Greater Anglia ===
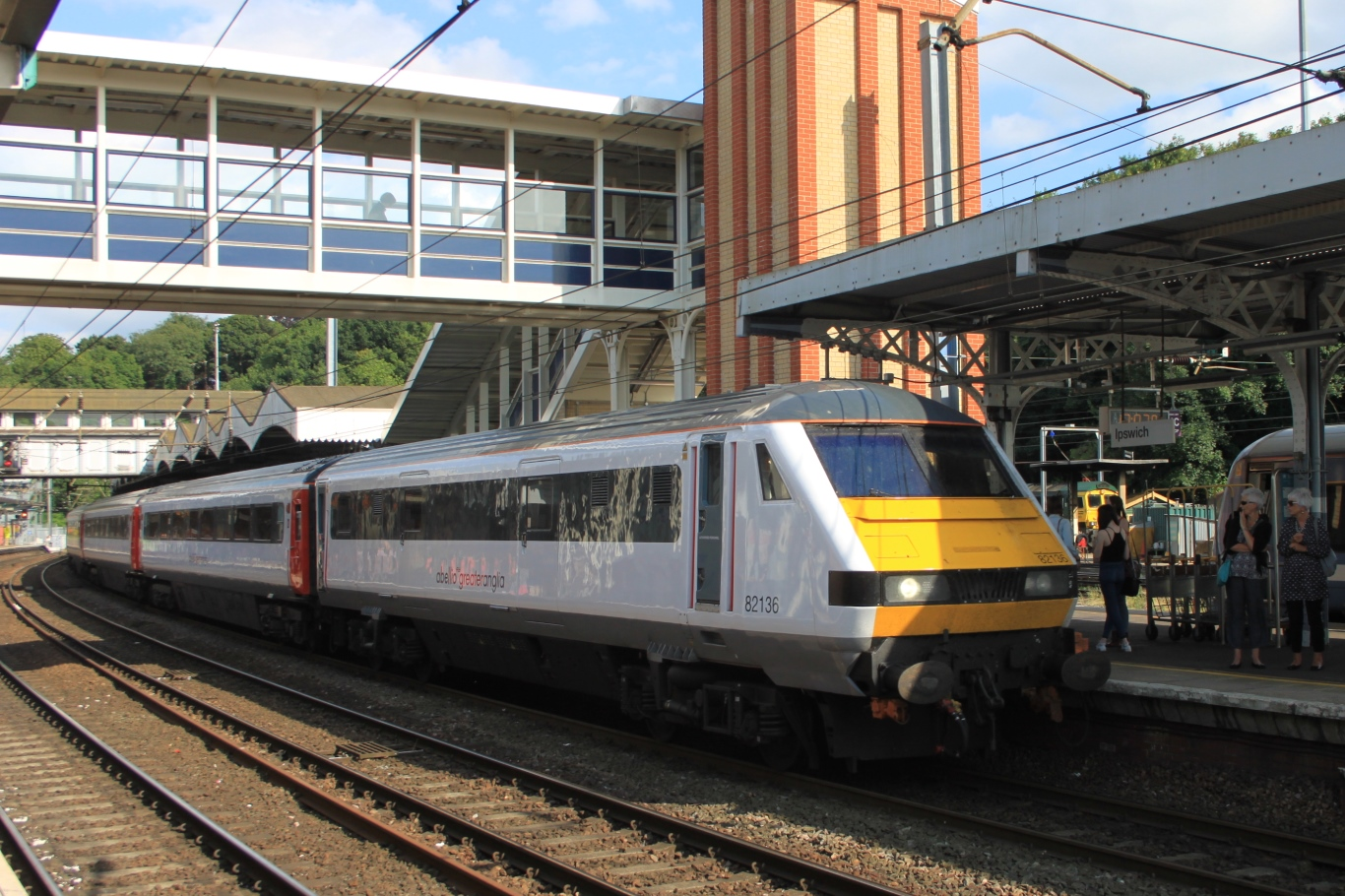
Driving Van Trailer No.82136 at Ipswich

Mark 3 DVTs were introduced along with Mark 3 coach sets and Class 90s to the Greater Anglia franchise by National Express East Anglia, operating on the Great Eastern Main Line from London Liverpool Street to Norwich in 2004. They also were hauled by Class 47s from Norwich to Great Yarmouth on summer Saturday services. It was proposed that kitchens be fitted to the DVTs, but this did not proceed. During 2012, all DVTs were transferred, along with the franchise, to Greater Anglia.

In January 2020, the first Class 745s electric multiple units entered service. Accordingly, the locomotive-hauled sets were promptly withdrawn from service, with the last set running on 24 March 2020.

The standard practice was for the DVT to be marshalled at the northern end, adjacent to the standard class carriages, to facilitate easy changeover of locomotives at Norwich Crown Point depot.

=== Silverlink ===
Between September 2004 and July 2005, Silverlink operated two DVTs in conjunction with Mark 3 and EWS Class 90s on peak-time London Euston to Northampton services.

=== DB Cargo UK ===
EWS purchased DVT 82146 to operate as part of its DB Cargo Company Train that was launched in December 2004.

=== Hull Trains ===
In January 2008, DVT 82115 was hired to Hull Trains to operate services on the East Coast Main Line from London King's Cross to Doncaster, with a set of Cargo-D Mark 3s while it was short of rolling stock.

=== First ScotRail ===
During 2005, the Edinburgh - North Berwick services were operated by English Welsh & Scottish Class 90s with former Virgin Trains Mark 3 carriages and a Driving Van Trailer.

=== Wrexham & Shropshire ===
Wrexham & Shropshire started operating push-pull services with DVTs in October 2008 between London Marylebone and Wrexham General, with Mark 3s and Class 67 diesel locomotives. This followed the start of the service in April 2008, with Class 67s operating in top and tail formation. The DVTs required modification to work with the Class 67, involving adding a notched power controller as is used in the locomotive and a 27 wire jumper cable as used on the locomotives, which is known as the AAR multiple-working system. These were renumbered 82301 to 82305.

Following a reduction in service levels from December 2010, a Mark 3 set was hired to Chiltern Railways to operate a Birmingham Moor Street to London Marylebone peak-hour service. The standard practice was for the DVT to be marshalled at the southern end.

=== Chiltern Railways ===
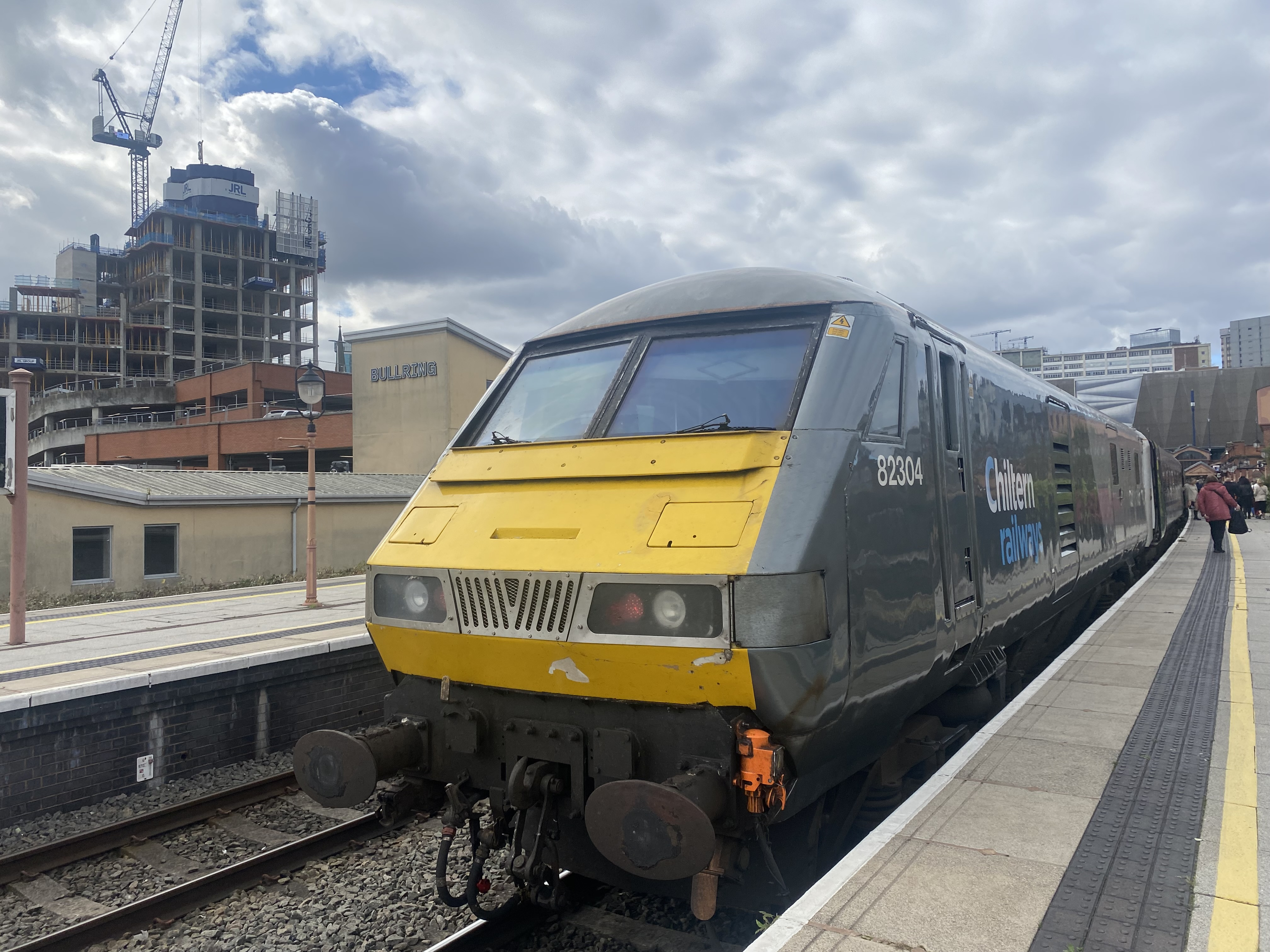
Driving Van Trailer No. 82304 at Birmingham Moor Street in 2024

After Wrexham & Shropshire ceased in January 2011, its fleet of five DVTs were transferred to fellow DB Regio UK company Chiltern Railways and started operating on London Marylebone to Birmingham Snow Hill services with Mark 3s. They were modified to work with the power doors that were fitted to the Mark 3 coaches and to have a generator fitted to enable Electric Train Supply and compressed air to be provided to the coaches when the locomotive is not running, such as when in a terminus station and when stabled. Initially operated with Class 67s, they have been operated with Class 68s since December 2014. Some peak services were extended to Kidderminster. A sixth DVT (82309) was leased to operate with a Mark 3 set on a peak hour service from London Marylebone to Banbury. The standard practice is for the DVT to be marshalled at the southern end.

=== Network Rail ===
During early 2013, several DVTs, including 82111, 82124, 82129, and 82145, were acquired by Network Rail and modified to work with diesel locomotives for use on test trains. Part of the modification work includes the integration of a diesel generator to provide power for on-board systems.

=== Wales & Borders ===
In March 2012, three DVTs (82306-82308) were introduced along with Mark 3s and Class 67s on Arriva Trains Wales' Premier Service from Holyhead to Cardiff. They also operate on services from Crewe and Manchester to Holyhead and Llandudno. All passed with the Wales & Borders franchise to Transport for Wales in October 2018. All were withdrawn in July 2020. In July 2020, 82306 and 82308 were sold to Rail Operations Group.

=== Fleet list ===
Key:	In service	Preserved	Stored	Scrapped	Other use

Original Number	New Number	Name	Operator / owner	Livery	Status	Notes	Picture
82101	–	Wembley Depot Quality Approved‡ 101 Squadron‡	–	Virgin Trains West Coast	Scrapped		
82102	–	–	–	–	Scrapped	Scrapped by Sims, Newport May 2020	
82103	–	–	–	–	Scrapped	Fitted with experimental rail adhesion system (shown in image), scrapped by Sims, Newport May 2020	
82104	82309	–	Chiltern Railways	Chiltern Railways Mainline	In service	Fitted with ETS Generator	
82105	–	–	–	–	Scrapped	Scrapped by Sims, Newport May 2020	
82106	–	–	–	–	Scrapped	Scrapped by CF Booth, Rotherham February 2019	
82107	–	–	–	Greater Anglia	Stored		
82108	82308	–	Rail Operations Group	Arriva Trains Wales	Stored		
82109	–	–	–	–	Scrapped		
82110	–	–	–	Virgin Trains West Coast	Scrapped	Scrapped by CF Booth, Rotherham in 2019 Cab saved	
82111	–	–	Network Rail	Network Rail yellow	Stored	Modified for use on test trains, stored Long Marston	
82112	–	–	–	Greater Anglia	Preserved	Owned by the Mid-Norfolk Railway.	
82113	19001	–	–	Blue	Other use	Converted to Class 19 experimental vehicle at Bo'ness and Kinneil Railway.	
82114	–	–	Northampton & Lamport Railway	Greater Anglia	Preserved	Preserved at the Northampton & Lamport Railway, will be fitted with an ETS Generator. Owned by the Northampton & Lamport Railway Charitable Incorporated Organisation (NLRCIO)	
82115	–	Liverpool John Moores University‡	DATS	BR Blue	Stored	Stored at Leicester	
82116	–	–	–	–	Scrapped	Scrapped by CF Booth, Rotherham after store at Long Marston	
82117	82301	–	Chiltern Railways	Chiltern Railways Mainline	In service	Fitted with ETS Generator	
82118	–	Britannia‡	Crewe Heritage Centre	Greater Anglia	Preserved	Donated for static display	
82119	–	–	–	–	Scrapped	Scrapped at MoD Caerwent, 2005, due to extensive corrosion	
82120	–	Liverpool Chamber of Commerce‡	–	–	Scrapped	Scrapped by CF Booth, Rotherham after store at Long Marston	
82121	–	Carlisle Cathedral‡	Colne Valley Railway	Greater Anglia	Preserved	Preserved at Colne Valley Railway	
82122	–	–	–	–	Scrapped	Scrapped by CF Booth, Rotherham in 2019	
82123	–	–	–	–	Scrapped	Scrapped by CF Booth, Rotherham in 2019	
82124	–	The Girls' Brigade‡	Network Rail	Network Rail yellow	Stored	Modified for use on test trains, stored at Long Marston	
82125	–	–	Private Owner	Virgin Trains West Coast (repainted front)	Preserved	Used as a support carriage since 2019 at the Mid Norfolk Railway	
82126	–	Wembley Traincare Depot‡	–	Virgin Trains West Coast silver	Scrapped		
82127	-	Abraham Darby‡	Locomotive Services Limited	Intercity	Stored		
82128	–	–	–	–	Scrapped	Scrapped by CF Booth, Rotherham December 2012	
82129	–	–	Network Rail	Network Rail yellow	Stored	Modified for use on test trains, stored at Long Marston	
82130	82304	–	Chiltern Railways	Chiltern Railways Mainline	In service	Fitted with ETS Generator	
82131	82307	–	Transport for Wales	Arriva Trains Wales	Stored		.
82132	–	West Midlands Industry '96‡	–	–	Scrapped	Scrapped by Sims, Newport May 2020	
82133	–	–	–	Greater Anglia	Preserved	Owned by the Mid-Norfolk Railway	
82134	82305	–	Chiltern Railways	Chiltern Railways Mainline	In service	Fitted with ETS Generator	
82135	82303	Spirit of Cumbria‡	Chiltern Railways	Chiltern Railways Mainline	In service	Fitted with ETS Generator. Used as parts donor.	
82136	–	–	DATS	Greater Anglia	Stored	Stored at Leicester.	
82137	–	–	–	–	Scrapped	Scrapped by CF Booth, Rotherham after store at Long Marston	
82138	–	–	–	Virgin Trains West Coast	Preserved	Located on the Great Central Railway.	
82139	–	–	Locomotive Services Limited	InterCity Swallow	In service	For charter use with 86101, 87002, 90001 and 90002	
82140	–	–	–	–	Scrapped	Scrapped by CF Booth, Rotherham January 2015	
82141	–	–	–	–	Scrapped	Scrapped by CF Booth, Rotherham after store at Long Marston	
82142	–	–	–	–	Scrapped		
82143	–	–	Greater Manchester Fire and Rescue Service	Greater Anglia	Other use	Training vehicle for fire-fighters	
82144	82306	–	–	Arriva Trains Wales	Preserved	Located on the Great Central Railway	
82145	–	–	Network Rail	Network Rail yellow	Stored	Modified for use on test trains, stored at Long Marston.	
82146	–	–	DB Cargo UK	DB Cargo UK silver	In service		
82147	–	The Red Devils‡	–	–	Scrapped		
82148	–	International Spring Fair‡	–	–	Scrapped	Scrapped by CF Booth, Rotherham after store at Long Marston	
82149	–	101 Squadron‡	–	–	Scrapped	Scrapped at Sims, Newport in 2022	
82150	–	–	–	Virgin Trains West Coast	Stored	Stored at Long Marston, no longer Network Rail registered	
82151	82302	–	Chiltern Railways	Chiltern Railways Mainline	In service	Fitted with ETS Generator.	
82152	–	–	–	–	Scrapped	Scrapped by Sims, Newport May 2020	

- ‡ – DVT has been denamed

== Mark 4 DVT ==
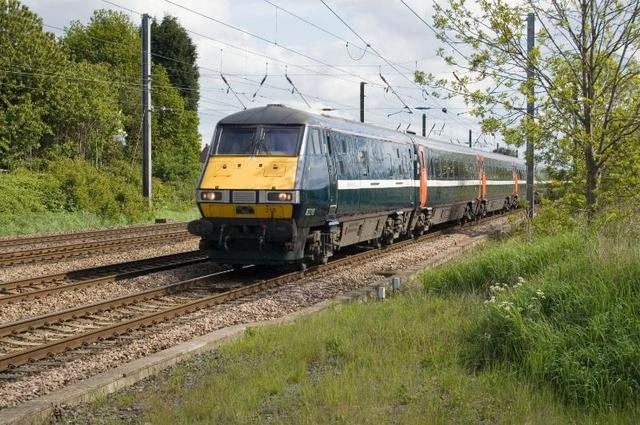
NXEC Mark 4 DVT on the East Coast Main Line

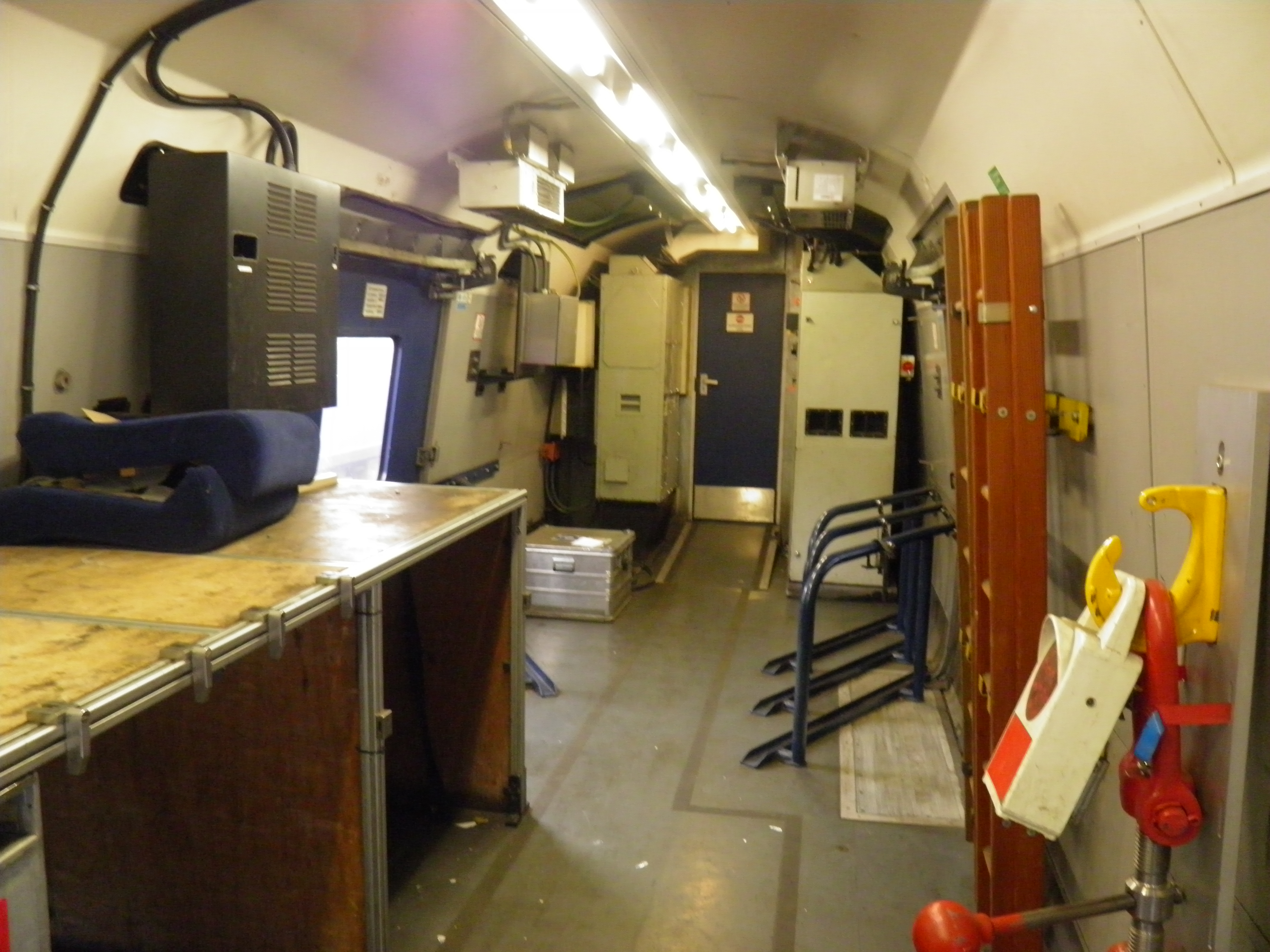
Inside of a London North Eastern Railway Mark 4 DVT.

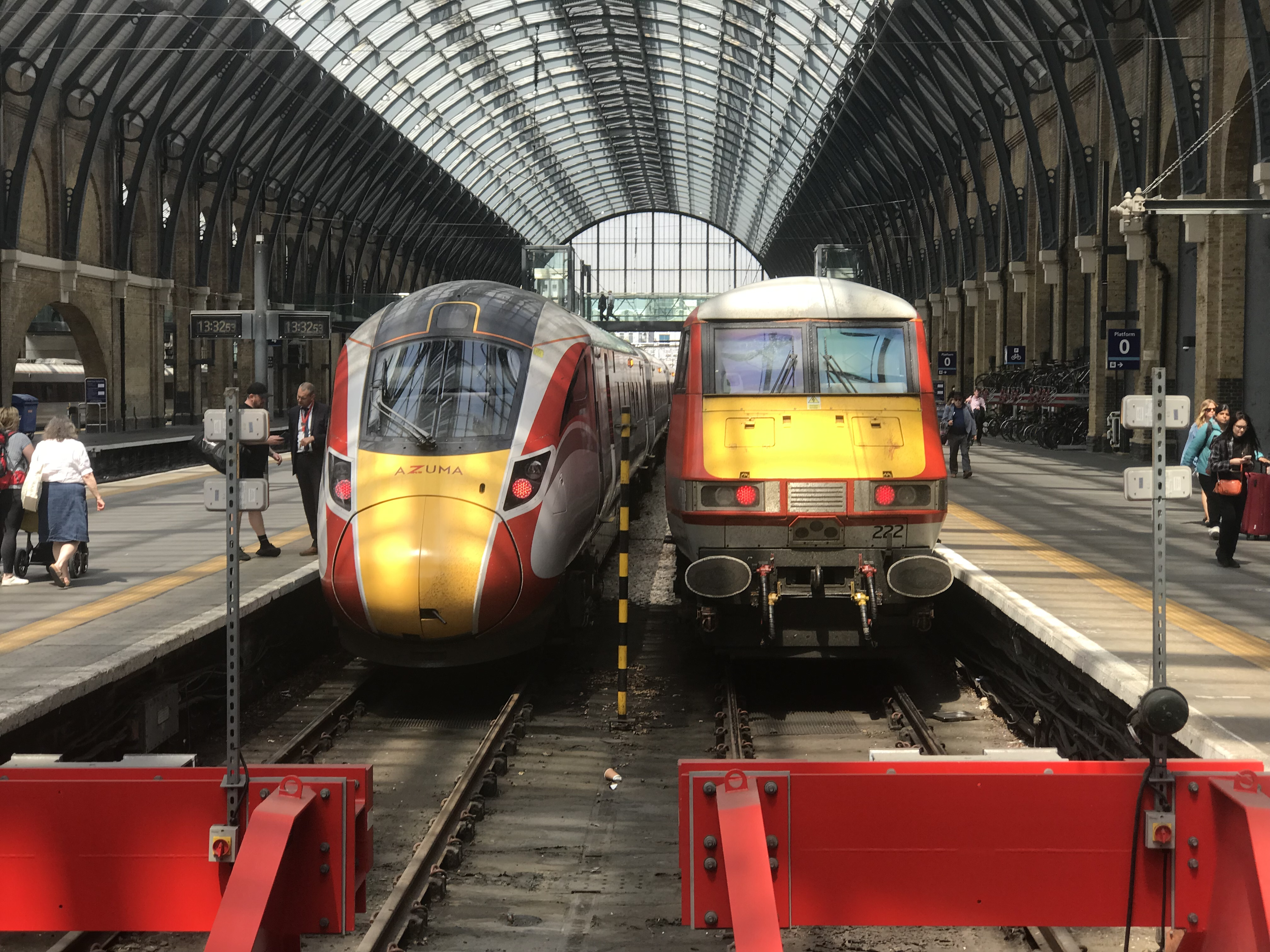
DVT No. 222 stands alongside a Class 801 at London King's Cross

As part of the electrification of the East Coast Main Line from London King's Cross to Leeds, Edinburgh and Glasgow, 32 Mark 4 DVTs were built by Metro-Cammell at their Washwood Heath facility for inclusion in InterCity 225 sets. The bodyshells were manufactured under sub-contract by Breda in Italy. They operate with Class 91 locomotives using the TDM system via UIC screened cables through the nine Mark 4 coaches of the rake. They have also operated with Class 89 and Class 90 locomotives.

=== InterCity East Coast ===
All entered service with InterCity. As part of the privatisation of British Rail, all 32 were sold to Eversholt Rail Group in 1994 and were operated by successive InterCity East Coast franchise holders GNER, National Express East Coast, East Coast, Virgin Trains East Coast and LNER. In February 2001, 82221 was damaged in the Great Heck rail crash and subsequently scrapped. The standard practice is for the DVT to be marshalled at the southern end, adjacent to the first class carriages, to facilitate easy changeover of locomotives at Bounds Green and subsequently Neville Hill depots at the north end of King's Cross and Leeds stations respectively.

With the delivery of Class 800 and Class 801, mass withdrawals commenced in May 2019. Originally it was proposed that all the InterCity 225 sets be withdrawn by the end of 2020, but LNER decided to retain 10 sets until at least December 2021 to allow it to increase services. A limited number of sets will continue to operate in the new May 2022 timetable.

=== Grand Central ===
Grand Central would have used Mk4 coaches and DVTs on London Euston to Blackpool North services with Class 90 locomotives hauling six-carriage sets; however, these services were permanently abandoned on 10 September 2020, due to the negative effects of COVID-19 on passenger numbers All five were sold to Transport for Wales during 2021.

=== Transport for Wales ===
Transport for Wales introduced three four-car Mark 4 sets with Mark 4 DVTs on the Premier Service from Holyhead to Cardiff in September 2021. In 2021, Transport for Wales Rail purchased these three sets along with five more that had been recently overhauled for Grand Central.

=== Grand Union ===
Grand Union proposed using Class 91 locomotives with Mk4 coaches and DVTs on its services from London Paddington to Cardiff Central and from London Euston to Stirling. In February 2021, the Welsh application was rejected.

=== Fleet list ===
Key:	In service	Stored	Scrapped

Number	Name	Operator	Livery	Status	Notes	Image
82200		Transport for Wales	Commemorative Remembrance Day livery	Stored	Was involved in the Hatfield rail crash.	
82201		Transport for Wales		In Service		
82202		–	–	Scrapped	Scrapped at Sims Metal, Newport	
82203		-	-	Scrapped	Scrapped at Sims Metal Hull, 2020	
82204		Transport for Wales		Stored	Stored at Harry Needle Railroad Company, Worksop	
82205	Flying Scotswoman (denamed)	LNER	LNER	In service		
82206		Transport for Wales		Stored	Stored at Harry Needle Railroad Company, Worksop	
82207		LNER	LNER	Stored	Moved to Sims Metal, Newport 17 June 2021	
82208		LNER	LNER	In service		
82209		LNER	LNER	Scrapped		
82210		Harry Needle Railroad Company		Stored	Stored at Harry Needle Railroad Company, Worksop	
82211		LNER	LNER	In service		
82212		LNER	LNER	In service		
82213		LNER	LNER	In service		
82214		LNER	LNER	In service		
82215		LNER	LNER	In service		
82216		TFW	TFW	In service		
82217		–	–	Scrapped	Scrapped at Sims Metal, Hull July 2020	
82218		Harry Needle Railroad Company		Stored	Stored at Harry Needle Railroad Company, Worksop	
82219		-	-	Scrapped	Scrapped at Sims Metal, Newport	
82220		LNER	LNER	Stored	Stored at Landore TMD	
82221		–	–	Scrapped	Scrapped after colliding with a coal train in the Great Heck rail crash on 28 February 2001	
82222		LNER	LNER	In service		
82223		LNER	LNER	In service		
82224		LNER	LNER	Stored	Moved to Sims Metals, Hull 1 April 2021	
82225		LNER	LNER	In service		
82226		Transport for Wales	Transport for Wales (Wales Air Ambulance special livery)	In service	Previously stored at Cardiff Canton. Wrapped in 2021 to promote Alzheimer's Society Cymru; (since replaced)	
82227		Transport for Wales	Grand Central	In service		
82228		-	-	Scrapped	Scrapped at Sims Metal, Hull September 2020	
82229		Transport for Wales	Transport for Wales	In service		
82230		Transport for Wales	Grand Central	In service		
82231		LNER	LNER	Stored	Stored at Harry Needle Railroad Company, Worksop	

== Mark 5 DVT ==
The Mark 5 DVT was to be part of British Rail's ill-fated InterCity 250 project on the West Coast Main Line. This would have resembled the proposed Class 93 locomotive, but contain a driving cab, along with seating for standard class passengers and a small guard compartment.

== Accidents and incidents ==
Across three decades of operations, the DVT has been involved in three serious accidents. These include the Hatfield rail crash of October 2000, which involved DVT 82200, and the Great Heck rail crash of February 2001, which involving DVT 82221. In the latter incident, the DVT sustained major damage, which led it to being withdrawn from service and scrapped. Neither accident were caused by the DVT.

DVT 82229 was operating as part of a Transport for Wales service on 22nd May 2025, when it collided with a trailer being towed by a tractor near Leominster. It sustained significant damage as a result. A 32 year old man was arrested for causing the collision.

== See also ==
- Cab (locomotive)
- Control car (rail)
- Control stand
- Push–pull train
- Driving Brake Standard Open
