= Sims Metal Management =

Global environmental services conglomerate

Sims Metal
- Type: Public
- Traded as: ASX: SGM
- Industry: Metal recycling
- Founded: 1917
- Founder: Albert Sims
- Headquarters: Sydney, Australia
- Key people: Stephen Mikkelsen (CEO); Philip Bainbridge (Chairman)
- Products: Ferrous and Non-ferrous Secondary Metals
- Revenue: $7.4 billion (2025)
- Operating income: $69 million (2025)
- Website: www.simsmm.com

Sims Metal is a global environmental services conglomerate, operating through a number of divisions, with a focus on: (a) Ferrous and Non-ferrous metal recycling, (b) enterprise data destruction and cloud asset management (c) post-consumer electronic goods recycling and reuse, (d) municipal waste recycling, (e) gas to energy, and (f) waste to energy. Founded in 1917, its primary operations are located in the United States, Australia and the UK.

== History ==
Former Sims Metal Management logo

Sims Metal Management was established in 1917 by Albert Sims, a recycled metals dealer in Sydney, Australia. The business was incorporated as Albert G. Sims Limited in 1928 and was renamed Simsmetal Limited in November 1968. In November 1970, Sims merged with Consolidated Metal Products Limited and the merged Australian Securities Exchange listed company was named Sims Consolidated Limited. In May 1979, Sims Consolidated Limited was acquired by Peko-Wallsend and delisted.

In February 1988, Sims entered the US scrap recycling market through the acquisition of LMC Corporation, located in the state of California. In August 1988, Sims Consolidated Limited was included in the purchase of Peko-Wallsend by North Limited. In 1989, North Limited sold the business to Elders Resources NZFP Limited, a diversified resources company. In 1990, Carter Holt Harvey made a successful takeover bid for Elders Resources NZFP Limited and divested that company's non-forestry businesses, which included Sims. Sims changed its name to Simsmetal Limited in 1990 and relisted on the Australian Securities Exchange in November 1991.

In August 1992, Sims expanded its presence in New Zealand through the merger of its business there with the ferrous recycling operations owned by Pacific Steel Industries, a Fletcher Building company. This joint venture, known as Sims Pacific Metals Limited, operates throughout New Zealand.

In February 1995, Sims acquired a 51% ownership interest in Sims Bird Limited in the UK, which was its first major entry in the UK scrap metal market. The company acquired the remaining 49% of Sims Bird Limited in May 1998. In April 2000, Sims acquired Phillip Services (Europe) Limited in the UK, which significantly increased its presence in that market.

In November 2002, Simsmetal Limited changed its name to Sims Group Limited. In October 2005, the company merged with entities operating certain of the recycling businesses of Hugo Neu Corporation, a privately owned US corporation. This merger provided Sims with a significant presence in southern California, New York and New Jersey.

In September 2007, Sims sold its Southern California business into a joint venture with Adams Steel. The joint venture, SA Recycling, is operated by Adams Steel and is one of the largest recyclers in the US operating over one hundred fifty facilities in fifteen states.

On 14 March 2008, Sims issued 53.5 million American depositary receipts (ADRs), with a face value of A$1.5 billion, to purchase the issued capital of Metal Management Inc. (MMI) in the US. MMI was one of the leading full-service scrap metal recyclers in the US, with locations in 17 US states. The acquisition was designed to strengthen Sims' position in the North American scrap recycling market, increase the opportunity to be a supplier of raw materials to US steel mills, and expand its presence in non-ferrous products. The acquisition was complementary, because Sims' operations in North America were primarily export-focused, while MMI's operations were primarily domestic-focused, and included a large non-ferrous recycling business. The acquisition of MMI in March 2008 created the world's leading publicly traded recycling company. In November 2008, shareholders approved the changes of the corporate name to Sims Metal Management Limited.

== Divisions ==
=== Metals Recycling ===
Sims Metal Management buys ferrous metal from metal dealers, peddlers, auto wreckers, demolition firms and others who generate obsolete metal and from manufacturers who generate industrial metal. Ferrous metal is processed for resale using a variety of methods, including sorting, shredding, cutting, torching, baling or breaking. After processing, ferrous recycled metal is sold to end users such as EAF mills, integrated steel mill, foundries and brokers.

Sims sources non-ferrous metals from manufacturers, known as production offcuts, and from generators of electricity, telecommunication service providers and others who generate obsolete metal. Peddlers and metal dealers, who collect from a variety of sources, also deliver material directly to their facilities. In addition, the company generates significant quantities of non-ferrous metal as a byproduct.

Sims Metal Management operates a geographically diverse network of processing facilities, with numerous deep-water port access, supported by an extensive network of feeder yards which source recyclable ferrous and non-ferrous metals. Sims Metal Management today has over 130 physical operations in North America, 57 in Australasia, and more than 37 locations in the United Kingdom and Continental Europe.

=== Electronics Recycling ===
Sims Recycling Solutions (SRS) is the company's electronics recycling division. This includes product de-manufacturing and processing operations, and commonly is referred to as e-recycling. SRS offers comprehensive and cost-effective recycling services for “end-of-life” and redundant electrical and electronic equipment and materials, ranging from product assessment to recycling. SRS provides services for original equipment manufacturers, contract equipment manufacturers, suppliers, importers, lease and finance companies, sector organisations and end users to enable them to comply with their responsibilities under relevant environmental regulations, including the European Union's Directive 2002/96/EC on Waste Electrical and Electronic Equipment, or the WEEE Directive. Additionally, SRS offers business-to-business IT and electronic equipment asset management and recovery service that operates across a global network. The company's services include the management and control of the entire asset management process, including transport, coordination, product identification, asset registration and reporting. SRS offers clients the option of redeployment, reclamation of parts and/or resale and recycling, delivering legal compliance as well as a potential financial return from the resale of refurbished equipment.

SRS has 42 facilities operating globally offering a range of services including the collection, refurbishment and re-sale of working equipment, parts recovery for resale, mechanised testing and processing of monitors, mechanical recycling of e-recycling and secondary smelting and refining of high grade electronics by-product materials. Sims recycling facilities in the UK specialise in fragmenting domestic and commercial fridges, as well IT asset management solutions. SRS locations in Australasia address the growing social and environmental problem represented by end-of-life computers and other information technology equipment with locations in Australia, India, Dubai, and South Africa.

=== Municipal Recycling ===
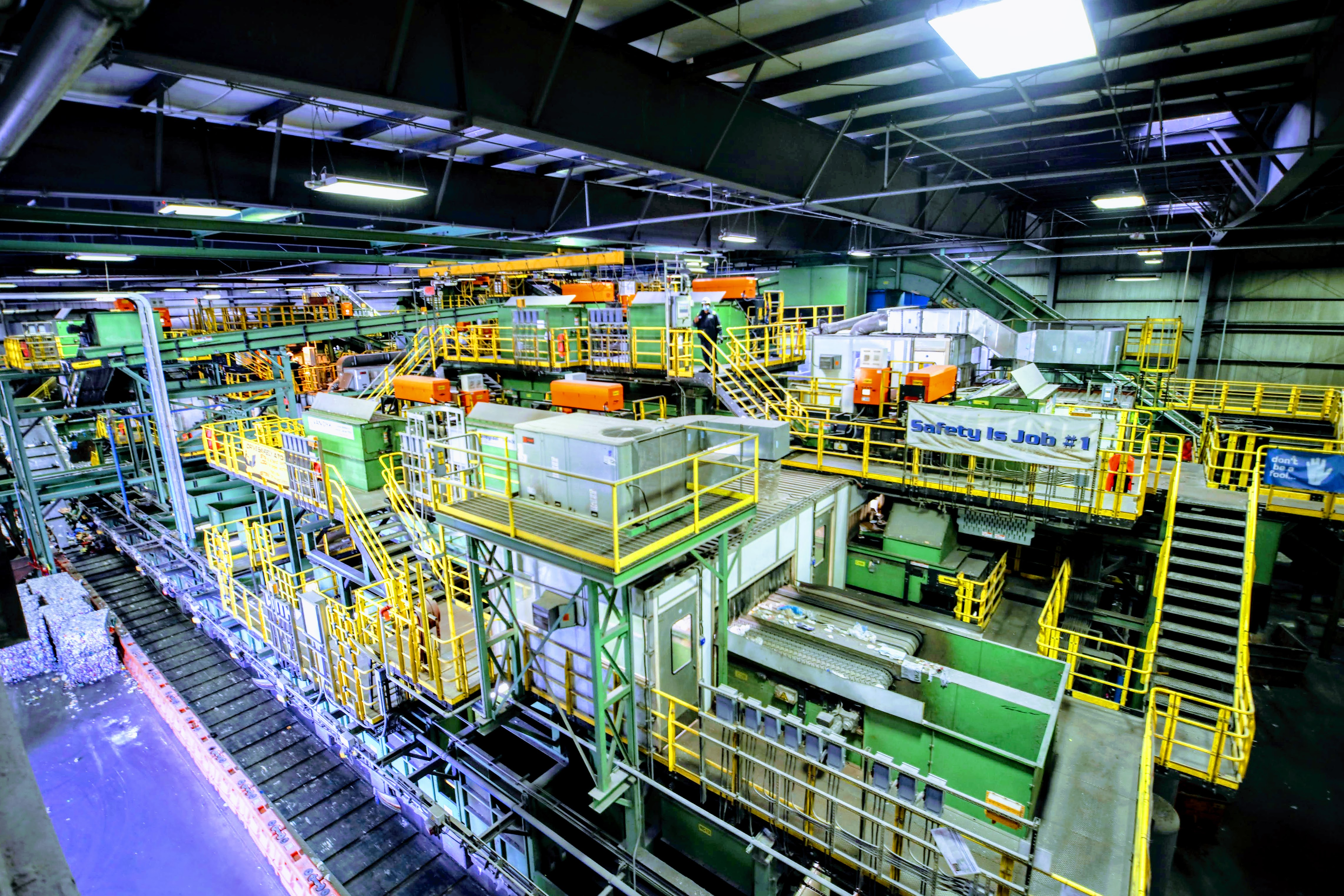
Bollegraaf Recycling combine in Sunset Park, Brooklyn, NYC

Sims Metal Management also recycles post-consumer materials through a 20-year recycling contract with the New York City Department of Sanitation, which became effective in January 2009. Under this contract, the company is responsible for all curb-side recycling material, including all plastic, glass and metal on behalf of the City of New York. Packer trucks owned and operated by New York City deliver recyclables as a 26 commingled product to the company's facilities. The commingled product then is processed using a series of screens, magnets, eddy currents, optical sorters and conveyors. The recyclables are separated and sorted into ferrous and non-ferrous metals, different plastic resins, glass and residue. Then the recycled materials are shipped to US and non-US markets.

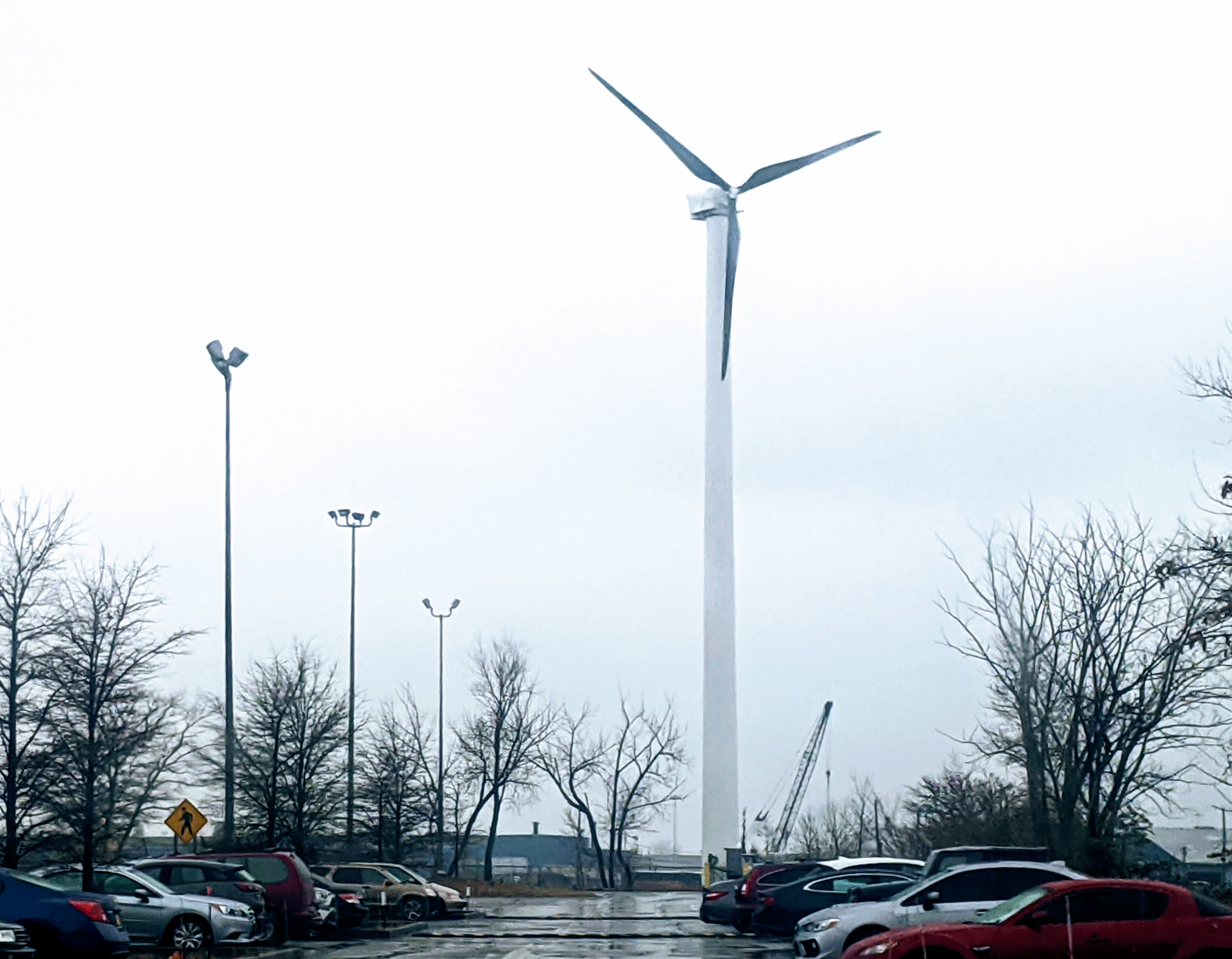
SouthBrooklyn Marine Terminal Wind Turbine 02

In December 2013, Sims Metal Management opened a recycling facility at the South Brooklyn Marine Terminal on the Upper New York Bay in Sunset Park, Brooklyn. Sims Municipal Recycling (SMR) managed construction of a new 11-acre recycling center on the Brooklyn waterfront from 2010 to 2013. SMR worked with geotechnical engineers to develop structural fill blends using "mole rock" from NYC tunnelling projects mixed with recycled glass aggregate (RGA). More than 5,000 tons of RGA were blended with 20,000 tons of mole rock and used to elevate sections of the site by 4 feet, thereby protecting buildings and equipment against sea level rise and storm surges.

== Environmental Sustainability ==
The energy savings generated by Sims Metal Management were in excess of 14.3 million MWh, enough to power around 4.3 million average households. Saving this energy also prevented the emission of 15.2 million metric tons of CO_{2} to the atmosphere, equivalent to that absorbed by 15 million trees over a 100-year life span.

In 2013, Sims Metal Management was nominated as one of the world's 100 most sustainable companies at the World Economic Forum in Davos, Switzerland for the fifth Year in a row. The company also joined as an Index Component in the World Index of the Dow Jones Sustainability Index (DJSI). Sims has participated in numerous voluntary sustainability disclosures including the Carbon Disclosure Project for the past eight years and the Carbon Disclosure Project's Water Disclosure initiative for the past three years. The company was also recently added to the Euronext Vigeo World 120 index for exemplary corporate social responsibility.

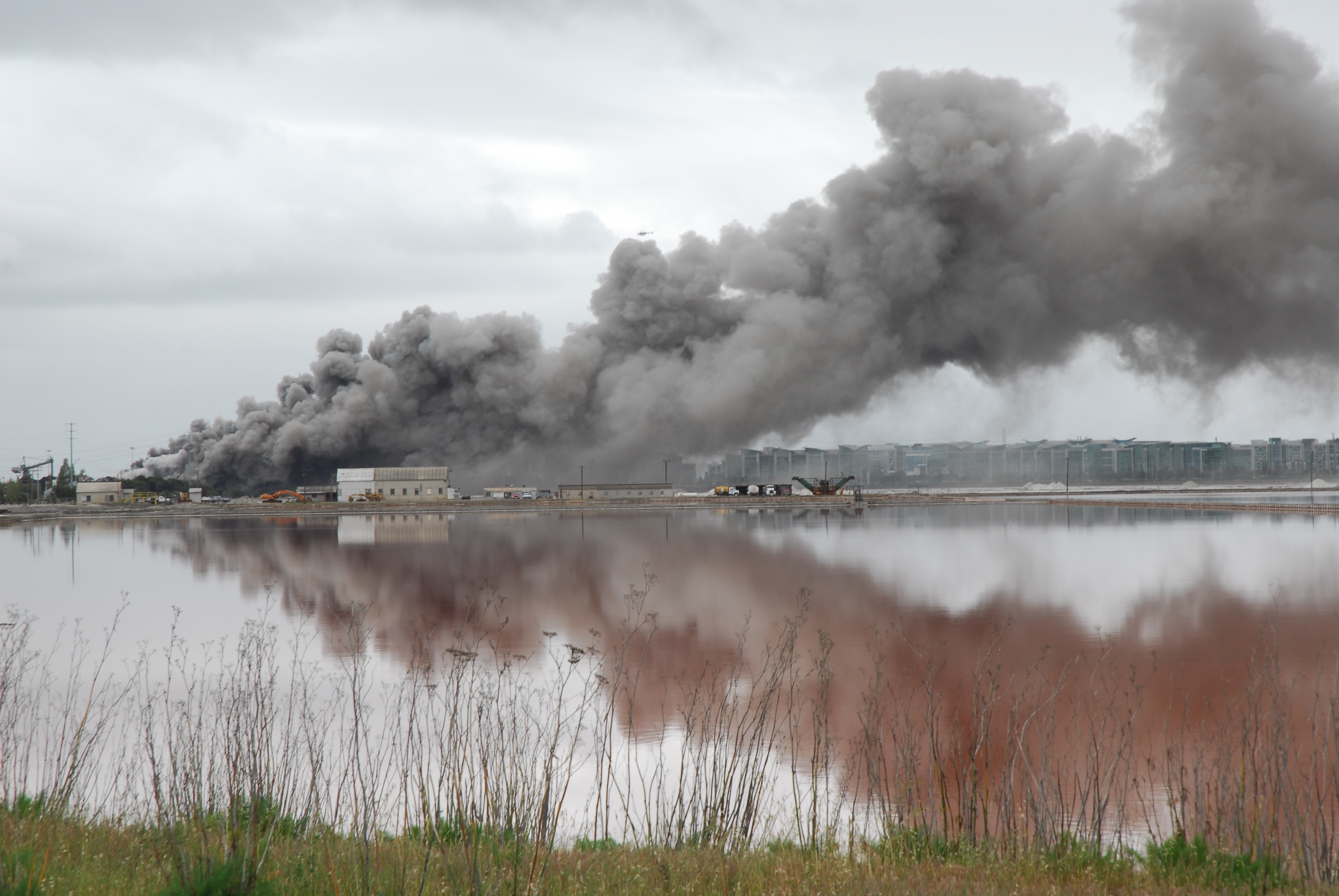
Redwood City Fire

Sims is heavily focused on reducing the potential risk of fire at their scrap metal recycling facilities. In light of the stockpiled material fires which occurred in 2013 at the company's Redwood City, California and Jersey City, New Jersey locations, Sims has considered factors such as stockpile size and the use of technology, such as heat sensors.

== See also ==
- List of oldest companies in Australia
