= InterCity 250 =

Cancelled electric railway project

- Artist's impression of a Class 93 locomotive
Type and origin
- Power type: Electric
- Build date: 1992—1995 (Proposed but never built)
- Total produced: 30 nine-carriage units (planned)
Specifications
- Configuration
  - UIC: Bo′Bo′+2′2′+...+2′2′+2′2′
Performance figures
- Maximum speed: 155 mph (250 km/h) (Design); 125 mph (200 km/h) (Initial Service)
- Power output: 7,400 hp (5.5 MW)
Career
- Operators: British Rail
- Disposition: Project cancelled in July 1992

The InterCity 250 was an electric railway project undertaken by British Rail in the late 1980s. The InterCity 250 train would have consisted of a Class 93 electric locomotive, nine Mark 5 coaches and a Mark 5 Driving Van Trailer operating in a push-pull formation. The British Rail project was cancelled in July 1992.

== History ==
In 1985, work began to fully electrify the East Coast Main Line (ECML). This project, which saw the line fitted with overhead wires between London King's Cross and Edinburgh Waverley, took five years to complete. At the same time, a new generation of rolling stock was introduced, with the Class 91 electric locomotives combined with the Mark 4 coaching stock to form InterCity 225 sets – so called because the Class 91 locomotives had a top speed of 225 km/h (140 mph).

Upon the completion of the ECML project, British Rail turned to the West Coast Main Line (WCML). This had been electrified in several stages over a fifteen-year period between 1959 and 1974. However, unlike the ECML the extensive curvature of the track along the route meant that it was ill-suited to running high-speed trains (generally defined in Britain as trains capable of 125 miles per hour or 200 kilometres per hour or more), and so its services were limited to more modest speeds of 100 to 110 miles per hour (160 to 175 km/h). In order to achieve the same standards as the ECML, major upgrades of the track, signalling and overhead lines, as well as a new generation of rolling stock, were required.

During the late 1970s, British Rail had planned to address the WCML limitations with the Advanced Passenger Train project; this circumvented any requirement to make significant infrastructure changes by using tilting train technology. The project reached the prototype stage, with the introduction of three Class 370 electric multiple units into passenger service in 1981. However, initial failures of the tilt technology led to them being withdrawn. They were then used from 1984 to 1986 as test trains for researching the technologies and specifications required for what would become the Class 91.

== Project scope ==
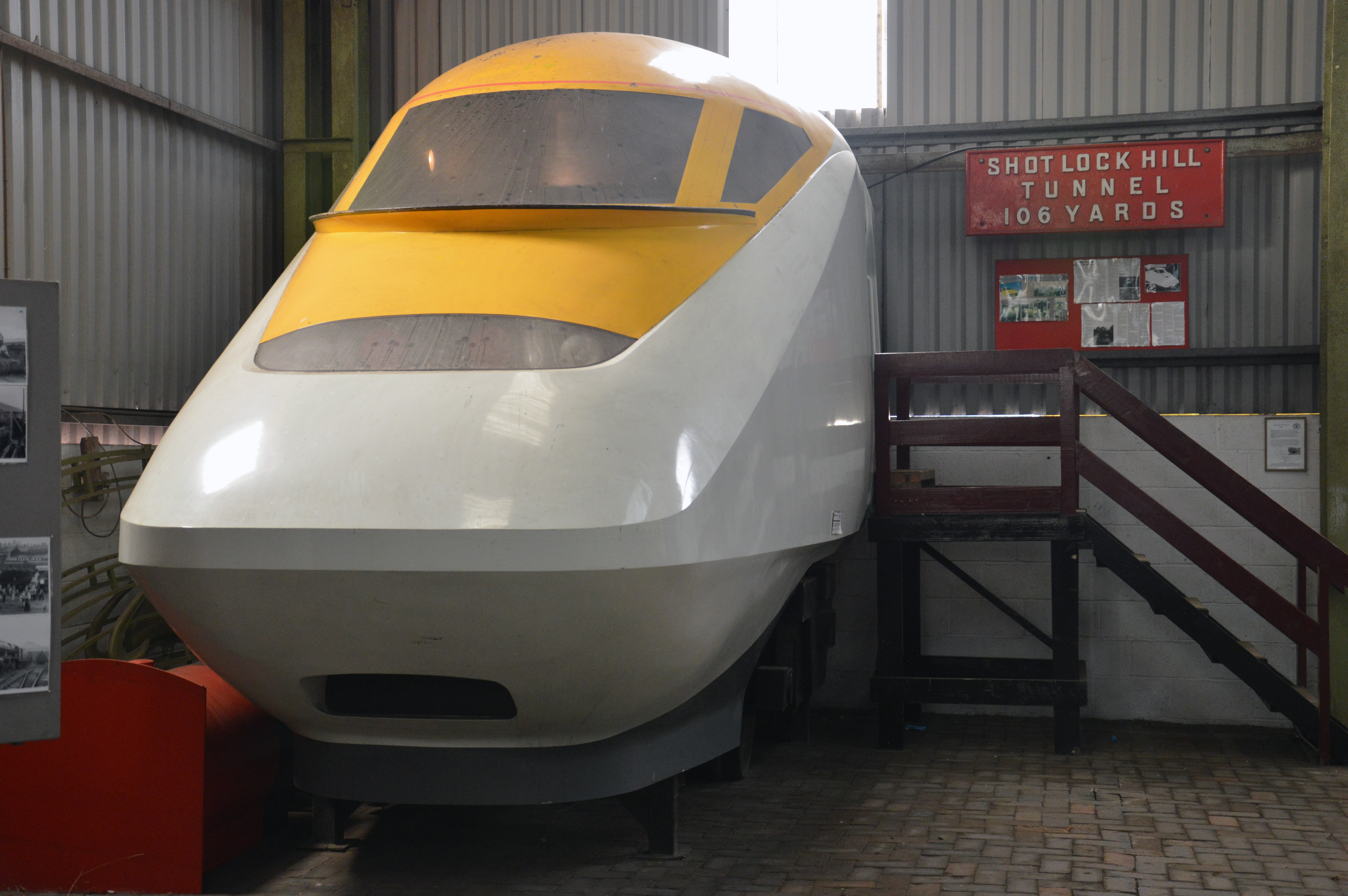
Class 93 cab mockup

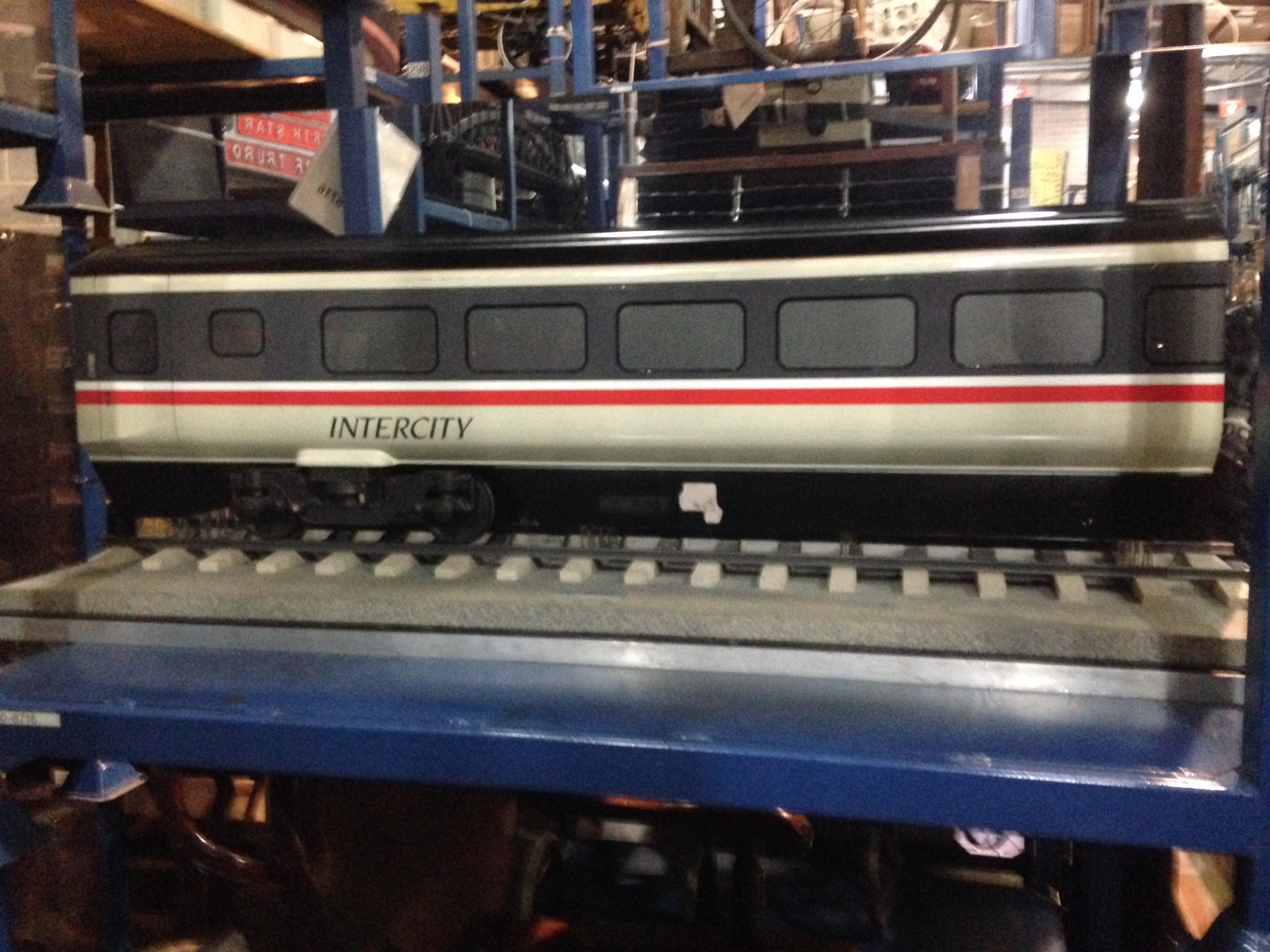
Model of Mark 5 coach

In November 1990, after several years of internal evaluation and development of business and technical specifications, British Rail announced the InterCity 250 project. This would address the problems on the WCML through the delivery of new rolling stock and enhanced infrastructure required to operate them. The proposal came at a time when journey time improvements on the West Coast Main Line were needed to increase revenue and improve InterCity's profitability. However the West Coast Main Line infrastructure at the time was incapable of supporting operation of 155 miles per hour (250 km/h) trains in normal service and in need of widespread renewal, therefore a number of factors would be required to deliver this:

- Route re-alignment (including the possibility of bypassing highly curved sections of line at the southern end of the WCML - such as the curves at Berkhamsted, Wolverton and Weedon - by using the trackbed of the former Great Central Railway between London and Rugby which was later rejected, and diversion of the Up & Down Fast Lines through Wolverton station via a line adjacent to Wolverton Works on the former alignment of the London & North Western Railway).
- Increase of the maximum cant on curves from six to eight degrees (150 mm to 200 mm) following research into seated passenger comfort on the Midland Main Line during the 1980s.
- Improved track quality and potential active suspension fitted to the Mark 5 coaches to improve passenger comfort, and reduce track wear, by lowering vertical "P2" forces when exceeding 125 mph (200 km/h).
- Resignalling of the West Coast Main Line between London Euston and Crewe incorporating Automatic Train Protection (ATP) - then under development by British Rail - to deliver operating speeds in excess of 125 mph (200 km/h).
- Modifications or construction of new tunnel shafts where these posed an aerodynamic limit on speeds
- An enhanced traction power supply system with extensive modifications to the existing Mk1 & Mk3A OLE, operating on a 25-0-25 kV (50 kV) Auto-Transformer Feeder System (ATFS).
- 30 new non-tilting train sets capable of up to 155 mph (250 km/h) (certain sources quote 160 mph or 255 km/h).

Concept models for the Class 93 locomotives for the InterCity 250 were styled by Seymour Powell and invitations to build the rolling stock were called for with GEC-Alsthom, Bombardier, Prorail, and an ABB/British Rail Engineering Limited joint venture responding.

It was planned the InterCity 250 trains would have commenced operating at 125 miles per hour (200 km/h) around 1995, with incremental increases up to the maximum speed by the end of the 1990s following the implementation of in-cab signalling. The ECML high speed test site between Stoke Tunnel and New England North, used in the trial runs of the InterCity 225, was likely to have been used in the development and testing of a prototype InterCity 250 set. In 1993 it was suggested that the InterCity 250 could provide a suitable specification for future replacement rolling stock on both the Great Western and East Coast Main Lines.

In total the project was valued at around £750 million, with each InterCity 250 set estimated to cost £10 million (1992 prices).

== Cancellation ==
Due to the impact of the 1990s recession rolling stock orders placed by other sectors of British Rail led to a shortage of funding which saw many projects suspended or scrapped. Together with the impending privatisation of British Rail this led to the InterCity 250 project being abandoned in July 1992.

A later proposal in 1993 for the procurement of a follow-on set of ten InterCity 225 units for priority express operations on the WCML was not pursued on the basis that it was unable to deliver a commercially viable return on investment and exposed the suppliers (GEC Transportation) to excessive financial risk. Existing operations by Class 86/87/90 and Mark 2/3 stock would have been cascaded onto non-express services and branded "InterCity 175". The bid by BR was also hampered by a lack of available manufacturers, as Metro-Cammell and BREL were by that time heavily committed to production of the Class 365/465/466 units for Network SouthEast.

== Legacy ==
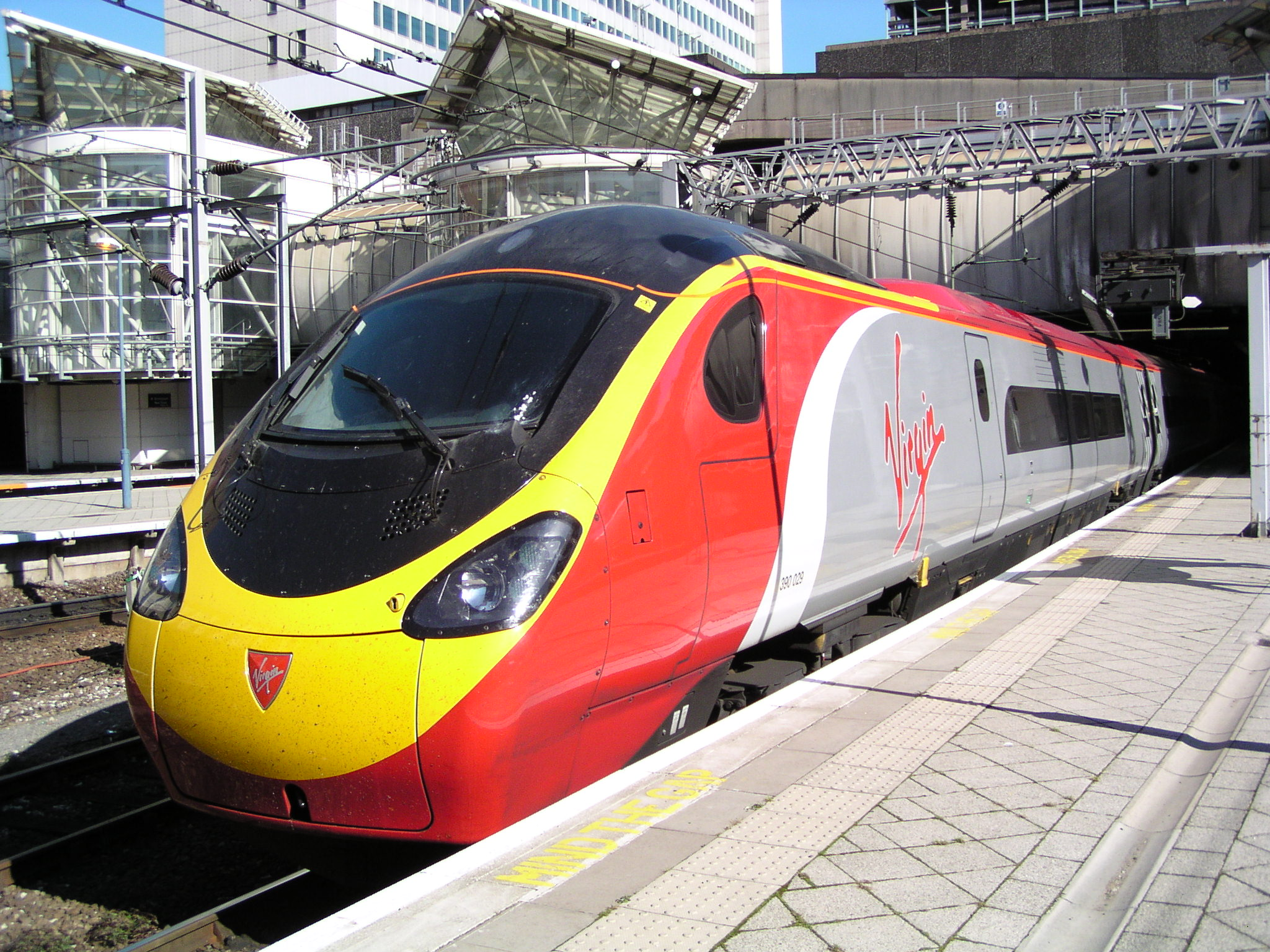
The modernised West Coast Main Line now uses ‘Pendolino’ stock

Although InterCity 250 was cancelled, the improvements to the WCML were still required and were campaigned for by the West Coast Rail 250 pressure group. Following the privatisation of British Rail in 1994, the newly formed rail infrastructure company Railtrack drew up plans for track and signalling upgrades to allow for high-speed running, which it budgeted at £2 billion. The predicted journey times for upgraded speeds of 125 and 140 mph (200 and 225 km/h) over the existing 110 mph (175 km/h) maximum linespeed were based upon the calculated InterCity 250 performance over the WCML supplied by British Rail (Derby).

The first phase of the upgrade, between London Euston and Manchester was completed in 2004; however, work at several sites including Rugby and Milton Keynes stations, the Trent Valley and the remainder of the route to Glasgow continued until December 2008. Virgin Trains ordered 53 Class 390 Pendolino electric multiple units. These are seen as the successor to the original APT concept, in that they utilise tilting technology to successfully negotiate the route of the WCML at high speed. Though infrastructure limitations presently limit them to 125 mph (201 km/h), the trains are capable of speeds up to 140 mph (225 km/h).

A full-size mock-up of the front end and cab of a Class 93 power car was made and displayed at the Eurailspeed 92 exhibition in Brussels. It is now at the Midland Railway Centre.
