= Virgin Trains (brand) =

Virgin Trains is a brand name that has been used by several Virgin Group railway operators.

== Background ==
The Virgin Group first showed interest in operating rail services in 1992 when it discussed with British Rail the possibility of operating luxury trains on the East Coast Main Line from London to Edinburgh and Glasgow with four hired InterCity 225 sets. Nothing came of it.

== Virgin Rail Group ==
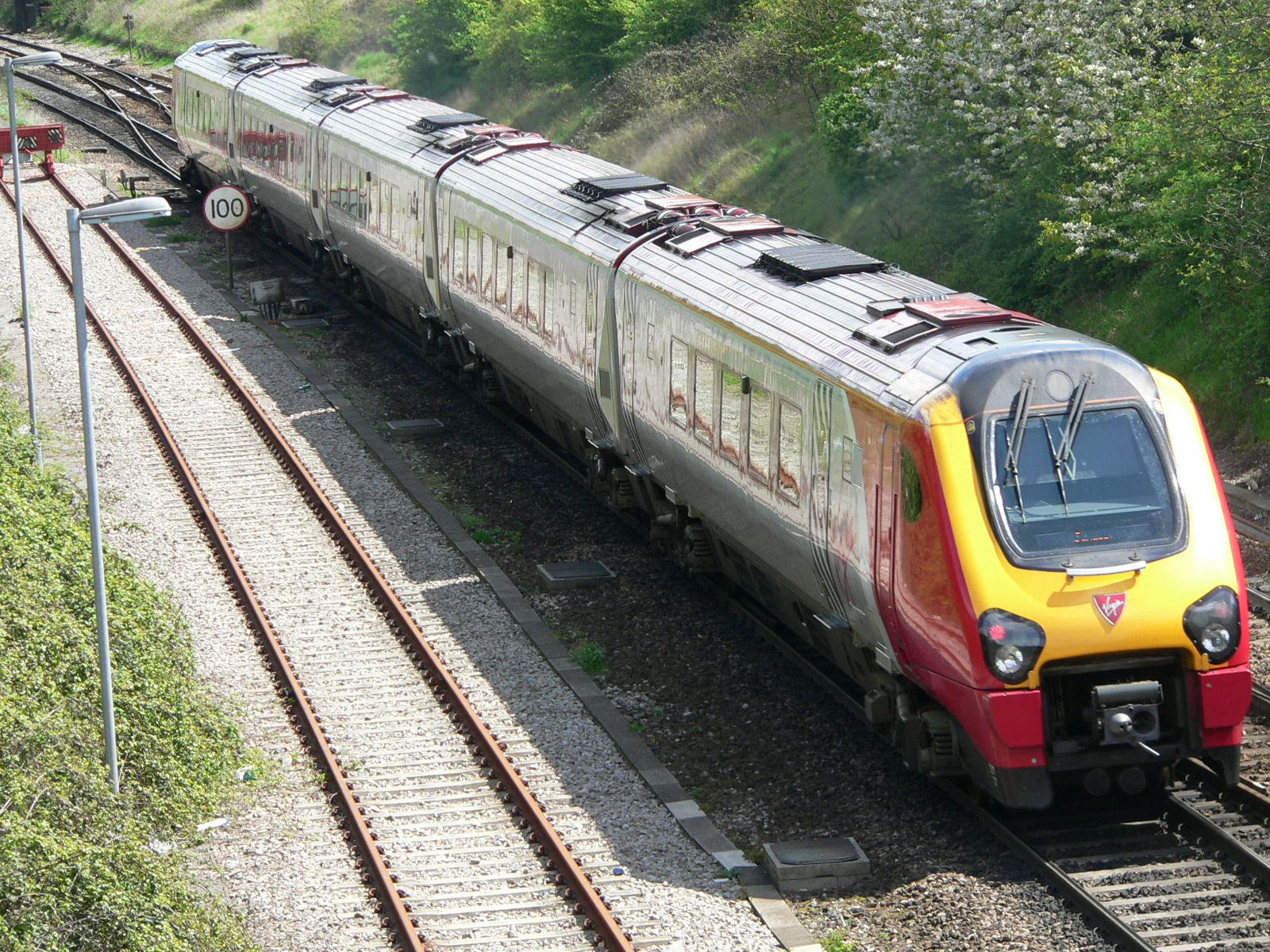
Virgin CrossCountry Class 221 in May 2006

In the mid-1990s the Virgin Rail Group was formed to bid for passenger franchises as part of the privatisation of British Rail. It successfully bid to operate the CrossCountry and InterCity West Coast franchises, with Virgin CrossCountry and Virgin West Coast commencing in March 1997. Initially the two franchises traded as Virgin CrossCountry and Virgin West Coast, before both were replaced by the Virgin Trains name. It also bid unsuccessfully for the Thameslink, Thames Trains and West Anglia Great Northern franchises.

Virgin Group initially held a 41% shareholding in the Virgin Rail Group with Bankers Trust, Electra Fleming, JPMorgan Chase and Texas Pacific Group holding the remaining 59%. In June 1998, a 49% stake was sold to Stagecoach Group with Virgin Group increasing its shareholding to 51%. Stagecoach already operated the Island Line Trains and South West Trains franchises in its own right.

Upon being re-tendered, in November 2007 the CrossCountry franchise was taken over by Arriva CrossCountry. In December 2019, the West Coast franchise was taken over by Avanti West Coast after being re-tendered.

== Virgin Trains East Coast ==
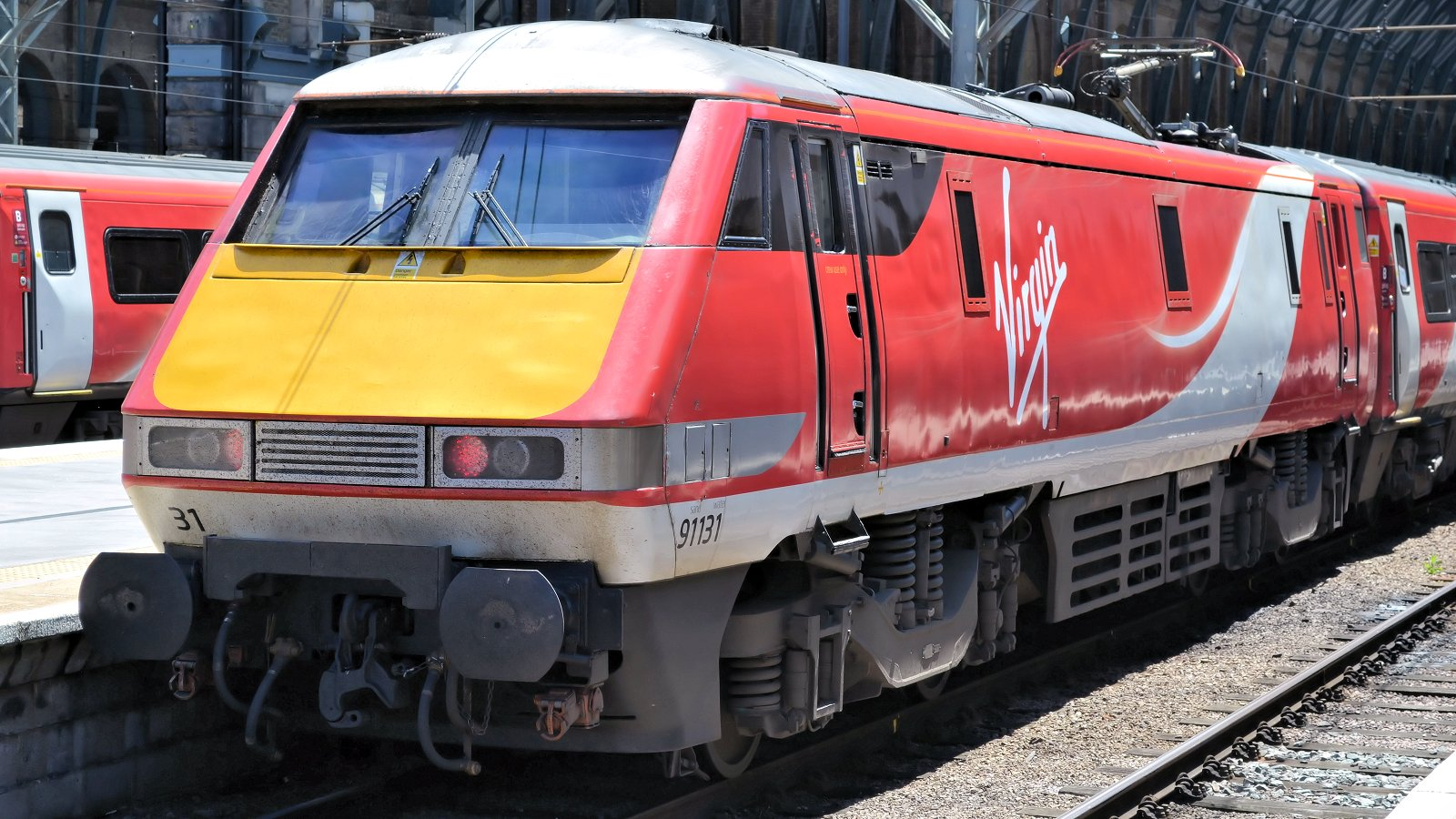
Virgin Trains East Coast InterCity 225 in June 2017

In March 2015, Virgin Trains East Coast took over operation of the InterCity East Coast franchise from East Coast. Stagecoach Group held 90% of the shares with Virgin Group the remaining 10%. Having overbid, in June 2018 the franchise was handed back to the Department for Transport with London North Eastern Railway taking over.

== Virgin Trains USA ==
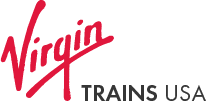
Virgin Trains USA logo

In November 2018, it was announced that Virgin Group had concluded a deal with Brightline to rebrand as Virgin Trains USA. However, in August 2020 Brightline sought to terminate the deal, claiming that the Virgin Trains brand was no longer of value after the loss of its InterCity West Coast franchise. Virgin sued Brightline for breach of contract. In October 2023 Virgin won in the High Court of Justice in London and was awarded $115 million in damages.
