= Virgin Trains =

British train operating company (1997–2019)

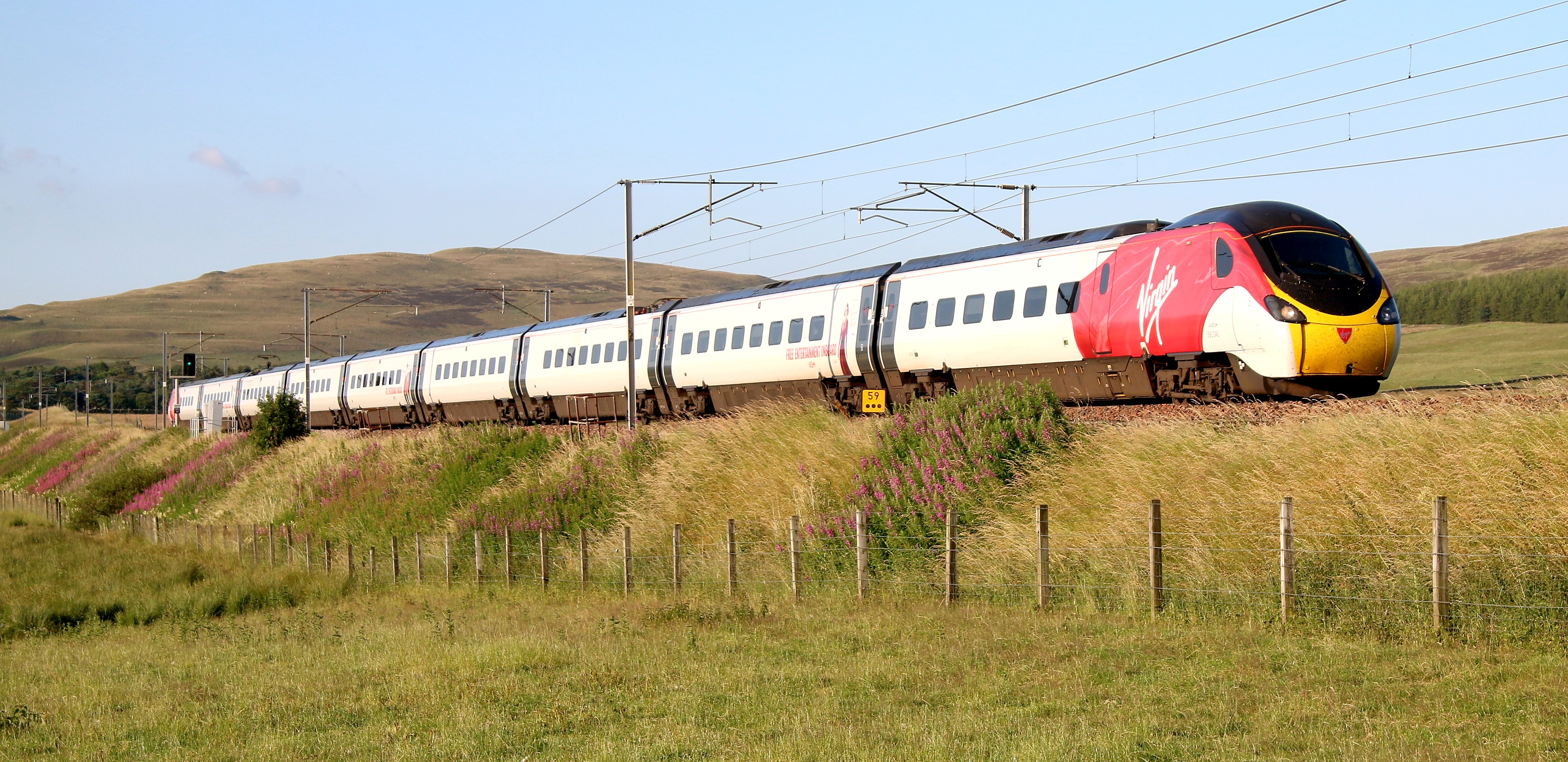
- Virgin Pendolino set 390045 heads from Glasgow to London through the Upper Clyde Valley

Overview
- Franchises: InterCity West Coast; 9 March 1997 – 7 December 2019
- Main routes: London–Glasgow/Edinburgh; London–Liverpool; London–Manchester; London–West Midlands; London–Chester
- Other routes: London–Blackpool; London–Holyhead; London–Shrewsbury; London–Wrexham
- Fleet: 56 Class 390 Pendolinos, 20 Class 221 Super Voyagers
- Stations called at: 46
- Stations operated: 17
- Parent company: Virgin Rail Group (owned by Virgin Group 51% and Stagecoach 49%)
- Reporting mark: VT
- Predecessor: InterCity
- Successor: Avanti West Coast

Virgin Trains (VT) (legal name West Coast Trains Limited) was a British train operating company owned by Virgin Rail Group, a joint venture between Virgin Group and Stagecoach, which operated the InterCity West Coast franchise from 9 March 1997 to 7 December 2019. The franchise covered long-distance passenger services on the West Coast Main Line between London, the West Midlands, North West England, North Wales and southern Scotland. Consequently, it connected six of the UK's largest cities: London, Birmingham, Manchester, Liverpool, Glasgow and Edinburgh, which have a combined metropolitan population of over 18 million. It had around 3,400 employees in 2015.

The Virgin Trains brand was also used on the legally and operationally separate Virgin Trains East Coast (2015-18), on Virgin CrossCountry (1997-2007) and Virgin Trains USA in Florida (2018-20).

The contract expired on 7 December 2019, having been originally scheduled for expiry in March 2020. Virgin did not contest losing the franchise after its joint venture partner, Stagecoach, was disqualified due to an invalid bid in April 2019.

== History ==
Diagram of the ownership of TOCs between Virgin and Stagecoach

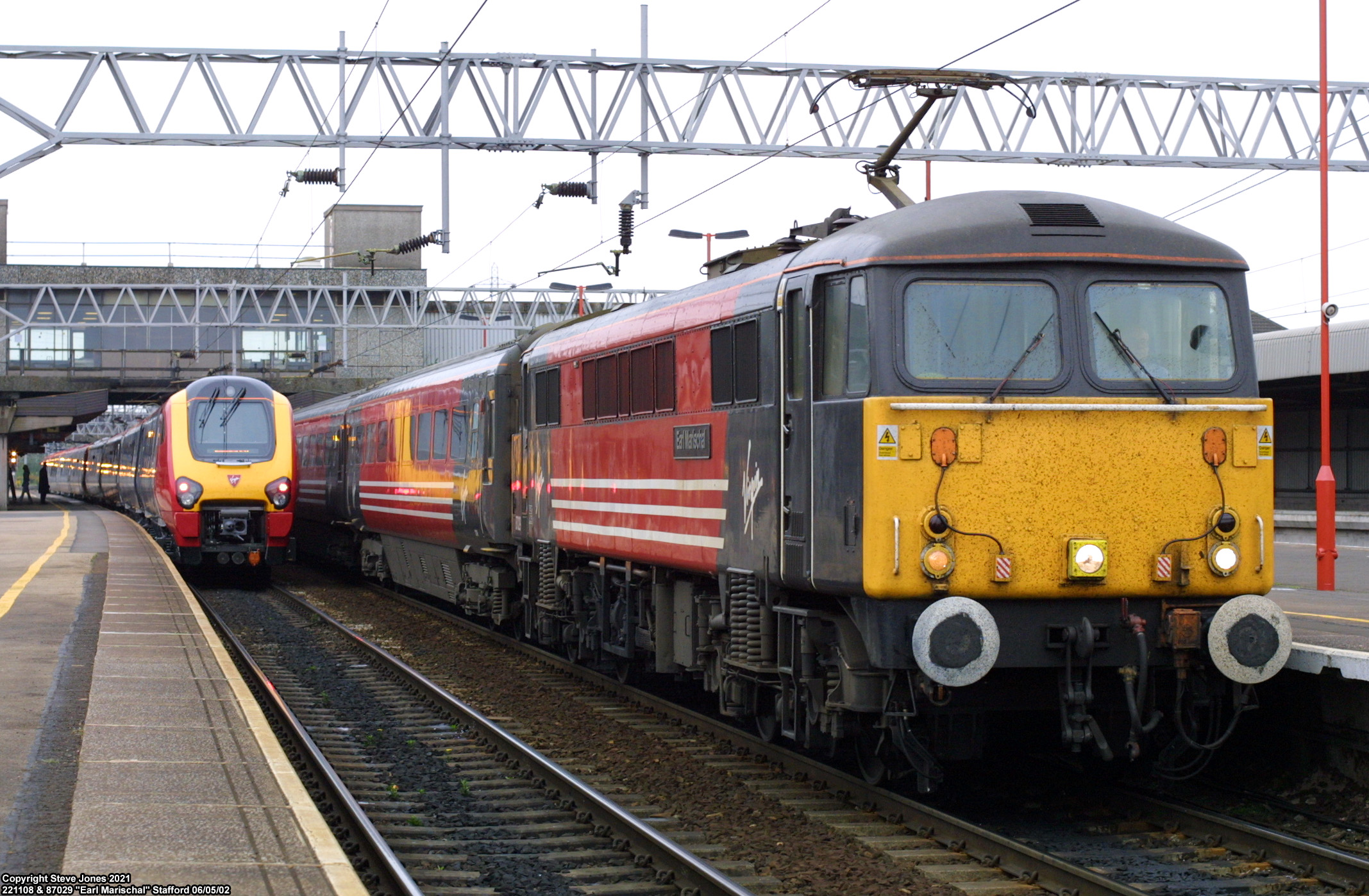
A Class 87 locomotive at Stafford, with a Class 221 Super Voyager on the other track (2002)

Amid the privatisation of British Rail during the mid-1990s, the newly-formed Virgin Rail Group submitted multiple bids to operate several different railway franchises, including Gatwick Express, InterCity CrossCountry and InterCity West Coast. It was successful in winning the latter two, leading to Virgin CrossCountry and Virgin West Coast (commonly referred to as Virgin Trains) commencing operations in January and March 1997 respectively.

One of Virgin's franchise commitments was to replace the British Rail-era locomotives and rolling stock inherited by Virgin West Coast with brand new tilting trains. It was expected that the Pendolinos would run at service speeds of up to 140 mph (225 km/h) and that the whole fleet would be delivered by May 2002.

In order for tilting trains to be operated, Railtrack had committed itself to upgrading the West Coast Main Line as to permit 140 mph operation by 2005. The line's modernisation was slowed by spiralling costs, rising from an estimated £2 billion to roughly £10 billion, while the programme had failures that were technical as well as managerial, such as the moving block signalling apparatus being immature for such a busy mixed-traffic main line. Railtrack would ultimately collapse while its successor, Network Rail, would also be unable to fully deliver the promised upgrade, heavily impacting Virgin West Coast's operations. The upgrade programme would be cut back; as a result, the top speed was reduced to 125 miles per hour (201 km/h).

Virgin Trains' franchise was originally due to expire in March 2012. In mid-2009, Virgin founder Richard Branson launched a campaign to have the next franchise period extended for 20 to 30 years, so that Virgin could spend more on infrastructure and see a return on its investment. Branson said the journey time between London and Birmingham could be reduced by 22 minutes to under one hour. This approach was turned down by the Department for Transport. Virgin proceeded to apply for a two-year extension, but this was also ruled out by the Department of Transport on legal grounds.

In January 2011, the Department for Transport called for expressions of interest in bidding for the next InterCity West Coast franchise. In March 2011, the Department announced that Abellio, FirstGroup, Keolis/SNCF and Virgin Rail Group had been shortlisted to bid for the franchise. In May 2011, the Secretary of State for Transport announced that the end date had been postponed to allow the recommendations in the McNulty Report to be absorbed. In October 2011, the Department announced that Virgin had been granted a franchise extension until December 2012.

An invitation to tender was issued to the shortlisted bidders in January 2012, and the Department for Transport awarded FirstGroup the new franchise in August 2012. Virgin spoke out against this decision, claiming that the methodology used to award the franchise was flawed, while Branson stated that it was unlikely Virgin would bid for any future franchises. When the DfT did not directly respond to Virgin's concerns, the operator launched proceedings for a judicial review.

During October 2012, the Secretary of State announced that the government was cancelling the franchise competition for the InterCity West Coast franchise, after discovering significant technical flaws in the way the process was conducted, reversing the decision to award it to FirstGroup. Following an independent review of the franchising process, a fresh competition would be held. The government announced that it would negotiate with Virgin Trains to run the InterCity West Coast franchise for a further nine to 13 months. In December 2012, Virgin was awarded a 23-month management contract to run the franchise until 9 November 2014.

In March 2013, the Secretary of State announced that the franchise would again be extended until 31 March 2017. During May 2013, there was a controversy regarding new uniforms, with claims that the blouses were too revealing and potentially exposed dark bras to the public. Virgin Rail Group responded to this by offering a voucher worth £20 to allow employees to purchase a top to wear underneath the new blouses.

In July 2013, the Office of Rail Regulation rejected an application by Virgin Trains to operate new services to Shrewsbury and Blackpool North, citing capacity constraints on the West Coast Main Line. In November 2013, a revised application for services to Shrewsbury and Blackpool North was approved; the services started in December 2014.

During November 2016, the franchise was further extended until March 2019. In February 2018, the contract was yet again extended until March 2019, with an option to extend it further to March 2020. In March 2018, it was announced that the contract would end in September 2019 when the new West Coast Partnership franchise would commence.

In December 2018, it was announced that Virgin Trains had been granted a one-year extension until March 2020. In April 2019, Stagecoach revealed that it had been disqualified from the franchises it was bidding for, including the West Coast Partnership. One month later, the company announced that it would mount a legal challenge to its disqualification. On 17 June 2020, the High Court ruled against the company and that the decision had been lawful.

In August 2019, it was announced that the Inter-City West Coast franchise had been awarded to Avanti West Coast, thus confirming that Virgin Trains would cease to operate trains after 7 December 2019. The final Virgin Trains service was the 21:42 service from London Euston to Wolverhampton arriving at 23:45.

In October 2026, Virgin showed a mock-up of its train for its planned services in 2030 through the Channel Tunnel via High Speed 1 to the continent, competing with Eurostar. Virgin has ordered twelve 185 mph (300 km/h) Avelia Stream trains from Alstom intended to improve on Eurostar's design and customer experience. It is hoping to offer connections to Virgin Atlantic flights from London.

== Services ==
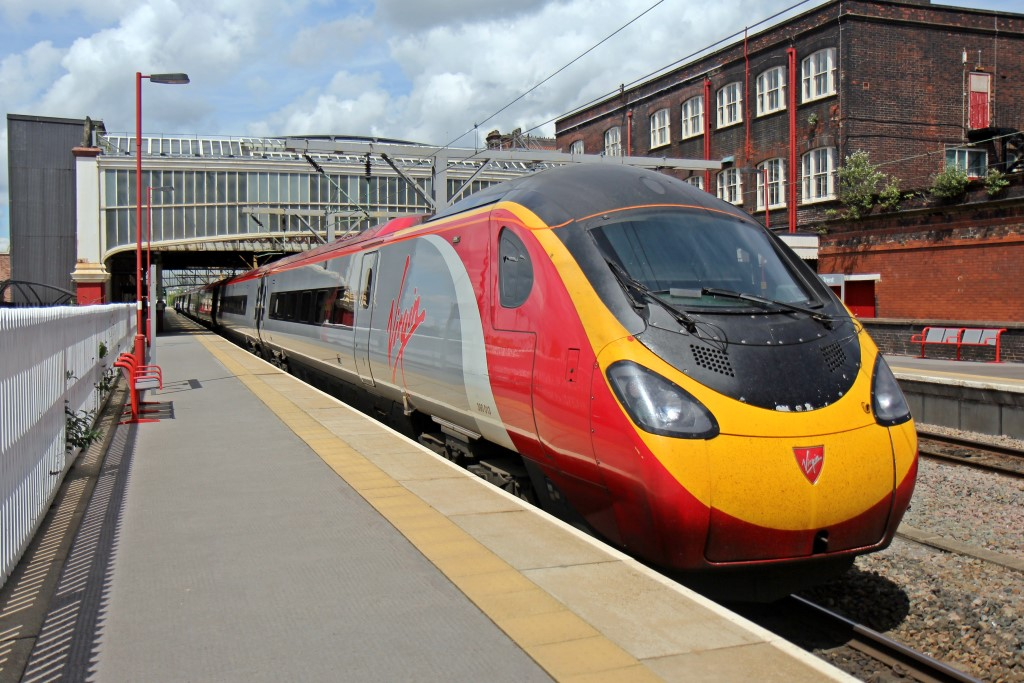
A Class 390 Pendolino at Stoke-on-Trent

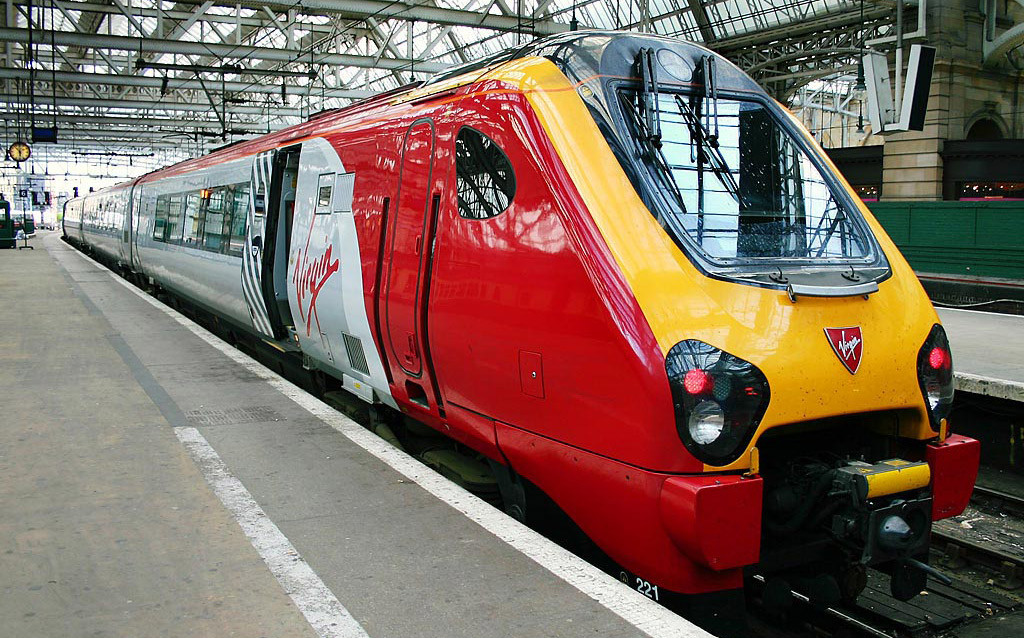
A Class 221 Super Voyager at Glasgow Central

In May 1998, Virgin introduced two new services from London Euston to Shrewsbury and to Blackpool North. The former ceased in 1999, the latter in May 2003. In December 2014, a daily weekday service between London Euston and Blackpool North and a twice daily service between London Euston and Shrewsbury were reintroduced. This was increased to four trains per day in the May 2018 timetable.

On 23 July 2002, the first elements of the new fleet of Pendolino tilting trains were introduced into passenger services from Birmingham International to Manchester Piccadilly, intentionally coinciding with the opening of the 2002 Commonwealth Games in Manchester.

In September 2004, a London Euston to Llandudno service was introduced, but it ceased in December 2008.

In September 2005, Virgin introduced its first 125-mile-per-hour (201 km/h) timetable following the completion of Stage 1 of the upgrade.

In December 2007, as part of a reshuffle of rail franchises by the Department for Transport, services from Birmingham New Street to Edinburgh Waverley and Glasgow Central via Crewe were transferred from the CrossCountry franchise to the InterCity West Coast franchise.

In December 2008, a London Euston to Wrexham General service was introduced, operating southbound in the morning with an evening return.

In February 2009, an hourly London Euston to Chester service was introduced.

From January 2009, Virgin Trains gradually rolled out a new "very high frequency" timetable to take advantage of the completed West Coast Main Line upgrade.

There were timetable changes from 8 December 2013. Trains between Edinburgh/Glasgow and London would call at Sandwell & Dudley, replacing the hourly Wolverhampton to Euston service. Most Liverpool services additionally called at Crewe.

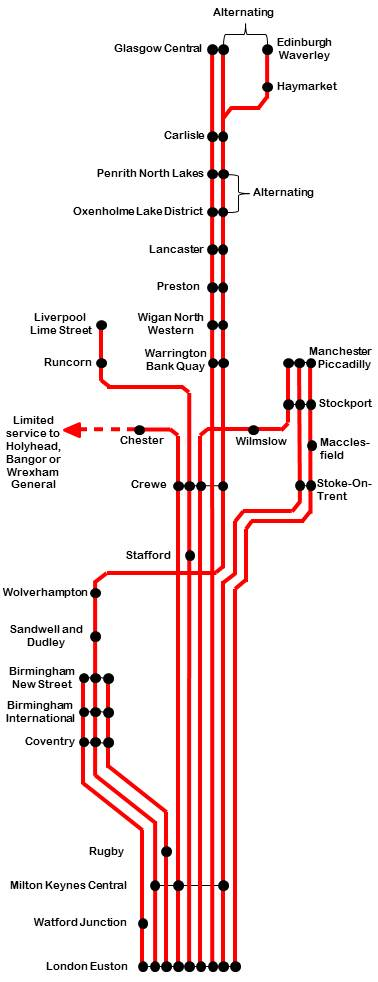
A vector map showing the off-peak service pattern each hour

== Performance ==
=== Passenger numbers ===
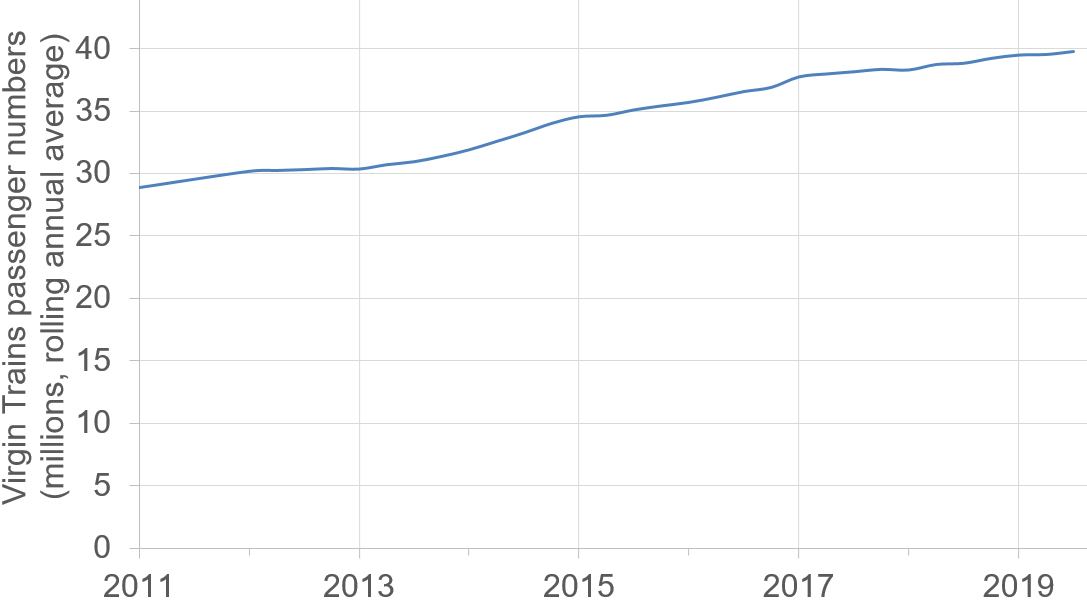
Virgin Trains West Coast passenger numbers in the previous year from 2011 to 2019.

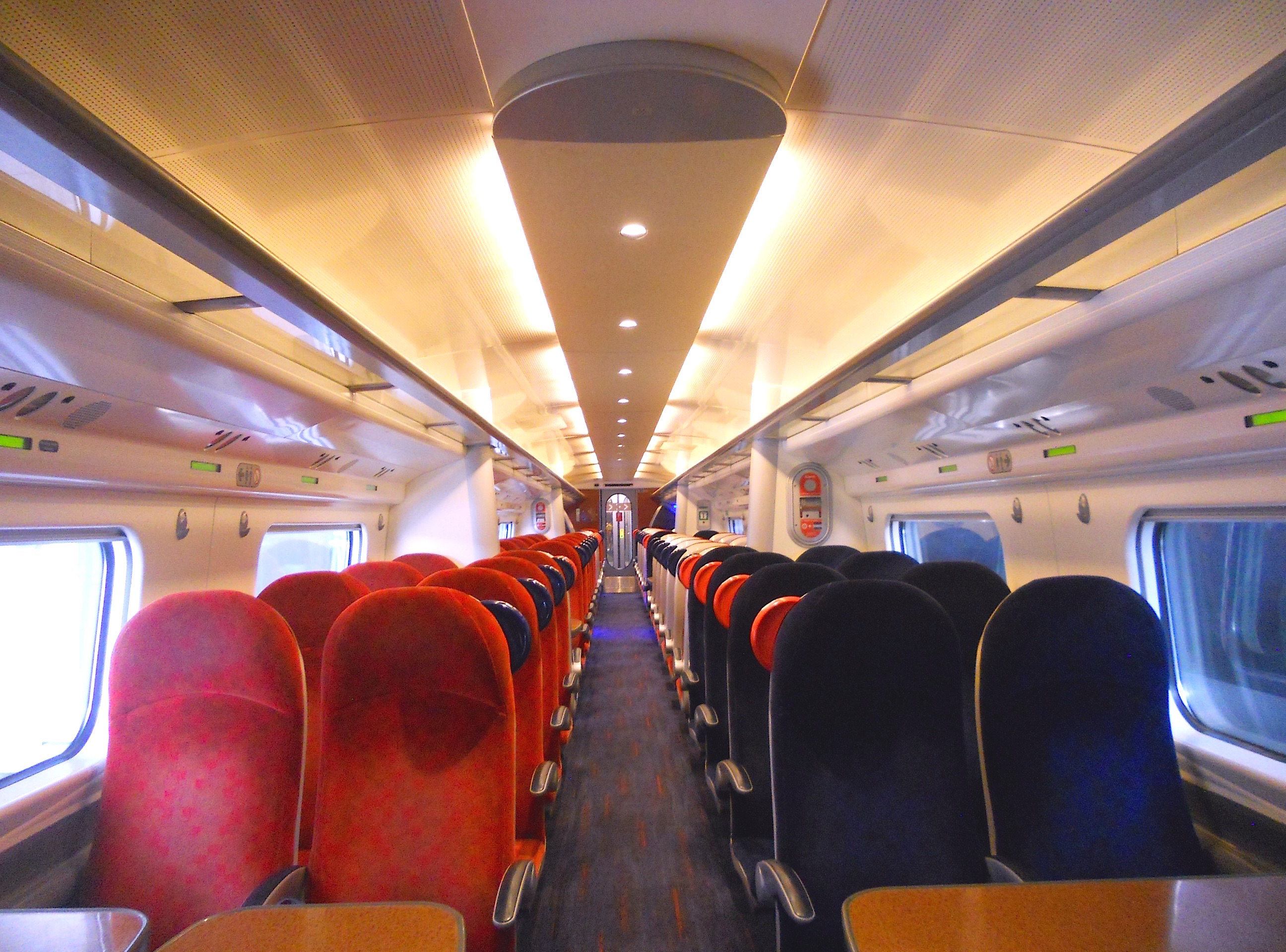
Standard Class on board a Class 390 Pendolino

Annual passenger numbers
Year	Passenger numbers		Passenger km	
Year	(millions)	% Change	(millions)	% Change
2010–11	28.9		5,698.8	
2011–12	30.2	▲4.5	5,923.0	▲3.9
2012–13	30.4	▲0.7	5,958.4	▲0.6
2013–14	31.9	▲4.9	6,215.4	▲4.3
2014-15	34.5	▲8.2	6,887.9	▲10.8
2015-16	35.7	▲3.5	7,059.8	▲2.5

=== Punctuality ===
Virgin Trains suffered poor punctuality compared with some other transport operators between 2001 and 2006, according to Office of Rail Regulation statistics. Punctuality did gradually improve until the introduction of a new timetable in December 2008, following the upgrade of the West Coast Main Line, which resulted in a dip in performance. Performance subsequently recovered and peaked during 2010–11, but then fell again and reached a new low for the year ending 31 March 2013 of 83.6% (MAA).

The PPM MAA (Public performance measure Moving Annual Average - % of trains arriving within ten minutes of the scheduled times) figures for Virgin Trains are as follows:

Financial year to 31 March	% within 10 mins
2002	68.7%
2003	73.5%
2004	74.8%
2005	72.1%
2006	83.5%
2007	86.0%
2008	86.2%
2009	80.0%
2010	84.6%
2011	86.6%
2012	85.9%
2013	83.6%
2014	85.8%
2015	84.7%

Latest figures published by Network Rail for the seventh period of 2013-2014 recorded PPM of 92.2% for the period and a MAA of 83.5% for the 12 months up to 12 October 2013. The PPM performance for the period is down 2.7 percentage points on the corresponding figure from the same period last year. Network Rail noted that Virgin Trains were only responsible for 16% of delays in period five. Network Rail was itself directly responsible for 50% of Virgin Trains' delays, 20% were a result of external factors (e.g. fatalities) and the final 14% were due to other operators.

Chris Green, as chief executive, led a drive to improve reliability and punctuality after much press criticism in 2001. By 2006, due to improved reliability of trains and completion of major infrastructure projects, performance was better. Virgin has undertaken a number of projects to increase punctuality, including radio-controlled watches.

== Grayrigg derailment ==
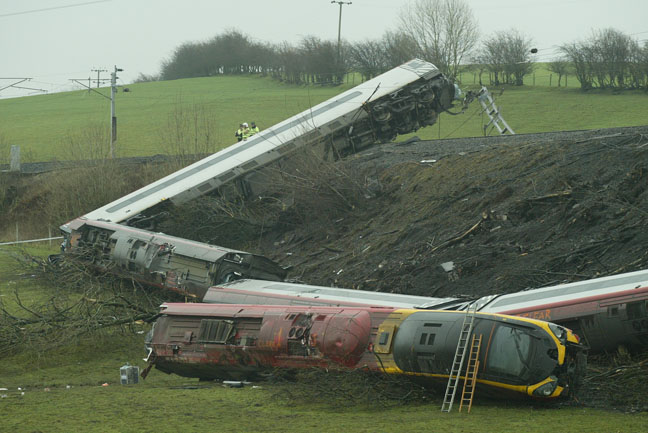
The scene of the Grayrigg derailment

On 23 February 2007, a Class 390 Pendolino "City of Glasgow" forming the 17:15 London Euston to Glasgow Central service derailed in the village of Grayrigg, in Cumbria. The train was carrying 109 people and several carriages were left lying on the railway embankments. An elderly woman was killed in the derailment and five people were seriously injured. The accident was caused by a faulty set of points and Network Rail accepted full responsibility. The train itself was widely praised for the way it retained its structural integrity. Branson also praised the driver for attempting to stop the train and not leaving the cab before it derailed.

== Rolling stock ==
=== Final fleet ===
Class	Image	Type	Top speed		Carriages	Number	Built
Class	Image	Type	mph	km/h	Carriages	Number	Built
Class 221 Super Voyager		DEMU	125	200	5	20	2001–02
Class 390/0 & 390/1 Pendolino		EMU	140	225	9	21	2001–2004; 2010–2012
Class 390/0 & 390/1 Pendolino		EMU	140	225	11	35	2001–2004; 2010–2012

Virgin inherited a fleet of Classes 86, 87 and 90s hauling Mark 2 and Mark 3 carriages with Driving Van Trailers on its electric services; High Speed Trains were used for its diesel-operated London Euston to Holyhead services.

A franchise commitment was the replacement of these trains with new tilting stock. In 1999, Virgin signed a deal to lease 44 eight-carriage and nine nine-carriage Pendolinos, built by Alstom. An option to extend all to nine carriages was enacted in 2002; the first entered service in January 2003. With the exception of services to Holyhead, the final locomotive-hauled trains were withdrawn in June 2005.

To operate the Holyhead services, four Class 221 Super Voyagers of four carriages were included in with the order placed by Virgin CrossCountry. By the time they were delivered, it was decided these would be too short, so they entered service with the CrossCountry franchise instead. In September 2004, the High Speed Trains were withdrawn, with services being operated by a combination of five-carriage Super Voyagers hired from Virgin CrossCountry, with Classes 47 and 90-hauled Mark 3 sets. From September 2005, Class 57/3s hauling Pendolinos took over the locomotive-hauled diagrams. This continued until December 2008, when five-carriage Class 221 Super Voyagers assumed all services, with the exception of a Saturdays-only Pendolino hauled by a Class 57/3 locomotive; (Note: Route details: 1D83 08:50 EUS-HHD; 1A55 14:38 HHD-EUS.) this ceased operation on 8 December 2012.

With the Class 390 Pendolinos needing modification in 2006, a First GBRf Class 87 was hired to haul a Mark 3 set on Birmingham New Street services.

To operate the Birmingham New Street to Edinburgh Waverley and Glasgow Central services transferred from CrossCountry in December 2007, three four-carriage and 13 five-carriage Super Voyagers were transferred. A further five Super Voyagers of five-carriages followed in December 2008.

In August 2008, Bombardier started a programme to rearrange the Class 221 Super Voyagers with the carriage containing the shop moved to adjoin the first class carriage and refurbished with 2+2 seats arranged more spaciously around tables. This allowed it to be used as a first class carriage on Holyhead services and as a standard class carriage at other times.

In December 2010, a four-carriage Class 221 Super Voyager was disbanded, with the two centre carriages being inserted into the other four-carriage sets to give Virgin a fleet of 20 five-carriage Super Voyagers. The two end carriages are stored at Central Rivers depot.

To provide it with a fleet of locomotives for use on diversionary services during the West Coast Main Line upgrade and rescue duties, Virgin signed a deal with Porterbrook in March 2002 to rebuild twelve Class 47s as Class 57/3s, with the first delivered in June 2002. After it was decided they would operate daily services along the North Wales Coast to Holyhead, another four were ordered from Porterbrook. Following the completion of the West Coast Main Line upgrade in 2008, their use fell; after being sublet to Arriva Trains Wales, Colas Rail and First GBRf, six were returned to Porterbrook in August 2011, three in April 2012 and the remaining seven in December 2012.

Virgin had long been angling for a franchise extension in return for ordering extra carriages for the Class 390 Pendolinos. The Department for Transport rejected this and instead placed an order itself with Alstom for 106 carriages allowing for four complete eleven-carriage sets and 31 sets to be extended by two carriages. There was an option to extend the remaining 21 sets but this was allowed to lapse. The four new sets were delivered in 2010/12 with 31 sets later receiving extra carriages. This required a number of stations to have platforms lengthened.

Following the loss of a Class 390 Pendolino in the Grayrigg derailment, a Mark 3 set with a Driving Van Trailer was leased with a Class 90 hired from English Welsh & Scottish as required. In 2008, Virgin looked at leasing two Class 180s but decided to retain the Mark 3 set. This received re-upholstered seating, power points, wi-fi and a full external repaint at Wabtec, Doncaster, in 2009. Virgin used this set with a Class 90 locomotive hired from Freightliner on a Euston to Crewe, via Birmingham, service on Fridays only until December 2012. From 9 December 2013, it was utilised to operate a London Euston-Birmingham New Street train on Thursdays and Fridays only, until its withdrawal in October 2014.

All seats on Class 221 Super Voyagers and Class 390 Pendolinos originally had an on-board audio entertainment system featuring a number of radio or pre-recorded music channels. This was disabled in March 2010 and replaced with on-board wi-fi provided by EE. The service was available free in first class and for a charge (Note: This charge varied depending on how long the passenger wished to use it for.) in standard class.

On 15 September 2015, it was announced that Virgin Trains were to rename Pendolino 390002 in memory of teenage fundraiser Stephen Sutton.

=== Past fleet ===
Former locomotives and rolling stock operated by Virgin Trains include:

Class	Image	Type	Top speed		Built	Withdrawn
Class	Image	Type	mph	km/h	Built	Withdrawn
Class 43		Diesel-electric locomotive	125	200	1975–82	2003
Class 47/8		Diesel-electric locomotive	95	153	1962–68 (Note: Converted into Class 47/8 in 1989.)	2002
Class 57/3		Diesel-electric locomotive	95	153	1998–2004	2012
Class 86		Electric locomotive	100	161	1965–66	2003
Class 87		Electric locomotive	110	177	1973–75	2006
Class 90		Electric locomotive	110	177	1987–90	2004
Mark 2 Coach		Passenger carriage	100	160	1964–75	2003
Mark 3 Coach		Passenger carriage	125	200	1975–88	2014
Mark 3 DVT		Driving Van Trailer	125	200	1988–90	2014

== Depots ==
The Class 390 fleet was allocated to the Alstom Traincare Centre at Longsight, with lighter maintenance and overnight servicing carried out at Wembley, Oxley, Edge Hill and Polmadie depots. The Class 221 fleet was allocated to Bombardier's Central Rivers depot, with lighter maintenance and overnight servicing carried out by Arriva TrainCare at Crewe, Holyhead and Polmadie.

== West Coast Partnership ==
In November 2016, the government announced that the franchise would be replaced by a new franchise named the West Coast Partnership, which will include operating High Speed 2 (HS2). Services are planned to begin on the first phase of HS2 in 2026. The Department for Transport requires that the new operator have experience in operating high-speed trains (155 mph (249 km/h)) and infrastructure. The bid for the new franchise was led by Stagecoach holding a 50% holding, Virgin with 30% and the French national railway operator SNCF holding 20%. In April 2019, Stagecoach revealed that it had been disqualified from the franchises it was bidding for following a dispute with the DfT over pension liabilities. The disqualification occurred after the bidding deadline and as a result Virgin Trains would cease operations in March 2020.

In August 2019, the First Trenitalia consortium was awarded the West Coast Partnership contract, with Avanti West Coast commencing in December 2019, thus ending Virgin Trains services after 22 years.

== Operation ==
=== Sponsorship ===
Virgin Trains were Carlisle United F.C.'s travel sponsor for the 2013/14 season and, for the 2014/15 season, it was the club's main shirt sponsor agreeing a further two-year deal. On 5 August 2014, Virgin Trains also agreed to be the shirt sponsor of Preston North End F.C. on a two-year deal. Darlington F.C. was also sponsored by Virgin Trains and the company has also sponsored events such as Manchester International Festival in 2013.

=== Onboard entertainment ===
In July 2016, the integrated infotainment system BEAM was provided on all trains by GoMedia, delivered directly to the passenger's own devices including mobile phones and tablets. The system was described as "the first in-train entertainment portal in the UK." It offered premium movies from media organisations, such as BBC Worldwide and Hollywood studios.

=== Moderation of competition ===
As a way of protecting the revenues of Virgin Trains to enable it to pay franchise premiums to the government, (Note: This was to partly recoup the cost of the West Coast Main Line upgrade.) the Office of Rail Regulation (ORR) inserted a Moderation of Competition in Virgin's Track Access Agreement. Until its expiry in March 2012, this prevented any other train operating or open-access companies operating services in competition that would abstract revenue.

== Open-access operator opportunities ==
In November 2019, Virgin Trains submitted an open access operator application to the ORR for paths to run trains from London Euston to Liverpool Lime Street with Class 221s (Note: Once they were released by Avanti West Coast.) with services to begin in December 2022. In March 2020, Virgin withdrew its application for the service, citing uncertainty from the Williams Review not having been published yet.

In May 2024, Virgin Trains submitted an application to the ORR applying for paths from London Euston to Birmingham New Street, Manchester Victoria, Rochdale, Liverpool Lime Street and Glasgow Central.

In October 2024, as Virgin Trains Europe, it applied to the ORR for access to Temple Mills Depot, intending to operate services from London St Pancras, via High Speed 1 and Channel Tunnel to Paris, Brussels and Amsterdam. In August 2026, the ORR granted track access rights to run up to 20 return services daily. Eurostar Group, the current monopoly operator, has appealed the ORR's decision.

== See also ==
- List of companies operating trains in the United Kingdom
- National Rail
- Rail franchising in Great Britain
- Rail transport in Great Britain.

== Notes ==
Preceded by InterCity (as part of British Rail)	Operator of InterCity West Coast franchise 1997–2019	Succeeded by Avanti West Coast; West Coast Partnership franchise
