= Virgin CrossCountry =

Former British train operating company

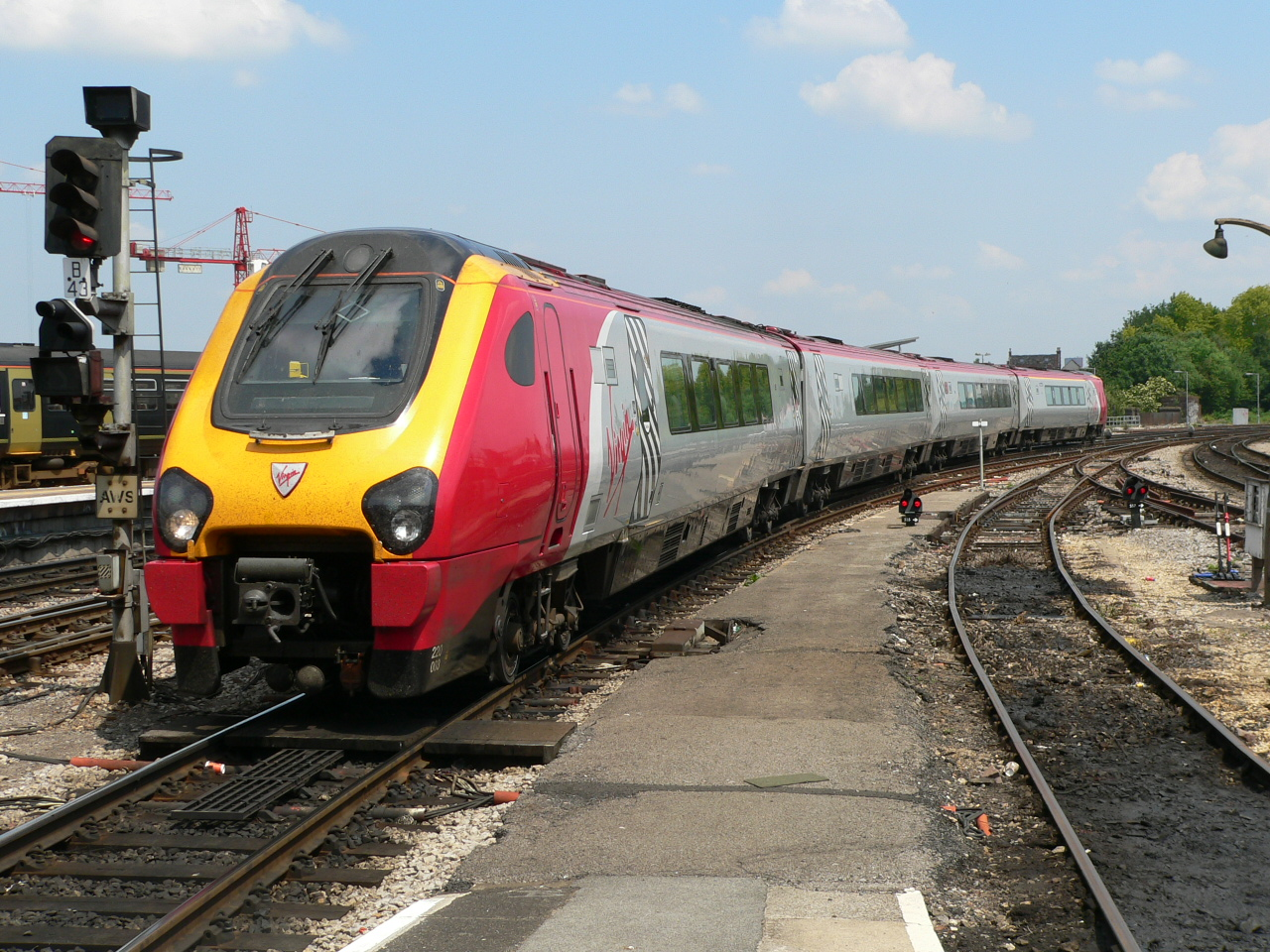
- A Class 220 Voyager at Bristol Temple Meads in 2005

Overview
- Franchises: InterCity CrossCountry; 6 January 1997 – 10 November 2007
- Main routes: Southern England/London Paddington and South West England/South East Wales – Midlands – Northern England and Scotland
- Fleet: 34 Voyager and 44 Super Voyager sets
- Parent company: Virgin Rail Group: Virgin Group (51%); Stagecoach (49%)
- Reporting mark: VXC
- Successor: CrossCountry

Virgin CrossCountry was a British train operating company that operated the InterCity CrossCountry passenger franchise from January 1997 until November 2007. Along with the InterCity West Coast franchise held by a separate legal entity, the company traded under the Virgin Trains brand.

Operations commenced on 5 January 1997 as part of the privatisation of British Rail. Originally scheduled to run for 15 years, the franchise was suspended in favour of a management contract in July 2002. The government opted to retender the CrossCountry franchise during the late 2000s and services were transferred over to Arriva-owned CrossCountry on 11 November 2007.

Virgin CrossCountry operated some of the longest direct rail services in the United Kingdom, but most avoided Greater London entirely as a result of changes in 2003. All of its services called, or terminated, at Birmingham New Street. Multiple service reorganisations, such as Project Princess and Project Omega, were implemented by the company. In order to replace its British Rail-era rolling stock, the company introduced Class 220 Voyagers and Class 221 Super Voyagers.

== History ==
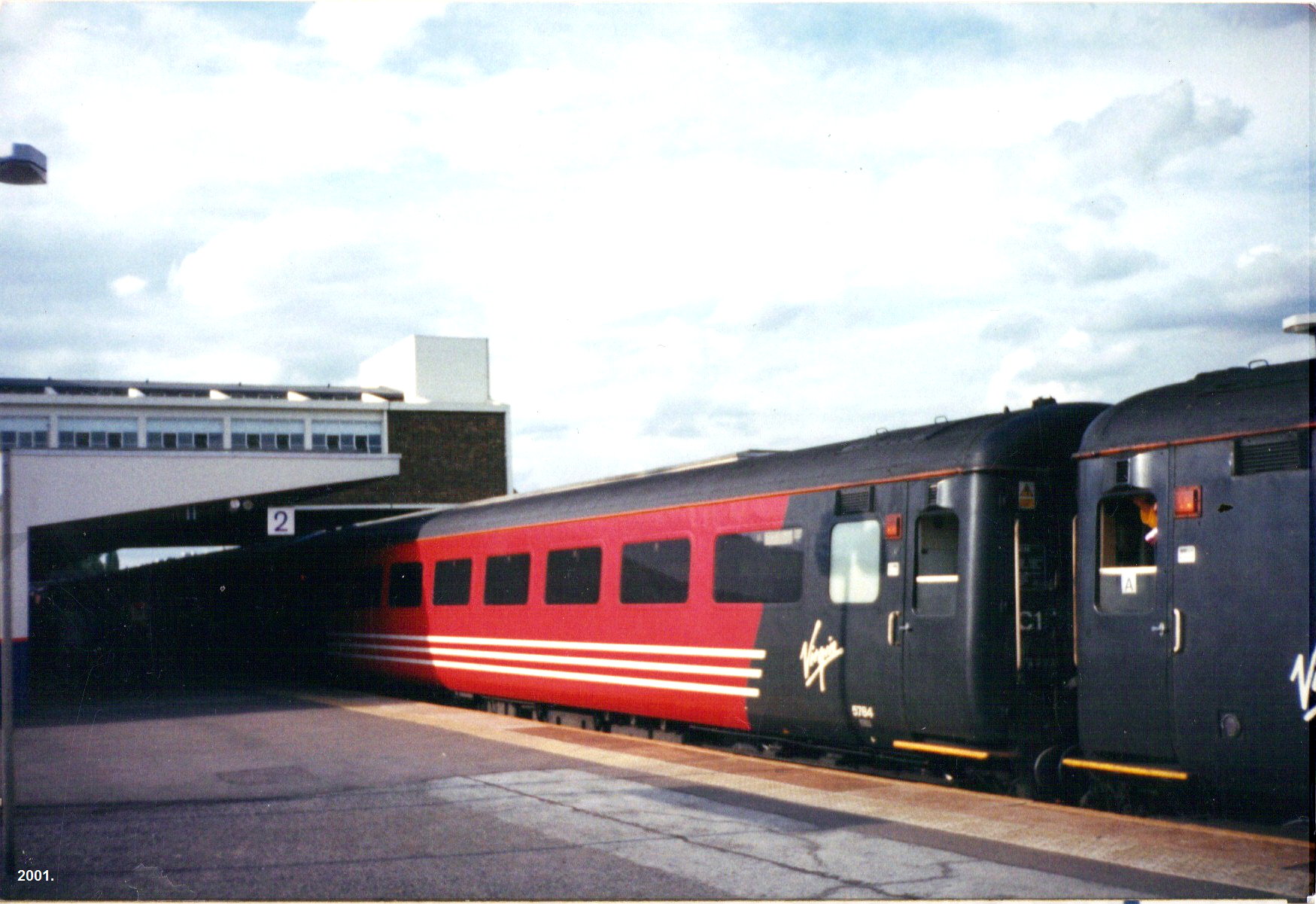
Mark 2 carriage at Banbury in 2001

Amid the privatisation of British Rail during the mid 1990s, the newly formed Virgin Rail Group submitted multiple bids to operate several different train franchises, including Gatwick Express, InterCity CrossCountry and InterCity West Coast. It was successful in winning the latter two, both scheduled to run for 15 years, leading to the creation of Virgin CrossCountry and Virgin West Coast: During November 1996, it was announced that Virgin had been awarded the InterCity CrossCountry franchise. Services were operated by a wholly owned subsidiary, CrossCountry Trains Limited. The company commenced operations on 5 January 1997.

In October 1998, Virgin Group sold 49% of the shares in Virgin Rail Group to Stagecoach.

Virgin sought to introduce new tilting trains upon some of its services; however, their introduction was repeatedly delayed as a consequence of poor project management by the national railway infrastructure owner of the era, Railtrack. Infrastructure changes were required to make effective use of tilting trains and, while Railtrack had committed itself to performing such upgrades on the West Coast Main Line as to permit 140 mph operation by 2005, the modernisation programme soon suffered from spiralling costs, as well as technical failures such as the moving block signalling apparatus sought being immature for the intended use at that time. Railtrack would ultimately collapse in 2002 while its successor, Network Rail, would also be unable to fully deliver the promised upgrade, heavily impacting Virgin's operations.

In the wake of the collapse of Railtrack and the inability of Network Rail to fully deliver on promised improvements, both the Virgin CrossCountry and Virgin West Coast franchises were suspended in favour of management contracts in July 2002. While the terms of the West Coast franchise were renegotiated, an agreement could not be reached on CrossCountry, and it was thus retendered during the late 2000s. Virgin Trains were keen to retain the franchise, and submitted a bid in response along with several other interested parties.

During September 2006, the Department for Transport announced the shortlist for the New CrossCountry franchise, which included Virgin Rail Group. In October 2006, the DfT issued the invitation to tender (ITT) to the four shortlisted bidders: Arriva, FirstGroup, National Express and Virgin Rail Group. On 10 July 2007, the Department for Transport awarded the new CrossCountry franchise to Arriva; accordingly, the services operated by Virgin CrossCountry were transferred over to the newly created operator, named CrossCountry, on 11 November 2007.

== Services ==
In May 1998, Virgin introduced new services from Portsmouth Harbour to Liverpool Lime Street and Blackpool North. The Summer Saturday service to Ramsgate ran for the last time in September 1999. The Summer Saturday services to Weymouth ran for the last time in September 2002.

=== Operation Princess ===
In September 2002, Virgin Trains launched Operation Princess. This involved introducing a new clockface timetable with shorter trains running more frequently. However, the new fleet suffered from a number of technical faults which, coupled with infrastructure and capacity issues, led to many problems. Between September 2002 and January 2003, punctuality fell to 54.1%, it was therefore agreed with the Strategic Rail Authority that certain services would be cut to improve reliability and robustness on the core network.

When Operation Princess was launched in September 2002, Virgin CrossCountry served these destinations:

Code	Route	Fate
VT0	Birmingham New Street to Swindon via Cheltenham	Withdrawn summer 2003
VT1	Glasgow Central, Edinburgh Waverley & Blackpool North through Birmingham New Street to South West of England	Blackpool North withdrawn summer 2003
VT2	Aberdeen, Edinburgh Waverley & Newcastle through Manchester Piccadilly and Birmingham New Street to Poole	Services west of Bournemouth withdrawn summer 2003
VT3	Liverpool Lime Street and Manchester Piccadilly, Manchester Airport, through Birmingham New Street to London Paddington, Portsmouth and Brighton	Portsmouth and London Paddington withdrawn summer 2003, reduced frequency to Brighton, all Liverpool Lime Street withdrawn winter 2003
VT4	Aberdeen and Edinburgh Waverley through Birmingham New Street to Cardiff, Swansea, Paignton and Penzance	Services west of Cardiff withdrawn summer 2003

=== Project Omega ===
Project Omega was a project which would have seen a series of improvements following the West Coast modernisation. This included Virgin CrossCountry running services from London Kings Cross to Teesside via Nottingham and York and another service from Portsmouth Harbour to Nottingham via Feltham for Heathrow. These services would have been run by the Class 220. The project also involved extending Virgin's West Coast and CrossCountry franchises by 5 years (both originally planned to end in 2012, so would have been 2017) as well as adding a fifth car to 38 Voyagers.

By the time Virgin Trains lost the CrossCountry franchise to Arriva in 2007, the network consisted of only the following routes:

Code	Route
VT1	South West of England through Birmingham to the North West and Scotland
VT2	South Coast through Birmingham to the North of England and Scotland
VT3	South West of England and South East Wales through Birmingham to the North East of England and Scotland

== Rolling stock ==
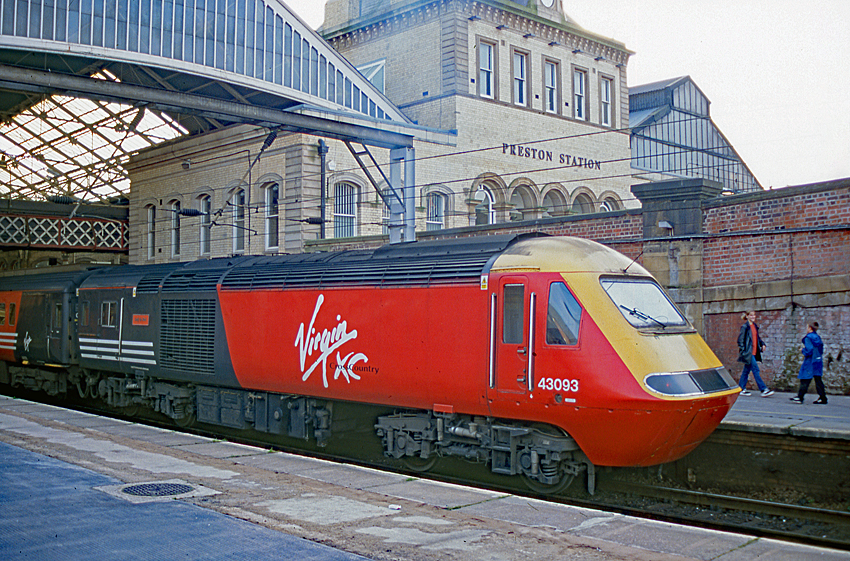
43093 Lady in Red in Virgin CrossCountry livery at Preston

Virgin CrossCountry inherited a fleet of Class 47 and Class 86 locomotives, Mark 2 Carriages, Mark 3 Carriages, High Speed Trains and Class 158 Express Sprinter diesel multiple units from British Rail. Class 47s on hire from English Welsh & Scottish and Fragonset were also fairly common.

A franchise commitment was the replacement of these trains with new stock. In December 1998 Virgin signed a deal to lease 78 Voyager diesel–electric multiple units built by Bombardier Transportation, consisting of 34 four-carriage Class 220 Voyagers and 40 five-carriage and four four-carriage Class 221 Super Voyagers. The Super Voyagers were built with tilting mechanisms to enable higher speeds on curved tracks, including on the West Coast Main Line and between Oxford and Banbury. The four-carriage Super Voyagers were intended for use by Virgin West Coast on services from London Euston to Holyhead, although they ended up being pooled with the other Voyagers. When Virgin West Coast started using Super Voyagers on Holyhead services in September 2004, the five-carriage units were used.

The first Class 220 Voyager arrived from Belgium in January 2001 and entered service on 21 May 2001. The last Class 47s, Class 86s and Mark 2 carriages were withdrawn in August 2002, while the Express Sprinters were transferred to Wessex Trains and First TransPennine Express.

After experiencing rapid growth Virgin CrossCountry decided to retain some High Speed Train sets. During December 2001, it announced plans to refurbish eight HSTs as Virgin Challengers for use on proposed services from London Paddington to Manchester Piccadilly via Cheltenham, with the option to refurbish more. In the wake of the collapse of Operation Princess, the project was cancelled with the remaining HSTs withdrawn in September 2003 on the instruction of the Strategic Rail Authority.

To provide extra stock for services on summer Saturday services to Paignton and Newquay, Virgin CrossCountry hired HSTs from Virgin West Coast, Midland Mainline and Great North Eastern Railway (GNER), and Mark 3B loco-hauled carriages from Virgin West Coast. In 2004, Virgin hired Class 67 locomotives from EWS and Mark 2 carriages from Riviera Trains to operate summer Saturday services to Paignton.

A standby set of Mark 2 carriages was leased from Riviera Trains from September 2004. This set was usually used with an EWS Class 90 locomotive between Birmingham New Street and Manchester Piccadilly, although it did run to Newcastle with a Class 57/3 in January 2007.

HSTs were hired from Midland Mainline and GNER on a number of occasions to operate services from Edinburgh Waverley to Plymouth when Voyagers were unavailable.

=== Original fleet ===
Class	Image	Type	Built	Withdrawn	Notes
Class 43		Diesel locomotive	1976–1982	2003	Operated with Mark 3 carriages.
Class 47		Diesel locomotive	1962–1968	2002	Operated with Mark 2 carriages. Some of these were rebuilt as Class 57/3 locomotives.
Class 86		Electric locomotive	1965–1966	2002	Operated with Mark 2 carriages.
Class 158 Express Sprinter		DMU	1989–1992	2003	
Mark 2 carriage		Passenger carriage	1964–1975	2002	Operated with Class 47 and 86 locomotives.
Mark 3 carriage		Passenger carriage	1975–1982	2003	Operated with Class 43 locomotives.

=== Final fleet ===
Class	Image	Type	Top speed		Built	Number
Class	Image	Type	mph	km/h	Built	Number
Class 220 Voyager		DEMU	125	200	2000–2001	34
Class 221 Super Voyager		DEMU	125	200	2001–2002	44

=== Planned fleet (never built) ===
Class	Image	Type	Built	Number	Information
Class 255 Virgin Challenger		DMU	2002 (planned refurbishment)	14 (planned)	Planned refurbishment of the High Speed Train to be used on services between Blackpool, Manchester and Birmingham, and Paddington to Birmingham via Swindon. These plans came to naught as the Strategic Rail Authority planned to transfer most of the stock to Midland Mainline for their London-Manchester 'Rio' services.

== See also ==
- Passenger rail franchising in Great Britain
- Cross Country Route

Preceded by InterCity; As part of British Rail	Operator of InterCity CrossCountry franchise 1997–2007	Succeeded by CrossCountry; New CrossCountry franchise
