= Crewe Depot =

Crewe Depot may refer to:

- Crewe Carriage Sidings
- Crewe Diesel TMD
- Crewe Electric TMD
- Crewe Gresty Lane TMD
