= Concourse House =

Tower block in Liverpool, England

Coordinates: 53.407°N 2.979°W

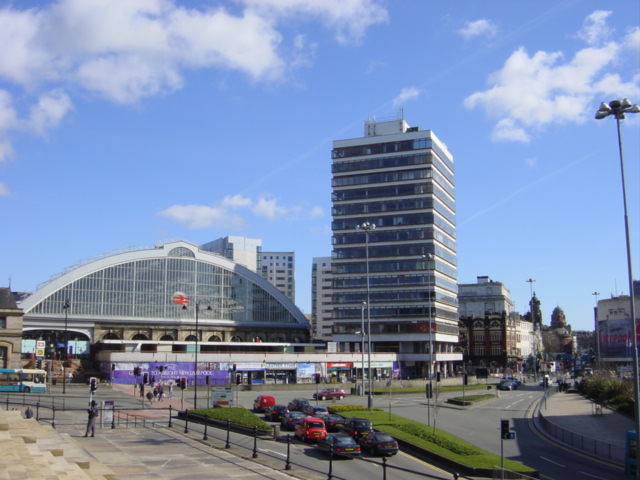
Seen in 2006, Concourse House to the right of Lime Street Station

Concourse House was a 1960s high-rise tower block in the city of Liverpool, England, designed by the architect Richard Seifert. The tower was used as a backdrop to the performance art piece La Princesse. The building was built in the 1960s but was demolished in 2009, together with the shops in front of Lime Street Railway Station as part of the Lime Street Gateway development scheme.
