= Liverpool Lime Street railway station =

Principal railway station in Merseyside, England

Liverpool Lime Street High Level
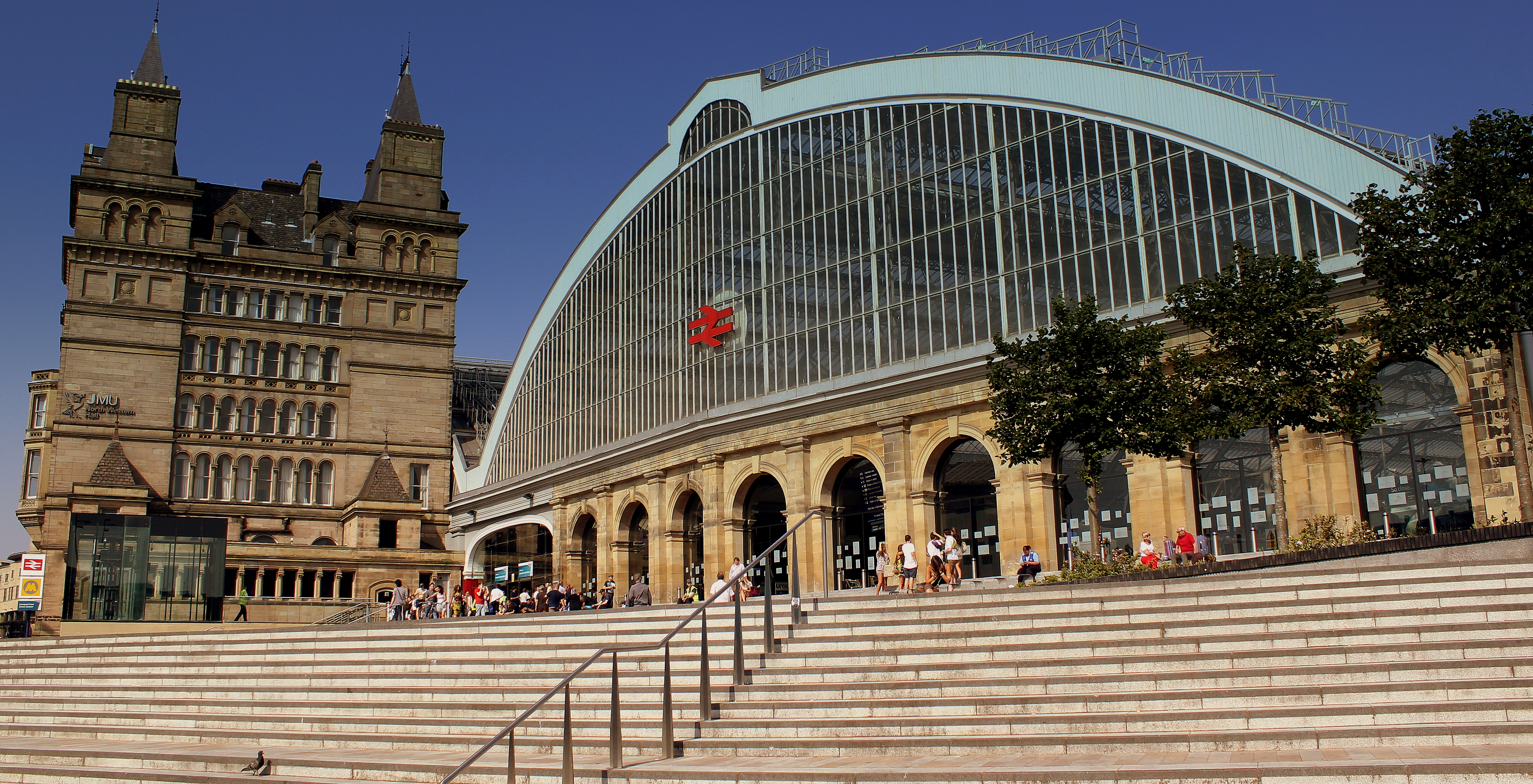
- Station entrance on Lime Street

General information
- Location: Lime Street, Liverpool, Merseyside, England
- Coordinates: 53.4075°N 2.9784°W
- Grid reference: SJ351905
- Manager: Network Rail
- Transit authority: Merseytravel
- Lines: City Line, National Rail
- Platforms: 10
- Connections: Lime Street Low Level

Other information
- Station code: LIV
- Fare zone: C1
- Classification: DfT category A

History
- Original company: Liverpool and Manchester Railway
- Pre-grouping: London and North Western Railway
- Post-grouping: London, Midland and Scottish Railway

Key dates
- 15 August 1836: Opened

Passengers
- 2021/22: ▲10.464 million
- Interchange: ▲1.134 million
- 2022/23: ▲11.102 million
- Interchange: ▼0.862 million
- 2023/24: ▲12.279 million
- Interchange: ▲0.918 million
- 2024/25: ▲14.430 million
- Interchange: ▲0.987 million
- 2025/26: ▲15.812 million
- Interchange: ▲1.060 million
Location
Notes
- Passenger statistics from the Office of Rail and Road

Liverpool Lime Street Low Level

General information
- Manager: Merseyrail
- Line: Wirral line
- Platforms: 1
- Connections: Lime Street High Level

Other information
- Station code: LVL
- Fare zone: C1
- Classification: DfT category D

Key dates
- 1977: Opened
Location

Liverpool Lime Street is a railway station complex located on Lime Street, in Liverpool city centre, Merseyside, England. Although publicly a single and unified station, it is operationally divided into two: High Level, the principal station serving Liverpool and the oldest still-operating grand terminus main line station in the world; and Low Level, an underground Wirral line station (part of the Merseyrail network), which is connected to the main terminal building by a pedestrian subway below street-level. Despite their operational distinctions, both stations are integrated from a passenger perspective, sharing signage, access points and overall station identity. Lime Street High Level is one of 18 stations managed by Network Rail, while Low Level is managed directly by the train operator, Merseyrail.

A branch of the West Coast Main Line from London Euston terminates at Lime Street, as does the original Liverpool and Manchester Railway.

The station building was designed by John Cunningham, Arthur Holme and John Foster Jr and built by the Liverpool and Manchester Railway to replace their existing terminus at Crown Street, which was deemed to be too far from the city centre; construction beginning in October 1833 and the station opening in August 1836. Due to growing popularity, the station was later expanded by Joseph Locke and others in 1849 and again by William Baker and Francis Stevenson in 1867, which included the construction of the world’s largest arched train shed at the time as well as a second train shed being added in 1879.

Following nationalisation of the railways in 1948, Lime Street station saw various upgrades, including improved signalling, a redeveloped concourse, and new retail and office space. Electric rail services to Crewe began in 1962, followed by the station’s first InterCity service to London in 1966. In the 1970s, with the commencement of Merseyrail Wirral line services to Lime Street Low Level and the closure of all other long-distance termini in Liverpool, Lime Street became the city’s main rail hub. The Pendolino service was launched in the station by Virgin Trains at a ceremonial unveiling in 2003, improving travel times to London; full electrification of the Liverpool and Manchester railway's former route was completed in May 2015.

The station is fronted by the former North Western Hotel, a large Renaissance Revival style building, which has been the Radisson Red Liverpool Hotel since December 2022; and the Concourse House office block with several retailers stood outside the southern train shed from the 1960s until their demolition in 2010. Lime Street is the largest and oldest railway station in Liverpool, being awarded 5 stars in Britain’s 100 Best Railway Stations by Simon Jenkins, one of only ten to achieve this.

== History ==
=== Origins ===
The original terminus of the 1830 Liverpool and Manchester Railway (L&MR) was located at Crown Street, in Edge Hill, to the east of and outside the city centre. However, even before Edge Hill had been opened, it was apparent that there was a pressing need for another station to be built, which would this time be closer to the city centre. Accordingly, during October 1833, the construction commenced on a purpose-built station at Lime Street in the city centre; the land was purchased from Liverpool Corporation for £9,000 (equivalent to £930,000 in 2025). The means of connecting the new station to L&MR's network came in the form of a twin-track tunnel, which had been constructed between Edge Hill and the site of the new Lime Street station a year prior to work being started on the station itself; during the construction effort, the tunnel was frequently used to transport building materials for the station onto the site. The station was designed by the architects John Cunningham, Arthur Holme, and John Foster Jr.

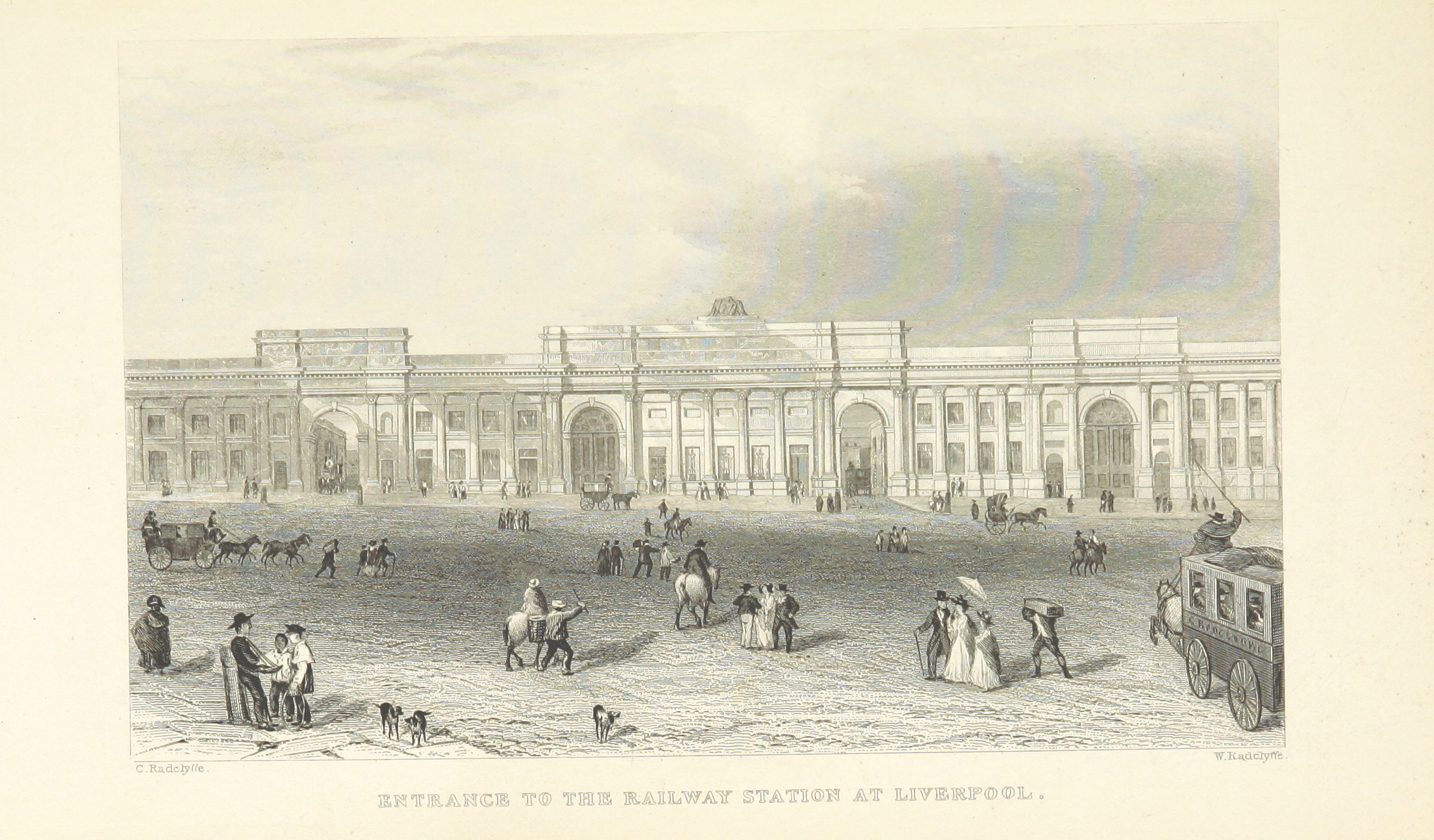
A period depiction of the original Lime Street station frontage, circa 1839

During August 1836, Lime Street station was officially opened to the public, although the construction process was not completed until the following year. This building was designed with four large gateways, two of which were intentionally non-functional. For its early operations, as a consequence of the steep incline uphill from Lime Street to Edge Hill, trains would be halted at Edge Hill and the locomotives detached from the trains; the practice of the era was for the passenger carriages to be taken down by gravity, during which the rate of descent would be controlled by brakemen located in a brake van. The return journey was achieved via the use of a stationary steam engine located at Edge Hill, which would be used to haul the carriages up to Edge Hill by rope. This system was constructed by the local engineering firm Mather, Dixon and Company, who worked under the direction of the engineer John Grantham. During 1870, this practice came to an end; instead, trains would enter and depart the station by conventional means.

=== Early expansion ===
Lime Street (Liverpool) and Crewe Stations Extensions Act 1847
- Act of Parliament
- Parliament of the United Kingdom
- Long title: An Act to empower the London and North-western Railway Company to enlarge their Stations at Liverpool and Crewe; and for other Purposes.
- Citation: 10 & 11 Vict. c. ccxxviii

Dates
- Royal assent: 22 July 1847

Text of statute as originally enacted

Lime Street station was a near-instant success with the railway-going public. Within six years of its opening, the rapid growth of the railways had necessitated the expansion of the original station. An early plan for the enlarged station would have involved the erection of an iron roof, similar to that found at Euston station (pre-1960s rebuilding) in London, which was a ridge roof supported by iron columns. However, a different proposal quickly gained the approval of the station committee. A single curved roof was produced by a collaborative effort; designed and load tested by engineer Joseph Locke, with construction contracted to iron founder Richard Turner, and the work checked by engineer William Fairbairn and manufacturer John Kennedy. The expansion work was authorised by the Lime Street (Liverpool) and Crewe Stations Extensions Act 1847 (10 & 11 Vict. c. ccxxviii), and performed at a cost of £15,000 (equivalent to £1,650,000 in 2025) and was completed during 1849, by which time the noted architect William Tite had also been involved. Meanwhile, during 1845, the L&MR had been absorbed by its principal business partner, the Grand Junction Railway (GJR); the following year the GJR became part of the London and North Western Railway. Amongst the features which date back to the 1846–1849 rebuild of the station are a group of four columns which adjoin former Platform 1, they have been attributed to engineer Edward Woods.

By 1857, a pair of granite columns had been erected outside the station entrance; over time, these had become known as the "Candlesticks". During 1867, further expansion of Lime Street station was required to cope with operational demands; changes included the present northern arched train shed. Designed by William Baker and Francis Stevenson (Note: William Baker was the L&NWR's chief engineer at the time of the northern roof construction. Stevenson, who was Baker's assistant engineer at the time of the construction, succeeded Baker as the L&NWR's chief engineer upon Baker's death in 1878.) the train shed featured a span of 200 feet (61 m), leading to it being recognised as the largest such structure in the world at the time. It was also the first train shed in which iron was used throughout. During 1879, a second parallel southern train shed was completed, which had been designed by Stevenson and E.W. Ives. This second train shed featured dry construction techniques, (Note: That is, without the use of mortar.) while each bay reportedly took only three days to build. (Note: Edward William Ives' method was later applied to the design and construction of the Liverpool Overhead Railway.) A further expansion required the acquisition of the site of St Andrew's Church in Renshaw Street, causing the church to relocate and be rebuilt in 1893.

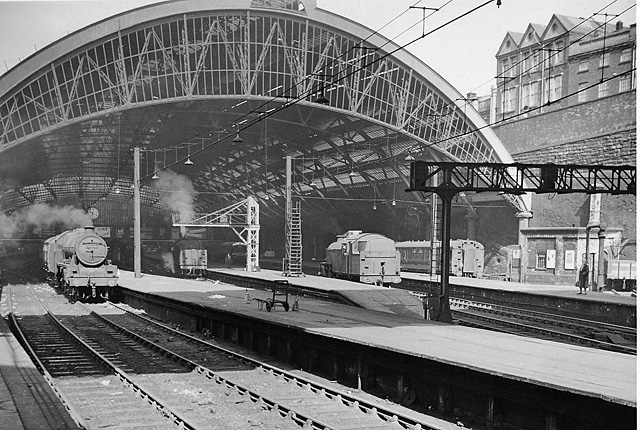
Inward view of Liverpool Lime Street station, 1959

Lime Street station is fronted by a large building, built in the Renaissance Revival style, which formerly housed the North Western Hotel. Designed by Alfred Waterhouse, the building was built during 1871 and served as student accommodation for Liverpool John Moores University from 1996. It was announced on 28 September 2018 that the building will be restored as a hotel by the Marcus Worthington Group at a cost of £30m. It reopened as the Radisson RED Liverpool Hotel in 2020.

As a result of the Railways Act 1921, which grouped the majority of railway companies together to create the Big Four, Lime Street station passed into the ownership of the newly formed London, Midland and Scottish (LMS) railway. The station played an early role in the development of mail trains, the Post Office first dispatched mail by train from Lime Street.

=== British Rail era ===
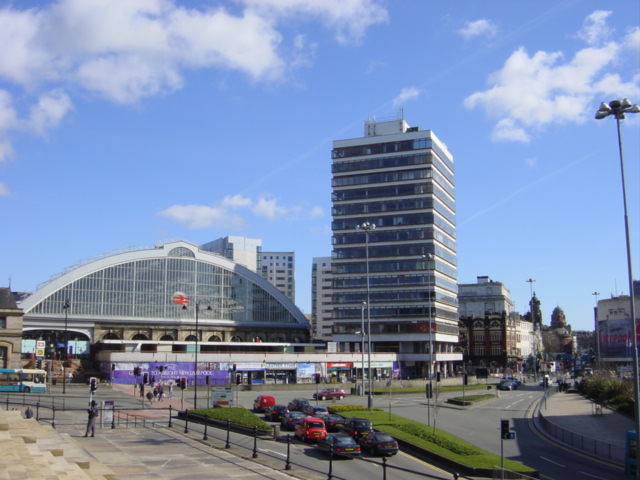
The station's frontage seen in 2006, including the Concourse House tower block and a row of shops, which were demolished in 2009

Upon nationalisation of the railways during 1948, Lime Street Station became a part of the London Midland Region of British Railways. On 28 January 1948, a new signal box controlling movements in and around Lime Street was commissioned; this signal box would remain in use for almost 70 years, being one of the last lever frames boxes still in operation by the time of its decommissioning during 2017–2018. During 1955, the station concourse was redeveloped and modernised. During 1959, preparatory work commenced at Lime Street for the first stage of the electrification of the West Coast Main Line. On 1 January 1962, regular electric services between Lime Street and Crewe were officially started.

The railway lines to former platforms 10 and 11 were removed by 1965. On 18 April 1966, the station hosted the launch of its first InterCity service, which saw the introduction of a regular 100 mph (160 km/h) service between Liverpool and London. On 11 August 1968, the Fifteen Guinea Special, a return service to Carlisle, was hauled by the Black Five locomotive 45110 from Liverpool to Manchester Victoria and back. Arriving back at Lime Street at 7:58 pm, this train marked the end of British Railways' final steam-hauled mainline passenger journey.

The Merseyrail map in use until 2018, when Maghull North was included. Lime Street is visible on the right-hand side of the central loop

An office tower block named Concourse House, along with a row of small retail outlets, used to stand outside the southern train shed, obscuring the arches. These dated from the 1960s and, by the 2000s, had become run down. They were demolished as part of a comprehensive refurbishment completed in 2010.

During the 1970s, a new urban rail network, known as Merseyrail was developed, resulting in four terminus stations being taken out of use in Liverpool and Birkenhead centres. (Note: These were Birkenhead Woodside, Liverpool Riverside, Liverpool Exchange and Liverpool Central High Level stations.) As a consequence of this restructuring and rationalisation, only Lime Street remained as a terminus, thus serving as a central point for the whole region for medium- and long-haul routes. At the same time, the Merseyrail network provided commuters with ease of access across the whole Merseyside region to the one remaining large terminus.

Between 1983 and 1984, the station concourse was again altered and refurbished at a total estimated cost of £7.4 million. This refurbishment included the construction of the black glass building which partially surrounds platforms inside the northern train shed, as well as the glass screen which separates the concourse from platforms inside the southern train shed. The alterations also coincided with the opening of the International Garden Festival. On 29 November 1984, the new development was officially opened by Princess Anne.

=== Privatisation era ===
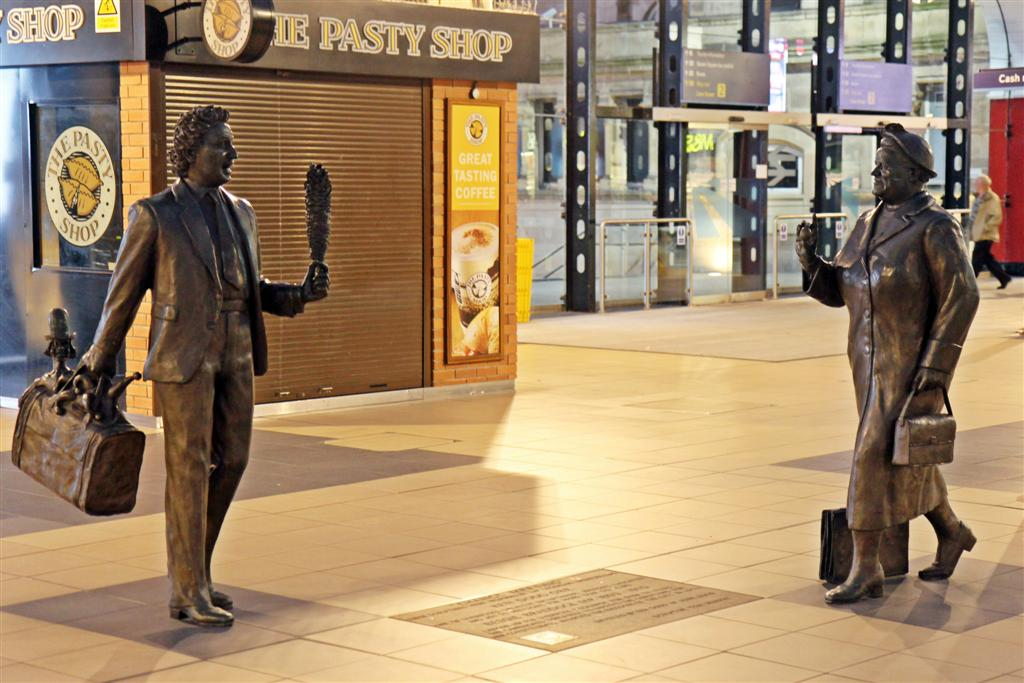
Statues of Ken Dodd and Bessie Braddock, installed in 2009

On 20 October 2003, the new Pendolino service operated by private rail operator Virgin Trains, which introduced a faster service between Liverpool and London, was ceremonially unveiled in the presence of the company's founder and chief executive officer Richard Branson. Designed from the onset to be a tilting train, it quickly replaced much of the previously-allocated locomotives and rolling stock used on the West Coast Main Line, namely Classes 86, 87 and 90 electric locomotives and Mark 2 and Mark 3 coaching stock. Prior to this, the fleet had been first introduced into passenger services from Birmingham International to Manchester Piccadilly on 23 July 2002 to coincide with the opening of the 2002 Commonwealth Games in Manchester.

To help celebrate several high-profile occasions, such as Liverpool's role as European Capital of Culture during 2008, and the city's 800th anniversary in 2007, a £35 million redevelopment grant was issued for the station and its immediate surroundings. The Lime Street Gateway Project saw the demolition of the aging retail parade and office block located in front of the station, and an improved frontage and public plaza constructed in its place. Subsequently, Lime Street was voted Station of the Year 2010 at the National Rail Awards. The development was overseen by English Partnerships and was completed in October 2010.

The main concourse features a pair of statues of comedian Ken Dodd and politician Bessie Braddock, a work entitled "Chance Meeting" by sculptor Tom Murphy, which were unveiled by Ken Dodd himself during June 2009. On 31 August 2014, the Earl of Wessex unveiled a memorial to the Liverpool Pals at the station. The memorial, which comprises two bronze friezes, was also sculpted by Tom Murphy. During 2014, former Platforms 1–5 were fully refurbished by national rail infrastructure maintenance company Network Rail.

==== Electrification to Manchester and Wigan ====
Completion of electrification of the former Liverpool and Manchester Railway's route, and the line to Wigan via St Helens Central, during May 2015 led to a recast of timetables. This included the introduction of a brand new TransPennine Express service to Newcastle via Manchester Victoria, running alongside the existing service to Scarborough via Warrington Central and Manchester Piccadilly. It was unclear whether suitable electric rolling stock would be available in time for the completion of the work, but it was confirmed during April 2014 that electric trains would be available to operate the new services. The first trains were introduced from March 2015, initially to Manchester Airport, with services to Wigan North Western, Manchester Victoria and Warrington Bank Quay following over the course of the year.

==== 2017 wall collapse ====
At around 17:45 on 28 February 2017, the station was cut off after a wall collapsed into the cutting between Lime Street and Edge Hill, causing more than 200 tonnes of debris to fall onto all four of the tracks running into the throat of the station.

While the line was blocked, Virgin trains terminated at Runcorn and other trains terminated at Liverpool South Parkway. The debris was cleared up, with repairs made to the overhead wires, and the station reopened just over a week later on 8 March 2017.

==== 2017–18 station remodelling ====
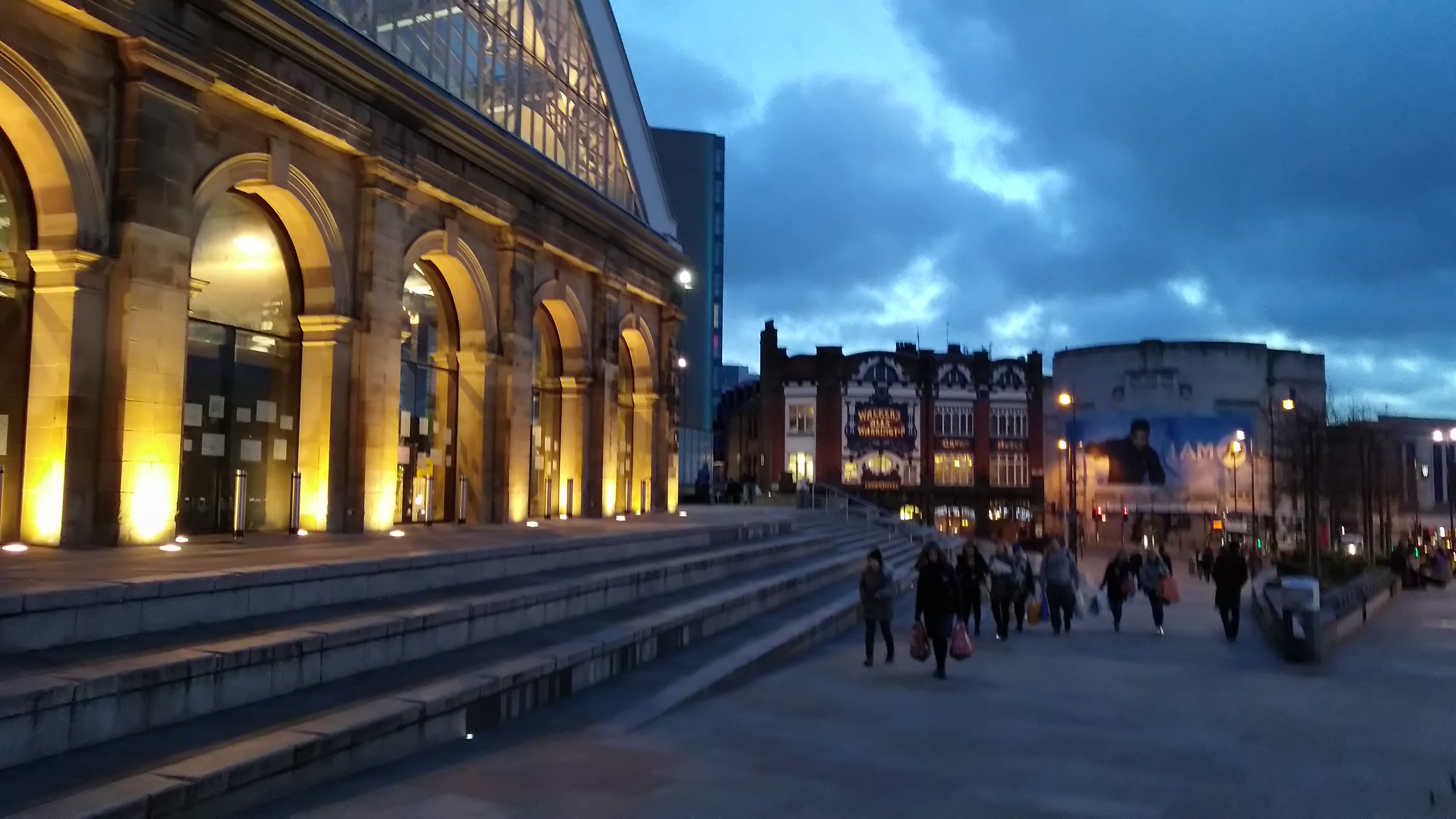
The station at night, 2018

During 2017, work commenced upon a £340 million remodelling programme intended to improve Lime Street station by modernising its signalling systems, install new platforms and to better conform with current demands. A major impetus for the work was the age of the station's signalling, the core of which dated from the 1940s and was increasingly difficult to acquire knowledgeable staff for its operation and maintenance; furthermore, as resignalling of the existing station layout offered only slightly less work than the implementation of an entirely fresh layout, only without the benefits of being able to do so, it was decided to take the rare occasion as a convenient chance to make various alterations and improvements at the same time.

Perhaps the most noticeable change made for the perspective of passengers was the creation of an additional pair of platforms, which were built in the large space available between platforms 7 and 8 (now 6 and 9); all of the other platforms were also lengthened and widened as a part of this work.

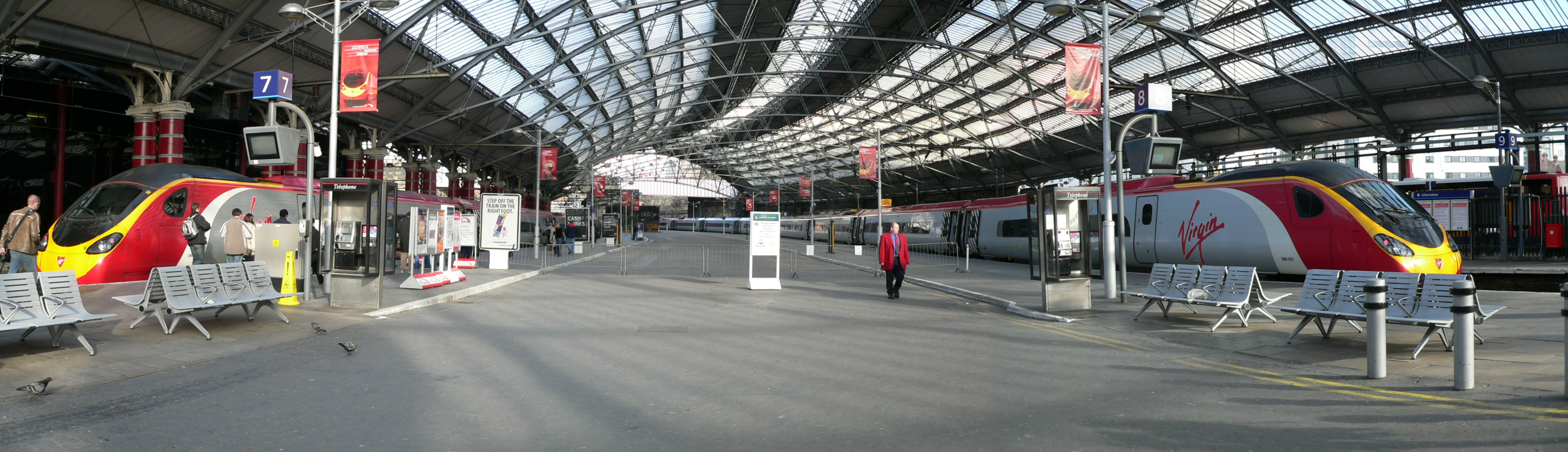
The former "cab road", between former platforms 7 and 8 (now 6 and 9), which was replaced by two new platforms

According to industry publication Rail Engineer, the old layout of the station was relatively complex and posed some operational difficulties; many of the alterations sought to ease or eliminate some of these issues. As the curving of Platform 6 (now 5) had been a source of long-term driver difficulty in maintaining signal sightings, the platform was reprofiled to be straighter, permanently ending the problem. The new layout provides five platforms on each side of the station; beyond being simpler, the change facilitates the departure speed being increased from 15 to 25 mph and is also compatible with being maintained by modern mechanised equipment. In conjunction with the layout changes, new Mk3D overhead line equipment was installed along the route between Lime Street station and Edge Hill. Control of the signalling was transferred over to the centralised Manchester Rail Operating Centre.

The remodelling of Lime Street had been deemed necessary in order to provide the capacity for additional services to Glasgow Central, which are set to start during 2019. Various new retail outlets, along with a supermarket, were also established by work performed during the programme. To accommodate the work, the station was mostly closed over a twenty-three day period, which started on 30 September 2017; during the latter stages of this blockade, limited services ran to/from Huyton and some destinations beyond this. The station closed from 2 June 2018 to 29 July 2018 to allow more of the remodelling to be undertaken.

==== West Coast Partnership ====
In August 2019, it was announced that Avanti West Coast would operate the West Coast Partnership franchise from December 2019. As part of the award, the new operator would provide two trains per hour between Liverpool Lime Street and London Euston from December 2022, subject to approval by the Office of Rail and Road.

== Station layout ==
Liverpool Lime Street is divided into two sections: the main line station, which offers national inter-city and regional overground services including local City Line routes, and services on the Wirral Line on the Merseyrail network, located underground between the main line station and St George's Hall.

== Main line station ==
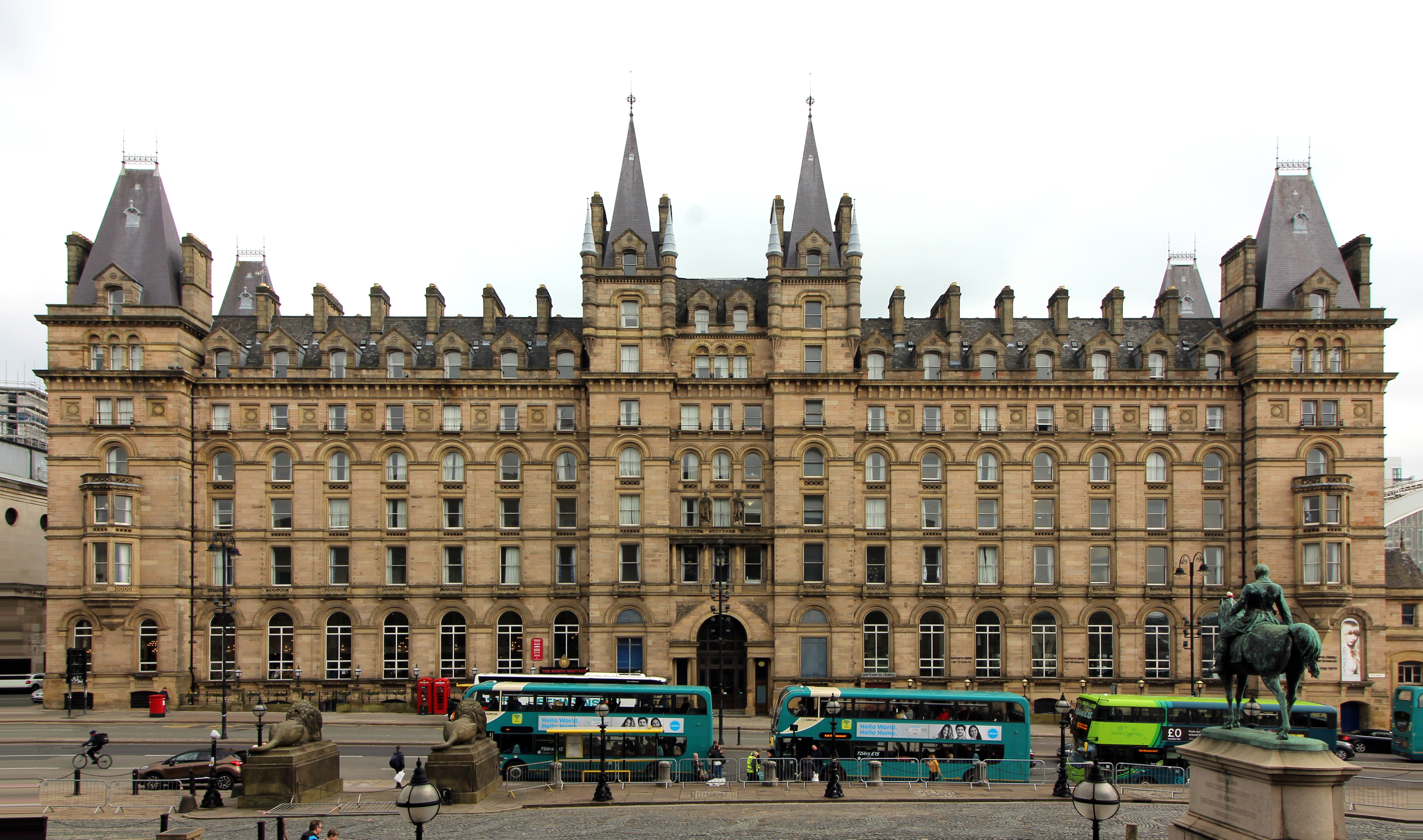
The station is fronted by the Radisson RED Liverpool Hotel, built in the Renaissance Revival style resembling a French Château

The main line station, known as Liverpool Lime Street High Level (station code: LIV) is covered by the vast iron and glass roofs dating from the 1870s. The north train shed is fronted by a 1871 French Château styled building, occupied by the Radisson RED Liverpool Hotel. The hotel was scheduled to open in the first quarter of 2022.

Platforms 1 to 5 are shorter than 6 to 10, the latter dealing mainly with long-distance services to London, Birmingham, Leeds, Sheffield and Norwich. Access to platforms 1–5 is through a ticket inspection barrier, while former platform 7 was gated with the creation of new shops and facilities. Former platforms 8 and 9 were still open.

In 2009, new buildings were erected in the old "cab road" area between former platforms 7 and 8. Until the 2018 station remodelling, these housed customer lounges, the Virgin Trains customer service point and an ATM; there were retail units which had coffee shops amongst the units.

Platform numbering (Note: Bracketed () items have no track.)
–2018	2018–
Northern train shed
1	(0)
2	1
3	2
4	3
5	4
6	5
Southern train shed
E	(E)
7	6
(Cab road)	7
(Cab road)	8
8	9
9	10

There were also four non-passenger tracks. Three of these were headshunts, created in the northern trainshed to turn locomotives around: Track A, in between former platforms 1 and 2; track B, serving former platforms 3 and 4; and track D, for former platforms 5 and 6. There is also a platform with no passenger service between former platforms 6 and 7, known as platform E, or sometimes affectionately as platform 6¾.

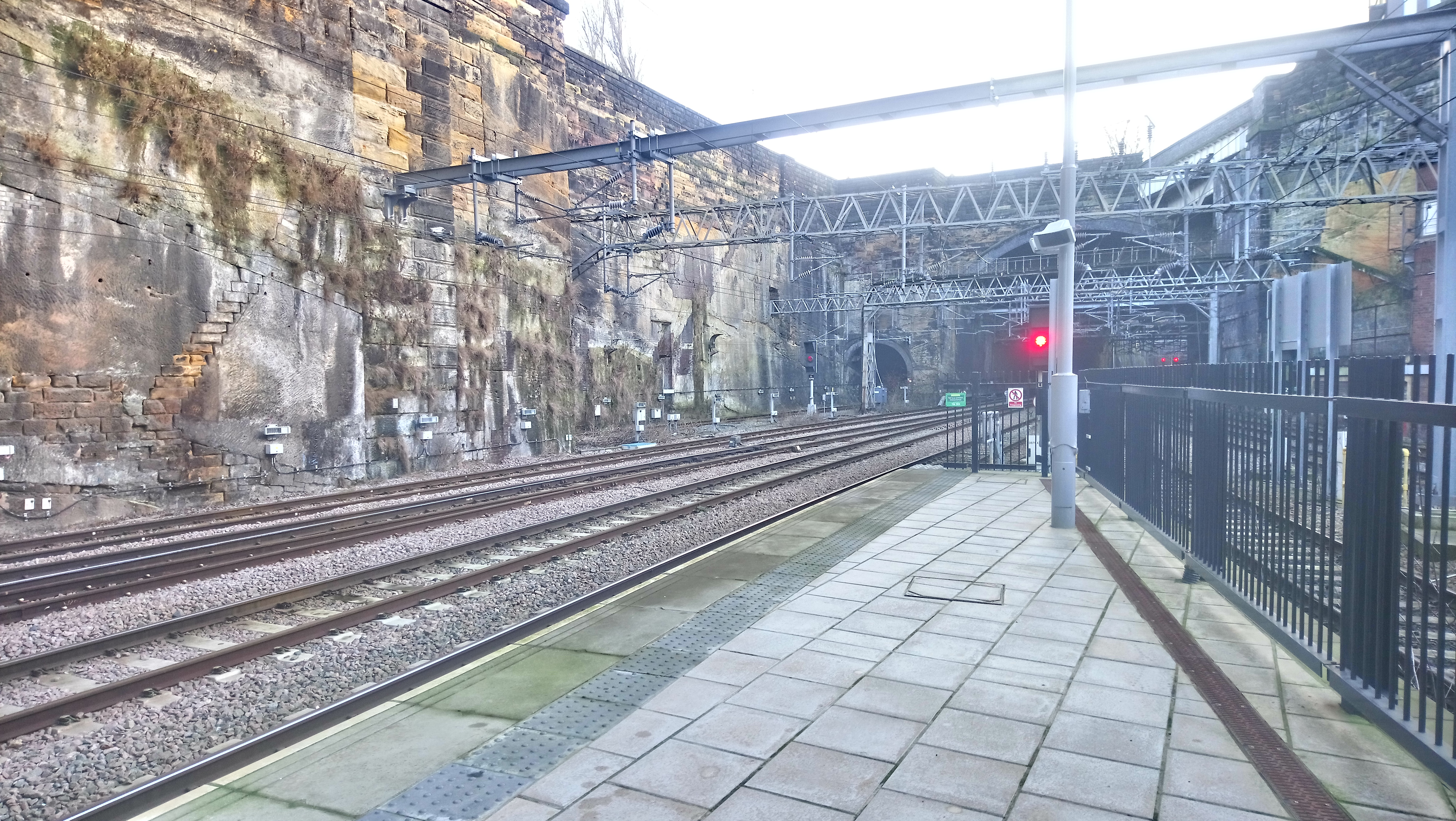
The view from the end of platform 6, looking along the cutting

=== Facilities ===
Toilets, booking offices, shops, a left-luggage office, taxi ranks and coffee bars are amongst the facilities provided. The main booking office is operated by Northern Trains. The concourse of the station contains several shops, including branches of M&S Simply Food, Starbucks, Upper Crust, Krispy Kreme, Costa Coffee, Boots and WHSmith. Car parking is managed by APCOA. The station also has two taxi ranks.

=== Onward transport links ===
The station has bus services to Liverpool One bus station and Liverpool John Lennon Airport. These are provided by Arriva North West.

=== Services ===
The main station is currently served by six train operating companies; the general off-peak service pattern in trains per hour (tph) / day (tpd) is:

Avanti West Coast:

An Avanti West Coast Class 807 at platform 9

- 2 tph to London Euston; of which:
  - 1 tph calls at Runcorn, Lichfield Trent Valley and Tamworth, using Pendolino trains
  - 1 tph calls at Liverpool South Parkway, Runcorn, Crewe and Milton Keynes Central, using Evero trains.

East Midlands Railway:

An East Midlands Railway Class 170 unit at platform 8

- 1 tph to Norwich, via Warrington Central, Manchester Piccadilly, Sheffield, Nottingham and Peterborough. Late afternoon and evening services terminate or start at Nottingham.

London Northwestern Railway:

A London Northwestern Railway Class 350 at platform 6

- 2 tph to Birmingham New Street, via Crewe and Stafford; of which:
  - 1 tph calls at the local stations between Runcorn and Crewe.

Northern Trains:

A Northern Trains Class 150 at platform 8

- 1 tph to Manchester Airport, via Lea Green, Newton-le-Willows and Manchester Piccadilly
- 1 tph to Manchester Oxford Road, via Warrington Central
- 1 tph to Warrington Central (stopping)
- 2 tph to Wigan North Western, via St Helens Central
- 1 tph to Blackpool North, via St Helens Central, Wigan North Western and Preston.

TransPennine Express:

A Transpennine Express Class 185 at platform 7

North Route, via the Chat Moss line:

- 1 tph to Newcastle, via Manchester Victoria, Leeds and York.
- 1 tph to Hull, via Manchester Victoria and Leeds.

South Route

- 1 tph to Cleethorpes, via Warrington Central, Manchester Piccadilly and Sheffield.

West Coast Main Line

- 3 tpd to Glasgow Central, via Preston and Carlisle.

Transport for Wales:

- 1 tph to Llandudno, via Runcorn and Chester, using the Halton Curve. This service terminates at Chester on Sundays.

Preceding station	National Rail	Following station
Terminus	Avanti West Coast West Coast Main Line Liverpool branch	Runcorn
Terminus	East Midlands Railway Liverpool – Manchester – Manchester – Sheffield	Liverpool South Parkway
Terminus	London Northwestern Railway Birmingham – Liverpool	Mossley Hill
Terminus	Transport for Wales Rail Liverpool to Llandudno	Liverpool South Parkway
Terminus	TransPennine Express South TransPennine	Liverpool South Parkway
Terminus	TransPennine Express North TransPennine	Newton-le-Willows
Terminus	TransPennine Express North TransPennine	Lea Green
Terminus	TransPennine Express Anglo-Scottish Route; Liverpool Lime Street to Glasgow Central; Limited service	St Helens Central
Terminus	Northern Trains Liverpool Lime Street to Manchester Oxford Road via Warrington Central	Edge Hill
Terminus	Northern Trains Liverpool Lime Street to Manchester Oxford Road via Warrington Central	Mossley Hill
Terminus	Northern Trains Liverpool Lime Street to Blackpool North	Huyton
Terminus	Northern Trains Liverpool–Wigan North Western/Blackpool North Line	Edge Hill
Terminus	Northern Trains Liverpool–Wigan North Western/Blackpool North Line	Wavertree Technology Park
Terminus	Northern Trains Liverpool Lime Street to Manchester Airport via Newton-le-Willows	Edge Hill
Terminus	Northern Trains Liverpool Lime Street to Manchester Airport via Newton-le-Willows	Wavertree Technology Park

=== Proposed services ===
==== Long Term Rail Strategy Proposals ====
In a long term rail strategy by Merseytravel, new direct services to Cardiff, Bristol, Leicester, Derby, Glasgow Central and Edinburgh Waverley have been proposed.

==== Virgin Trains Open Access Proposal ====
In June 2019, Virgin Trains lodged an application for an open access service from London Euston to Liverpool Lime Street, calling at Nuneaton, Tamworth, Lichfield Trent Valley and Liverpool South Parkway to rival the future West Coast Partnership franchise Avanti West Coast from December 2022.

==== Future Northern and TransPennine franchises ====
In November 2018, it was revealed by Transport for the North several options for the future Northern and TransPennine franchise. Some options for Liverpool include extension of Liverpool to Crewe services towards Stoke-on-Trent and Alsager, increasing Liverpool to Blackpool North services and a new Liverpool to Leicester service via Crewe, Stoke-on-Trent, Uttoxeter and Derby. The Leicester service could be operated by either TransPennine Express or the future East Midlands Franchise.

==== Chester, Wales and Shrewsbury via the Halton Curve ====
The completion of the upgrade of the Halton Curve in 2018 provides a second rail route between Liverpool and Chester, and permits the introduction of new direct services from Liverpool to Wrexham, Llandudno and other parts of North Wales. As part of the new Wales & Borders franchise services to Chester were introduced in May 2019, with future services to Llandudno and Shrewsbury every hour and services to Cardiff every two hours planned.

== Underground station ==
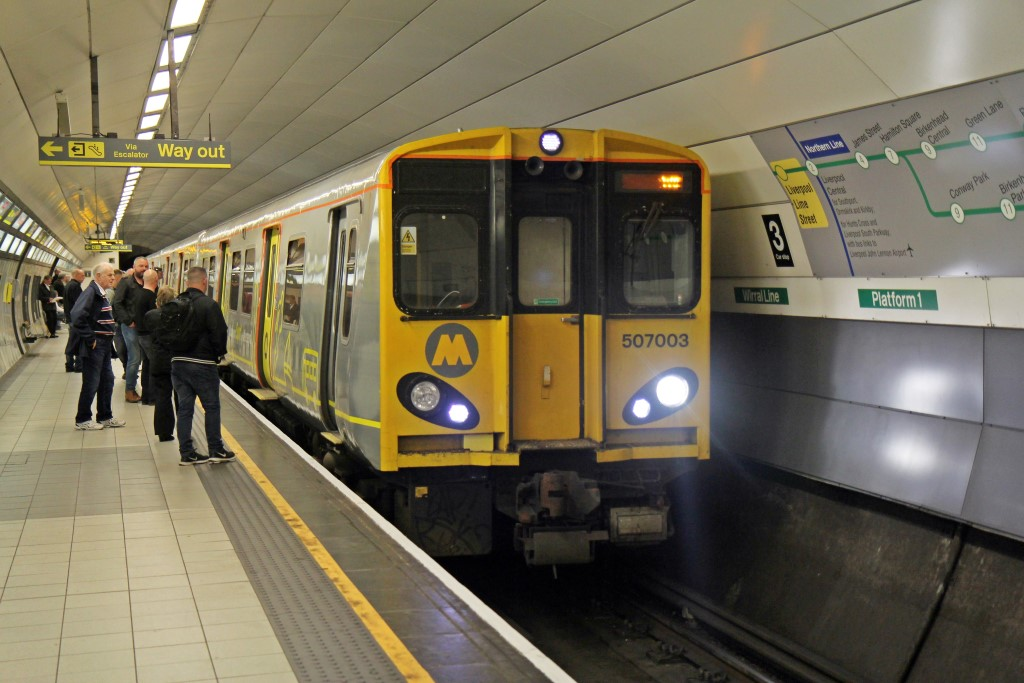
A Merseyrail Class 507 unit at the refurbished Wirral Line platform, 2015

The underground station, known as Liverpool Lime Street Low Level consists of a single platform (A), alongside the 1970s Liverpool Loop tunnel and a ticket hall above. The station, which was opened in 1977, is connected to the main line station by means of a pedestrian subway and escalators; it is accessed via a long passageway which crosses beneath Lime Street itself and by a lift from the main concourse.

=== Refurbishment in 2013 ===
Network Rail announced in early 2013 that Lime Street was to be the third station to be refurbished as part of the £40 million investment, which would see all Merseyrail underground stations refurbished, excluding Conway Park; this included the refurbishment of the platform and the booking hall. The station refurbishment work took place between April and August 2013.

=== Subway refurbishment in 2014 ===
The subway linking the underground station to the mainline station was refurbished in June 2014. The subway was fitted out with new tiles, lighting, flooring and automatic doors to some of the entrances.

=== Recent history ===
The underground station had wi-fi installed in January 2016.

In March 2016, it was announced that the Wirral Line loop would be having its track renewed. The underground station was closed between 3 January 2017 and 18 June 2017 whilst the works took place.

=== Services ===
Merseyrail operates the following services in trains per hour (tph):

All trains travel through to Liverpool Central and Hamilton Square, of which:

- 4 tph continue to New Brighton
- 4 tph continue to West Kirby
- 4 tph continue to Chester
- 2 tph continue to Ellesmere Port.

To reach destinations on the Northern Line of the network, passengers must either use the Wirral Line and change at Liverpool Central or walk the short distance to the station.

Preceding station	National Rail	Following station
Moorfields (one-way operation)	Merseyrail; Wirral Line	Liverpool Central towards New Brighton, West Kirby, Chester or Ellesmere Port
