= GoMedia =

British entertainment system company

- Type: Broadcast, mobile and OTT solutions
- Industry: Media & Telecoms
- Founded: 2015
- Headquarters: Kings Cross, London, England
- Key people: Matt Seaman (Chief Executive); Roger Matthews (Managing Director)
- Products: Onboard entertainment service, Video on demand, Pay TV using BYOD, Live Journey Information Services

GoMedia is a British company which supplies a management system which delivers entertainment packages including featuring films to travelers on trains and coaches, including on Eurostar trains. The system also gives real-time travel information. Rather than using a monitor on the seat in front of the passenger, it uses the passenger's own device ("Bring Your Own Device" or BYOD) such as mobiles and tablets. It uses the vehicle's own Wi-Fi rather than the passenger's independent mobile network for on-board infotainment.

Their BEAM management system is the first app of its kind in the UK, and is used across Virgin West Coast and East Coast. The films available include Independence Day: Resurgence, which formed the foundation of Virgin Trains’ BEAM launch at Euston Station, London in late 2016. TV box sets from BBC Worldwide, cartoons, games, digital newspapers and magazines are also offered. The free on-demand entertainment provided includes films, catch-up TV, box sets, cartoons, games, newspapers and magazines. A tracker app also shows the train's exact location. GoMedia has its own encoding and offline DRM service offering.

In 2020, GoMedia got acquired by Icomera UK.

GoMedia launched on the following operators:

2016:

- Eurostar Onboard Entertainment
- Virgin Trains East and West Coast BEAM

2017:

- c2c Vista
- Greater Anglia Stream
- London Northwestern Railway Loop Wi-Fi
- National Express VUER
- West Midlands Railways Loop Wi-Fi

2018:

- Boltbus
- Chiltern Railways Chil.tv
- Greyhound Coaches
- TransPennine Express Exstream

2019:

- Avanti West Coast
- Great Western Railway
- SBB
- South Western Railway SWRStream

2020:

- Capitol Corridor
- San Joaquin
- ZIPAIR

2021:

- Lumo

== See also ==
- Hybrid Broadcast Broadband TV
- List of digital distribution platforms for mobile devices
- Over-the-top content
