= InterCity West Coast =

1997–2019 UK railway franchise

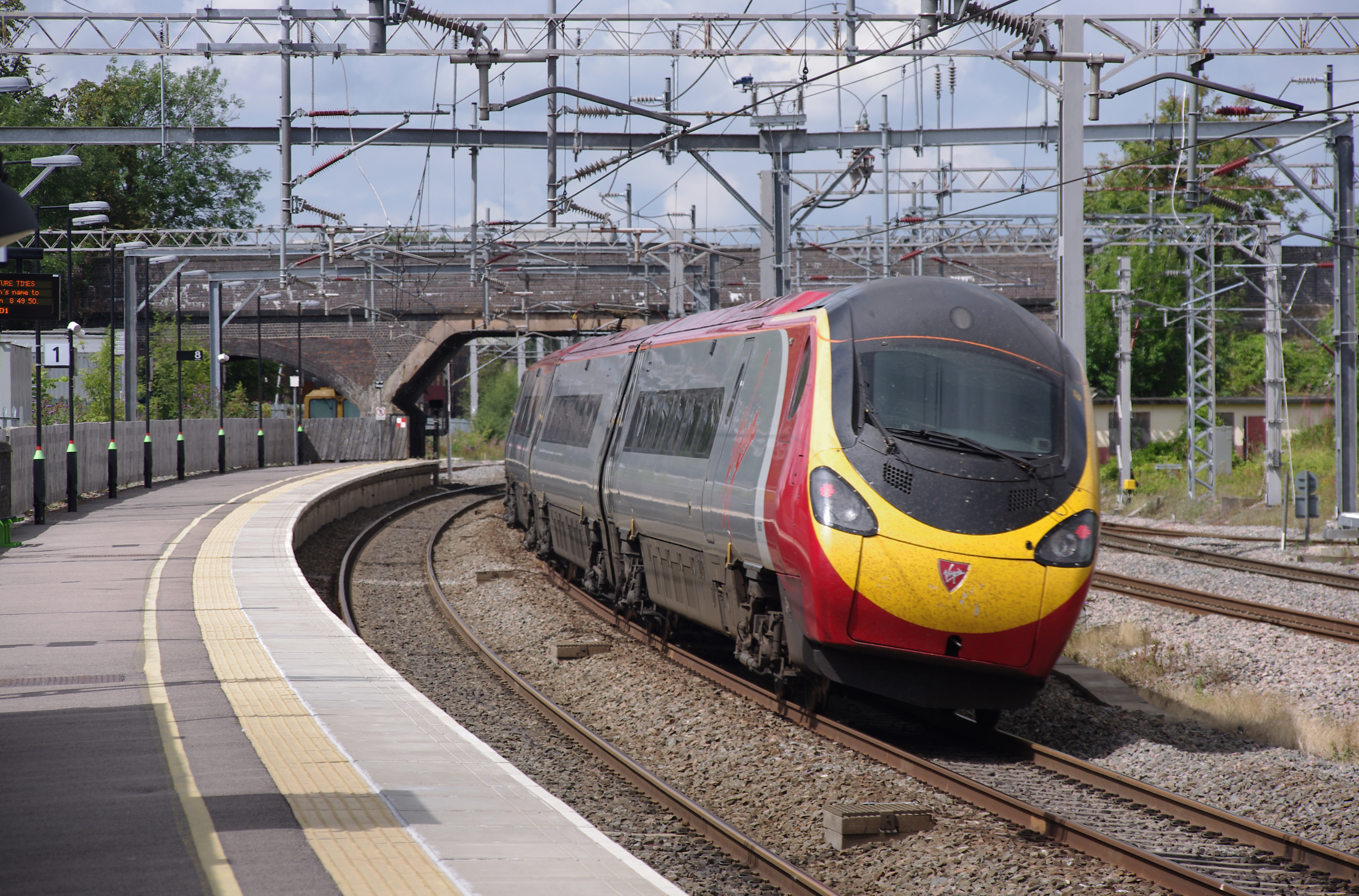
- Virgin Trains Class 390 Pendolino passing through Lichfield Trent Valley in August 2011
- Operator: Avanti West Coast
- Main Route: West Coast Main Line
- Stations called at: 44
- Stations operated: 17
- Dates of operation: 9 March 1997 – 7 December 2019

Technical
- Track gauge: 1,435 mm (4 ft 8 1/2 in)

InterCity West Coast (ICWC) was a 1997–2019 railway franchise in the United Kingdom for passenger trains on the West Coast Main Line (and branches thereof), between London Euston, the West Midlands, North Wales, Liverpool, Manchester, Carlisle, Edinburgh, Glasgow, and other major destinations between.

The franchise was formed during the privatisation of British Rail and transferred to the private sector on 9 March 1997, when Virgin Trains commenced operations. It was due to be re-let in December 2012, with FirstGroup announced as the winning bidder; this decision was later reversed after the discovery of irregularities in the franchise letting process. In December 2012, Virgin Trains was awarded an extension to continue to run the franchise until November 2014, which was extended in several increments until December 2019.

The InterCity West Coast franchise was superseded on 8 December 2019 by the West Coast Partnership, currently operated by Avanti West Coast.

== Services ==
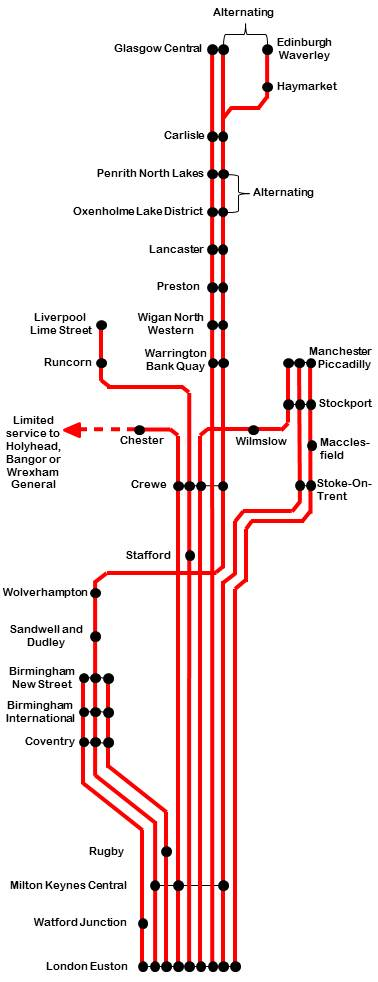
A map showing the off-peak service pattern each hour

As of March 2017, these were the services offered:

	Route	Calling at	Stock	Frequency
A	London Euston – Glasgow Central or Edinburgh Waverley via Birmingham New Street	Milton Keynes Central, Coventry, Birmingham International, Birmingham New Street, Sandwell and Dudley, Wolverhampton, Crewe, Warrington Bank Quay, Wigan North Western, Preston, Lancaster, Oxenholme Lake District (1tp2h), Penrith (1tp2h), Carlisle, then either (Glasgow Central) or (Haymarket, Edinburgh Waverley). Trains call alternately at Oxenholme Lake District and Penrith. Before 1 pm, trains to Glasgow Central call at Penrith and trains to Edinburgh call at Oxenholme Lake District. After 1 pm, this is reversed.	Pendolino & Super Voyager	1tph
B	London Euston – Birmingham New Street	Watford Junction (1tph), Rugby (1tph), Coventry, Birmingham International; Trains call alternately at Watford Junction and Rugby. Peak time services run to/from Wolverhampton. Two daily services run to/from Shrewsbury which are operated by Super Voyagers.	Pendolino & Super Voyager	2tph
C	London Euston – Chester, Bangor, Holyhead and Wrexham General	Milton Keynes Central, Crewe; Certain trains are extended beyond Chester to/from Bangor or Holyhead. 1 train on Monday-Friday is extended to/from Wrexham General. 1 train on Monday-Friday runs between Bangor/Holyhead and Birmingham New Street.	Super Voyager	1tph
D	London Euston – Liverpool Lime Street	Stafford, Crewe, Runcorn.	Pendolino	1tph
E	London Euston – Manchester Piccadilly	Milton Keynes Central (1tph), (Stoke-on-Trent, Macclesfield (1tph) / Crewe, Wilmslow), Stockport; 2tph run via Stoke-on-Trent and 1tph runs via Crewe. Trains via Stoke-on-Trent call alternately at Milton Keynes Central and Macclesfield. Off-peak trains via Crewe do not call at Milton Keynes Central.	Pendolino	3tph
F	London Euston – Glasgow Central	Warrington Bank Quay, Wigan North Western, Preston, Lancaster, Oxenholme Lake District (1tp2h), Penrith (1tp2h), Carlisle. Trains call alternately at Oxenholme Lake District and Penrith. One daily weekday service operates to/from Blackpool North which is operated by a Super Voyager or Pendolino.	Pendolino	1tph

== 1997 franchise ==
The initial franchise was contested by Sea Containers, Stagecoach and Virgin Rail Group. Each submitted two bids, one based on an all tilting train fleet, and another based on a combination of conventional and tilting trains. On 19 February 1997, the Director of Passenger Rail Franchising awarded a 15-year franchise to Virgin Rail Group, with Virgin Trains commencing operations on 9 March 1997.

In order for tilting trains to be operated, Railtrack was committed to upgrade the West Coast Main Line to allow 140 mph operation by 2005. In the wake of the collapse of Railtrack and the inability of its successor Network Rail to deliver the upgrade, the franchise was suspended in favour of a management contract in July 2002. After projected costs greatly increased from £2.5 billion to £10 billion, there were cutbacks to the upgrade and the top speed was reduced to 125 mph.

== 2012 franchise process ==
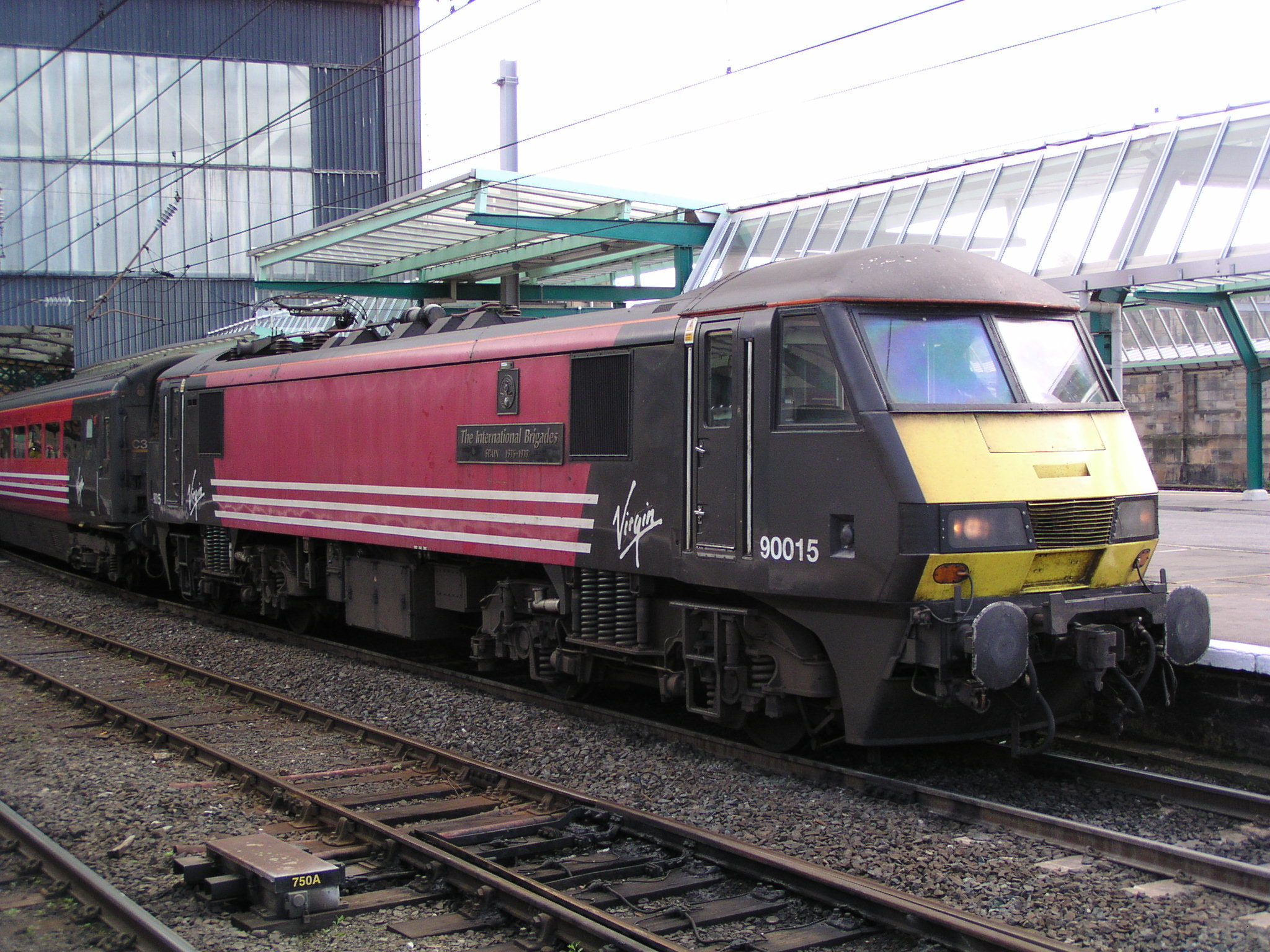
Virgin Trains Class 90 at Carlisle station in August 2004

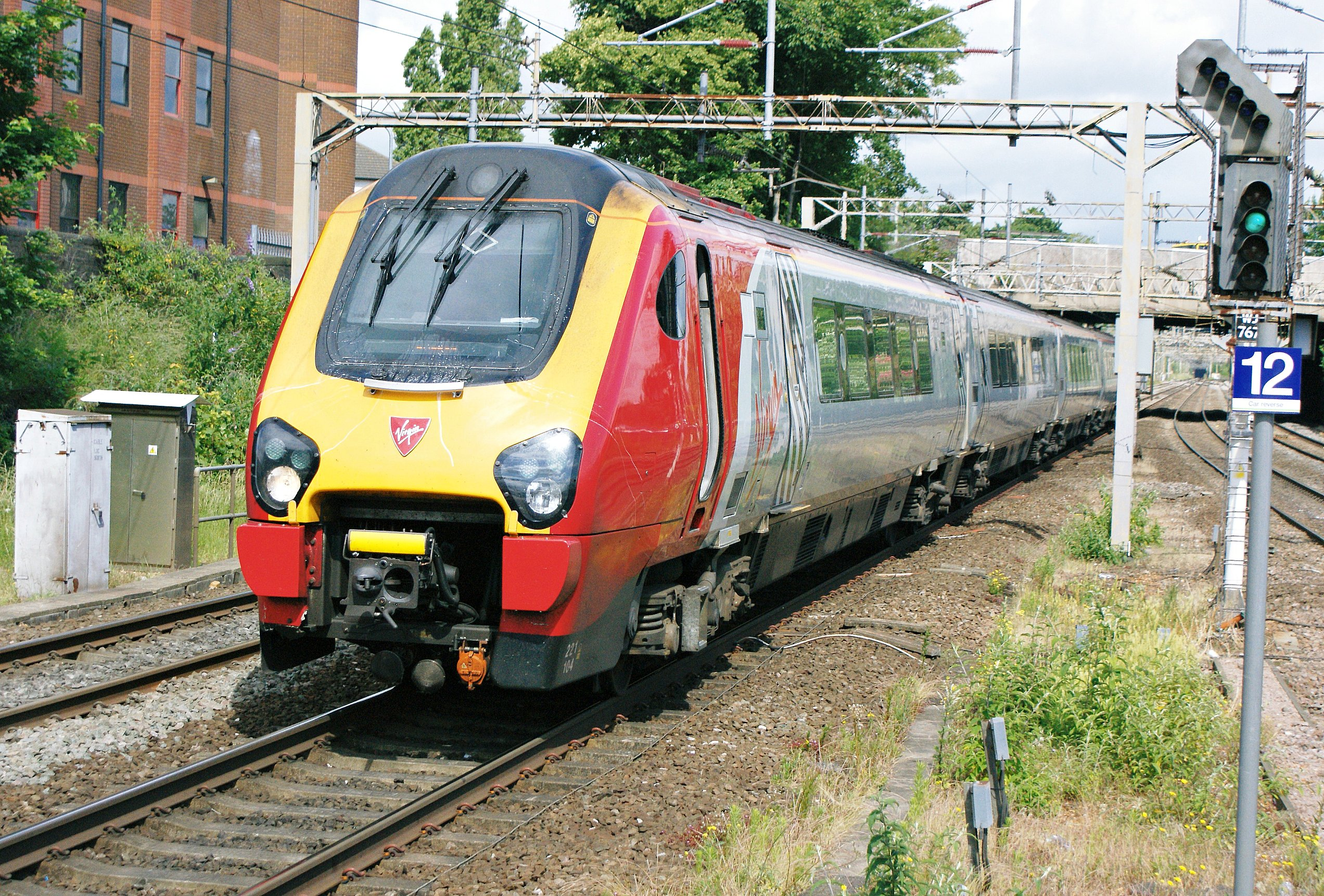
Virgin Trains Class 221 Voyager at Watford Junction station in June 2008

During 2011 and 2012 the Department for Transport (DfT) conducted a franchise competition, announced a winner, then cancelled the competition and refunded the costs of bids before any contracts were signed.

=== Bidding competition ===
With the franchise awarded in 1997 scheduled to end on 31 March 2012, the DfT started the refranchising process in January 2011 by inviting expressions of interest in the Official Journal of the European Union for a 14-year franchise to run from 1 April 2012 to March 2026. The award of the franchise was stated to be based on the "most economically advantageous tender in terms of the criteria as stated in the specifications". The franchise was the first to be offered under a new scheme rather than the previous "Cap and Collar" system, which provided for risk-sharing with government regarding future demand. The new scheme was intended to provide greater incentives for cost reduction by operators. Because of the increased future risks carried by operators under the new scheme, the government required a large financial surety to discourage early contract default.

In March 2011, the DfT shortlisted Abellio, FirstGroup, Keolis/SNCF and Virgin Rail Group to bid for the franchise, which would run for up to 15 years. In May 2011, a Draft Invitation to Tender was issued to the shortlisted bidders, which stated the franchise start date had been postponed until 9 December 2012. In October 2011, the DfT announced that Virgin had been granted a franchise extension until 8 December 2012, and in January 2012 issued the Final Invitation to Tender to the shortlisted bidders. On 15 August 2012, the DfT announced FirstGroup as the successful bidder for the franchise, promising 11 new six-carriage electric trains, direct services to Blackpool in 2013, and to Telford, Shrewsbury and Bolton in 2016.

=== Challenge ===
On 10 August 2012 a report commissioned by Virgin Rail Group, detailing concerns with the franchising evaluation process, was handed to the DfT.

An e-petition was created to urge the government to reconsider its decision and to debate the bids in the House of Commons. The petition was set up independently, but backed by Virgin, and attracted large support, gaining 50,000 signatures within two days. The 100,000 signatures required for the petition to be considered for debate in Parliament was exceeded. The matter was debated in Westminster Hall on 17 September 2012.

Following the public's response to Virgin's loss of the franchise, Louise Ellman, Chair of the Transport Select Committee, wrote to the then Secretary of State for Transport, Justine Greening, asking her to delay the signing of the new contract until the committee had a chance to explore the matter. Virgin had offered to run the line on a 'not for profit' basis while this took place. Despite public and political pressure for an independent review of the deal, the DfT declared it would not delay the signing of the contract once the ten-day standstill period had expired. On 28 August, Virgin Trains announced it would seek a judicial review of the franchise decision, preventing the contract being signed, claiming civil servants had "got their maths wrong with FirstGroup". The DfT responded, stating that they were confident the selection process was robust. In September 2012, the DfT began making arrangements for the franchise to pass temporarily to West Coast Main Line Limited, a subsidiary of Directly Operated Railways, in the event that a judicial review was granted.

=== Cancellation ===
On 3 October 2012, the government announced it was cancelling the franchise competition after discovering significant technical flaws in the bidding process, thus cancelling the decision to award it to FirstGroup. It was stated that civil servants had made significant mistakes in the way in which the risks for each bid had been calculated, leading to too little default surety being required of bidders.

Two independent inquiries were announced; one to investigate the failed competition, led by Sam Laidlaw of Centrica, with Ed Smith, both on the Board of the DfT; and the second led by Richard Brown of Eurostar, to investigate the wider franchise system. Three civil servants were suspended.

During September 2012 the newly appointed Secretary of State for Transport, Patrick McLoughlin, had been warned of potential issues. On 2 October, he decided to cancel the franchise award. The DfT had been due in the High Court on 3 October 2012 to respond to a judicial review sought by Virgin Rail Group.

On 5 October 2012, one of the three suspended civil servants, Kate Mingay, released a statement to correct the reporting of her role in the franchising process. She began legal proceedings against the DfT over her suspension, with a High Court hearing on 29 November 2012 rejecting her claim to have her suspension lifted. It was announced on 6 December 2012 that all three of the suspended civil servants, including Mingay, would return to work.

The government decided it would reimburse the four bidders for all costs incurred. This amounted to £39.7 million with a further £4.9 million paid to FirstGroup as reimbursement for mobilisation costs incurred.

The Laidlaw report was published in December 2012, and found the DfT to be primarily responsible for the failure of the West Coast competition, having made several errors in its financial modelling. The Brown report, published in January 2013, found no fundamental flaws in the bidding process but made recommendations for improvements.

== Direct awards ==
In October 2012, the DfT announced that Virgin Trains would continue to operate the franchise for between 9 and 13 months until a short-term interim franchise competition for the West Coast could be rerun. In December 2012, Virgin was awarded a 23-month management contract until November 2014.

In March 2013 the Secretary of State for Transport announced negotiations with Virgin to extend the franchise until 31 March 2017; these were concluded in June 2014. In 2016 the franchise was again extended and in 2018 there was a further extension to March 2019, with an option for up to an additional year. This option was taken up by the DfT in December 2018, thereby extending the contract for a period potentially up to March 2020.

== West Coast Partnership ==
In November 2016, the government announced that the InterCity West Coast franchise would be replaced by the West Coast Partnership. Avanti West Coast commenced operating the franchise on 9 December 2019.
