= Crewe Carriage Sidings =

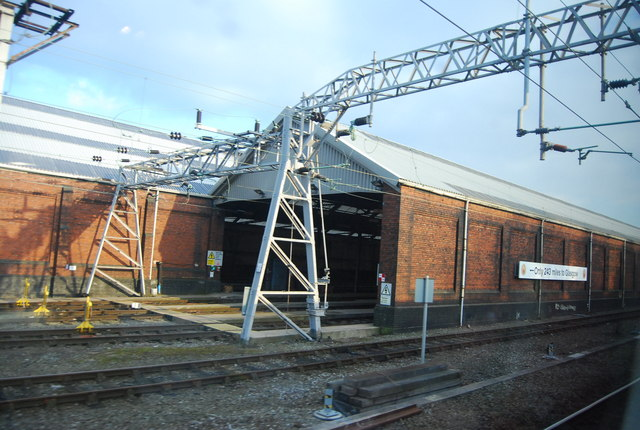
- Crewe Carriage Shed seen from the West Coast Main Line in 2013
- Interactive map of Crewe Carriage Sidings

Location
- Location: Crewe, Cheshire
- Coordinates: 53.0811°N 2.4276°W
- OS grid: SJ714538

Characteristics
- Owner: Network Rail
- Operator: Arriva TrainCare
- Depot code: CP (1973-)
- Type: DMU, EMU, Diesel

Crewe Carriage Sidings (alternatively Crewe Carriage Depot, and also as Crewe L&NWR) is a stabling point located in Crewe, Cheshire, England, on the eastern side of the West Coast Main Line, between that line and the line to Alsager, to the south of Crewe station.

== History ==
The main carriage shed was opened by the London & North Western Railway prior to 1910, as a seven-track through-road shed. By the 1960s, this shed was used by British Rail for stabling multiple units. The three-track bay, closest to the West Coast Main Line, was refurbished after 1996. The second building is a three plus one-track through-road shed, built in 1999.

== Present ==
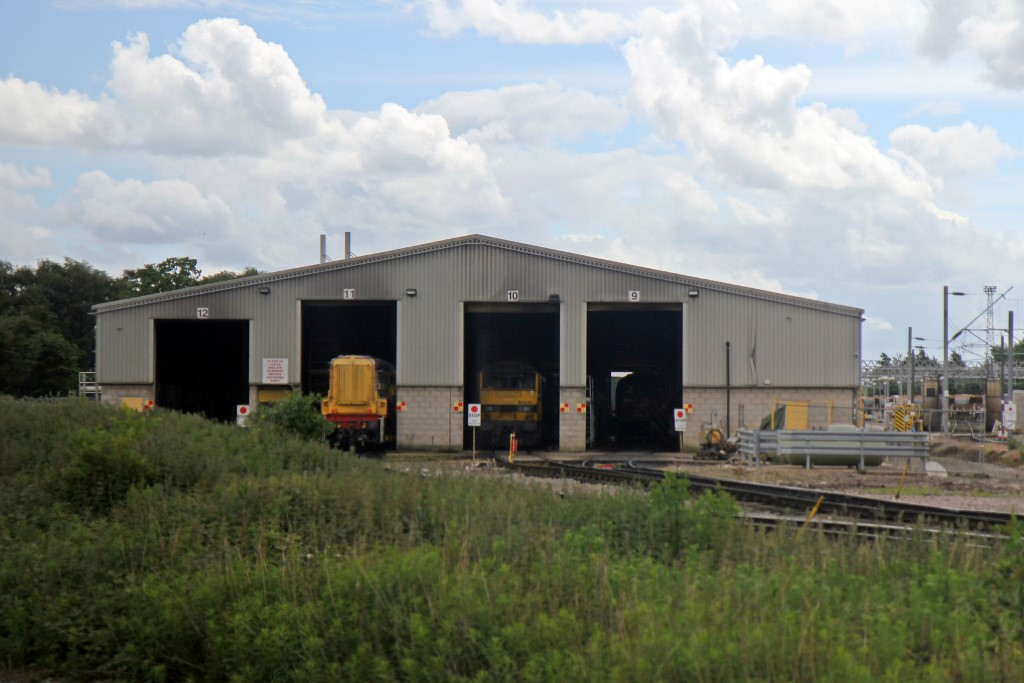
The second shed, seen from the Crewe-Derby line in 2014

It provides stabling for Transport for Wales Rail Class 67, Mark 4 carriages, Driving Van Trailers, Class 150, and Class 158s and West Midlands Trains Class 350s. It has been occupied by Arriva TrainCare and its predecessors, LNWR and Waterman Railways, since 1996.
