= West Coast Partnership =

UK railway franchise

Overview
- Locale: West Coast Main Line
- Dates of operation: 2019–2026

Other
- Website: www.westcoastpartnership.co.uk

The West Coast Partnership (WCP) is a railway franchise in the United Kingdom for passenger trains on the West Coast Main Line (WCML) (and branches thereof), between London Euston, the West Midlands, Shropshire, North Wales, Liverpool, Manchester, Carlisle, Edinburgh and Glasgow. Founded in December 2019, it is operated by First Trenitalia West Coast Rail Limited, comprising two distinct parts, Avanti West Coast (which runs the services on the WCML), and West Coast Partnership Development (which is the 'future operator' for high-speed services).

== History ==
In November 2016, the Department for Transport (DfT) announced that the InterCity West Coast franchise would be replaced by the West Coast Partnership, which would operate express services on both the West Coast Main Line (WCML) and on High Speed 2 (HS2).

At that time, high-speed services were planned to begin on the first phase of HS2 in 2026. The new franchise was originally to start in September 2019, and to operate an initial seven years of WCML services to 2026, followed by five years as the integrated operator for WCML and HS2 (to 2031) – with an option for the Secretary of State to extend the term by up to three years (to 2034).

The DfT specified that the new operator must have experience in high-speed trains and infrastructure, hence each bidder partnered with an Asian or European high-speed operator. In June 2017, the DfT announced three consortiums had been shortlisted to bid for the franchise:

- FirstGroup (70%) / Trenitalia (30%)
- MTR Corporation (75%) / Guangshen Railway Company (25%)
- Stagecoach (50%) / SNCF (30%) / Virgin Group (20%)

In December 2018, MTR announced that Spain's main rail operator Renfe Operadora had joined its joint bid as a key subcontractor. In April 2019, Stagecoach Group was disqualified for submitting a non-compliant bid.

In August 2019, the DfT announced the FirstGroup / Trenitalia consortium as the successful bidder. Trading as Avanti West Coast and West Coast Partnership Development, it commenced operating the franchise on 8 December 2019.

As a result of the COVID pandemic, the franchising system in Great Britain was abolished in the autumn of 2020. The Franchise Agreement was initially replaced by an Emergency Measures Agreement (EMA) between 1 March 2020 and 20 September 2020, and subsequently by an Emergency Recovery Measures Agreement (ERMA), in effect until 1 April 2031. Poor performance in 2022 led to a new six-month short term contract being imposed by the DfT. In March 2023, this was extended for a further six months to 15 October 2023.

On 19 September 2023, DfT announced the award of a National Rail Contract (NRC) to First Trenitalia, starting on 15 October 2023, with a core term of three years (to 18 October 2026) and a maximum term of nine years (to 17 October 2032). The Starmer government has announced that all DfT contracted operators will be nationalised by October 2027 and that Avanti West Coast will be one of the last two.
