= Electric Traction Limited =

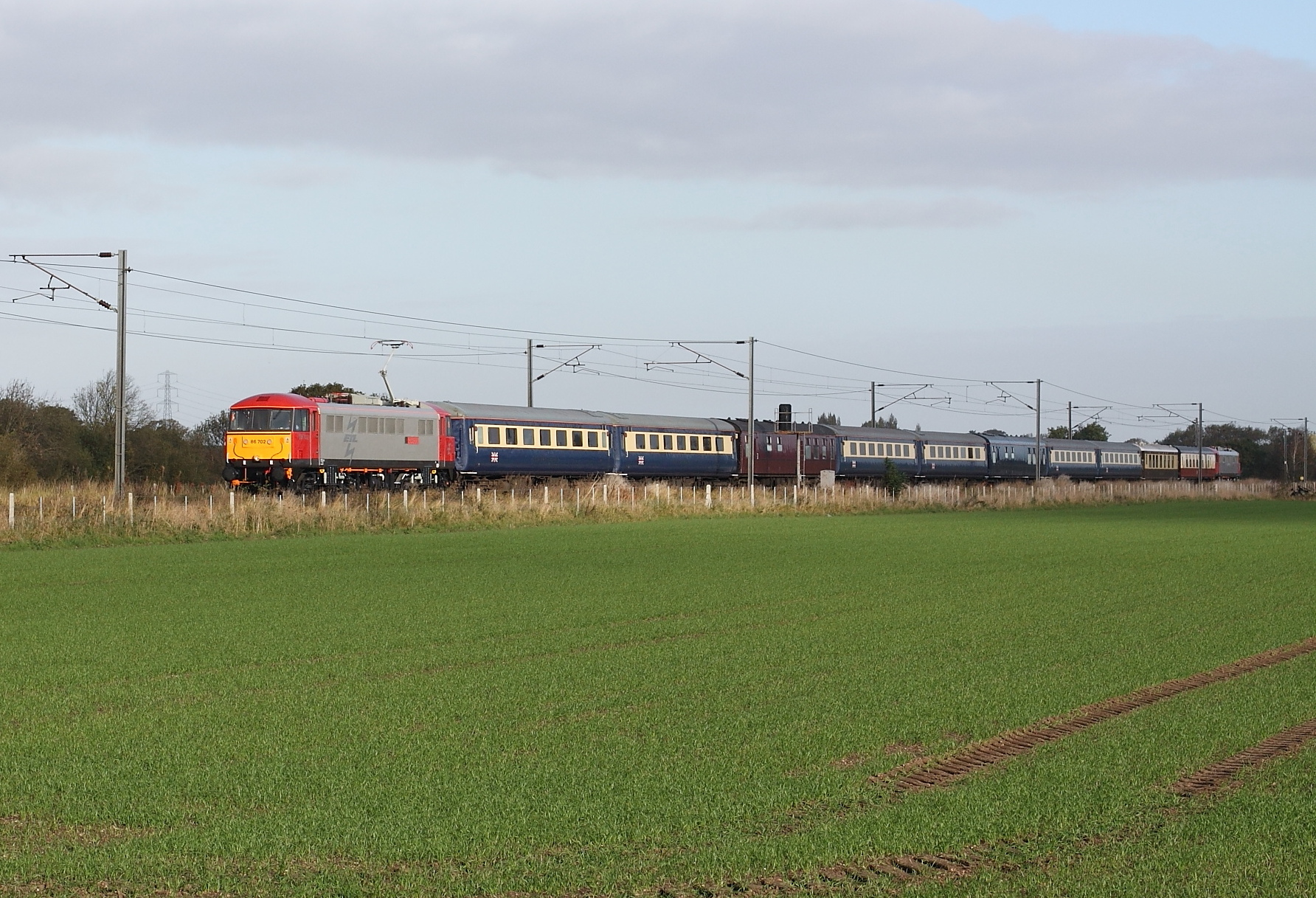
86702 on the East Coast Main Line in October 2009

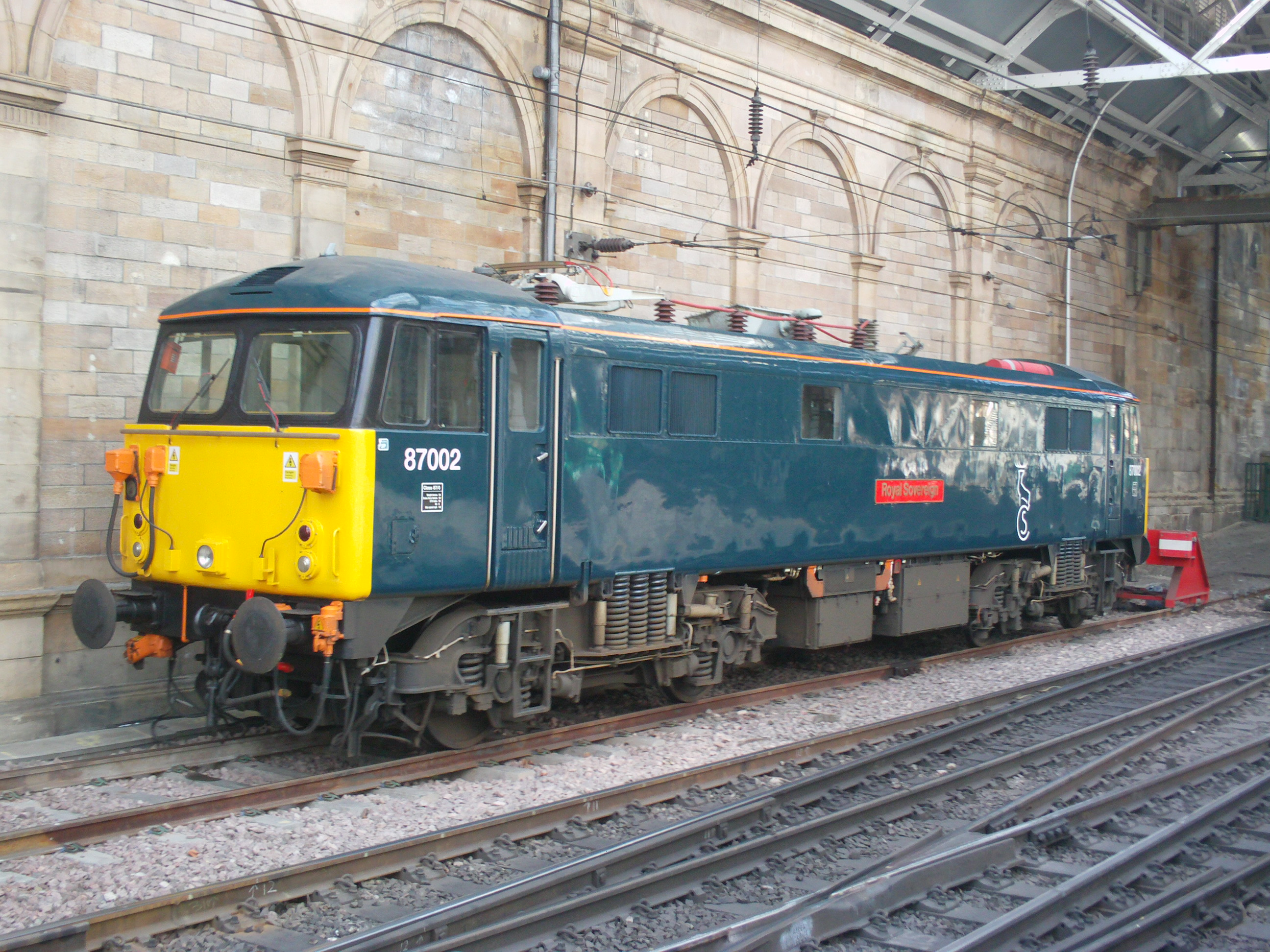
87002 in Caledonian Sleeper livery at Edinburgh Waverley in May 2015

Electric Traction Limited was a British electric locomotive hire company. It operated some former British Rail Class 86 and 87 electric locomotives hired from associated company Europhoenix and the AC Locomotive Group from 2010 until 2019.

== Previous operations ==
ETL's first major operation began in 2010 when newly refurbished Class 86/7s, 86701 and 86702, entered traffic on 15 October 2010. Two days later the pair hauled their first revenue-earning train, a private charter for First GBRf from Newcastle to London King's Cross on 17 October. They later went on to work in Winter 2009/2010 on Royal Mail standby services and had several operations as the Network Rail's standby icebreaker locomotives.

By January 2013 there were seven locomotives in the fleet. In 2016, 86213, 86701 and 86702 were sold for further service in Bulgaria.

== Caledonian Sleeper ==
When Serco, with GB Railfreight contracted to provide traction, took over the Caledonian Sleeper in April 2015, issues arose with the Class 92 locomotives. Electric Traction Limited was contracted to supply 86101, 86401 and 87002, primarily to assist with stock and shunting moves but also to haul services from London Euston to Edinburgh and Glasgow on occasions. These were hired from the AC Locomotive Group. This enabled these locomotives to remain mainline certified and available for occasional charters. With the end of this work in May 2019, the locomotives were returned to the AC Locomotive Group and subsequently sold.
