= Europhoenix =

English railway locomotive company

Europhoenix Rail (EPR)
- Class 37 in 2026
- Founded: June 2008
- Headquarters: Milton Keynes, United Kingdom
- Area served: Europe
- Services: Railway locomotive hirer
- Owner: DBI Holdings

Europhoenix Rail (EPR) is a freight operator and spot-hire railway locomotive company in England. In addition to the hiring out of locomotives to various other operators across the United Kingdom, it commonly exports former British Rail rolling stock to operators in mainland Europe.

The company was founded in 2008 with the project of overhauling stored Class 87 electric locomotives prior to their export to the Bulgarian Railway Company. Further customers would be found by Europhoenix for its refurbished Class 87s and Class 86s in both Bulgaria and Hungary; several Class 56 diesel freight locomotives were also exported in a similar manner. It also provides aftersales technical support for these types to their overseas operators.

Throughout the 2010s, Europhoenix purchased a number of Class 37 diesel locomotives, overhauling these and putting them to work for spot-hiring; additional examples were acquired in response to demand from customers such as the Rail Operations Group. The company is reportedly investigating hybrid technology and cleaner engine designs for its fleet. In October 2019, Europhoenix announced plans to refurbish and export up to 20 Class 91 electric locomotives to Eastern Europe for heavy freight operations.

In July 2026, the business was acquired in July 2026 by DBI Holdings, an aggregates firm.

== History ==
The origins of Europhoenix can be traced to its founder, Glenn Edwards, and Electric Traction Limited, which the company formerly traded as prior to being rebranded. Early operations were centered around the overhauling of 17 stored Class 87 electric locomotives formerly owned by the British railway leasing company Porterbrook in preparation for their sale to the Bulgarian Railway Company. Europhoenix established a workshop at Long Marston to perform repair and reactivation work on the type.

Following the fulfilment of the Bulgarian Railway Company contract, there were still Class 87s in long term storage at Long Marston with no set purpose; Europhoenix set about seeking customers for some of those locomotives, while those beyond economic repair were gradually scrapped. During 2012, the company sold four of these Class 87s to the private Bulgarian railway operator Bulmarket. That same year, Europhoenix sold three Class 56s before they were sent to Hungary for use by Floyd Zrt.

During September 2008, Europhoenix purchased 23 Class 86 electric locomotive that had been stored by the rail leasing company HSBC Rail. These underwent an extensive refurbishment programme at Long Marston by Europhoenix's engineering team. Between 2009 and 2013, eight were overhauled and sold to the Hungarian open-access operator Floyd Zrt. During May 2016, a further six Class 86s were sold to Bulmarket, which included a pair of locomotives that had been previously operated in the UK by Electric Traction Limited. These Bulgarian-destined Class 86s were subject to further alterations upon arrival.

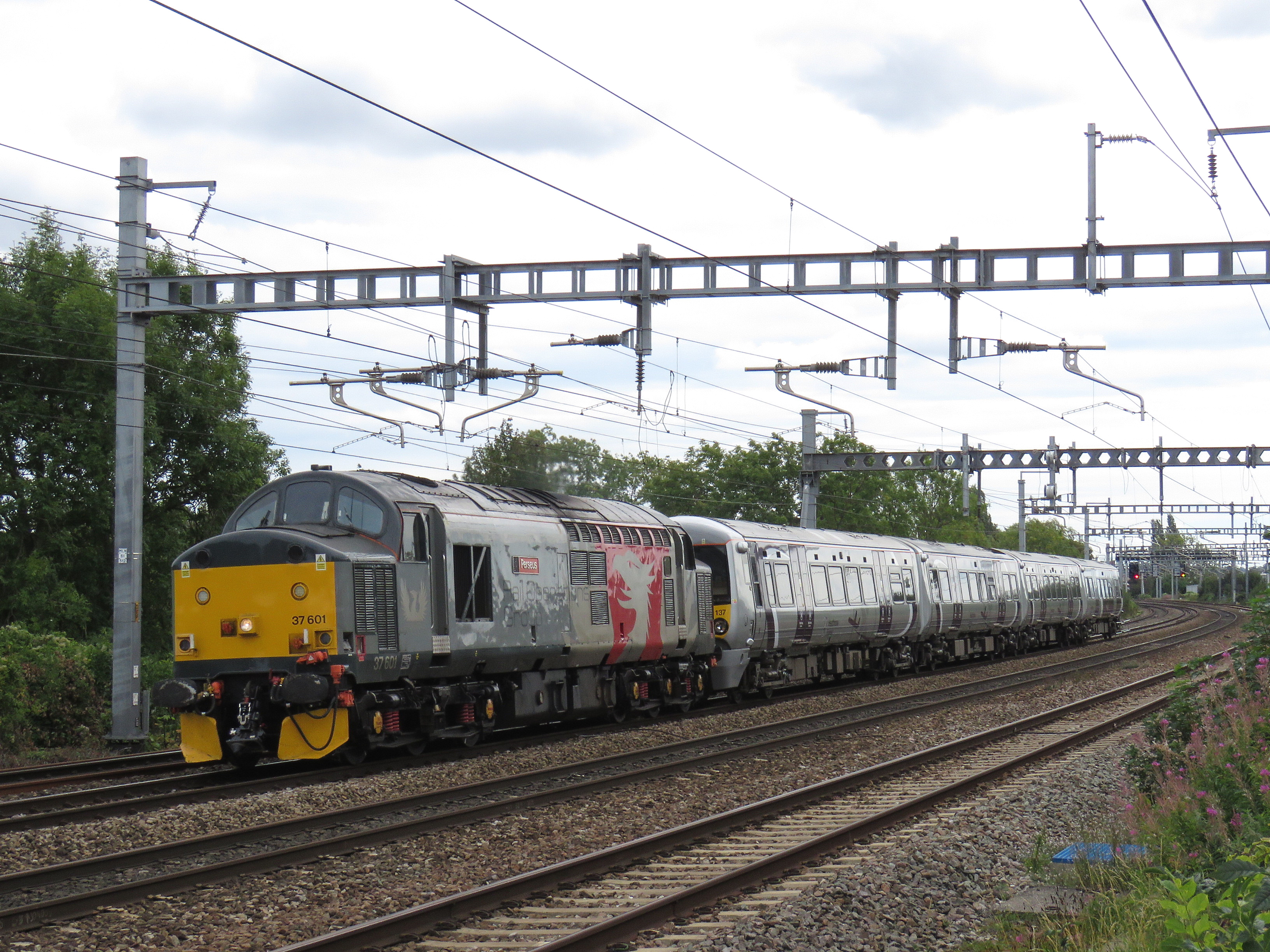
A Class 37 hauling rolling stock

In the early 2010s, Floyd approached Europhoenix with a proposal for them to refurbish a pair of Class 56 diesel freight locomotives; three (56096, 16115, and 56117) were promptly acquired from the freight operator DB Schenker, while another (56101) was obtained from the preservation sector. Three of these would be exported to Hungary, although only two Class 56s would see optional service, the third locomotive apparently being used as a source of spare parts. The fourth Class 56 was briefly used by Europhoenix itself, before being sold to the freight operator Colas Rail. Beyond the initial procurement, Europhoenix has continued to provide technical support and advice to both its Bulgarian and Hungarian export customers.

During 2013, Europhoenix purchased three Class 37 diesel locomotives, comprising 37800 and 37884 from DB Schenker and preserved 37906 from the Ruston 906 Group. The former two were returned to service during 2015 and 2016 after their overhaul by the Harry Needle Railroad Company and UK Rail Leasing, they were leased to the Rail Operations Group. During 2016, a further five Class 37s (37503, 37510, 37608, 37611 and 37670) were purchased from the freight operator Direct Rail Services. Originally, Europhoenix had intended to market its Class 37s for the spot-hire market; however, it was found that there was enough interest in the type to keep the locomotives busy on a near-permanent basis. Accordingly, by 2018, the whole fleet had been subject to a full rebuild.

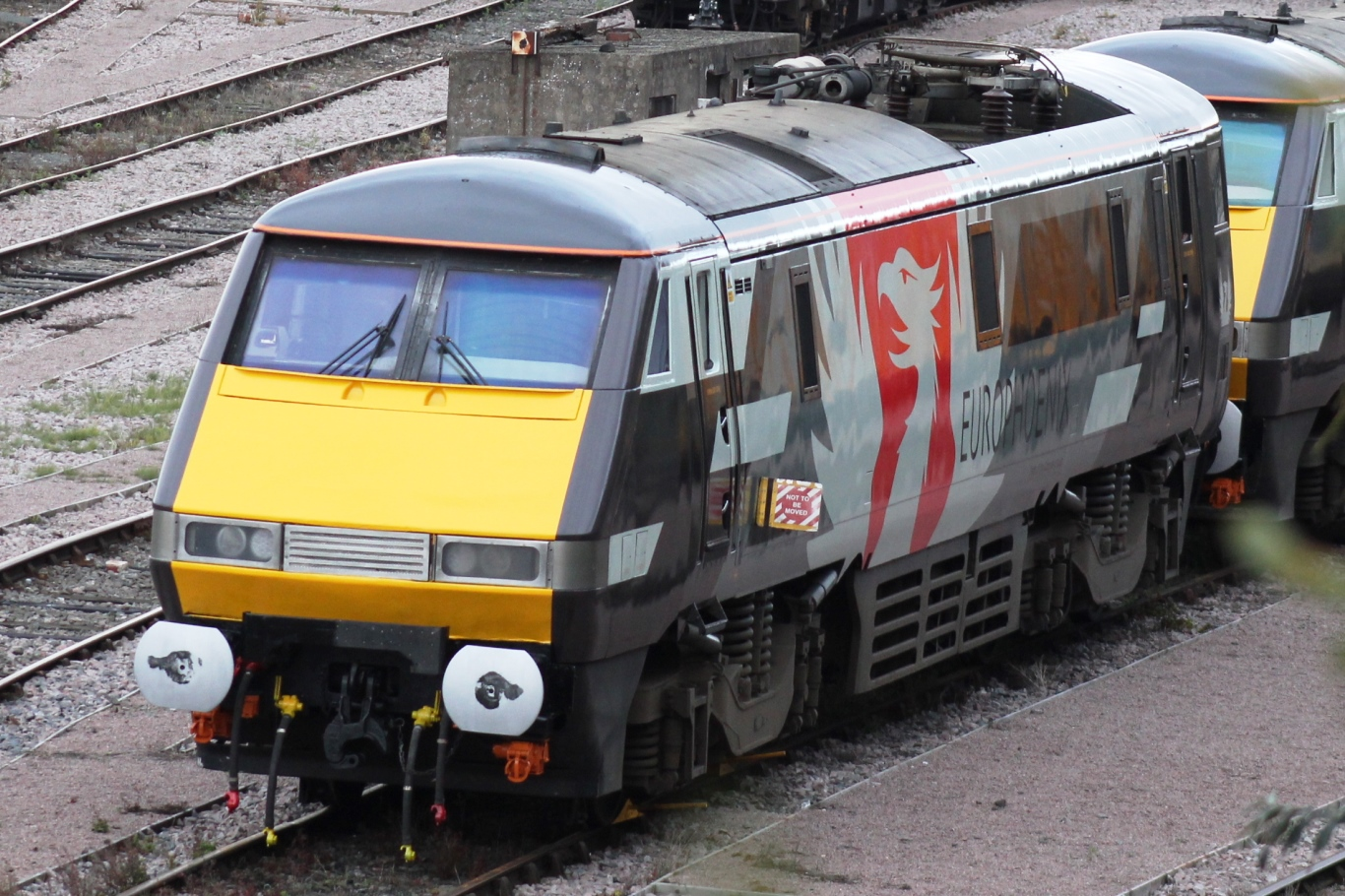
A Class 91 painted in fleet livery ready for export

By the late 2010s, the company was reportedly investigating hybrid technology and cleaner engine designs with the purpose of improving the future operational prospects of its fleet. According to Edwards, Europhoenix is routinely evaluating other locomotive designs for their export potential as well for pursuing spot-hire work in Britain. Typically, acquisition opportunities have been anticipated from other train operating customers withdrawing rail vehicles in favour of new rolling stock.

In October 2019, Europhoenix announced plans to export up to 20 Class 91 electric locomotives to Eastern Europe for heavy freight operations following their withdrawal from express passenger services on the East Coast Main Line. It had already acquired two Class 91s for initial trials abroad; it was expected that the company would, in partnership with the German manufacturer Voith, re-gear them to a lower rating to improve their heavy haulage characteristics as well as to permanently connect them together into pairs at the blunt ends. Plans to export the type to Bulgaria were underway at one stage, but these were reportedly disrupted by the COVID-19 pandemic; by February 2022, Europhoenix was still seeking opportunities on continental Europe for its Class 91s, having concluded that there was little work available in the British railway market for the type.

== Livery ==
Europhoenix adopted a grey, silver and red livery with a phoenix motif.
