= Eurogate Rail Hungary =

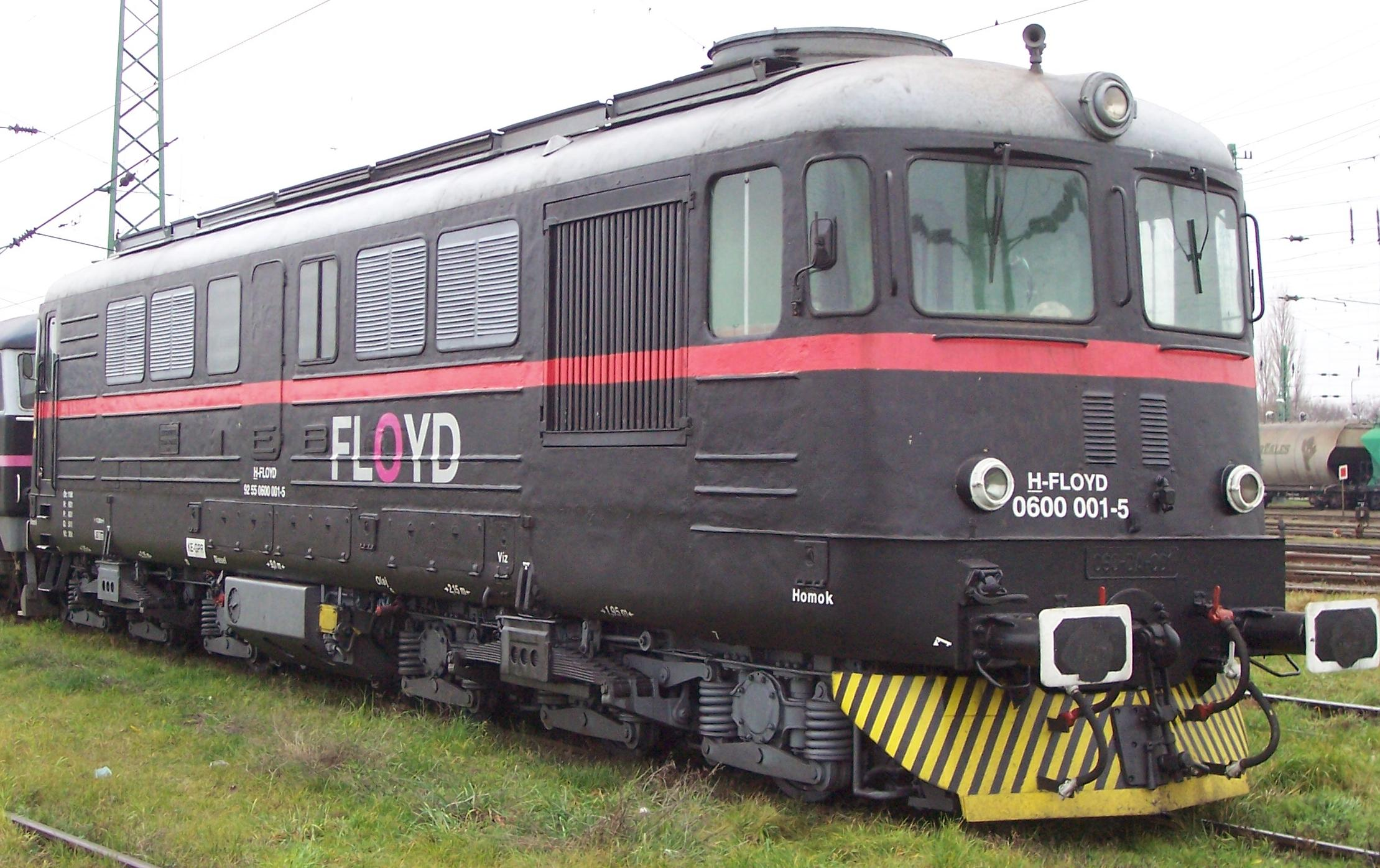
- Floyd Zrt 060 DA Diesel locomotive
- Formerly: Floyd Zrt
- Industry: Rail freight
- Founded: 2004
- Headquarters: Budapest, Hungary
- Services: Freight train operator
- Parent: Eurogate International
- Website: eurogate-rail.hu/

Eurogate Rail Hungary, formerly Floyd Zrt, is a Hungarian private railway company founded in 2004 by Andras Bogdan. Its headquarters are in Budapest. Rolling stock is usually black with the name of the company written on a pink stripe. The vehicles were therefore given the nickname Pink Floyd.

The company mainly deals with the transit and transport of goods, with daily services to the Budapest Intermodal Logistics Center and Hamburg. In October 2008, Eurogate purchased a 51% shareholding and ICE Transport another 23%, with Andras Bogdan retaining 26%. In January 2022, Floyd Zrt was renamed Eurogate Rail Hungary.

== Fleet details ==
=== Current ===
- Siemens Vectron 193D – 6 units leased from BoxXpress.de
- Bombardier TRAXX F140 AC2 – 1 unit leased from Akiem
- LDE CFR 2100 – 429 series, three locomotives
  - 429 004

=== Past ===
- British Rail Class 86 – 450 series, nine locomotives
  - 450001 (ex 86248), 450002 (ex 86250), 450003 (ex 86232), 450004 (ex 86218), 450005 (ex 86215), 450006 (ex 86217), 450007 (ex 86228), 450008 (ex 86242), 450 009 (ex 86424)
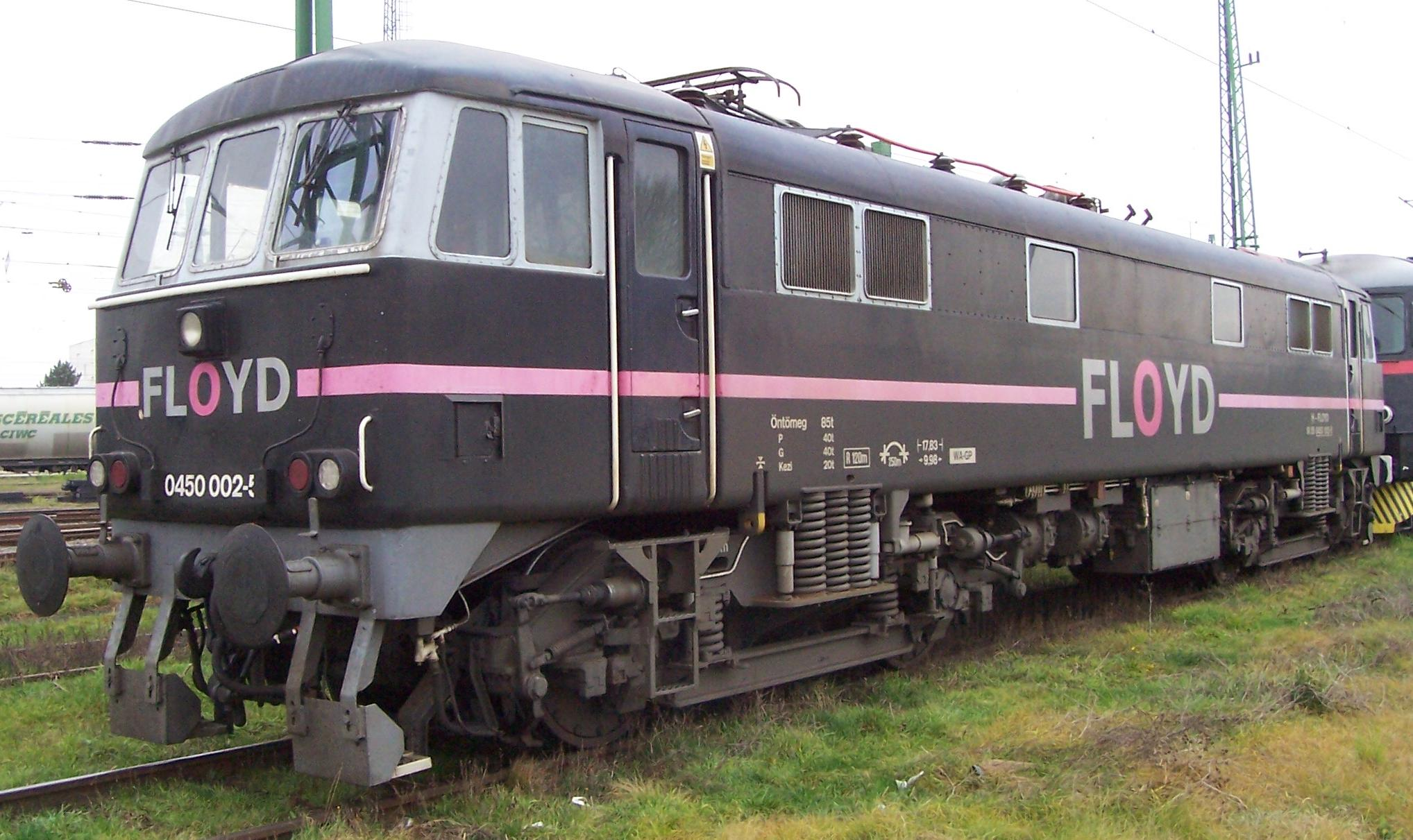
    Class 450 locomotive 450002 in Hegyeshalom in November 2010
- British Rail Class 56 – 659 series, three locomotives
  - 659001 (ex 56101), 659002 (ex 56115), 659003 (ex 56117)
- 60 CFR Series – 609 series, one locomotive
  - 609 009
- CFR LDH 1250 – 429 series, one locomotive
- LDE CFR 1250 – 492 series, one locomotive
