= British Rail Class 86 =

British class of electric locomotives

British Railways AL6, British Rail Class 86
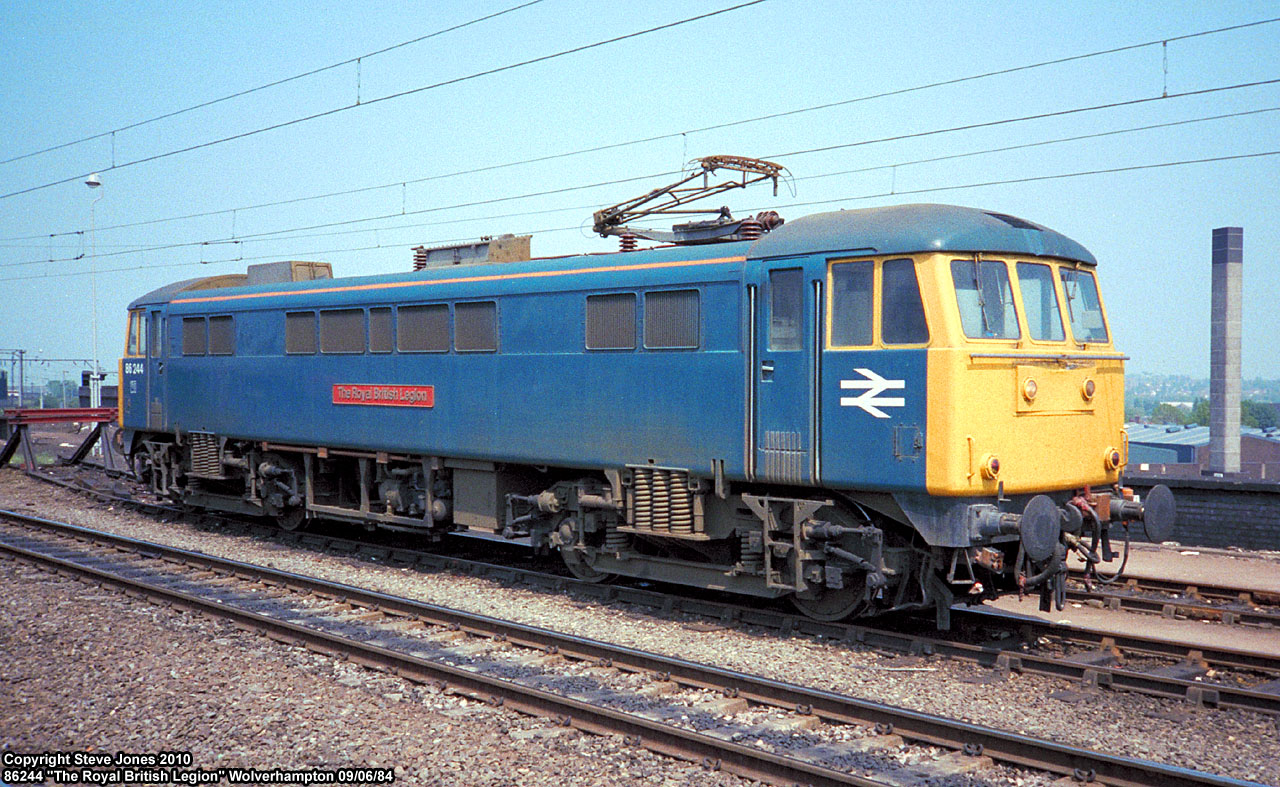
- 86244 The Royal British Legion at Wolverhampton (1984)
Type and origin
- Power type: Electric
- Builder: British Rail Doncaster Works (E3101-E3140), English Electric at Vulcan Foundry (E3141-E3200)
- Order number: E020 (E3101–E3110), E024 (E3111–E3120), E025 (E3121–E3130), E026 (E3131–E3140), E382–E401 (E3141–E3160), E299–E338 (E3161–E3200)
- Build date: 1965–1966
- Total produced: 100
Specifications
- Configuration
  - AAR: B-B
  - UIC: Bo′Bo′
  - Commonwealth: Bo-Bo
- Gauge: 4 ft 8 1/2 in (1,435 mm) standard gauge
- Bogies: Alsthom suspension
- Wheel diameter: 3 ft 9 in (1.143 m)
- Minimum curve: 6 chains (400 ft; 120 m)
- Wheelbase: 43 ft 6 in (13.26 m)
  - Bogie: 10 ft 9 in (3.28 m)
- Pivot centres: 32 ft 9 in (9.98 m)
- Length
  - Over body: 54 ft 8 in (16.66 m)
  - Over buffers: 58 ft 6 in (17.83 m)
- Width: 8 ft 8 1/4 in (2.648 m)
- Height
  - Pantograph: 13 ft 0 9/16 in (3.977 m)
  - Body height: 12 ft 4 1/4 in (3.766 m)
- Axle load: 21 long tons 8 cwt (21.7 t)
- Loco weight: 81 long tons (82 t; 91 short tons)
- Electric system/s: 25 kV AC Catenary
- Current pickups: Stone-Faiveley pantograph, Brecknell Willis high speed pantograph
- Traction motors: 4 × AEI 282AZ 900 hp (671 kW), 4 × AEI 282BZ 1,000 hp (746 kW), 4 × GEC G412AZ 1,250 hp (932 kW)
- Gear ratio: 22:65
- MU working: Some fitted within class and Class 87, later fitted with TDM system.
- Train heating: Electric Train Heating (Index 66)
- Train brakes: Westinghouse, dual vacuum & air
Performance figures
- Maximum speed: 100–110 mph (161–177 km/h)
- Power output: 3,600 hp (2,685 kW), 4,040 hp (3,013 kW), or 5,000 hp (3,728 kW)
- Tractive effort: 60,000 lbf (267 kN)
- Brakeforce: 66.5 long tons-force (663 kN)
Career
- Operators: British Rail, Anglia Railways, Europhoenix, Freightliner, Bulmarket Bulgaria, EWS, Floyd Zrt Hungary, One, Network Rail, Virgin CrossCountry, Virgin Trains
- Class: 86
- Number in class: 100
- Numbers: E3101–E3200; later 86001–86048, 86201–86252
- Axle load class: Route availability 6
- Locale: West Coast Main Line
- Withdrawn: 1986 (2); 1995–2021
- Preserved: 86101, 86259, 86401
- Disposition: 3 preserved, 31 exported, 1 scrapped in Bulgaria, 65 scrapped in the UK

The British Rail Class 86 is a type of electric locomotives built during the mid-1960s. Developed as a standard electric locomotive from earlier prototype models, one hundred were built during 1965–66 to haul trains on the then newly-electrified West Coast Main Line (WCML) from London Euston to Birmingham, Crewe, Liverpool, Manchester, and later Preston and Glasgow. Introduction of the class enabled the replacement of many steam locomotives, which were finally withdrawn by British Rail (BR) in 1968.

Under the earlier BR classification system, the type was given the designation AL6 (Note: Meaning the sixth design of AC locomotive.) and locomotives were numbered E3101–E3200. In 1968, this was changed to Class 86 when BR introduced the TOPS classification system.

The class was built to haul passenger and freight trains alike on the WCML; however, some members of the class also saw use on the Great Eastern Main Line (GEML) between London Liverpool Street and Norwich, after the remainder of the line north of Colchester was electrified in the mid-1980s. The type has had a generally long and successful career, with some members of the class seeing main line service lives in Great Britain of up to 55 years. Most regular passenger duties of the class came to end on both the WCML and the GEML in the early-to-mid-2000s, after a career of up to 40 years. Some members of the class remained in use for charter work and for freight work with Freightliner until 2021. A number of the class were exported to Bulgaria and Hungary and remain in use. As of 2022, three Class 86s remain preserved in operational condition in Great Britain; all are in private ownership.

== Development and construction ==
The class was developed as a result of experience with the earlier prototype classes 81, 82, 83, 84 and 85; these had been produced by different manufacturers in the early days of the WCML electrification, as test-beds for locomotive development.

The AL6 featured design elements pioneered on the earlier classes, such as the general construction of the bodies and bogies, and control systems. However, some design features were unique, such as the squarer front ends (as opposed to the raked back noses of the earlier designs), the lack of a second pantograph and the cooling fans, which were redesigned to produce less noise than the earlier locomotives. A major departure from the designs of the earlier prototype locomotives came in the use of axle-hung, rather than frame mounted traction motors; this feature would later prove very problematic for the class.

The order for 100 locomotives was placed in 1963; it was split between two manufacturers, with the English Electric Vulcan Foundry in Newton-le-Willows building 60 locomotives and BR's Doncaster Works producing 40. The two locomotive builds were not identical; the Newton-built versions had a power output of 3,600 hp (2,685 kW), whilst the Doncaster-built locomotives were rated at 4,000 hp (2,983 kW), due to a different design of traction motor.

== British Rail service ==
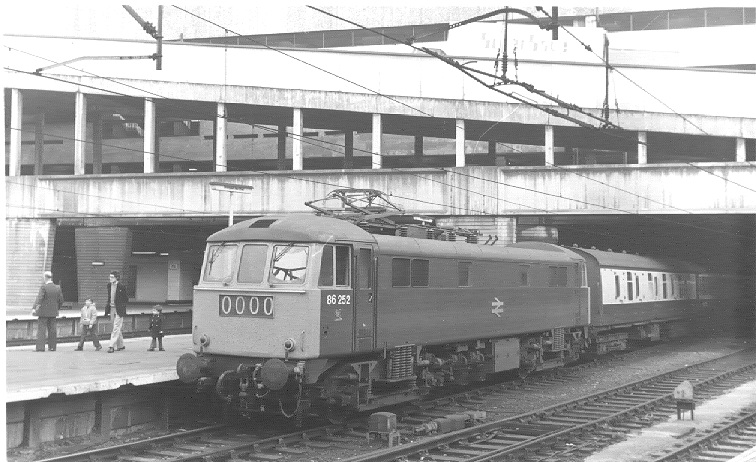
Class 86/2, no. 86252, at Birmingham New Street with a cross-armed AEI pantograph during the BR blue era. This locomotive was originally numbered E3101, the class pioneer.

The class was introduced officially into service in August 1965; the entire fleet was delivered within 24 months of that date. In the early years, the locomotives became notorious for rough riding and causing track damage, being fitted with axle-hung traction motors in place of the bogie-frame-mounted motors of the earlier designs; this additional unsprung mass was causing damage at speeds in excess of 90 mph (145 km/h). In 1969, E3173 was fitted experimentally with the large helical flexicoil springs. Trials carried out under the direction of the British Rail Research Division proved successful and the modification was applied gradually in phases to the whole fleet.

As a result, the first batch of Class 86s were modified with improved suspension and, from 1971 onwards, locomotives were renumbered progressively into two subclasses: 86/0 (numbers 86001–86048), which remained in as-built condition, and had their maximum speed reduced from 100 mph (161 km/h) to 80 mph (129 km/h) and which were generally restricted to use on freight and slower passenger services; and subclass 86/2 (86204–86252), which were fitted with the improved suspension and retained the 100 mph maximum speed. Within a short time, a further batch was modified to the new specification and renumbered accordingly; 86040–86048 became 86253–86261.

In 1970, E3173 was also fitted experimentally with a streamlined nose cone made from fibreglass; this was to assist BR's research into aerodynamics and high-speed running for their new Advanced Passenger Train and High Speed Train, which were under development. The locomotive was tested on the WCML in the Tring area; it reportedly reached speeds of 129 mph (208 km/h), which made it the first BR locomotive to beat Mallard's speed record. The record was not publicised however, as BR did not want the event to overshadow their new trains.

At the same time, three Class 86s were converted into 5,000 brake horsepower (3,728 kW) test-bed locomotives for development of the Class 87; they were numbered initially to 86201–86203, refitted with BP9 bogies but were renumbered quickly to a new 86/1 subclass: 86101–86103. These locomotives were capable of 110 mph (177 km/h) running. The most obvious visual difference between the classes is that the Class 86 has a windscreen with three windows, whereas the Class 87 only has two; likewise, the Class 86 was fitted with headcode boxes (later plated over) while the Class 87 was built without them.

By the late-1970s, there was a need for more locomotives capable of operating at 100 mph. To achieve this, nineteen 86/0s were modified by the use of SAB resilient wheels, a new design of wheel in two sections separated by a rubber bearing, which allowed their top speed to be raised. The converted locomotives (86011–029) were renumbered into the 86/3 series (86311–329). As the SAB wheels were found to be insufficient for preventing track damage, BR decided to refit all of their remaining 86/0 and 86/3 locomotives with flexicoil suspension in 1984; by the mid-1980s, all of the modified 86/0s and 86/3s were renumbered again as 86/4s, allowing a standardised fleet capable of 100 mph running.

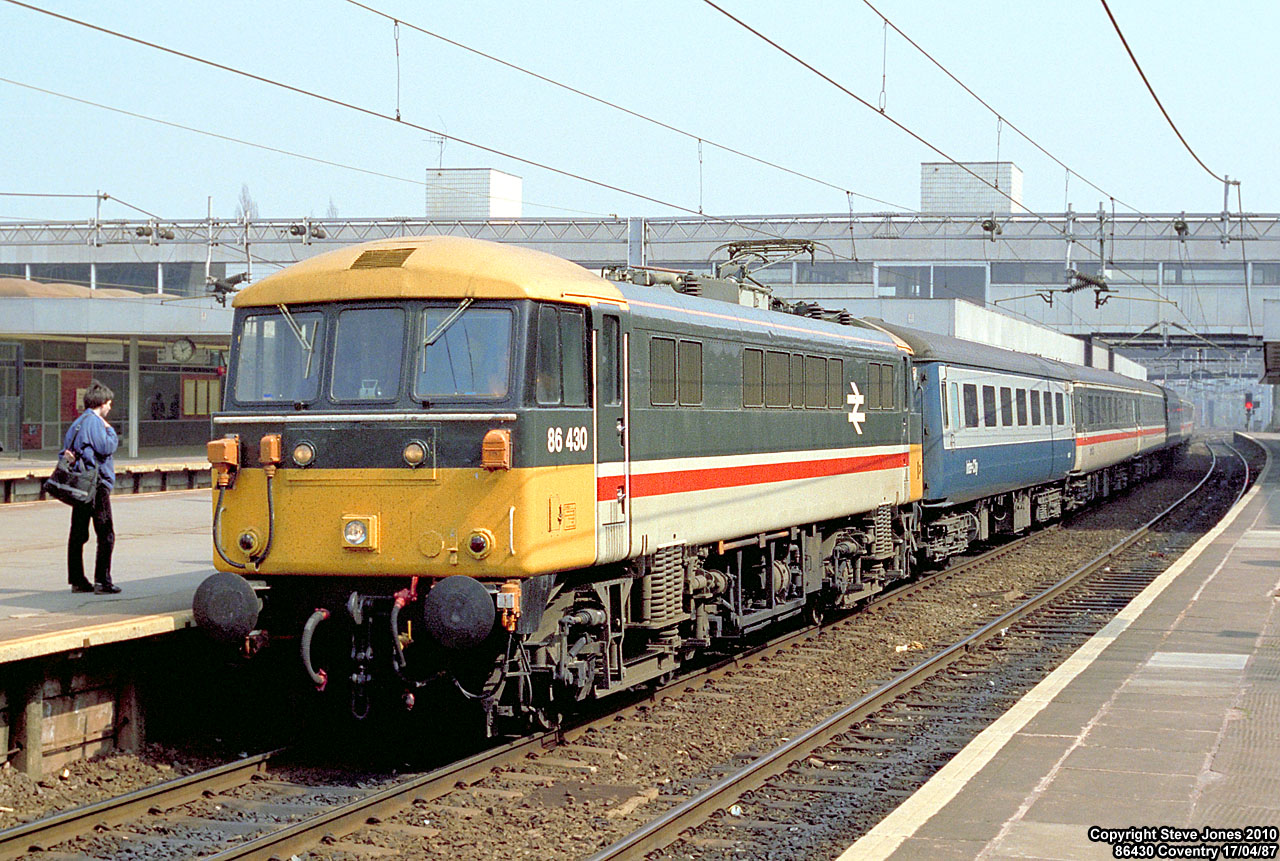
86430 at Coventry in InterCity livery (1987)

Further electrification of the GEML in the 1980s beyond Colchester to Harwich Town, (Note: Although the line was electrified through to Harwich Town station, Class 86s hauled boat trains only as far as Harwich International.) Ipswich and Norwich saw the class employed on passenger trains from London Liverpool Street to these locations; Ipswich was energised in 1985 and Norwich in 1987. Class 86s would operate inter-city passenger services to Norwich and boat trains to Harwich International until 2005, when they were replaced fully by Class 90s. In addition, many of the freightliner trains to the Port of Felixstowe were also hauled as far as Ipswich by Class 86 locomotives working in multiple. The West Anglia Main Line from Liverpool Street to Cambridge was also electrified at the same time and Class 86s hauled services on this route from 1987 until 1989.

A later development saw Class 86/2 and 86/4 locomotives fitted with time-division multiplexing (TDM) to enable them to operate push-pull passenger trains. The main benefit of this was the requirement for fewer locomotives; for example, a second locomotive would otherwise have to join at the other end of the train after arrival at terminal stations to lead the train's onward journey. A class of 52 Driving Van Trailers was manufactured and introduced to the WCML in 1988 to enable push-pull trains; Driving Brake Standard Opens (DBSO) were transferred later from Scotland to the GEML to work with their Class 86/2s. The 86/4s were already fitted with an older multiple-working system and this was gradually phased out after TDM was fitted across the fleet.

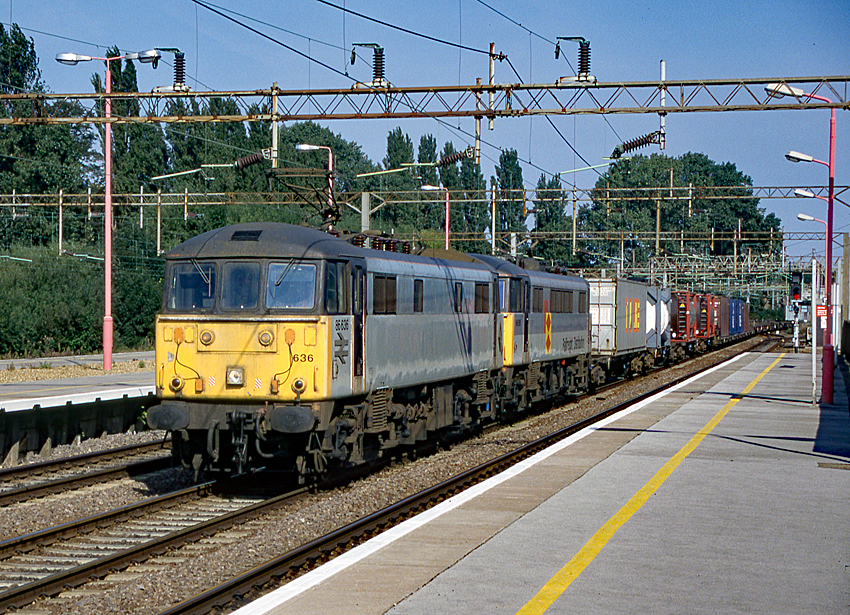
Two Class 86/6s on a container train at Northampton (1996)

Sectorisation of British Rail in the late 1980s saw the fleet split up again; the 86/2s were dedicated to the InterCity sector for use on express passenger trains, whilst the majority of the 86/4 subclass were dedicated to freight and parcels traffic. As a result, many had their electric train heating isolated and were regeared to a lower maximum speed of 75 mph (121 km/h); these were usually operated in pairs on long-distance freight services; these locomotives were reclassified as a new subclass 86/6. Eight Class 86/2 locomotives were also dedicated to freight work and were reclassified as Class 86/5, being renumbered into the range 86501–86508. However, the InterCity sector decided that it wanted these locomotives back, so they were soon renumbered back to Class 86/2s. For a period of one year, starting on 10 May 1992, six Class 86/6s (Note: Numbers 86405/411/414/415/428/431.) were returned to parcels use, which were renumbered back to Class 86/4 and retained their Railfreight Triple Grey livery.

The late 1980s also saw the introduction of many new liveries. The class had previously worn rail blue when built with cast lion-and-wheel emblems, but this was replaced by the standard BR Blue livery from 1967 with a cast-metal double arrow symbol. The first new livery was introduced by the InterCity sector in 1984 with the unveiling of an InterCity Executive livery, with dark grey upper body, tan lower body separated by red and white stripes, with wrap around yellow cab sides and roofs.

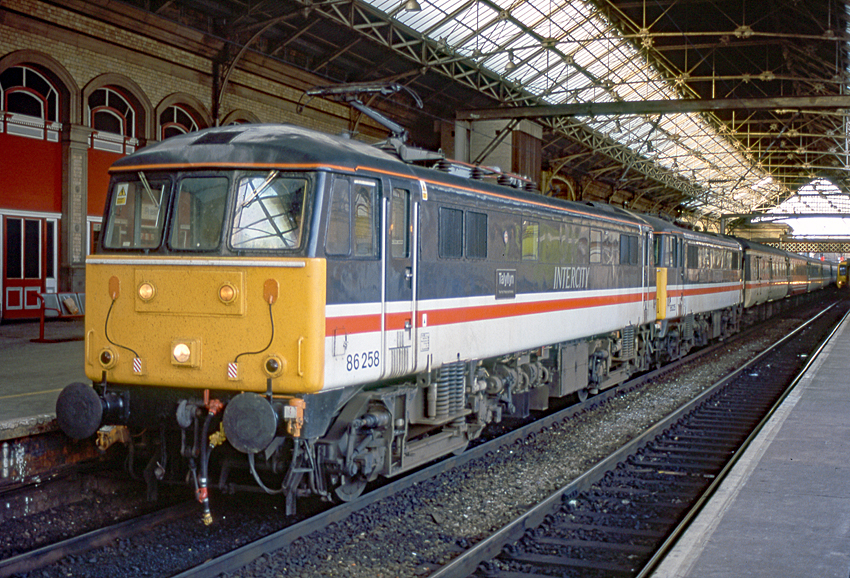
A pair of Class 86/2s in InterCity Swallow livery at Preston (1998)

A rebranding of InterCity's Swallow livery was undertaken in 1987 on InterCity 125s, Class 90s and Class 91s, which were in the final stages of construction. Class 86/4s were still used on a mixed traffic basis on InterCity express trains, parcels, Speedlink and Freightliner traffic, so a modernised version of InterCity livery was used, commonly known as Mainline livery. The red and white stripes and tan bands covered the whole bodyside, and the roof was dark grey. The whole of the ends were painted yellow, although some were repainted dark grey around the front windows. The first Class 86 received InterCity Swallow livery in 1990, when a full sector ownership was established.

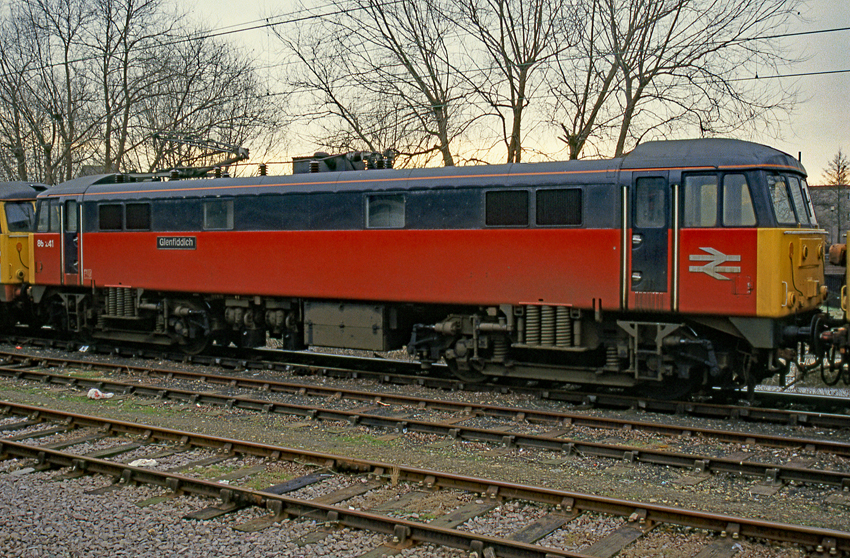
86241 Glenfiddich, in parcels sector livery, at Northampton (1992)

The Railfreight sector introduced its new two-tone grey livery in 1987, initially without sub-sector logos due to shared operations on Speedlink and Freightliner duties. Four Class 86s received Railfreight General logos from June 1988, but all Class 86/6 locomotives carried Railfreight Distribution livery beginning in January 1990. Finally, the parcels sector introduced a new red and grey livery, with repaints from July 1990 to July 1991; it was replaced with Rail Express Systems livery, applied between December 1991 to February 1995.

== Former operators ==
In the mid-1990s, BR was privatised and the Class 86 fleet was divided among several operators:

=== Anglia Railways/One ===
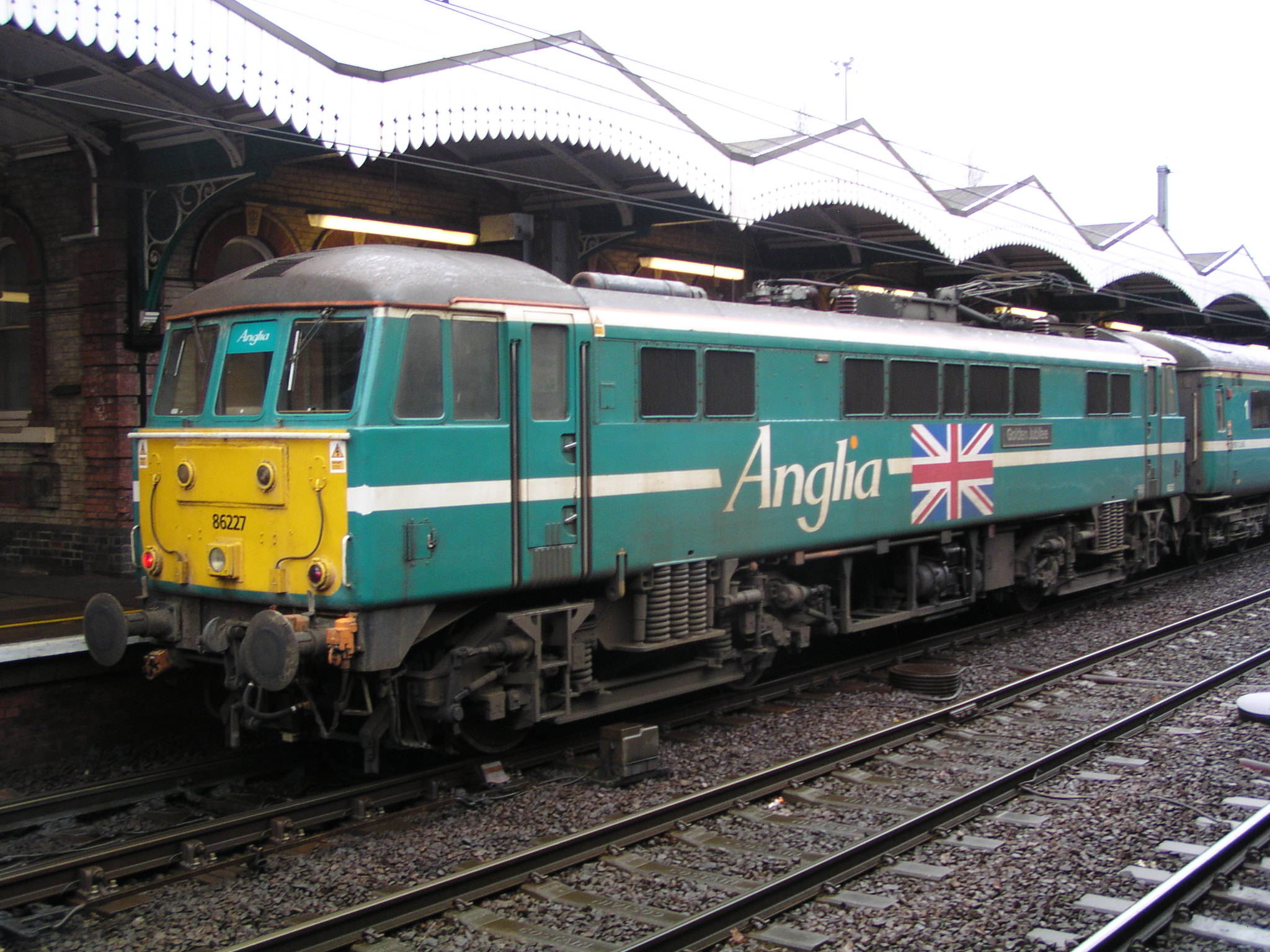
Class 86/2, no. 86227 Golden Jubilee at Ipswich, painted in a special livery to celebrate the Golden Jubilee of Elizabeth II (2002)

Anglia Railways was one of three passenger franchises to inherit the class. A fleet of 15 locomotives (Note: Numbers 86215/217/218/220/221/223/230/ 232/235/237/238/246/250/252/257) were inherited, which were used to exclusively haul London Liverpool Street-Norwich inter-city services. The locomotives were used in push-pull mode, with Mk 2E and Mk 2F coaching stock and a DBSO, which removed the need for the locomotive to swap ends at the termini. Generally, the locomotive was at the south (London) end of a formation, with the DBSO at the north (country) end of the train; this was to aid simple switchover of locomotives close to their home depot, Norwich Crown Point.

In 1998, Anglia Railways introduced a new livery of turquoise, with a central white stripe. The first locomotive to be treated was no. 86223 Norwich Union, followed quickly by no. 86218 NHS 50. Over the next few years, the whole fleet was treated as they received works overhauls at Springburn Works, in Glasgow.

Over the years, several of the Anglia fleet were withdrawn following mishaps. Nos. 86220, 86221 and 86237 were withdrawn in 2002, 2003 and 2004 respectively, following transformer failures; no. 86252 was written off in 2002 after catching fire near Colchester on 1 December 2001; and no. 86257 was withdrawn in 2003 due to its general poor condition. These locomotives were replaced by locomotives made redundant from Virgin CrossCountry (nos. 86234/242) or West Coast (nos. 86209/260) franchises. Another locomotive, no. 86227, was reinstated to traffic in 2002 after being stored for many years. It was repainted in a variation of Anglia's livery, with a large Union Flag painted on the side and named Golden Jubilee to commemorate Elizabeth II's 50th anniversary of her reign.

The first major changes to the fleet occurred in late 2002, when Anglia started to hire Class 90 locomotives from Freightliner; this was because the Class 86 fleet was suffering from reliability problems at the time. In late 2003, Anglia swapped to using English Welsh & Scottish-owned Class 90 locomotives, hiring up to five at any one time. Consequently, the use of the Class 86 fleet was decreased, which subsequently allowed reliability to improve.

In early 2004, two locomotives suffered from serious transformer failures. One, no. 86246, was subsequently repaired, but the other, no. 86237, was withdrawn and later scrapped. This prompted the suggestion that the Anglia Class 86 fleet be replaced by the 15 Class 90 locomotives from Virgin Trains, which were soon to be made redundant by the introduction of new Class 390 Pendolino electric multiple units (EMUs).

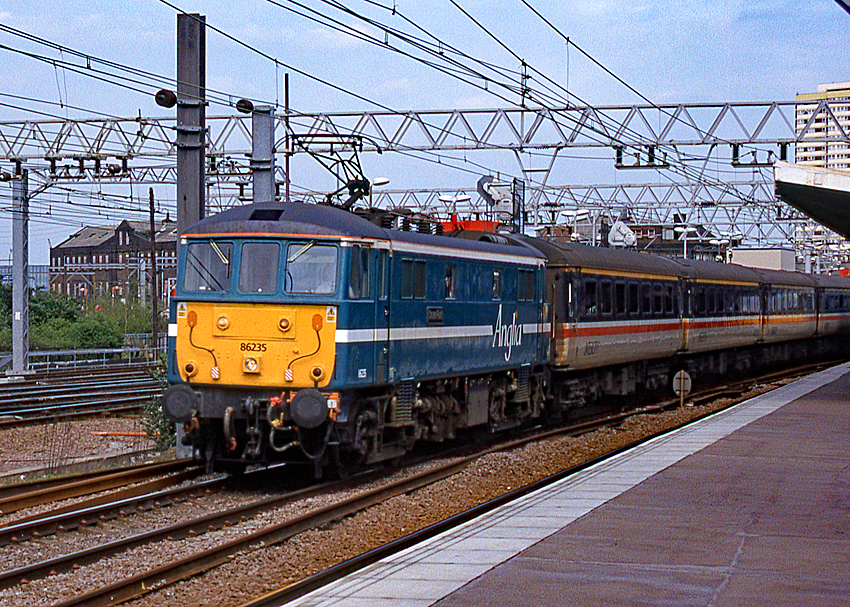
86235 Crown Point passing Stratford with an up express

On 1 April 2004, the Anglia Railways franchise ended and the franchise was merged with the other operators in East Anglia to form the new Greater Anglia franchise operated by One. With this came the news that the Class 86 fleet would progressively be replaced by Class 90 locomotives, cascaded from Virgin Trains. The first day of the new franchise saw two Class 90 locomotives unveiled in the new franchisee's One livery. However, despite this announcement, one Class 86 locomotive, no. 86235, was authorised a complete overhaul; this became the last locomotive to receive classified repairs.

For the first few months of the new franchise, all of the Class 86 fleet was retained, to insure against reliability issues with the new Class 90 locomotives. However, in October 2004, the fleet was reduced to just six examples; (Note: Numbers 86218/232/234/235/246/260) the rest were withdrawn, but three (Note: Numbers 86217/223/250.) were sold subsequently to Fragonset Railways. By December, the fleet stood at just two operational locomotives, these being nos. 86235 Crown Point and 86246 Royal Anglian Regiment.

It was originally planned to withdraw these final two locomotives on 31 December 2004; however, all did not go to plan, as the replacement Class 90 locomotives did not prove to be as reliable as hoped. Therefore, two locomotives were reprieved until at least March 2005. A final twist saw no. 86232 repaired, replacing no. 86246, which had again suffered from a serious failure. A third locomotive, no. 86234, was also repaired and briefly returned to traffic in April 2005, but was later stored again after failing. The last two locomotives (nos. 86232/235) saw occasional use when insufficient Class 90 locomotives were available. By mid-2005, no. 86232 was out of use and no. 86235 was operational but not used. The final use of the class came on 17 September 2005, when no. 86235 was used on several Norwich-London return trips to mark its retirement from service. This brought an end to 40 years of Class 86-hauled passenger trains.

=== Colas Rail ===
86701 joined the Colas Rail fleet and was painted into their yellow and orange livery in October 2012; this, however, was short lived, as it was withdrawn from main line use in January 2013. In 2015, it was used for contractual work at Ilford Depot. In March 2016, it was transferred to Europhoenix, where it was subsequently exported to Bulgaria for further use.

=== Caledonian Sleeper ===
On 31 March 2015, the new Caledonian Sleeper contract started, following takeover of the contract from DB Schenker. In February 2015, 86101 was repainted into the new Caledonian Blue livery. From 31 March 2015, 86101 was used to convey the empty sleeper coaching stock between London Euston and Wembley Intercity Depot, as well as between Glasgow Central and Polmadie TRSMD, along with 87002. After a lengthy refurbishment, 86401 joined the Caledonian Sleeper fleet on 8 August 2015. In October 2019, the Class 86s were withdrawn, primarily due to coupler incompatibility, and were returned to the AC Locomotive Group.

=== English, Welsh & Scottish Railway ===
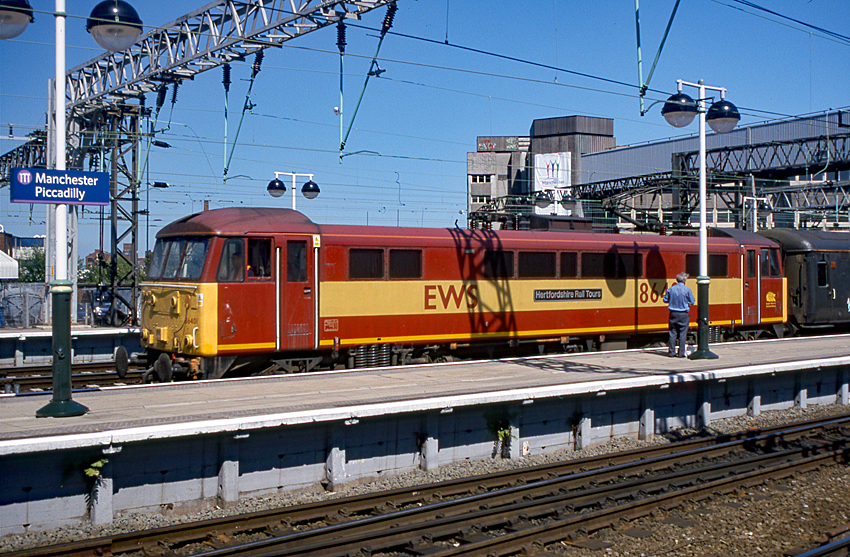
86401 at Manchester Piccadilly on charter to Virgin Trains

English Welsh & Scottish inherited a small fleet of 15 locomotives (Note: Nos. 86208/210/239/241/243/254/261, 86401/416/417/419/424-426/430) when it bought the Rail Express Systems parcels business. The locomotives were employed on mail trains from London King's Cross to Newcastle, and Birmingham New Street to Glasgow Central.

EWS soon diversified the use of its fleet, hiring its locomotives to charter train operators and also to Virgin Trains, to supplement their unreliable fleet. Three locomotives (Note: Numbers 86261/401/426) were repainted into EWS's red and gold livery.

The rundown of the fleet started in 2001, when the locomotives were replaced on charter and mail trains by Class 67 or Class 90 locomotives. They saw continued use with Virgin Trains, however, but were gradually withdrawn as new Class 390 Pendolino units entered service, reducing the need for hired locomotives. By the end of their working careers, most of the EWS locomotives were in a poor state and suffered from numerous failures. The final locomotives, nos. 86210/401/424, were withdrawn from traffic in late 2002.

Following withdrawal from traffic, two locomotives (nos. 86426/430) were subsequently reinstated and hired to Freightliner, on a long-term contract. This was due to a Class 90 locomotive, no. 90150, being written off due to fire damage, resulting in a shortage of electric traction. The two locomotives were repainted into Freightliner's racing green livery and employed on intermodal traffic, with the rest of Freightliner's Class 86 fleet. The contract ended in mid-2004, following deliveries of new Class 66 diesel locomotives, meaning that the two electric locomotives were surplus to requirements and they were withdrawn from traffic.

In late 2003, with the exception of the two locomotives on hire to Freightliner, EWS advertised all of its remaining locomotives for sale. Most were subsequently sold for scrap, but one locomotive (no. 86401) was preserved, whilst two others (nos. 86210/424) were sold for further use with Network Rail; 86210 was reclassified Class 86/9, along with 86253. The former Freightliner pair were sold to C F Booth in late-2005.

=== FM Rail ===
FM Rail (previously Fragonset Railways) briefly leased several locomotives from HSBC Rail. These locomotives were previously used by Anglia Railways (86217/223/250), Virgin Cross-Country (86231/251) and Virgin West Coast (86229/233). One locomotive, ex-Virgin 86212, was hauled to East Ham depot in east London to be used for carriage power duties for the new Blue Pullman train. However, it did not operate services on the main line.

FM Rail entered administration in December 2006, without having returned any of their Class 86 locomotives to traffic and they were returned to the lease company.

=== Freightliner ===
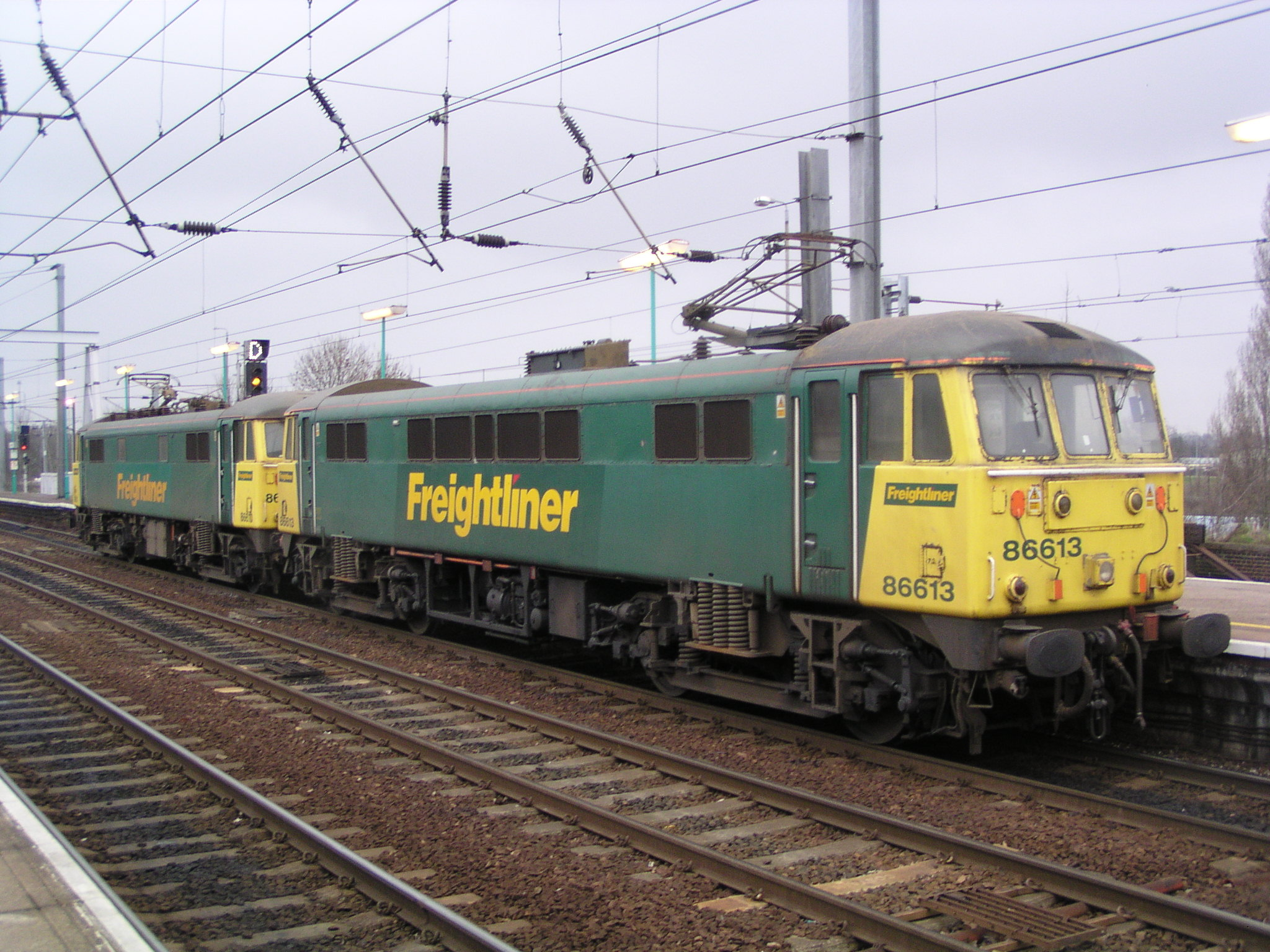
86613 and 86610 at Ipswich (2004)

Freightliner inherited a large fleet of thirty Class 86/6 freight-dedicated locomotives, most of which had previously been operated by Railfreight Distribution, but some came from Rail Express Systems. The fleet therefore consisted of locomotives in many different obsolete liveries so, from 1995, Freightliner started to apply its newly-introduced livery; this was based on the previous Trainload two-tone grey, with the addition of Freightliner red triangle logo.

The Freightliner fleet were originally employed on intermodal traffic along the northern half of the WCML from Crewe to Coatbridge, near Glasgow. The steep gradients along this route meant that trains were hauled by pairs of locomotives working in multiple. The class also worked services south from Crewe to Tilbury and Ipswich (for onwards movement to Felixstowe by diesel locomotive), and some services to Trafford Park in Manchester. The class have occasionally been used on the East Coast Main Line, particularly when services are diverted due to engineering works.

In 1998, following the introduction of the rebuilt Class 57 diesel locomotives, Freightliner introduced a new livery of racing green with yellow cabsides. The first Class 86 to appear in this livery was no. 86631, which was hurriedly repainted for display at an open day at Toton TMD. The majority of the fleet have slowly been treated over the years such that, by the end of 2004, only a handful remained in the original two-tone grey livery.

In 2000, no. 86608 was regeared experimentally to allow it to work freight trains alone. It was reclassified as Class 86/5 and renumbered 86501. This was the second time this classification and number had been used; the first occasion being former 86/2s dedicated to freight work in the late 1980s (86258 having previously held the 86501 number). Despite the apparent success of 86501's conversion, no further locomotives were similar regeared. In mid-2004, the locomotive suffered fire damage, but was subsequently repaired and returned to service. 86501 again suffered fire damage in August 2008 near Bletchley. It was repaired in December 2008 and returned to service again shortly after.

Due to a locomotive shortage in 2002, two further locomotives, nos. 86426/430, were hired from English Welsh & Scottish, which had just withdrawn its last examples. Since the hire contract was long-term, both locomotives were repainted in Freightliner green livery; they were used in a common pool with the rest of the fleet. By 2004, the need for the extra locomotives was reduced, so both were returned to EWS and subsequently withdrawn.

Two other locomotives, nos. 86101/102, formerly used by Virgin Trains, were also briefly hired by Freightliner in 2001/2002. Neither of these locomotives were repainted and they both retained their obsolete InterCity livery. Due to their non-standard nature, both locomotives had been withdrawn by early 2002.

Following the withdrawal of the Anglia Railways, Virgin Trains and EWS fleets, Freightliner became the last operator of the class. In January 2005, it had an operational fleet of 22 locomotives, with several more in warm-storage (capable of being returned to traffic). In the last few years, however, several locomotives have been withdrawn from service, mainly due to the influx of new Class 66 diesel locomotives; in addition, two locomotives (nos. 86611/631) were written off following the Norton Bridge rail crash and another three (nos. 86615/620/621) have been withdrawn following fire damage and subsequently scrapped. In addition, Freightliner's Class 90 fleet, which were previously hired to passenger operators Virgin Trains and Anglia Railways, have now all returned to the company, thus reducing the requirement for the Class 86 fleet. However, Freightliner retained a core fleet of sixteen locomotives, (Note: Nos. 86604/605/607/608/609/610/612/613/614/ 622/627/628/632/637/638/639), with two locomotives (nos. 86622/637) repainted into Freightliner Powerhaul livery.

By early 2021, the fleet was down to just two locomotives; these were withdrawn from service in March, replaced by ex-Greater Anglia Class 90s.

In July and August 2023, all 16 Freightliner Class 86/6s were purchased by Express Services, Bulgaria and exported.

=== Hull Trains ===
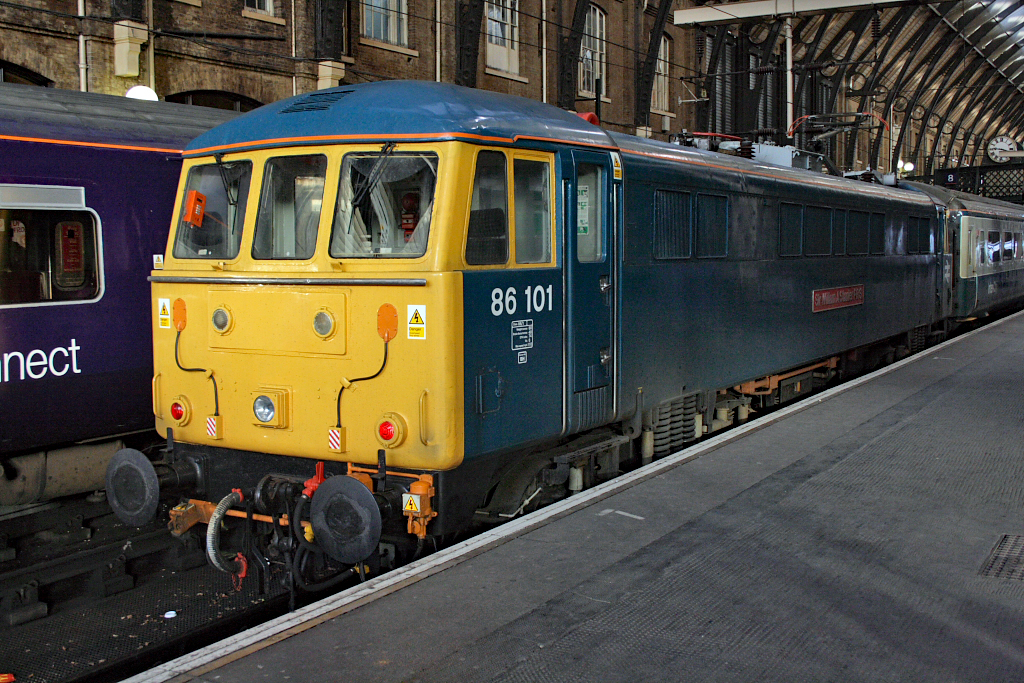
86101 at London King's Cross, being preparing to depart with a service to Doncaster

The open-access passenger operator Hull Trains obtained the use of 86101 between January and April 2008, to provide cover in the short term for its badly damaged Class 222 Pioneer diesel multiple unit (DMU). The locomotive, together with a rake of Mark 3 coaches, was introduced to public services between London King's Cross and Doncaster on 11 January 2008, following several months of tests and training. It ran until 20 April 2008, when Class 180 Adelante DMUs were introduced to the service.

=== Vintage Trains ===
In 2008, privately owned and preserved 86259 was returned to service on the main line, regaining the name of its owner Les Ross. It was operated on occasional charters by Vintage Trains from their base at Tyseley Locomotive Works and, from 2011, was based at Willesden TMD and available for ad-hoc charters. By August 2011, it had covered 5.7 million miles in service. It is currently cleared for operation at up to 100 mph (161 km/h).

=== Virgin Trains ===
The Virgin Rail Group operated two franchises: CrossCountry and InterCity West Coast.

==== CrossCountry ====
Virgin CrossCountry inherited a fleet of 19 locomotives. (Note: Nos. 86206/207/214/222/224/225/226/231/234/ 236/240/242/244/248/249/251/253/256/258) These were employed on various services, such as Birmingham New Street to Manchester Piccadilly, Liverpool Lime Street, Edinburgh Waverley or Glasgow Central. Other services continued south to Birmingham International, whilst others originated from Preston. At Birmingham New Street and Preston, in particular, it was common for the Class 86 locomotive to be removed and replaced with a Class 47 diesel locomotive, before the service continued south to destinations such as Bristol Temple Meads, Penzance, Reading, Brighton, Poole and Weymouth.

From 1998 onwards, locomotives began to be outshopped in the new Virgin Trains red and black livery; however, a few locomotives (Note: Nos. 86207/214/224/234/249/253) retained the old InterCity livery.

In mid-2001, Virgin CrossCountry started to introduce new Class 220 Voyager and Class 221 Super-Voyager DMUs, which enabled Virgin to start to retire its older traction. Several of the early withdrawals were transferred to other operators, such as nos. 86234 and 86242 to Anglia Railways; the majority of locomotives were retained in service until September 2002, when virtually the entire fleet was withdrawn en masse. Prior to this, Virgin had specially repainted no. 86253 in InterCity livery to commemorate its final few months in traffic. The final CrossCountry-operated service was hauled by no. 86233, from the West Coast fleet, which had been repainted in original electric blue livery a few weeks earlier.

Since withdrawal from traffic, several locomotives have been scrapped at Immingham Railfreight Terminal. A few locomotives were sold to other operators for further use, such as no. 86253 to Network Rail and nos. 86231/251 to Fragonset Railways. One locomotive, no. 86249, was retained by Virgin until late-2004, as a driver-training locomotive at Polmadie depot in Glasgow.

==== West Coast ====
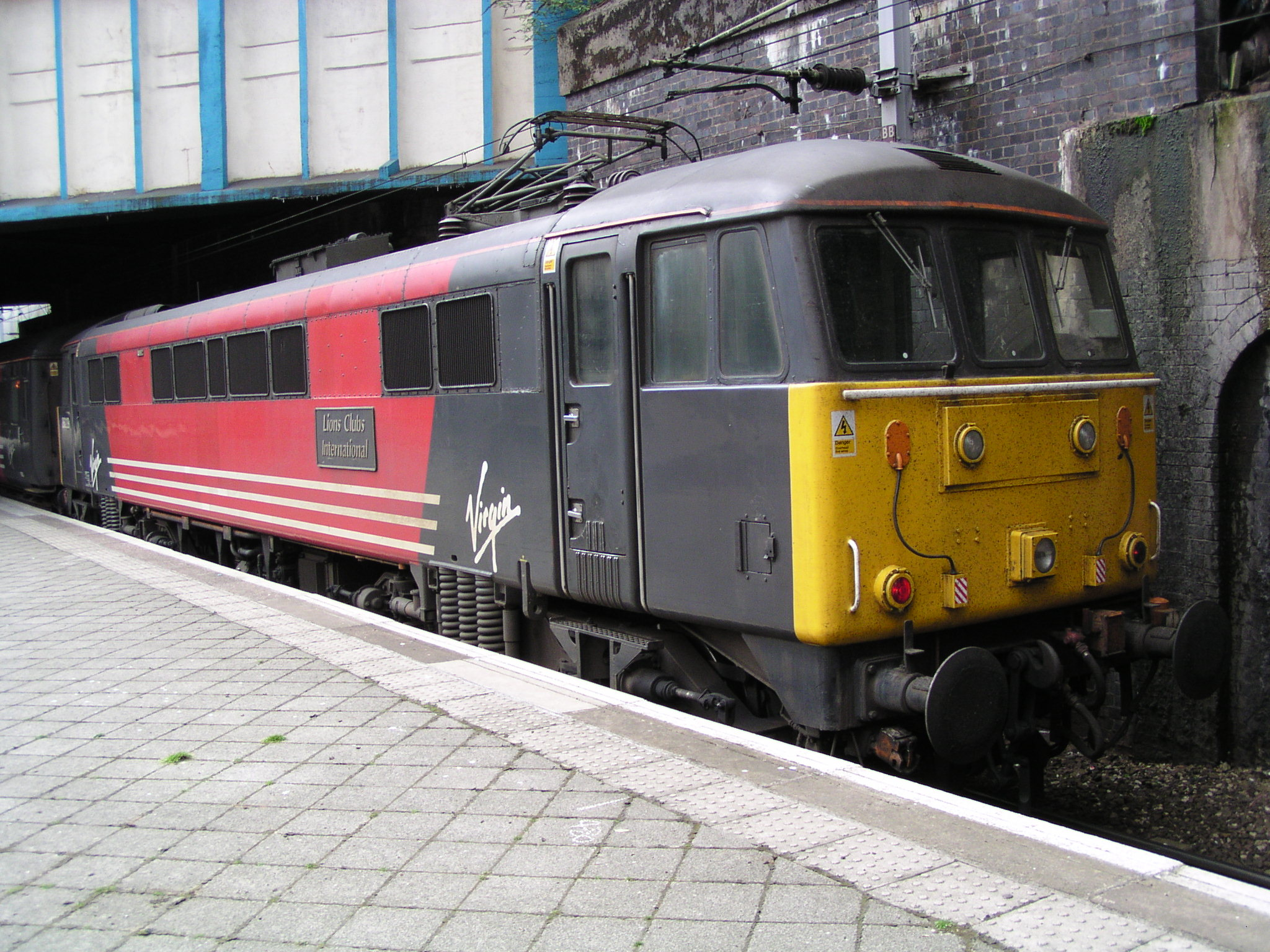
86229 Lions Clubs International at Birmingham New Street

Virgin Trains West Coast inherited a small fleet of thirteen locomotives (Note: Nos. 86101/102, 86205/209/212/213/228/229/233/245/247/259/260), which were employed on WCML express trains from London Euston to Birmingham New Street, Wolverhampton, Manchester Piccadilly, Liverpool Lime Street, Carlisle and Glasgow Central. By 2001, the fleet had been cut to nine locomotives, with 86209 being transferred to Anglia Railways and three more (nos. 86101/102/213) withdrawn from traffic.

In 1998, no. 86229 became the first of the class to be repainted in Virgin's red and black livery. By 2001, all except one locomotive had been repainted in this livery.

The West Coast fleet contained several 'celebrity' locomotives, including no. 86245 Caledonian, which was repainted into a variant of the Virgin livery using Caledonian Railway blue in place of the standard red, to celebrate the company's 150th anniversary. In 2002, no. 86233 was specially repainted into original electric blue to commemorate the last few months in traffic for the fleet. One locomotive, no. 86228, retained its old InterCity livery.

In mid-2003, the rundown of the fleet started as new Class 390 Pendolino electric multiple units entered service. The final three locomotives (nos. 86229/233/247) were removed from traffic in September 2003; the final service being operated by no. 86233. Several of the fleet were later transferred to other operators, including Anglia Railways (no. 86260) and Fragonset Railways (nos. 86212/229/233). One locomotive (no. 86259) has been preserved.

=== Network Rail ===
In 2004, Network Rail acquired three locomotives (nos. 86210/253/424), of which the first two were converted to mobile load-bank testing locomotives and were reclassified as Class 86/9 and renumbered as 86901/902; the third was used for spares. They carried Network Rail's all-over yellow livery and were based at Rugby station from 2004. Their primary use was to test the overhead line supply of electrified lines by simulating various loads. Both locomotives were capable of running under their own power for positioning purposes, but could not haul any significant loads; therefore, when being used to test the overhead supply, they had to be hauled by a diesel locomotive.

As of 8 January 2014, they were removed from service and were moved to Derby Litchurch Lane Works; they were extracted from Derby by low-loader and taken to Long Marston for storage. 86901 was subsequently taken to Sandbach Car and Commercial Dismantlers, where it was broken up, whilst 86902 suffered the same fate at CF Booth's scrapyard in Rotherham. 86424, the erstwhile source of spares, was exported to Hungary, where it was used initially as a source of spares for the Class 86s that were purchased by Floyd Zrt for freight usage; it was returned to service with Floyd in late 2018, due to its need for an additional locomotive.

== Current operators ==
=== Bulgaria export ===
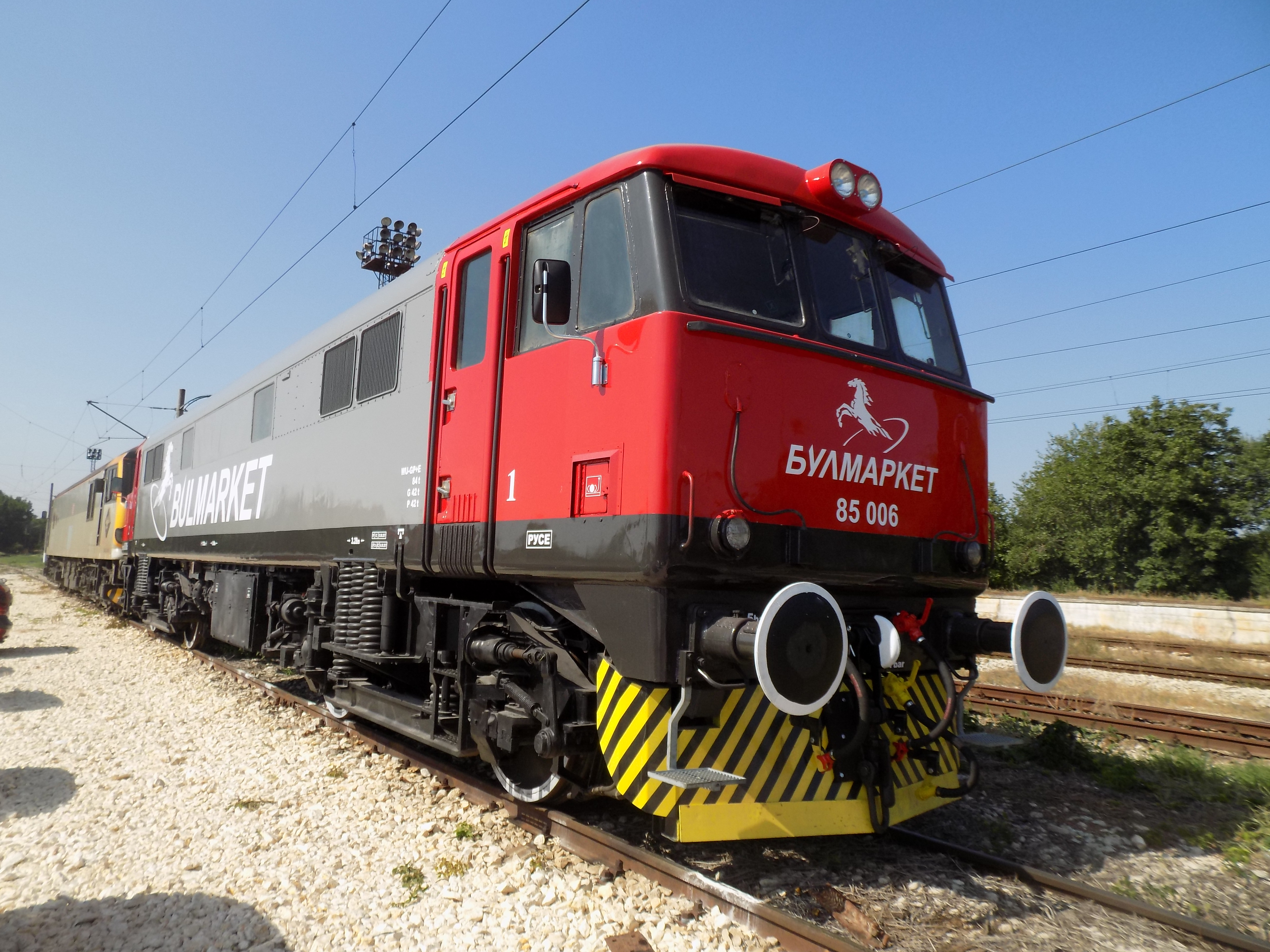
86234 was overhauled and renumbered 85006 at Express Service Ruse, Bulgaria in 2017

The first Class 86 to be exported to Bulgaria was 86233 in October 2012. It served as a spares donor for Bulmarket's previously exported Class 87s, nos. 87009/017/023/025. In March 2016, Bulmarket purchased an additional six Class 86 locomotives with the intent of operating them alongside their Class 87s. By the end of 2017, it had a fully operational fleet of six locomotives, renumbered into the 85xxx range. (Note: New numbers are: 85001 (ex-86701), 85002 (ex-86702), 85003 (ex-86213), 85004 (ex-86235), 85005 (ex-86231) and 85006 (ex-86234))

During July and August 2023, all sixteen Freightliner Class 86/6s were purchased by Express Services and exported to Bulgaria.

=== Hungary export ===
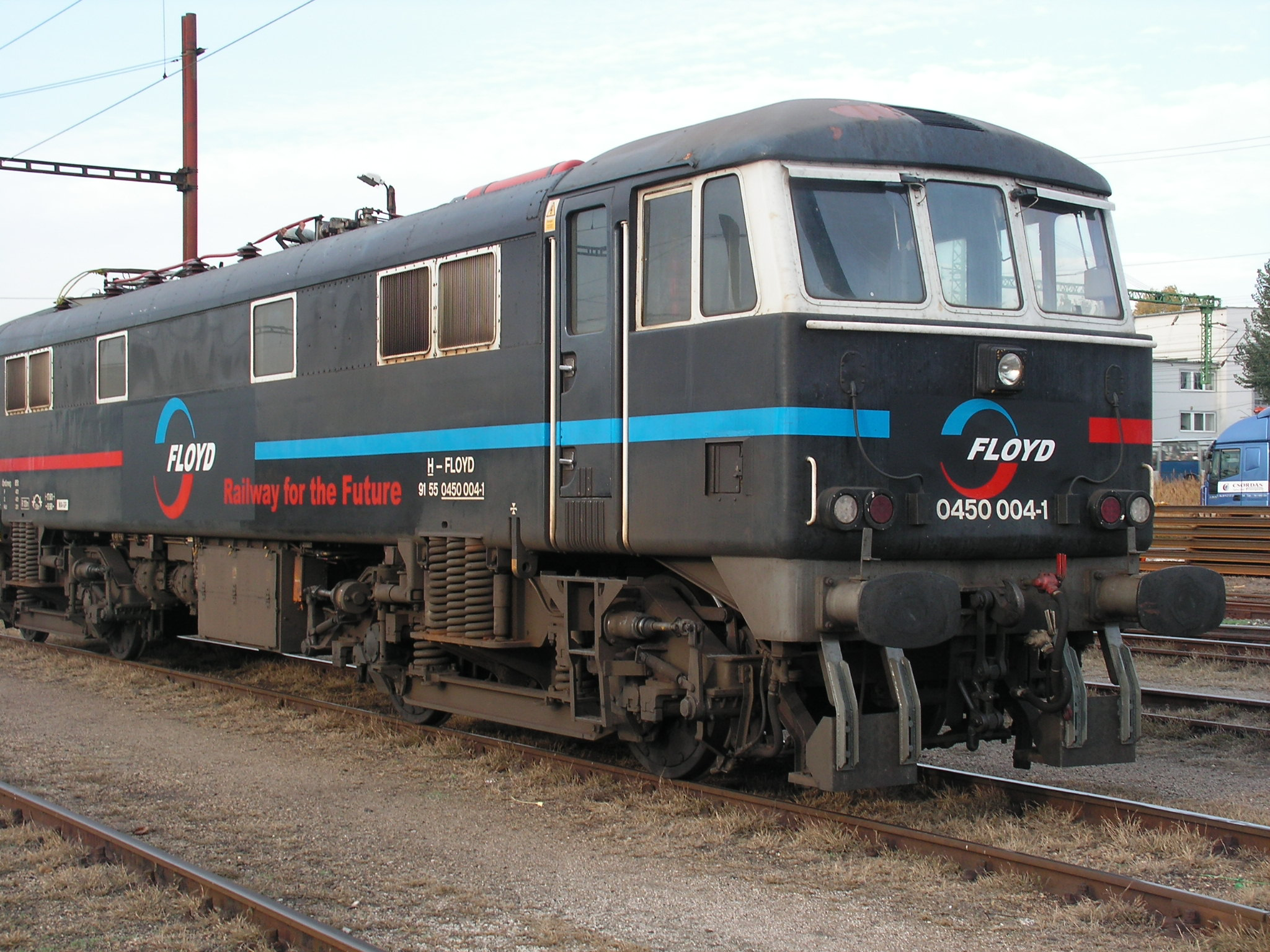
0450 004-1 (previously 86218), owned by the Hungarian Floyd ZRt in Kecskemét, Hungary

In 2008, Europhoenix completed a deal to purchase the remaining Class 86/2 fleet from HSBC Rail Leasing, numbering 23 locomotives, with the intention of overhauling some of them for use in Europe and the UK. 86248 and 86250 were sold to Hungarian private open access freight operator Floyd Zrt and were delivered in February and May 2009, becoming Hungarian Class 450. As of 2020, Floyd Zrt owns nine Class 86 locomotives. (Note: 86215 (0450 005-8), 86217 (0450 006-6), 86218 (0450 004-1), 86228 (0450 007-4), 86232 (0450 003-3), 86242 (0450 008-2), 86248 (0450 001-7), 86250 (0450 002-5) and 86424 (0450 009-0))

=== Locomotive Services ===
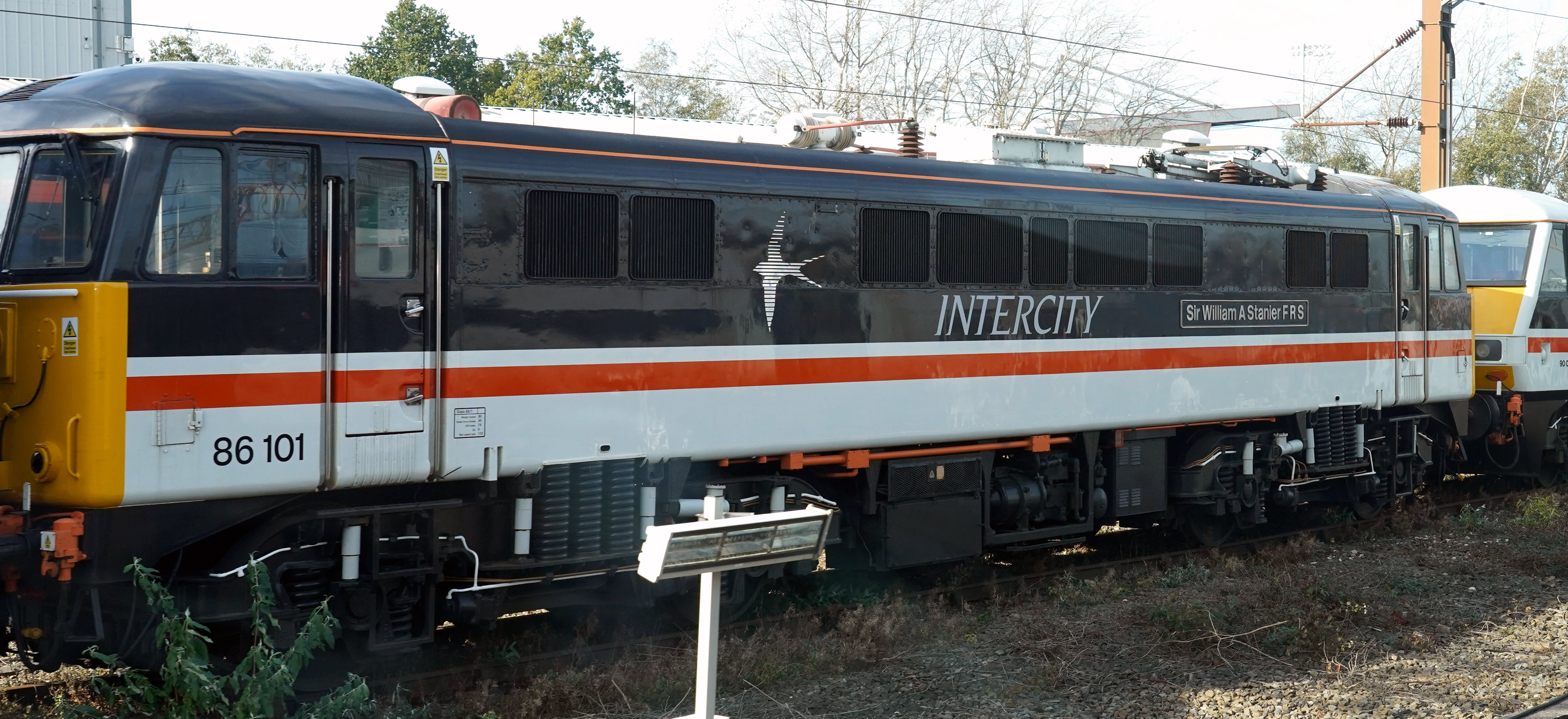
86 101 in InterCity Swallow livery

Following their replacement on the Caledonian Sleeper trains, one of the two Class 86s that was owned by the AC Locomotive Group, 86101 Sir William A Stanier FRS, was sold to Locomotive Services Limited in November 2019, along with Class 87 no. 87002. 86101 was then repainted from its Caledonian blue livery into InterCity Swallow colours, along with 87002, 90001 and 90002.

=== West Coast Railways ===
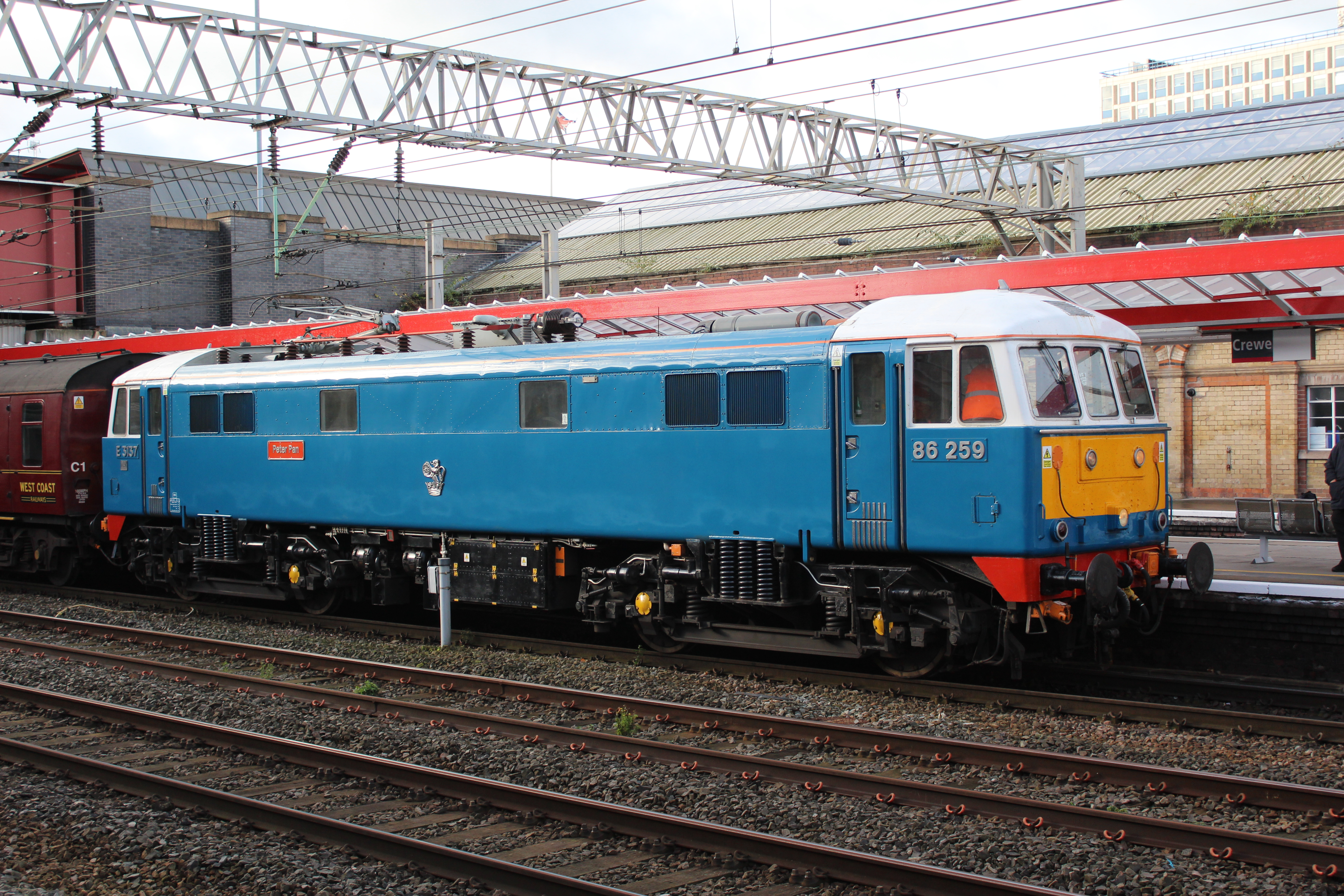
86259, Les Ross / Peter Pan, at Crewe (2017)

Privately-owned Class 86, no. 86259, was transferred from operating with Vintage Trains in around 2012. It is currently used by West Coast Railways hauling excursion trains from London Euston; these have included the regular Cumbrian Mountain Express excursions and the Pennine Blackpool Express, its first visit to Blackpool North.

In February 2020, West Coast Railway acquired its first Class 86, no. 86401 Mons Meg, which had previously been owned by the AC Locomotive Group and used on the Caledonian Sleeper services. Following the replacement of the sleeper's Mark 2 and Mark 3 coaches with new Mark 5 coaches, 86401 was taken off lease.

== Preservation ==
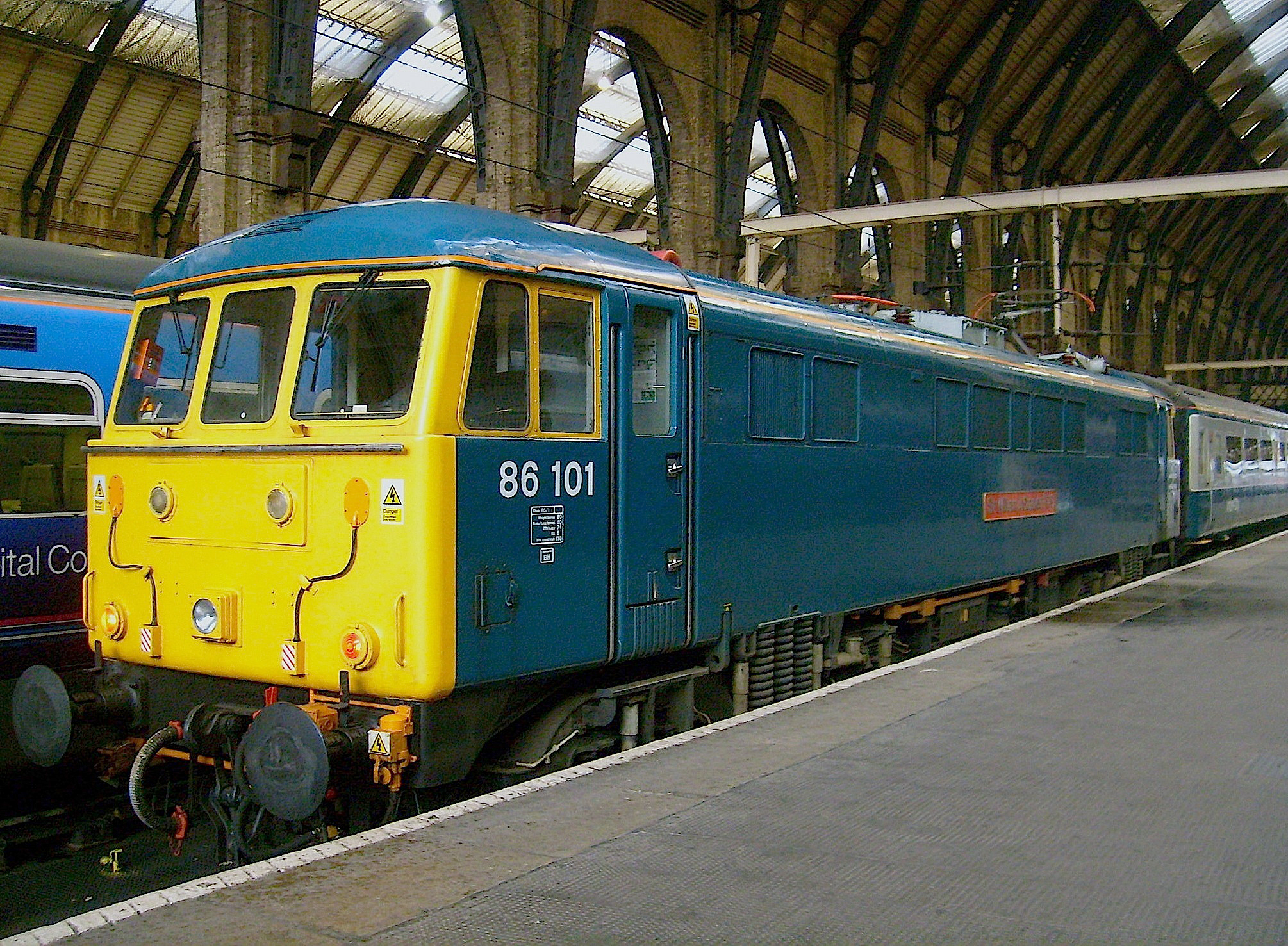
86101 Sir William A Stanier FRS at London Kings Cross

Currently three locomotives have been preserved, with examples from both manufacturers:

- The first locomotive to be preserved was 86401, which was named Hertfordshire Rail Tours at the time. This locomotive was operated by EWS until 2002, when it was one of their three final machines to be withdrawn from traffic. Prior to that, it was the only locomotive of its class to be painted in Network SouthEast livery and was named Northampton Town. In this guise, it was used on London Liverpool Street-Cambridge and London Euston-Northampton passenger trains. In 2004, 86401 was preserved by the AC Locomotive Group, based at Barrow Hill Roundhouse. It was deployed initially in the reserve fleet of operational shunting/depot service locomotives at Willesden TMD. In February 2015, 86401 moved to Leicester Carriage Sidings, where it underwent renovation work; modifications included the fitting of GSM-R and OTMR, the recommissioning of the TDM system and attention to the components and bodywork. On 12 May 2015, it was moved to Brush Traction, where it was repainted into Caledonian Blue livery and renamed Mons Meg; it was used subsequently on Serco's Caledonian Sleeper contract. The locomotive was purchased by West Coast Railways in February 2020 and is now based at Carnforth MPD; it has since hauled a small number of railtours.
- 86101 was preserved by the AC Locomotive Group in August 2005. It was stored initially at MoD Ashchurch, but was restored to working condition at Barrow Hill. On 15 March 2007, it undertook its first test run; it then hauled the Carlisle-Crewe and return legs of The Ynys Mon Express railtour to Holyhead on 24 March 2007. In December 2014, after a few years in storage, 86101 made its initial main line run to and from Willesden TMD. In February 2015, 86101 was selected as one of the locomotives to support the new Caledonian Sleeper services; it was taken to Brush Traction, where it was painted into Caledonian Blue livery. From March 2015 to September 2019, it was used to convey empty coaching stock for the Caledonian sleepers between London Euston and Wembley InterCity depot, as well as between Glasgow Central and Polmadie TRSMD, alongside 87002. 86101 was sold to Locomotive Services Limited in November 2019, along with 87002, and was painted back into InterCity Swallow livery; it currently hauls excursions.
- 86259 has been preserved, initially at Tyseley Locomotive Works and, as of late 2017, stabled at Rugby station. It is owned by Les Ross, after whom the locomotive was named. It is maintained in full operational condition, wearing its initial electric blue livery. The engine also wears different nameplates; on one side, it carries the nameplate Les Ross and, on the other, it has the nameplate Peter Pan. It also has its original number E3137 at one end and 86259 at the other. It hauls the Cumbrian Mountain Express excursions several times each year, in conjunction with Railway Touring Company.

| Numbers (current in bold) | | | Name | Livery | Location | Status | Builder | Built | Withdrawn | Service length | Owner | Operator | Notes |
|---|---|---|---|---|---|---|---|---|---|---|---|---|---|
| **E3137** | 86045 | **86259** | Les Ross; Peter Pan | 1960s Electric Blue | Rugby railway station | Operational (main line registered) | Doncaster Works | Jan 1966 | Oct 2003 | 38 years, 9 months | Les Ross | West Coast Railways | |
| E3191 | 86201 | **86101** | Sir William A Stanier FRS | InterCity Swallow | Crewe Diesel TMD | Operational (main line registered) | Vulcan Foundry | Nov 1965 | Dec 2001 | 36 years, 1 month | Locomotive Services Limited | Locomotive Services | |
| E3199 | 86001 | **86401** | Mons Meg | Caledonian Blue | Carnforth MPD | Operational (main line registered) | Vulcan Foundry | Jan 1966 | Jun 2004 | 38 years, 5 months | West Coast Railways | West Coast Railways | |

A further locomotive, 86213, was preserved initially by the AC Locomotive Group, but has since been sold to Bulmarket and exported to Bulgaria.

Three cab sections have been saved from scrapped locomotives. Two cabs from 86247 were saved by the South Wales Cab Preservation Group and one cab from 86902 was saved by a private owner. One cab from 86247 has since been sold to a private owner and is on display at Crewe Heritage Centre.

== Fleet details ==
| Key: | In Service | Withdrawn | Preserved | Scrapped | Exported |

| Numbers | | | Name(s) | Dates named | Current /Final livery | Operator | Withdrawn | Status |
| TOPS | | BTC | Name(s) | Dates named | Current /Final livery | Operator | Withdrawn | Status |
|---|---|---|---|---|---|---|---|---|
| 86101 | 86201 | E3191 | Sir William A Stanier FRS (Note: Named on 27 October 1978 at Liverpool Lime Street.) | 1978–2005; 2006– | InterCity Swallow | Locomotive Services | - | Preserved operational |
| 86102 | 86202 | E3150 | Robert A Riddles (Note: Named at London Euston on 19 May 1981.) | 1981–2002 | InterCity | Freightliner | 04/2002 | Scrapped at MoD Caerwent (04/2005) |
| 86103 | 86203 | E3143 | André Chapelon | 1981–1995 | InterCity | Virgin Cross-Country | 05/1995 | Scrapped at Immingham RFT (11/2002) |
| 86204 | - | E3173 | City of Carlisle (Note: Named on 7 December 1978 at Carlisle.) | 1978–1998 | InterCity | Virgin Cross-Country | 08/1998 | Scrapped at Immingham RFT (07/2003) |
| 86205 | 86503 | E3129 | City of Lancaster | 1979–2003 | Colas Rail | Colas Rail | 10/2003 | Exported to Bulgaria, renumbered 85001. See 86701 below. |
| 86206 | - | E3184 | City of Stoke on Trent | 1978–2002 | Virgin Red/Black | Virgin Cross-Country | 10/2002 | Scrapped at Cardiff (02/2004) |
| 86207 | - | E3179 | City of Lichfield | 1981–2002 | InterCity | Virgin Cross-Country | 07/2002 | Scrapped at Rotherham (04/2006) |
| 86208 | - | E3141 | City of Chester (Note: Named on 7 March 1979 at Chester.) | 1979–2000 | InterCity | EWS | 03/2002 | Scrapped at Crewe Electric TMD (07/2003) |
| 86209 | - | E3125 | City of Coventry | 1979–2004 | Anglia Railways | Anglia Railways | 10/2004 | Involved in Bushey accident (23/01/1975). Scrapped at Boreham, Essex (07/2005) |
| 86210 | - | E3190 | City of Edinburgh (Note: Named on 27 February 1979 at Edinburgh.) | 1981–1995 | Network Rail yellow | Network Rail | 12/2002 | Scrapped. See 86902 below. |
| 86210 | - | E3190 | C.I.T. 75th Anniversary | 1995–2003 | Network Rail yellow | Network Rail | 12/2002 | Scrapped. See 86902 below. |
| 86211 | - | E3147 | City of Milton Keynes | 1982–1986 | BR Blue | British Rail | 11/1986 | Written off in Colwich accident in 1986. Scrapped at Crewe Works (09/1987) |
| 86212 | - | E3151 | Preston Guild | 1979–1992 | Virgin Red/Black | FM Rail | 10/2003 | Scrapped at EMR Kingsbury (02/2011) |
| 86212 | - | E3151 | Preston Guild 1328–1992 | 1992–2003 | Virgin Red/Black | FM Rail | 10/2003 | Scrapped at EMR Kingsbury (02/2011) |
| 86213 | - | E3193 | Lancashire Witch | 1981– | InterCity | AC Locomotive Group | 09/1998 | Initially preserved, but later sold for export to Bulgaria in February 2016. Operated by Bulmarket, renumbered to 85003. |
| 86214 | - | E3106 | Sans Pareil | 1980–2002 | InterCity | Virgin Cross-Country | 10/2002 | Scrapped at Rotherham (03/2006) |
| 86215 | - | E3165 | Joseph Chamberlain | 1981–1996 | Anglia Railways | 'one' | 10/2004 | Exported to Hungary (05/2012). Operated by Floyd ZRt, no. 0450 005-8. |
| 86215 | - | E3165 | Norwich Cathedral | 1996–1997 | Anglia Railways | 'one' | 10/2004 | Exported to Hungary (05/2012). Operated by Floyd ZRt, no. 0450 005-8. |
| 86215 | - | E3165 | Norfolk and Norwich Festival | 1998–1999 | Anglia Railways | 'one' | 10/2004 | Exported to Hungary (05/2012). Operated by Floyd ZRt, no. 0450 005-8. |
| 86215 | - | E3165 | The Round Tabler | 2003–2004 | Anglia Railways | 'one' | 10/2004 | Exported to Hungary (05/2012). Operated by Floyd ZRt, no. 0450 005-8. |
| 86216 | - | E3166 | Meteor | 1978–2002 | InterCity | Virgin West Coast | 04/1998 | Scrapped at Immingham RFT (03/2003) |
| 86217 | 86504 | E3177 | Comet | 1980–1985 | Anglia Railways | FM Rail | 04/2004 | Exported to Hungary (02/2013). Operated by Floyd ZRt, no. 450 006-6. |
| 86217 | 86504 | E3177 | Halley's Comet | 1985–1994 | Anglia Railways | FM Rail | 04/2004 | Exported to Hungary (02/2013). Operated by Floyd ZRt, no. 450 006-6. |
| 86217 | 86504 | E3177 | City University | 1994–2004 | Anglia Railways | FM Rail | 04/2004 | Exported to Hungary (02/2013). Operated by Floyd ZRt, no. 450 006-6. |
| 86218 | - | E3175 | Planet | 1979–1993 | Anglia Railways | 'one' | 09/2004 | Exported to Hungary (02/2011). Operated by Floyd ZRt, no. 0450 004-1. |
| 86218 | - | E3175 | Harold Macmillan | 1993–1997 | Anglia Railways | 'one' | 09/2004 | Exported to Hungary (02/2011). Operated by Floyd ZRt, no. 0450 004-1. |
| 86218 | - | E3175 | Year of Opera and Musical Theatre 1997 | 1997–1998 | Anglia Railways | 'one' | 09/2004 | Exported to Hungary (02/2011). Operated by Floyd ZRt, no. 0450 004-1. |
| 86218 | - | E3175 | NHS 50 | 1998- | Anglia Railways | 'one' | 09/2004 | Exported to Hungary (02/2011). Operated by Floyd ZRt, no. 0450 004-1. |
| 86219 | - | E3196 | Phoenix | 1978–2002 | InterCity | Virgin West Coast | 05/1996 | Scrapped at Immingham RFT (05/2002) |
| 86220 | - | E3156 | Goliath | 1979–1987 | Anglia Railways | Anglia Railways | 05/2002 | Scrapped at Immingham RFT (11/2003) |
| 86220 | - | E3156 | The Round Tabler | 1987–2002 | Anglia Railways | Anglia Railways | 05/2002 | Scrapped at Immingham RFT (11/2003) |
| 86221 | - | E3132 | Vesta | 1979–1987 | Anglia Railways | Anglia Railways | 05/2003 | Scrapped at Immingham RFT (11/2003) |
| 86221 | - | E3132 | BBC Look East | 1987–2003 | Anglia Railways | Anglia Railways | 05/2003 | Scrapped at Immingham RFT (11/2003) |
| 86222 | 86502 | E3131 | Fury | 1979–1987 | Virgin Red/Black | Virgin Cross-Country | 10/2002 | Scrapped at Immingham RFT (12/2003) |
| 86222 | 86502 | E3131 | Lloyd's List | 1987–1989 | Virgin Red/Black | Virgin Cross-Country | 10/2002 | Scrapped at Immingham RFT (12/2003) |
| 86222 | 86502 | E3131 | Lloyd's List 250th Anniversary | 1989–1994 | Virgin Red/Black | Virgin Cross-Country | 10/2002 | Scrapped at Immingham RFT (12/2003) |
| 86222 | 86502 | E3131 | Clothes Show Live | 1994–2002 | Virgin Red/Black | Virgin Cross-Country | 10/2002 | Scrapped at Immingham RFT (12/2003) |
| 86223 | - | E3158 | Hector | 1979–1987 | Anglia Railways | FM Rail | 04/2004 | Scrapped at EMR Kingsbury (04/2011) |
| 86223 | - | E3158 | Norwich Union | 1987–2004 | Anglia Railways | FM Rail | 04/2004 | Scrapped at EMR Kingsbury (04/2011) |
| 86224 | - | E3134 | Caledonian | 1979–1988 | InterCity | Virgin Cross-Country | 07/2002 | Scrapped at Rotherham (05/2006) |
| 86225 | - | E3164 | Hardwicke | 1980–2003 | Virgin Red/Black | Virgin Cross-Country | 07/2002 | Scrapped at Rotherham (04/2006) |
| 86226 | - | E3162 | Mail | 1979–1984 | Virgin Red/Black | Virgin Cross-Country | 07/2002 | Scrapped at EMR Kingsbury 04/2011 |
| 86226 | - | E3162 | Royal Mail Midlands | 1984–1996 | Virgin Red/Black | Virgin Cross-Country | 07/2002 | Scrapped at EMR Kingsbury 04/2011 |
| 86226 | - | E3162 | Charles Rennie Mackintosh | 1996–2002 | Virgin Red/Black | Virgin Cross-Country | 07/2002 | Scrapped at EMR Kingsbury 04/2011 |
| 86227 | - | E3117 | Sir Henry Johnson | 1981–2002 | Anglia Railways (with Union Flag) | 'one' | 10/2004 | Scrapped at Rotherham (07/2005) |
| 86227 | - | E3117 | Golden Jubilee | 2002–2004 | Anglia Railways (with Union Flag) | 'one' | 10/2004 | Scrapped at Rotherham (07/2005) |
| 86228 | - | E3167 | Vulcan Heritage | 1980- | InterCity | Virgin West Coast | 10/2003 | Exported to Hungary (07/2013). Operated by Floyd ZRt, no. 0450 007-4 |
| 86229 | - | E3119 | Sir John Betjeman (Note: 86229 was named on 24 June 1983 by Sir John Betjeman, himself, at London St Pancras.) | 1983–1998 | Virgin Red/Black | FM Rail | 10/2003 | Scrapped at Sandbach Commercial Dismantlers (02/2020). |
| 86229 | - | E3119 | Lions Club International | 1998–2003 | Virgin Red/Black | FM Rail | 10/2003 | Scrapped at Sandbach Commercial Dismantlers (02/2020). |
| 86230 | - | E3168 | The Duke of Wellington | 1981–1997 | Anglia Railways | 'one' | 10/2004 | Scrapped at EMR Kingsbury (05/2011) |
| 86231 | - | E3126 | Starlight Express | 1984–2002 | Virgin Red/Black | FM Rail | 07/2002 | Exported to Bulgaria. Operated by Bulmarket, renumbered to 85005. |
| 86231 | - | E3126 | Lady of the Lake | 2017– | Virgin Red/Black | FM Rail | 07/2002 | Exported to Bulgaria. Operated by Bulmarket, renumbered to 85005. |
| 86232 | - | E3113 | Harold Macmillan | 1979–1990 | Anglia Railways | 'one' | 07/2005 | Exported to Hungary (04/2010). Operated by Floyd ZRt, no. 0450 003-3 |
| 86232 | - | E3113 | Norfolk and Norwich Festival | 1990–1995 | Anglia Railways | 'one' | 07/2005 | Exported to Hungary (04/2010). Operated by Floyd ZRt, no. 0450 003-3 |
| 86232 | - | E3113 | Norfolk and Norwich Festival | 2001–2005 | Anglia Railways | 'one' | 07/2005 | Exported to Hungary (04/2010). Operated by Floyd ZRt, no. 0450 003-3 |
| 86233 | 86506 | E3172 | Laurence Olivier | 1980–2002 | BR Electric Blue | Swift Rail Ltd | 11/2007 | Exported to Bulgaria as a source of spares. Scrapped in Bulgaria (2019) |
| 86233 | 86506 | E3172 | Alstom Heritage | 2002–2003 | BR Electric Blue | Swift Rail Ltd | 11/2007 | Exported to Bulgaria as a source of spares. Scrapped in Bulgaria (2019) |
| 86234 | - | E3155 | J B Priestley OM | 1980–2002 | Anglia Railways | 'one' | 04/2005 | Exported to Bulgaria. Operated by Bulmarket, renumbered to 85006. |
| 86234 | - | E3155 | Suffolk - Relax Refresh Return | 2002- | Anglia Railways | 'one' | 04/2005 | Exported to Bulgaria. Operated by Bulmarket, renumbered to 85006. |
| 86235 | - | E3194 | Novelty | 1979–1990 | Anglia Railways | 'one' | 09/2005 | Exported to Bulgaria. Operated by Bulmarket, renumbered to 85004. |
| 86235 | - | E3194 | Harold Macmillan | 1990–1992 | Anglia Railways | 'one' | 09/2005 | Exported to Bulgaria. Operated by Bulmarket, renumbered to 85004. |
| 86235 | - | E3194 | Crown Point | 1992- | Anglia Railways | 'one' | 09/2005 | Exported to Bulgaria. Operated by Bulmarket, renumbered to 85004. |
| 86236 | - | E3133 | Josiah Wedgwood: Master Potter 1736–1795 | 1978–2002 | Virgin Red/Black | Virgin Cross-Country | 10/2002 | Scrapped at Immingham RFT (12/2003) |
| 86237 | - | E3197 | Sir Charles Hallé | 1983–1993 | Anglia Railways | 'one' | 04/2004 | Scrapped at Cardiff (10/2004) |
| 86237 | - | E3197 | University of East Anglia | 1993–2004 | Anglia Railways | 'one' | 04/2004 | Scrapped at Cardiff (10/2004) |
| 86238 | - | E3116 | European Community | 1986–2004 | Anglia Railways | 'one' | 10/2004 | Scrapped at Boreham, Essex (05/2005) |
| 86239 | 86507 | E3169 | L. S. Lowry | 1980–1996 | Rail Express Systems | EWS | 04/1996 | Written off in Stafford accident. Scrapped at Crewe Electric TMD (04/1997) |
| 86240 | - | E3127 | Bishop Eric Treacy (Note: Named on 3 April 1979 at Penrith.) | 1979–2002 | Virgin Red/Black | Virgin Cross-Country | 10/2002 | Scrapped at Rotherham (04/2005) |
| 86241 | 86508 | E3121 | Glenfiddich (Note: Named on 28 March 1979 at Glasgow.) | 1979–2003 | Rail Express Systems | EWS | 01/2000 | Scrapped at Crewe Electric TMD (02/2003) |
| 86242 | - | E3138 | James Kennedy GC | 1981–2002 | Anglia Railways | 'one' | 10/2004 | Involved in Nuneaton rail crash (1975). Exported to Hungary (07/2013). Operated by Floyd ZRt, no. 0450 008-2 |
| 86242 | - | E3138 | Colchester Castle | 2002–2004 | Anglia Railways | 'one' | 10/2004 | Involved in Nuneaton rail crash (1975). Exported to Hungary (07/2013). Operated by Floyd ZRt, no. 0450 008-2 |
| 86243 | - | E3181 | The Boys' Brigade (Note: Named by Sir David McNee, on 9 April 1983 at Glasgow Central.) | 1983–1993 | Rail Express Systems | EWS | 11/2002 | Scrapped at C.F. Booth, Rotherham (09/2004) |
| 86244 | - | E3178 | The Royal British Legion | 1981–2002 | Virgin Red/Black | Virgin Cross-Country | 10/2002 | Scrapped at Immingham RFT (11/2003) |
| 86245 | - | E3182 | Dudley Castle | 1984–1998 | Virgin Red/Black | Virgin West Coast | 10/2003 | Scrapped at EMR Kingsbury (06/2010) |
| 86245 | - | E3182 | Caledonian | 1998–2003 | Virgin Red/Black | Virgin West Coast | 10/2003 | Scrapped at EMR Kingsbury (06/2010) |
| 86246 | 86505 | E3149 | Royal Anglian Regiment | 1985–2005 | Anglia Railways | 'one' | 12/2004 | Stripped of spare parts for 86101, 86401 and 87002 at Willesden TMD. Some parts were transported to Barrow Hill for use on 81002, 82008, 83012 and 85101. Scrapped at C.F. Booth, Rotherham (01/2017) |
| 86247 | - | E3192 | Abraham Darby | 1981–2003 | Europhoenix | Europhoenix | 10/2003 | Scrapped at Crewe Basford Hall (12/2015). Two cabs preserved by private owners. |
| 86248 | - | E3107 | County of Clwyd / Sir Clwyd | 1981–2003 | Virgin Red/Black | Virgin Cross-Country | 10/2002 | Exported to Hungary (2/2009). Operated by Floyd ZRt, number 0450 001-7 |
| 86249 | - | E3161 | County of Merseyside | 1981–2005 | InterCity | Virgin Cross-Country | 10/2003 | Scrapped at MoD Caerwent (10/2005) |
| 86250 | - | E3189 | The Glasgow Herald | 1980–1998 | Anglia Railways | FM Rail | 04/2004 | Exported to Hungary (5/2009). Operated by Floyd ZRt, no. 0450 002-5 |
| 86250 | - | E3189 | Sheppard 100 | 2003–2004 | Anglia Railways | FM Rail | 04/2004 | Exported to Hungary (5/2009). Operated by Floyd ZRt, no. 0450 002-5 |
| 86251 | - | E3183 | The Birmingham Post | 1984–2002 | Virgin Red/Black | FM Rail | 10/2002 | Scrapped at C.F. Booth, Rotherham (1/2023) |
| 86252 | - | E3101 | The Liverpool Daily Post | 1980–2000 | Anglia Railways | Anglia Railways | 05/2002 | Scrapped at Immingham RFT (08/2002) |
| 86252 | - | E3101 | Sheppard 100 | 2000–2002 | Anglia Railways | Anglia Railways | 05/2002 | Scrapped at Immingham RFT (08/2002) |
| 86253 | 86044 | E3136 | The Manchester Guardian | 1980–2004 | Network Rail yellow | Network Rail | 10/2002 | Scrapped. See 86901 below. |
| 86254 | 86047 | E3142 | William Webb Ellis | 1980–1996 | Rail Express Systems | EWS | 10/2002 | Scrapped at C F Booth, Rotherham (08/2004) |
| 86255 | 86042 | E3154 | Penrith Beacon | 1981–1999 | InterCity | Virgin Cross-Country | 08/1998 | Scrapped at Immingham RFT (09/2002) |
| 86256 | 86040 | E3135 | Pebble Mill | 1981–2003 | Virgin Red/Black | Virgin Cross-Country | 10/2002 | Scrapped at Rotherham (03/2006) |
| 86257 | 86043 | E3139 | Snowdon | 1981–1999 | Anglia Railways | Anglia Railways | 11/2002 | Scrapped at Immingham RFT (11/2003) |
| 86258 | 86046; 86501 | E3140 | Talyllyn - The First Preserved Railway | 1984–2001 | Virgin Red/Black | Virgin Cross-Country | 07/2002 | Conversion to battery-electric locomotive cancelled. Scrapped at EMR Kingsbury (12/2009) |
| 86258 | 86046; 86501 | E3140 | Talyllyn - 50 Years of Railway Preservation 1951-2001 | 2001-2002 | Virgin Red/Black | Virgin Cross-Country | 07/2002 | Conversion to battery-electric locomotive cancelled. Scrapped at EMR Kingsbury (12/2009) |
| 86259 | 86045 | E3137 | Peter Pan | 1979–1995 | BR Electric Blue | Peter Pan Locomotive Ltd (Les Ross) | 10/2003 | Preserved operational. Stabled at Rugby station |
| 86259 | 86045 | E3137 | Greater Manchester; The Life & Soul Of Britain | 1995–2002 | BR Electric Blue | Peter Pan Locomotive Ltd (Les Ross) | 10/2003 | Preserved operational. Stabled at Rugby station |
| 86259 | 86045 | E3137 | Les Ross / Peter Pan | 2002–present | BR Electric Blue | Peter Pan Locomotive Ltd (Les Ross) | 10/2003 | Preserved operational. Stabled at Rugby station |
| 86260 | 86048 | E3144 | Driver Wallace Oakes GC | 1981–2003 | Anglia Railways | 'One' | 05/2004 | Exported to Bulgaria. See 86702 below. |
| 86261 | 86041 | E3118 | Driver John Axon GC | 1981–1992 | EWS Red/Gold | EWS | 11/2002 | Scrapped at C.F. Booth, Rotherham (12/2004) |
| 86261 | 86041 | E3118 | The Rail Charter Partnership | 1997–2004 | EWS Red/Gold | EWS | 11/2002 | Scrapped at C.F. Booth, Rotherham (12/2004) |
| 86401 | 86001 | E3199 | Northampton Town | 1989–1991 | Caledonian Blue | West Coast Railways, Carnforth | - | Preserved operational |
| 86401 | 86001 | E3199 | Hertfordshire Rail Tours | 1998–2002 | Caledonian Blue | West Coast Railways, Carnforth | - | Preserved operational |
| 86401 | 86001 | E3199 | Northampton Town | 2005–2015 | Caledonian Blue | West Coast Railways, Carnforth | - | Preserved operational |
| 86401 | 86001 | E3199 | Mons Meg | 2015–present | Caledonian Blue | West Coast Railways, Carnforth | - | Preserved operational |
| 86416 | 86316 | E3109 | Wigan Pier | 1984–1992 | Rail Express Systems | EWS | 02/2002 | Scrapped at C.F. Booth, Rotherham (07/2005) |
| 86417 | 86317 | E3146 | The Kingsman | 1985–1993 | Rail Express Systems | EWS | 09/2001 | Scrapped at C.F. Booth, Rotherham (11/2004) |
| 86419 | 86319 | E3120 | Post Haste 150 Years of the Travelling Post Office | 1990–1993 | Rail Express Systems | EWS | 03/1999 | Scrapped at Crewe Electric TMD (03/2003) |
| 86424 | 86324 | E3111 | - | - | NR Yellow | Network Rail | 12/2002 | Exported to Hungary (08/2013). Operated by Floyd ZRt, no. 0450 009-0. Returned to service in 2018. |
| 86425 | 86325 | E3186 | Saint Mungo | 1995–2003 | Rail Express Systems | EWS | 02/2002 | Scrapped at C.F. Booth, Rotherham (01/2005) |
| 86426 | 86326 | E3195 | Pride of the Nation | 1998–2002 | Freightliner Green | EWS | 06/2004 | Derailed at Bushbury Junction (13/08/1979). Scrapped at C.F. Booth, Rotherham (11/2005) |
| 86429 | 86329 | E3200 | The Times | 1982–1986 | InterCity | British Rail | 11/1986 | Written off in Colwich accident (1986). Scrapped at Crewe Works (11/1986) |
| 86430 | 86030 | E3105 | Scottish National Orchestra | 1987–1991 | Freightliner Green | EWS | 06/2004 | Scrapped at C.F. Booth, Rotherham (12/2005) |
| 86430 | 86030 | E3105 | Saint Edmund | 1996–2002 | Freightliner Green | EWS | 06/2004 | Scrapped at C.F. Booth, Rotherham (12/2005) |
| 86602 | 86402 | E3170 | - | - | Freightliner Green | Freightliner | 03/2005 | Scrapped by Sandbach Car & Commercial Dismantlers at Crewe LNWR (01/2010) |
| 86603 | 86403 | E3115 | - | - | Revised Railfreight; Distribution | Freightliner | 09/1999 | Scrapped at C.F. Booth, Rotherham (11/2005) |
| 86604 | 86404 | E3103 | - | - | Freightliner Green | Freightliner | 15/01/2021 | Exported to Bulgaria |
| 86605 | 86405 | E3185 | Intercontainer | 1992–1996 | Freightliner Green | Freightliner | 05/06/2020 | Exported to Bulgaria |
| 86606 | 86406 | E3112 | - | - | Freightliner grey | Freightliner | 11/2003 | Scrapped at Ron Hull Jr, Rotherham (06/2007) |
| 86607 | 86407 | E3176 | The Institution of Electrical Engineers | 1987–2000 | Freightliner Green | Freightliner | 16/01/2021 | Exported to Bulgaria |
| 86608 | 86408; 86501 | E3180 | St. John Ambulance | 1987–1999 | Freightliner Green | Freightliner | 21/01/2021 | Exported to Bulgaria |
| 86609 | 86409 | E3102 | - | - | Freightliner Green | Freightliner | 19/01/2021 | Exported to Bulgaria |
| 86610 | 86410 | E3104 | - | - | Freightliner Green | Freightliner | 20/01/2020 | Exported to Bulgaria |
| 86611 | 86411 | E3171 | Airey Neave (Note: 86311 was named on 14 May 1983 by prime minister Margaret Thatcher at London Euston.) | 1983–2003 | Freightliner grey | Freightliner | 11/2003 | Written off in Norton Bridge accident (2003). Scrapped by HNRC at Crewe Works (02/2005) |
| 86612 | 86412 | E3122 | Elizabeth Garrett Anderson | 1983–2004 | Freightliner Green | Freightliner | 15/06/2020 | Exported to Bulgaria |
| 86613 | 86413 | E3128 | County of Lancashire | 1985–1999 | Freightliner Green | Freightliner | 09/02/2021 | Exported to Bulgaria |
| 86614 | 86414 | E3145 | Frank Hornby | 1986–2001 | Freightliner Green | Freightliner | 07/10/2020 | Exported to Bulgaria |
| 86615 | 86415 | E3123 | Rotary International | 1984–2005 | Freightliner Green | Freightliner | 04/2005 | Scrapped at Ron Hull Jr, Rotherham (07/2007) |
| 86618 | 86418 | E3163 | - | - | Freightliner grey | Freightliner | 08/2001 | Scrapped at C.F. Booth, Rotherham (03/2005) |
| 86620 | 86420 | E3114 | Philip G Walton | 1998– | Freightliner Green | Freightliner | 09/2005 | Scrapped at Ron Hull Jr, Rotherham (06/2007) |
| 86621 | 86421 | E3157 | London School of Economics | 1985–2004 | Freightliner Green | Freightliner | 04/2011 | Scrapped at Crewe LNWR (03/2013) |
| 86622 | 86422 | E3174 | - | - | Freightliner Powerhaul | Freightliner | 17/11/2020 | Exported to Bulgaria |
| 86623 | 86423 | E3152 | - | - | Freightliner grey | Freightliner | 10/2003 | Scrapped by Sandbach Car & Commercial Dismantlers at Crewe LNWR (01/2010) |
| 86627 | 86427 | E3110 | The Industrial Society | 1985–1999 | Freightliner Green | Freightliner | 28/05/2020 | Exported to Bulgaria |
| 86628 | 86428 | E3159 | Aldaniti | 1984–2004 | Freightliner Green | Freightliner | 09/07/2020 | Exported to Bulgaria |
| 86631 | 86431 | E3188 | - | - | Freightliner Green | Freightliner | 11/2003 | Written off in Norton Bridge accident (2003). Scrapped by HMRC at Crewe Works (03/2005) |
| 86632 | 86432 | E3148 | Brookside | 1987–1999 | Freightliner Green | Freightliner | 17/02/2021 | Exported to Bulgaria |
| 86633 | 86433 | E3198 | Wulfruna | 1985–2004 | Freightliner grey | Freightliner | 02/2004 | Scrapped at Crewe LNWR (03/2013) |
| 86634 | 86434 | E3187 | University of London | 1986–1999 | Freightliner Green | Freightliner | 05/2002 | Scrapped at C.F. Booth, Rotherham (03/2005) |
| 86635 | 86435 | E3124 | - | - | Freightliner Green | Freightliner | 02/2004 | Scrapped at Crewe LNWR (03/2013) |
| 86636 | 86436 | E3160 | - | - | Freightliner Green | Freightliner | 03/2000 | Scrapped at C.F. Booth, Rotherham (01/2005) |
| 86637 | 86437 | E3130 | - | - | Freightliner Powerhaul | Freightliner | 05/01/2021 | Exported to Bulgaria |
| 86638 | 86438 | E3108 | - | - | Freightliner Green | Freightliner | 21/01/2021 | Exported to Bulgaria |
| 86639 | 86439 | E3153 | - | - | Freightliner Green | Freightliner | 22/01/2021 | Exported to Bulgaria |
| 86701 | 86205 | E3129 | Orion | 2009–2015 | Colas Rail yellow & orange | Europhoenix | 12/2015 | Exported to Bulgaria. Operated by Bulmarket, renumbered to 85001. |
| 86702 | 86260 | E3144 | Cassiopeia | 2009–2015 | Electric Traction Limited Red and Grey | Europhoenix | 12/2015 | Exported to Bulgaria. Operated by Bulmarket, renumbered to 85002. |
| 86901 | 86253 | E3136 | Chief Engineer | 2005–2011 | NR Yellow | Network Rail | 03/2011 | Scrapped at Sandbach Commercial Dismantlers Ltd (06/2018) |
| 86902 | 86210 | E3190 | Rail Vehicle Engineering | 2005–2011 | NR Yellow | Network Rail | 03/2011 | Scrapped at C.F. Booth, Rotherham (11/2016). One cab preserved by a private owner. |

N.B. All locomotives numbered 86253–86261, 863xx, 864xx and 866xx were previously numbered in the 860xx series.

== Accidents ==
Over the years, several Class 86 locomotives have been involved in accidents. The most serious of these was the Watford Junction rail crash on 23 January 1975, between Bushey and Watford Junction, when no. 86209 collided head-on with Class 83 no. 83003. The Class 86 was seriously damaged after falling down an embankment, coming to rest in a field (now the site of the Colne Valley Retail Park). It was eventually recovered, several weeks later, by road. Surprisingly, given the seriousness of the incident, it was authorised for repairs and later returned to service.

Also, on 6 June 1975, numbers 86006 and 86242 were involved in the Nuneaton rail crash. The accident happened when the 23:30 sleeper from London Euston to Glasgow derailed after entering a temporary speed restriction at too high a speed, resulting in the loss of six lives. Both locomotives were later repaired.

Another serious accident was the Colwich rail crash on 19 September 1986, when nos. 86211 and 86429 were involved in a head-on collision. Both locomotives were written off and subsequently scrapped at Crewe Works over the following year.

On 8 March 1996, a Travelling Post Office train hauled by no. 86239 collided with the rear of a freight train at Stafford, writing-off the locomotive and killing two of the Royal Mail employees on board, John Thomson and Tommy Poynts.

On 16 October 2003, the Norton Bridge rail crash saw an intermodal train, hauled by nos. 86631 and 86611, collide with the rear of another stationary freight train. The force of the impact broke the leading locomotive in half, although the driver survived. 86631 was written off due to severe damage, while 86611 became a source of spares for Freightliner.

== Model railways ==
In 1981, Hornby Railways launched its first version of the Class 86 in OO gauge in BR Blue, as 86219 Phoenix. Further examples, in a variety of liveries, have since been released. The Hornby model has since been superseded by a model from Heljan, which was introduced in 2010. However, this latter model had its faults and a retooled version depicting Classes 86/4 and 86/6 was announced in 2019. Further Class 86/2 models joined the Heljan range in 2023.

In British N gauge, a model was made briefly by Lima as E3185 in electric blue livery; however, this model was too short and has not been available new for many years. A more accurate model is made by Dapol and is available in a variety of liveries. The Dapol model was introduced in 2010.
