= ScotRail (British Rail) =

British Rail brand (1983–1997)

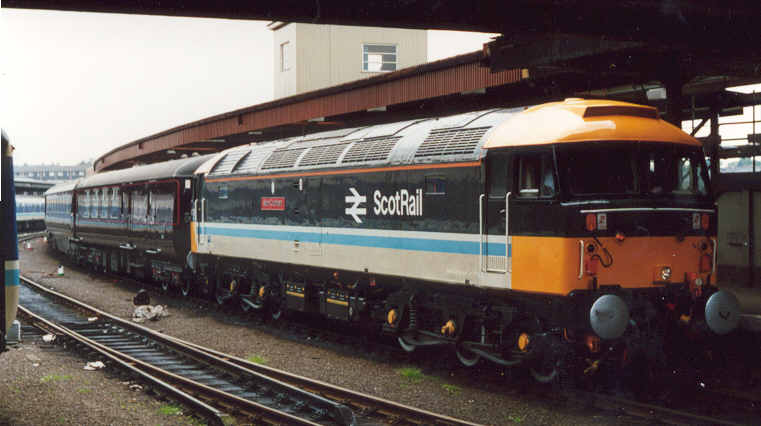
- Class 47 in ScotRail livery at York station in 1988

Overview
- Franchise: Not subject to franchising
- Main Region: Scotland
- Parent company: British Rail
- Predecessor: Regional Railways
- Successor: ScotRail (National Express)

ScotRail was the trading name providing a distinctive brand for the British Rail network in Scotland, first adopted on 22 September 1983, under manager Chris Green, British Railways Scottish Region. ScotRail was the final brand of British Rail passenger services to operate prior to the privatisation of British Rail, with the ScotRail franchise being signed over to National Express on 31 March 1997.

== Services ==
ScotRail was responsible for all passenger services that operated wholly within Scotland. It also operated services across the English border to Carlisle, and from 5 March 1988, took over operation of the Caledonian Sleeper services to London Euston. Services from south of the border via the East Coast and West Coast Main Lines remained the responsibility of InterCity.

== Infrastructure ==
The Ayrshire Coast Line was electrified in September 1986, as was the North Berwick Line in July 1991.

== Rolling stock ==
During its tenure, much of Scotland's locomotive hauled passenger carriage fleet was replaced by Class 150, Class 156 and Class 158 diesel multiple units. It also introduced cascaded Class 305s as well as new Class 318 and Class 320 electric multiple units.

Class	Image	Type	Top speed		Number	Cars	Built
Class	Image	Type	mph	km/h	Number	Cars	Built
Locomotive hauled stock
37		Diesel locomotive	90	145		N/A	1960–1965
47		Diesel locomotive	75	121	At least 12	N/A	1962–1968
86		Electric locomotive	100–110	161–177		N/A	1965–1966
87		Electric locomotive	110	177		N/A	1973–1975
Mark 1		Passenger carriage	90–100	145–161		–	1951–1963
Mark 2		Passenger carriage	100	161		–	1963–1975
Mark 2		DBSO	100	161		At least 12	1979
Mark 3		Passenger carriage	125	200			1975–1988
Diesel multiple units
101		DMU	70	113	At least 12	2, 3 or 4	1956–1960
104		DMU	70	113	A few	2, 3 or 4	1957–1959
107		DMU	70	113	26	3	1960
116		DMU	70	113	14	2 or 3	1957–1961
150 Sprinter		DMU	75	121	18	2	1986–1987
156 Super Sprinter		DMU	75	121	About 49	2	1987–1989
158 Express Sprinter		DMU	90	145	46	2	1989–1992
Electric multiple units
303		EMU	75	121	90	3	1959–1961
305		EMU	75	121	19	3 or 4	1959
311		EMU	75	121	19	3	1966–1967
314		EMU	70	113	16	3	1979
318		EMU	90	145	21	3	1985–1986
320		EMU	75	121	22	3	1990

== Liveries ==
When formed in 1983, customised versions of the existing British Rail liveries were adopted, with passenger locomotives and coaching stock painted in a lightly modified version of the InterCity Executive livery. The red stripe was replaced with a saltire blue stripe, and the InterCity name was replaced with the ScotRail name. Most locomotives carried the standard InterCity Executive livery but with ScotRail branding. Diesel and Electric multiple units carried normal versions of the Regional Railways livery. In the SPT area, rolling stock was painted in Strathclyde Orange and Black.

== See also ==
- ScotRail, the train operating company operating the ScotRail franchise since 1 April 2022
- ScotRail (brand)

Preceded by Regional Railways	Operator of Scotland passenger services 1983–1997	Succeeded by ScotRail (National Express)
