= MK5 =

MK5 may refer to:

- Mortal Kombat: Deadly Alliance, the fifth game in the Mortal Kombat series
- Mario Kart DS, the fifth game in the Mario Kart series, released in 2005 for the Nintendo DS
- MK5, an English postcode district
- British Rail Mark 5, a rolling stock designation in the United Kingdom
- British Rail Mark 5A, a similar development of rolling stock in the United Kingdom
