= Polmadie TRSMD =

Railway maintenance depot in Glasgow, Scotland

Polmadie T&RSMD
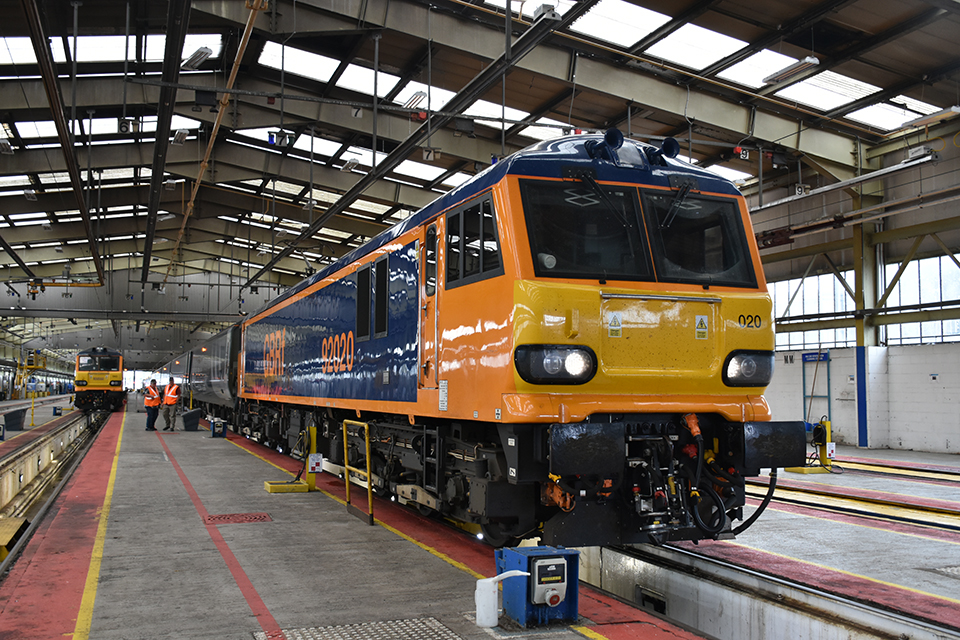
- Caledonian Sleeper at Polmadie depot (2019)
- Interactive map of Polmadie T&RSMD

Location
- Location: Polmadie, Glasgow, Scotland
- Coordinates: 55°50′7″N 4°14′13″W

Characteristics
- Owner: Alstom
- Depot code: PC (Carriage); PO (1973-present); PP (Eurostar)
- Type: DMU, EMU
- Rolling stock: Class 220 Voyager; Class 221 Super Voyager; Class 390 Pendolino; Class 397 Civity; Mark 5 coaches
- Routes served: West Coast Main Line, East Coast Main Line

History
- Opened: 1879
- Original: Caledonian Railway
- Post-grouping: London, Midland & Scottish Railway
- Former depot code: 66A (1948-72)

Depot entrance from the West Coast Main Line (2006)

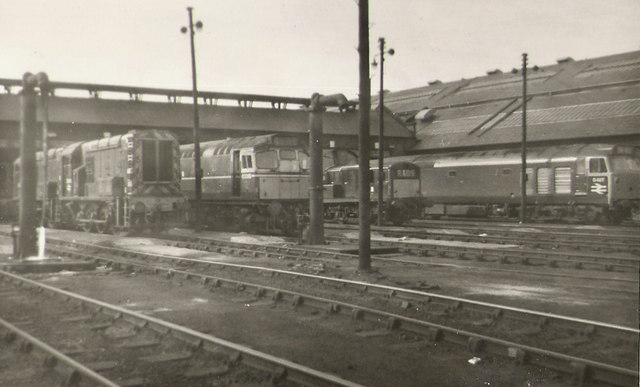
Locomotives at Polmadie depot (1968)

Polmadie Traction and Rolling Stock Maintenance Depot (T&RSMD), also known as Polmadie Depot, Polmadie Traction Depot and Polmadie Carriage Maintenance Depot (Glasgow) is a railway maintenance depot on the West Coast Main Line, in the Polmadie district of Glasgow, Scotland.

== History ==
Polmadie depot was built in 1879 by the Caledonian Railway.

== The site today ==
The depot is owned and operated by Alstom, which maintains Avanti West Coast's fleet of Class 390 Pendolinos.

The facility is also used for daytime storage, maintenance and cleaning of CrossCountry and Caledonian Sleeper rolling stock.
