= British Rail Mark 5 =

Railway carriages used by Caledonian sleeper

British Rail Mark 5 (CAF)
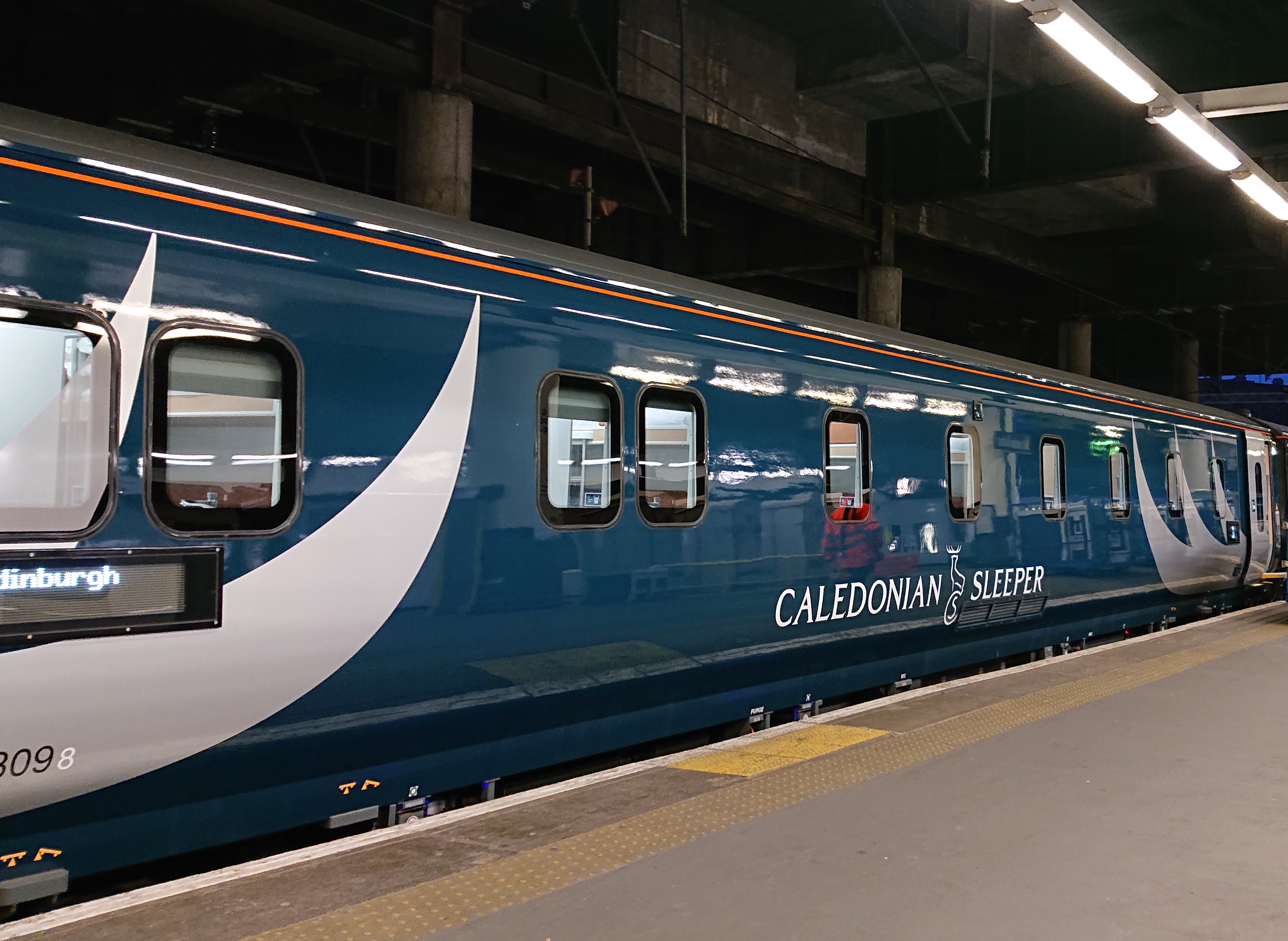
- CAF Mk5 sleeper coach
- In service: 2019
- Manufacturer: CAF
- Built at: Beasain
- Replaced: Sleeper Either Class
- Constructed: 2016 - 2018
- Number built: 75
- Operators: Caledonian Sleeper
- Lines served: West Coast Main Line

Specifications
- Car body construction: Fully integral aluminium monocoque
- Car length: 22.2 m (72 ft 10 in)
- Width: 2.75 m (9 ft 0 in)
- Doors: Hinged plug
- Maximum speed: 125 mph (201 km/h)
- Weight: max. tare 43 t (42 long tons; 47 short tons)
- Braking system(s): Cheek mounted discs
- Track gauge: 1,435 mm (4 ft 8 1/2 in) standard gauge

Notes/references
- Sourced from unless otherwise noted.

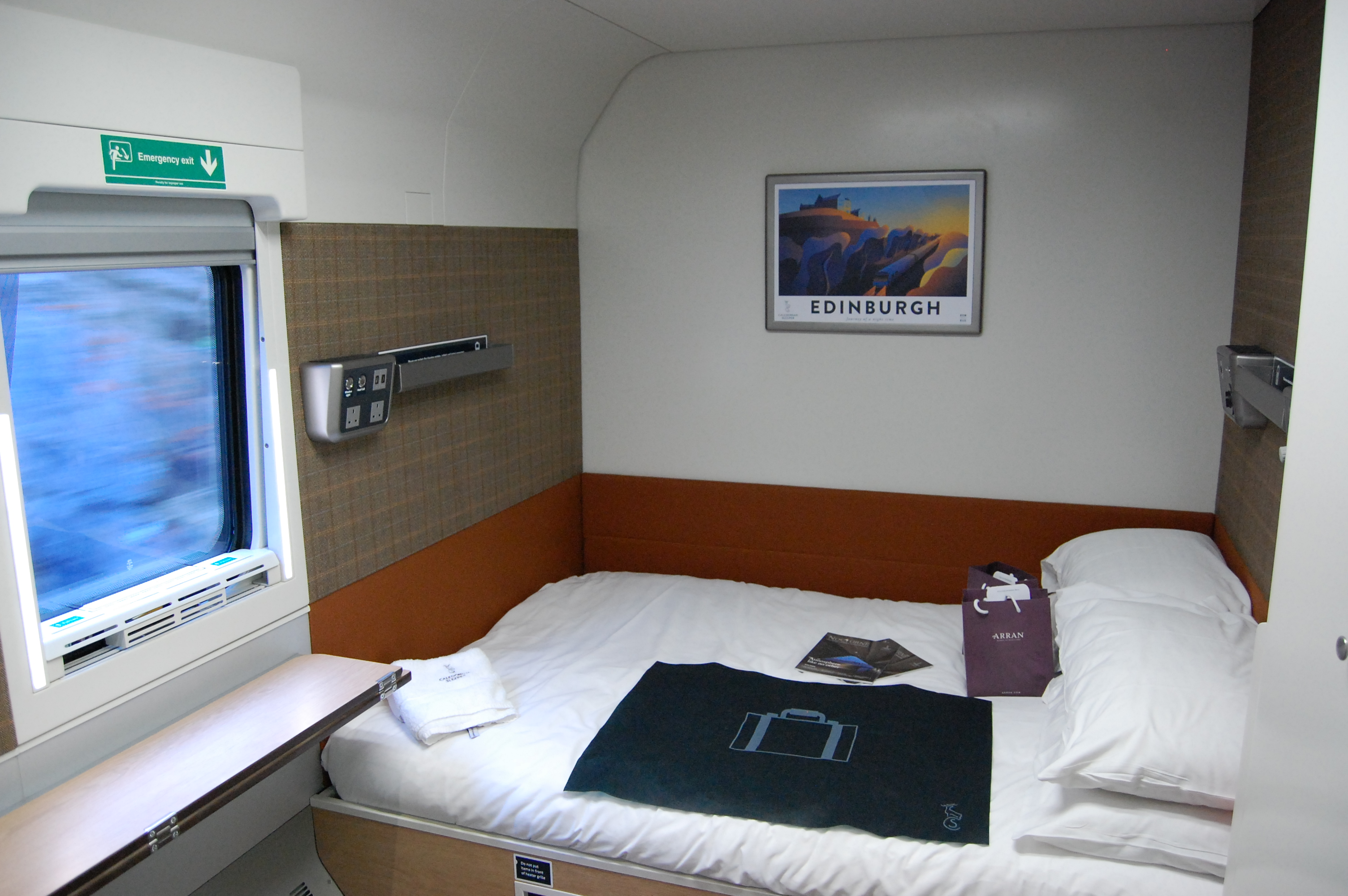
Sleeping suite.

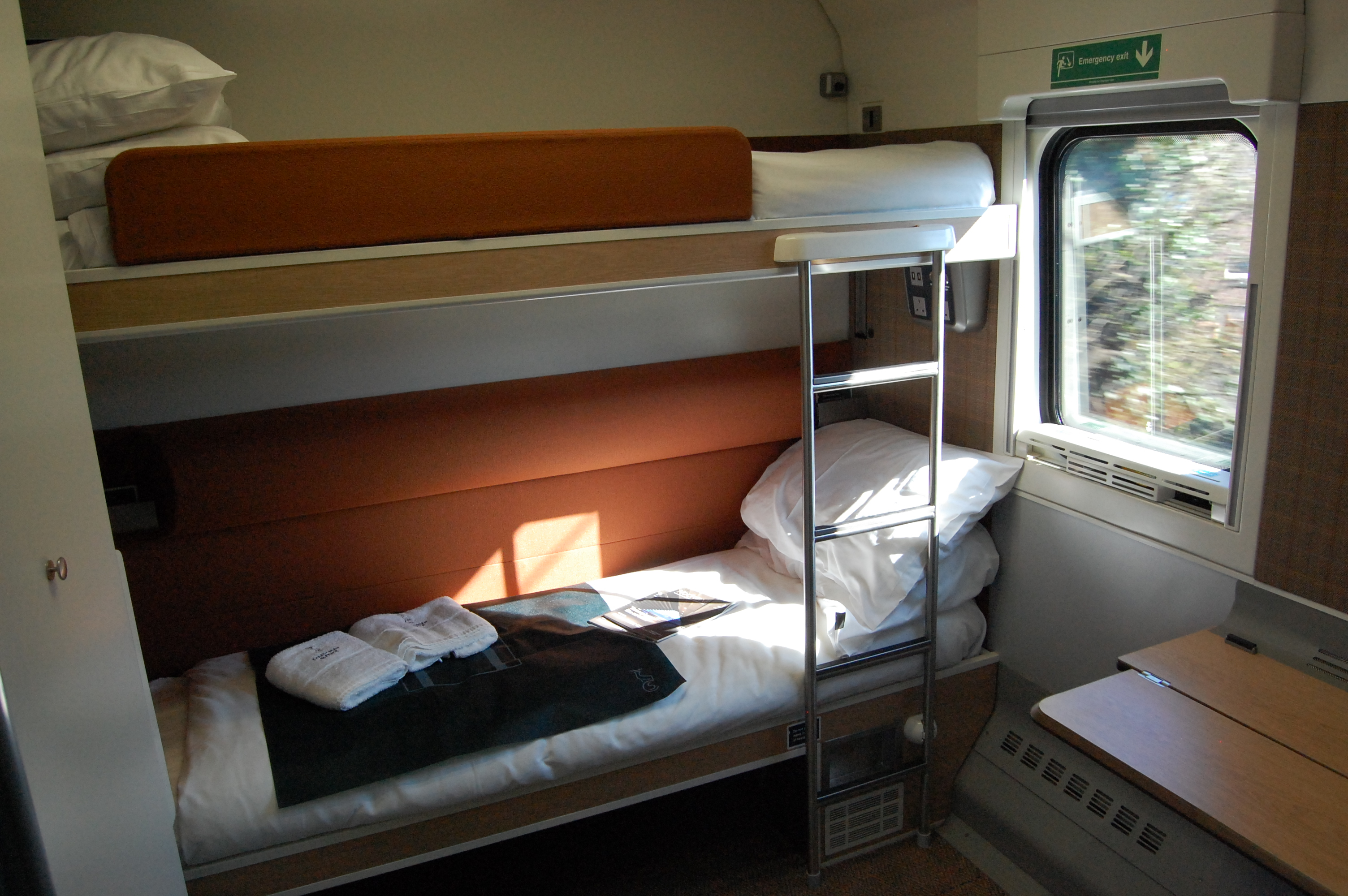
Accessible room.

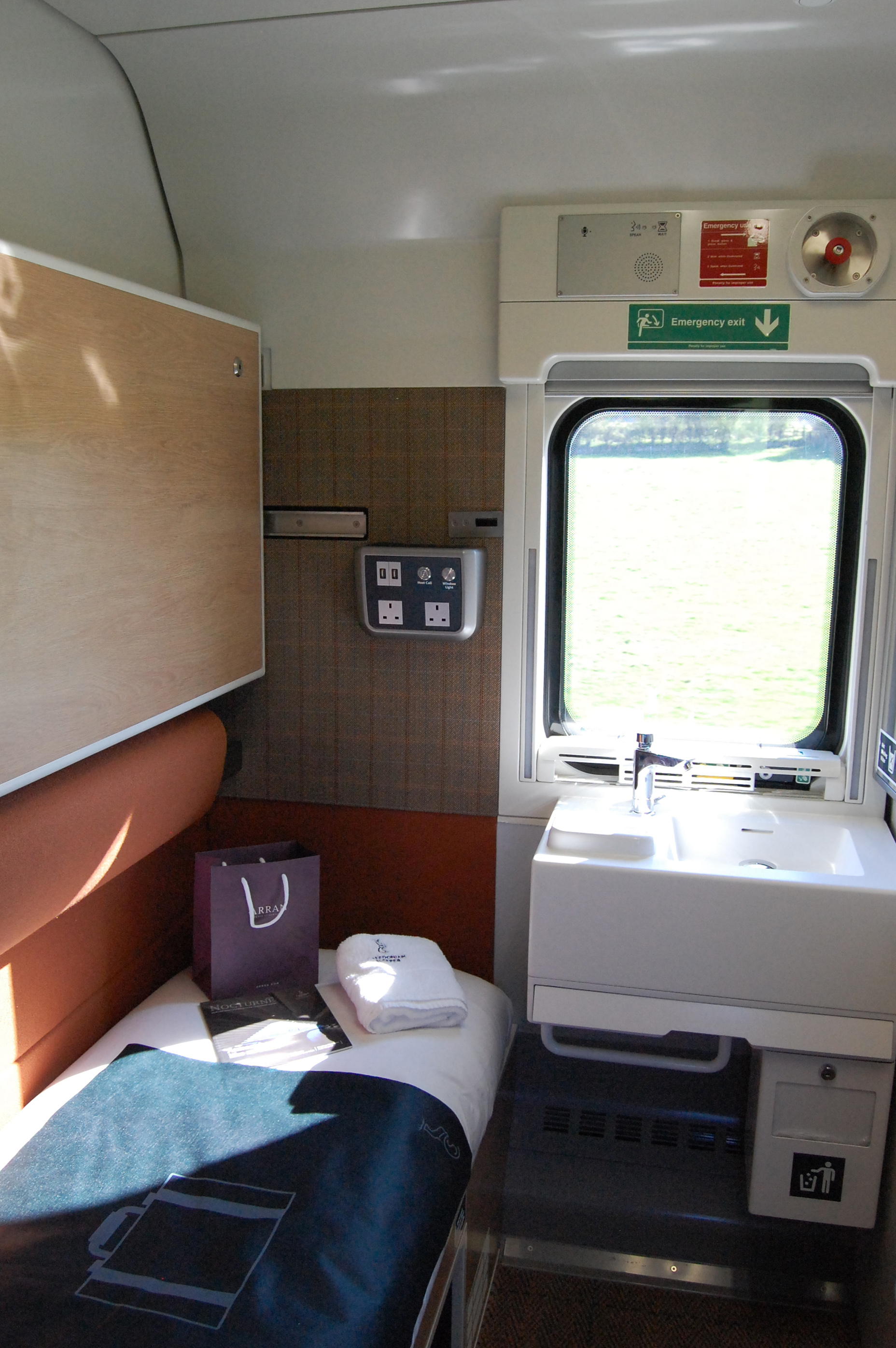
Club room.

The British Rail Mark 5 is the designation given to locomotive-hauled rail carriages built by Spanish manufacturer CAF for operation with Caledonian Sleeper.

== Description ==
In 2015, the Caledonian Sleeper service, which had formed part of the ScotRail franchise, was split into a separate operation, with Serco as the new franchise operator. As part of the franchise agreement, Serco was committed to procuring new rolling stock to replace the operation's existing fleet of Mark 2 and Mark 3 passenger coaches. In February 2015, Serco signed a €200 million deal with CAF to purchase 75 coaches of five different types. These are formed into a total of four 16-coach trains (London Euston to Fort William, Inverness and Aberdeen, London Euston to Edinburgh and Glasgow, plus the two respective return services), plus two coaches for Fort William-Edinburgh-Fort William, with nine coaches as spares, and are hauled by Class 92 locomotives between London and Glasgow/Edinburgh, and Class 73s on unelectrified routes.

The new vehicles are the first new locomotive-hauled passenger coaches introduced onto the British network since the Mark 4 vehicles on the East Coast Main Line as part of the InterCity 225 sets in 1989–1992. The first five coaches began testing on the Velim railway test circuit in the Czech Republic in August 2017, before being delivered to Polmadie TRSMD in January 2018. Mark 5 coaches commenced operating the London to Edinburgh and Glasgow services in April 2019, with the remainder converted in October 2019.

== Specifications ==
In accordance with the Scottish Government Caledonian Sleeper franchise agreement, Serco's order for purpose-built sleeper rolling stock from CAF originally specified six different types of vehicles to accommodate onboard services and accommodation types. These included a separate lounge car, seated car, hybrid pod / sleeper car, pod car, PRM sleeper car, and regular sleeper car. However, due to safety concerns later arising over aircraft style "pod" seating being incompatible with railway crash worthiness regulations, Serco opted to modify the Mk5 order by requesting that both dedicated and hybrid pod coaches instead be constructed as regular sleeping vehicles.

Club Car (CC)

There are a total of 11 lounge vehicles. Each has the following features:

- Dining space for up to 30 passengers, including two wheelchair spaces
- Seven restaurant-style dining booths; two of which include 180 degree seating for five passengers, two with a capacity for four passengers, three for two passengers each including one for wheelchair users.
- Seven stools for solo travellers, with swivel function to face diagonally into the direction of travel.
- One galley with fully operational kitchen

Seated Car (SC)

There are a total of 11 seated vehicles. Each has the following features:

- Capacity of 30 'Comfort Seats' in 2 × 1 formation: with additional space for two wheelchairs
- Window blinds and power modules at each seat, equipped with plug and USB sockets, reading lights, and manual seat reclining
- Universal Access PRM compliant toilet
- Overhead lockable storage above each comfort seat
- Dedicated lockable large luggage storage shelves
- Guard's office

Sleeper Car (SLC)

There are a total of 41 regular sleeper vehicles. Each have the following features:

- Six club single bed, en-suite shower and toilet rooms
- Four classic single bed, non-ensuite rooms
- One toilet or one steward office

Accessible Car PRM (ACC)

There are a total of 12 PRM compliant sleeper vehicles. Each have the following features:

- One accessible Caledonian double bed room, adjacent to (non-ensuite) Universal Access toilet, but with no access to a shower.
- Two Caledonian double bed, en-suite shower and toilet rooms.
- Two Classic single bed, non-ensuite rooms.
- One accessible Classic single bed accessible room, adjacent to (non-ensuite) Universal Access toilet, but with no access to a shower.
- Two Universal Access PRM compliant toilets – one at each end of the carriage.

Every room in both sleeping vehicle types, with the exception of Caledonian Double rooms, is equipped for both single and shared bunk bed occupancy.

Summary and numbering
Type	Seats/berths	Builder	Numbers
Sleeper Seated Carriage with Brake	31	CAF Irun 2016–18	15001–11
Sleeper Lounge Car	30 or 28	CAF Beasain 2016–18	15101–10
Sleeping Car (Fully Accessible)	6	CAF Castejon/Irun 2016–18	15201–14
Sleeping Car	10	CAF Beasain 2016–18	15301–40

== Formations ==
The typical formation of the new trains in service is the same as the previous formation:

Highlander Formation

- 4-6 coaches - Edinburgh Waverley to Fort William
- 4-6 coaches - Edinburgh Waverley to Aberdeen
- 7-8 coaches - Edinburgh Waverley to Inverness
- 16 coaches - London Euston to Edinburgh Waverley (Full Portion)

Lowlander Formation

- 8 coaches - Carstairs to Edinburgh Waverley
- 8 coaches - Carstairs to Glasgow Central
- 16 coaches - London Euston to Carstairs (Full Portion)

The formation of Highland Sleeper portions north of Edinburgh is frequently re-adjusted between various lengths in accordance with demand. The Fort William portion has lounge and seated coaches detached from sleeping coaches at Edinburgh when heading southbound, and re-attached to sleeper coaches at Edinburgh when heading northbound. All sleeper portions on both Highland and Lowland services in both directions, with the exception of the Fort William portion, each include one seated carriage and one lounge carriage for the whole journey.
