= Caledonian Sleeper =

Overnight sleeper trains between London and Scotland

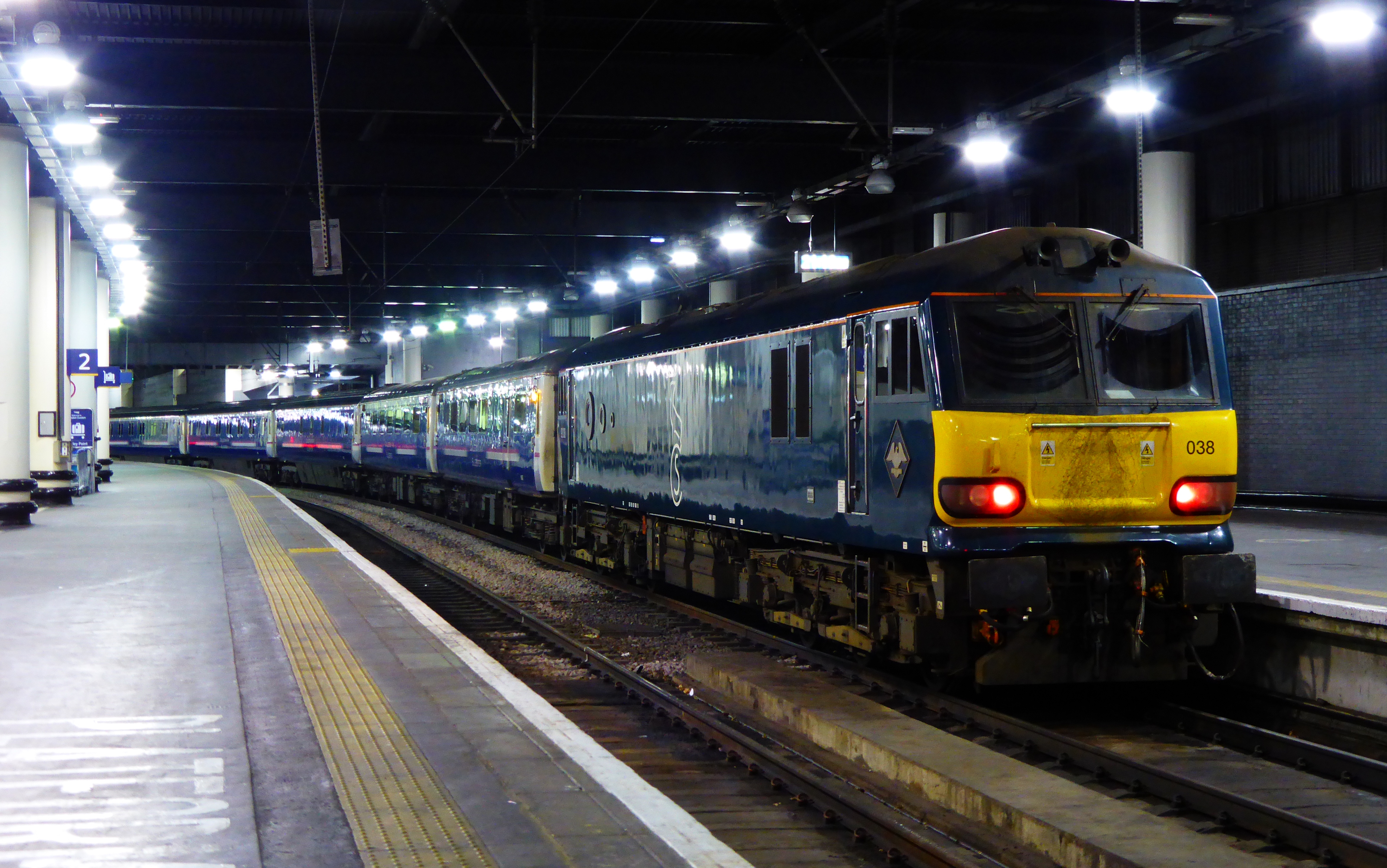
- Caledonian Sleeper in Serco livery, at Euston

Overview
- Franchises: Part of ScotRail (31 March 1997 – 30 March 2015); Standalone franchise (31 March 2015 – present)
- Main regions: Greater London; South East England; North West England; Scotland
- Fleet: Class 67; Class 73; Class 92; Mark 5 carriages
- Stations called at: 48
- Parent company: Scottish Rail Holdings
- Headquarters: Inverness, Scotland
- Reporting mark: CS

Other
- Website: www.sleeper.scot
Route map

Caledonian Sleeper is an overnight sleeper train service between London and Scotland, in the United Kingdom. It is one of only two currently operating sleeper services in the UK – the other being the Night Riviera, which runs between London and Penzance.

A sleeper service has been run along the West Coast Main Line since 24 February 1873. Sleepers were historically run on the rival East Coast Main Line as well; however, all remaining sleeper services that ran on the east coast routes were withdrawn in May 1988. While InterCity continued to operate what would later become known as the Caledonian Sleeper, it decided to remove all seating accommodation on its remaining sleeper services during the mid-1990s. The Anglo-Scottish sleeper services were transferred to ScotRail on 5 March 1995; as a consequence of the privatisation of British Rail, on 31 March 1997, the service was privatised as a part of the wider ScotRail franchise, initially being operated by National Express. Seated Mark 2 carriages were re-added to the service alongside the Mark 3 sleeping cars, the latter were also refurbished, from January 2000.

On 17 October 2004, the ScotRail franchise and thus the Caledonian Sleeper, was transferred to FirstGroup. Since April 2015, the Caledonian Sleeper has been structured as a standalone franchise. It was operated by Serco under the supervision of the Scottish Government. As a part of its successful bid, Serco had pledged to invest £100 million into the service, which was to be spent on, amongst other things, procuring new rolling stock. During 2019, a new fleet of Mark 5 carriages were introduced, replacing the British Rail-era carriages. These are hauled by a combination of Class 92 electric locomotives (on electrified sections only) and rebuilt Class 73/9s electro-diesel locomotives; prior traction withdrawn in 2019 included Class 67, Class 87 and Class 90 locomotives.

Two services depart London Euston each night from Sunday to Friday and travel via the West Coast Main Line to Scotland. The earlier Highland Sleeper service divides at Edinburgh into portions for Aberdeen, Fort William and Inverness. The later Lowland Sleeper service travels to Edinburgh and Glasgow, splitting at Carstairs. Five London-bound portions depart from these destinations each night, combining into two trains at Edinburgh and Carstairs. As of January 2026 the Highland Sleeper service now also calls at Birmingham International.

Serco's contract concluded early in June 2023, and the service was taken into state ownership by Transport Scotland. It is a subsidiary of Scottish Rail Holdings.

== Anglo-Scottish sleepers up to 1996 ==
In February 1873, the North British Railway revealed the first sleeping car in Britain. It had been built by the Ashbury Carriage Company and was displayed at Glasgow, Edinburgh and London King's Cross. It became the first sleeping carriage used on British railways when it made a revenue earning trip on 24 February 1873 attached to a train at Glasgow for King's Cross via the East Coast Main Line.

On 1 October 1873, the rival Caledonian Railway introduced a London and North Western Railway sleeping car on mail trains three days per week between Glasgow Buchanan Street and London Euston via the West Coast Main Line. The service ran from Glasgow on Tuesdays, Thursdays and Saturdays, and from London on Mondays, Wednesdays and Fridays. An extra charge of ten shillings was made for a sleeping berth.

Sleeping car services were operated on both the west and east coast routes to multiple destinations for over a century, even under the nationalised railway operator British Rail. During 1976, services from King's Cross ran to Edinburgh and Aberdeen, and from Euston to Glasgow Central, Perth, Inverness, Stranraer Harbour, and Fort William. There was also a service from Bristol Temple Meads to Glasgow and Edinburgh via the West Coast route. However, sleeper services declined in number during the latter half of the 20th century. During November 1987, it was announced that the last of the sleeper services running on the East Coast routes was to be withdrawn in May 1988.

At one point, InterCity was planning to remove all seating accommodation on its remaining sleeper services from May 1992. However, it instead concluded a deal with the British transport conglomerate Stagecoach that saw the Mark 2 seating carriages retailed beyond this point. This was only a temporary reprieve however, as the Stagecoach carriages were withdrawn after 12 months.

On 5 March 1995, responsibility for operation of the Anglo-Scottish services was transferred within British Rail from InterCity West Coast to ScotRail. During the mid-1990s, British Rail had proposed to cease operating the Fort William portion of the service, however, the Highland Regional Council successfully sought a stay pending a formal consultation, after the Scottish Court of Session ruled that the correct service closure process had not been followed. Eventually, British Rail agreed to retain the Fort William portion, albeit with a reduction four sleeping carriages to only one. During 1995, the associated motorail service was withdrawn without reprieve.

== The Caledonian Sleeper ==
=== ScotRail ===
On 4 June 1996, the overnight service was relaunched under the Caledonian Sleeper brand. Each portion of the service was assigned its own identity, with the Night Caledonian to Glasgow, Night Scotsman to Edinburgh, Night Aberdonian to Aberdeen, Royal Highlander to Inverness and West Highlander to Fort William. On 31 March 1997, it became part of the ScotRail franchise which was initially operated by National Express. The service continued to be operated using the same Mark 3 sleeping cars that had been operated by British Rail, but there were no suitable locomotives immediately available. Accordingly, the short-term hiring of locomotives from the West Coast operator Virgin Trains was implemented. The arrangement continued until March 1998, at which point the freight operator English, Welsh and Scottish Railway (EWS) took on the contract.

Starting in January 2000, seated carriages were added to the sleeping cars; these were 11 former Virgin Trains Mark 2 carriages that had been refurbished at Wolverton Works, which included the installation of first class-style reclining seats throughout. In parallel with this work, the sleeping cars were also refurbished, during which time they were repainted with ScotRail's purple and blue livery.

On 17 October 2004, the ScotRail franchise, including the Caledonian Sleeper service, was transferred to FirstGroup. In spite of this transfer, both the rolling stock and locomotive contracts remained fundamentally unchanged, except for the carriages and three of EWS's Class 90 locomotives being repainted in FirstGroup's corporate blue, pink and white livery.

=== Serco ===
During 2012, the Scottish Government announced that as part of the reletting of the ScotRail franchise from April 2015, the Caledonian Sleeper would be operated by a separate franchise. In June 2013, Transport Scotland announced Arriva, FirstGroup and Serco had been shortlisted to bid for the new franchise. During May 2014, the franchise was awarded to Serco; at the time, the company pledged to invest £100 million in new trains that would include 'en suite' rooms and a new style of club car. Accordingly, the existing Mark 2 and Mark 3 coaching stock was to be replaced, originally set to occur by 2018. On 31 March 2015, Serco Caledonian Sleepers took over the operation of the service.

In late December 2015, staff called for a two-day strike because of health and safety concerns with the trains then in use and Serco's alleged failure to address them appropriately. In September 2019, another three-day strike was held after negotiations between the RMT and Serco broke down over claims of poor staffing levels and insufficient training.

By mid-2020, the Caledonian Sleeper had considerably curtailed its services in response to the significant decline of passenger travel amid the COVID-19 pandemic.

In late 2021, the Caledonian Sleeper was subject to further strikes over allegations of bullying and harassment of staff. It was also one of many train operators impacted by the 2022–2024 United Kingdom railway strikes, which were the first national rail strikes in the UK for three decades. Its workers were among those participating in industrial action due to a dispute over pay and working conditions. Caledonian Sleeper trains were cancelled on the days of the strikes.

In October 2022, the Scottish Government announced the franchise run by Serco would be terminated. The service was taken over by Scottish Rail Holdings on 25 June 2023.

== Current operations ==
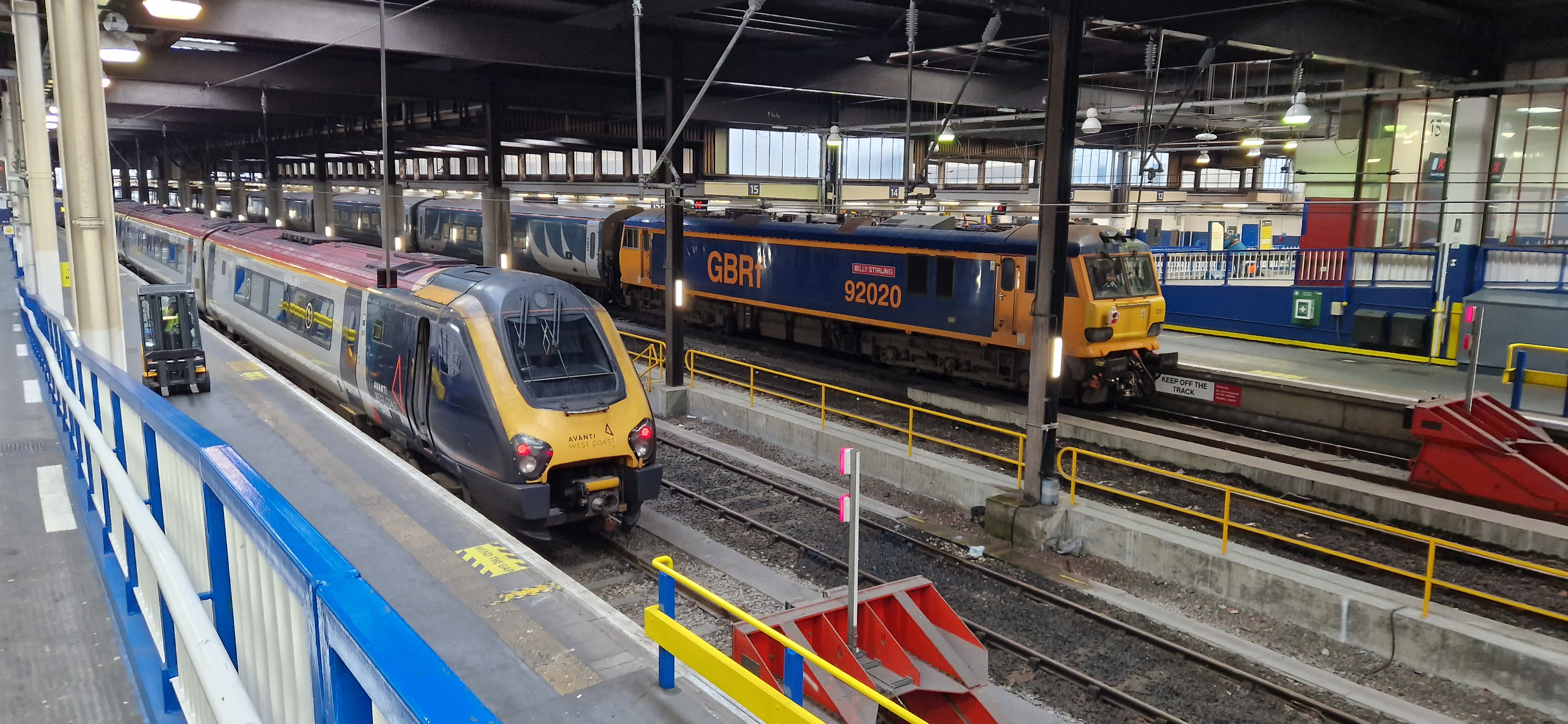
Caledonian Sleeper Class 92 (right) Avanti West Coast Class 221 at London Euston in 2023

Two trains are operated on six nights each week (not Saturday night/Sunday morning).

- The Highland Sleeper has three portions that serve routes to Aberdeen, Inverness and Fort William.
- The Lowland Sleeper has two portions serving routes to Edinburgh Waverley and Glasgow Central.

The trains normally operate at a maximum speed of 80 mph (130 km/h), but are authorised to travel at 100 mph (160 km/h) where line speeds permit if the train has been delayed by more than 20 minutes.

Trains use the West Coast Main Line between Scotland and London, using London Euston as their terminus. Sunday services are sometimes diverted via the East Coast Main Line when the West Coast route is closed for engineering work. In these cases, they still use London Euston except when the station itself is closed, or there is no possible routing into the station during engineering works, in which case they use nearby London King's Cross instead.

Lounges for Caledonian Sleeper customers are available at Dundee, Fort William, Inverness, Leuchars, Perth and Stirling stations, and passengers may also use lounges shared with other operators at Aberdeen, Edinburgh Waverley, Glasgow Central and London Euston.

=== Highland Sleeper ===
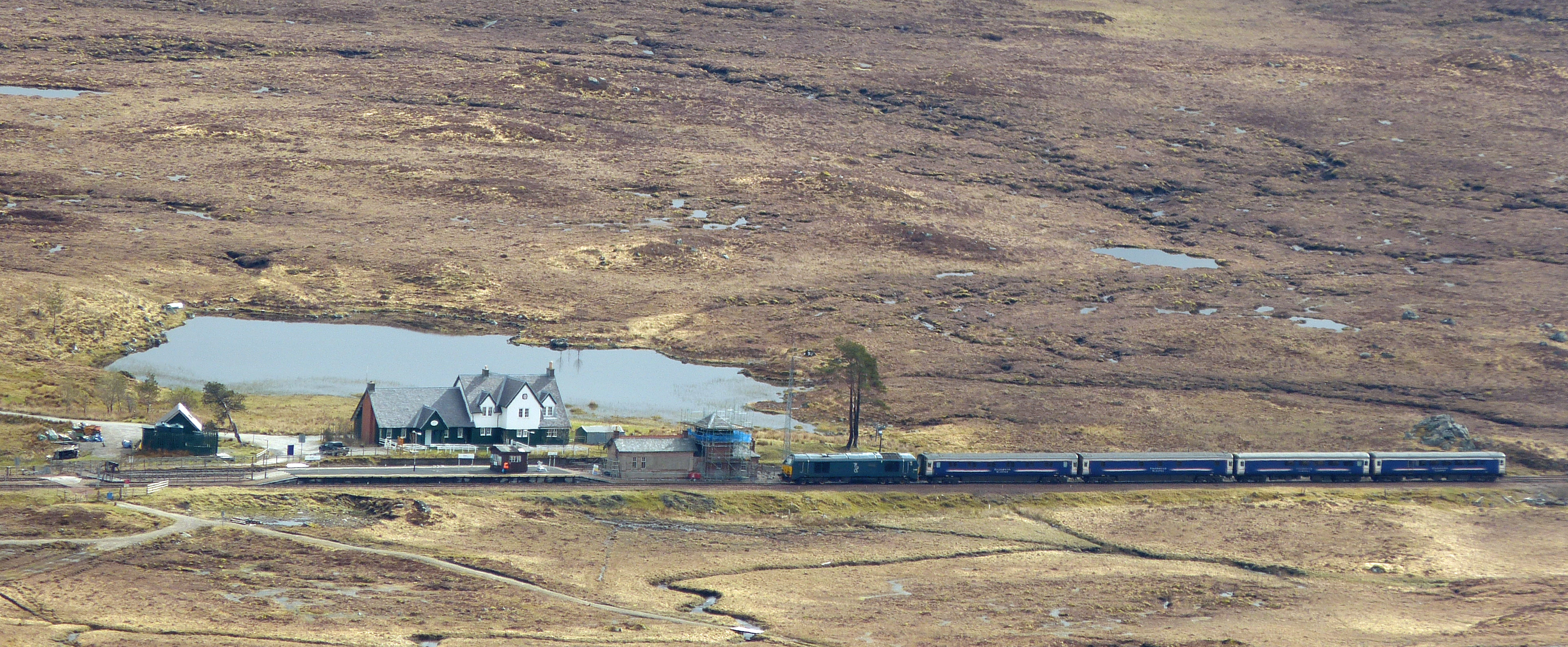
The portion for Fort William at Corrour behind a Class 67 in 2015

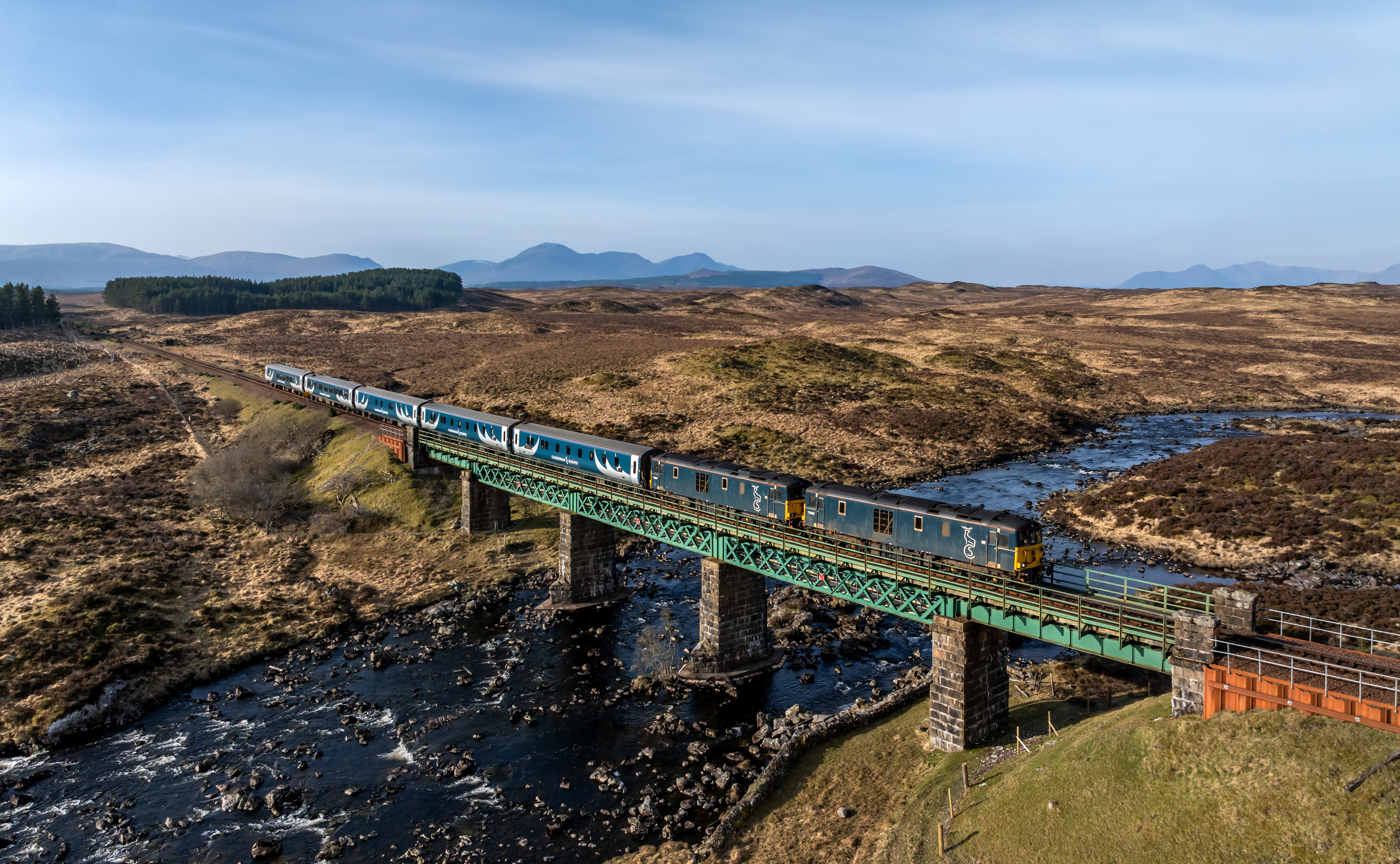
The Highland Sleeper crossing the Gaur Viaduct between Bridge of Orchy and Rannoch hauled by 2 Class 73s in 2025

The northbound Highland Sleeper leaves London Euston at 21:15 (20:59 on Sundays), stops at Crewe and Preston to pick up passengers, and arrives at Edinburgh Waverley approximately six-and-a-half hours after leaving London. The train for this leg of the journey is formed of 16 carriages and is hauled by an electric Class 92 locomotive.

At Edinburgh Waverley, the train is divided into three portions before continuing further north as separate services:

- to Fort William (front portion) (Note: The front set of the train as it leaves London; this becomes the rear set at Edinburgh, since all three portions reverse at the station.)
- to Aberdeen (middle portion) and
- to Inverness (rear portion) (Note: The rear set of the train as it leaves London; this becomes the front set at Edinburgh, since all three portions reverse at the station.)

The Class 92 is uncoupled and replaced by a Class 73/9 diesel locomotive for each of the three northbound sets. These services arrive at their respective destinations the following morning.

Similarly, going southbound, three separate services depart from Aberdeen, Inverness and Fort William in the evening, hauled by a Class 73/9 locomotive up to Edinburgh. These trains are then combined to form one train at Edinburgh Waverley; the diesel locomotives are detached from each portion and the Class 92 is attached to take the full-length, 16-car train to London. The train continues, with intermediate stops at Preston and Crewe for alighting passengers only, and arrives in London Euston the following morning.

The Inverness portion of the train consists of six sleeper coaches, one seated carriage and one "club car" (lounge car), all running through to/from London. The Aberdeen set consists of between two and four sleeper coaches (depending on demand) plus one seated carriage and one lounge car, all running throughout. The Fort William set consists only of two to four sleeper coaches between London and Edinburgh; the seated and lounge carriages are attached/detached at Edinburgh Waverley for the Edinburgh–Fort William leg of the journey. This means that any seated passengers travelling between England and stations on the Fort William route are required to use the seated carriages intended for Inverness or Aberdeen, and change carriages at Edinburgh Waverley.

In October 2025, it was announced that from 15 January 2026, the Caledonian Sleeper Aberdeen, Inverness and Fort William services will travel to and from London via Birmingham International station in the West Midlands.

Highland Caledonian Sleeper
Route	Calling at
London Euston – Fort William	Birmingham International; Crewe; Preston; Edinburgh Waverley; Glasgow Queen Street; Dalmuir; Dumbarton Central; Helensburgh Upper; Garelochhead; Arrochar and Tarbet; Ardlui (Note: Request stop); Crianlarich; Upper Tyndrum; Bridge of Orchy; Rannoch; Corrour; Tulloch; Roy Bridge; Spean Bridge
London Euston – Aberdeen	Birmingham International; Crewe; Preston; Edinburgh Waverley; Inverkeithing; Kirkcaldy; Leuchars; Dundee; Carnoustie; Arbroath; Montrose; Stonehaven
London Euston – Inverness	Birmingham International; Crewe; Preston; Edinburgh Waverley; Falkirk Grahamston (southbound only); Stirling; Dunblane; Gleneagles; Perth; Dunkeld & Birnam; Pitlochry; Blair Atholl; Dalwhinnie; Newtonmore; Kingussie; Aviemore; Carrbridge (northbound only)

=== Lowland Sleeper ===
Going northbound, the Lowland Sleeper departs London Euston at 23:50 (23:30 on Sundays), calling at Watford Junction to pick up passengers. The train then continues with no intermediate calls until Carlisle before reaching Carstairs. Here the train divides into two portions: the front eight carriages continue to Glasgow Central with one intermediate stop at Motherwell, while the rear eight carriages reverse at Carstairs and continue non-stop to Edinburgh Waverley, both portions arriving at their respective destinations the following morning. Carlisle, Carstairs and Motherwell are all served for alighting passengers only.

Similarly, in the southbound direction, two separate services depart both Glasgow Central (calling at Motherwell) and Edinburgh Waverley, and combine into one at Carstairs. The train then calls at Carlisle, before running non-stop through to Watford Junction (served for alighting passengers only) and terminating at London Euston the next morning. Motherwell, Carstairs and Carlisle are all served to pick up passengers only.

Lowland Caledonian Sleeper
Route	Calling at
London Euston – Glasgow Central	Watford Junction; Carlisle; Carstairs; Motherwell
London Euston – Edinburgh Waverley	Watford Junction; Carlisle; Carstairs

== Rolling stock ==
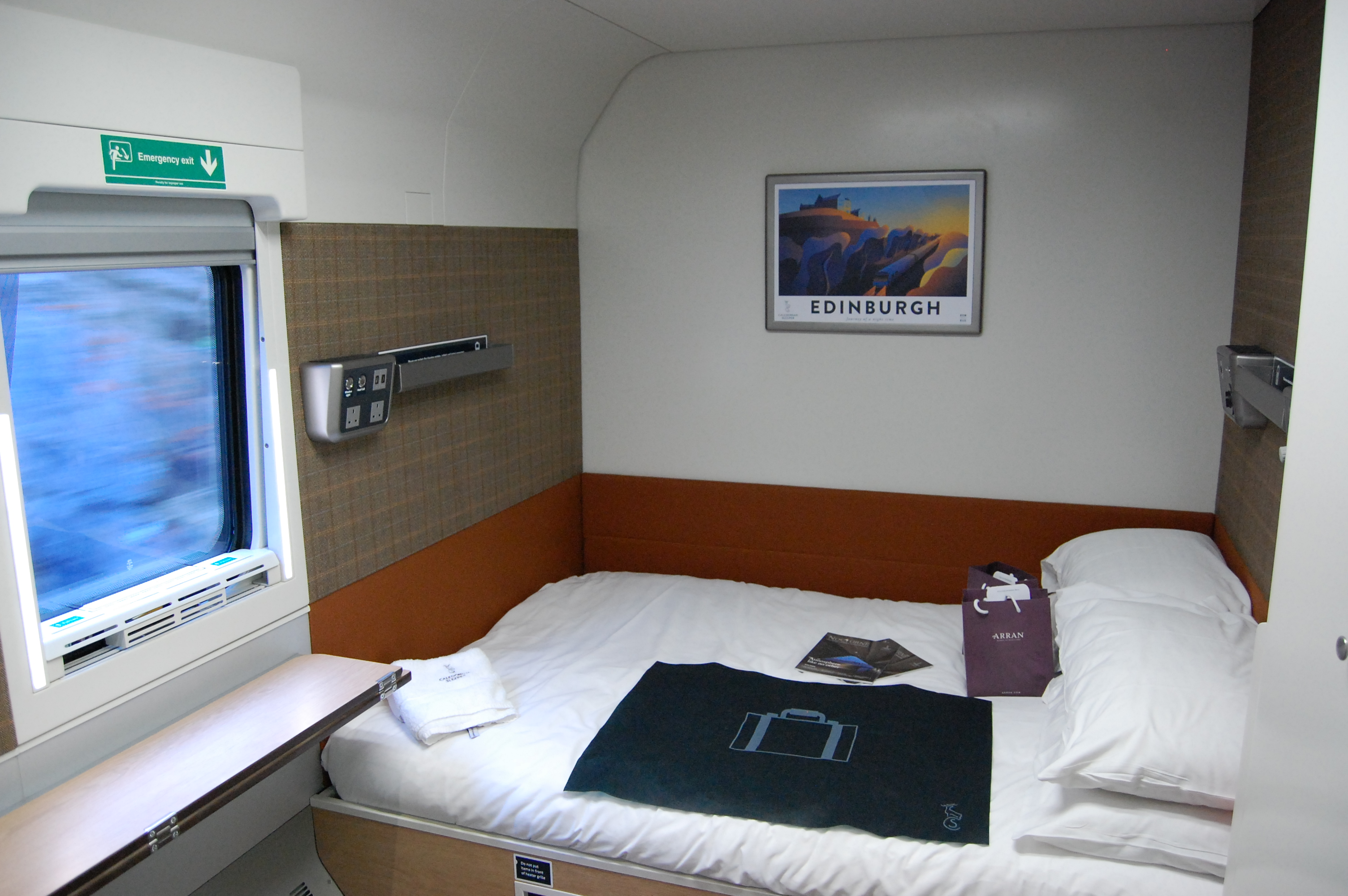
Suite in a Mark 5 sleeping car.

The ScotRail franchise inherited the coaches used by British Rail; Mark 3 sleeping coaches and Mark 2 seated carriages, some of which were fitted out as lounge cars where refreshments could be obtained. During 2019, these were replaced by Mark 5 carriages; the new rolling stock was first operated on the Lowland services from April, and subsequently on the Highland services from October. Heavy maintenance on the carriage stock was performed at Inverness TMD until April 2015, when the work was contracted out to Alstom and transferred to Polmadie Traction and Rolling Stock Maintenance Depot.

Two types of motive power are used for the Caledonian Sleeper. On the electrified routes between Glasgow/Edinburgh and London electric locomotives haul the trains. There were none of these included in the ScotRail franchises, instead they contracted Virgin Trains to provide Class 87s. In March 1998, these were replaced by English, Welsh and Scottish Railway (EWS) Class 90s.

As of 2015, Serco has a contract with GB Railfreight who use Class 92s. However, due to mechanical problems, a Class 90 locomotive was used, initially hired from DB Cargo UK, but later changed to Freightliner. From 2015 until 2019, AC Locomotive Group heritage Class 86s and 87s were used to move empty carriages in London and Glasgow and occasionally operated the overnight passenger services.

On the unelectrified routes in Scotland, the trains were hauled by EWS Class 37s to Fort William and 47s to Aberdeen and Inverness until June 2001 when Class 67s began to replace the Class 47. The Class 67 units were also used on the Fort William route from June 2006. Four locomotives were fitted with cast iron brakes and restricted to 80 mph (130 km/h) for this additional service. When GB Railfreight started to provide the trains and crews for the Serco franchise in 2015, it was planned to use rebuilt Class 73/9s. The first of these came into service in February 2016.

=== Current fleet ===
Class	Image	Type	Top speed		Fleet size	Usage	Built	Notes
Class	Image	Type	mph	km/h	Fleet size	Usage	Built	Notes
67		Diesel-electric locomotive	125	200	2	Edinburgh - Aberdeen/Fort William/Inverness	1999-2000	Hired from GB Railfreight.
73/9		Electro-diesel locomotive	90	145	6	Edinburgh - Aberdeen/Fort William/Inverness	1962, 1965–1967 (Rebuilt 2014–2017)	Hired from GB Railfreight.
92		Electric locomotive	87	140	7	London - Glasgow/Edinburgh	1993–1996	Hired from GB Railfreight.
Mark 5		Passenger carriage	100	161	75	Full network	2016–2018	

=== Past fleet ===
Former train types operated by Caledonian Sleeper include:

Class	Image	Type	Top speed		Fleet Size	Usage	Built	Left fleet
Class	Image	Type	mph	km/h	Fleet Size	Usage	Built	Left fleet
37/4		Diesel-electric locomotive	90	140		Edinburgh - Fort William	1960–1965	2006
67		Diesel-electric locomotive	125	200		Edinburgh - Inverness	1999–2000	2019
86		Electric locomotive	110	177	2	London - Edinburgh/Glasgow Sleeper Portions. Empty Coaching Stock (London - Wembley)	October 1965	2019
86		Electric locomotive	100	161	2	London - Edinburgh/Glasgow Sleeper Portions. Empty Coaching Stock (London - Wembley)	January 1966	2019
87		Electric locomotive	110	177	1	London - Edinburgh/Glasgow Sleeper Portions. Empty Coaching Stock (London - Wembley)	June 1973	2019
90		Electric locomotive	110	177	-	London - Glasgow/Edinburgh	1987–1990	2019
Mark 2		Lounge car Seated coach	100	160	22	Full Network	1969–1974	2019
Mark 3		Sleeping car	125	200	53	Full Network	1975–1988	2019

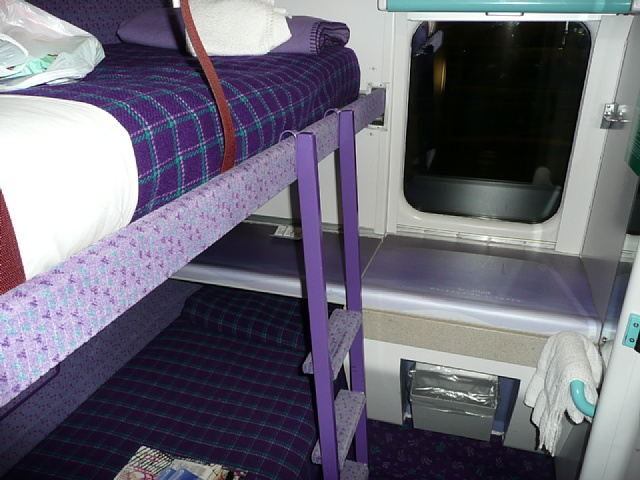
Sleeping cabin in a Mark 3 sleeper

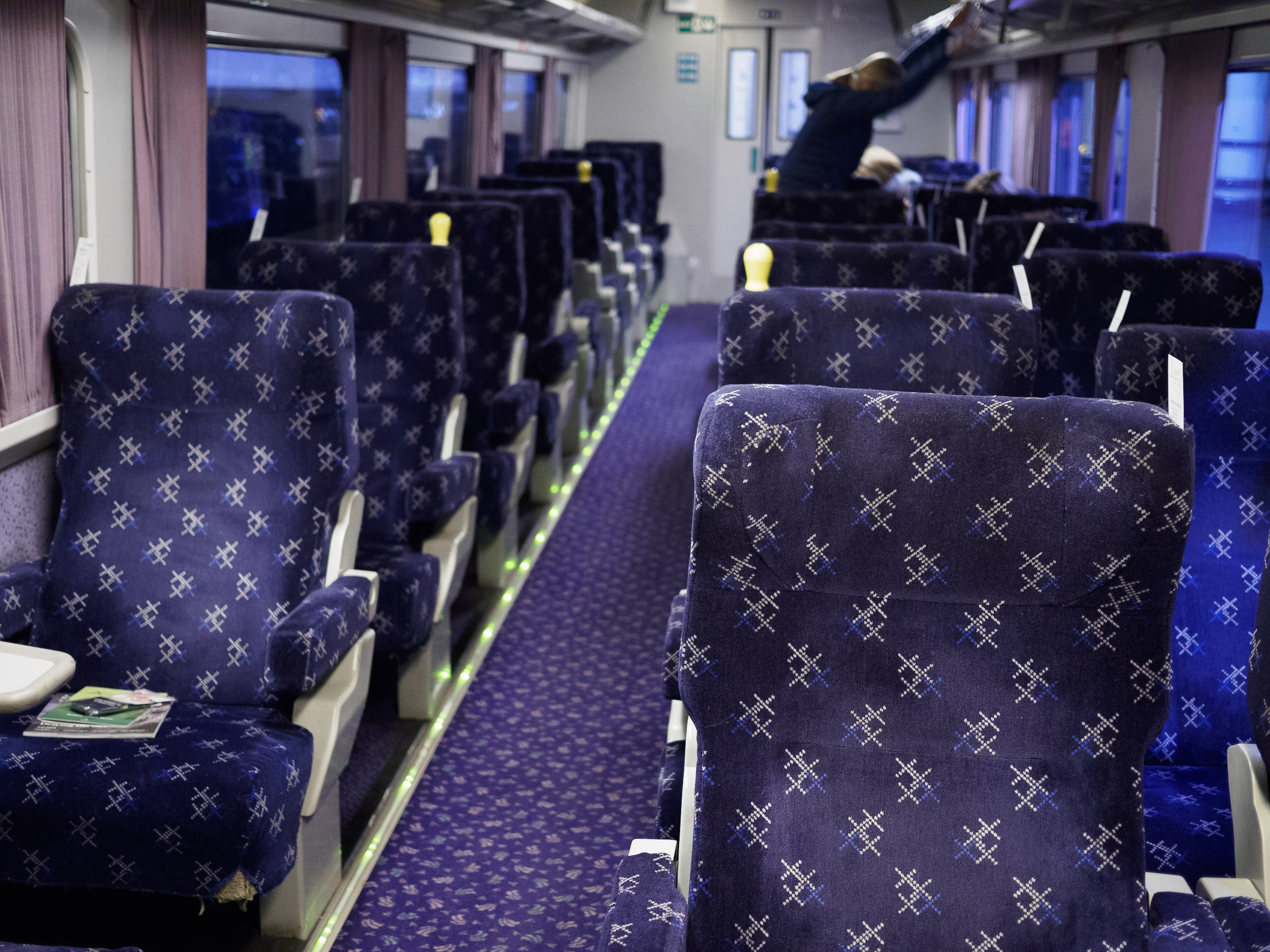
Saloon of a Mark 2 seated coach

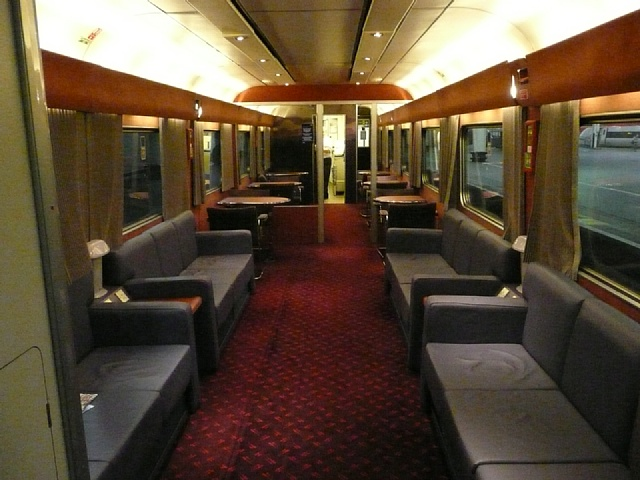
Lounge car in 2007

== Incidents ==
During April 2019, new Mark 5 carriages were introduced to service, however, the inaugural journey was more than three hours late arriving at London Euston. Various other services through 2019 were reported as delayed on account of "technical faults".

Services run joined between London and Scotland where they are split into shorter trains to serve multiple destinations. After being split at Carstairs on 1 August 2019, a brake isolating valve was closed preventing control of the train brakes from the locomotive, resulting in the Edinburgh portion running past the platform at Edinburgh Waverley. The incident was investigated by the Rail Accident Investigation Branch with two recommendations. One was addressed to the Rail Safety and Standards Board to change the wording of the railway rule book to make it clear that the brake continuity test should be undertaken after all coupling-related activities have been completed. The second was addressed to Caledonian Sleeper to review the vulnerability of the isolating cocks on its rolling stock, to prevent inadvertent operation by persons or objects.

== See also ==
- Night Riviera

Preceded by ScotRail (British Rail)	Sub-brand of ScotRail franchise 1997–2004	Succeeded by First ScotRail
Preceded by ScotRail (National Express)	Sub-brand of ScotRail franchise 2004–2015	Succeeded by Caledonian Sleeper; Caledonian Sleeper franchise
Preceded by First ScotRail; ScotRail franchise	Operator of Caledonian Sleeper franchise 2015–	Incumbent
