= Chris Green (railway manager) =

British railway manager (born 1943)

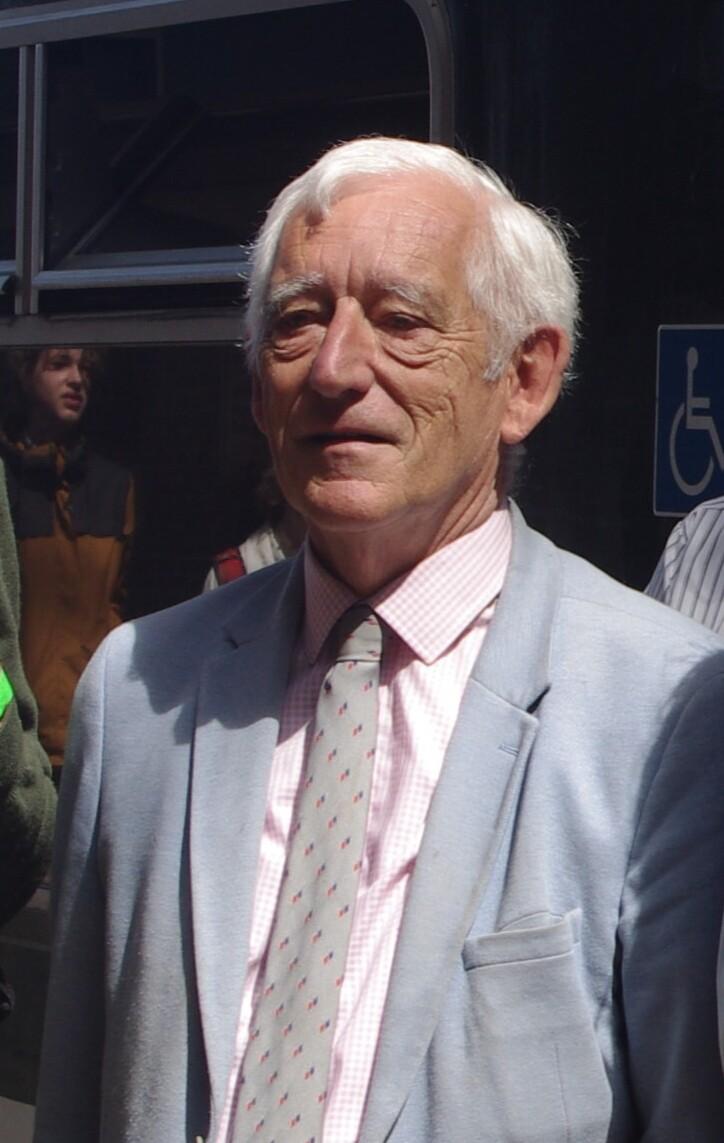
Chris Green in 2022

Chris Green (born 7 September 1943) is a British railway manager. He has a reputation for the adoption of business-led management of passenger services both in the British Rail and privatised eras, and has been described as "the best chairman BR never had".

== Early life ==
Green was born in Winchester and educated at St Paul's School, London and Oriel College, Oxford (where he read history).

== Railway career ==
=== Early career ===
Green began his career in 1965 as a trainee manager with British Rail in the West Midlands, becoming area manager at Hull in 1973.

In 1984 Green became manager of ScotRail, building its new identity.

In January 1986 he became BR Sector Director, London & South East. In April he announced that Marylebone station in central London would be reprieved from closure, and in June he launched Network SouthEast to unify London suburban rail services. In October 1989, Green briefly appeared on BBC Challenge Anneka in an episode covering the re-opening of Northiam railway station.

At the beginning of 1992 he was appointed managing director of the InterCity sector, with a remit to create a new integrated and profitable business (from that April) which he achieved with a particular emphasis on customer service.

=== Heritage interlude ===
Owing to an interest in the built heritage, in 1995 Green became chief executive of English Heritage. He resigned from this post 14 months later in July 1996, after reportedly clashing with the organisation's chairman Jocelyn Stevens amid allegations of irregularities including inappropriate expenses claims and unauthorised spending. An investigation by the National Audit Office found ''clear failure in the proper conduct of public business'', and a January 1998 report by the Public Accounts Committee made recommendations to improve the recruitment and training of accounting officers (the person in a public body who is responsible to Parliament for the money spent).

Green then became a director of consultants Gibb Rail and an advisor to the Transport Select Committee of the House of Commons. In 1995 he was appointed a board member of Eurotunnel.

=== Return to the mainline rail industry ===
In 1999, Green was invited back into active rail industry management as chief executive of Virgin Rail Group on a five-year contract with a twofold mission – to deliver a markedly improved service on the existing network and ensure the £1.8bn worth of new Class 390 Pendolino, Class 220 Voyager and Class 221 Super Voyager trains would be delivered on time. He also served as non-executive chairman of Virgin Rail Group Holdings in 2004–2005.

From 2005 to 2010 he was a non-executive director of Network Rail.

Green has also served as a non-executive director of Connex Rail; chairman of The Railway Forum, 2005–2006; an advisory board member of Cranfield University; and a trustee of the Royal Liverpool Philharmonic Orchestra.

Since 2012 he has been a Vice President of the advocacy group Railfuture, having been appointed at the same time as his peer Adrian Shooter.

On 25 February 2025, a Class 465 Networker unit, which had been repainted into a heritage Network SouthEast livery, was named after Chris Green at a naming ceremony at London Charing Cross.

In June 2025 he was awarded OBE in the King's Birthday Honours.

== Books ==
He has co-authored two books: one about Network SouthEast and the other about InterCity.

Business positions
| Preceded by | Chief Executive of Virgin Rail Group; 1999 - September 2004 | Succeeded by Tony Collins |
| Preceded by | Chief Executive of English Heritage; 1996 - 1998 | Succeeded by |
| Preceded by | Managing Director of InterCity; 1992 - 1995 | Succeeded by |
