= ScotRail (National Express) =

Scottish train operating company, 1997-2004

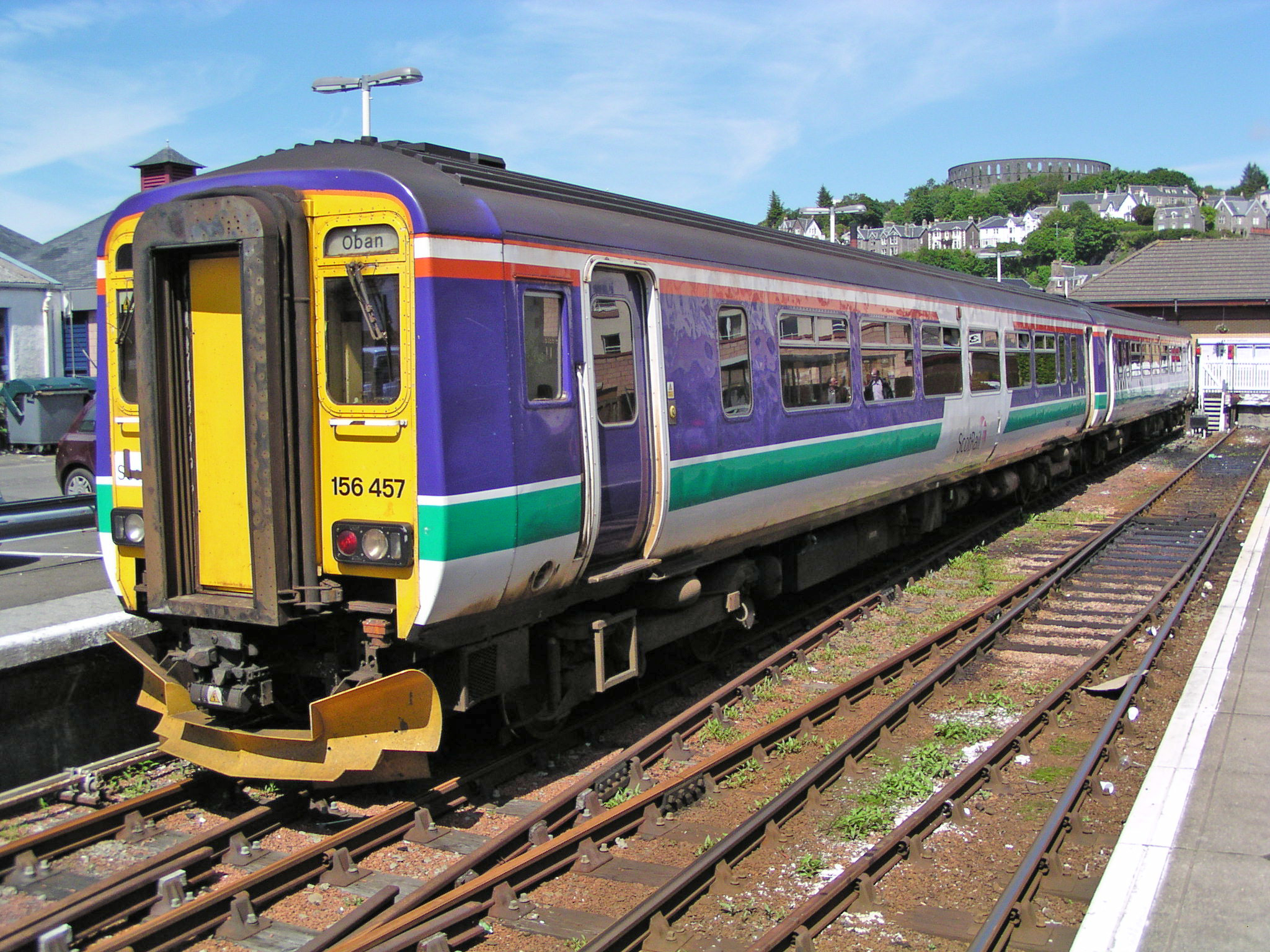
- Class 156 at Oban station in June 2005

Overview
- Franchises: ScotRail; 31 March 1997 – 16 October 2004
- Main Region: Scotland
- Fleet: 309
- Stations operated: 336
- Parent company: National Express Group
- Reporting mark: SR
- Predecessor: ScotRail (British Rail)
- Successor: First ScotRail

Technical
- Length: 3,032.0 km (1,884.0 mi)

ScotRail was a Scottish train operating company owned by National Express that operated the ScotRail franchise from March 1997 until October 2004. Prior to March 1997 ScotRail (British Rail) ran the trains and after October 2004 First ScotRail ran them.

== History ==
During the 1990s, the British Government undertook the privatisation of British Rail; the formerly state-owned ScotRail operation was the final of 25 passenger franchises to be bid for. On 1 April 1997, the British transport operator National Express took over operations of the franchise from incumbent British Rail; it operated under the ScotRail brand.

During 2002, National Express claimed that, unless additional public funding was provided to operate the Caledonian Sleeper, the company could not afford to continue the service. Two years later, the operator was accused of misleading the travelling public about seat availability on its sleeper services, the alleged motive being to lower passenger numbers and thus strengthen the business case for the service's termination; this allegation was denied by a company spokesperson.

The nature of ScotRail was a matter of some political controversy throughout its operation; in February 2003, the Scottish National Party publicly promised to undertake various measures towards the renationalisation of Scotland's rail services, specifically mentioning the ending of the ScotRail franchise in favour of state control.

In July 2003, the Scottish Executive and the Strategic Rail Authority shortlisted Arriva, FirstGroup and National Express to bid for the next franchise. During June 2004, the franchise was awarded to First ScotRail; operations were transferred to the new operator on 17 October 2004.

== Services ==
ScotRail operated all passenger train services in Scotland, with the exception of the Arriva Trains Northern, GNER, Virgin CrossCountry and Virgin Trains West Coast services from England. ScotRail operated services into England with services to Carlisle and Newcastle, and the Caledonian Sleeper services between Scotland and London.

By 2004, in response to competitive pressure from emerging budget airlines, ScotRail had reduced some of its long distance fares.

== Rolling stock ==
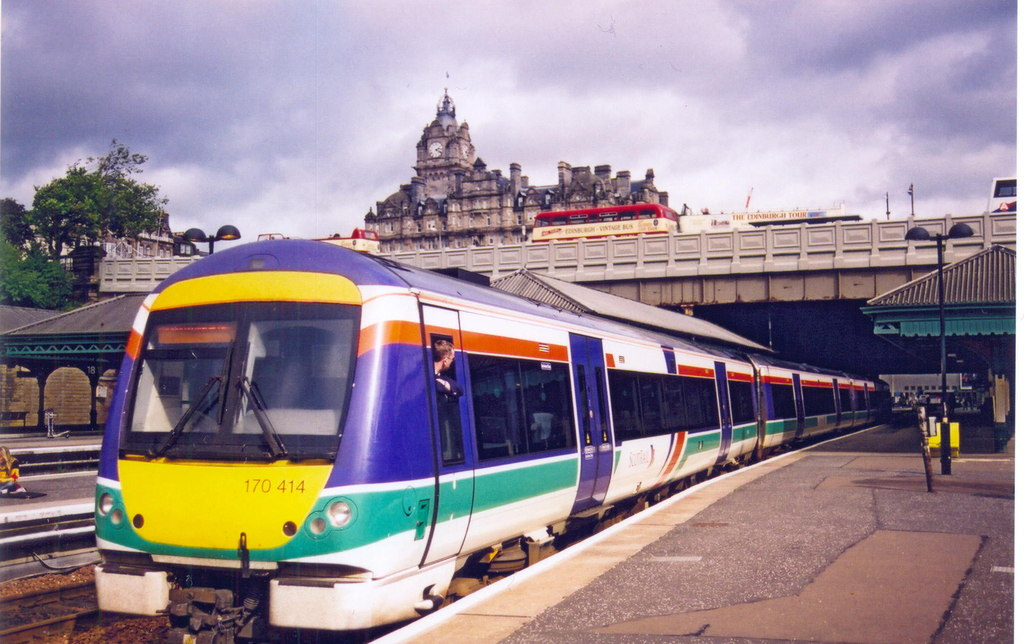
Class 170 at Edinburgh Waverley

ScotRail inherited a fleet of Class 101, Class 117 Class 150, Class 156, Class 158, Class 303, Class 305, Class 314, Class 318 and Class 320s from British Rail as well as Mark 2 carriages and Mark 3 sleepers for use on the Caledonian Sleepers and on some other passenger services.

ScotRail contracted English Welsh & Scottish to haul the Caledonian Sleeper services to London Euston. Class 90s were used south of Edinburgh and Glasgow Central with Class 37s used on the portion to Fort William and Class 47s to Aberdeen and Inverness.

Class	Image	Type	Top speed		Built
Class	Image	Type	mph	km/h	Built
101		Diesel multiple unit	70	112	1956–1960
150 Sprinter		Diesel multiple unit	75	120	1984–1987
156 Super Sprinter		Diesel multiple unit	75	120	1987–1989
158 Express Sprinter		Diesel multiple unit	90	145	1989–1992
170 Turbostar		Diesel multiple unit	100	160	1999–2004
303 Blue Train		Electric multiple unit	75	120	1959–1961
305		Electric multiple unit	75	120	1959–1960
314		Electric multiple unit	75	120	1979
318		Electric multiple unit	90	145	1986–1987
320		Electric multiple unit	75	120	1990
322		Electric multiple unit	100	160	1990
334 Coradia Juniper		Electric multiple unit	90	145	1999–2002
Mark 2 Carriage		Passenger rolling stock	100	160	1969–1974
Mark 3 Carriage		Passenger rolling stock	125	200	1975–1988

== Depots ==
ScotRail's fleet was maintained at Haymarket, Glasgow Shields Road and Inverness depots.

== See also ==
- ScotRail, the train operating company operating the ScotRail franchise since 1 April 2022
- ScotRail (brand)

Preceded by ScotRail (British Rail)	Operator of ScotRail franchise 1997–2004	Succeeded by First ScotRail
