= ScotRail (brand) =

Brand for passenger railways in Scotland

- Rèile na h-Alba

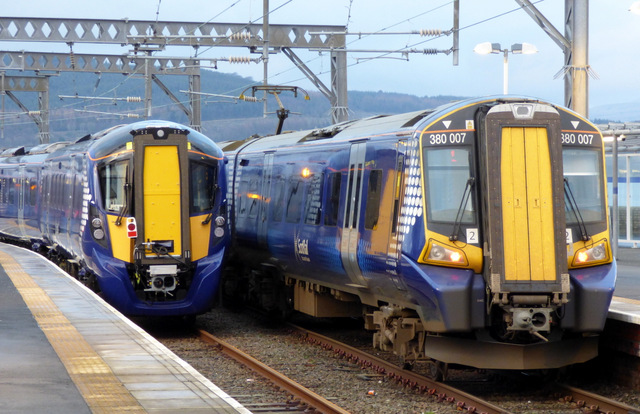
- Class 380 and Class 385 at Gourock station
- Main area: Scotland
- Other area: Northern England
- Stations called at: 360 managed

Other
- Website: www.scotrail.co.uk

ScotRail (Scottish Gaelic: Rèile na h-Alba) has been the brand name used for all Scottish regional and commuter rail services, including some cross-border services, since September 1983, as well as many of the country's intercity services.

Since 2008, it is the permanent name of the Scottish commuter rail service, regardless of the train operating company that operates it. The ScotRail service was re-nationalised by the Scottish Government on 1 April 2022.

== History ==
Regional Railways ScotRail branding

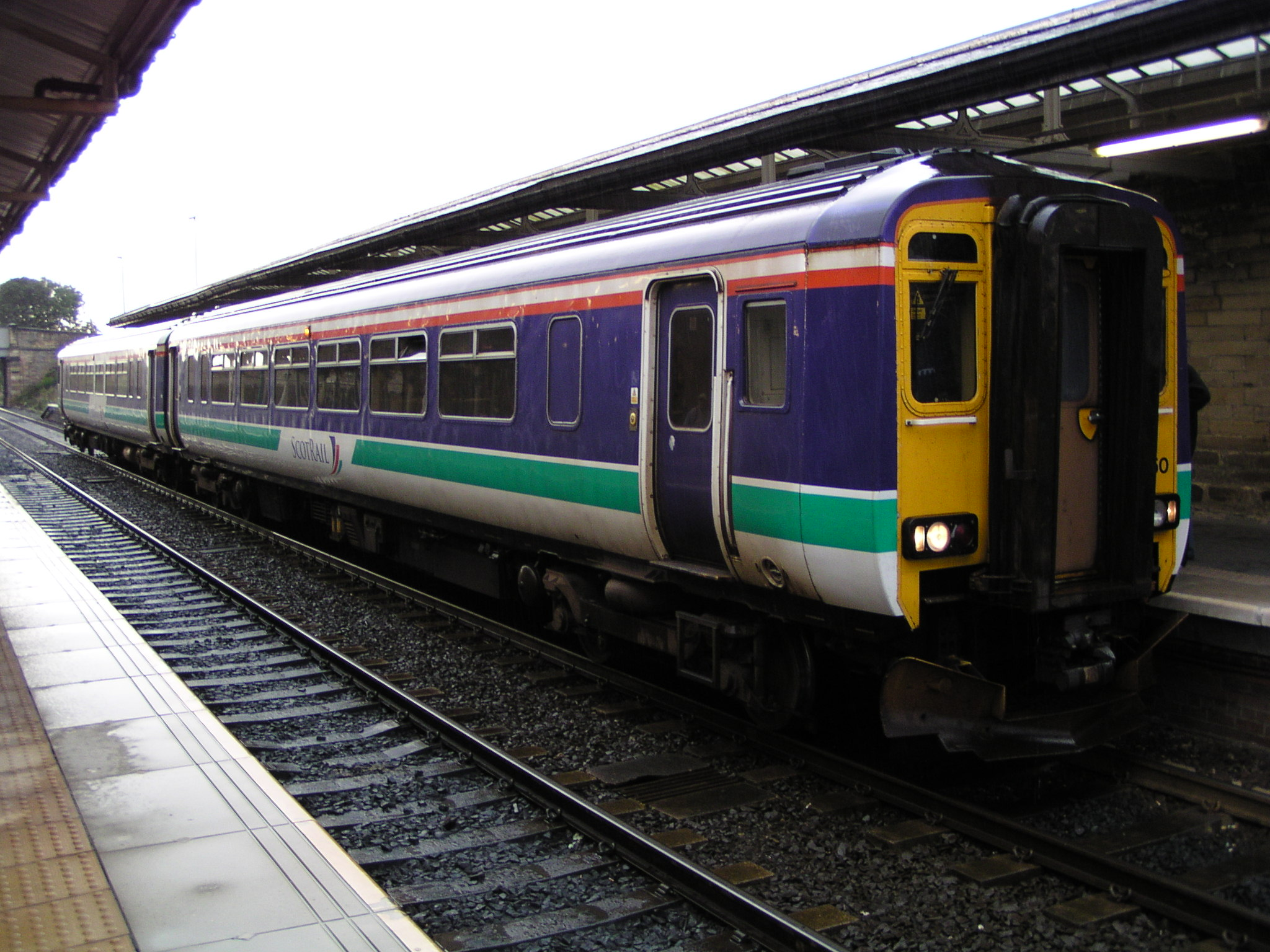
ScotRail (National Express) liveried 156450 at Hexham station in 2004

Regional Railways 1991 logo

ScotRail (National Express) emblem

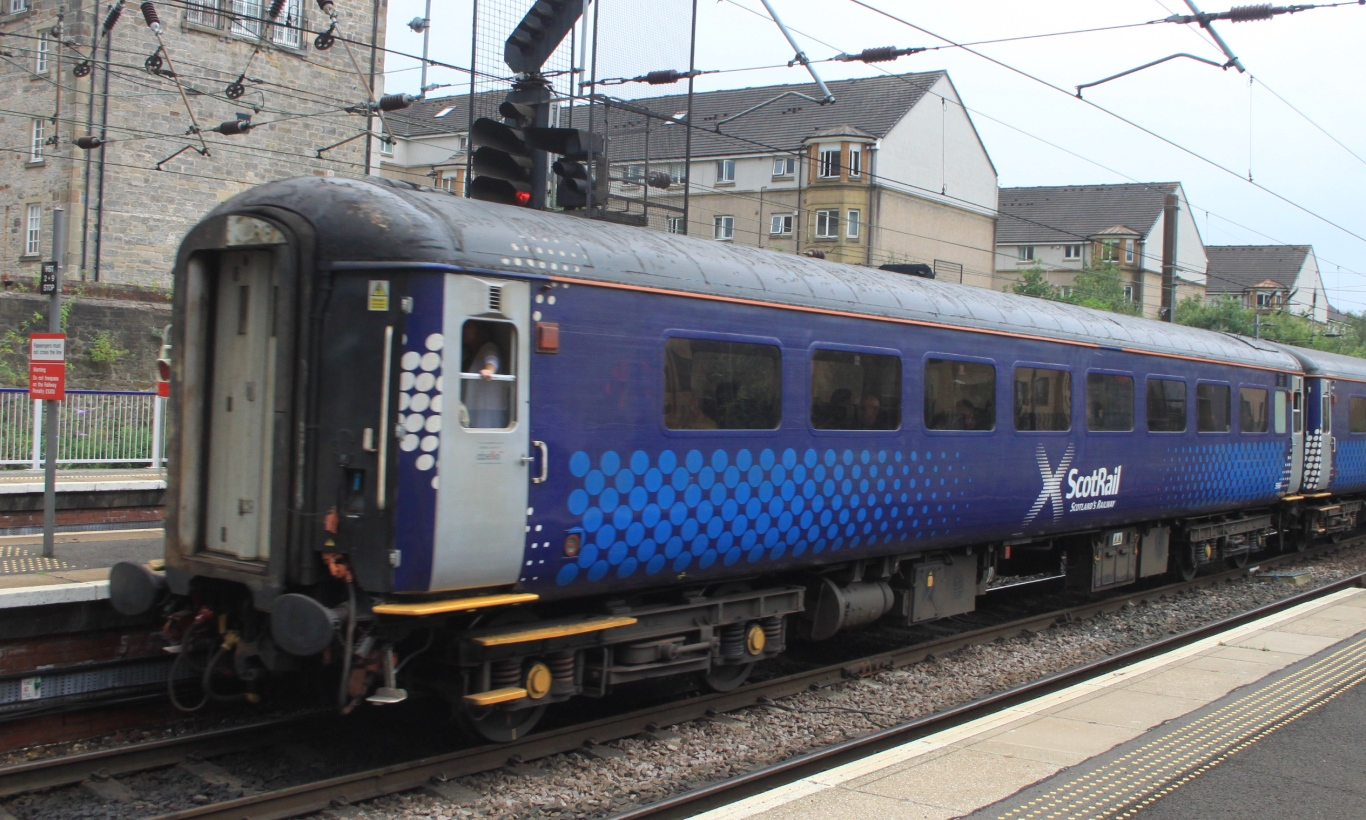
Saltire style ScotRail branding on a Mark 2 carriage at Haymarket in 2016

=== 1980s: British Rail ===
The ScotRail brand was created by British Railways Scottish Region manager Chris Green in the mid-1980s to provide a distinctive brand for the rail network in Scotland. The brand has developed and is still in use today.

ScotRail, under British Rail, used customised versions of the existing liveries, with passenger locomotives and coaching stock painted in a lightly modified version of the InterCity Executive livery. The red stripe was replaced with a saltire blue stripe, and the InterCity name was replaced with the ScotRail name. Most diesel locomotives carried standard InterCity Executive livery, but with ScotRail branding. Diesel and electric multiple units carried normal versions of the Regional Railways livery. In the Strathclyde PTE area, rolling stock (DMUs and EMUs) was painted in Strathclyde orange and black.

=== 1997–2004: National Express ===
The brand was adopted by National Express when it took over the franchise from British Rail during privatisation in 1997. The first unique ScotRail livery was introduced shortly after privatisation under National Express.

Initially, vehicles received the new ScotRail logo applied with vinyl stickers; a stylised outline of Scotland composed of three flashes in colours of green, red and purple. Multiple units were painted into the new livery with bodies in white (lower half) and purple (upper half) with green, red and white stripes bordering the purple, overlain by a wide diagonal white band in the centre of the carriage. There were no units left with Regional Railways livery in Scotland at the end of the National Express franchise period, although the Class 305 electric units retained it until withdrawal in 2001. The latter were replaced by ex-Stansted Skytrain Class 322 units which were never repainted under the National Express franchise, receiving only ScotRail logo transfers. When the Class 322 hire ended in 2004, they were replaced on the North Berwick branch by English Welsh & Scottish Class 90 electric locomotives hauling former Virgin Trains West Coast Mark 3 coaching stock, in the old Virgin red and grey livery, again with ScotRail logo transfers.

=== 2004–2015: FirstGroup ===
When FirstGroup became the franchisee on 17 October 2004, in line with other rail franchises it held, the brand was revised as First ScotRail.

When First acquired the franchise, a new regional livery of pink, grey and purple and a new logo of a pink circle and an italicised f character was introduced. Legislation requiring train doors to be painted in a contrasting colour to the body, for visually impaired passengers, resulted in white doors with a pink stripe. Like National Express, First applied their logo on units by transfer until repainting. A large number of units were rebranded into this livery, including the Class 322 units re-acquired and refurbished for North Berwick service and the Class 90 locomotives used on Caledonian Sleeper services.

In September 2008 the Scottish Government agency, Transport Scotland, announced that the franchised Scottish rail services would be permanently renamed ScotRail. Transport Scotland designed a new livery with a dark blue background, grey doors and a white dotted 'Saltire' Scottish flag. A new logo was also applied, ScotRail, with the tagline 'Scotland's Railway', which on some units is replaced with the Scottish Gaelic translation 'Rèile na h-Alba'. Stations and staff uniforms were also given a new dark blue look. This livery would not be replaced each time the franchise changed; the only branding naming the operator was a small "ScotRail is operated by" sign on the station building and on the train doors. When next tendered in 2015, the franchise was split with the Caledonian Sleeper becoming a separate franchise. On 1 April 2015, the ScotRail franchise was taken over by Abellio ScotRail while the Caledonian Sleeper service was taken over by Serco.

=== 2015–2022: Abellio ===
From 1 April 2015 to 1 April 2022, ScotRail was operated by the subsidiary of the Netherlands-based transport conglomerate Abellio. This franchise ended on 31 March 2022.

=== 2022-present: Scottish Government ===
On 1 April 2022, a Scottish Government-owned operator of last resort took over operation of the ScotRail service, maintaining the ScotRail brand.

== Great British Railways ==
In 2021, the Conservative UK Government announced a plan to bring railway services in Great Britain under a single national brand by 2023, known as Great British Railways. Railway services in Scotland would use GBR's branding, albeit with a "regional variant", with the plan emphasising the need for a unified brand to display the railway as one network. The Labour government elected in 2024 continued with a modified and expanded version of these plans, stating in 2025 that the Scottish Government would continue to commission ScotRail services, and that GBR would work closely with ScotRail to replicate the existing alliance between Network Rail and ScotRail.
