= InterCity (British Rail) =

Sector and brand of British Rail (1966–1997)

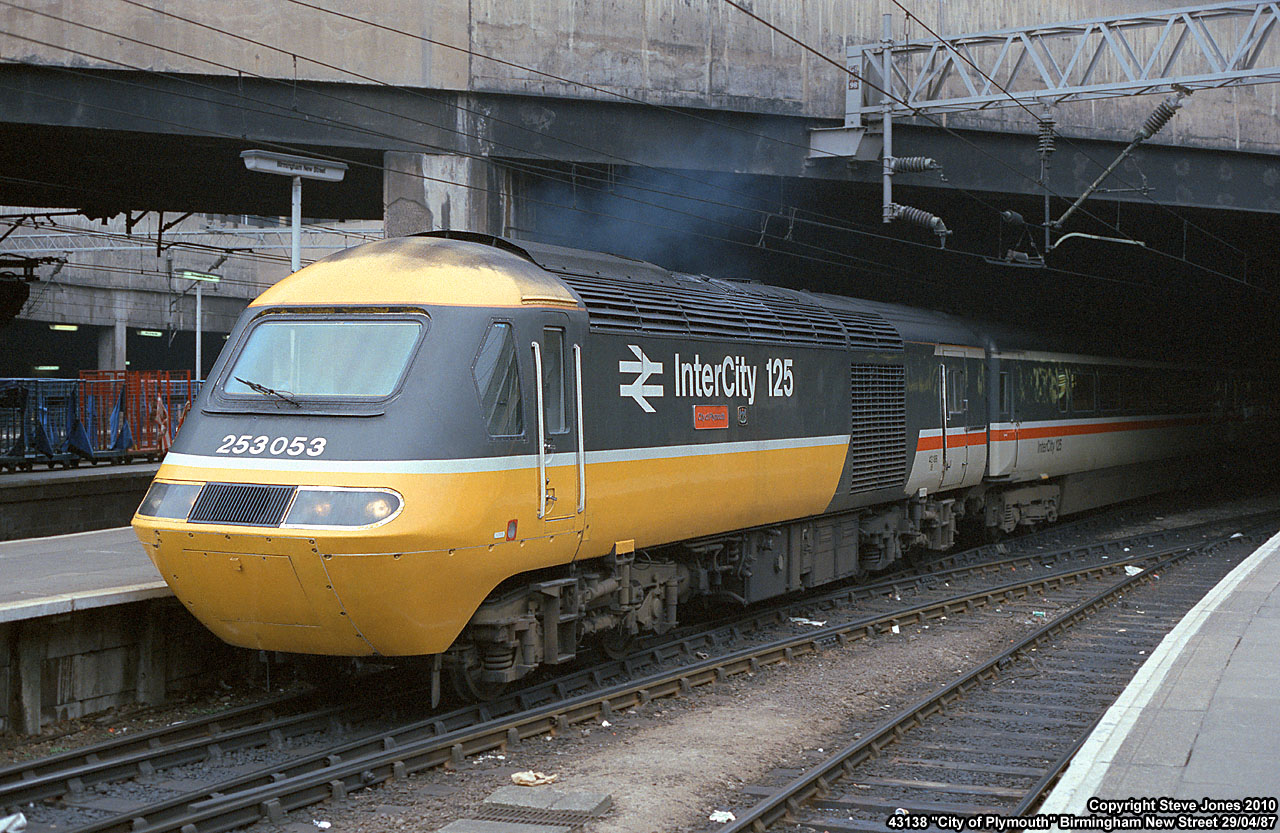
- A High Speed Train in InterCity livery at Birmingham New Street, 1987

Overview
- Main Region: All
- Other Region: All
- Fleet: 180
- Stations called at: 190
- Parent company: British Rail
- Dates of operation: 1966–1994
- Successors: Great North Eastern Railway; Midland Mainline; Great Western Trains; Anglia Railways; Virgin West Coast; Virgin CrossCountry

InterCity (or, in its earliest days, the hyphenated Inter-City) was a brand name introduced by British Rail in 1966 for its long-haul express passenger services. (Note: See British Rail brand names for a full history.)

In 1982, the British Railways Board divided its operations into a number of sectors, through sectorisation; that responsible for long-distance express trains assumed the brand-name InterCity, although many routes that were previously operated as InterCity services were assigned to other sectors; e.g. London King's Cross to King's Lynn services were transferred to the Network SouthEast sector instead.

The brand was discontinued after the privatisation of British Rail in 1997, although it now used by Locomotive Services for its heritage railtour fleet.

== Branding ==
British Rail's InterCity Swallow logo

=== Etymology ===
InterCity derives from the prepositional of the Latin: inter-, lit. 'between' with City giving rise to meaning 'between cities'.

=== The Inter-City train ===
British Rail first used the term Inter-City in 1950, as the name of a service running between London Paddington and Wolverhampton Low Level. This was part of an overall policy of introducing new train names in the post-World War II period.

The name was applied to the business express which ran from London in the morning and returned in the afternoon; it became part of the railway lore of the West Midlands. Its residents always believed that it was the success of this one train that led to the adoption of the name as a British Rail brand in 1966. This belief was supported by the timeline; in 1966, The Inter-City was heading towards its ultimate demise in 1967, when the London-West Midlands main line service was consolidated into the newly electrified route via Rugby.

=== Brand introduction ===
British Rail introduced the Inter-City brand for its long-haul passenger services in 1966. It has also been adopted by countries in Europe.

== Sector ==
With sectorisation of British Rail in 1982, most long-haul services became consolidated in the InterCity division, which retained the brand. The division became profitable and one of Britain's top 150 companies, providing city centre to city centre travel across Great Britain from Aberdeen and Inverness in the north of Scotland to Poole and Penzance in the south of England.

=== Sub-sectors ===
In 1986, InterCity had the following sub-sectors:

- Anglia InterCity: Services on the Great Eastern Main Line from London Liverpool Street to Essex and East Anglia
- Charter Trains
- Cross Country: Services between city pairs that used a combination of the various main lines, but usually avoided Greater London; many of these served the Cross-Country Route
- East Coast Main Line: Services from London King's Cross to Yorkshire, North East England and eastern Scotland
- Gatwick: The Gatwick Express service between London Victoria and Gatwick Airport
- Great Western Main Line: Services from London Paddington to the West Country and South Wales, including overnight sleeper services
- Midland Main Line: Services from London St Pancras to the East Midlands and South Yorkshire
- West Coast Main Line: Services from London Euston to the West Midlands, North Wales, North West England and southern Scotland, including overnight sleeper services to Scotland.

=== Profit centres ===
By the end of 1992, the sub-sectors had been reorganised into five profit centres:

- Anglia & Gatwick Express
- East Coast Main Line
- Great Western
- Midland Cross Country
- West Coast Main Line.

== Operations ==
InterCity operated High Speed Trains (HST) under the brand name InterCity 125, as well as InterCity 225s for the electric high-speed trains operated on the East Coast route. The 125 referred to the trains' top speed in miles per hour (mph), equivalent to 201 km/h, whereas 225 referred to the intended top speed in km/h (equivalent to 140 mph); for signalling reasons, their actual speed limit was the same 125 mph.

InterCity 250 was the name given by InterCity to the proposed upgrade of the West Coast Main Line in the early 1990s. The existing trains operating on the West Coast were intended to be marketed under the brand InterCity 175, again referring to those trains' top operating speed of 110 miles (180 km) per hour, although this idea was subsequently dropped.

All InterCity day services ran with a buffet car and the majority ran at speeds of 100 mph or above. If expresses on other sectors were included, there was a period in the early 1990s when British Rail operated more 100 mph services per day than any other country. Special discounted fares, including the Super Advance and the APEX, were available if booked in advance.

== Rolling stock ==
HST services were first introduced in 1976 on the Great Western Main Line between London Paddington, Bristol Temple Meads, Cardiff Central and Swansea. Formations consisted of two first-class Mark 3 carriages, a restaurant buffet and four standard-class, with a Class 43 power car at each end.

Rolling stock used in each sub-sector was as follows:

- East Coast – InterCity 125 HST services started in 1977: Typically two first-class, a restaurant kitchen, buffet standard and four standard-class Mark 3 carriages, with a Class 43 power car at each end. These progressively replaced Class 55 Deltics, which were withdrawn in 1981. Later, as catering needs changed, the restaurant kitchen was replaced by a fifth standard-class coach. InterCity 225 sets comprised a Class 91 electric locomotive, nine Mark 4 coaches and a Driving Van Trailer (DVT) operating in push-pull mode; these were introduced in 1990, with electrification completed in 1991. This saw most of the HSTs transferred to the Great Western, Midland and Cross-Country routes, but some remained for the runs to/from Aberdeen, Inverness and Hull.
- West Coast – London Euston to Wolverhampton used Class 86 electric locomotives hauling Mark 2 carriages and operated up to 100 mph. One daily round trip extended to Aberystwyth as the Cambrian Coast Express until 1991, using Class 37 diesel locomotives over the unelectrified part of the route. Euston to Glasgow services used Classes 86, 87 and 90 electric locomotives hauling Mark 3 coaches, operated at up to 110 mph. Euston to Holyhead services used Class 47-hauled Mark 2s or HSTs. From 1988, West Coast trains operated in push-pull mode with a DVT at the London end of the train. Before DVTs were introduced, larger fleets of Classes 81–87 were used to haul the trains conventionally. Class 50s operated in pairs north of Preston until electrification was completed in 1974.
- Midland – Classes 45, 46 and 47 locomotives hauling Mark 1 and Mark 2 carriages. HSTs replaced the locomotive-hauled trains in the 1980s.
- Great Western – InterCity 125s from new, which replaced Class 50s, which in turn, replaced Class 52s. Other services were also operated by Mark 2 carriages hauled by Class 47s and 50s; later these were transferred to Network SouthEast and replaced by Class 165 diesel multiple units.
- Great Eastern – Class 47 diesel locomotives hauled Mark 1 and Mark 2 carriages before electrification of the route beyond Colchester was completed in the mid-80s. Class 86 electric locomotives were introduced to haul trains from London Liverpool Street to Ipswich from May 1985, (Note: Class 47 diesel locomotives would then haul the remainder of the service to/from Norwich.) with through electric trains reaching Norwich by 1987. Mark 2 Driving Brake Standard Opens were cascaded from Scotland in the early 1990s, so that trains could operate in push-pull mode. Some routes transferred to Network SouthEast, leaving Norwich and the London-Harwich Parkeston Quay boat trains with InterCity.
- Cross Country – Some routes were operated by InterCity 125s, but with only one first-class carriage and standard-class seats in the buffet car replaced the restaurant. Other routes saw Mark 2 carriages hauled by Class 47 diesel locomotives. Services operating north of Birmingham on the West Coast Main Line switched to electric traction using Class 86 and 90 locomotives; DVTs were not used.
- Gatwick Express – This service used originally dedicated Class 423 electric multiple units, as part of the Southern Region. Prior to being transferred to InterCity, the service ran from London Victoria, calling at Clapham Junction, East Croydon (sometimes via Redhill), Gatwick Airport, Haywards Heath to Brighton. The service was transferred to InterCity in 1984, with Class 73 electro-diesel locomotives hauling Mark 2 coaches and a modified Class 414 driving motor carriage, in push-pull mode; the service then only served London Victoria and Gatwick Airport.
- Sleepers – Originally consisted of Mark 2 or Mark 3 seating coaches with Mark 1 sleeper cars. Mark 3 sleeper cars replaced the Mark 1s in the early 1980s; DVTs were not used. The Night Riviera service (Paddington-Penzance) was hauled by Class 47s, while the Euston-Scotland sleepers were usually hauled by Class 86, 87 or 90 electric locomotives as far as Edinburgh Waverley and Glasgow Central. The sections north of Edinburgh were hauled by Class 37 or 47 diesel locomotives to/from Aberdeen and Inverness, while the section to/from Fort William was hauled by Class 37s. The London Euston to Stranraer Harbour service worked on the same basis with a change from electric to diesel at Carlisle. The service to Holyhead saw locomotive changes at Crewe.

=== Fleet details ===
Class	Image	Number	Power	Carriages	Notes	
Class 08			Diesel Shunter	N/A		
Class 09		38	Diesel Shunter	N/A		
Class 31			Diesel Locomotive	N/A	Used on Summer Saturday specials	
Class 37		308	Diesel Locomotive	N/A	Used on Scottish sleepers in pairs with generators van. Used on Cambrian Line.	
Class 43		197	High Speed Train	Around 8 as part of InterCity 125 sets	Used on Scottish sleepers in pairs with generators van. Used on Cambrian Line.	
Class 47		512	Diesel Locomotive	N/A	Used on Scottish sleepers in pairs with generators van. Used on Cambrian Line.	
Class 50		50	Diesel Locomotive	N/A	Never carried InterCity livery in service, but now carried by 50031	
Class 73		12	Electro Diesel Locomotive	N/A	Used on Gatwick Express services	
Class 82		8	AC Electric Locomotive	N/A		
Class 83		13	AC Electric Locomotive	N/A		
Class 86		100	AC Electric Locomotive	N/A		
Class 87		36	AC Electric Locomotive	N/A		
Class 89		1	AC Electric Locomotive	N/A		
Class 90		15	AC Electric Locomotive	N/A		
Class 91		31	AC Electric Locomotive	N/A		9 as part of an InterCity 225 set
Class 99		15	Ship	N/A		N/A
Class 370		3	AC Electric Multiple Unit	14		Part of the APT project
Class 488		29	Coach	3 + 1 Class 73		Used on Gatwick Express
Class 489		10	GLV	1		Used on Gatwick Express
Mark 1 Coach			Coach	1		
Mark 2 Coach			Coach	1		
Mark 3 Coach		848	Coach	1		
Mark 4 Coach		314	Coach	1		
Mark 3 DVT		52	Driving Van Trailer			
Mark 4 DVT		32	Driving Van Trailer			

== Train formation ==
Formations of HST and push–pull train sets would always place the driving van at the London end of the train, then two or three first-class carriages, restaurant and buffet car, and five standard-class carriages; the locomotive would always be at the country end of the train. The only exception was the London to Norwich route; as Crown Point TMD lies to the south of Norwich station, the locomotives worked from the London end as this facilitated easier locomotive changing at its home depot, if necessary. Operating trains in push-pull mode eliminated the requirement to attach locomotives at terminus stations, in order to turn the trains around; this also saved maintenance costs and reduced the number of locomotives and carriages needed to operate services.

== Main destinations ==
=== East Coast Main Line ===
London Kings Cross, Stevenage, Peterborough, Grantham, Newark North Gate, Retford, Doncaster, Hull, Wakefield Westgate, Leeds, York, Northallerton, Darlington, Durham, Middlesbrough, Newcastle, Berwick-upon-Tweed, Dunbar, Edinburgh, Glasgow Central, Dundee, Perth, Aberdeen, Inverness.

=== West Coast Main Line ===
London Euston, Watford Junction, Bletchley, Milton Keynes Central (opened 1982), Rugby, Coventry, Birmingham International, Birmingham New Street, Wolverhampton, Stafford, Stoke-on-Trent, Crewe, Macclesfield, Wilmslow, Stockport, Manchester Piccadilly, Runcorn, Liverpool Lime Street, Chester, Llandudno Junction, Bangor, Holyhead, Warrington Bank Quay, Wigan North Western, Preston, Lancaster, Oxenholme, Carlisle, Motherwell, Glasgow Central.

=== Great Western Main Line ===
London Paddington, Reading, Didcot Parkway, Swindon, Bath Spa, Bristol Parkway, Bristol Temple Meads, Weston-super-Mare, Newport, Cardiff Central, Bridgend, Port Talbot Parkway, Neath, Swansea, Taunton, Tiverton Parkway, Exeter St David's, Newton Abbot, Paignton, Totnes, Plymouth, Bodmin Parkway, St Austell, Truro, Penzance.

=== Midland Main Line ===
London St Pancras, Luton, Bedford, Wellingborough, Kettering, Market Harborough, Leicester, Loughborough, Nottingham, Derby, Chesterfield, Sheffield, Leeds, York, Scarborough.

=== Cross Country Route ===
Penzance, Truro, St Austell, Plymouth, Totnes, Paignton, Torquay, Newton Abbot, Exeter St. David's, Taunton, Bristol Temple Meads, Bristol Parkway, Cardiff Central, Newport, London Paddington, Poole, Bournemouth, Southampton, Brighton, Gatwick Airport, Reading, Oxford, Gloucester, Cheltenham Spa, Coventry, Birmingham International, Birmingham New Street, Wolverhampton, Stafford, Crewe, Warrington Bank Quay, Wigan North Western, Stoke-on-Trent, Macclesfield, Stockport, Manchester Piccadilly, Manchester Oxford Road, Bolton, Hartford, Runcorn, Liverpool Lime Street, St Helens Central, Preston, Blackpool North, Lancaster, Oxenholme, Penrith, Carlisle, Motherwell, Glasgow Central, Derby, Sheffield, Doncaster, Leeds, York, Darlington, Durham, Newcastle, Berwick-upon-Tweed, Edinburgh, Kirkcaldy, Dundee, Arbroath, Aberdeen.

=== Great Eastern Main Line ===
London Liverpool Street, Chelmsford, Colchester, Manningtree, Harwich Parkeston Quay (for the ferry to the Hook of Holland), Ipswich, Stowmarket, Diss, Norwich.

=== Gatwick Express ===
London Victoria, Gatwick Airport.

== Liveries ==
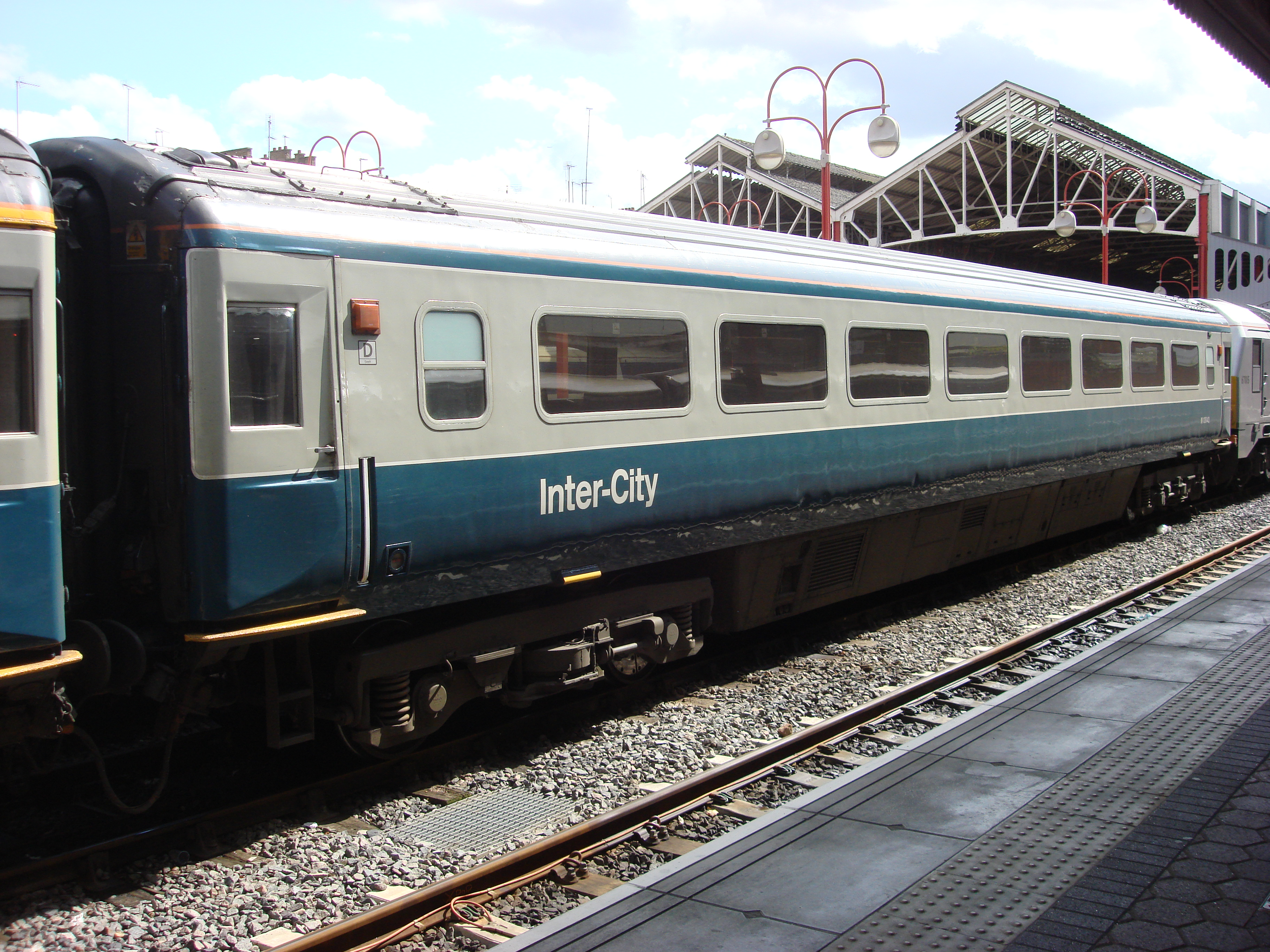
The original British Rail Inter-City livery

=== Rail blue ===
British Rail introduced a new corporate livery in 1965. The basic blue colour was relieved on long-distance coaches by a light grey panel around the windows. The fronts of locomotives and multiple-unit trains were painted yellow to improve visibility; this was often wrapped around on to the side in varying amounts. This was therefore the colour scheme used by the new Inter-City services when they were launched the following year.

Coaches used on these routes later had a white Inter-City logo added to the blue area near the door at the left end of each side. This was extended to show the purpose of specialist vehicles, such as Inter-City Sleeper.

When the production HST sets entered service in 1976, they too carried the blue and grey livery. The coaches carried an Inter-City 125 logo by the left-hand door. The part of the power car nearest the passenger coaches was also painted blue and grey, but most of the power car was painted yellow with a wide blue panel which lined up with the grey on the coaches. On this blue panel was a large Inter-City 125 logo, albeit in outline rather than solid white.

=== Executive ===
The first production Advanced Passenger Train was unveiled on 7 June 1978. It was painted in a new livery with dark grey upper body and light grey lower body, separated by wide white and red bands. The roof was white to reduce solar heating, and a large InterCity APT logotype was positioned on the dark grey section of the power cars; InterCity had no hyphen and was solid white, but the APT was an outline.

A new Executive service was part of the relaunch of the InterCity sector on 3 October 1983. This saw the coaches of the Manchester Pullman and two HSTs refurbished and repainted experimentally into the same colour scheme as the APT. The HSTs continued to carry an outline InterCity 125 logotype, now with no hyphen, and the large yellow area on the power car that had been a feature of the blue and grey livery. The logotype on coaches was positioned as before but changed to black.

By May 1984, other coaches and locomotives were entering service in the dark and light grey livery. 87012 Coeur de Lion entered service with black numbers on the cab side but no logo. 73123 Gatwick Express had white numbers and a large double arrow logo on the dark grey of its bodyside, although the new Gatwick Express service was not operated by the InterCity sector.

In use, there were problems with the light colour showing dirt on the diesel HSTs and so dark grey was extended from the roof to cover the louvres, near the top of the power car body, and the logotype was changed from an outline to solid white to make it more striking. The use of the term Executive was dropped in 1985.

=== Swallow ===
A new logotype was introduced on 1 May 1987, as part of InterCity's 21st anniversary celebrations. The colours were unchanged, although locomotives often carried less yellow than before; locomotives, carriages and advertising received a new logotype: the word INTERCITY was presented in italic, serif upper case letters. A new swallow logo "to symbolise grace and speed" replaced the double arrow. It was announced that the new branding would appear on "all InterCity trains that meet high quality standards." The logotype was omitted from some older locomotives that were otherwise carrying InterCity livery, although some that predominantly worked in Scotland were given a ScotRail logotype.

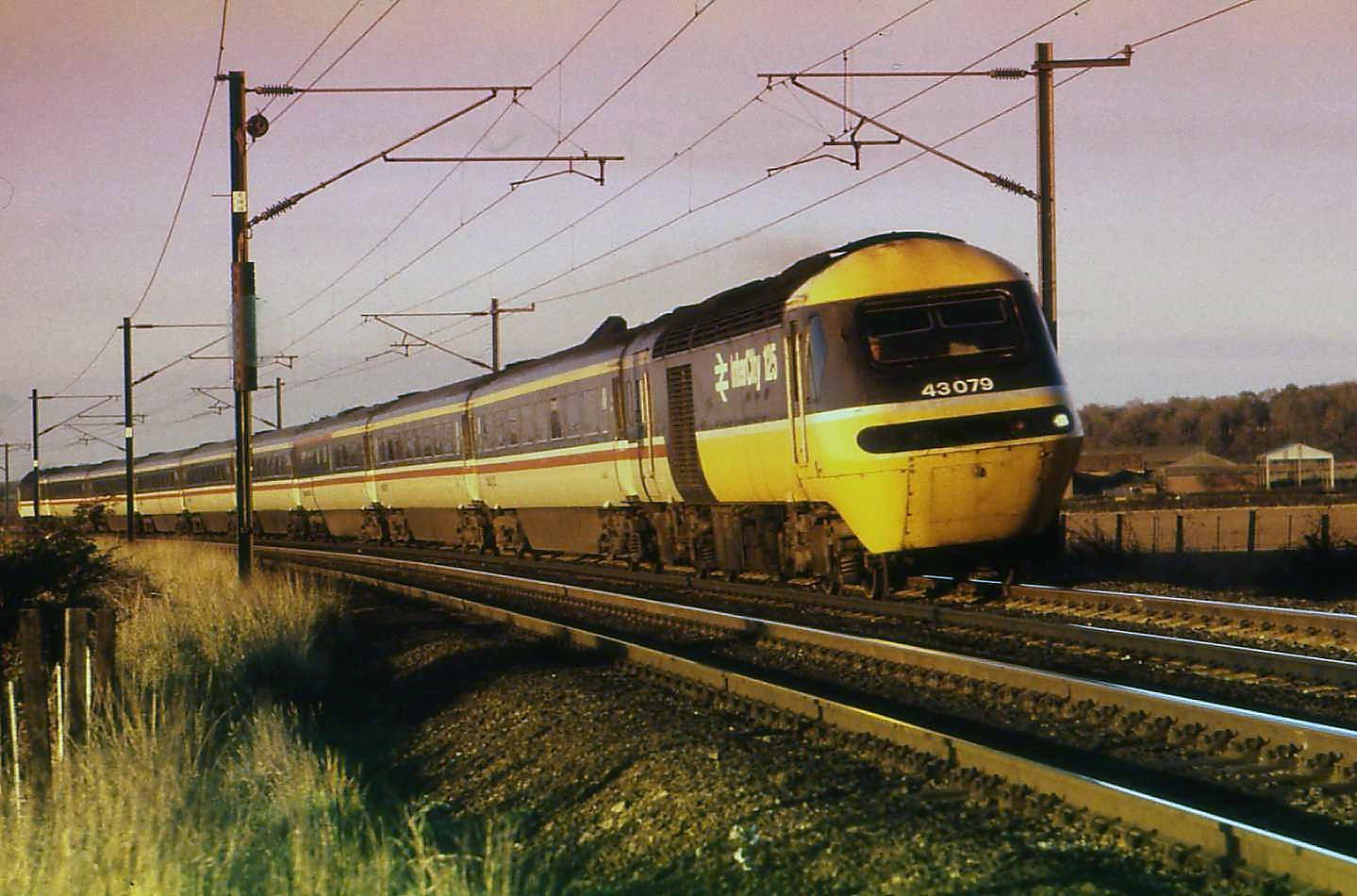
An HST in InterCity Executive livery

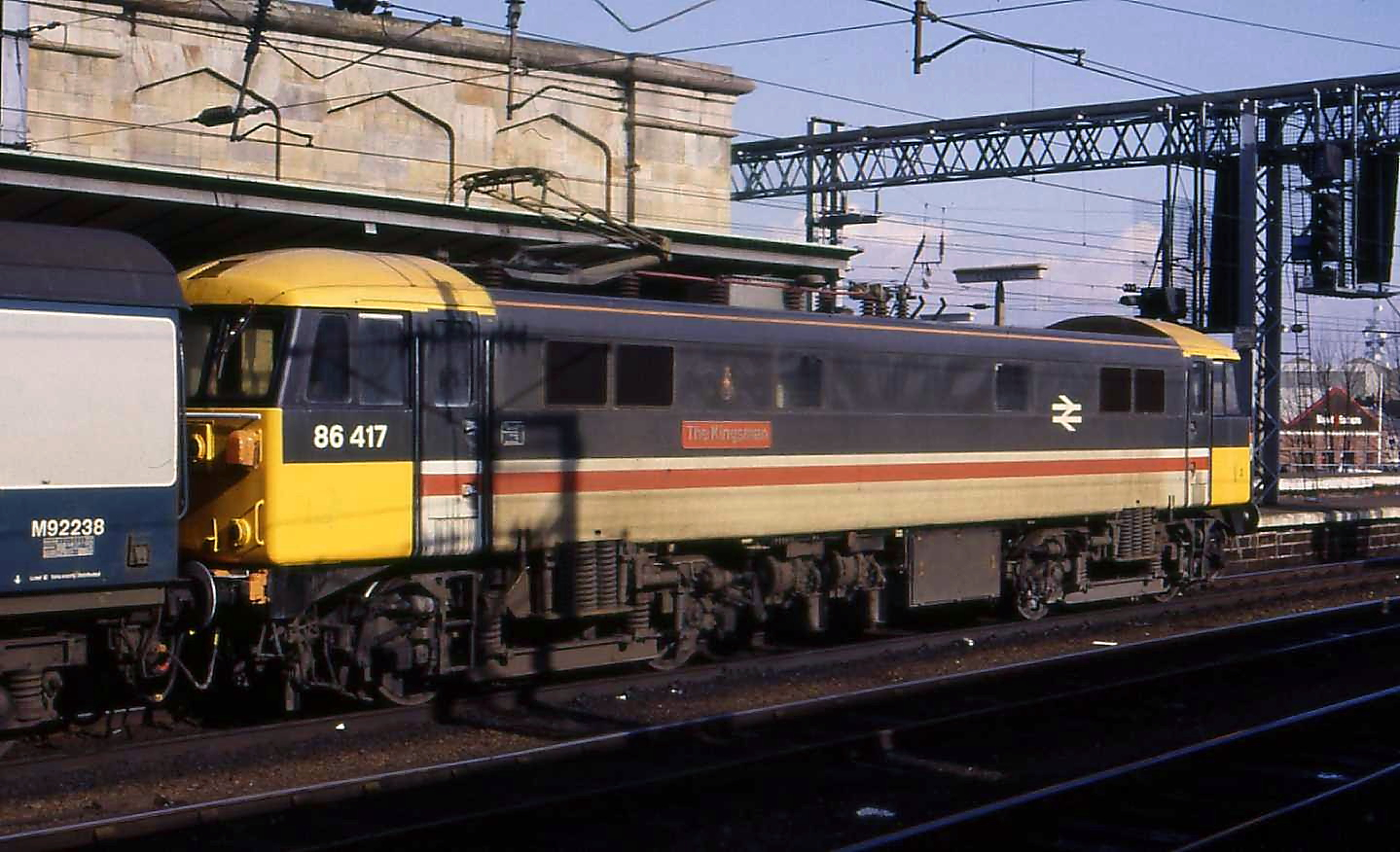
A Class 86 with no InterCity branding

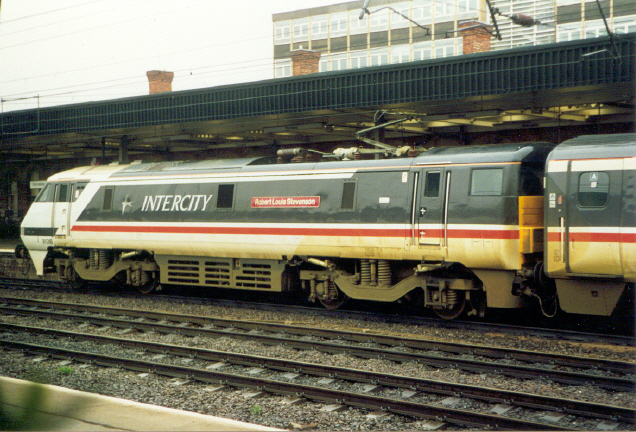
A Class 91 in InterCity Swallow livery

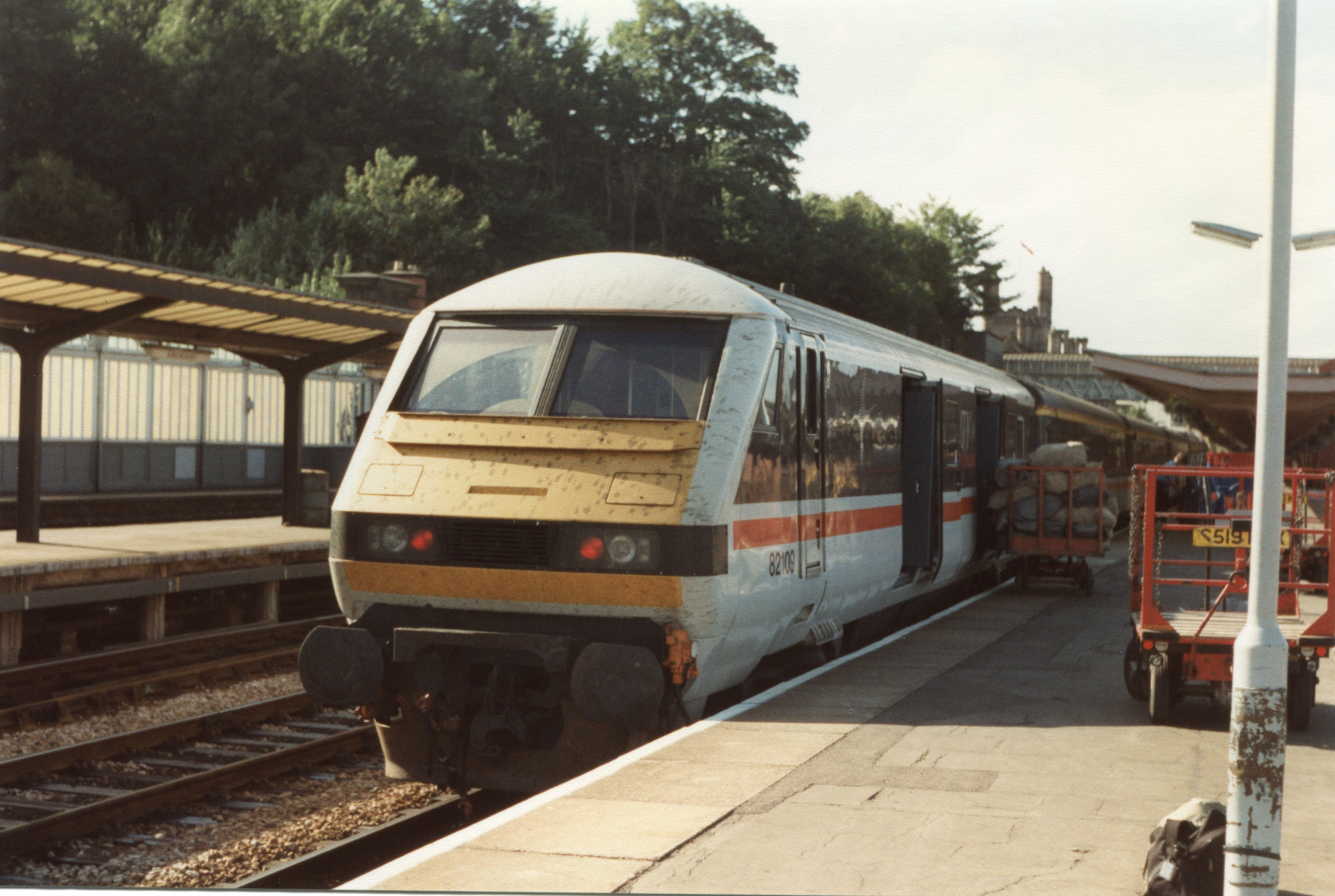
A Driving Van Trailer being loaded with mailbags, on a Shrewsbury to London Euston service

== Privatisation ==
During the privatisation of British Rail, InterCity's services were divided up into several franchises. Initial plans were for the train operating companies to co-operate to continue providing a consistent InterCity network, but disagreements meant this did not occur.

Great Western Trains registered the term as a British trademark and applied it to its HSTs, but the term fell into disuse before Great Western was bought by FirstGroup in 1998. Occasional services were run using Inter-City branded coaches, usually where additional rolling stock has been hired, but the term is not in official use by train operators.

The planned upgrade to many of Britain's former InterCity lines has been termed Intercity Express Programme. The new operators replaced the InterCity branding and liveries with their own. One set of Mark 2 carriages remained in InterCity livery until it was withdrawn by National Express East Anglia in 2005. Several locomotives and carriages have subsequently been repainted into InterCity livery. Virgin CrossCountry repainted 47826 into InterCity livery in December 2001.

Some stations on the West Coast Main Line still retain Swallow motifs in 2017. Abellio ScotRail announced that it is to revive the InterCity name on new services operated by refurbished High Speed Train sets, linking the seven cities in Scotland, from mid-2018.

Franchise name	Original franchise	Subsequently, and currently franchised	Government Franchising
InterCity East Coast	Great North Eastern Railway	Then passed to National Express East Coast (NXEC), but returned to temporary public ownership on 14 November 2009, following termination of the NXEC franchise when it was taken over by Directly Operated Railways as East Coast Then operated by Virgin Trains East Coast, and taken back into public ownership by London North Eastern Railway on 24 June 2018.	Yes
InterCity West Coast	Virgin West Coast	Then passed to Avanti West Coast on 8 December 2019.	September 2027
East Midlands	Midland Mainline	Then passed to Stagecoach operating as East Midlands Trains. Then operated by East Midlands Railway.	December 2027
Great Western	Great Western Trains	Then bought by FirstGroup, renamed First Great Western in 1998, and later Great Western Railway in 2015. Also operates the Night Riviera.	December 2026
Gatwick Express	Gatwick Express	Merged into the Thameslink, Southern and Great Northern franchise and now a sub-brand	Yes
Cross Country	Virgin CrossCountry	Then passed to Arriva UK Trains operating as CrossCountry.	2027
Great Eastern	Anglia Railways	Merged into National Express East Anglia, passed to Abellio Greater Anglia in 2012	Yes
Caledonian Sleeper	Operated by ScotRail (National Express)	Operated by Caledonian Sleeper as a standalone franchise since 31 March 2015, formerly a sub-brand of ScotRail from 31 March 1997 to 31 March 2015.	None

== InterCity railtours ==
The train operating company Locomotive Services Limited purchased the InterCity name for use of its numerous programmes of electric-worked or occasional diesel railtours.

An InterCity-liveried set of first-class Mark 3 coaches, including a matching DVT, is hauled regularly by several electric locomotives representing Classes 86, 87, 89 and 90. Most diesel-hauled trains use locomotives which are not painted in InterCity livery.

== See also ==
- Network SouthEast
- Regional Railways
- Inter-city rail in the United Kingdom.
