= Hitrino train derailment =

2016 railway incident in Bulgaria

Coordinates: 43.4262°N 26.9093°E

- Location of Shumen Province in Bulgaria

Details
- Date: 10 December 2016; 05:37 EET (03:37 UTC)
- Location: Hitrino, Shumen Province
- Country: Bulgaria
- Line: Varna-Ruse line
- Operator: Bulmarket
- Incident type: Train Derailment
- Cause: Under investigation

Statistics
- Trains: 1 (2 locomotives, 26 tank cars)
- Crew: 3
- Deaths: 7
- Injured: 29
- Damage: ~ 20 houses destroyed, ~ 3 000 windows destroyed

On 10 December 2016, a freight train derailed, exploded and caught fire in the village of Hitrino in Shumen Province, Bulgaria, killing at least seven people and injuring 29 others.

== Derailment ==
At 05:37 local time (03:37 UTC) on 10 December 2016, a Bulmarket freight train travelling from Burgas to Ruse derailed in Hitrino, Shumen Province, Bulgaria. The train had changed direction of travel in Karnobat and Sindel, and had passed through Aytos, Velichkovo, Dalgopol, Provadiya, Kaspichan, Pliska, Velino. Upon entering the area of the railway station, according to the order of the on-duty railway traffic manager, the train was diverted to a side (parallel to the main) track- presumably in order to free the main track which had to be temporarily used by an oncoming train coming from the railway station of Samuel. The Kaspichan-Samuel-Ruse railway is a single line. The train was supposed to pass through the diverting element of the railway arrow at a speed of up to 40 km/h (27 miles/hour), but actually passed at 78 km/h (52 miles/hour). The train company specializes in transport of fuels over rail and road. Two of the wagons, which were carrying propane-butane and propylene, struck a power line pole, exploded and caught fire, engulfing at least fifty buildings, one of which collapsed, trapping several children. The three train drivers (two in the lead and the third driver in the second electric locomotive) survived the accident. Seven people were killed and 29 injured. An evacuation of the village was ordered as 150 firefighters fought the blaze; it was extinguished by midday. The injured were taken to hospitals in Shumen and Varna; some of them had sustained burns to 90% of their bodies.

It was reported that sparks had been seen coming from the locomotive of the train immediately before it derailed, possibly indicative of heavy braking.

== Background ==
The incident occurred on the oldest railway line in Bulgaria, connecting the country's main riverine port on the Danube in the city of Ruse and the main port on the Black Sea in Varna. The line was built during Ottoman rule by British private investors in the 1860s. The railway station in Hitrino (then called Sheitandzhik) was also the site of the first railway accident in Bulgaria in May 1867.

The train operator Bulmarket Rail Cargo was founded in 2004 and in the same year acquired a license for railway operations. It operates second-hand Danish (Class 86) and British (Class 87) electric locomotives like those involved in the incident (lead locomotive nr.86.003 and second locomotive nr.87.025), as its mainline motive rolling stock, as well as diesel-hydraulic locomotives for shunting duties. Bulmarket DM, the mother corporation of Bulmarket Rail Cargo, has its headquarters and main base of operations, with its own railway yard, Bulmarket Port and fuel storage facilities, in the city of Ruse.

== Investigation ==
Bulgaria's Chief Prosecutor opened an investigation into the accident. The owner of Bulmarket DM, Stanko Stankov, expressed his intention to involve an international team of railway incident experts from France, Germany and the Czech Republic to execute an independent investigation into the case. This was rebutted by the Attorney General's Office; it issued a statement that according to Bulgarian law such an investigation has absolutely no legal basis and justification, because the Attorney General's Office (Главна Прокуратура) and its special division for investigation of severe crimes and incidents — the National Inquiry Service (Национална Следствена Служба) — are the only legal bodies authorized by the country's laws to execute such investigations. On that basis, the police authorities guarding the perimeter denied access to the crash site to technical experts involved by the train operator. Residents were not allowed into their homes as a state of emergency was declared, but volunteers were allowed to be in Hitrino. Bullmarket DM also had to remove cisterns within 15 days.

According to the State Agency for National Security (semi-autonomous agency within the Bulgarian Ministry of the Interior, tasked with counter-terrorism, counter-espionage and high-profile corruption cases) the probable trigger for the incident was a railroad switch that had not been properly secured.

The investigators from the National Inquiry Service of the Attorney General's Office found that upon derailment at the railroad switch a crash between the fifth and sixth tank wagons led to the towing hook of one of them causing a rupture in the lower frontal part of the gas tank of the other. The discharged gas fumes from the liquid gas reached a bakery located in immediate proximity to the railway station, and its furnaces ignited them, causing the violent explosion. According to ammunition experts, the chain of events led to an equivalent of an oversized thermobaric weapon with blasting energy four to five times greater than the TNT-equivalent.

The court investigation concluded that the cause of the accident was human error, citing multiple issues, but ultimately held the train drivers responsible for driving the train at almost twice the permitted speed, directly causing the derailment. The main driver received a 15-year prison sentence, and the co-driver received 10 years in prison.

== Reactions ==
Bulgarian Prime Minister Boyko Borisov visited the scene. He called for people to donate blood as there was a shortage in the local hospitals. Local response alleviated the shortages. Bulgarian Transport Minister Ivaylo Moskovski also visited the site, along with top rail officials. A national day of mourning was declared for 12 December 2016.

The Bulgarian Government announced that a fund of 10 million leva (€5.1 million) was to be made available following a special Cabinet meeting on 12 December. The money would be distributed in two ways: 5 million leva (€2.55 million) would go to the Hitrino Municipality, and the other 5 million leva (€2.55 million) would go to the Labour and Social Policy Ministry. The Interior Ministry stated that people who had lost identity documents, passports and driving licences in the fire would have them replaced free of charge.

== See also ==
- 2008 Chelopechene explosions
- 2014 Gorni Lom explosions
- List of explosions
- List of rail accidents (2010–2019)
- Viareggio train derailment
