= List of British Rail Class 87 locomotives =

Details of a British class of electric locomotives

This article gives a list of all 36 British Rail Class 87 locomotives.

Pre-TOPS numbers E3201–34 were allocated to the first 34 locomotives, but these were never carried. Initially, the locomotive names fell into four categories: historical locomotives on the West Coast Main Line or nearby, major population centres on the route, significant figures in British history, or the works of Sir Walter Scott.

Key to colours
Preserved	Scrapped	Exported from the UK	Stored

List of locomotives
TOPS number	EVN	Date into traffic	Name (date)	Disposition	Notes	Image	Commons link
87001		June 1973	Stephenson (14 January 1976 – July 1977) (Note: 87001 named STEPHENSON at London Euston in 1976.); Royal Scot (14 July 1977–1998) (Note: 87001 named Royal Scot at Manchester Piccadilly in 1977.); Royal Scot (1999-2003); STEPHENSON (2003–present); Royal Scot (2005–present)	Preserved by the National Railway Museum, York, in 2005.	Name used previously on Royal Scot Class 46100.		Category:British Rail Class 87 87001 on Wikimedia Commons
87002		June 1973	Royal Sovereign (4 July 1978 – 2003); The AC Locomotive Group (2005-2008); Royal Sovereign (2008–present)	Preserved by the AC Locomotive Group between 2008 and 2019; now owned by Locomotive Services Limited. Operational.	Last Class 87 withdrawn by Virgin Trains. Name previously used on GWR 3031 Class no. 3050		Category:British Rail Class 87 87002 on Wikimedia Commons
87003	91 52 0087 003-7	July 1973	Patriot (1978-2005)	Exported in 2009; now owned by the Bulgarian Railway Company, as 87003-0.	Name used previously on LMS Patriot Class no. 45500		Category:British Rail Class 87 87003 (EVN 91 52 0087 003-7) on Wikimedia Commons
87004	91 52 0087 004-5	July 1973	Britannia (3 April 1978 – 2005) (Note: 87004 named Britannia at Crewe in 1978.); Britannia (2009-present)	Exported in 2009; now owned by Bulgarian Railway Company, as 87004-8.	Name used previously on Britannia Class no. 70000		Category:British Rail Class 87 87004 (EVN 91 52 0087 004-5) on Wikimedia Commons
87005		August 1973	City of London (22 November 1977 – 2003)	Scrapped in 10/2005 at JT Landscapes, MoD Caerwent.	First Class 87 withdrawn by Virgin Trains. Name used previously on LMS Princess Coronation Class no. 46245, GWR 3700 Class no. 3439 and LNER Class B17 no. 61670.		Category:British Rail Class 87 87005 on Wikimedia Commons
87006	91 52 0087 006-0	November 1973	City of Glasgow (8 December 1977 – 1987); Glasgow Garden Festival (April 1987 – January 1989); City of Glasgow (1989-1997); George Reynolds (1997-2004) (Note: 87006 renamed George Reynolds in 1997, after the former ScotRail press officer and InterCity public affairs manager.)	Exported in 2009; now owned by the Bulgarian Railway Company, as 87006-3.	Name used previously on LMS Princess Coronation Class no. 46242.		Category:British Rail Class 87 87006 (EVN 91 52 0087 006-0) on Wikimedia Commons
87007	91 52 0087 007-8	October 1973	City of Manchester (1 November 1977 – 2004)	Exported in 2008; now owned by the Bulgarian Railway Company, as 87007-1.	Name used previously on LMS Princess Coronation Class no. 46246.		Category:British Rail Class 87 87007 (EVN 91 52 0087 007-8) on Wikimedia Commons
87008		November 1973	City of Liverpool (29 November 1977 – 1998); Royal Scot (1998-1999); City of Liverpool (1999-2004)	Exported in 2008; now owned by the Bulgarian Railway Company, as 87008-9.	Name used previously on LMS Princess Coronation Class no. 46247. Stored at Ruse.		Category:British Rail Class 87 87008 on Wikimedia Commons
87009	91 52 0087 009-4	November 1973	City of Birmingham (29 November 1977 – 2003)	Exported in 2012; now owned by Bulmarket.	Name used previously on LMS Princess Coronation Class 46235 and GWR 3700 Class no. 3434.		Category:British Rail Class 87 87009 (EVN 91 52 0087 009-4) on Wikimedia Commons
87010	91 52 0087 010-2	December 1973	King Arthur (6 June 1978 – 2005); Driver Tommy Farr (2005-2005)	Exported in 2008; now owned by the Bulgarian Railway Company, as 87010-5.	Name used previously on LSWR N15 Class no. 30453.		Category:British Rail Class 87 87010 (EVN 91 52 0087 010-2) on Wikimedia Commons
87011		January 1974	The Black Prince (15 May 1978 – 1998); City of Wolverhampton (2001-2004)	Scrapped in 2010 at EMR Kingsbury	Name used previously on Britannia Class no. 70008		Category:British Rail Class 87 87011 on Wikimedia Commons
87012	91 52 0087 012-0	January 1974	Coeur de Lion (25 May 1978 – November 1984); The Royal Bank of Scotland (1988-1998); Coeur de Lion (2001-2005); The Olympian (2005-2006)	Exported in 2007; now owned by the Bulgarian Railway Company, as 87012-1.	Original name used previously on Britannia Class no. 70007 on GWR Saint Class no. 2980 and, before that, on a GWR Waverley Class broad gauge locomotive.		Category:British Rail Class 87 87012 (EVN 91 52 0087 012-0) on Wikimedia Commons
87013	91 52 0087 013-6	February 1974	John O' Gaunt (14 March 1978 – 1998) (Note: 87013 named John o' Gaunt at Lancaster in 1978.); John O' Gaunt (2000-2004)	Exported in 2009; now owned by the Bulgarian Railway Company, as 87013-6	Name used previously on Britannia Class no. 70012		Category:British Rail Class 87 87013 (EVN 91 52 0087 013-6) on Wikimedia Commons
87014		January 1974	Knight of the Thistle (16 May 1978 – 2004)	Exported in 2009; now owned by the Bulgarian Railway Company, as 87014-7	Name used previously on LNER A3 Class no. 60065 and GWR Star Class no. 4012. Stored at Sofia.		Category:British Rail Class 87 87014 on Wikimedia Commons
87015		February 1974	Howard of Effingham (12 May 1978 – 2005)	Scrapped in 10/2005 at JT Landscapes, MoD Caerwent.	Name used previously on SR Lord Nelson Class no. 30854 and LMS Jubilee Class no. 45670.		
87016		March 1974	Sir Francis Drake (28 April 1978 – 1988); Willesden InterCity Depot (1992-2004)	Scrapped in 12/2004 at JT Landscapes, MoD Caerwent.	First Class 87/0 to be scrapped. Name used previously on SR Lord Nelson Class no. 30851		Category:British Rail Class 87 87016 on Wikimedia Commons
87017	91 52 0087 017-7	March 1974	Iron Duke (30 May 1978 – 2004); Iron Duke (2011-present)	Exported in 2009; now owned by Bulmarket.	Name used previously on Britannia Class no. 70014		Category:British Rail Class 87 87017 (EVN 91 52 0087 017-7) on Wikimedia Commons
87018		May 1974	Lord Nelson (9 March 1978 – 2004) (Note: 87018 named Lord Nelson at Liverpool Lime Street in 1978.)	Scrapped in 2010 at JT Landscapes, MoD Caerwent.	Name used previously on SR Lord Nelson Class no. 30850		Category:British Rail Class 87 87018 on Wikimedia Commons
87019	91 52 0087 019-3	March 1974	Sir Winston Churchill (3 May 1978 – 2005); ACoRP Association of Community Rail Partnerships (2005-2006)	Exported in 2009; now owned by Bulgarian Railway Company, as 87019-6.	Name used previously on SR Battle of Britain Class no. 34051		Category:British Rail Class 87 87019 (EVN 91 52 0087 019-3) on Wikimedia Commons
87020	91 52 0087 020-1	March 1974	North Briton (19 May 1978 – 2004)	Exported in 2009; now owned by Bulgarian Railway Company, as 87020-4			Category:British Rail Class 87 87020 (EVN 91 52 0087 020-1) on Wikimedia Commons
87021		April 1974	Robert the Bruce (12 June 1978 – 2005)	Scrapped in 2010 at JT Landscapes, MoD Caerwent.	Name used previously on LNER A2 Class no. 60510		Category:British Rail Class 87 87021 on Wikimedia Commons
87022	91 52 0087 022-7	April 1974	Cock o' the North (30 June 1978 – 1998); Lew Adams - The Black Prince (1998-2004); Cock o' the North (2006-2007)	Exported in 2009; now owned by Bulgarian Railway Company, as 87022-0.	Original name used previously on LNER A2 Class no. 60501. Suffered a serious fire, December 2013.		Category:British Rail Class 87 87022 (EVN 91 52 0087 022-7) on Wikimedia Commons
87023	91 52 0087 023-5	April 1974	Highland Chieftain (3 July 1978 – November 1982); Velocity (1985-2000); Polmadie (2000-2005); Velocity (2011–present)	Exported in 2012; now owned by Bulmarket.	Original name used previously on LNER A2 Class no. 60507		Category:British Rail Class 87 87023 (EVN 91 52 0087 023-5) on Wikimedia Commons
87024		April 1974	Lord of the Isles (24 May 1978 – 2004)	Scrapped in 11/2005 at JT Landscapes, MoD Caerwent.	Name used previously on LNER K1 Class no. 61996		Category:British Rail Class 87 87024 on Wikimedia Commons
87025	91 52 0087 025-0	April 1974	Borderer (1978-1982); County of Cheshire (29 November 1982 – 2004). (Note: 87025 was named County of Cheshire on 29 November 1982 at Crewe, by councillor Roy Hinks, chairman of Cheshire County Council.)	Exported in 2012; now owned by Bulmarket.	Original name used previously on LNER A1 Class no. 60155		Category:British Rail Class 87 87025 (EVN 91 52 0087 025-0) on Wikimedia Commons
87026	91 52 0087 026-8	May 1974	Redgauntlet (19 May 1978 – October 1982).; Sir Richard Arkwright (12 October 1982 – 2004) (Note: 87026 was named Sir Richard Arkwright on 12 October 1982, by the Duke of Devonshire at Preston.)	Exported in 2009; now owned by the Bulgarian Railway Company, as 87026-1.	Original name used previously on North British Railway J Class no. 62402 and on LNER A1 Class no. 60137.		Category:British Rail Class 87 87026 (EVN 91 52 0087 026-8) on Wikimedia Commons
87027		May 1974	Wolf of Badenoch (18 May 1978 – 2003)	Scrapped in 2010 at EMR Kingsbury.	Used as a source of spare parts for the export programme. Name used previously on LNER A2 Class no. 60506.		Category:British Rail Class 87 87027 on Wikimedia Commons
87028	91 52 0087 028-4	May 1974	Lord President (9 May 1978 – 2003); Lord President (2006-2007)	Exported in 2009; now owned by the Bulgarian Railway Company, as 87028-7.	Name used previously on LNER A2 Class no. 60503		Category:British Rail Class 87 87028 (EVN 91 52 0087 028-4) on Wikimedia Commons
87029	91 52 0087 029-2	June 1974	Earl Marischal (26 June 1978 – 2004)	Exported in 2009; now owned by the Bulgarian Railway Company, as 87029-5	Name used previously on LNER A2 Class no. 60502		Category:British Rail Class 87 87029 (EN 91 52 0087 029-2) on Wikimedia Commons
87030		June 1974	Black Douglas (10 July 1978 – 2005)	Scrapped in 2010 at EMR Kingsbury.			Category:British Rail Class 87 87030 on Wikimedia Commons
87031		July 1974	Hal o' the Wynd (8 June 1978 – 2004); Keith Harper (2004-2005)	Scrapped in 2010 at EMR Kingsbury.	Name used previously on LNER A1 Class 60116, before that on North British Railway J Class 363.		Category:British Rail Class 87 87031 on Wikimedia Commons
87032		July 1974	Kenilworth (9 May 1978 – 2003); Richard Fearn (2003-2004)	Scrapped in 2010 at EMR Kingsbury.	Name used previously on LNER A1 Class 60124, before that on North British Railway J Class no. 422.		Category:British Rail Class 87 87032 on Wikimedia Commons
87033	91 52 0087 033-4	August 1974	Thane of Fife (30 May 1978 – 2005)	Exported in 2009; now owned by the Bulgarian Railway Company, as 87033-7	Name used previously on LNER A2 Class no. 60505		Category:British Rail Class 87 87033 (EVN 91 52 0087 033-4) on Wikimedia Commons
87034	91 52 0087 034-2	September 1974	William Shakespeare (16 May 1978 – 2003). (Note: 87034 named William Shakespeare at Birmingham International in 1978.)	Exported in 2009; now owned by the Bulgarian Railway Company, as 87034-5.	Name used previously on Britannia Class no. 70004		Category:British Rail Class 87 87034 (EVN 91 52 0087 034-2) on Wikimedia Commons
87035		October 1974	Robert Burns (13 April 1978 – present). (Note: 87035 named Robert Burns at Glasgow Central in 1978.)	Preserved by the Crewe Heritage Centre.	Name used previously on Britannia Class no. 70006		Category:British Rail Class 87 87035 on Wikimedia Commons
87101		January 1977	STEPHENSON (12 October 1977 - 2002) (Note: 87101 named STEPHENSON at Manchester Piccadilly in 1977.)	Scrapped in 2/2002 by HNRC at Barrow Hill Roundhouse.	Originally numbered 87 036. Used for research from 1975 to late 1976; entered regular service in January 1977. Name used previously on LMS Patriot Class no. 45529 and SR N15X class no. 32329; also carried by 87001 from 1/76-7/77. The control equipment has been preserved by the AC Locomotive Group.		Category:British Rail Class 87 87101 on Wikimedia Commons
