= EA class =

EA class or Class EA may refer to:

- DSB Class EA, electric locomotives
- KUR EA class, 2-8-2 steam locomotives
- New Zealand EA class locomotive, electric locomotives
