= Trem =

- TREM1, a triggering receptor expressed on myeloid cells 1, a human gene
- TREM2, a triggering receptor expressed on myeloid cells 2, a human gene
- Trem Desportivo Clube
- Trem da Alegria, children musical band in Brazil
- Trem das Onze, classical samba composition by Brazilian singer Adoniran Barbosa
- Tremulous, a popular free and open source FPS video game.
- Trace rare-earth element
- The highest point of the Suva Planina mountain range in Serbia
- Trem (village), a village in Hitrino Municipality, Shumen Province, Bulgaria.
