= Georg Frederik Ursin =

Danish mathematician and astronomer

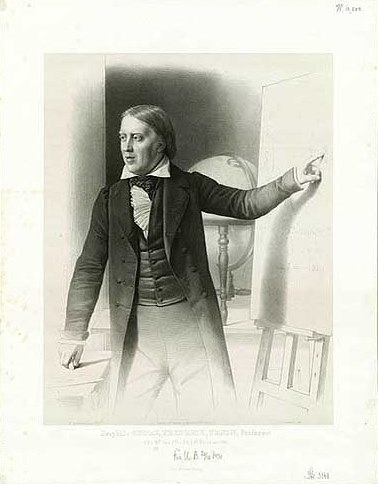
- Posthumous litograph
- Born: 22 June 1797; Copenhagen, Denmark
- Died: 4 December 1849 (aged 52); Copenhagen, Denmark
- Occupation: Mathematician
- Spouse: Helene Elisabeth de Thurah
- Parent: Georg Jacob Krüger

Georg Frederik Krüger Ursin (22 June 1797 – 4 December 1849) was a Danish mathematician and astronomer.

== Early life ==
His father, Georg Jacob Krüger, was a first lieutenant in the Royal Danish Navy, however, in 1798, his was stripped of his functions where was taken to Munkholmen, an islet north of Trondheim, Norway.

In the same year, Ursin was given royal license to carry the maternal family name from his mother, Jacobine Ursin (1772–1819), daughter of rear admiral Ursin, married to a wealthy shipbuilder and shipyard owner Lars Larsen.

== Education ==
In 1814, Ursin passed an exam in land surveying before graduating cum laude from Metropolitanskolen in 1815. Having won a prize assignment involving regular polyhedron, he passed a second exam cum laude.

== Death and legacy ==
Ursin died on December 4, 1849, in Copenhagen.

A DSB Class EA locomotive no. 3020 is named after Ursin.
