= Hitrino =

Hitrino Хитрино
- Location of Hitrino
- Coordinates: 43.4260°N 26.9174°E
- Country: Bulgaria
- Provinces (Oblast): Shumen

Government
  - Mayor: Nuridin Ismail (PP-DB)
- Elevation: 273 m (896 ft)

Population (2021)
  - Total: 5,654
- Time zone: UTC+2 (EET)
  - Summer (DST): UTC+3 (EEST)
- Postal Code: 9780
- Area code: 05341

Hitrino (Bulgarian: Хитрино, pronounced [ˈxitrino]) is a village in northeastern Bulgaria, part of Shumen Province. It is the administrative centre of the homonymous Hitrino Municipality, which lies in the northwestern part of the province.

Hitrino is located in the northeastern Ludogorie region, equally outlying from the Black Sea and the Danube, 20 kilometres from the provincial capital of Shumen. The village has a railway station on the Varna-Rousse line and lies on the main road between Silistra and Shumen.

== History ==
The name of the village up until 1934 is Шейтанджик ( Sheitandjik ).

Hitrino was almost entirely populated by local Turkish people as a big part of it emigrated to Turkey during the so-called Revival Process.

"Ludogorie" was founded in Hitrino in 1949.

On 23 January 1955 the machine-tractor station in Hitrino is opened.

A Municipal pioneer home "Живко Гергански ( Jivko Gerganski )" was made near the railway station in the village. It includes 31 pioneer battalions.

== Municipality ==
Hitrino municipality includes the following 21 places:

- Baykovo
- Bliznatsi
- Cherna
- Dlazhko
- Dobri Voynikovo
- Edinakovtsi
- Hitrino
- Iglika
- Kalino
- Kamenyak
- Razvigorovo
- Slivak
- Stanovets
- Studenitsa
- Tervel
- Timarevo
- Trem
- Varbak
- Visoka Polyana
- Zhivkovo
- Zvegor

== 2016 train accident ==
At 5:40 am local time (03:40 GMT), on 10 December 2016, 7 people were killed and 29 were injured following the explosion of a derailed tanker train. The train, which was carrying propane-butane and propylene, struck an electricity pylon, exploded and caught fire. The fire engulfed at least fifty buildings, one of which collapsed trapping some children. 20 buildings in Hitrino were destroyed.

An evacuation of the village was ordered as 150 firefighters fought the blaze; it was extinguished by midday. The injured were taken to hospitals in Shumen and Varna. Some of them sustained burns to 90% of their body.

Bulgarian Prime Minister Boyko Borisov, visited the village several hours after the blast.

== Honours ==
Hitrino Ridge in Antarctica is named after the village.
