= British Rail Class 87 =

Class of British electric locomotives

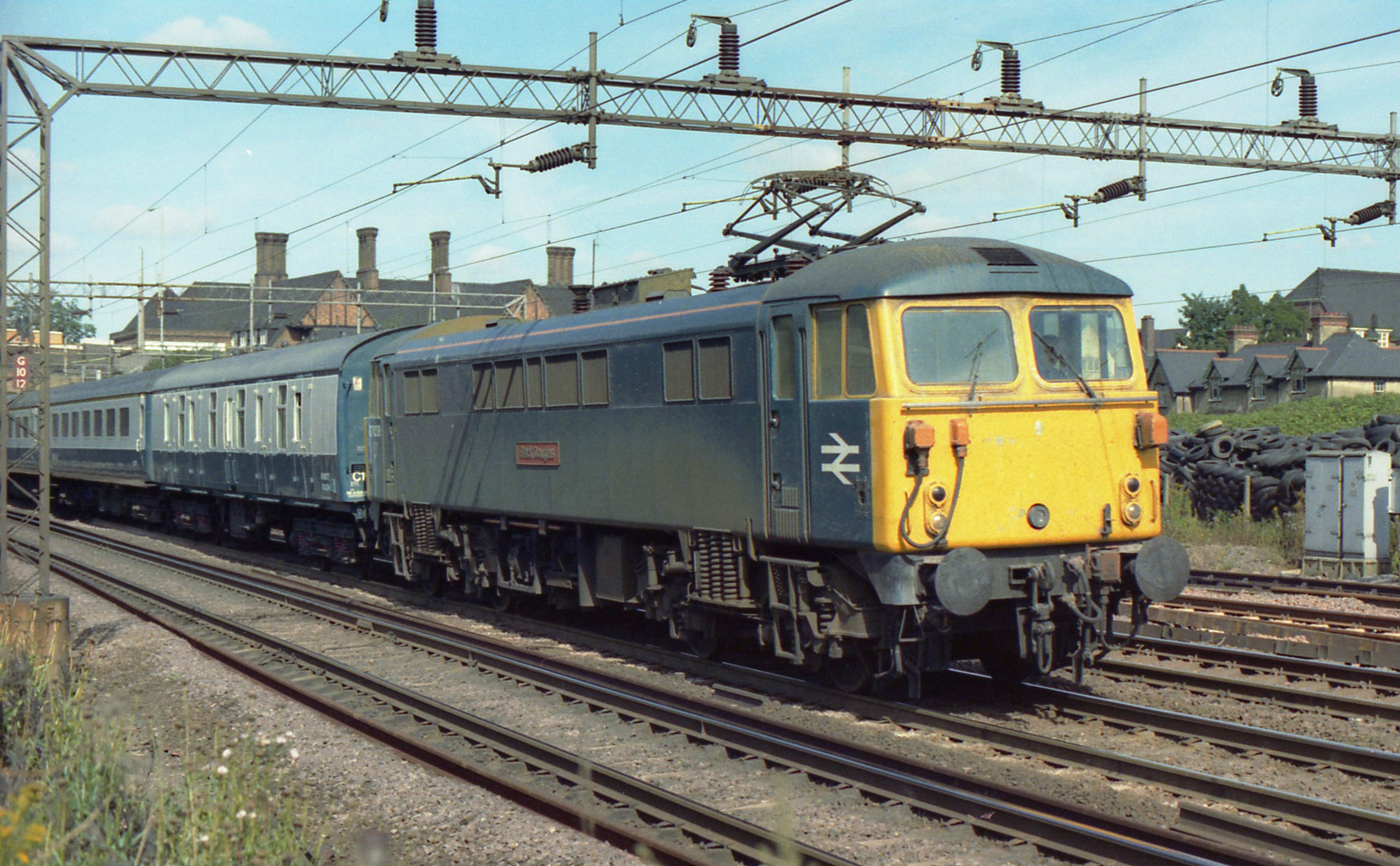
- A Class 87 at Kenton in 1979
Type and origin
- Power type: Electric
- Builder: British Rail Engineering Limited Crewe Works
- Build date: 1973–1975
- Total produced: 36
Specifications
- Configuration
  - UIC: Bo′Bo′
- Gauge: 4 ft 8 1/2 in (1,435 mm) standard gauge
- Bogies: BP9
- Wheel diameter: 3 ft 9 1/2 in (1.156 m)
- Minimum curve: 80 m (4 chains)
- Wheelbase: 43 ft 6 1/8 in (13.262 m)
  - Bogie: 10 ft 9 in (3.280 m)
- Pivot centres: 32 ft 9 in (9.98 m)
- Length
  - Over beams: 58 ft 6 in (17.83 m)
- Width: 8 ft 8 1/4 in (2.648 m) (over body)
- Height
  - Pantograph: 13 ft 1 1/4 in (3.994 m)
  - Body height: 12 ft 4 1/4 in (3.766 m)
- Axle load: 19 long tons 13 cwt (20.0 t)
- Loco weight: 80 long tons (81 t; 90 short tons)
- Electric system/s: 25 kV AC Catenary
- Current pickup: Brecknell Willis high speed pantograph
- Traction motors: 4 × 1,250 hp (930 kW) GEC G412AZ (87/0); 4 × GEC G412BZ (87/1)
  - Rating 1 hour: 885A
- Gear ratio: 32:73
- MU working: TDM
- Train heating: Electric Train Heating index: 66; ETH index: 95 (87/0, later); ETH isolated (87/1, later)
- Loco brake: Air & Rheostatic
- Train brakes: Air
- Safety systems: AWS Train Protection & Warning System
Performance figures
- Maximum speed: 110 mph (180 km/h)
- Power output
  - 1 hour: 1,270 hp (950 kW) per motor
  - Continuous: 5,000 hp (3,700 kW) (87/0); 4,850 hp (3,620 kW) (87/1)
- Tractive effort
  - Starting: 43,000 lbf (191 kN)
  - Continuous: 21,300 lbf (94.7 kN) at 87 mph (140 km/h)
- Brakeforce: 40 long tons (41 t)
Career
- Operators: Current: Bulgarian Railway Company (2007–); Bulmarket (2012–); Locomotive Services Limited (2019–); Former: British Rail (1973–1997); Caledonian Sleeper (1997–1998, 2015–2019); Cotswold Rail (2005–2006); Direct Rail Services (2004–2005); EWS (1997–2002); First GBRf (2004–2007); Virgin Trains (1997–2006)
- Class: 87
- Number in class: 36
- Numbers: 87001–87035, 87101
- Axle load class: Route availability 6
- Locale: West Coast Main Line
- Withdrawn: 2002-2007
- Preserved: 87001, 87002, 87035
- Disposition: 3 preserved; 21 exported; 12 scrapped

The British Rail Class 87 is a type of electric locomotive designed and built by British Rail Engineering Limited (BREL) between 1973 and 1975. A total of thirty-six locomotives were constructed, to work passenger and freight services over the West Coast Main Line (WCML).

The type was developed in response to the need to add extra capacity to the electric traction fleet operated by British Rail (BR), in addition to the desire to introduce a higher performance electric locomotive than the existing Class 86, upon which the Class 87 was based. Class 87s were British Rail's flagship electric locomotives from their introduction until the late 1980s, at which point they began to be superseded by members of the newly developed Class 90 fleet – itself an improved derivative of the Class 87 design.

As a consequence of the privatisation of British Rail during the mid 1990s, all but one of the Class 87s were transferred to Virgin Trains. Under this operator, the type continued their passenger duties until the advent of the new Class 390 Pendolinos, after which they were gradually transferred to other operators or withdrawn between 2002 and 2007. For a time, the type was a staple of electrified freight operations, before it was displaced by the Class 90 in this capacity as well. By the end of the 2010s, there was only one Class 87 that remained in an operational condition in Britain, 87002, which had been initially preserved by the AC Locomotive Group and is presently owned by Locomotive Services Limited. It was previously in use with Serco Caledonian Sleeper and is intended for use on charter services. A large proportion of the fleet has been exported to Bulgaria, where they have entered regular use once again.

== History ==
=== Origins and development ===
A requirement for more electric locomotives came about in the early-1970s, when the decision was taken to extend electrification of the West Coast Main Line from Weaver Junction north of Crewe, to Preston, Carlisle and Glasgow Central. Extension of electrification to Glasgow was announced in March 1970, and completed on 6 May 1974, with the Class 87s being developed in conjunction with this scheme. Initially, three Class 86 locomotives (86101–86103) were used as test-beds to trial equipment (mainly electrical equipment and suspension) that would be used in the new locomotives. Effectively, these locomotives were Class 87s in everything but their appearance.

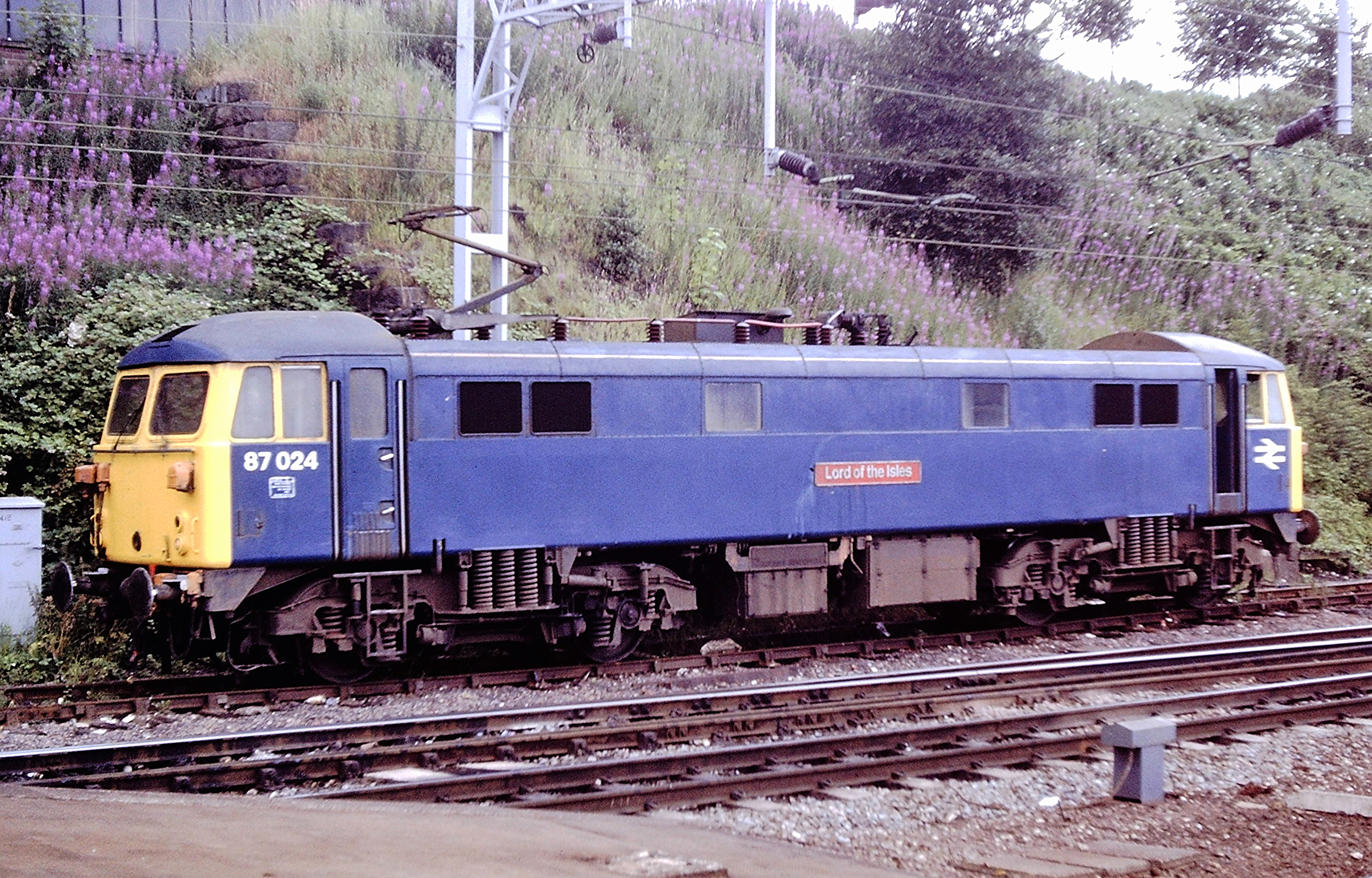
87024 Lord of the Isles at Coventry in 1986

The external appearance and layout of the Class 87 was closely based on that of the Class 86. The only major visual difference was that the 87 had two front cab windows, instead of the three of the 86, and also lacked a headcode indicator box; by 1973, visual recognition of train reporting numbers by signallers was no longer deemed to be necessary.

The Class 87s were higher performance locomotives than the preceding Class 86, with increased power and speed: power output was increased from 3,600 to 5,000 horsepower (2,685 to 3,728 kW) to deal with the more demanding gradients on the northern half of the WCML, such as Shap and Beattock Summit. The top speed was raised from 100 mph (160 km/h) to 110 mph (180 km/h), which is the fastest speed allowed on the West Coast Main Line for trains without a tilting mechanism.

The Class 87s were also fitted with multiple working equipment, which enabled locomotives to work with other members of the class, and some Class 86s, while controlled by one driver. During the 1980s, the original multiple working system was replaced with a newer system that was based on time-division multiplexing (TDM). The new apparatus enabled the Class 87 to work with various other classes of locomotives, including Class 86s, Class 90s and Class 91s. Perhaps even more importantly, the newer multiple working equipment had also enabled the type to work with the newly introduced Driving Van Trailers (DVTs).

==== 87101 ====
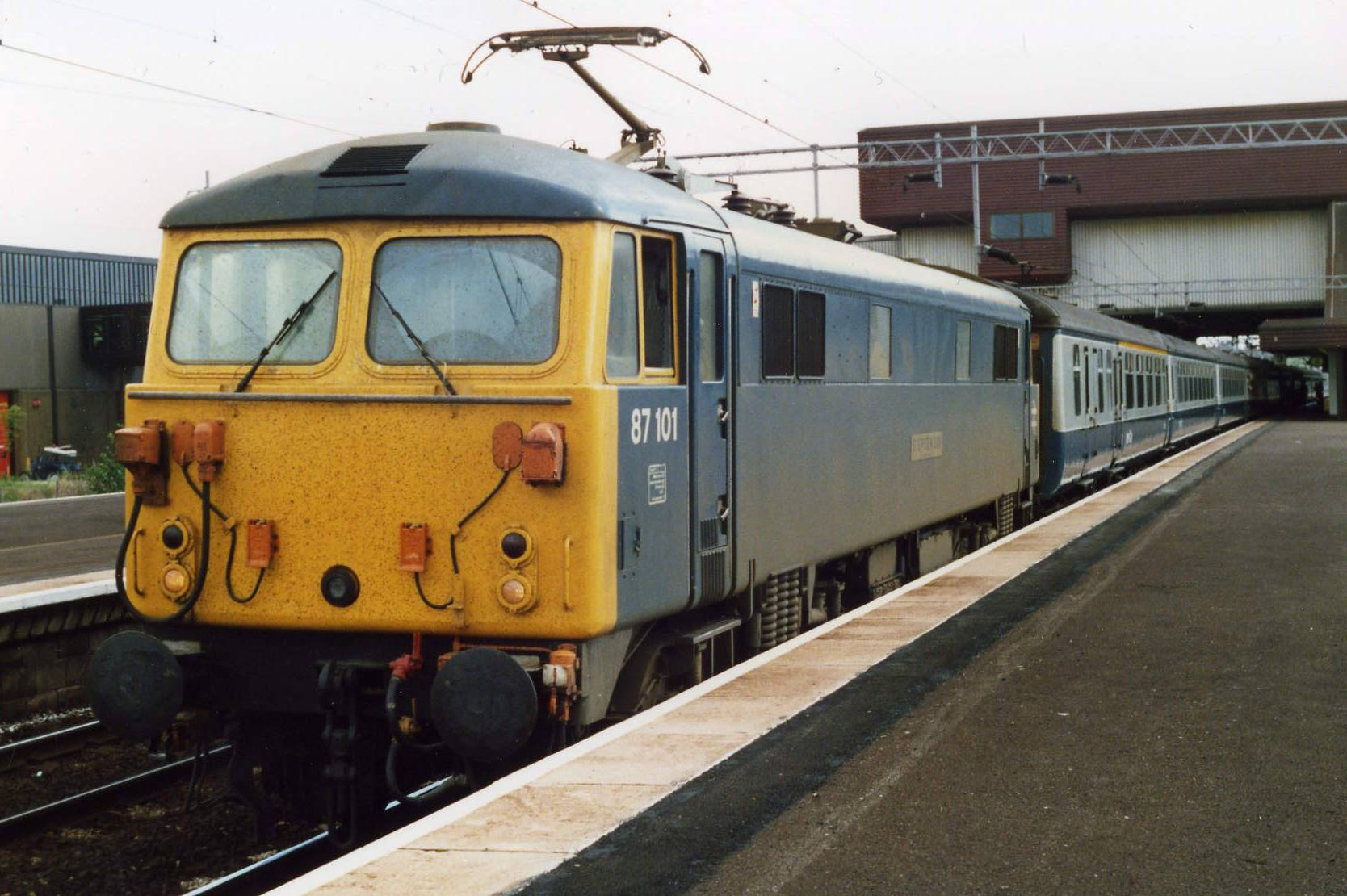
The unique Class 87/1, no. 87101 Stephenson, in blue livery at Birmingham International in 1988

Whilst the first 35 locomotives (numbered from 87001 to 87035, known as Class 87/0) were identical, the 36th and last member of the class, which was going to carry the number 87036 before entering traffic but was allocated 87101 instead, had major equipment differences from the rest of the class. While the 87/0s were fitted with a traditional tap changer transformer and rectifiers, 87101 had a new thyristor power control system and better anti-slip protection; it spent over a year on test before entering service in 1976.

It was reported that the locomotive's hauling ability was around 20% better than the 87/0s, a feature which made it particularly suitable for freight work. The locomotive, named Stephenson after transfer of the name from 87001, worked the same services as the standard locomotives for many years, until British Rail was sectorised in the 1980s. The locomotive was then transferred to Railfreight in 1989, to be used exclusively for freight work, and was limited to 75 mph (121 km/h).

As a freight locomotive, it was transferred to EWS and, after suffering a major failure, the locomotive was withdrawn in 1999. It was sold to the French train manufacturing company Alsthom, who used it as a source of spare parts for the remainder of the fleet before scrapping its remnants at Barrow Hill during January 2002; it was the first Class 87 to be withdrawn and scrapped. Some thyristor equipment has been preserved by AC Locomotive Group.

This locomotive was, in many respects, the prototype for later electric locomotives such as the Class 90 and Class 91.

=== Second batch ===
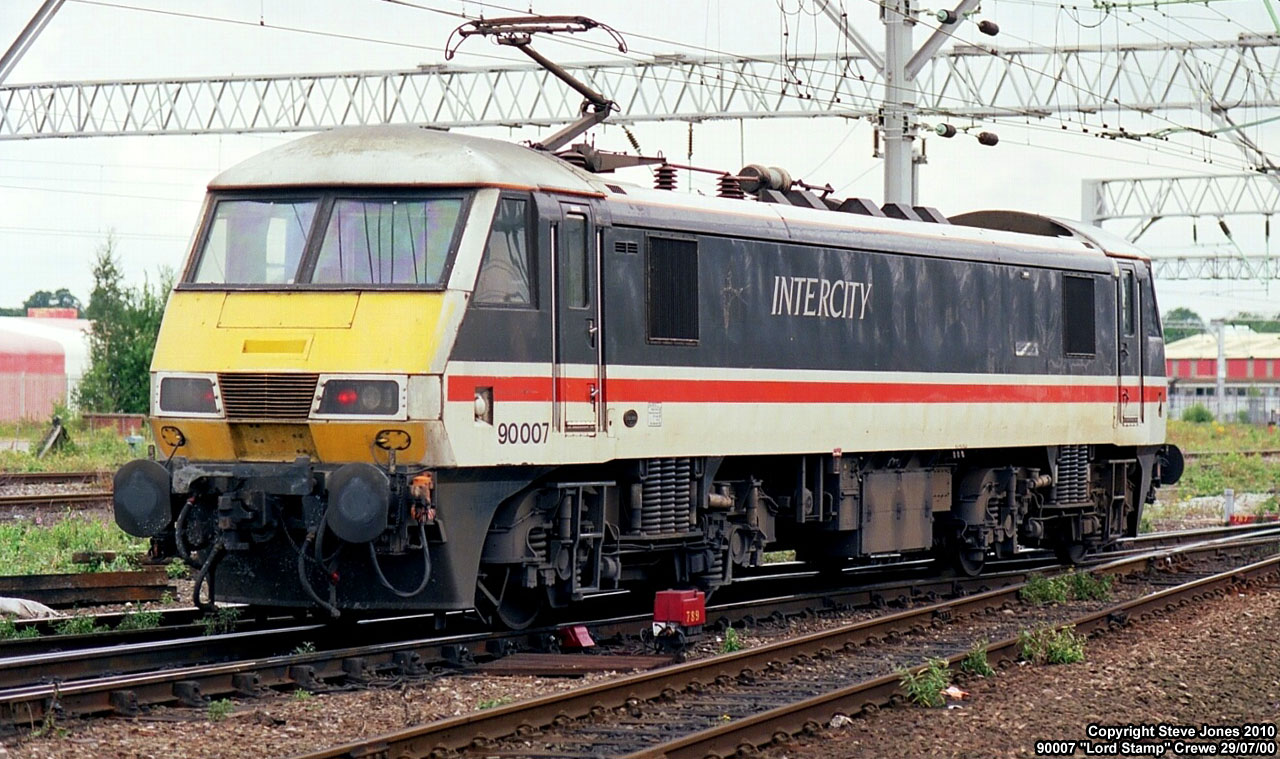
The Class 90s were a modernised derivative of the Class 87s, built in the late 1980s. They were originally designated as the Class 87/2

Throughout the 1970s and 1980s, BR undertook numerous schemes, including the electrification of the East Coast Main Line (ECML) and the ultimately-cancelled procurement of the Advanced Passenger Train (APT), (the latter being at one point intended to succeed the Class 87 as BR's next major InterCity express train) that had led to a significant nationwide shortage of electric traction. Various different efforts were launched during this era to alleviate this shortage, including an electrified version of the InterCity 125 (known as the HST-E), the Class 89 mixed-traffic locomotive and what would become the InterCity 225. It was clear that additional electric locomotives were necessary no matter what, as both the 1950s era Class 81 and Class 85 electric locomotives were nearing the end of their viable service lives and had become quite unreliable.

The Class 87 locomotives had proved to be capable and reliable since their introduction roughly one decade earlier, thus there was considerable interest procuring additional units as a low-cost option with virtually no risk for the West Coast Main Line (WCML). BREL issued its submission to produce an initial batch of 25 Class 87/2s, which quickly received a favourable reception. The BR board decided that it would curtail its plans to procure the InterCity 225 for the WCML and instead procure the Class 87/2 to haul its intended traffic. Accordingly, the procurement of the type was assured. This move meant that no InterCity 225s would ever be procured for the WCML.

Authorisation for building the locomotives was given in 1985. Originally conceived as an updated version of the Class 87, the type was initially designated as the Class 87/2 prior to their introduction, however as it became clear that they differed considerably in appearance, and in a number of technical aspects from the older Class 87 fleet, they were redesignated as the Class 90. A total of 50 Class 90 locomotives were manufactured by BREL at the Crewe Works from 1985 to 1990; these were numbered 90001-050.

== Service ==
=== British Rail ===
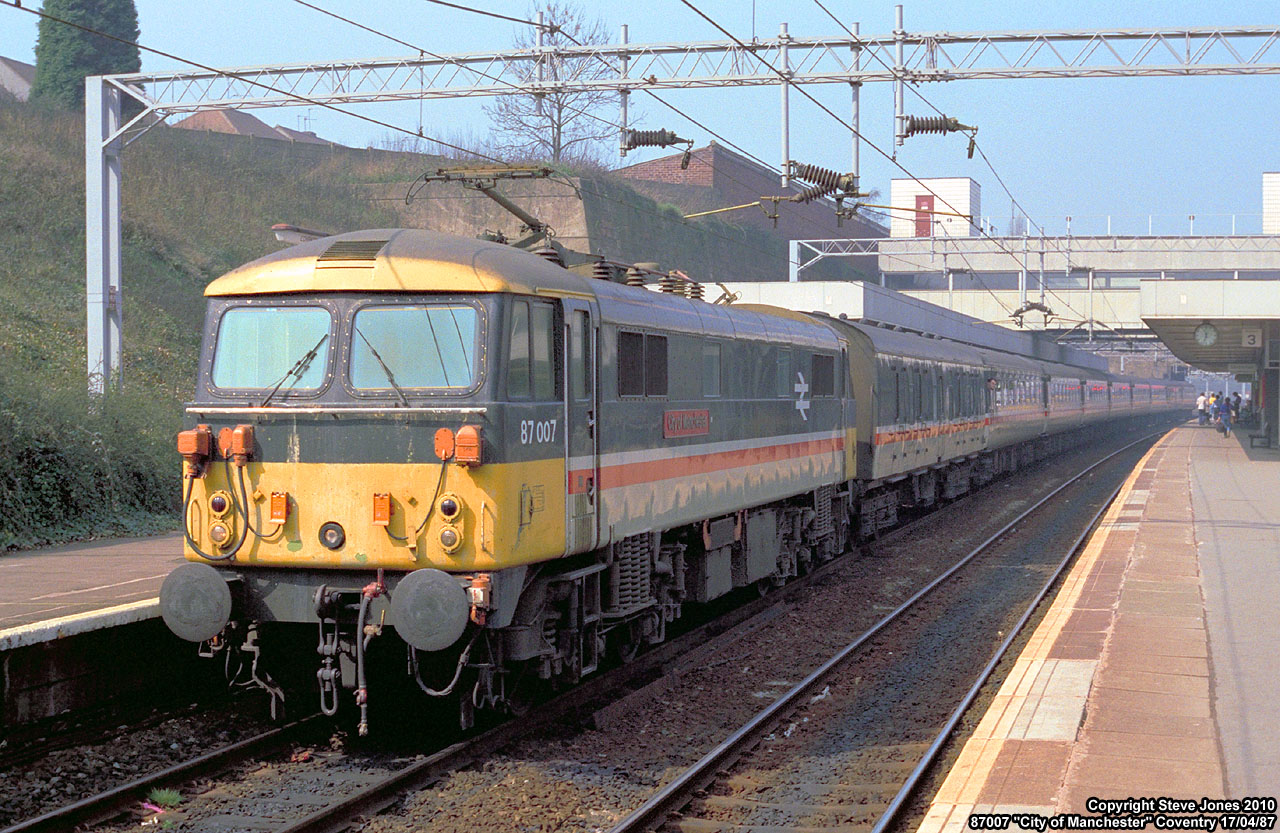
87007 "City of Manchester" at Coventry in InterCity livery in 1987

The first member of the class, 87001, entered service in June 1973 and deliveries continued until the last of the standard locomotives, 87035, entered service in October 1974. The unique 87101 was delivered in 1975 and was used for testing until it entered regular service in 1976. With the completion of the electrification to Glasgow in May 1974, the class 87s inaugurated the electric Anglo-Scottish services which they had been designed for, in doing so, they reduced the fastest London to Glasgow journey time by one hour, from six hours to five over the 401-mile (645 km) route. The majority of the Class 87s' workload came on express passenger services from London Euston to the North West of England and Glasgow; they were, however, also used for heavy freight work until the early-1990s, especially steel and other heavy commodities.

In 1976, 87001 was the first to be named as STEPHENSON. The following year, British Rail decided that, as the flagships of their Anglo-Scottish fleet, the Class 87s should become the new Royal Scot class. Many received names with an appropriate theme; 87001 became Royal Scot and the STEPHENSON name was transferred to 87101.

During the 1980s, British Rail locomotives were allocated to separate sectors: the standard 87s were transferred to the InterCity sector and the unique 87101 was assigned to Railfreight Distribution. This change eventually saw the end of freight work for most of the class, when InterCity gained full control of the standard fleet.

The class was originally painted in the then standard British Rail Blue livery; in the mid-to-late 1980s, the class was painted in various InterCity liveries. The exception was 87101, which received a Railfreight grey livery in the early-1990s.

=== Post-privatisation ===
==== Virgin Trains ====
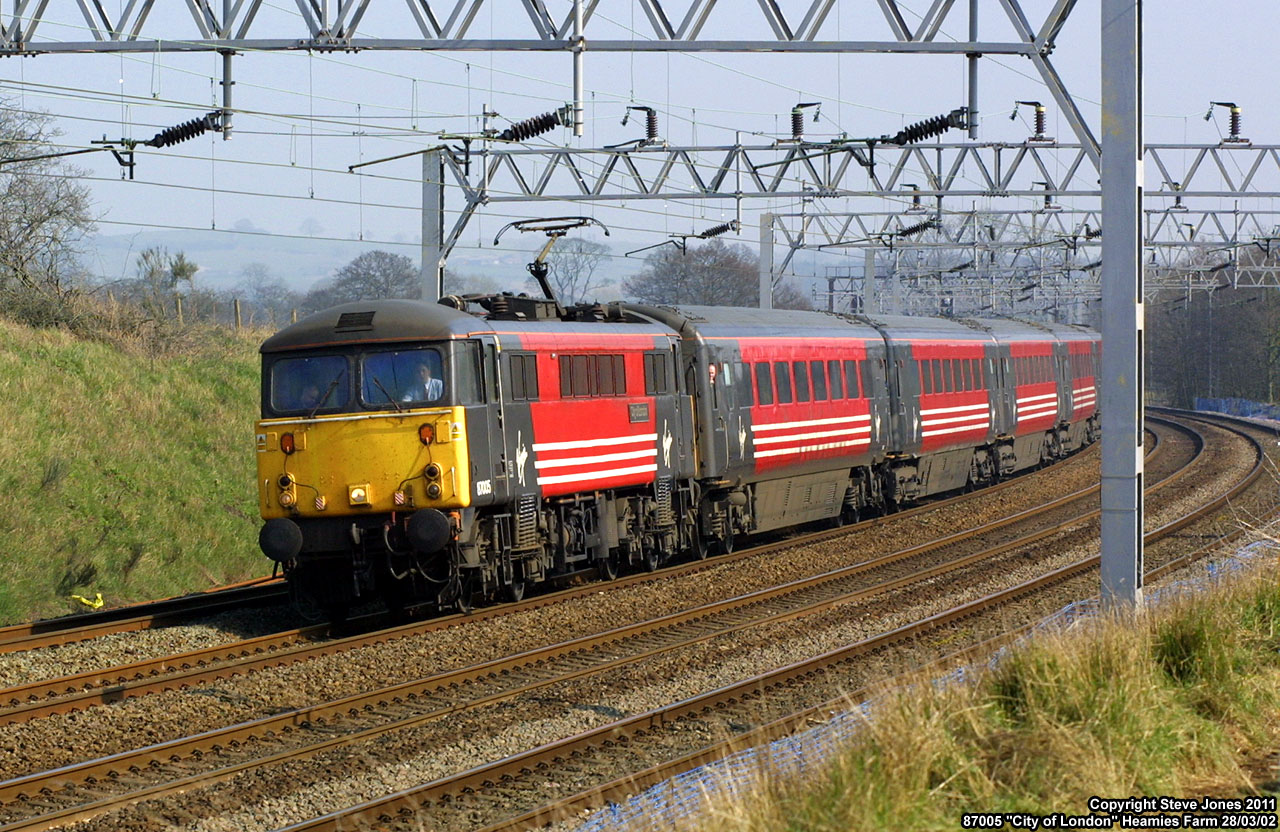
87005 City of London in 2002 in Virgin Trains' red and black livery.

As a consequence of the privatisation of British Rail, all 35 87/0s were passed to rolling stock leasing company Porterbrook and were leased to InterCity West Coast operator Virgin Trains in 1997. The locomotives continued to work the same services as before, the only outward indication of the change of ownership being the repainting of the locomotives in the red Virgin Trains livery. However, Virgin's policy of introducing a new fleet of trains to quickly replace the BR-era fleet that the firm had inherited inevitably meant that the writing was on the wall for the Class 87s.

As Pendolino deliveries began to come on stream from 2002 onward, 87005 City of London was the first locomotive taken out of service. Although withdrawals were slower than expected, due to the unreliability of the Pendolinos, the final day in service was set for 10 June 2005, by which time many locomotives had been withdrawn and others transferred to other operators. On this day, four locomotives hauled special trains to Wolverhampton, Northampton and Manchester. However, this turned out not to be the final workings for Virgin, as further problems with the new trains meant sporadic appearances by Class 87s hired from other operators. The final working, which was between London and Birmingham, eventually occurred on 22 December 2006; 87002 performing the honours.

==== English Welsh & Scottish Railway ====
English Welsh & Scottish inherited the unique 87101 from Railfreight Distribution. The locomotive was used infrequently on freight and charter trains, but suffered a major failure in 1999 and was withdrawn due to its non-standard nature. It was eventually sold to Alstom for spare parts and finally scrapped at Barrow Hill by Harry Needle Railroad Company in 2002.

==== Cotswold Rail ====
In April 2005, Cotswold Rail acquired five locomotives, all of which had been out of service for a number of months. A fleet of ten locomotives was planned for by the company, which were intended for duties such as spot-hire work, charter operations and a new intermodal freight flow. They were based at Oxley depot in Wolverhampton. However, the fleet saw very little use only two ever worked a train (87007 and 87008), both having been repainted into Cotswold Rail livery and in July 2006 the locomotives went off-lease.

==== Direct Rail Services ====
In November 2004, Direct Rail Services (DRS) acquired four locomotives. They were used on Anglo-Scottish intermodal services, but never on a regular basis. In June 2005, the four locomotives were stored. The main reason for their lack of use was the need for a diesel to shunt the train in non-electrified sidings.

==== First GBRf/GB Railfreight ====
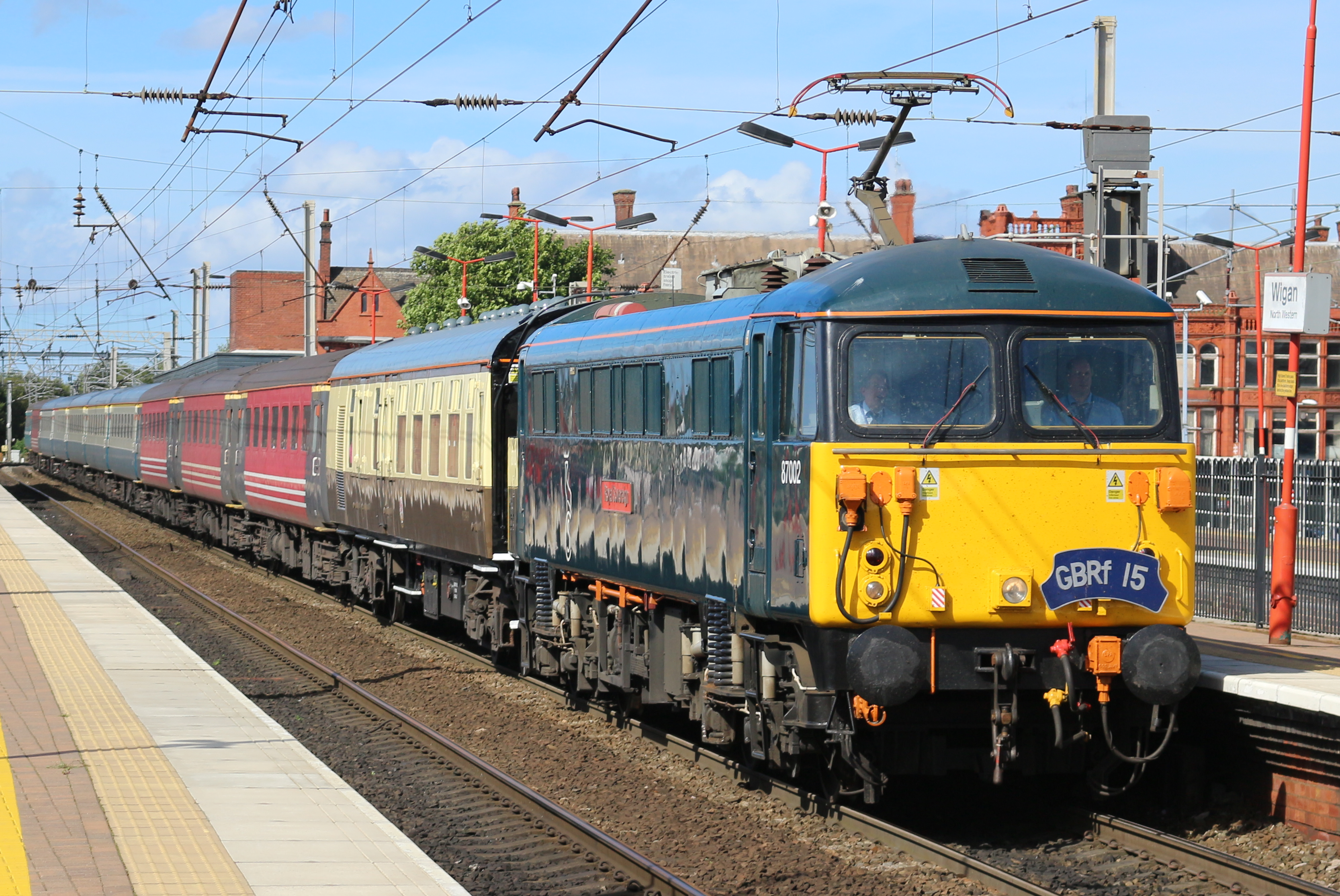
87002 working a GBRf charter through Wigan North Western

In November 2004, First GBRf acquired two locomotives which had recently been retired from Virgin passenger service. They were used as standby locomotives to rescue failed Class 325 units working GB Railfreight parcels trains. The fleet increased to four at one point, but finally consisted of two locomotives, 87022 Cock O' The North and 87028 Lord President, which were both withdrawn at the end of 2007. Their final working of a charter train was conducted on 29 December 2007.

On 31 March 2015, Serco took over the Caledonian Sleeper franchise from FirstGroup, and contracted GB Railfreight to provide haulage, who took over from DB Schenker. In February 2015 87002 was repainted into the new Caledonian Blue livery, and from 31 March 2015 was used to convey the empty sleeper coaching stock between London Euston and Wembley Intercity Depot, as well as between Glasgow Central and Polmadie TRSMD, along with 86101. After a lengthy refurbishment, 86401 joined the Caledonian Sleeper fleet on 8 August 2015. In October 2019, the 87 and 86s were withdrawn, primarily due to coupler incompatibility, and returned to the AC Locomotive Group.

=== Export to Bulgaria ===
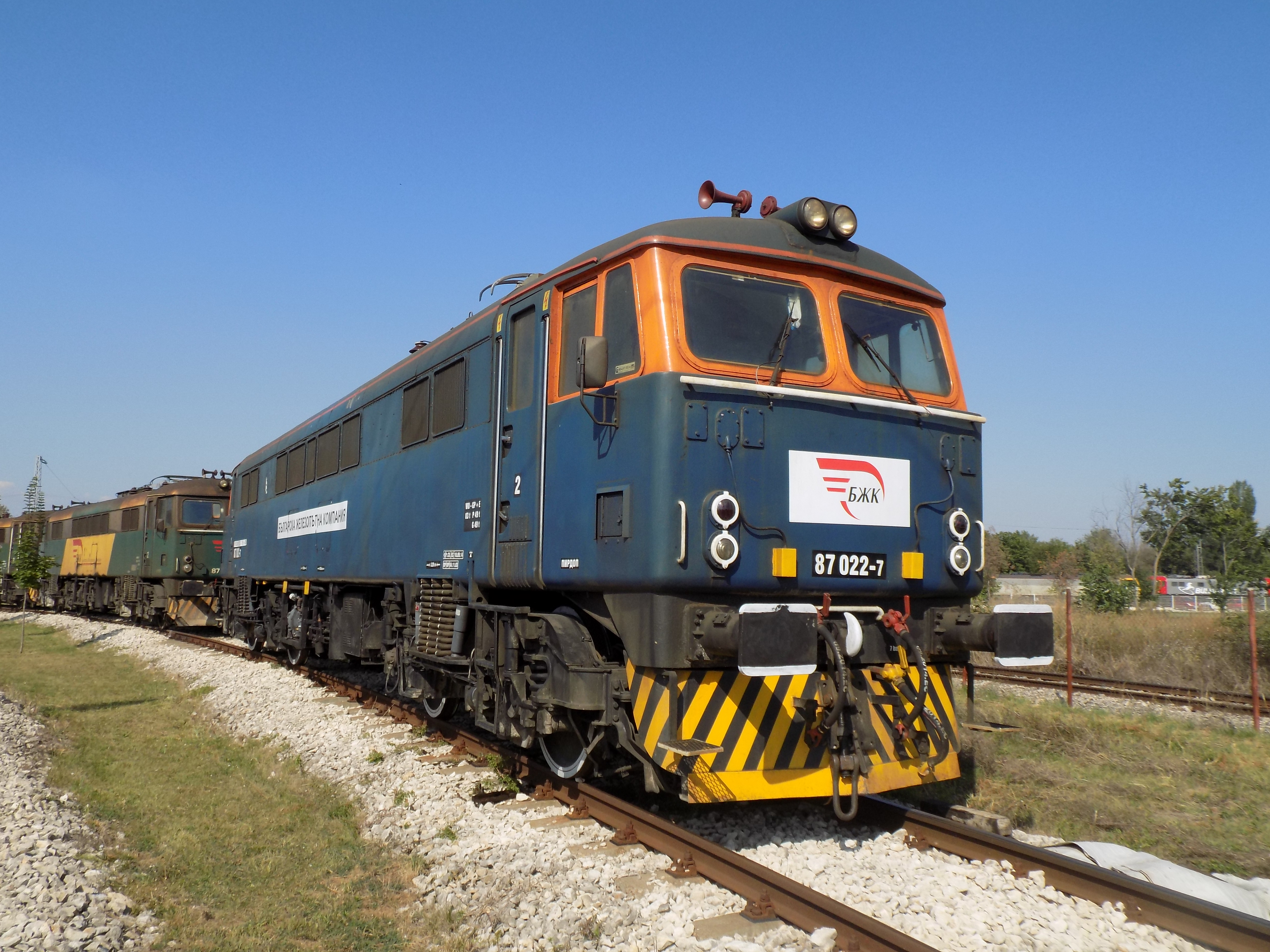
87022 working in Bulgaria

In 2006, Singapore trading company Romic-Ace International PTE Ltd approached Porterbrook to discuss the potential export of the Class 87 locomotives to a customer in eastern Europe. 87012 and 87019 were purchased and sold to the Bulgarian Railway Company, an open access operator in Bulgaria by Romic-Ace after preparation for export by Electric Traction Services Limited (ETS). The transfer did not take place until after Bulgaria's accession to the European Union the following year to minimise customs formalities.

Following successful trials and homologation by the state railways, a further 25 locomotives (the entire fleet, minus four (+ 87101) that had been scrapped, two already in Bulgaria and the four locomotives preserved or staying in the UK) were purchased from Porterbrook by Romic-Ace and sold to the Bulgarian Railway Company (БЖК/BRC) in seven batches with the refurbishment being carried out by ETS at Long Marston. The locomotives were then moved to Crewe for 25 kV testing and sign off. The project involved the supply of the locomotives, spares, drawings, overhaul documents and the provision of driver/staff training, which was provided by ETS in the UK and Bulgaria on behalf of Romic-Ace.

The locomotive batches were scheduled to be exported in stages over 2008 and 2009. The first batch, locos 87007, 87008 and 87026, were prepared by ETS and left the UK in June 2008 after testing and sign off by Romic-Ace and BRC at Crewe. The locomotives were delivered by rail via the Channel Tunnel. Subsequent batches of locomotives have been delivered by road to Hull, then ferry and barge to the port of Ruse in Bulgaria. Seventeen locomotives are in service with Bulgarian Railway Company. A downturn in traffic in Bulgaria meant that the export deal was terminated in 2009, leaving 11 locos "in limbo".

While those locomotives deemed to be in the worst condition (87011, 87018, 87021, 87027, 87030, 87031 and 87032) were sent for scrapping in 2010 and 2011, the four remaining Class 87s (87009, 87017, 87023 and 87025) were the property of operator Europhoenix. The firm made preparations for the possible use of both 87017 and 87023 in the UK, but the only interest that emerged from demonstrations was from Bulgaria in the form of the open access freight operator Bulmarket. 87017 and 87023 (in working order) and 87009 and 87025 (not in working order) were exported by ship from Immingham in October 2012.

Bulgarian Railway Company's fleet of Class 87s is based at Pirdop. The locomotives have been operated extensively throughout Bulgaria at locations such as Burgas, Ruse, Dimitrovgrad, Ilyantsi and Blagoevgrad. They have reportedly found heavy use on hauling sulphuric acid trains between Pirdop and Razdelna.

== Accidents ==
- On 16 February 1980, at Bushey, a broken welded rail caused a train hauled by 87007 to derail at 96 mph (154 km/h), injuring 19 passengers.
- 1999 Winsford rail accident: On 23 June 1999, an express hauled by 87027 collided with an empty Class 142 Pacer railbus which had passed a signal at danger in Cheshire. 31 people were injured.

== Fleet details ==
| Country | Owners/Operators | No. Built | Loco Numbers | Notes |
|---|---|---|---|---|
| GB | National Railway Museum | 1 | 87001 | |
| GB | Locomotive Services Limited | 1 | 87002 | |
| BG | BZK - Bulgarian Railway Company | 17 | 87003, 87004, 87006-87008, 87010, 87012-87014, 87019, 87020, 87022, 87026, 87028, 87029, 87033, 87034 | 87008 stored at Ruse, 87014 stored at Sofia. |
| BG | Bulmarket | 4 | 87009, 87017, 87023, 87025 | |
| GB | Crewe Heritage Centre | 1 | 87035 | |
| | Total | 24 | | |

== Preservation ==
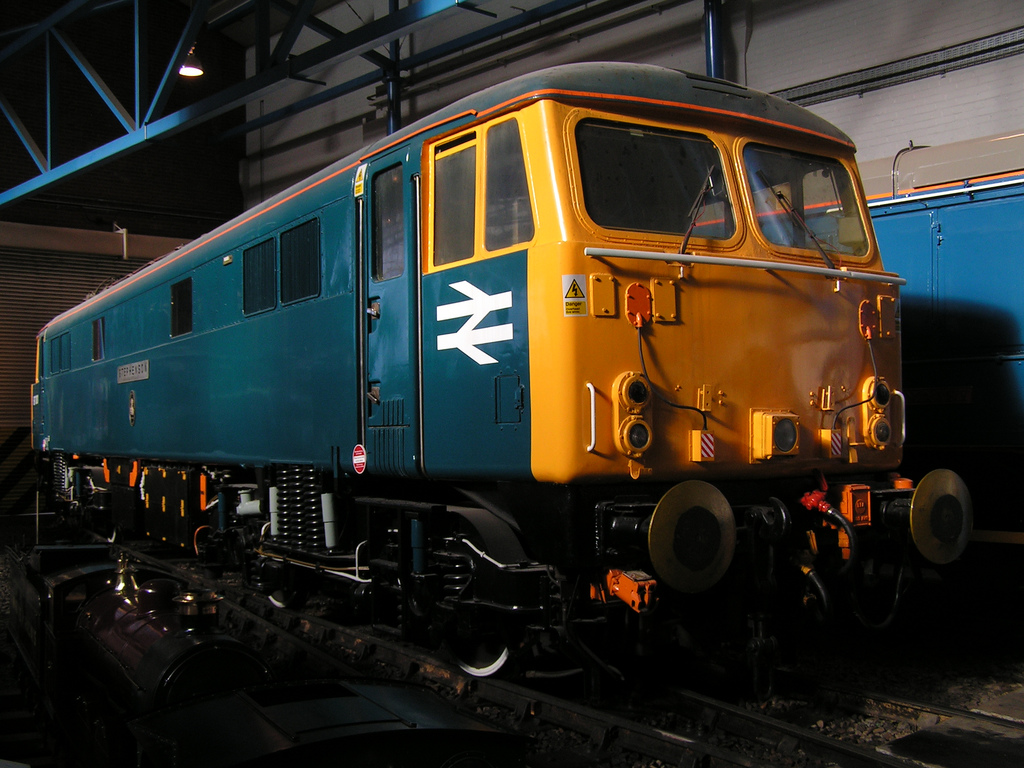
87001 on static display at the National Railway Museum

Three Class 87 electric locomotives are currently preserved in Britain:

- 87001 STEPHENSON/Royal Scot was donated to the National Railway Museum in November 2005.
- 87002 Royal Sovereign is owned by Locomotive Services Limited. It was preserved by the AC Locomotive Group and was returned to main line running condition. When the new contract for the Caledonian Sleeper was won by the Serco in 2014, 87002 was hired to work empty coaching stock movements in and out of London Euston. It was painted into Caledonian blue for the new contract in February 2015. From March 2015 until October 2019, 87002 shunted the empty sleeper coaching stock into London Euston, alongside 86101, as part of the Serco Caledonian Sleeper contract. Upon the end of the contract, 87002 was sold to Locomotive Services Limited for use on main line charter services.
- 87035 Robert Burns was the first locomotive to be preserved. It is based at Crewe Heritage Centre and was handed over for preservation by owners Porterbrook at Crewe Works Open Day on 10 September 2005. In 2022, it was repainted in the Virgin Trains livery, which it had worn prior to being preserved at the Heritage Centre.

| Numbers | Name | Livery | Location | Status |
|---|---|---|---|---|
| 87001 | STEPHENSON; Royal Scot | British Rail Blue | National Railway Museum | Static display |
| 87002 | Royal Sovereign | Inter-City Swallow | Crewe Diesel TMD | Operational |
| 87035 | Robert Burns | Virgin Trains | Crewe Heritage Centre | Static display |

In addition, the two banks of thyristors and the transformer from 87101 were preserved by the AC Locomotive Group. The transformer is now an exhibit at Crewe Heritage Centre, next to a cab from 86247.

== Model railways ==
Italian model railway manufacturer Lima launched the first OO gauge model of the Class 87. This was discontinued in 2004 with the bankruptcy of the company. In 2008, using the tooling acquired from its earlier purchase of Lima's assets, Hornby launched its first version of the BR Class 87 in OO gauge in BR Blue. In 2017, Hornby launched a super-detailed new tooled BR Class 87 in OO gauge in a variety of liveries, including InterCity Swallow, Virgin Trains and BR Blue.

A British N gauge model has been produced by Graham Farish in BR Blue, InterCity Swallow and Virgin Trains. A model of 87 001 Royal Scot, in InterCity livery, was introduced in autumn 1998. This was followed in winter 1998 by a model of 87 101 Stephenson, in BR Blue.

A Z gauge model was briefly produced by Märklin for Ellmar Products in the early 1980s, when the company flirted with British outline Z gauge models.
