= Bulgarian Railway Company =

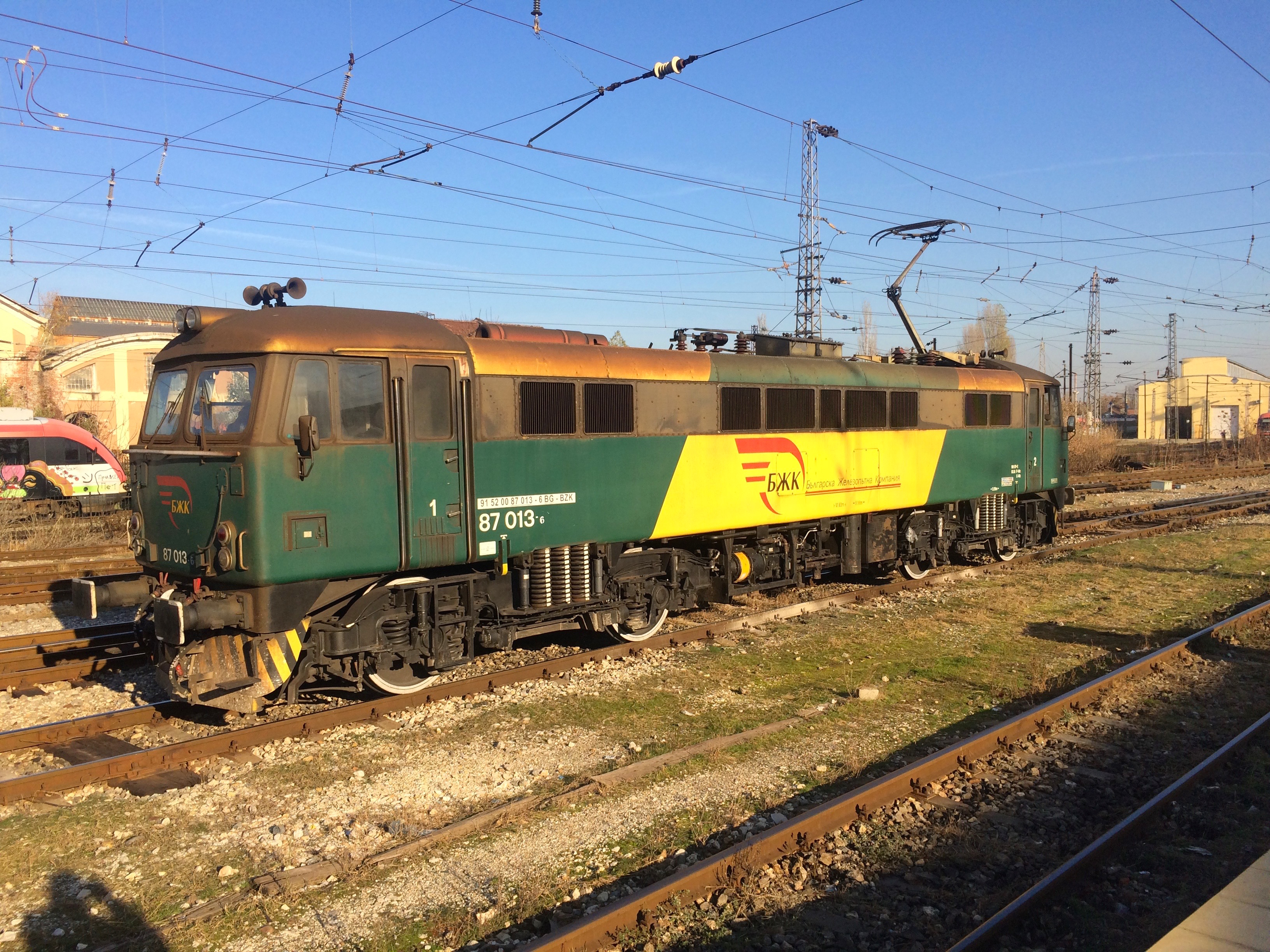
Class 87

The Bulgarian Railway Company (BRC, Bulgarian: Българска железопътна компания АД, romanized: Bulgarska zhelezoputna kompaniya AD) is the first privately held railfreight company to obtain a license in Bulgaria.

Control of BRC is shared by five Bulgarian companies and one Romanian company, Grup Feroviar Român Bucharest. BRC's chairman is Vladimir Dunchev, who was formerly the general director of the Bulgarian State Railway Company (BDZ).

On April 13, 2005, Bulgaria's transport ministry awarded the first private license to haul freight over the nation's rail network to the Bulgarian Railroad Company.

The BRC locomotive fleet includes class 87 locomotives exported from the UK.

== Locomotive Fleet ==
BRC operate a fleet of second hand locomotives:

=== Class 40 ===
Electric locomotives

- 40-0177-2
- 40-0817-3
- 40-1001-3
- 40-1013-8
- 40-1018-7
- 40-1019-5
- 40-1020-7
- 40-1022-9

=== Class 87 ===
Formerly British Rail Class 87 electric locomotives

- 87 003 - 0
- 87 004 - 8
- 87 006 - 3
- 87 007 - 1
- 87 008 - 9
- 87 010 - 5
- 87 012 - 1
- 87 013 - 9
- 87 014 - 7
- 87 019 - 6
- 87 020 - 4
- 87 022 - 0
- 87 026 - 1
- 87 028 - 7
- 87 029 - 5
- 87 033 - 7
- 87 034 - 5

=== Class 60 ===
Former Căile Ferate Române diesel locomotives

- 60 1522 - 6
- 60 1524 - 2

=== Class 52 ===
- 52 - 240

== See also ==
- BDZh Tovarni prevozi
