= KUR EA class =

Class of 6 East African 2-8-2 locomotives

Kenya-Uganda Railway EA class East African Railways 28 class
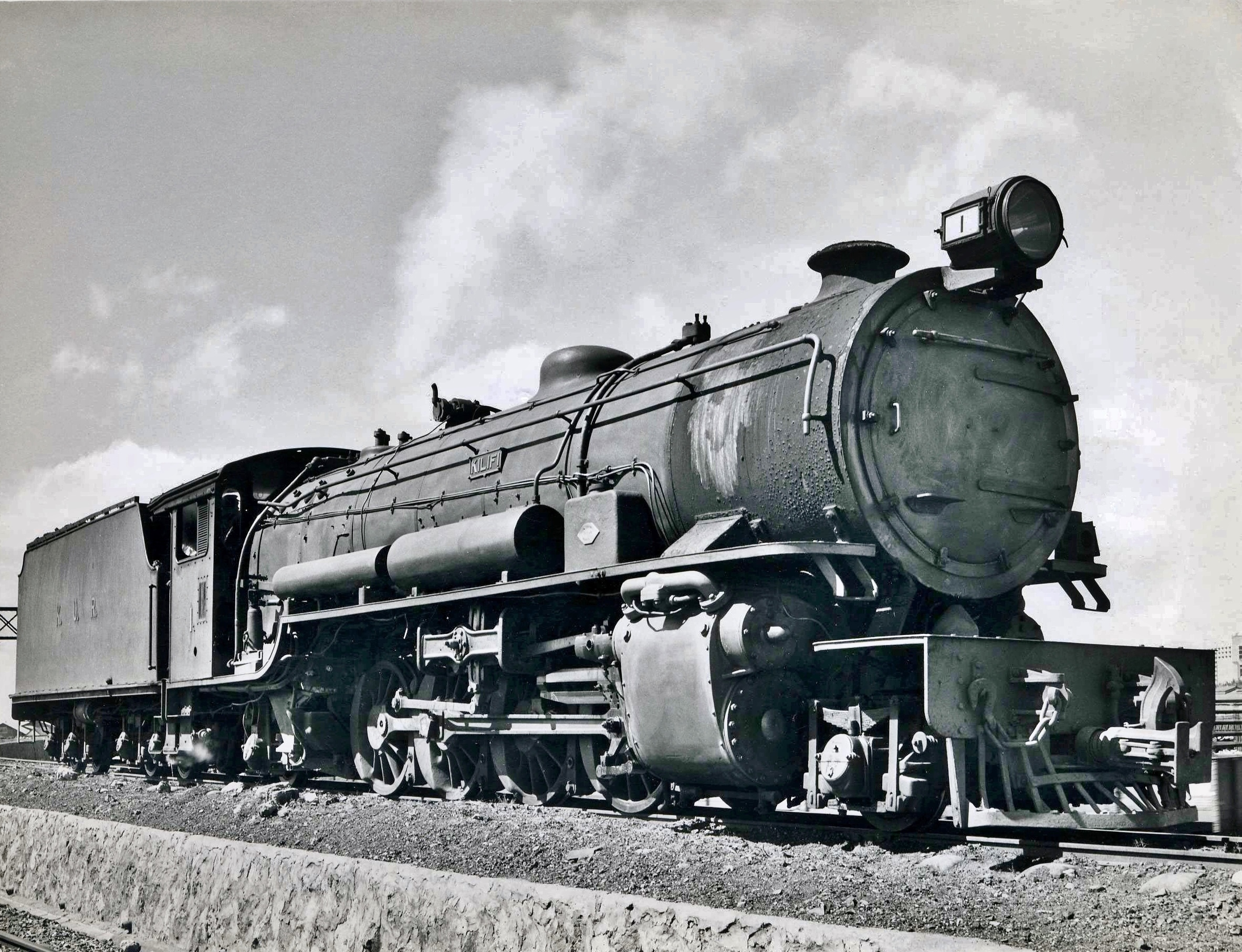
- Portrait of EAR 2804
Type and origin
- Power type: Steam
- Builder: Robert Stephenson and Company
- Serial number: 3921–3926
- Build date: 1928
- Total produced: 6
Specifications
- Configuration
  - Whyte: 2-8-2
  - UIC: 1′D1' h2
- Gauge: 1,000 mm (3 ft 3 3/8 in)
- Driver dia.: 51 in (1,295 mm)
- Adhesive weight: 69.5 long tons (70.6 t)
- Loco weight: 09.7 long tons (9.9 t)
- Fuel type: Oil → Coal → Oil
- Fuel capacity: Oil: 2,375 imp gal (10,800 L; 2,852 US gal); Coal: 12 long tons (12 t)
- Water cap.: 5,000 imp gal (23,000 L; 6,000 US gal)
- Firebox
  - Grate area: 40.5 sq ft (3.76 m^{2})
- Boiler pressure: 180 psi (1.24 MPa)
- Heating surface
  - Firebox: 180 sq ft (17 m^{2})
  - Tubes: 1,401 sq ft (130.2 m^{2}); (2,107 sq ft (195.7 m^{2}))
  - Total surface: 2,310 sq ft (215 m^{2})
- Superheater
  - Type: Inside
  - Heating area: 729 sq ft (67.7 m^{2}); (524 sq ft (48.7 m^{2}))
- Cylinders: 2
- Cylinder size: 21 1/4 in × 28 in (540 mm × 711 mm)
- Valve gear: Walschaerts
- Loco brake: Westinghouse type
- Train brakes: Westinghouse type
Performance figures
- Tractive effort: 37,938 lbf (168.76 kN)
Career
- Operators: Kenya-Uganda Railway (KUR); → East African Railways (EAR)
- Class: KUR: EA class; EAR: 28 class
- Number in class: 6
- Numbers: KUR: 1–6; EAR: 2801–2806
- First run: 1928
- Disposition: All scrapped

The KUR EA class, later known as the EAR 28 class, was a class of 1,000 mm (3 ft 3 3/8 in) gauge 2-8-2 steam locomotives. The six members of the class were built in 1928 for the Kenya-Uganda Railway (KUR) by Robert Stephenson and Company in Darlington, England, and were later operated by the KUR's successor, the East African Railways (EAR).

== Class list ==
The builder's and fleet numbers, and initial names (later removed), of each member of the class were as follows:

Builder's number	KUR number	EAR number	Name	Notes
3921	1	2801	Mvita	
3922	2	2802	Shimanzi	
3923	3	2803	Vanga	
3924	4	2804	Kilifi	
3925	5	2805	Lamu	
3926	6	2806	Malindi	

== See also ==
- Rail transport in Kenya
- Rail transport in Uganda
