= DSB Class EA =

Danish railways electric locomotive

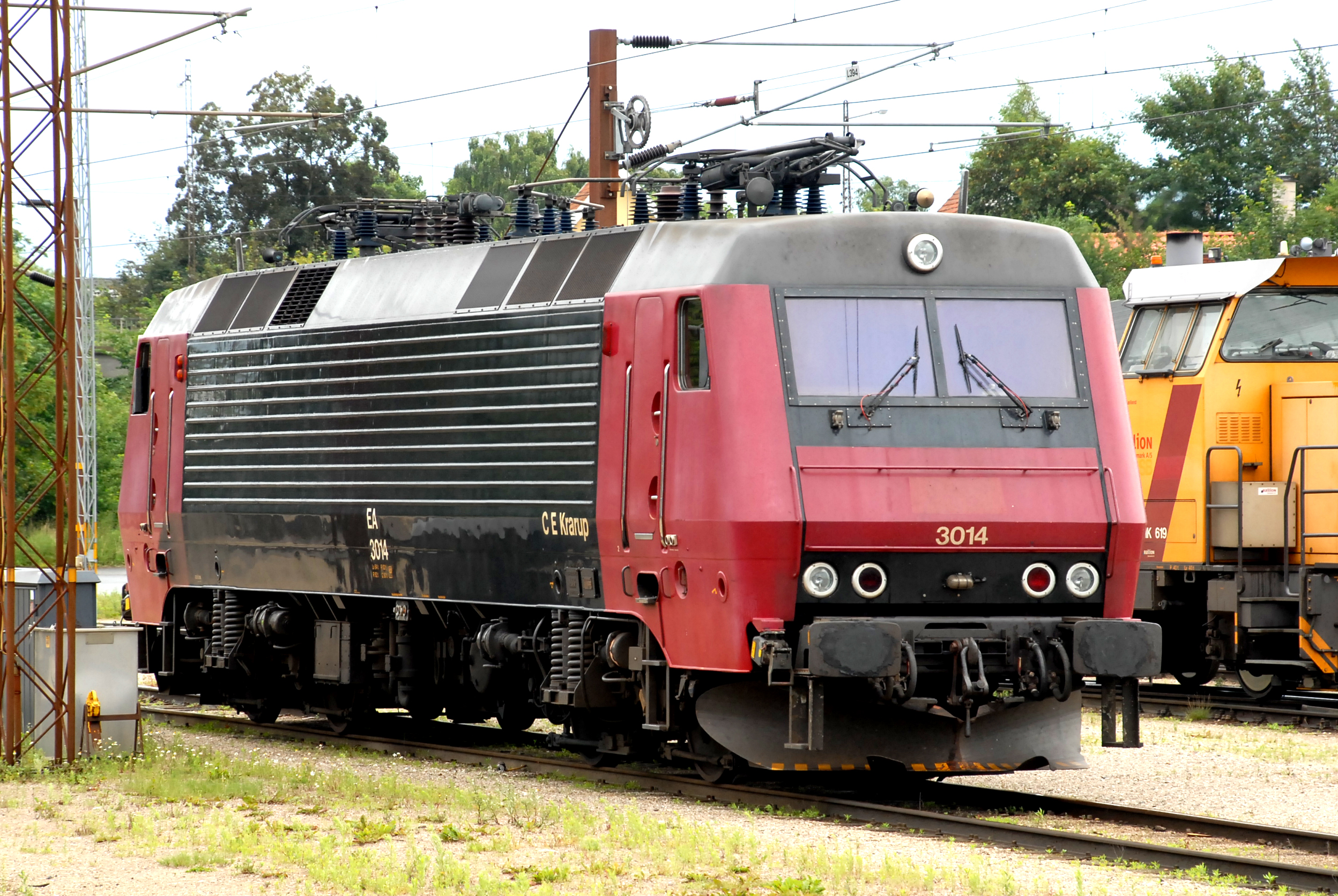
- DSB EA 3014
Type and origin
- Power type: Electric
- Build date: EA 3001 to 3010 : 1984-86; EA 3011 to 3022 : 1992-93
- Total produced: 22
Specifications
- Configuration
  - UIC: Bo′Bo′
- Gauge: 1,435 mm (4 ft 8 1/2 in)
- Wheel diameter: 1,250 mm (49.21 in)
- Wheelbase: bogie centres 9,940 mm (32 ft 7.34 in) axle wheelbase 2,800 mm (9 ft 2.24 in)
- Length: 19,380 mm (63 ft 7 in)
- Width: 3,180 mm (10 ft 5.2 in)
- Height: 4,590 mm (15 ft 0.7 in)
- Loco weight: 80 t (78.7 long tons; 88.2 short tons)
- Electric system/s: 25 kV 50 Hz AC Catenary
- Current pickup: Pantograph
Performance figures
- Maximum speed: 175 km/h (109 mph)
- Power output: 4,000 kW (5,400 hp) at rail
- Tractive effort: starting 260 kN (58,000 lbf)
Career
- Withdrawn: 11 December 2020 (DSB)

The DSB Class EA was the first electric locomotive in Denmark, introduced in 1984. Twenty-two were built for DSB, about half were acquired by Deutsche Bahn in 2001 when it took over the freight business of DSB.

Between 2007 and 2010 some units were transferred to DB Cargo Bulgaria for freight service in Bulgaria. As of 2017, only five units remained with DSB. The units were finally withdrawn from service in Denmark in December 2020.

== Background, design and construction ==
With electrification of the first Danish railway stretch in March 1986, DSB started to experience the need for an electric locomotive that could be used in passenger traffic as well as on freight trains. The design of EA locomotive was based on the German Class 120. The customisation included a re-designed body (adapted to DSB's new locomotive design first used on the Class ME), and adaption to the Danish overhead wire voltage (25 kV 50 Hz, as opposed to the 15 kV 16 2/3 Hz voltage used in Germany and other Scandinavian countries).

The locomotives were manufactured by a consortium of companies led by BBC, ABB Scandia, Siemens, Henschel, Thyssen-Henschel and EB Strømmen. The bodies of the first two locomotives were manufactured by Henschel in Germany, the remaining units by ABB Scandia.

The locomotives could work in push-pull mode and in multiple.

== Locomotive history ==
Initially the locomotives worked on passenger trains in Zealand, after the opening of the Great Belt Fixed Link in 1997 the locomotives were used on services on Funen and Jutland. After the introduction of the IR4 trains the locomotives were mostly used on passenger services.

In 2001 the freight arm of DSB (DSB Gods) was acquired by Railion and ten locomotives, numbers 3011 to 3019 and 3021 became the property of Railion Denmark.

In 2007, five locomotives were sold to private Bulgarian gas firm Bulmarket for use on its liquified gas trains.

In 2010 DB Schenker Bulgaria began running trains in Bulgaria, using ex DSB EA locomotives it had inherited from Railion; the locomotives received class number 86 whilst retaining the original locomotive number.

DSB EA 3004 and 3010 was withdrawn from service in May 2020 due to bad condition. DSB then had three EAs left 3007, 3020 and 3022. 3007 was only for reserve for 3020 and 3022 which were in better condition. The EA locos only drove on specific train departures Monday to Friday. They were not in service at weekends. DSB had ordered new locomotives, DSB EB (Siemens Vectron) to replace the EA and the first 3 arrived in mid-September 2020. After the EB had gone through test runs, they took over one the EA runs which meant the EA-locos only had one run Monday to Friday. The EA run had four departures two in the morning and two in the afternoon between Østerport – København H (Copenhagen C) – Ringsted. Friday 11 December 17:57 o´clock (5:57pm) the last EA passenger-towed train (Towed by EA 3020) departed from Ringsted station and arrived at Østerport at 18:58 o´clock (6:58pm). After the arrival the locomotive drove to the workshop for the day. Saturday 12 December EA 3020 and EA 3022 drove a test run with a wagon from the workshop to Korsør via Høje Taastrup and back to the workshop via the new highspeed track over Køge Nord (Køge North), It was the first, only and last time the EA had driven on the new highspeed track by itself. After the test run, they were withdrawn from service and put for sale with 3007 and 3010.

In February 2021 the last four EA-locos were sold to Bulmarket, Bulgaria to join the rest of the EA series except of EA 3004 which is stored in Denmark Railway Museum

=== List of locomotives ===
The 22 class EA locomotives are named after scientists, engineers and railway people as follows:

Number	Name	Entered service	History and notes
3001	H C Ørsted	1984	First electric locomotive in Denmark 20 March 1986. Repainted in DSB blue livery 2006. Scrapped in January 2017.
3002	Niels Bohr	1984	Sold to Bulmarket, Bulgaria 2007 as 86001
3003	Heinrich Wenck	1985	Sold to Bulmarket, Bulgaria 2007 as 86003
3004	Ole Rømer	1985	Received DSB blue livery 2006, ZWS communication system 2015, Received DSB Red livery 2017, Withdrawn from service May 2020 due to bad condition, sold to Danish Railway Museum in 2020.
3005	William Radford	1985	Sold to Bulmarket, Bulgaria 2007 86002
3006	Valdemar Poulsen	1985	Sold to Bulmarket, Bulgaria 2007
3007	Kirstine Meyer	1985	Received DSB blue livery 2006, ZWS communication system 2014, Received DSB Red livery 2017, Withdrawn from service 13 December 2020 and for sale. Sold to Bulmarket, Bulgaria 2021.
3008	Otto Busse	1986	Out of service 2004 (used for spares), sold to Bulmarket, Bulgaria 2007
3009	Anker Engelund	1986	Sold to Bulmarket, Bulgaria 2007
3010	Søren Hjorth	1986	Received DSB blue livery 2006, ZWS communication system 2015, Received DSB Red livery 2017, Withdrawn from service May 2020 due to bad condition and for sale from 13 December. Sold to Bulmarket, Bulgaria 2021.
3011	Thomas B Thrige	1992	Becomes Railion Denmark EA 3011 in 2001, transferred to DB Schenker Romania as 465001 in 2009
3012	A R Angelo	1992	Becomes Railion Denmark EA 3012 in 2001, transferred to DB Schenker Romania as 465002 in 2009
3013	Wilhelm Hellesen	1992	Becomes Railion Denmark EA 3013 in 2001, transferred to DB Schenker Bulgaria 2010
3014	C E Krarup	1992	Becomes Railion Denmark EA 3014 in 2001, transferred to DB Schenker Bulgaria 2010
3015	Nielsine Nielsen	1992	Becomes Railion Denmark EA 3014 in 2001, transferred to DB Schenker Bulgaria.
3016	A W Hauch	1992	Becomes Railion Denmark EA 3016 in 2001, transferred to DB Schenker Bulgaria 2009
3017	Emil Chr Hansen	1992	Becomes Railion Denmark EA 3017 in 2001, transferred to DB Schenker Bulgaria 2010
3018	Niels Finsen	1992	Becomes Railion Denmark EA 3018 in 2001, transferred to DB Schenker Romania as 465004 in 2009
3019	P O Pedersen	1992	Becomes Railion Denmark EA 3019 in 2001, transferred to DB Schenker Bulgaria 2010
3020	G F Ursin	1992	In storage 2004–5, received blue DSB livery 2006 and returned to service, ZWS communication system 2015, Received DSB Red livery 2017, Drove the last EA passenger-towed train Friday the 11th. December 2020, Withdrawn from service 13 December 2020 and for sale. Sold to Bulmarket, Bulgaria 2021.
3021	P W Lund	1992	Becomes Railion Denmark EA 3021 in 2001, shipped to Romania 2009
3022	Søren Frich	1992	Received DSB blue livery 2006, ZWS communication system 2015, Received DSB Red livery 2017, Withdrawn from service 13 December 2020 and for sale. Sold to Bulmarket, Bulgaria 2021.

== Gallery ==
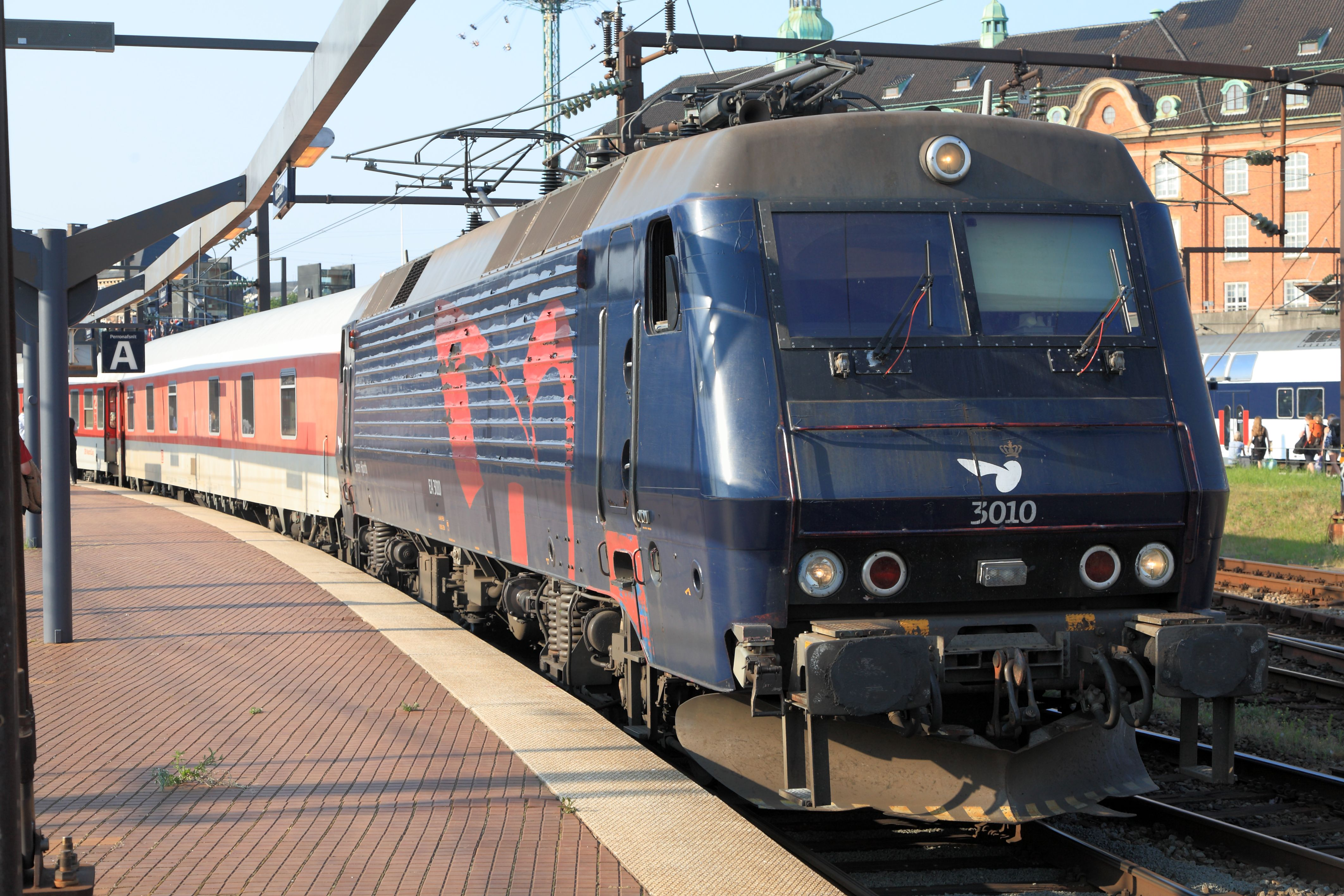
EA 3010

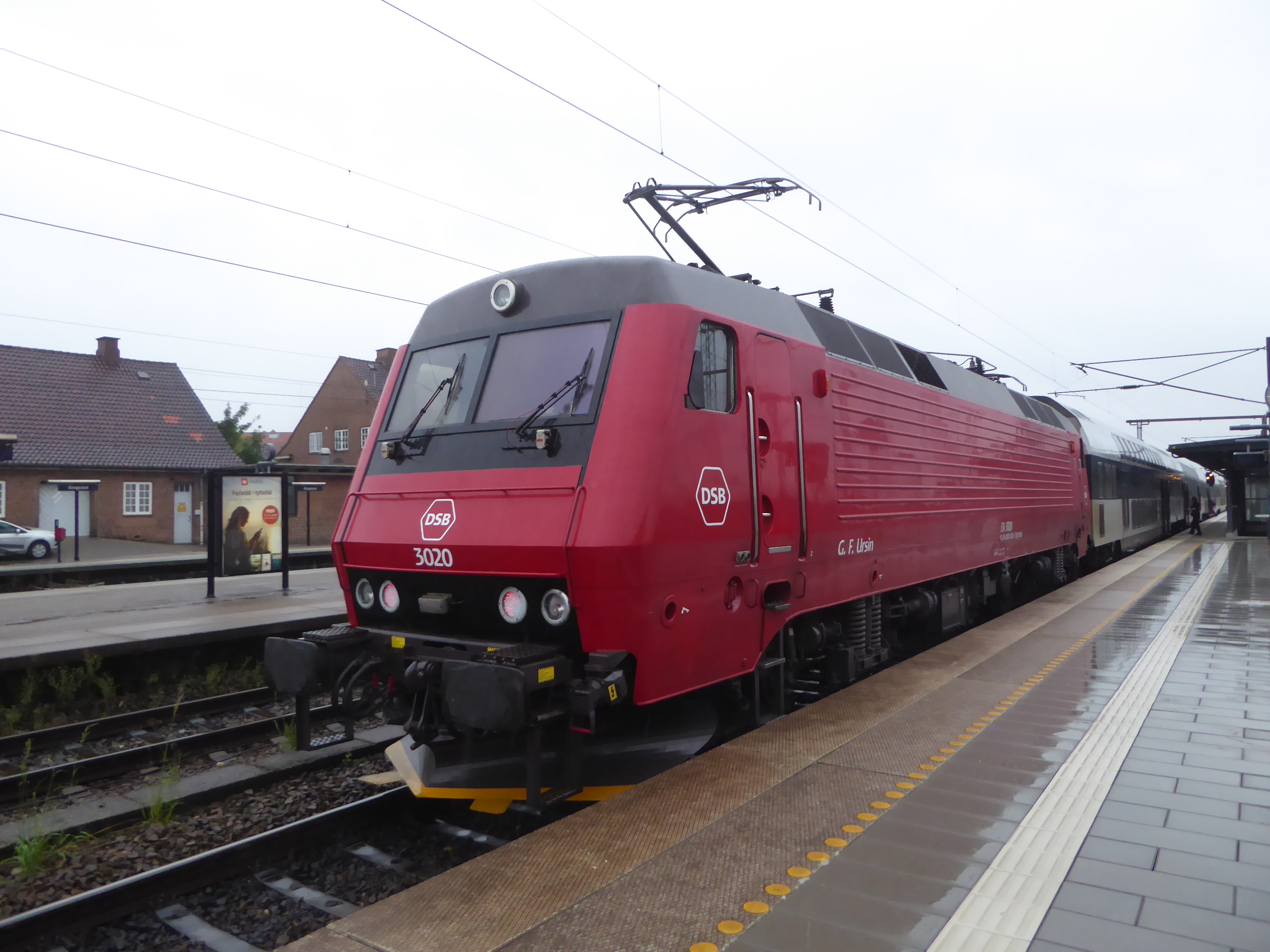
EA 3020

== See also ==
- List of DSB locomotives and multiple units
- DSB Class ME, similar externally designed contemporary diesel electric locomotive
