= Bulmarket =

Bulmarket DM
- Native name: БУЛМАРКЕТ ДМ ЕООД
- Industry: Petroleum products distribution
- Founded: 1996-05-09
- Founder: Stanko Stankov
- Headquarters: Ruse, Bulgaria
- Area served: Balkans
- Revenue: BGN 2 billion (2019)
- Number of employees: >1,000
- Website: bulmarket.bg/en

Bulmarket DM OOD (Bulgarian: „Булмаркет ДМ“ ЕООД) is a private company, registered in 1996, based in the Bulgarian city of Ruse.

== Operations ==
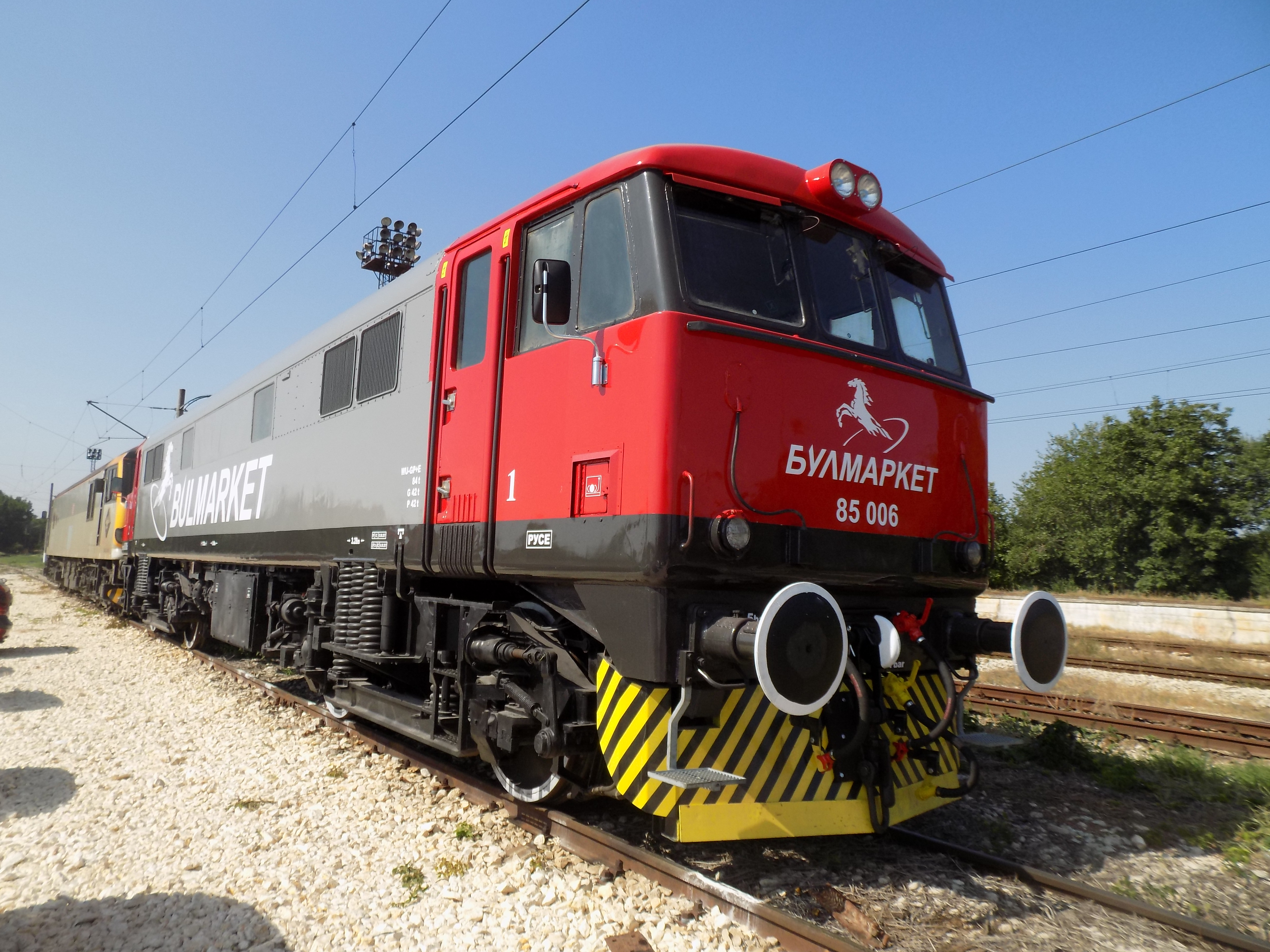
85 006, formerly British Rail Class 86 86234, in service with Bulmarket

=== Petroleum derivatives ===
The company is one of the largest importers and exporters of LPG in Bulgaria. It has four terminals for gas and oil products in Bulgaria (Byala and Plovdiv) and Romania (Galați and Giurgiu), railway and tank trucks for gas and a ship-gas carrier for propane-butane. Imports are sourced from Russia, Kazakhstan and Romania for onward supply to customers in Bulgaria and the adjoining countries. The Galați terminal is located in an economic free zone to reduce the impact of customs. Bulmarket are also suppliers of diesel and petrol.

=== Port facilities ===
It owns a port on the Danube, Port Bulmarket JSC, equipped for handling liquid and bulk cargo. This includes a terminal for transshipment of gas from ship to rail and road, and storage for natural gas and propane-butane.

=== Compressed natural gas ===
The company has built a network of its own methane stations, supplying CNG to industrial consumers.

=== Alternative fuels ===
The company has had a biodiesel plant since 2008 and a crude vegetable oil plant since 2012.

=== Railway operations ===
Bulmarket was the first private railway carrier in Bulgaria. It was granted a license for railway transport on 21 October 2005, allowing it to operate freight trains across the Bulgarian railway network. It owns an extensive fleet of locomotives, acquired second hand from other European operators.

==== Locomotive fleet ====
List of locomotives
Original Operator	Class	Numbers		Builder	Build date	Notes
Original Operator	Class	Original	Bulmarket/EVN	Builder	Build date	Notes
DSB	EA	ЕА 3002	91 52 20 86 001 – 8	Henschel & Son, Kassel	1984	
DSB	EA	ЕА 3003	91 52 20 86 002 – 6	Scandia werk, Randers	1985	
DSB	EA	ЕА 3005	91 52 20 86 003 – 4	Scandia werk, Randers	1985	
DSB	EA	ЕА 3006	91 52 20 86 004 – 2	Scandia werk, Randers	1985	
DSB	EA	ЕА 3007		Scandia werk, Randers	1986	
DSB	EA	ЕА 3008	91 52 20 86 005 – 9	Scandia werk, Randers	1986	
DSB	EA	ЕА 3009	-	Scandia werk, Randers	1986	
DSB	EA	ЕА 3010	-	Scandia werk, Randers	1986	
DSB	EA	ЕА 3020	-	Scandia werk, Randers	1992	
DSB	EA	ЕА 3022	-	Scandia werk, Randers	1992	
British Rail	87	87009	91 52 00 87 009 – 4	BREL, Crewe Works	November 1973	Operable
British Rail	87	87017	91 52 00 87 017 – 7	BREL, Crewe Works	April 1974	Operable
British Rail	87	87023	91 52 00 87 023 – 5	BREL, Crewe Works	April 1974	Operable
British Rail	87	87025	91 52 00 87 025 – 0	BREL, Crewe Works	April 1974	Operable
British Rail	86	86701	91 52 00 85 001 – 3	British Rail Doncaster Works	October 1965	
British Rail	86	86702	91 52 00 85 002 – 1	English Electric at Vulcan Foundry	March 1966	
British Rail	86	86213	91 52 00 85 003 – 9	English Electric at Vulcan Foundry	December 1965	
British Rail	86	86235	91 52 00 85 004 – 7	English Electric at Vulcan Foundry	October 1965	
British Rail	86	86231	91 52 00 85 005 – 4	British Rail Doncaster Works	October 1965	
British Rail	86	86234	91 52 00 85 006 – 2	English Electric at Vulcan Foundry	May 1966	
BDŽ	51; DVM-2	51 109	51 109	Ganz-Mavag, Budapest	1973	Stored. Works number 1752
BDŽ	51; DVM-2	51 165.9	51 165.9	Ganz-Mavag, Budapest		
BDŽ	51; DVM-2	51 166	51 166	Ganz-Mavag, Budapest		Not operable
BDŽ	52; V60 LEW	52 255.7	52 255.7	Hans Beimler, Hennigsdorf	1980	Works number 16980
BDŽ	52; V60 LEW	52 293.8	52 293.8	Hans Beimler, Hennigsdorf	1983	Works number 18100
BDŽ	55; LDH125	55 125	55 125	FAUR, Bucharest	1975	
BDŽ	55; LDH125	55 182.0	55 182.0	FAUR, Bucharest	1977	
BDŽ	55; LDH125	55 229.9	55 229.9	FAUR, Bucharest	1986	Works number 25127
BDŽ	55; LDH125	55 238.0	55 238.0	FAUR, Bucharest		
BDŽ	55; LDH125	55 241	55 241	FAUR, Bucharest		
BDŽ	55; LDH125	55 263.8	55 263.8	FAUR, Bucharest	1991	Works number 25718
CFR	LDH70		LDH70-681	FAUR, Bucharest		
CFR	Unknown		MDD4-02	Express Service - Ruse	2014	
