= Hitrino Municipality =

Hitrino Municipality Община Хитрино
- Municipality
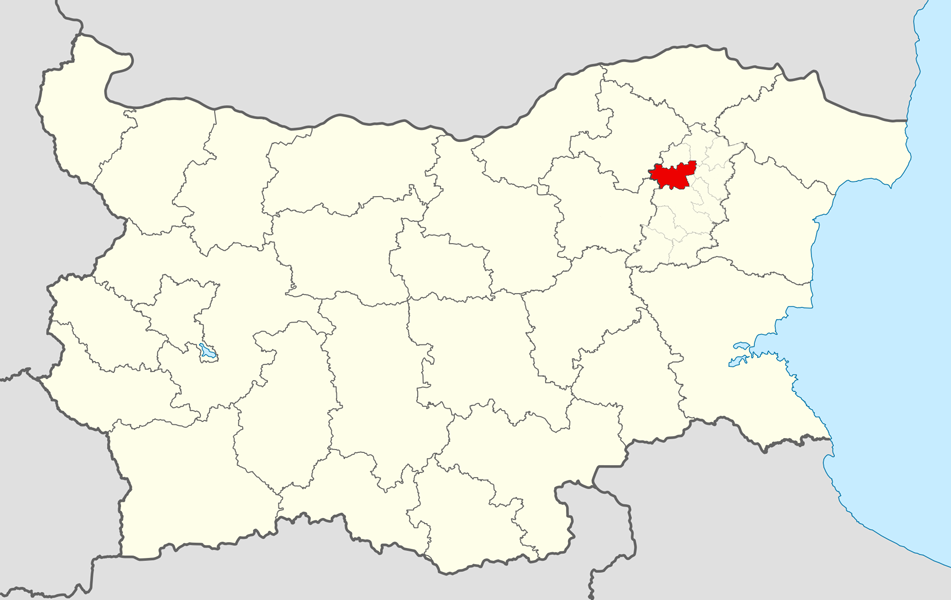
- Hitrino Municipality within Bulgaria and Shumen Province.
- Coordinates: 43°26′N 26°53′E
- Country: Bulgaria
- Province (Oblast): Shumen
- Admin. centre (Obshtinski tsentar): Hitrino

Area
  - Total: 289.37 km^{2} (111.73 sq mi)

Population (December 2009)
  - Total: 6,423
  - Density: 22.20/km^{2} (57.49/sq mi)
- Time zone: UTC+2 (EET)
  - Summer (DST): UTC+3 (EEST)

Hitrino Municipality (Bulgarian: Община Хитрино) is a municipality (obshtina) in Shumen Province, Northeastern Bulgaria, located in the Ludogorie geographical region, part of the Danubian Plain. It is named after its administrative centre - the village of Hitrino.

The municipality embraces a territory of 288 km^{2} (111 sq mi) with a population of 6,423 inhabitants, as of December 2009.

== Settlements ==
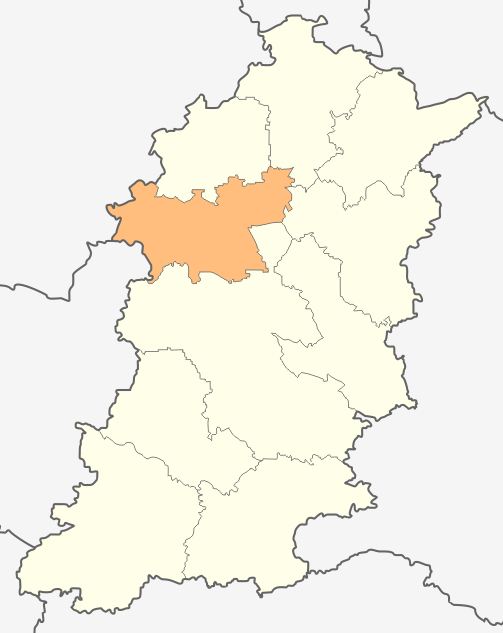
Hitrino Municipality within Shumen Province

Hitrino Municipality includes the following 23 places, all of them are villages:

Town/Village	Cyrillic	Population (December 2009)
Hitrino	Хитрино	715
Baykovo	Байково	148
Bliznatsi	Близнаци	221
Cherna	Черна	318
Dlazhko	Длъжко	161
Dobri Voynikovo	Добри Войниково	160
Edinakovtsi	Единаковци	124
Iglika	Иглика	205
Kalino	Калино	180
Kamenyak	Каменяк	537
Razvigorovo	Развигорово	251
Slivak	Сливак	185
Stanovets	Становец	46
Studenitsa	Студеница	454
Tervel	Тервел	285
Timarevo	Тимарево	791
Trem	Трем	280
Visoka Polyana	Висока поляна	211
Varbak	Върбак	344
Zhivkovo	Живково	567
Zvegor	Звегор	240
Total		6,423

== Demography ==
The following table shows the change of the population during the last four decades.

Hitrino Municipality
Year	1975	1985	1992	2001	2005	2007	2009	2011
Population	15,726	13,062	8,624	7,045	6,937	6,664	6,423	6,223
Sources: Census 2001, Census 2011, „pop-stat.mashke.org“,

=== Ethnic composition ===
According to the 2011 census, among those who answered the optional question on ethnic identification, the ethnic composition of the municipality was the following:

Ethnic group	Population	Percentage
Bulgarians	867	15%
Turks	4853	84%
Roma (Gypsy)	26	0.4%
Other	10	0.2%
Undeclared	24	0.4%

Ethnic groups in the municipality of Dulovo (2011 census)
Ethnic group	Percentage
Bulgarians	15.0%
Turks	84.0%
Roma	0.4%
others and indefinable	0.6%

=== Religious composition ===
Religions in Hitrino Municipality (2011 census)
Religious group	Percentage
Orthodox Christian	12.7%
Muslim	83.5%
Protestant Christian	0.2%
Roman Catholic Christian	0.5%
others and indefinable	3.1%

== See also ==
- Provinces of Bulgaria
- Municipalities of Bulgaria
- List of cities and towns in Bulgaria
