= Nederlandse Spoorwegen =

Principal Dutch passenger railway operator

- Railway tracks in the Netherlands

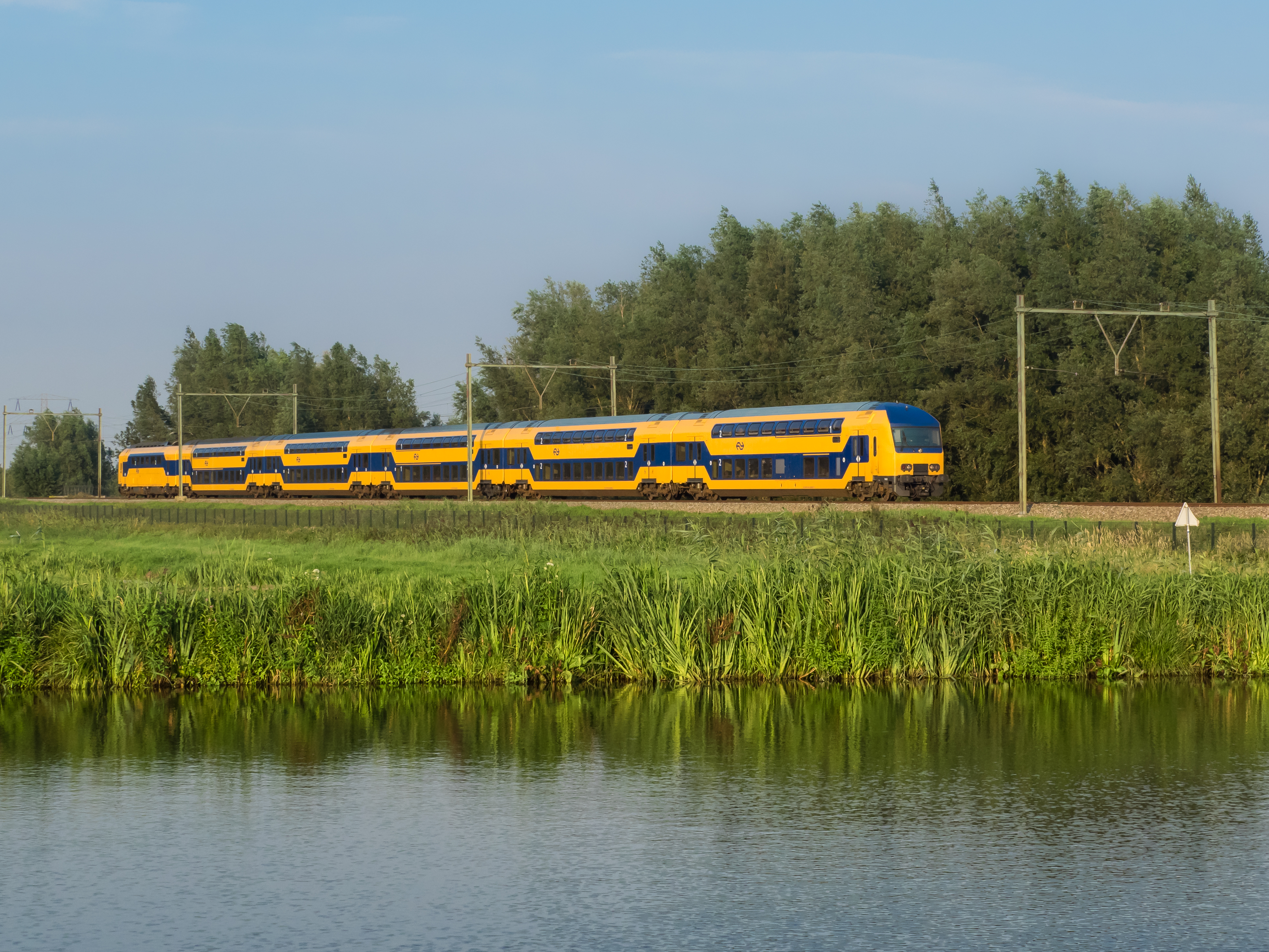
- Double decker (DDZ) train near Gouda, South Holland

Overview
- Locale: Netherlands
- Dates of operation: 1938–present
- Predecessor: Hollandsche IJzeren Spoorweg-Maatschappij (HSM); Maatschappij tot Exploitatie van Staatsspoorwegen (SS)

Technical
- Track gauge: 1,435 mm (4 ft 8 1/2 in) standard gauge

Other
- Website: www.ns.nl

Nederlandse Spoorwegen ([ˈneːdərlɑntsə ˈspoːrˌʋeːɣə(n)], lit. 'Dutch Railways', NS [ɛnˈɛs]) is the principal passenger railway operator in the Netherlands. It is a Dutch state-owned company founded in 1938.

The rail infrastructure is maintained by network manager ProRail, which was split off from NS in 2003. Freight operator NS Cargo merged with DB Cargo in 2000. NS runs 4,800 scheduled domestic trains a day, serving 1.1 million passengers. The NS also provides international rail services from the Netherlands to other European destinations and carries out concessions on some foreign rail markets through its subsidiary Abellio.

== History ==
=== Early years ===
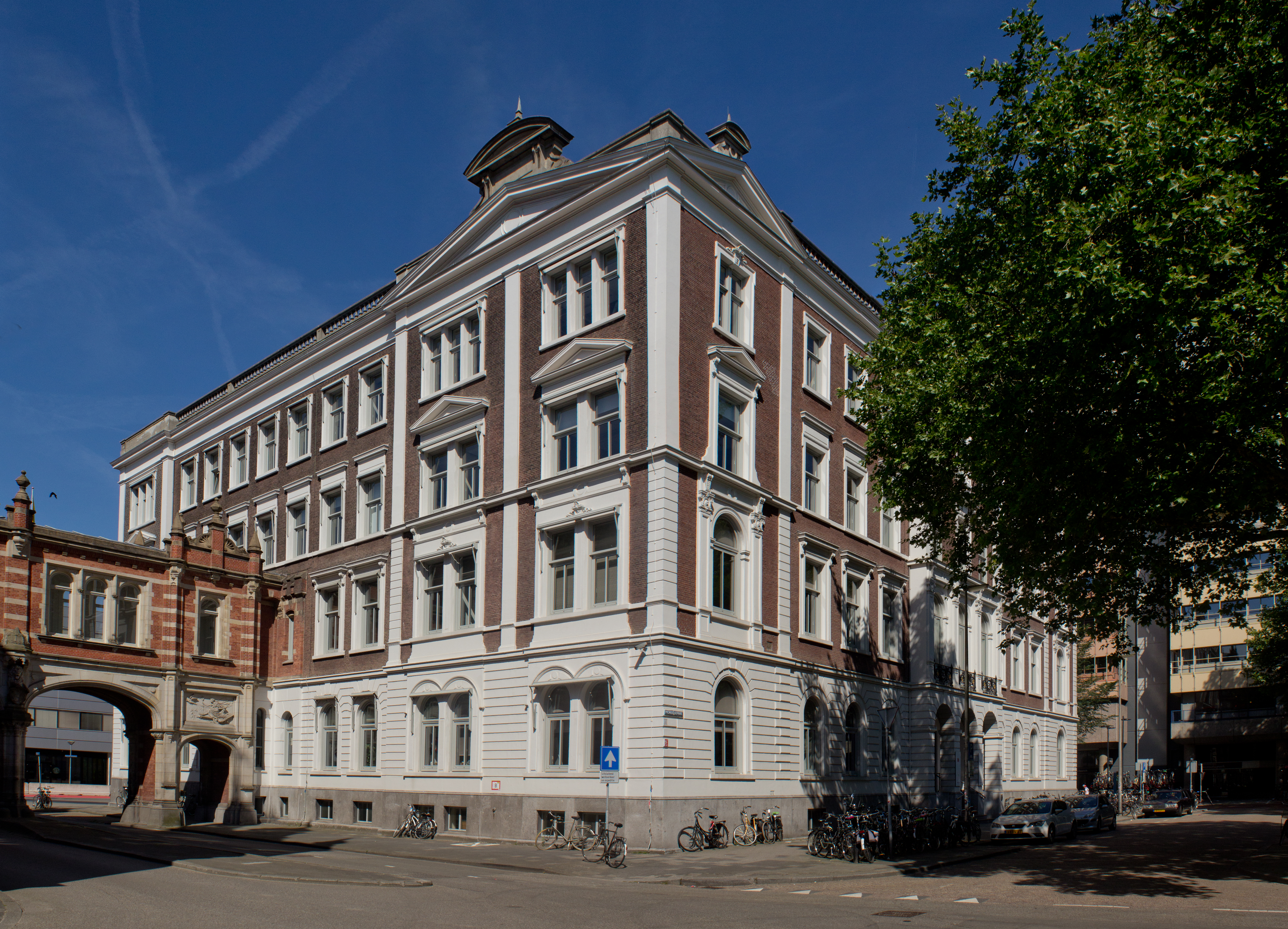
The Hoofdgebouw I (Main Building I) complex in Utrecht, former Nederlandse Spoorwegen headquarters and nowadays the office of DB Cargo in the Netherlands

During World War I (WW I), the Netherlands were neutral. They had a strategic position between the German Empire, German-occupied Belgium, and the UK. They did some trade with the German Empire and the UK, but much less than before WW I. The Royal Navy blocked the English Channel and the North Sea (Northern Patrol). WW I caused an economic downturn in the Netherlands. The two largest Dutch railway companies, Hollandsche IJzeren Spoorweg-Maatschappij (HSM) and Maatschappij tot Exploitatie van Staatsspoorwegen (SS), became unprofitable. The companies avoided bankruptcy by integrating their operations, which was complete by 1917. The cooperation was for both economic and ideological reasons, and the state provided support by buying shares in both companies. In 1938, the state bought the remaining shares and merged the companies to create NS; NS was not nationalised.

In May 1940, eight months after the beginning of World War II, Nazi Germany led the Westfeldzug. The Netherlands, Belgium and Luxemburg capitulated in May 1940 and France on 22 June 1940. Germany occupied them and created the Reichskommissariat of Belgium and Northern France. NS was forced by the German occupiers to construct railways to Westerbork transit camp and transport almost a hundred thousand Jews to extermination camps where they were murdered. The company's only wartime strike was during the Dutch famine of 1944–45; NS opted not to strike in 1943.

NS played a pivotal role in the post-war reconstruction of the Netherlands; it provided the required logistical services in a time when there was little alternative to rail transport. The company declined in the 1960s – like many other railways – and operated at a loss. There was increased competition from other modes of transport. In addition, national coal distribution from Limburg became less profitable; the discovery of a gas field near Slochteren led to coal losing market share to natural gas in power plants and homes. NS' response, the Spoorslag '70 plan which increased service and introduced intercity service, failed to restore profitability. The company was deemed nationally important and received state subsidies.

=== Reforms and reversal ===
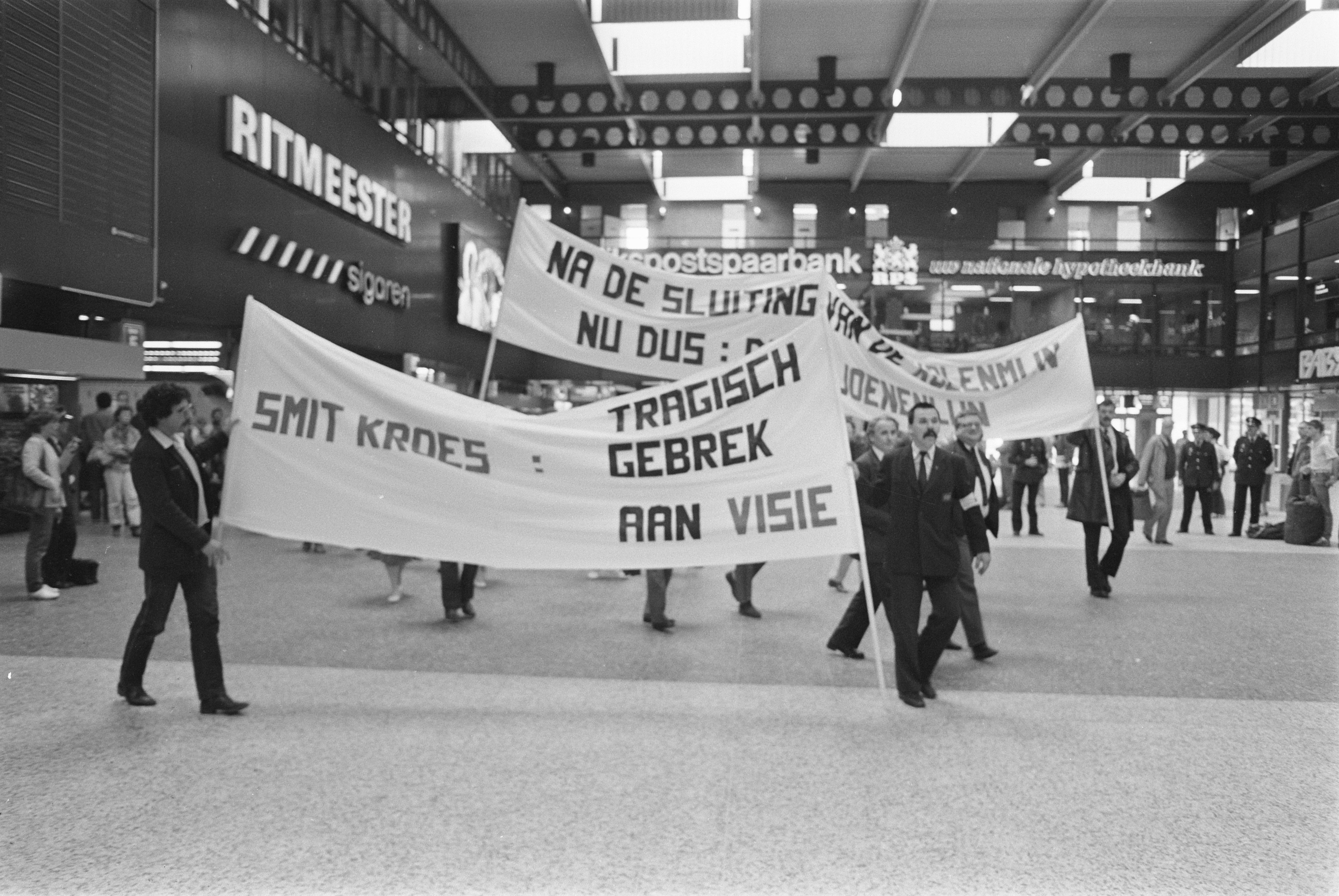
Protests against neoliberal policies in 1983

NS was reorganized following the neoliberal reforms of the 1980s and the 1991 EU Directive 91/440; the latter required railway infrastructure and transport activities to be managed independently. Although the state called the process "corporatization" (verzelfstandiging), it really only meant the withdrawal of subsidies. The changes were carried out by Rob den Besten, who became chief executive officer of NS after the retirement of Leo Ploeger.

NS' infrastructure division was split off into NS Railinfratrust. Plans to split the remainder of NS met with limited success due to trade union opposition; the new companies created were NS Reizigers and locomotive maintenance company NedTrain. Passenger transport was to be conducted on a commercial basis, but the state continued to subsidize non-viable routes. Internally, route managers assumed de facto control, but they were dependent on a different organ in the company The freight business, NS Cargo, merged with Deutsche Bahn; the resulting company operated as Railion in 2000 and then as DB Cargo. Performance deteriorated after the reforms, and the company suffered multiple unorganized strikes. The entire board of directors resigned in late-2001.

Another change in strategy followed. Karel Noordzij became CEO in 2002 and reversed many of the reforms to restore confidence in the company. The state no longer considered competitive passenger service to be viable, and began granting concessions with the goal of one concession per line. NS received a concession to run main line routes until 2025.

=== Recent years ===
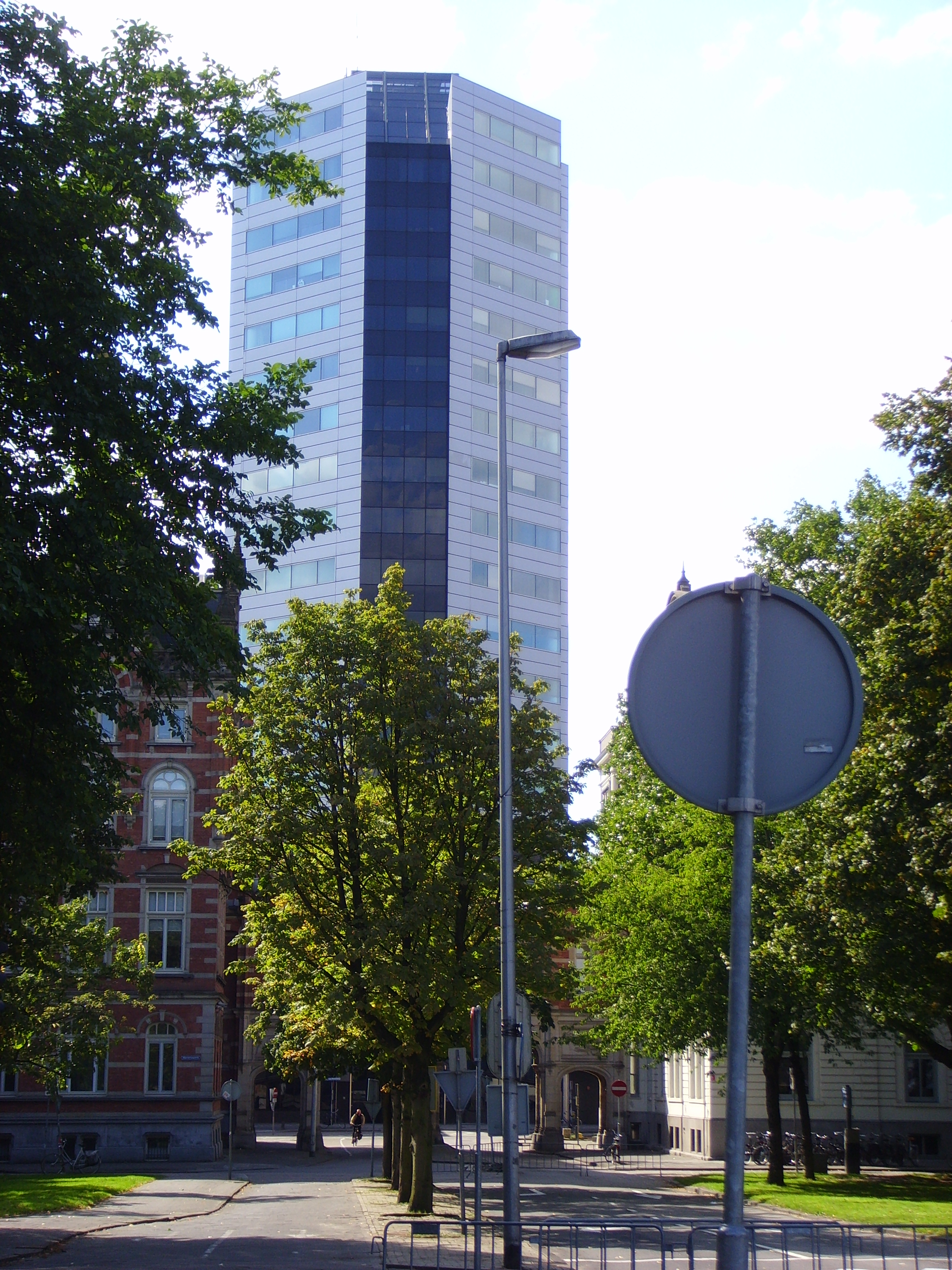
Current headquarters in Utrecht

The timetable change on 10 December 2006 saw the most routes to approximate the symmetry minute in clock-face schedules to the one used in most other European countries. The previous symmetry minute 46 led to problems with cross-border trains. As of December 2022 the company's CEO is former minister Wouter Koolmees, after Marjan Rintel left to become CEO of KLM.

NS was heavily impacted by the COVID-19 pandemic, which caused massive drops in passenger numbers. The company received significant financial support from the national government in order to keep the company solvent. In 2022, the company made significant cuts in its timetable, running fewer and shorter trains, as a consequence of personnel shortages.

4 October 2025 was the last day NS used locomotives in domestic passenger services. The last ones, which were running between The Hague and Eindhoven, were retired.

== Controversies ==
NS has been involved in various controversies.

- Technical problems with the high-speed V250 trains, which started their services on 29 July 2013, and ended on 17 January 2014, led to the resignation of CEO Bert Meerstadt in June 2016 and a parliamentary investigation in 2016. The High Speed Alliance (HSA), an NS (80%) / KLM (20%) joint venture almost went bankrupt due to the late introduction of the trains in combination with a too high price for the concession which the company paid to the Dutch government. HSA was liquidated in 2017.
- In 2013, it was revealed that NS had been using a subsidiary in Ireland, NS Financial Services Company (NSFSC), to reduce its tax liability in the Netherlands. The procedure was determined to be lawful, but it was unfavorable for the Dutch taxpayers for a state-owned company to avoid national taxes. From 1998 the NS used the favourable tax climate in Ireland, which resulted in a profit for NS of more than €270 million but a loss to the Dutch state of €21 million in 2012 alone. The corporate tax rate in Ireland was 12.5%, in the Netherlands 25% at that time. NS used its Irish subsidiary to buy new trains, among others the high-speed V250 trains from the Italian firm AnsaldoBreda. The Dutch Minister of Finance, Jeroen Dijsselbloem, wrote to the parliament that NS would stop this tax evasion. Most rolling stock was transferred to the Netherlands-based NS Lease in December 2017. NSFSC was wound up in April 2019.
- In 2015 it became clear that a subsidiary of NS, Abellio, had shown unfair behaviour about a tendering for public transport in the province of Limburg. The company had obtained confidential information from a competitor, Veolia, through a former employee of Veolia who had been hired by Abellio subsidiary Qbuzz. On 5 June 2015, it became clear that CEO Timo Huges of the NS had given incomplete and incorrect information about the tendering procedure. According to Minister Dijsselbloem, Huges had acted "sloppy, inaccurate and in violation of the law." Consequently, Huges resigned from his position.

== Coverage ==
Top three busiest railway stations in the Netherlands

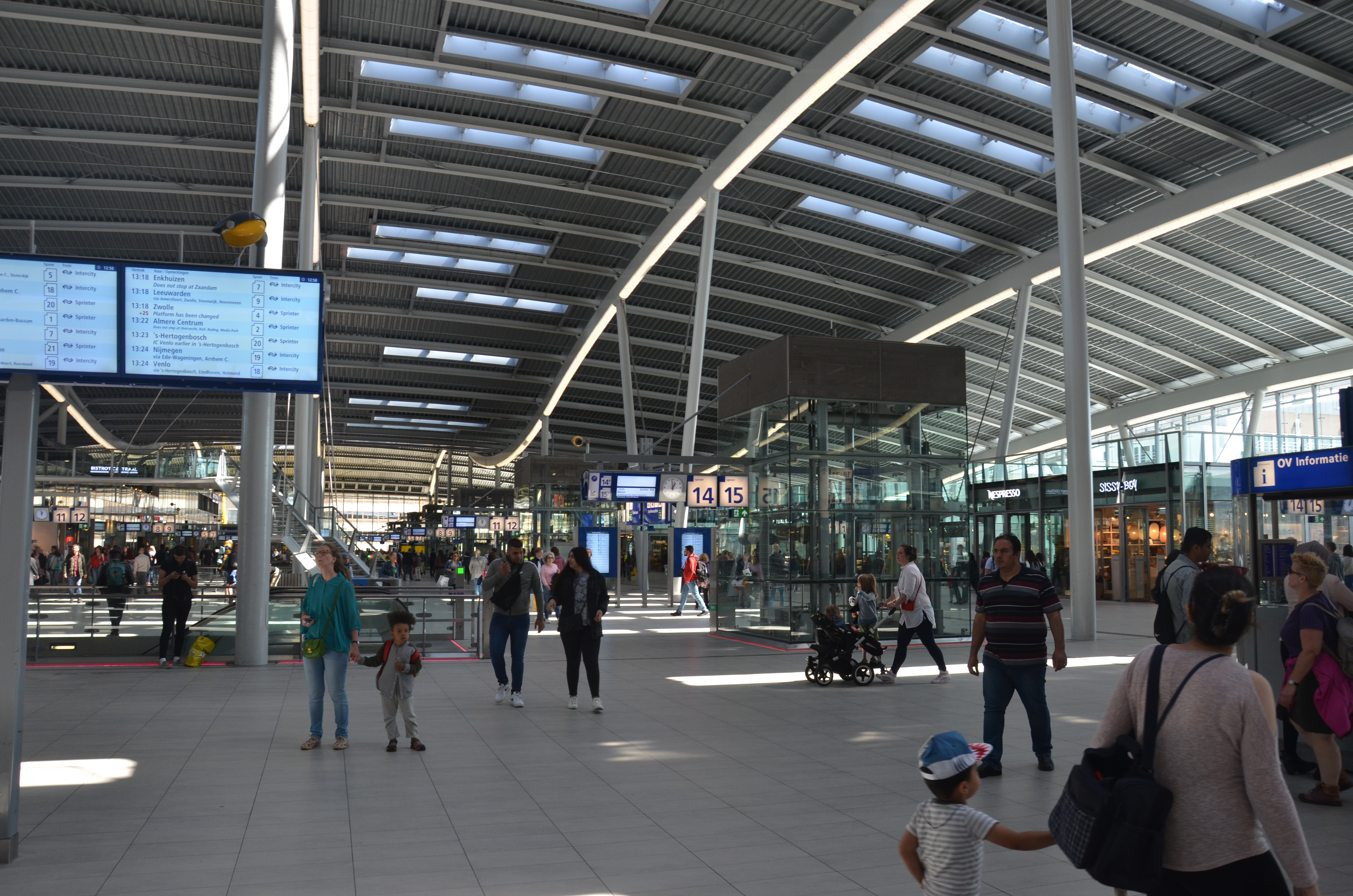
Utrecht Centraal

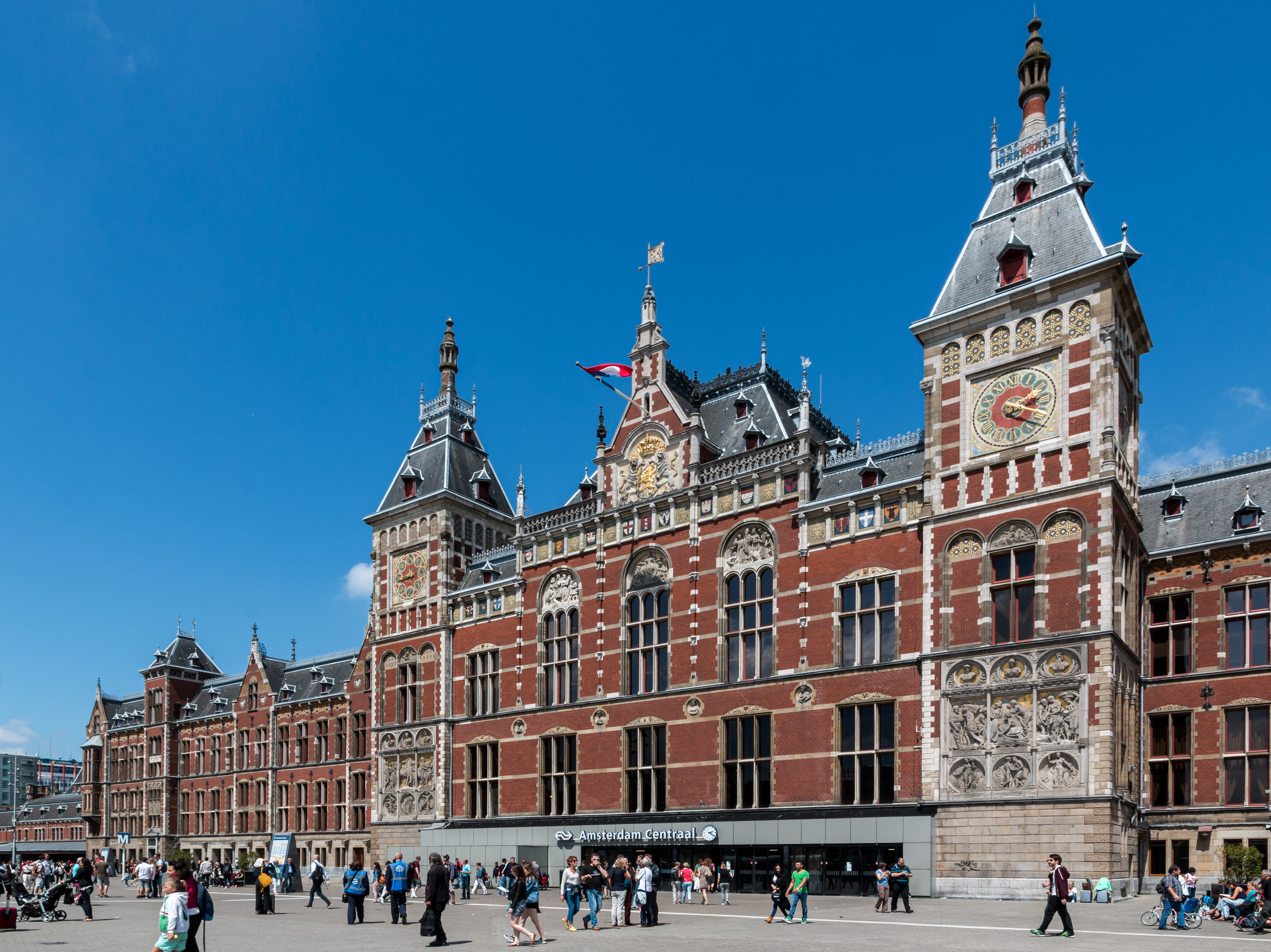
Amsterdam Centraal

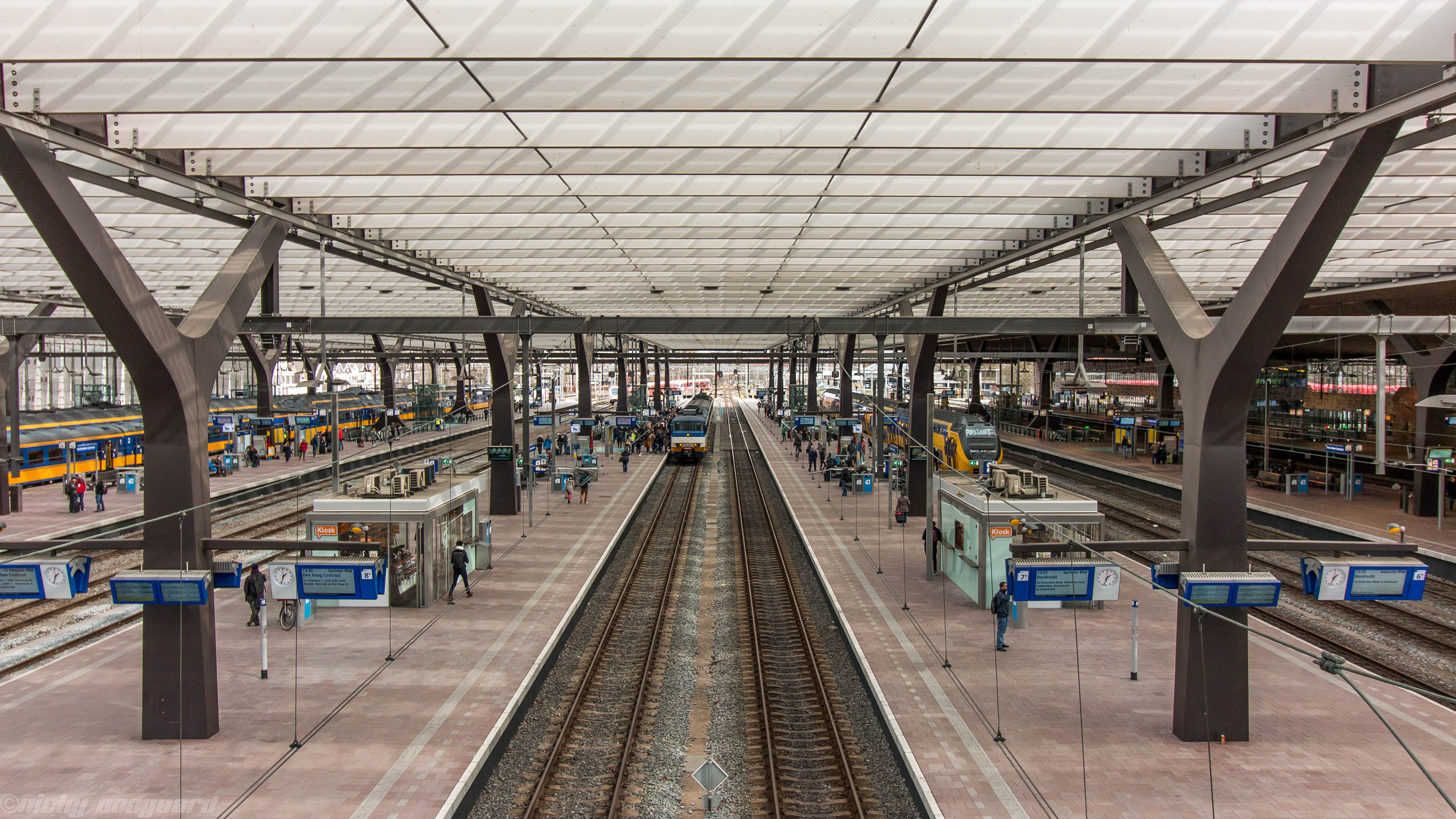
Rotterdam Centraal

The NS covers most of the country, with almost all cities connected, mostly with a service frequency of two trains an hour or more and at least four trains per hour between all of the largest five cities (Amsterdam, Rotterdam, The Hague, Utrecht and Eindhoven) as well as some smaller cities (Nijmegen, Amersfoort, Arnhem, 's-Hertogenbosch, Dordrecht and Leiden). From December 2008 train frequencies were increased on the following services: Arnhem–Nijmegen (8 trains per hour) and The Hague–Rotterdam (12 trains per hour), Amsterdam Centraal–Hoofddorp (16 trains per hour). A night train service was added between Utrecht, Gouda and Rotterdam. Trains usually run between 5:00 a.m. and 1:00 a.m. although there is also a nightline which connects major cities in the Randstad throughout the night, as well as in weekends also some major cities in North Brabant.

In addition to its domestic services, NS is also a partner (along with Stena Line and British railway company Greater Anglia) in the Dutchflyer service. NS has also entered into a partnership with KLM to operate services on the new HSL-Zuid under the name Intercity Direct towards Breda and Brussels. Intercity Direct is part of NS International; other services such as Eurostar to France and Intercity-Express to Germany and Switzerland are also part of NS International.

=== Rail network ===
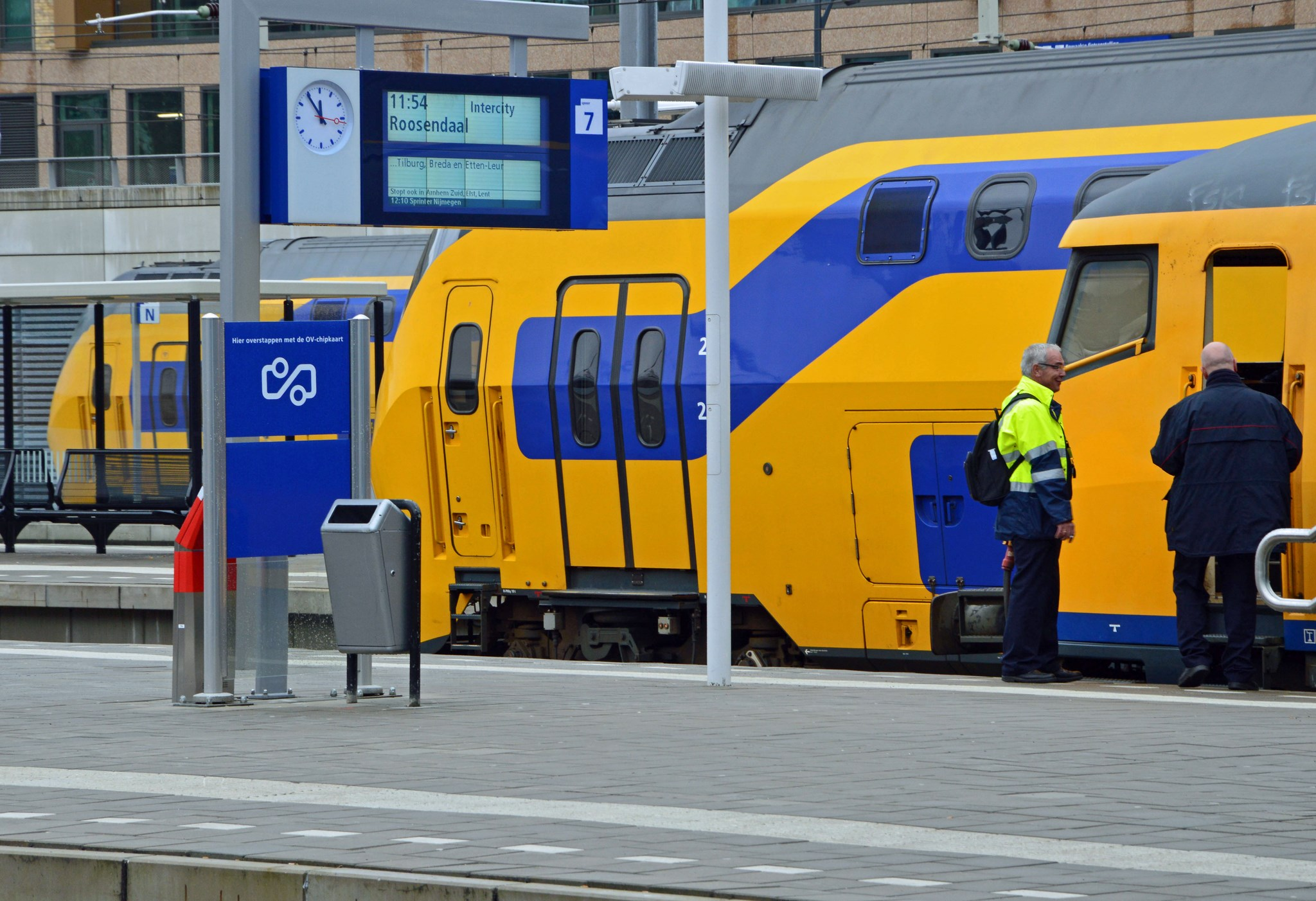
NS trains at Arnhem Centraal

The hoofdrailnet is the official core internal passenger rail network of the Netherlands. Currently, NS has a concession until 1 January 2034 to provide all passenger services on this network, except that on some stretches there is an overlap with lines for which other operators have a concession. Some of the most notable of these stretches are those from Elst railway station to Arnhem Centraal railway station, where NS shares tracks with Arriva, and further on to Arnhem Velperpoort. Here the tracks are shared by three operators, as Breng, ultimately part of Transdev, operates there in addition to the two previously mentioned operators. Officially the overlaps do not constitute competition on the same lines.

The concession was free of charge until 2009, and costs an increasing amount since then, up to €30 million for the year 2014. The concession distinguishes the main stations and other stations. Except on New Year's Eve, the main stations have to be served at least twice an hour per direction from 6 a.m. to midnight and the other stations at least once an hour. Exceptions are possible until the start of the next concession.

The current concession period is 2025–2035. For the 2015–2025 concession, requirements included the use of a train with a toilet for every service where on average more than one-third of the passengers travel longer than 30 minutes, the fitment of a toilet to all newly ordered trains, and a toilet on every train by 2025. The last trains on the hoofdrailnet without a toilet were the NS SGMm (the so-called classical "Sprinter", retired 2018–21) and the Sprinter Lighttrain (SLT, since retrofitted with onboard toilets).

== Types of train service ==
NS runs two primary domestic service types, supplemented by high-speed and international services. [1, 2, 3, 4]

1. A Sprinter (SPR) calls at all stations, and is mainly used for local traffic. On some smaller lines, though, it is the only kind of service. The name is derived from the 'Sprinter' (2900 class) rolling stock; however, the service was sometimes operated using older style rolling stock (such as 'Plan V/T': 400, 500, 800, and 900 class). Since December 2019, all Sprinter services are run exclusively with Sprinter trains.
2. InterCity (IC) services only call at larger stations and were introduced in the 1970s to provide fast train connections throughout the country. Intercity services are operated by DDZ, VIRM and ICM class trains. An exception is the service between The Hague and Eindhoven, which uses the high-speed line between Rotterdam and Breda, which is run by the newly built high-speed ICNG, with the ICR coaches being retired as of October 5th 2025. When a line is not served by Sprinters, Intercity trains call at all stations. All station stops happen at Alkmaar – Den Helder, Hoorn – Enkhuizen, Zwolle - Deventer and Deurne – Venlo. Between Vlissingen and Roosendaal, one service does only call at Intercity stations, while the other calls at all stations. See also Intercity services in the Netherlands and List of Dutch Intercity stations. Keolis also runs one Intercity service an hour, between Zwolle and Enschede, the two largest cities in the province of Overijssel.
3. The Intercity Direct (ICD) service, which offers faster service between Amsterdam Centraal and Breda as it uses the high-speed line HSL-Zuid and calls at only two intermediate stations (Schiphol Airport and Rotterdam Centraal). Unlike other Intercity trains, the Intercity Direct requires payment of a supplement on top of the regular fare (€2.90 during peak hours and €1.74 during off-peak hours) if a passenger's journey involves the high-speed line between Schiphol Airport and Rotterdam Centraal. A regular Intercity service that is free of supplements is still offered. Trains are operated by ICNG. The Intercity Direct service stems from the failure of the Fyra service, which was canceled after the bad performance of the AnsaldoBreda V250 Fyra train sets, which were retired after only 40 days in service.
4. The EuroCity Direct (ECD) service, which, in cooperation with Belgian SNCB, provides a fast connection from Lelystad, via Amsterdam Zuid and Rotterdam to Brussels. This service runs both HSL-Zuid high-speed line and the Belgian HSL-4 high-speed line. Completing the whole route in about 3 hours, this service offers a faster alternative to the EuroCity (EC) from Rotterdam to Brussels. The trains being run on this service are called ICNG-B. They are easily recognizable from their bright yellow look.

There are also two former train categories, which are now used only by private operators:

1. Stoptrein (Stopping train): This is the original name for Sprinter trains. Between 2003 and 2013 NS discharged the Stoptrein formula in favour of Sprinter. Private operators do not use Sprinter so this name is still used by NS for private operators, although private operators often use RS, which is short for Regionaalsprinter (Regional Sprinter).
2. Sneltrein (Fast train): Sneltrein (in the English section of the old paper time tables, they were translated as "semi fast train" and were a class between Stoptrein and Intercity) was abandoned by NS in 2008. The NS Sneltrein services were not abandoned, but were called 'Intercity'. Over the years, some became Sprinters (like the services between Leiden and Utrecht), while most services were integrated in the Intercity network (like the service between Lelystad and Dordrecht). As of 2024, private operators use the term, along with the from Germany imported term RE, which is short for Regionaalexpress (Regional Express).

== Fares and tickets ==
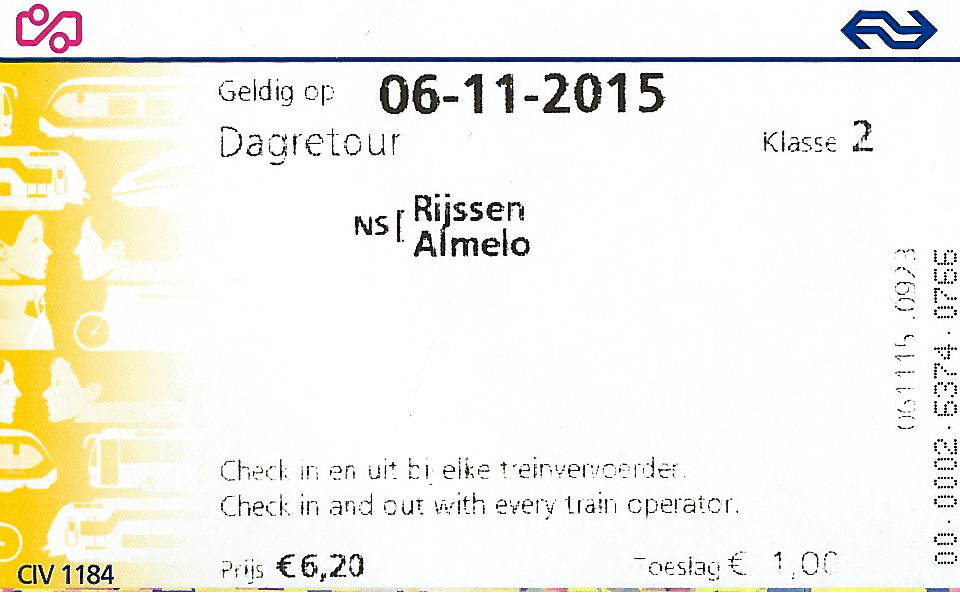
A NS Dagretour valid for a return trip (on a chip card).

One can travel using contactless payment on all Dutch public transport: on all domestic trains, metros, trams and buses, nationwide. Using contactless to travel provides a passenger with a full-price second-class ticket. The price is the same as using the anonymous OV-chipcard (see below). One does not need an app or ticket, nor do you have to register or signup to use this. Apple Pay, Google Pay and many contactless debit and credit cards are accepted.

A brief instruction: At the start of your journey, keep your smartphone or bank card on the reader to check-in. At the end of your journey, or if you transfer to a different operator, check-out in the same way. If you use a bank card, be sure to remove it from your wallet, to ensure that the system uses the right card. The costs will be shown in your bank transfer statement the next day, along with a website link and code to get your travel itinerary.

The OV-chipkaart is another common form of fare payment. Single or return tickets, used by incidental travellers and tourists, are available at ticket machines and service counters at a surcharge of €1.50. These are disposable and single-use only. It is possible to buy e-tickets online on the NS website, as well as on the Belgian NMBS/SNCB B-Europe website. For long-term use, season tickets are available.

Travelling with these cards and tickets, one has to register starting a journey (check-in) and ending it (check out) at the destination. One always has to travel away from the point of one's latest check-in. Thus, in the case of a voluntary detour, one has to check out and check in to register starting a new journey.

Travellers need to be aware of the various train operators other than the Nederlandse Spoorwegen. One needs to check out with one and check in with another if transferring at some stations. There is a common tariff system with four smaller passenger train operators: Keolis Nederland and Connexxion in the centre and the east, Arriva on the 'Maaslijn' and 'Heuvellandlijn' in the southeast as well as in the north and most of the east of the country. The 'Merwede-Lingelijn' (from Dordrecht to Geldermalsen) is operated by Qbuzz.

The OV-chipkaart is also used on buses and trams, where hourly tickets are for sale for those who have too little credit to travel but enough cash.

=== Off-peak discount passes ===
NS defines off-peak hours as weekdays from 09:00–16:00 and 18:30–06:30, and on Saturdays and Sundays the whole day. Therefore, the full fare is required on weekdays 06:30–09:00 and 16:00–18:30. With an OV-chipkaart that allows for a discount or free travel, one is automatically granted the discount or free travel at the time of checking in. There are several season tickets available that suit individual preferences.

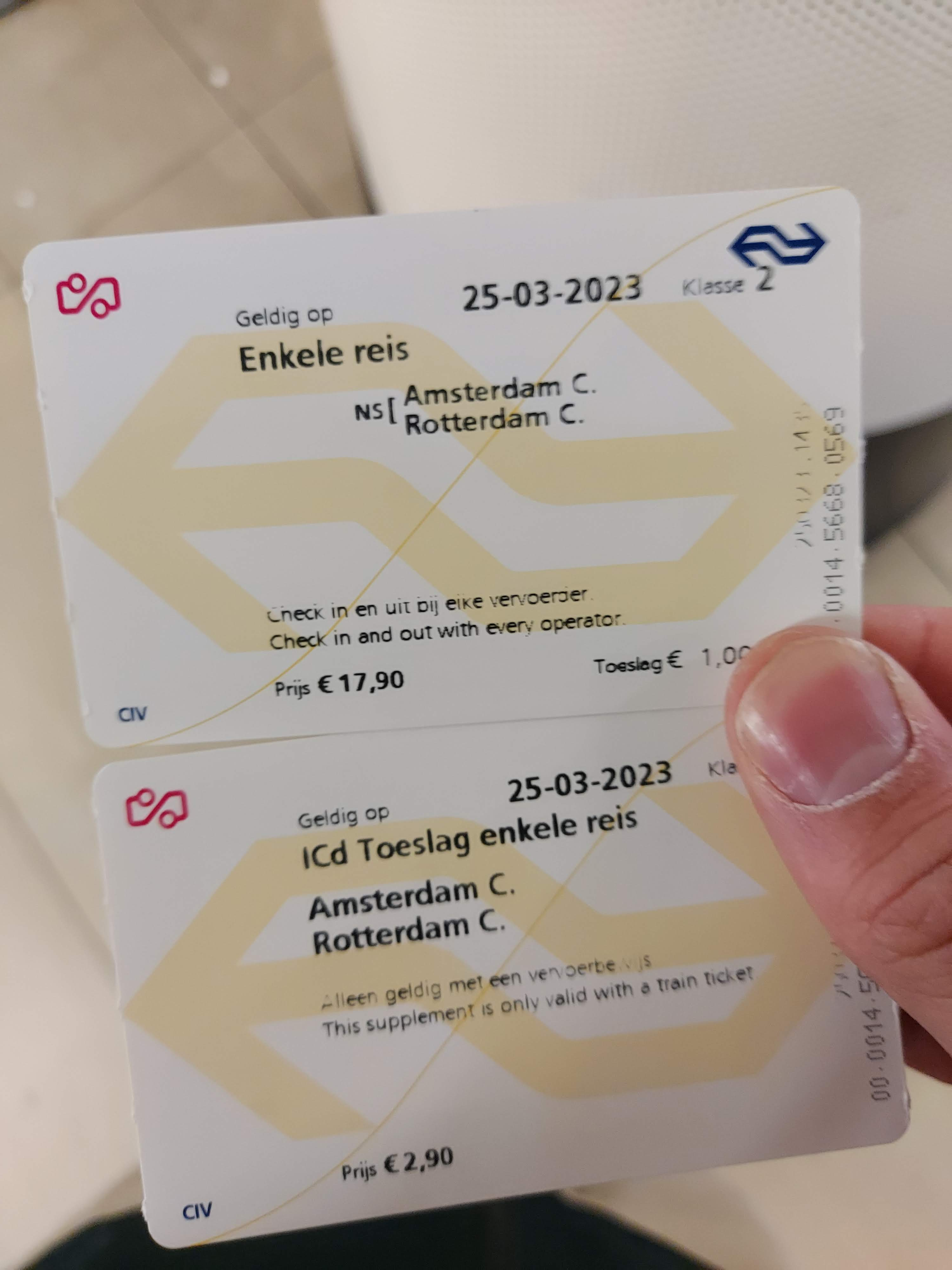
NS ticket and supplement (Amsterdam to Rotterdam, with Intercity supplement)

== Logo ==
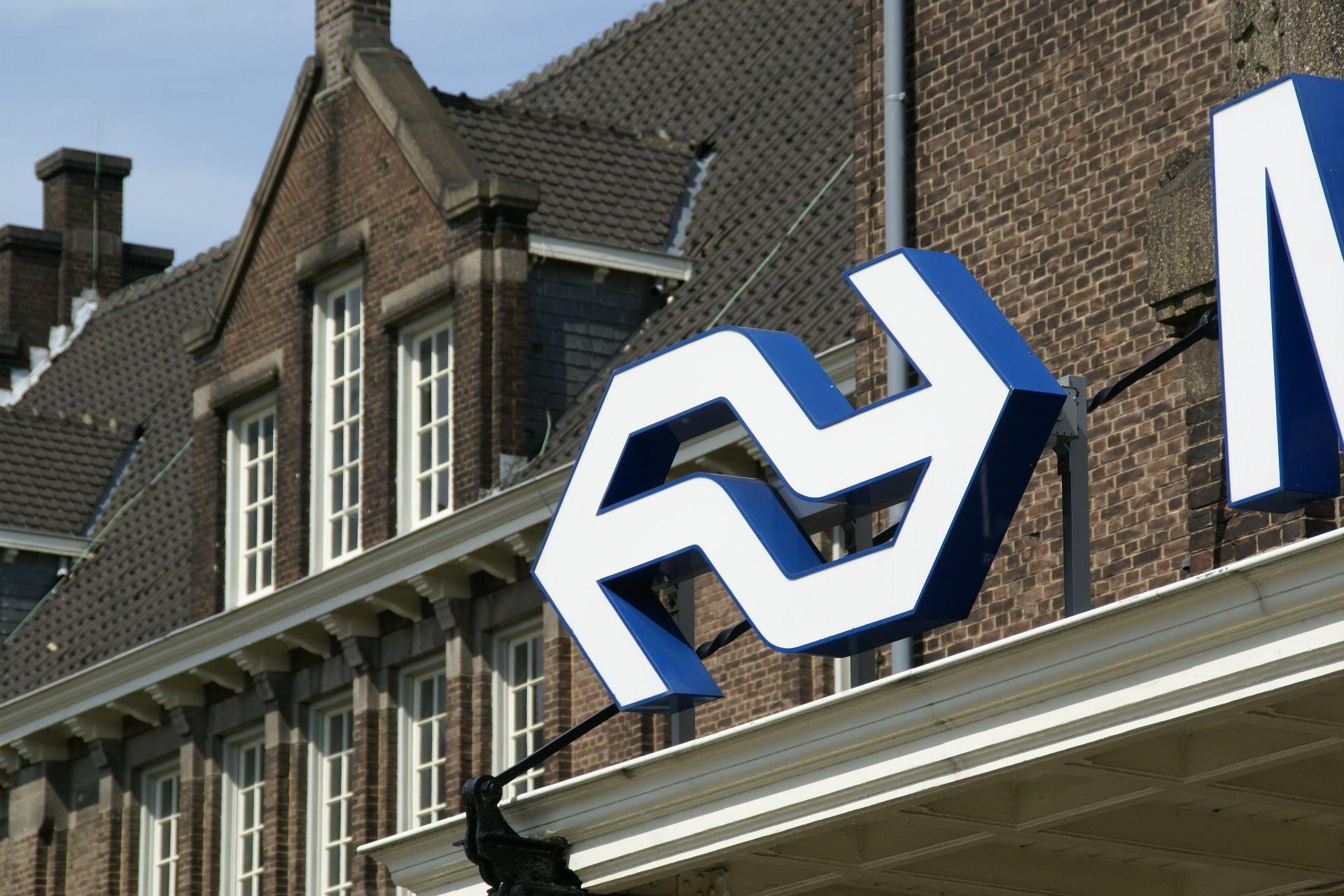
Logo at Maastricht station in 2010

The NS corporate logo was designed in 1968 by Gert Dumbar and Gert-Jan Leuvelink, both of the graphic design company Tel Design. Introduced in that same year, it replaced an earlier design which had been used since 1946. The logo, pervasive within trains and railway stations in the Netherlands, plays a significant part in Nederlandse Spoorwegen's signage, promotions, advertising, and graphic design.

The logo usually appears in blue or black on a dark yellow or white background. Since its introduction, NS livery has also had this same distinct dark yellow or white colour. The logo is a widened letter N for Nederlandse. The two arrows in the logo represent the train's movement, and the two lines in the middle represent the track.

== Divisions of NS ==
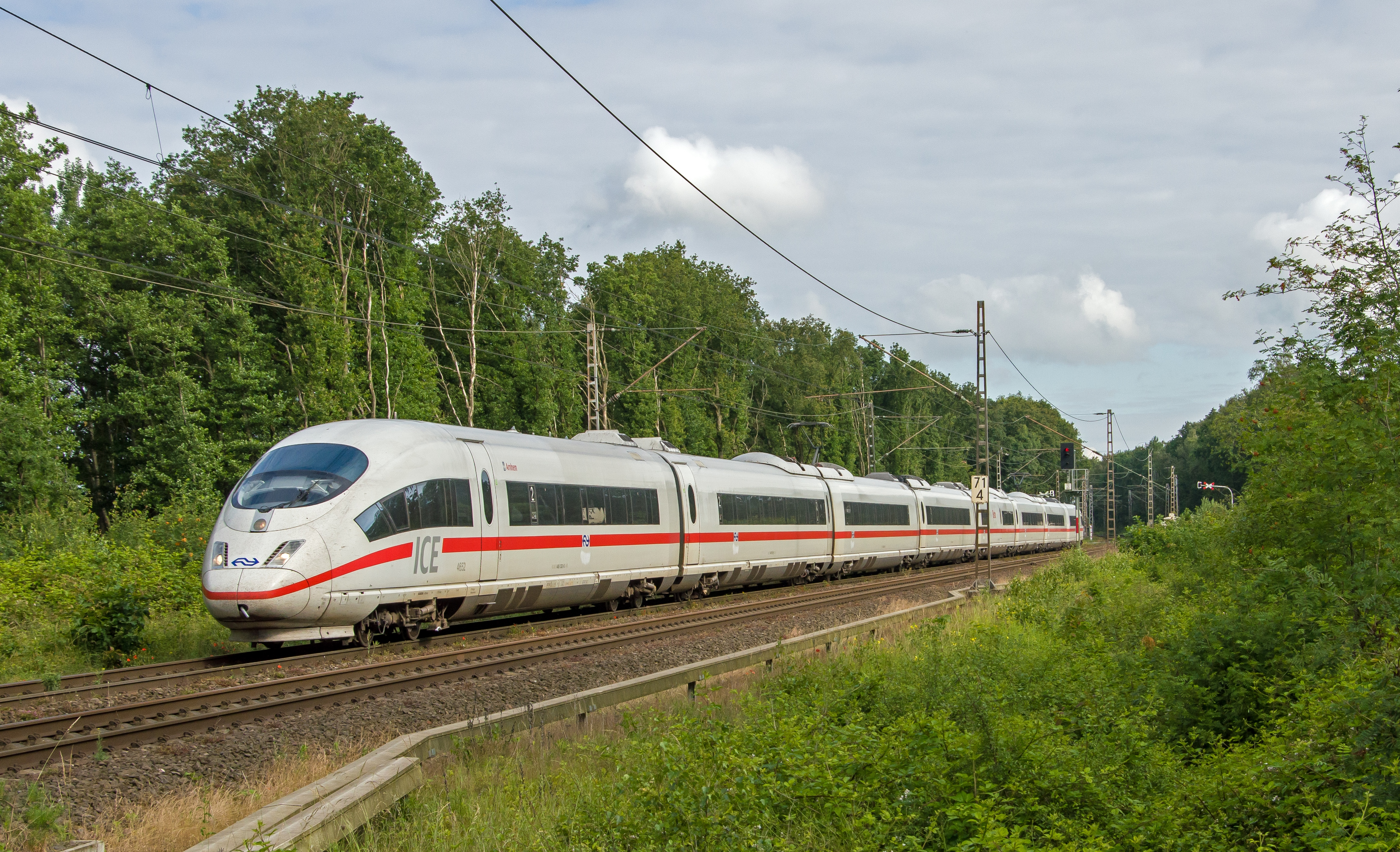
NS International ICE 3 in June 2014

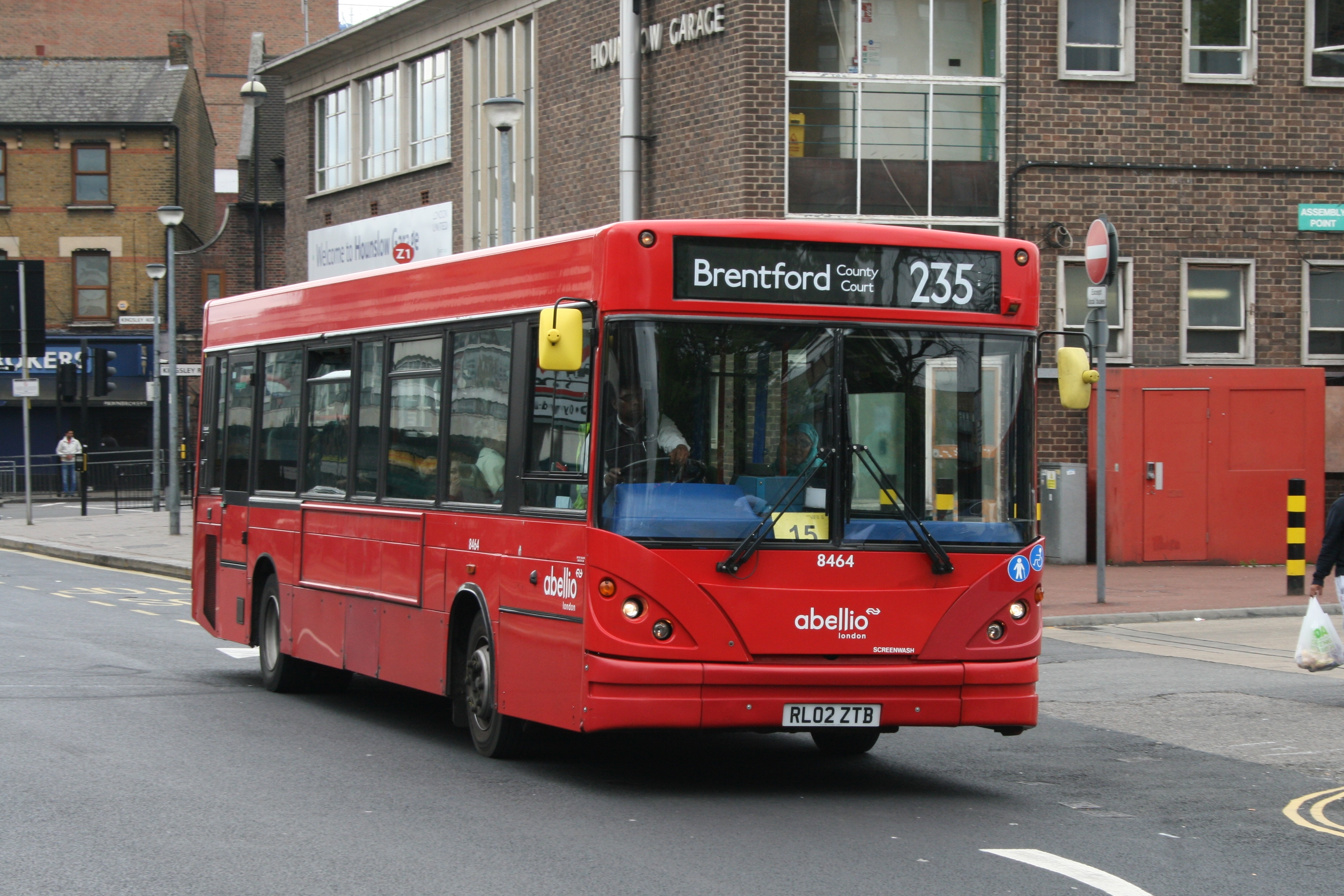
Abellio bus in London, UK

- Abellio – the subsidiary for operations outside the Netherlands. Abellio has operated franchises in the United Kingdom and Germany.

In 2003, Abellio commenced operating its first rail concession in the United Kingdom, through its 50% shareholding in a joint venture with Serco, with Serco also holding 50%. From 2004 until 2016, Serco and Abellio also operated the Northern Rail franchise. In May 2009, the Travel London and Travel Surrey bus businesses were purchased from National Express and rebranded as Abellio London and Abellio Surrey.

In February 2012, Abellio Greater Anglia commenced operating the Greater Anglia franchise, and in April 2015, Abellio ScotRail commenced operating the ScotRail franchise. In 2016, Abellio successfully bid to retain the renamed East Anglia franchise until 2025. Abellio partnered with Mitsui for both the East Anglia and the West Midlands franchises, the latter also with JR East. In June 2019 Abellio began operating the East Midlands Railway eight-year franchise.

In February 2023 Abellio sold its UK operations to Transport UK Group.

- NS Reizigers (NSR) – NS Travellers, responsible for passenger train services and for employing train drivers and conductors.
- NS Stations – the result of merging the former :
  - NS Stations – in charge of the operation of all 404 railway stations in the Netherlands, i.e., also those served by other railway companies than NS Reizigers; see also station facilities.
  - NS Vastgoed – owns 48 km^{2} of land, often near stations, and develops and operates these areas as public traffic nodes, offices and apartments.
- NedTrain – train maintenance.
- NS Commercie – product- and customer management (business and product development, marketing, sales and customer service).
- NS International – operator, in conjunction with NS Reizigers and foreign partners, of Thalys (from Amsterdam to Paris), ICE (to Cologne, Munich and Frankfurt), Intercities (to Berlin) and Intercity Direct services (to Brussels via the HSL-Zuid) and the Nightjet (to Vienna and Innsbruck).

In dealing with the general public, these distinctions are not made and the terms Nederlandse Spoorwegen and NS are used.

NS has contracts with Connexxion and BBA, now Veolia Transport for the provision of bus services to replace train services in the case of planned and unplanned cancellations.

On 23 July 2010 NS sold Strukton to the construction company Oranjewoud N.V.. This concluded a long history of planning, designing and executing track development done by the NS.

== Policy ==
There is a delay refund scheme entitling passengers to a partial or full refund of the ticket price if a journey is delayed by half an hour or more. The scheme does not apply on short-distance journeys (tickets less than €2.30) and cases in which the delay is the result of planned cancellations that were announced some days in advance. Refunds are, in general, half the ticket price of a one-way trip after a delay of over 30 minutes, and the full ticket price after a delay of one hour or more. That applies to nearly all kinds of tickets. The refund is not considered monetary compensation for lost time but rather as a reduction in charges where poor service has been provided. The system has been improved for holders of some rail passes. Part of the cost of the scheme is paid by ProRail, since they are responsible for part of the delays.

Tobacco smoking is prohibited both on trains and in stations. Smoking on trains has been prohibited since 2004, with smoking in stations permitted in designated smoking zones, until this too was disallowed in October 2020.

Since June 2003, the sale of coffee, soft drinks, beer, sandwiches, candy, etc., has ceased aboard domestic trains. The increasing number of Servex convenience stores at railway stations and the relatively short duration of most train journeys in the Netherlands have lowered the demand for on-train services. In 2005, a much reduced in-train service of drinks and small snacks has been reintroduced on longer journeys. Now, the RailTender service primarily operates in the intercity trains on the trajectory between Utrecht and Zwolle/Eindhoven, Zwolle and Almere, 's-Hertogenbosch and Nijmegen, Apeldoorn and Amersfoort, Rotterdam and Breda/Roosendaal/Antwerp.

=== Technological assistance for train staff ===
Conductors have a smartphone with a timetable, fares information, and a separate card reader to read the OV-chipkaart. Train drivers use a tablet with an app called "TimTim" to save energy and keep up with the timetable. The train driver can also see other trains in front or behind their train.

== Statistics ==
The NS handled 14.73 billion passenger km per year (2005), which is 30% of the seat km. In 2018, NS saw its number of passengers increase by nearly 3 percent. On average, 1.3 million people took the train on a weekday, 100.000 more than in 2016 and the over 250 NS train stations are becoming increasingly crowded.

== See also ==
- Dutch railway services
- Rail transport by country
- Rail transport in the Netherlands
- Railway stations in the Netherlands
- Train categories in Europe
- Train routes in the Netherlands
- Trains in the Netherlands
- Transport in the Netherlands
