= Travel London =

London bus operator

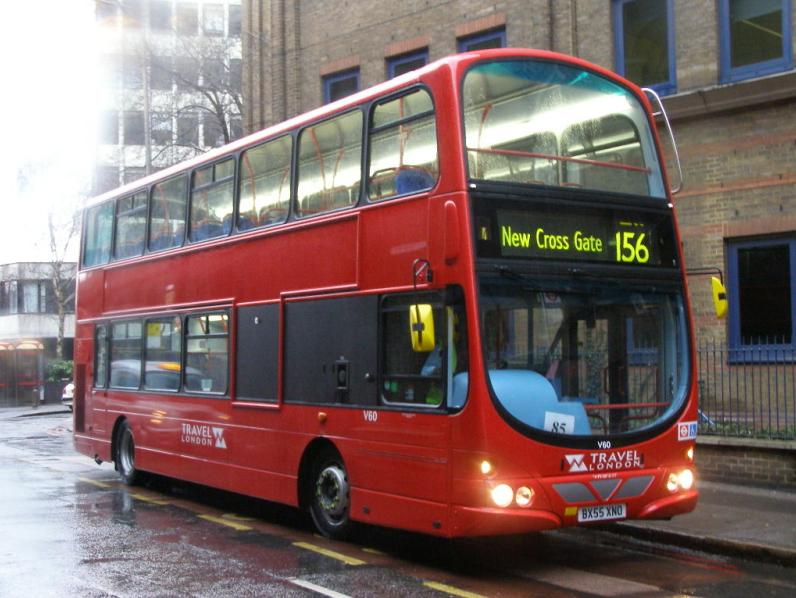
- Wright Eclipse Gemini bodied Volvo B7TL in February 2006
- Parent: National Express Group
- Founded: February 2004; 21 years ago
- Defunct: May 2009; 16 years ago
- Headquarters: Battersea, London Borough of Wandsworth, South West London
- Service area: Greater London
- Service type: London bus services
- Routes: 36
- Fleet: 411
- Website: www.travellondonbus.co.uk

Travel London was a bus company operating services in Greater London. It was a subsidiary of the National Express Group before being sold in May 2009 to NedRailways. In October 2009, it was rebranded as Abellio London.

== History ==
In November 1997, Birmingham bus operator and National Express Group subsidiary Travel West Midlands (TWM) was awarded seven-year London Regional Transport contracts to operate routes C1 and 211 from June 1998. TWM formed a new subsidiary company, Travel London, to operate these routes, with new Optare Solo and Optare Excel buses purchased to run the routes using similar branding to TWM but painted into a predominantly red livery featuring blue and white highlights.

In August 2000, National Express sold the business to Limebourne, who in July 2001 sold out to Connex. In February 2004, National Express repurchased the business. Further expansion in 2005 saw the purchases of the London bus operations of Tellings-Golden Miller, acquiring depots in Twickenham, Hayes and Byfleet as well as various Surrey County Council contracts.

Travel London operated contracts on behalf of Transport for London, Surrey County Council, and Kingston University. Operations were split between three registered companies; Travel London Limited, Travel London (West) Limited, and Travel London (Middlesex) Limited. Surrey services were rebranded as Travel Surrey in September 2007.

In November 2007, National Express announced plans to re-brand all of their operations under a new unified National Express identity. Travel London was to be rebranded as National Express London however this was shelved and all bus operations retained their existing identities.

In May 2009, National Express sold Travel London to NedRailways. The sale included 66 routes: 36 Transport for London tendered services and 30 Surrey County Council and Kingston University routes. All vehicles, depots and staff were included.

On 30 October 2009, the businesses were rebranded as Abellio London and Abellio Surrey.

== Travel London Limited ==
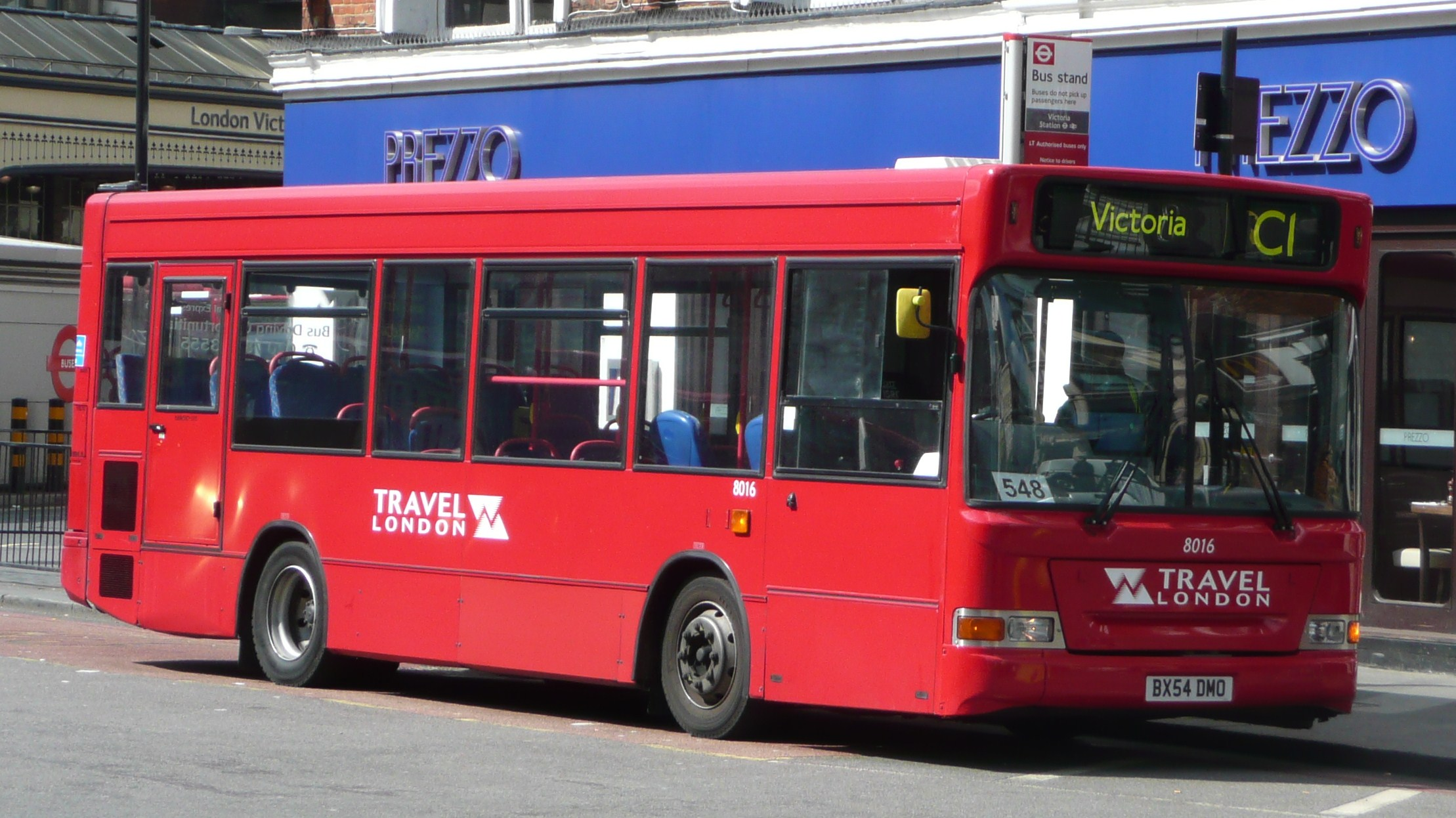
Plaxton Pointer MPD bodied Dennis Dart on route C1 at Victoria station in April 2008

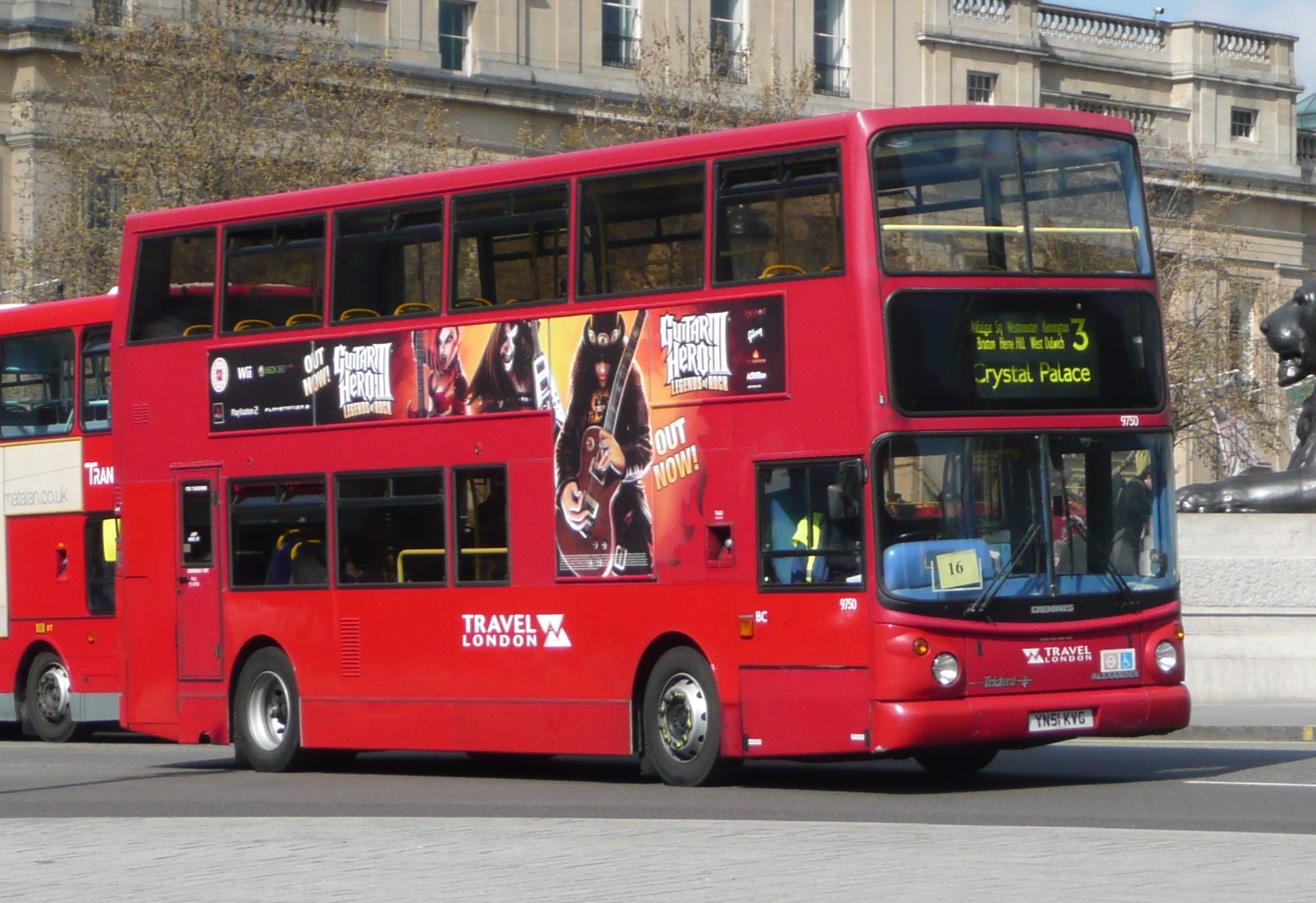
Alexander ALX400 bodied Dennis Trident 2 on route 3 at Trafalgar Square in April 2008

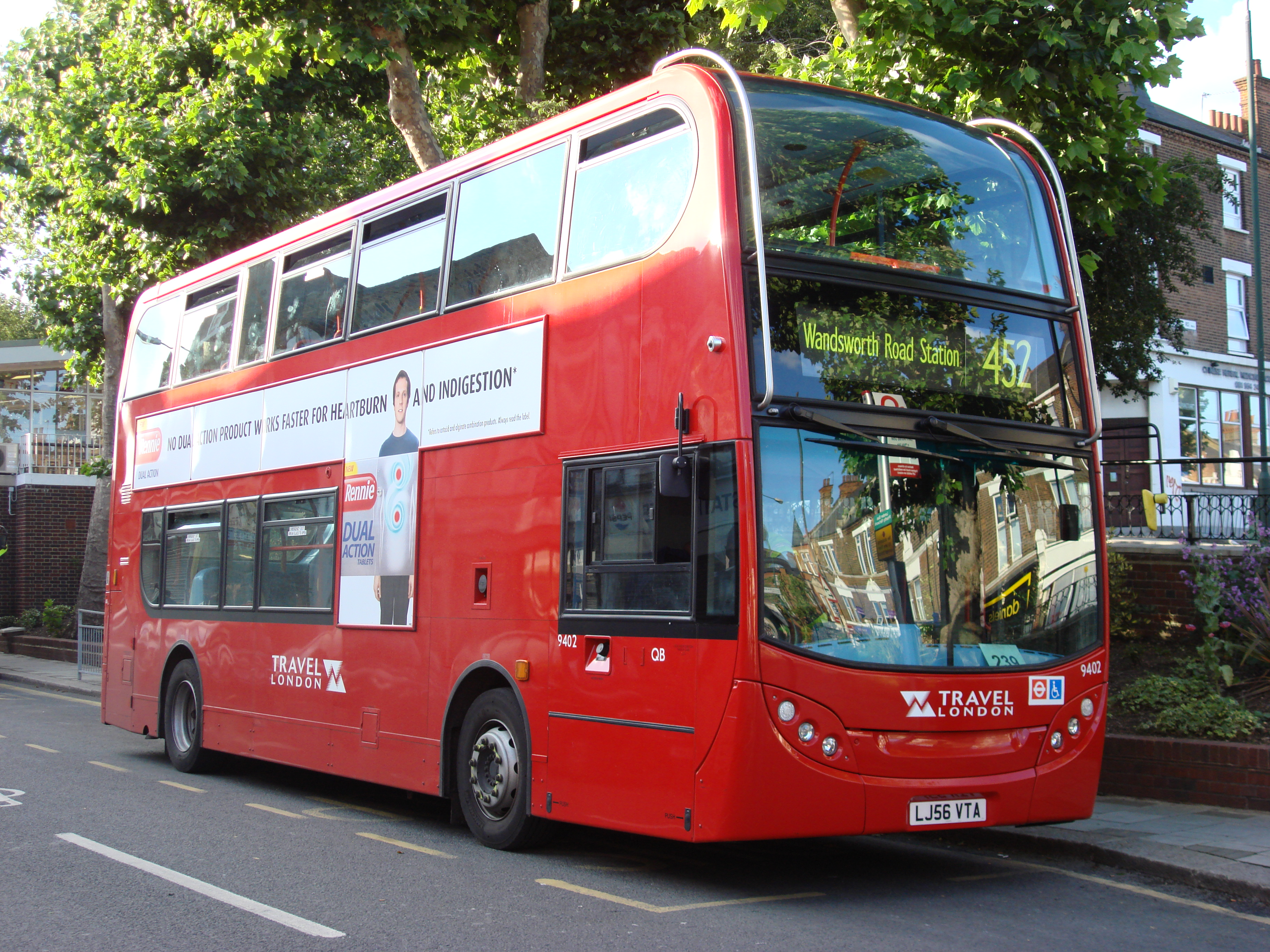
Alexander Dennis Enviro400 on route 452 in June 2007

Travel London Limited operated garages at Beddington Cross, Queenstown (Battersea) and Walworth Road, operating 66, 82 and 98 buses respectively (246 in total) when the company was renamed.

Beddington Cross operated London Buses routes 3, 152, 157, 434, G1, P13, and night route N3, and was opened by Connex in 2000 to house their newly won route 3.

Queenstown operated routes 35, 156, 211, 452, C3, 24-hour route 344 and night route N35.

Walworth Road (WL) operated routes 40, 100, 129, 188, 343, 381, C1, night routes N343 and N381. This garage, dating back to 1901, had laid dormant on lease by Go-Ahead Group for six years until late 2003, when work started on refurbishing the garage for Travel London following contract gains for routes in South London. When reopened on 24 February 2005 by Mayor of London Ken Livingstone, it was the first bus garage in London to be powered with solar panels.

Travel London won the contract for route 407, starting from 31 October 2009. This was used as the launch of the new Abellio name.

== Travel London (West) Limited ==
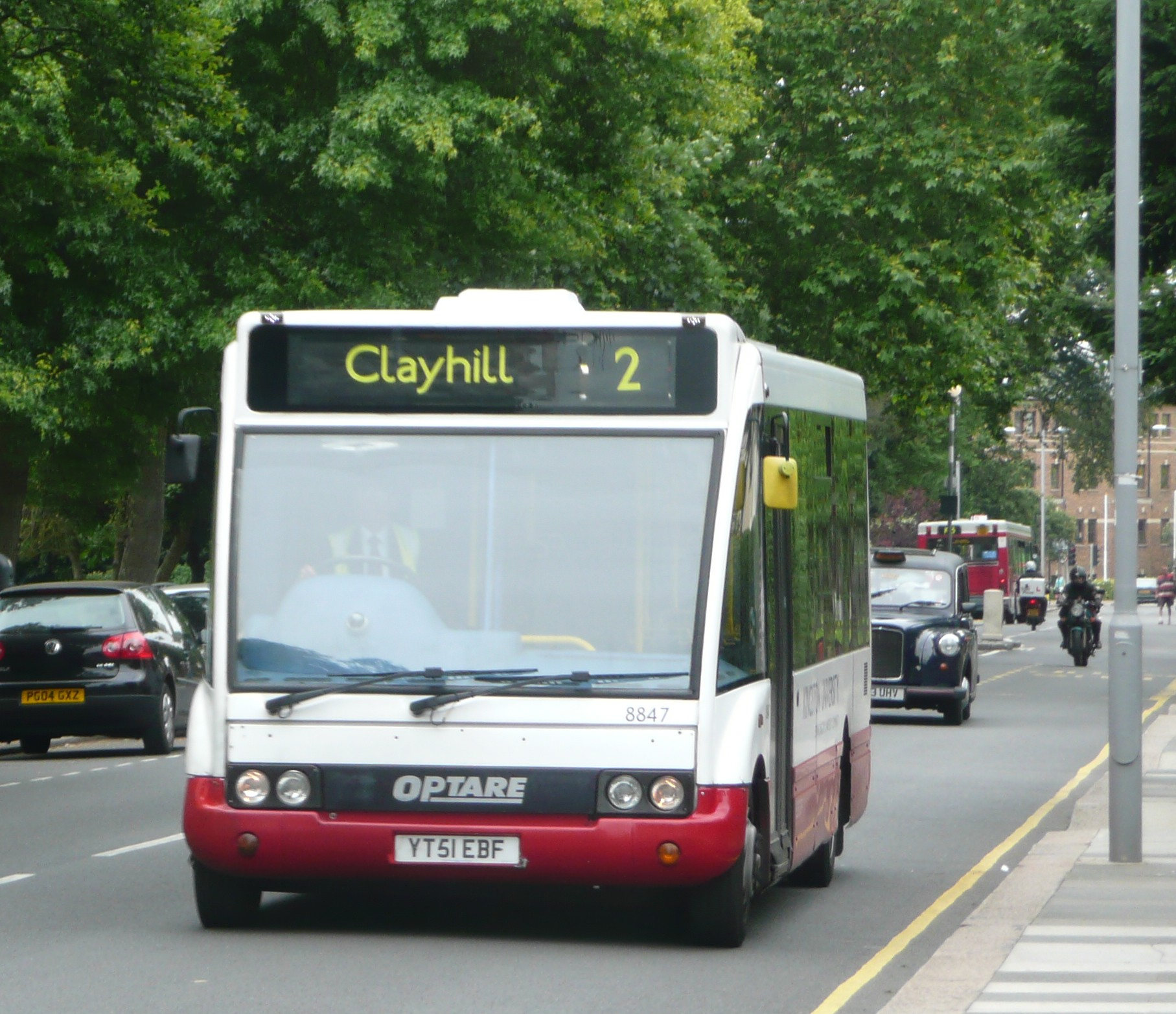
Optare Solo on Kingston University route KU2 in Surbiton in July 2008

Travel London (West) Limited operated the garages at Fulwell and Byfleet, the Byfleet depot being rebranded Travel Surrey in September 2007. Respectively, the depots operated approximately 94 and 50 buses (146 in total). Fulwell operated London Buses routes 235, 481, 490, H20, H25, H26, R68 and R70. Byfleet operated Surrey County Council tendered routes 218, 400, 426, 438, 441, 446, 451, 461, 471, 472, 513, 514, 515, 515A, 555, 557, 564, 566, 567, 570, 571, 572, 574, 637, 662, 663 and 690. Fulwell garage also operated Kingston University routes KU1, KU2, and KU3, until the contract was lost to Tellings-Golden Miller in 2009.

== Travel London (Middlesex) Limited ==
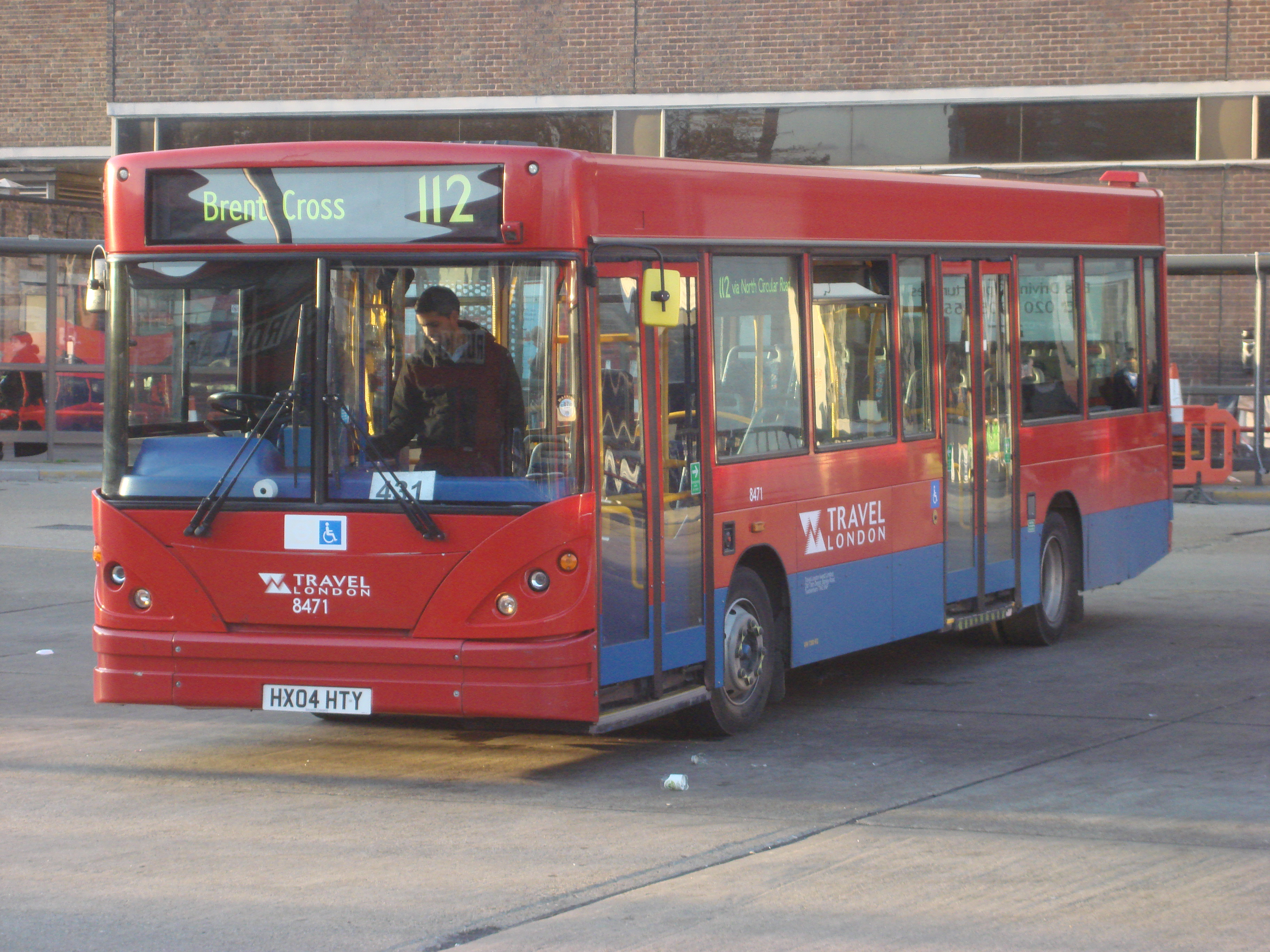
Caetano Nimbus bodied Dennis Dart SLF on route 112 at Brent Cross bus station in October 2008

Travel London (Middlesex) Limited operated one garage in Hayes. It operated 19 buses on London Buses routes 112, 350, H28 and U7.
