= Travel Surrey =

Former bus company

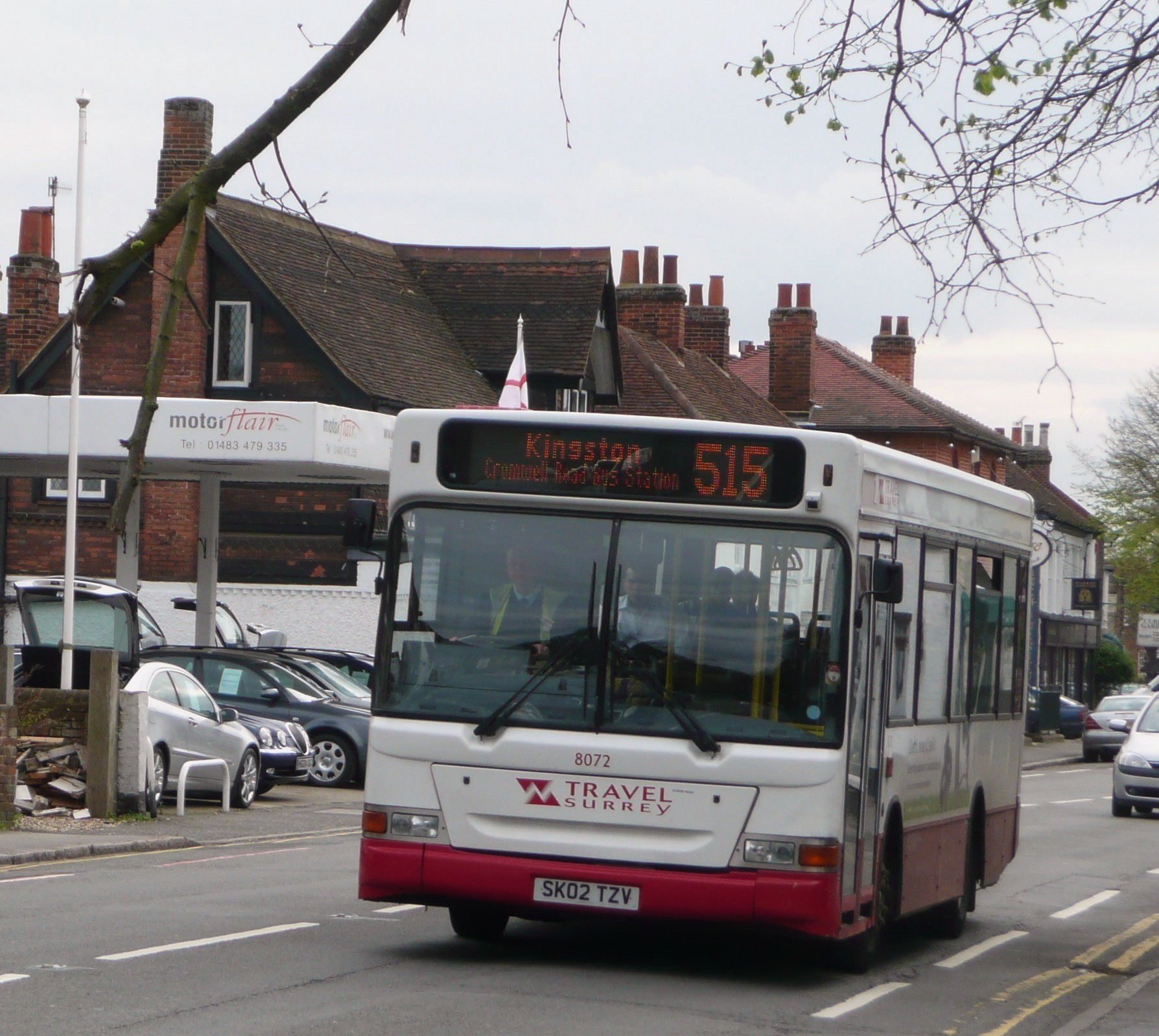
- Plaxton Pointer 2 bodied Dennis Dart SLF in Ripley in April 2008
- Founded: 2006
- Defunct: 2009
- Headquarters: Byfleet
- Service area: Surrey
- Service type: Bus services
- Destinations: Guildford; Heathrow Airport; Kingston-upon-Thames; Staines; Woking
- Fleet: Circa 50
- Operator: National Express Group
- Website: www.travelsurreybus.co.uk

Travel Surrey was a bus company operating services in Surrey. It was a subsidiary of National Express before being sold in May 2009 to NedRailways. In October 2009, it was rebranded as Abellio Surrey.

== History ==
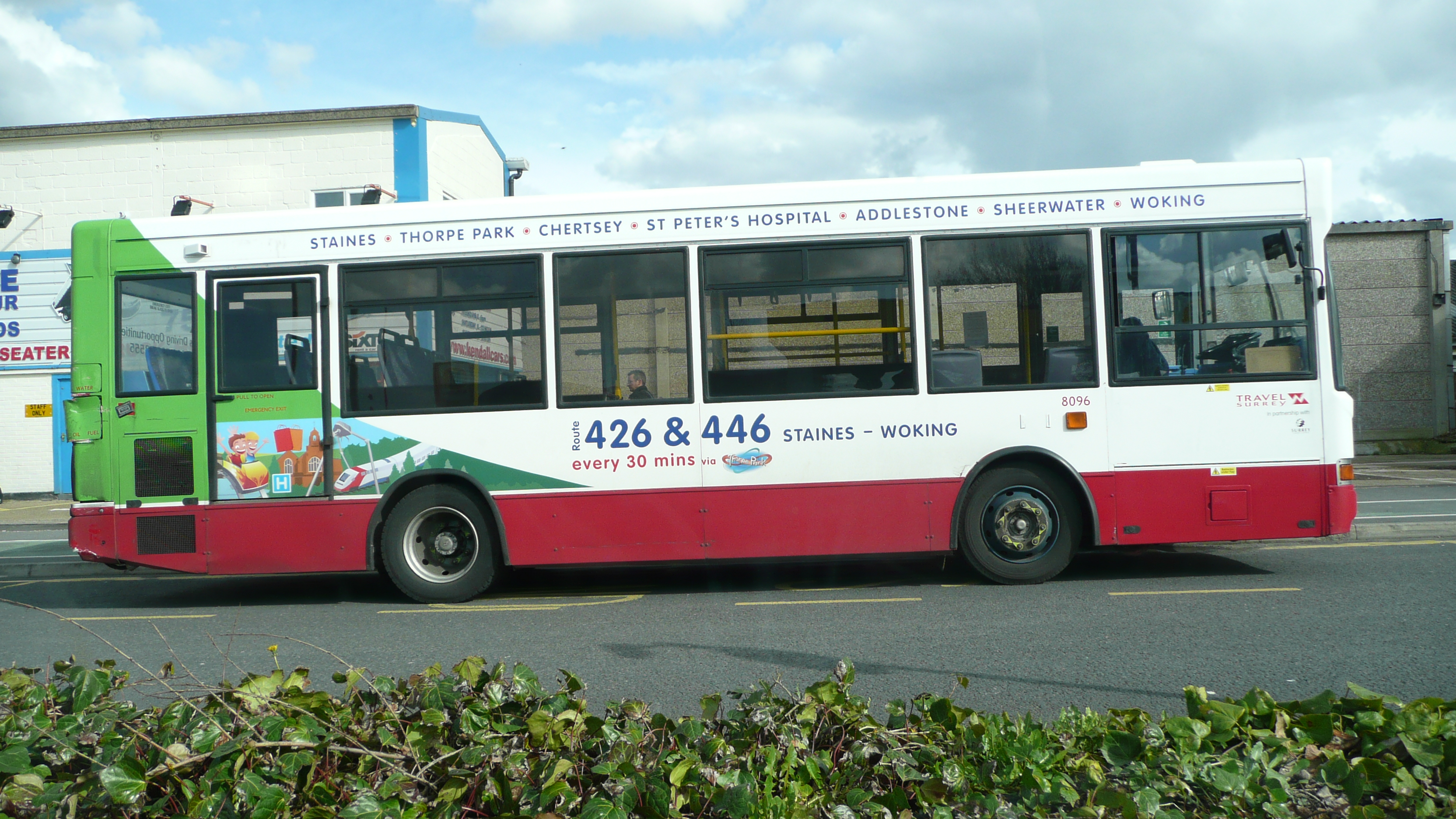
Plaxton Pointer 2 bodied Dennis Dart SLP in the green-based branding used on routes 426 and 446 in Woking in March 2008

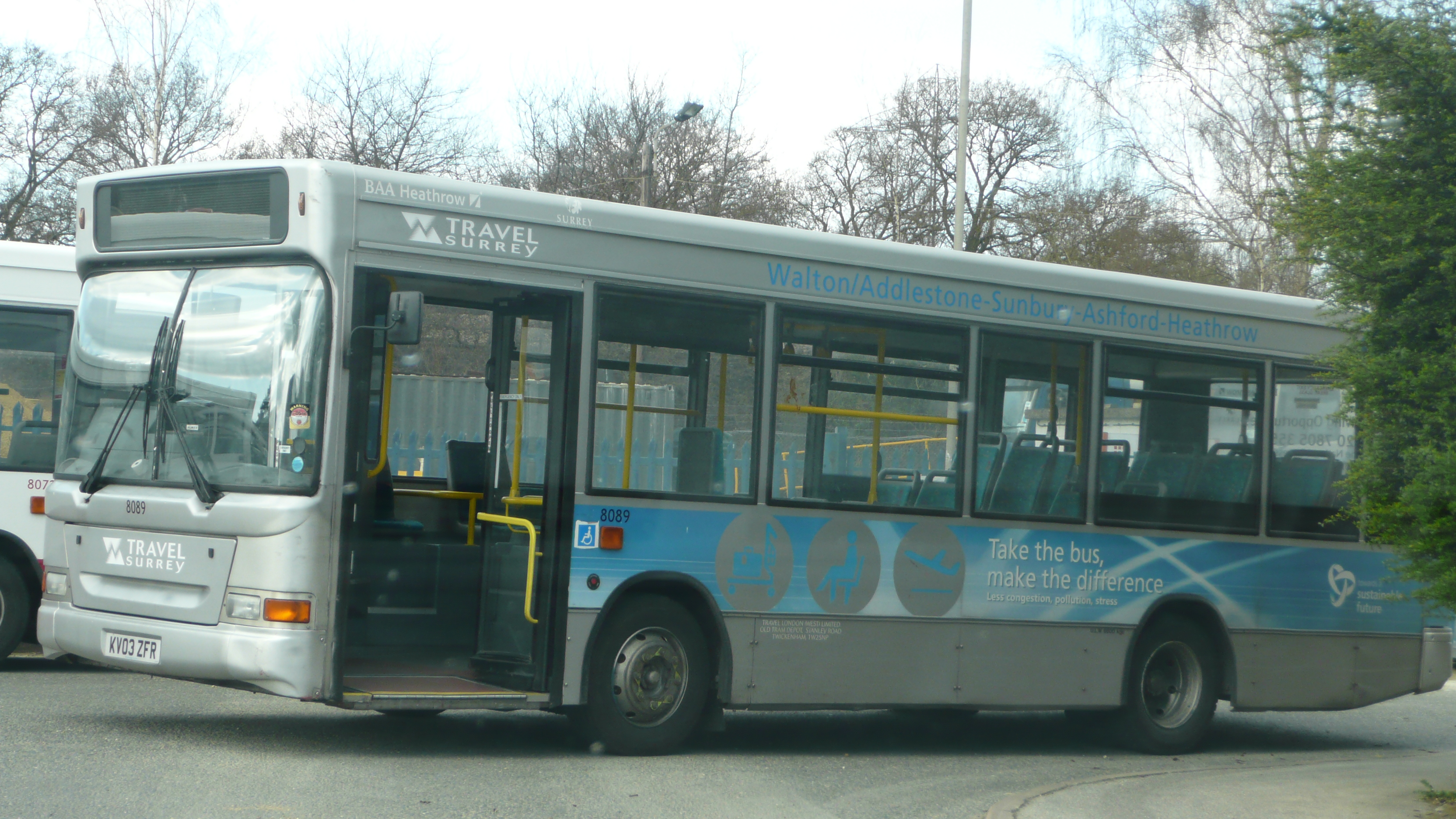
Plaxton Pointer 2 bodied Dennis Dart SLF one of the silver buses for routes 555/557 and originally 556 in Byfleet in March 2008

In June 2005, National Express purchased the London bus operations of Tellings-Golden Miller and integrated them into their Travel London subsidiary. This sale also included Tellings-Golden Millar's Byfleet depot. The legal company name was Travel London (West) Limited. It traded as Travel London. All vehicles underwent a repaint with the blue and white colours replaced with a livery of white with a red skirt.

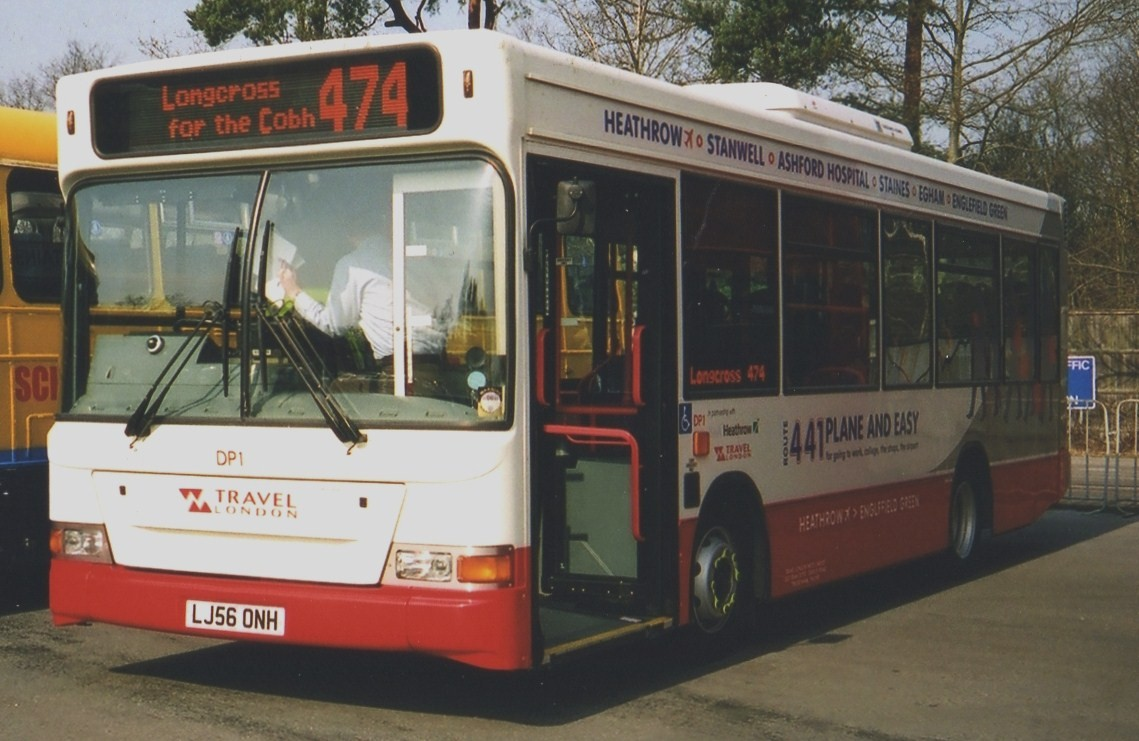
Plaxton Pointer 2 bodied Dennis Dart SLF with route 441 branding in April 2007

On 1 September 2007, the Byfleet service were rebranded as Travel Surrey. After National Express took over, some of the Surrey County Council tender routes were lost or given up. However, many are now operated once again. An example of this is the 426/446 Woking - Staines service, which was operated by Flights Hallmark, trading as Surrey Connect. However, Flights wound up their operation, so Travel Surrey took over the routes and some vehicles.

In November 2007 National Express announced plans to re-brand all of their operations under a new unified National Express identity. Travel Surrey was to be rebranded as National Express Surrey however this was shelved and all bus operations retained their existing identities.

In May 2009 National Express sold Travel Surrey to NedRailways. The sale included 27 Surrey County Council and Kingston University routes. All vehicles, depots and staff were included.

On 30 October 2009 the businesses were rebranded as Abellio London and Abellio Surrey.

== Garage ==
Travel Surrey operated one depot in Byfleet. It was in two parts, held 50 buses, and operated Surrey County Council routes 218, 400, 426, 438, 441, 446, 451, 461, 471, 472, 513, 514, 515, 515A, 555, 557, 564, 566, 567, 570, 571, 572, 574, 637, 662, 663, 690. The parts were at either end of the Wintersells Industrial Estate.

== Branded routes ==
A number of services were branded with buses running in special colours, and continue to be so under Abellio.

- 441 - Plane and Easy: This route is run between Heathrow Airport and Englefield Green via Staines, and is supported by BAA. It received new buses in 2006, with grey swoops at the rear.
- 426/446: These routes were branded with green swoops at the rear, it was notable in serving Thorpe Park, which was included in the branding.
- 555/557: These routes were run with silver liveried buses, and were run with BAA support, between Heathrow Central bus station and Walton-on-Thames railway station.
