= Abellio (transport company) =

Dutch public transport company operating in Europe

- Industry: Public transport
- Founded: 2001
- Headquarters: Utrecht, Netherlands
- Area served: Current Germany Past Czech Republic Netherlands United Kingdom
- Key people: Jeff Hoogesteger (CEO)
- Owner: Nederlandse Spoorwegen
- Subsidiaries: Abellio Deutschland; WestfalenBahn

Abellio (Dutch pronunciation: [aːˈbɛlijoː]) is a Dutch public transport company that operates bus and rail services in Germany, and formerly also in Czech Republic, the Netherlands, and the United Kingdom. It is wholly owned by the Dutch national railway company, Nederlandse Spoorwegen (NS).

Created in 2004 by EVAG, the city council-owned public transit company of Essen, the company initially operated as NedRailways. It promptly expanded into both railway and bus operations in the region. British investment company Star Capital Partners purchased a 75% share in Abellio from the City of Essen in December 2005. In December 2008, both parties sold their stakes in the venture to the Dutch national railway company, Nederlandse Spoorwegen (NS). It adopted the current Abellio branding in January 2010.

== Current operations ==
=== Germany ===
As of April 2020, Abellio Deutschland operates 50 railway lines in nine states amounting to 5,518 km with a fleet of 278 trains. It wholly owns WestfalenBahn, having increased its share in July 2017 from the initial 25%.

Abellio Deutschland formerly also operated bus services through three companies, VM, Werner and KVG. It announced its intention to focus on rail transport in April 2013, and in November 2013, sold VM and Werner with 220 buses to Transport Capital. The remaining KVG business was sold to Rhenus Veniro and the District of Bautzen in October 2014 with 84 buses.

== Former operations ==
=== Czech Republic ===
Abellio bought Probo Bus in 2009 and ran its network in the Czech Republic. It consisted of regional bus transport in the Beroun District and surroundings and some long-distance bus lines between Prague and South and West Bohemia.

During July 2011, Abellio CZ was founded. In spring 2012, Abellio CZ lodged an extensive complaint about wrong assignment of the tender to running of fast train line Ostrava – Krnov – Olomouc; the complaint was completely rejected.

In November 2013, Abellio sold Abellio CZ and Probo Bus to Arriva with 110 buses.

=== Netherlands ===
Qbuzz was founded in 2008 by two former Connexxion directors; Abellio initially held a 49% shareholding in the venture. During April 2013, Abellio purchased the outstanding 51%, making Qbuzz a wholly owned subsidiary.

In March 2015, Qbuzz was awarded a 15-year concession to operate services in the province of Limburg from December 2016. However, after the discovery of irregularities during the tender process, the contract was awarded to Arriva.

In July 2016, NS announced its intention to sell Qbuzz. In July 2017, it was sold to Ferrovie dello Stato Italiane subsidiary Busitalia.

=== United Kingdom ===
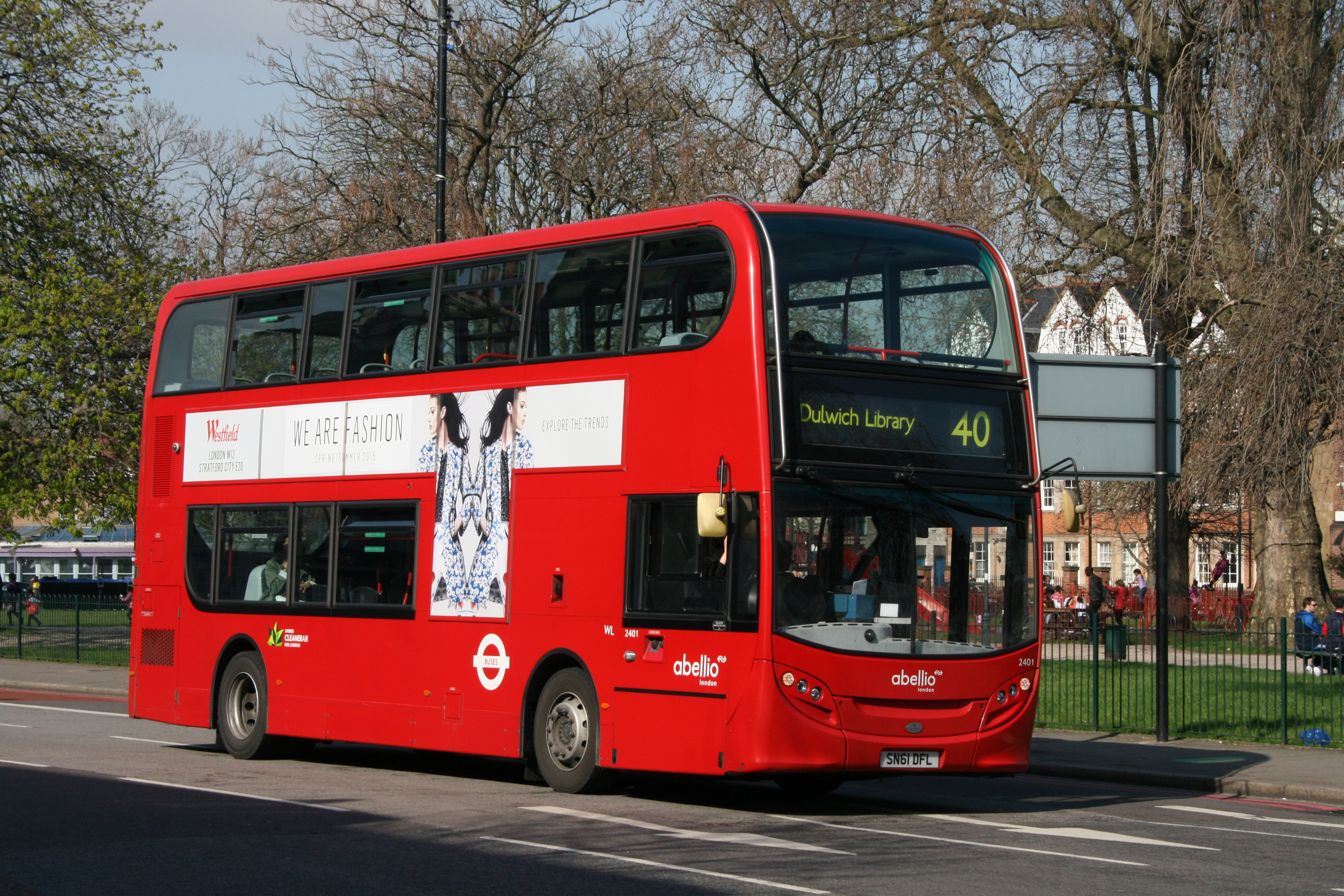
Abellio London Alexander Dennis Enviro400 in April 2015

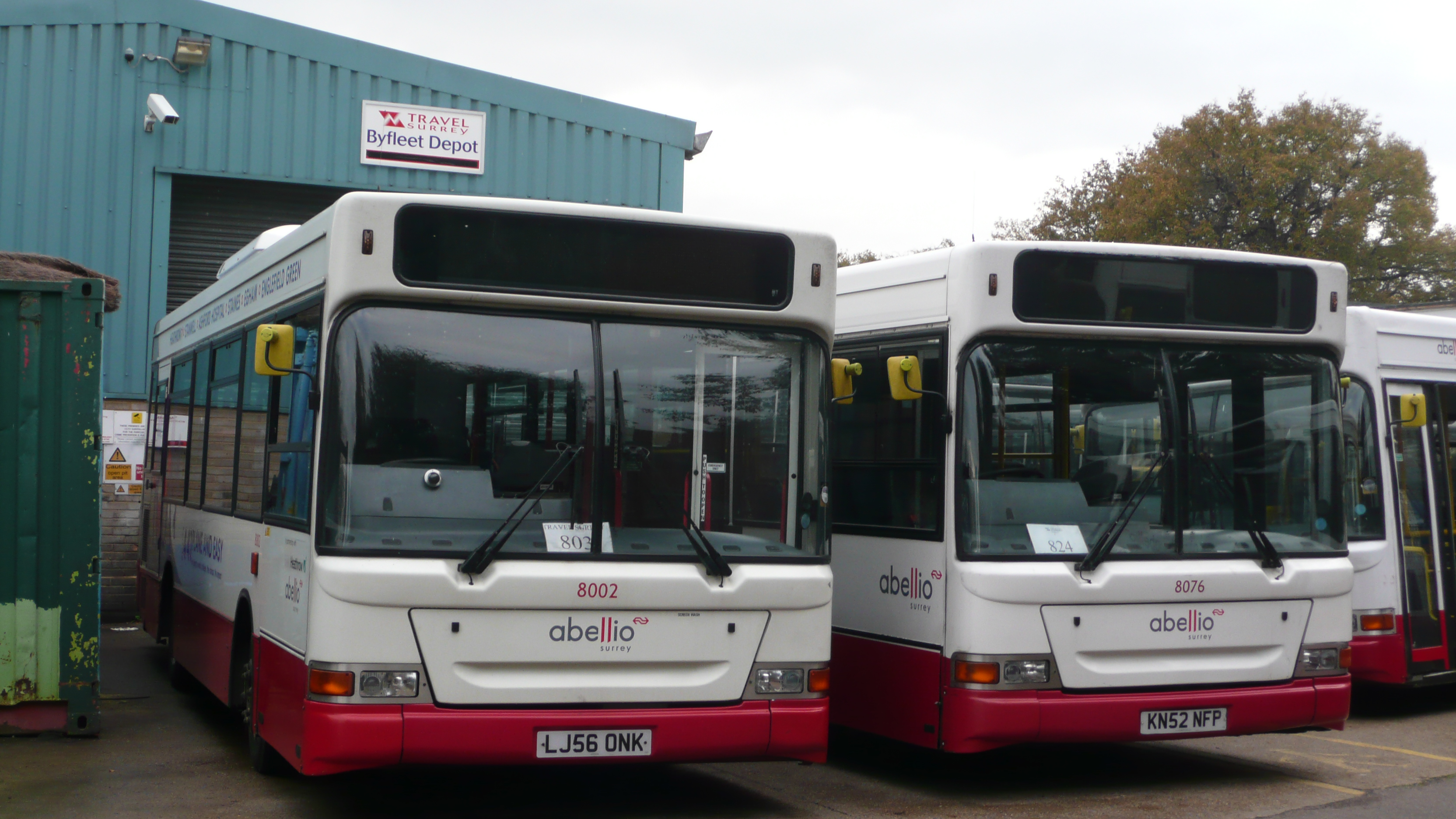
A pair of Abellio Surrey Dennis Darts in November 2009

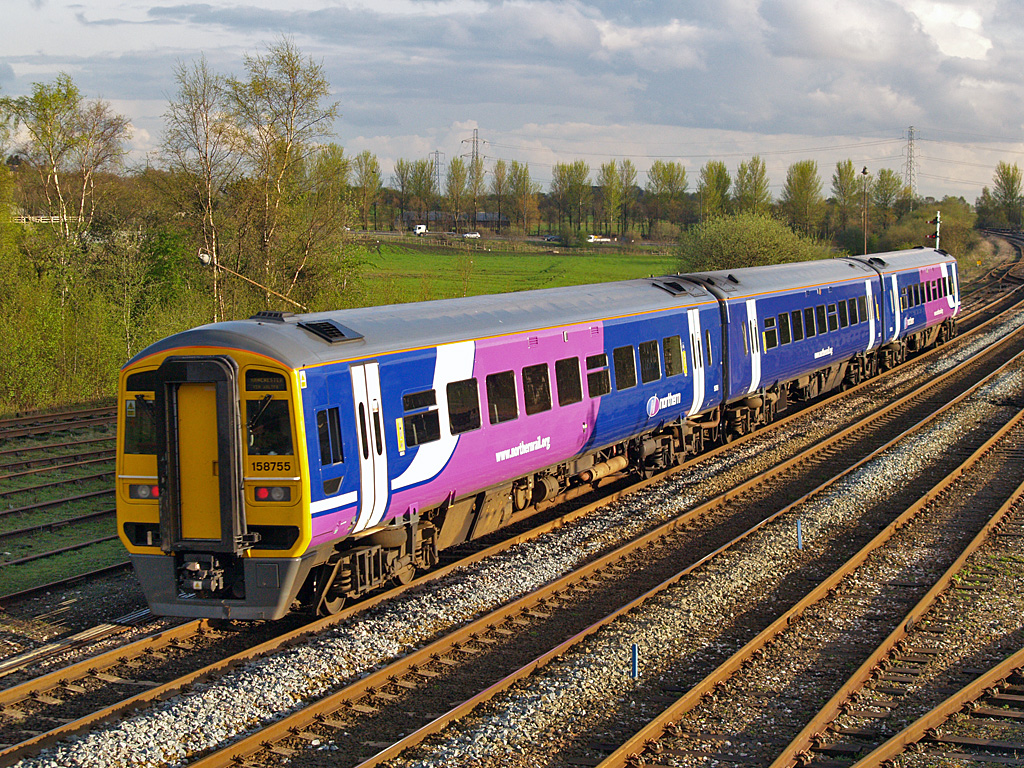
Northern Rail Class 158 in April 2008

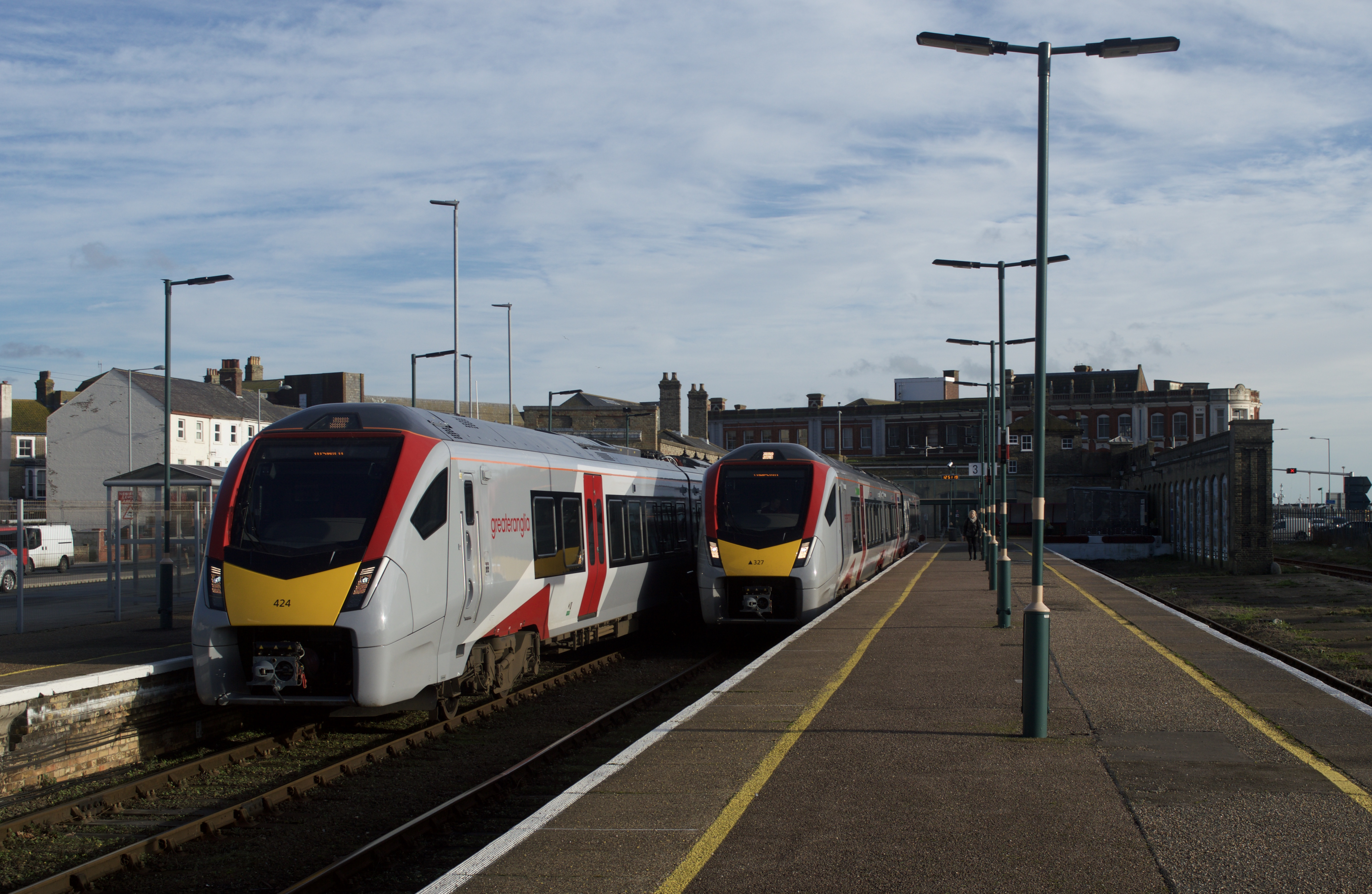
Greater Anglia Class 755s at Lowestoft in 2020

Abellio began operations in the United Kingdom in 2003, initially through a 50:50 joint venture with Serco and later operating various bus and rail operations in its own right.

In August 2022, Abellio agreed terms to sell its UK operations to the Transport UK Group, a management buyout led by managing director Dominic Booth, subject to approval by the Office of Rail and Road and partner organisations Merseytravel and Transport for London. The deal was completed in February 2023.

==== Buses ====
Abellio purchased the Travel London and Travel Surrey businesses from National Express during May 2009. Five months later, they were rebranded as Abellio London and Abellio Surrey. The latter closed in September 2018.

Abellio London operated six garages; Armstrong Way, Battersea, Beddington Cross, Dawley Road, Fulwell and Walworth. By March 2022, the fleet consisted of 756 buses.

==== Rail ====
Abellio has bid for a number of rail franchises initially through a 50:50 joint venture with Serco. Since July 2003, the joint venture has operated the Merseyrail concession; its 25-year contract expires in 2028, at which point it has been reported that the Liverpool City Region government intend to bring the network and its infrastructure under local public ownership. Serco and Abellio also operated the Northern Rail franchise between December 2004 and March 2016. Serco and Abellio also lodged unsuccessful bids for the Wales & Borders, West Midlands and Tyne & Wear Metro franchises.

Abellio also bid for a number of franchises in its own right, lodging bids for the South Western franchise (in partnership with FirstGroup), London Overground, South Central, InterCity West Coast, Essex Thameside, Thameslink, Southern & Great Northern and Northern franchises.

In February 2012, Abellio Greater Anglia commenced operating the East Anglia franchise. In 2016, Abellio successfully bid to retain the renamed East Anglia franchise until 2025. In January 2017, Abellio sold a 40% stake in the business to Mitsui. During 2021, following the COVID-19 emergency measures, Greater Anglia was given a direct award contract, replacing its franchise agreement, expiring on 20 September 2026.

In April 2015, Abellio ScotRail commenced operating the ScotRail franchise. In December 2019, Transport Scotland enacted a break clause to end the 10 year franchise agreement three years early, in 2022 rather than 2025. Ministers cited value for money and the need for financial sustainability as factors in the decision.

In December 2017, West Midlands Trains, a joint venture with East Japan Railway Company and Mitsui in which Abellio owned 70%, commenced operating the West Midlands franchise. During September 2021, following emergency measures to deal with the impact of the COVID-19 pandemic, the DfT awarded WMT a direct contract until 20 September 2026, replacing its existing franchise agreement.

In October 2016, it was announced that Abellio, along with several other competing companies, had been shortlisted to bid for the Wales & Borders franchise. This bid had been undertaken in partnership with Carillion. However, during February 2018, Abellio withdrew its bid for the franchise as the liquidation of Carillion left it without an infrastructure partner.

In August 2019, Abellio commenced operating the East Midlands Railway franchise. The company has reorganised the franchise's services into three branded segments: EMR InterCity for long-distance services from London St Pancras, EMR Regional for services across the East Midlands, and EMR Electrics for the outer suburban London St Pancras to Corby service.
