= Abellio Surrey =

Former bus company

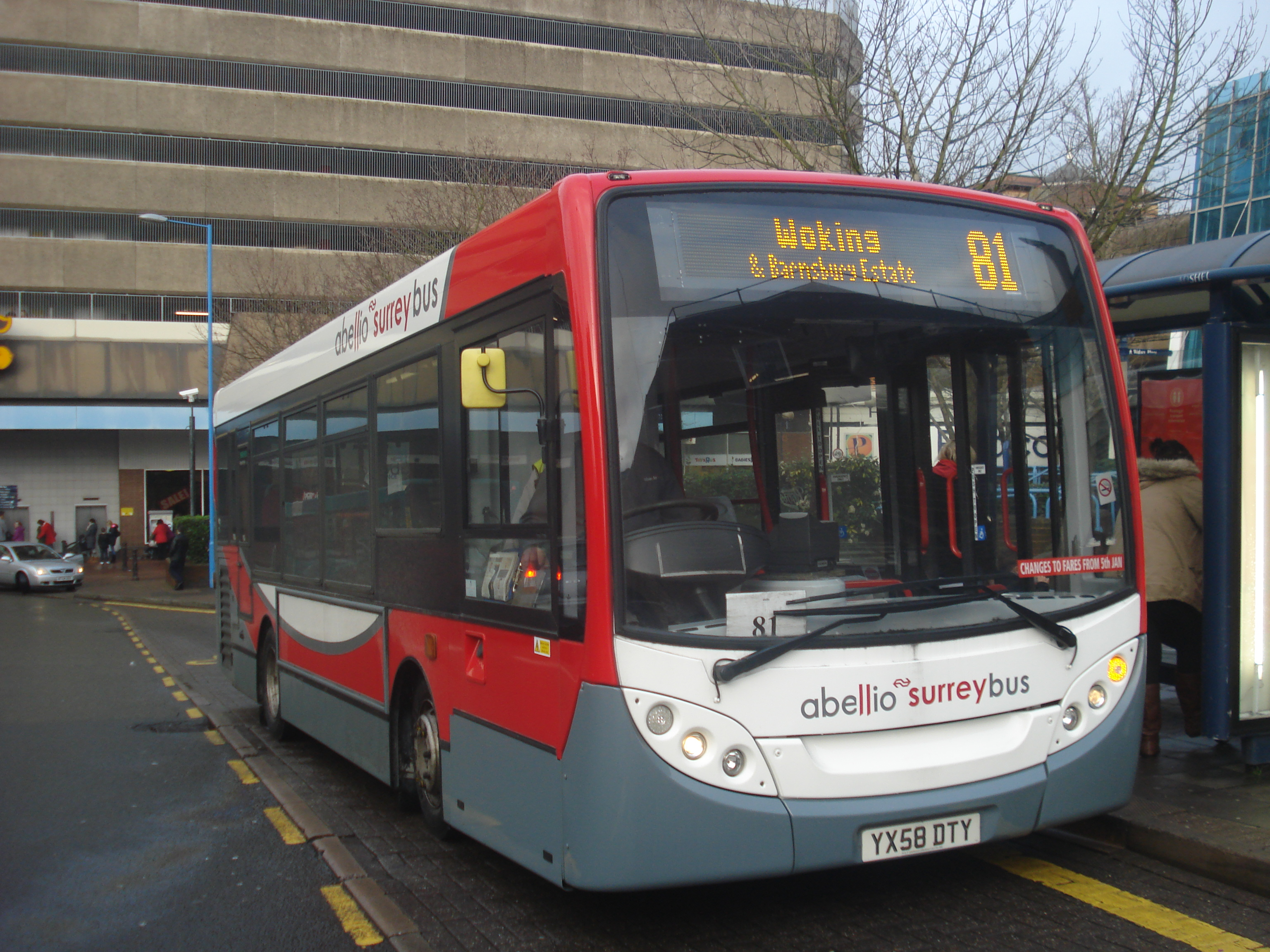
- Abellio Surrey Alexander Dennis Enviro200 in January 2014
- Parent: Abellio
- Founded: 21 May 2009
- Ceased operation: 14 September 2018
- Headquarters: Byfleet
- Service area: Surrey
- Service type: Bus services
- Routes: 34 (2013)
- Depots: 1
- Fleet: 63 (2013)
- Website: www.abellio.co.uk

Abellio Surrey was a bus company operating services in Surrey, England from 2009 to 2018. It was a subsidiary of Abellio.

== History ==
In 2005, National Express purchased the Tellings-Golden Miller operations in Surrey with a garage in Byfleet and various Surrey County Council contracts. The business was rebranded as Travel Surrey in September 2007.

On 21 May 2009, National Express sold Travel Surrey to Abellio. On 30 October 2009 the businesses was rebranded as Abellio Surrey.

As at February 2013, it operated 63 buses on 34 routes. In September 2017, all 17 Surrey County Council-tendered routes passed to other operators. Commercially operated route 441 was taken over by White Bus Services in March 2018, and route 461 by Falcon Buses in September 2018.
