= Tellings-Golden Miller =

Charter coach operator in England

- Headquarters: London
- Service area: Surrey and South East London
- Service type: Charter coaches and local bus services
- Depots: Byfleet
- Fleet: Range of charter coaches and service buses
- Chief executive: Richard Telling
- Website: www.tellingsgoldenmiller.co.uk

Tellings-Golden Miller is a charter coach operator in England. It was a subsidiary of Arriva twice previously, but once again has returned to family ownership. The company is now a subsidiary of Falcon Buses based in Byfleet.

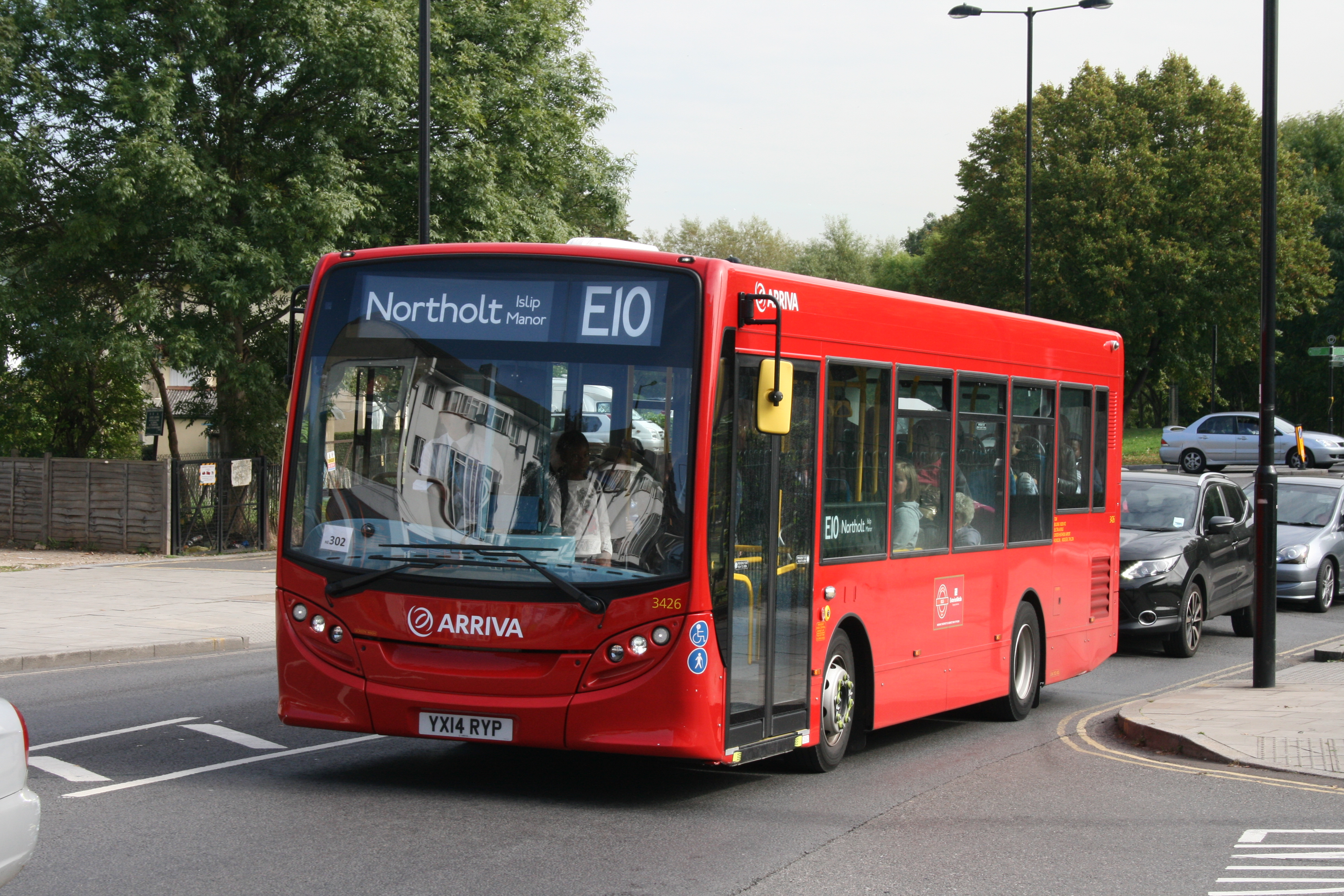
London buses route E10 at Greenford Broadway

== History ==
=== Golden Miller ===
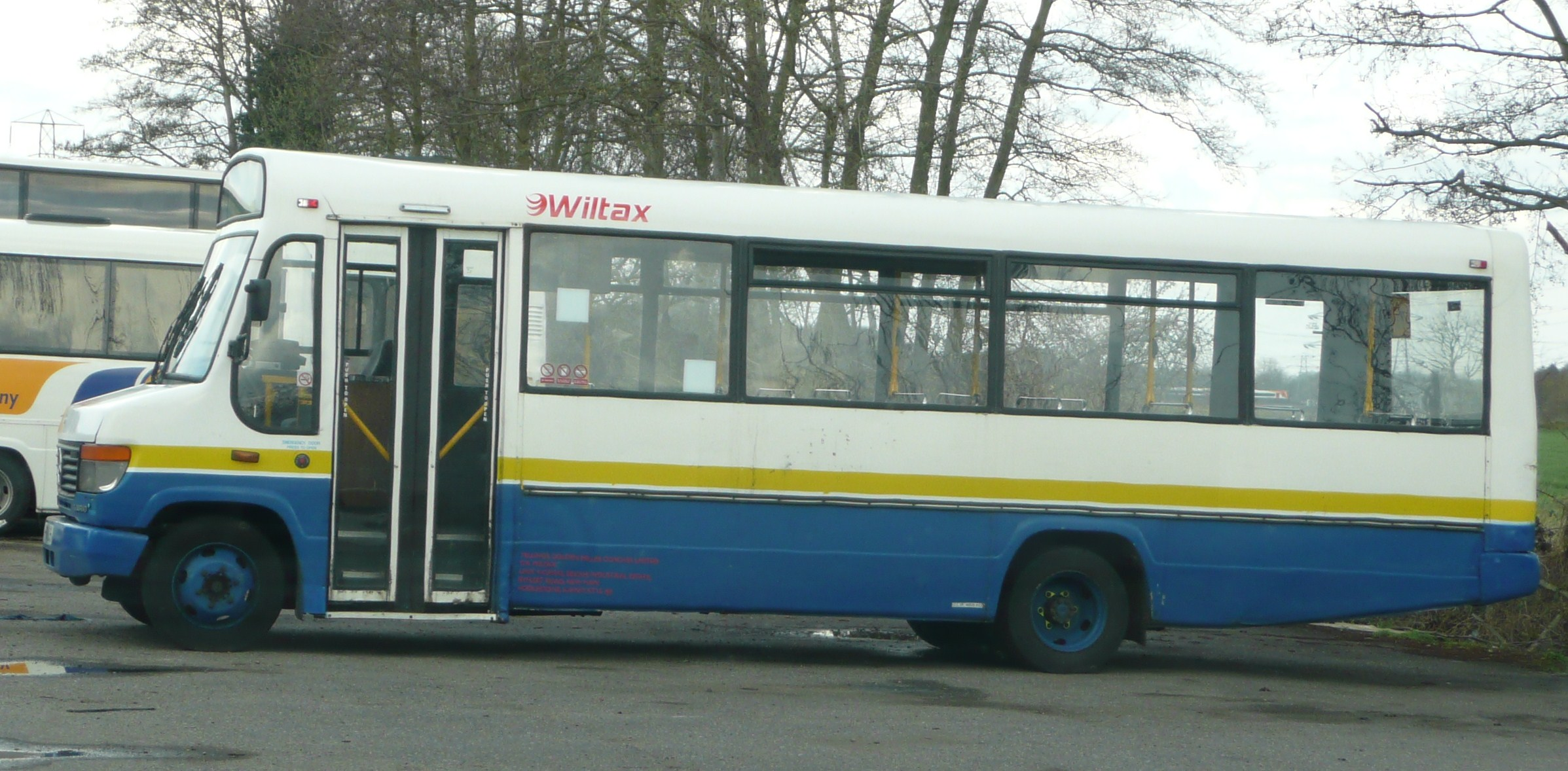
Wiltax's P701 LCF, a Mercedes-Benz Vario/Plaxton Beaver 2 parked at their depot. It was on loan from another Tellings-Golden Miller company at the time.

Reputedly, Fred Varney founded the Golden Miller company with the winnings from a bet made on the horse Golden Miller, which won the Cheltenham Gold Cup and the Grand National in 1934.

In 1955 Golden Miller was sold to FG Wilder & Sons Limited of Feltham with two coaches and a booking office in Twickenham. In 1967 Wilder bought out Tourist Bus Service which had one vehicle and a stage carriage licence for route 601 between Feltham station and East Bedfont, which it had operated since 1955. In 1968 routes 602 (Feltham to Shepperton) and 603 (Feltham to Hanworth via Elmwood Avenue) were added.

In 1970 the route from Walton-on-Thames to Walton-on-Thames station was taken over from Walton-on-Thames Motor Co Limited and extended to Oatlands village as route 604. Route 605 was planned for the Claygate area but did not come into effect, and route 606 began in 1971 from Staines to Stanwell Moor and Stanwell village.

=== Tellings-Golden Miller ===
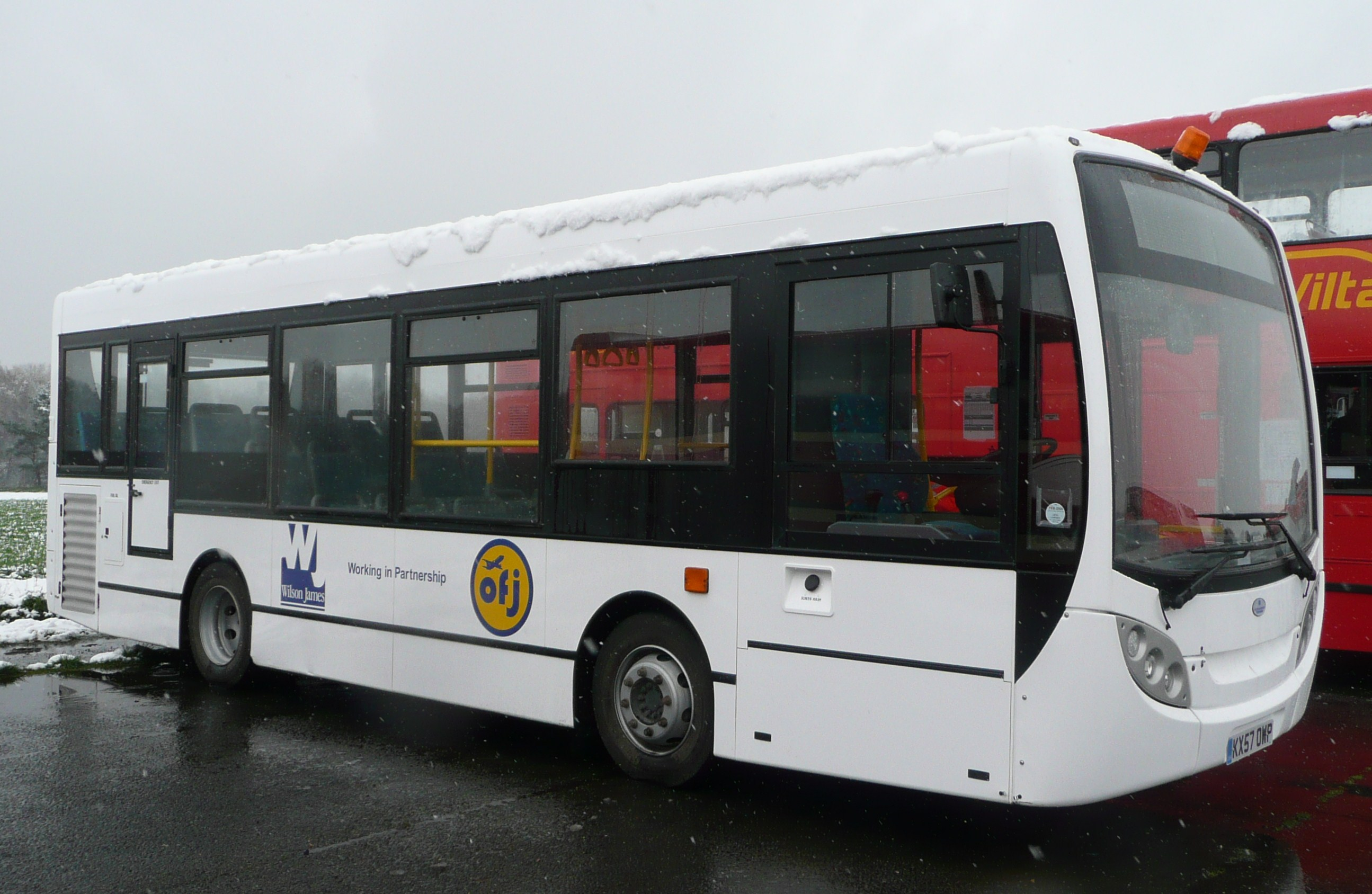
Alexander Dennis Enviro200 Dart in OFJ Connections livery in April 2008

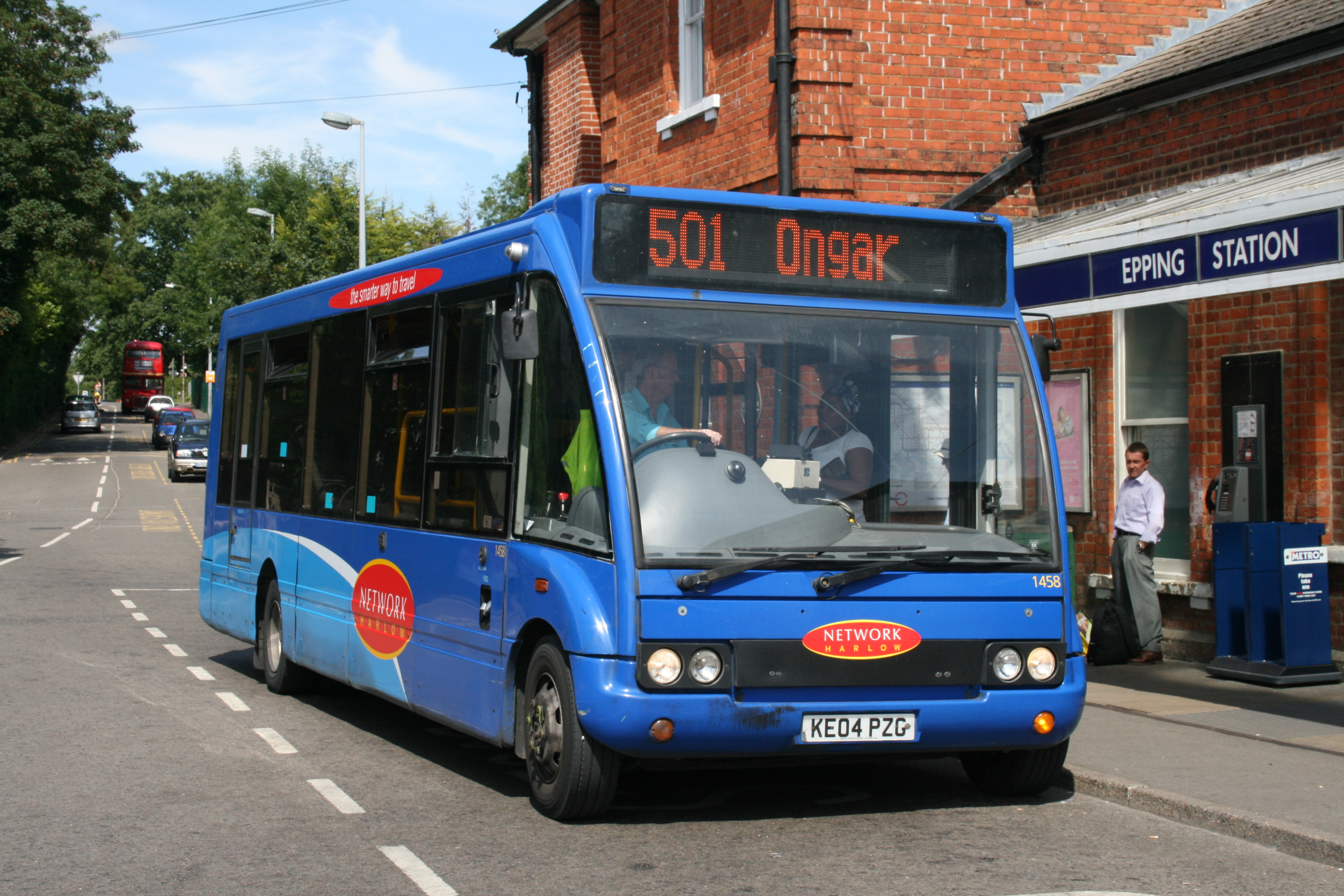
Optare Solo M880 in Network Harlow livery at Epping station in June 2014

In June 1985 Wilder sold Golden Miller to Tellings Coaches of Byfleet, a family-run concern which had been founded by Stephen Telling in 1972. Routes 601 and 603 were transferred to Fountain Coaches of Feltham from October 1985; these routes being combined as route 600 (East Bedfont to Hanworth via Feltham) in June 1986. The Golden Miller business continued to operate routes 602 and 606 until about 1988.

In 1989 the company was taken over by Midland Fox. A small number of London Transport contracted routes were won by the company over the following two years. However, by 1993 Midland Fox had itself been acquired by British Bus and was no longer willing to operate TGM. Stephen Telling re-acquired the company with financial support from Julian Peddle, and also took over Classic Coaches.

In 2003 the company was floated on the Alternative Investment Market. TGM operates coaches and maintains subsidiaries in Cambridgeshire, Essex, Suffolk, Surrey and the North East of England, and operates services under the Classic Coaches, Excel Passenger Logistics, Flight Delay Services, Link Line Coaches, and OFJ Connections brands.

The company previously ran bus services in South West London and north west Surrey, inheriting some through acquisition of Capital Logistics. These services were sold to National Express for £20.4 million (equivalent to £36,076,000 in 2025) in June 2005 and incorporated into its Travel London business. As part of the deal, Tellings Golden Miller became a National Express contractor, running several coach routes out of its Cambridge and Portsmouth garages.

In June 2007 Tellings-Golden Miller re-entered the Surrey bus business with the purchase of Wiltax, New Haw with 20 buses from Rotala. In December 2007 Tellings-Golden Miller was purchased by Arriva.

In April 2008, TGM acquired Excel Passenger Logistics based at Stansted Airport and its associated companies Excel Gatwick and Flight Delay Services based at Manchester Airport. In April 2008, the Wiltax operations were scaled back with most routes passing to other operators. Some routes continued to be run by Wiltax, but from Tellings-Golden Miller's Heathrow depot. In September 2008, Wiltax' New Haw depot closed, with all operations transferred to TGM's Heathrow depot.

In February 2010 the Haverhill operations of Burton's Coaches, together with the name, were sold to Yellow Star Travel Services. The National Express services had been earlier transferred to the Stansted depot of Excel Passenger Logistics. Burton's ceased operating in May 2011. In August 2010, TGM Group took over the Arriva Shires & Essex services from Harlow garage, with a Network Harlow identity for the local routes (similar to Network Colchester).

On 31 May 2014, Tellings-Golden Miller once again became a Transport for London contracted operator when it commenced operating route E10 from its Heathrow depot, the first route it has operated in London since the late 1990s. In January 2016, as part of a decision to consolidate all of Arriva's Transport for London routes, route E10 was transferred to Arriva London.

In March 2015, Network Colchester and Network Harlow operations were transferred to Arriva Southern Counties.

In December 2016, Tellings-Golden Miller once again became a family owned business, reverting to its own identity.
