= Mobico Group =

Transport company headquartered in Birmingham, England

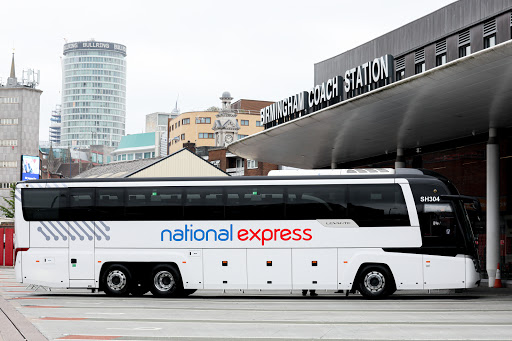
- National Express Coach at Birmingham Coach Station, the company’s headquarters
- Formerly: National Express Group plc
- Type: Public limited
- Traded as: LSE: MCG
- Industry: Transport
- Founded: 1972; 54 years ago
- Founder: National Bus Company
- Headquarters: Birmingham, England
- Area served: Europe; North America; Middle East; South Korea
- Key people: Helen Weir (Chairperson); Ignacio Garat (Group Chief Executive)
- Revenue: ▲£2,759.8 million (2025)
- Operating income: ▲£198.0 million (2025)
- Net income: ▲£(287.3) million (2025)
- Number of employees: 33,000 (2026)
- Subsidiaries: Clarkes of London; The Kings Ferry; Lucketts Travel; National Express Coaches; National Express Coventry; National Express Germany; National Express West Midlands
- Website: mobicogroup.com

Mobico Group, formerly National Express Group, is a British multinational public transport company with headquarters in Birmingham, England. Domestically it currently operates bus and coach services under brands including National Express. The company also operates transport services including trains abroad: in Ireland, Spain, Portugal, Malta, Germany, Bahrain, Morocco, Qatar, United Arab Emirates and South Korea, and long-distance coach services across Europe. It is listed on the London Stock Exchange.

== History ==
=== Early years ===
National Express logo, which was formerly also the brand and name used for the company itself

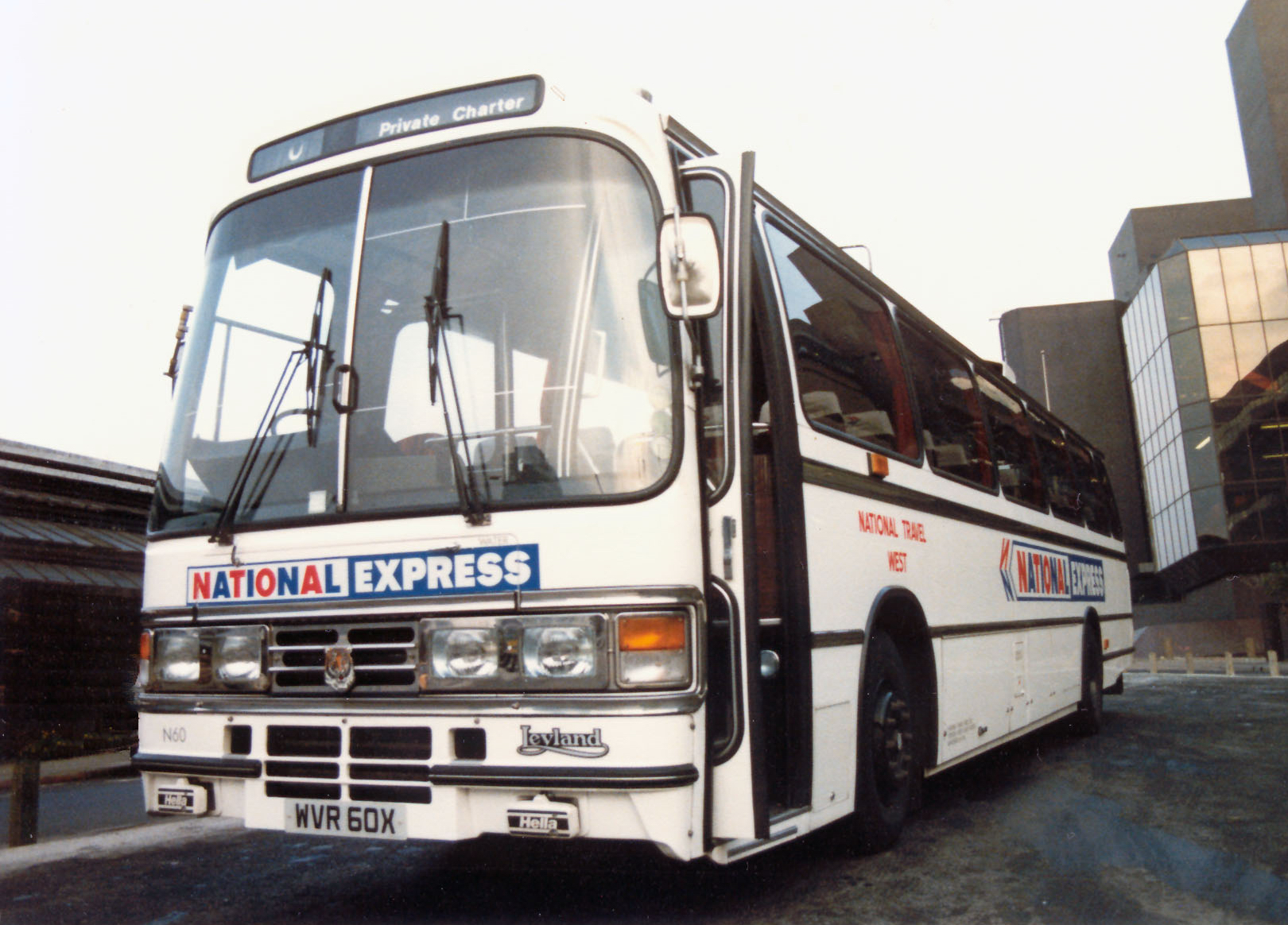
Duple Dominant bodied Leyland Tiger in Liverpool in 1982 in the original livery

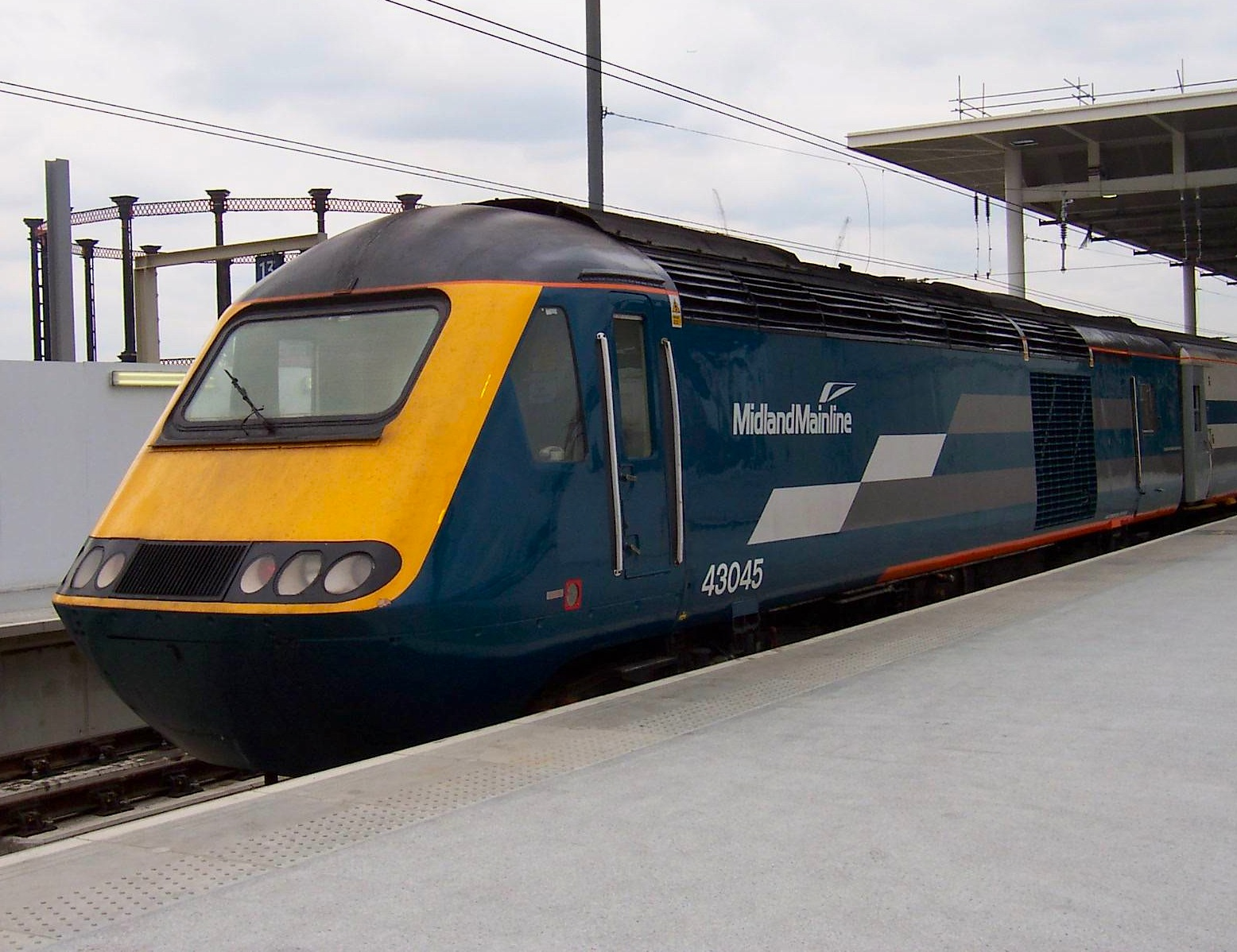
Midland Mainline High Speed Train at London St Pancras

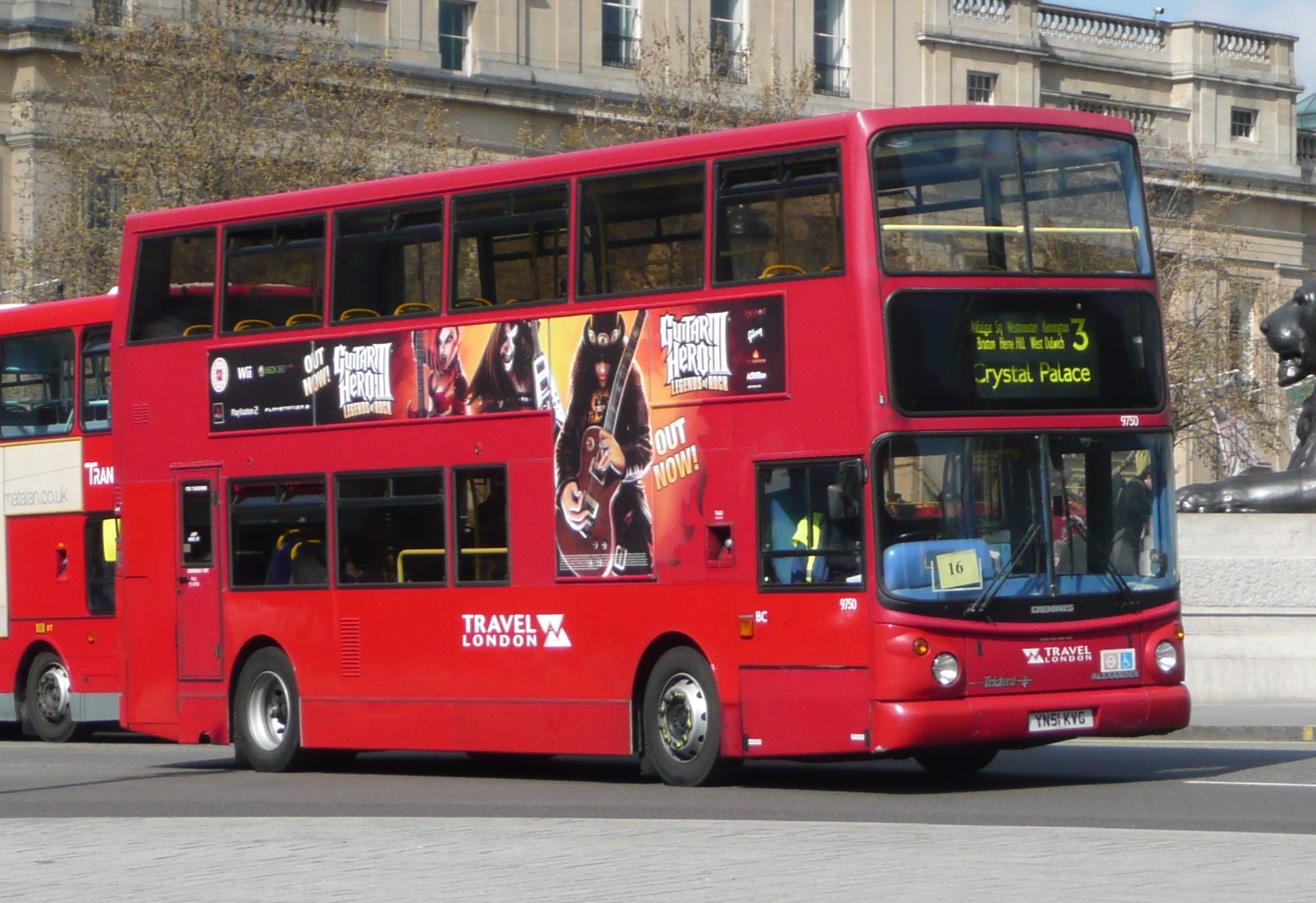
Travel London Alexander ALX400 bodied Dennis Trident 2 at Trafalgar Square in April 2008

In 1972, the state-owned National Bus Company decided to bring together the scheduled coach services operated by its bus operating companies in the United Kingdom under one brand. Sir Frederick Wood, a prominent businessman and industrialist, was asked to oversee the creation of this new business model and led the group as its chairman from 1972 to 1978. Initially branded as National, the National Express brand was first used in 1974.

With the privatisation of the National Bus Company in the 1980s, National Express was subject to a management buyout in March 1988. The management team pursued various means of diversification; during 1989, the company purchased Crosville Wales.

=== 1990s ===
Starting in early 1990s, National Express' financial performance began to deteriorate; this led to a new management team taking over the company in July 1991 which had the backing of ECI Partners, a mid-market private equity firm. The new team refocused the group on its core activities, leading to the sale of Crosville Wales to British Bus. During October 1991, it purchased Speedlink, an operator of coach services between Gatwick and Heathrow Airports. In December 1992, National Express Group plc was floated on the London Stock Exchange.

In 1993, Scottish Citylink, Eurolines and East Midlands Airport were acquired. During April 1995, National Express purchased West Midlands Travel, the formerly council-owned bus network of Birmingham and the West Midlands; it was rebranded Travel West Midlands in September 1996. This move began the brand family of Travel ... local bus operations. Bournemouth Airport was acquired in April 1995.

During April 1996, National Express commenced operating its first UK railway franchises, Gatwick Express and Midland Mainline. One year later, three other franchises were awarded, these being Silverlink, Central Trains and ScotRail. To comply with a Monopolies & Mergers Commission ruling on it winning the ScotRail franchise, National Express sold the Scottish Citylink operation to Metroline in August 1998.

In February 1997, Taybus Public Transport was acquired and rebranded Travel Dundee.

During September 1998, Crabtree-Harmon, the seventh-largest student transportation bus company in the United States was acquired, with 82 school bus contracts mainly in Missouri, but also in other Midwest states including Colorado, Iowa, Kansas, Oklahoma and Utah. During February 1999, Robinson Bus Service was purchased; it was followed in August 1999 by Durham Transportation. These acquisitions placed National Express as one of the top three United States school bus operators.

In May 1999, National Express purchased Australia's largest private bus operator, National Bus Company. National Bus Company had bus operations in Brisbane, Melbourne and Perth, and also held a 57% shareholding in Westbus, Sydney's largest bus operator. Westbus also had a London coach operation. In August 1999, National Express was awarded the M>Train, M>Tram and V/Line Passenger rail franchises in the Australian state of Victoria.

=== 2000s ===
During January 2000, National Express expanded into the American market by acquiring ATC, a public transportation operator. In July 2000, Prism Rail was purchased, though which the c2c, Wales & Borders, Wessex Trains and West Anglia Great Northern franchises were added to National Express' portfolio.

In December 2002, National Express handed in its rail franchises in Victoria, Australia, having been unable to renegotiate financial terms with the State Government.

During February 2004, the London bus operations of Connex were purchased and rebranded Travel London. In April 2004, National Express East Anglia commenced operating the Greater Anglia rail franchise. In September 2004, National Express sold its Melbourne bus operations to Ventura Bus Lines, and Brisbane and Perth bus operations to Connex. After being placed in administration in January 2005, Westbus was sold to ComfortDelGro Cabcharge in August 2005.

In June 2005, the London bus arm of Tellings-Golden Miller was purchased by National Express, after which it was rebranded as Travel London. During July 2005, National Express sold ATC to Connex. In October 2005, the company agreed to buy most of the operations of privately owned Spanish transport operator ALSA, which operates bus and coach services in Spain, Portugal and Morocco, and long-distance coach services to other parts of Europe. Alsa's operations in South America and China were retained by the previous owners.

In April 2007, National Express acquired Continental Auto, the second-largest bus and coach operator in Spain.

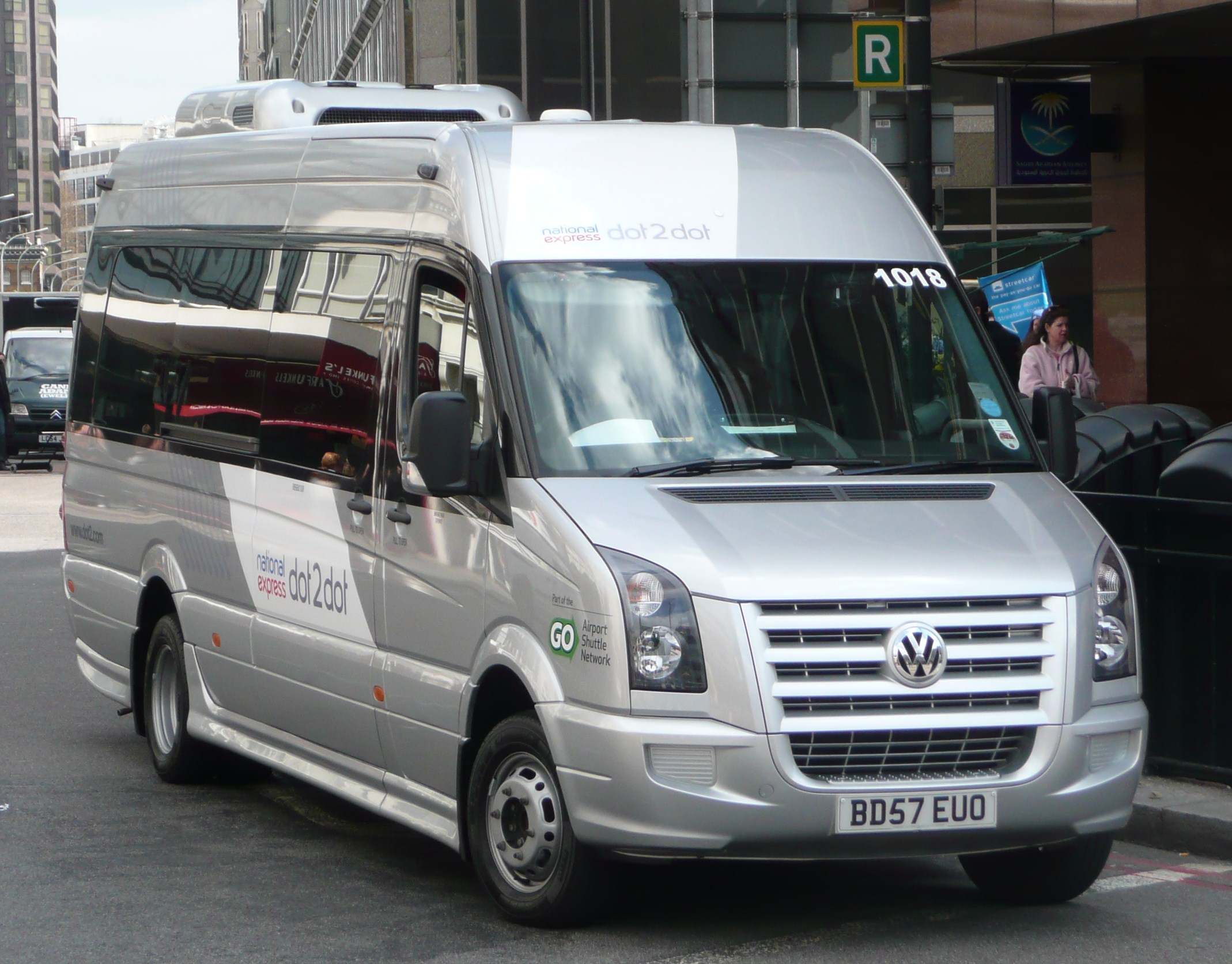
Dot2Dot Volkswagen in London in April 2008

During November 2007, South East England coach operator The Kings Ferry was purchased and an airport to hotel shuttle service in London branded Dot2Dot was launched. Dot2Dot did not prove to be commercially viable and thus ceased operations in November 2008.

In November 2007, National Express announced plans to re-brand all of their operations under a new unified National Express identity. It was intended to achieve greater recognition for all the group companies, to coincide with recent acquisitions and after current rail operations had improved in reliability to warrant association with the established express coach image. It coincided with the appointment of a group director for all UK operations and relocation of the head office from London to Birmingham, bringing all operations under a single strategic management structure. Day-to-day management remained within individual companies.

During February 2007, the Department for Transport announced that National Express, along with Arriva, First, and Virgin Rail Group, had been shortlisted to lodge bids for the InterCity East Coast franchise. In August 2007, the Department for Transport awarded the Intercity East Coast franchise to National Express, leading to the creation of National Express East Coast (NXEC) shortly thereafter. Under the terms of its franchise agreement, National Express committed to paying a £1.4-billion premium to the Department of Transport over a time span of seven years and four months. However, numerous rail analysts promptly voiced concerns that the company had paid too much for the franchise, and had effectively repeated GNER's mistake in order to secure the franchise. On 9 December 2007, National Express East Coast commenced operations, taking over from Great North Eastern Railway.

In May 2009, National Express sold Travel London and Travel Surrey to Abellio.

=== Operational safety concerns ===
On 3 January 2007, a speeding National Express coach overturned on the M4/M25 slip road, leaving three passengers dead. The driver was jailed for five years.

In July 2009, a junior transport minister, the Gillingham MP Paul Clark, listed a series of concerns to National Express in a letter following a meeting with an employee of National Express East Coast who lives in his constituency. The worker claimed that, due to reduced maintenance checks, some trains were in use with defective brakes, an allegation that was strongly denied by the company, which stated it would "never compromise on safety". He wrote: "As a result of reduced maintenance checks, 'some long-haul sets [trains] are in use with brake defects'. Increasing cuts in staff combined with an increasing pressure to ensure that trains run safely has resulted in fears among staff that a major accident is 'just around the corner'." Passengers, he added, "have been 'poisoned' as a result of coffee machines not being cleaned correctly, with cleaning fluids left in situ". The minister said he was "shocked and appalled at the information with which I've been provided. You will understand that these allegations are exceptionally serious".

School bus drivers in the US have raised concerns about the safety of the buses run by Durham, a subsidiary of National Express, and the second-largest operator of school bus services in North America. According to representatives of Durham bus drivers, fluid leaks, tyres that need to be replaced, black mould and non-functional emergency equipment are regular concerns, whilst workers continued to operate buses while sick because they cannot afford to miss a day of work and drivers are not paid for all the time they work.

=== Default on East Coast rail franchise ===
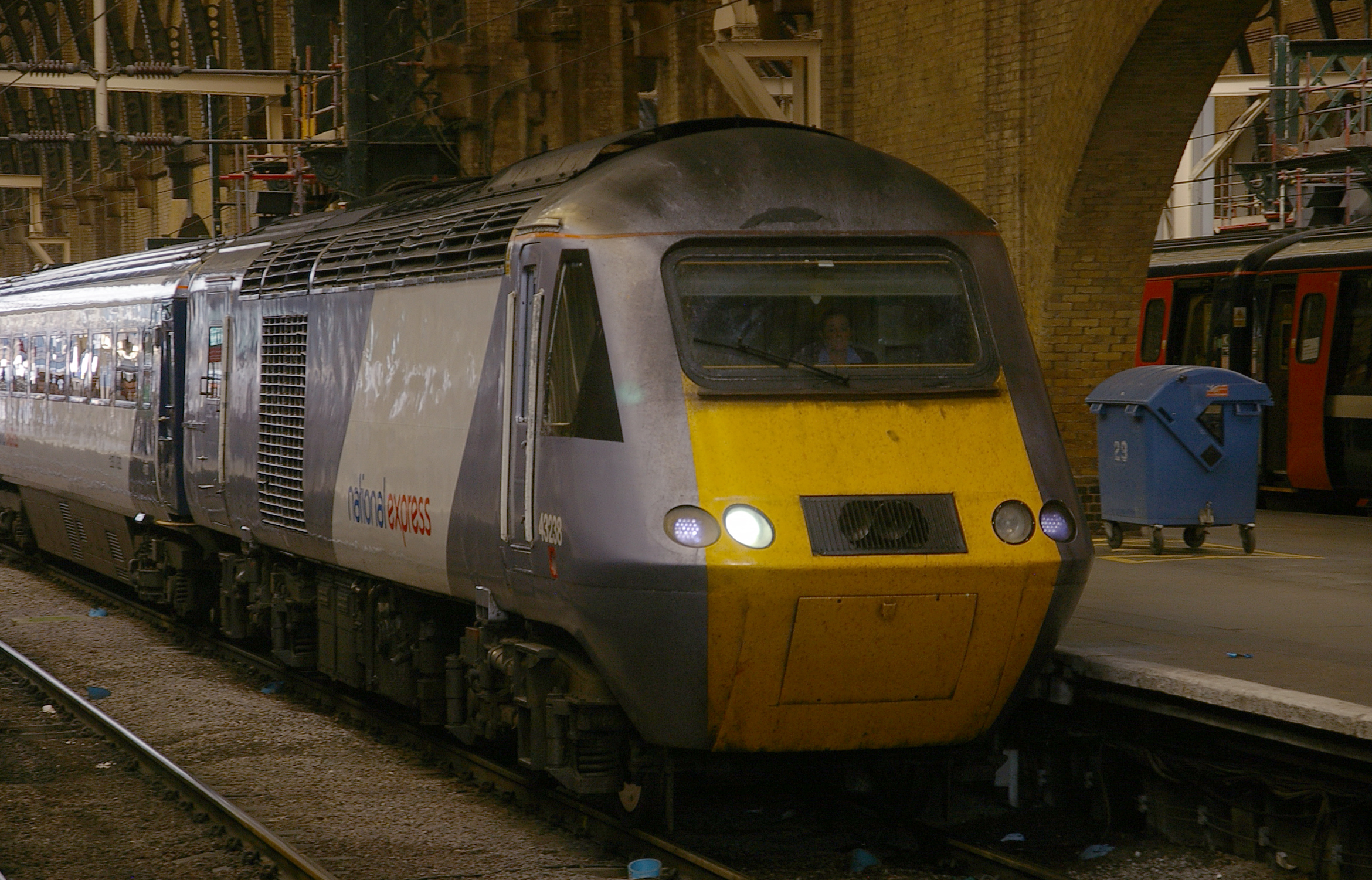
National Express East Coast High Speed Train at London King's Cross in July 2009

By 2009, National Express East Coast had come under increasing financial pressure due to various factors, including compounding rises in fuel prices and the poor economic climate of the time, commonly known as the Great Recession. In contrast to the company's projected revenue increases during its franchise, NXEC's actual operating income (generated primarily from ticket sales) had decreased by 1 percent during the first half of 2009. According to Rail, the franchise had quickly garnered a reputation for cost-cutting and a decline in service levels, particularly in terms of the onboard catering. It had also introduced various new charges, such as a £2.50 per journey leg for seat reservations.

During April 2009, National Express confirmed that the company was still pursuing talks with the government over possible financial assistance with the franchise, either through a reduction in the premium due or some other form of assistance. During these negotiations, the company had reportedly offered to pay over £100 million to be released from its commitment to operate the franchise. In July 2009, the Department for Transport announced that it would take the National Express East Coast franchise into public ownership at the end of the year after National Express announced it would not invest any further funds into the franchise, effectively declaring it planned to default. In defaulting on the franchise, National Express directly incurred losses of £72 million by forfeiting bonds. Directly Operated Railways took over the East Coast franchise on 14 November 2009.

The franchise failure sparked public and industry calls for the permanent public ownership of the InterCity East Coast franchise, or even the complete scrapping of the entire franchise system. In November 2009, the government announced that National Express East Anglia would not be granted a three-year extension that it had otherwise qualified for; this was reportedly a result of the East Coast default. However, National Express were subsequently granted an extension until October 2011, followed by another through to February 2012.

=== Prospective takeover ===
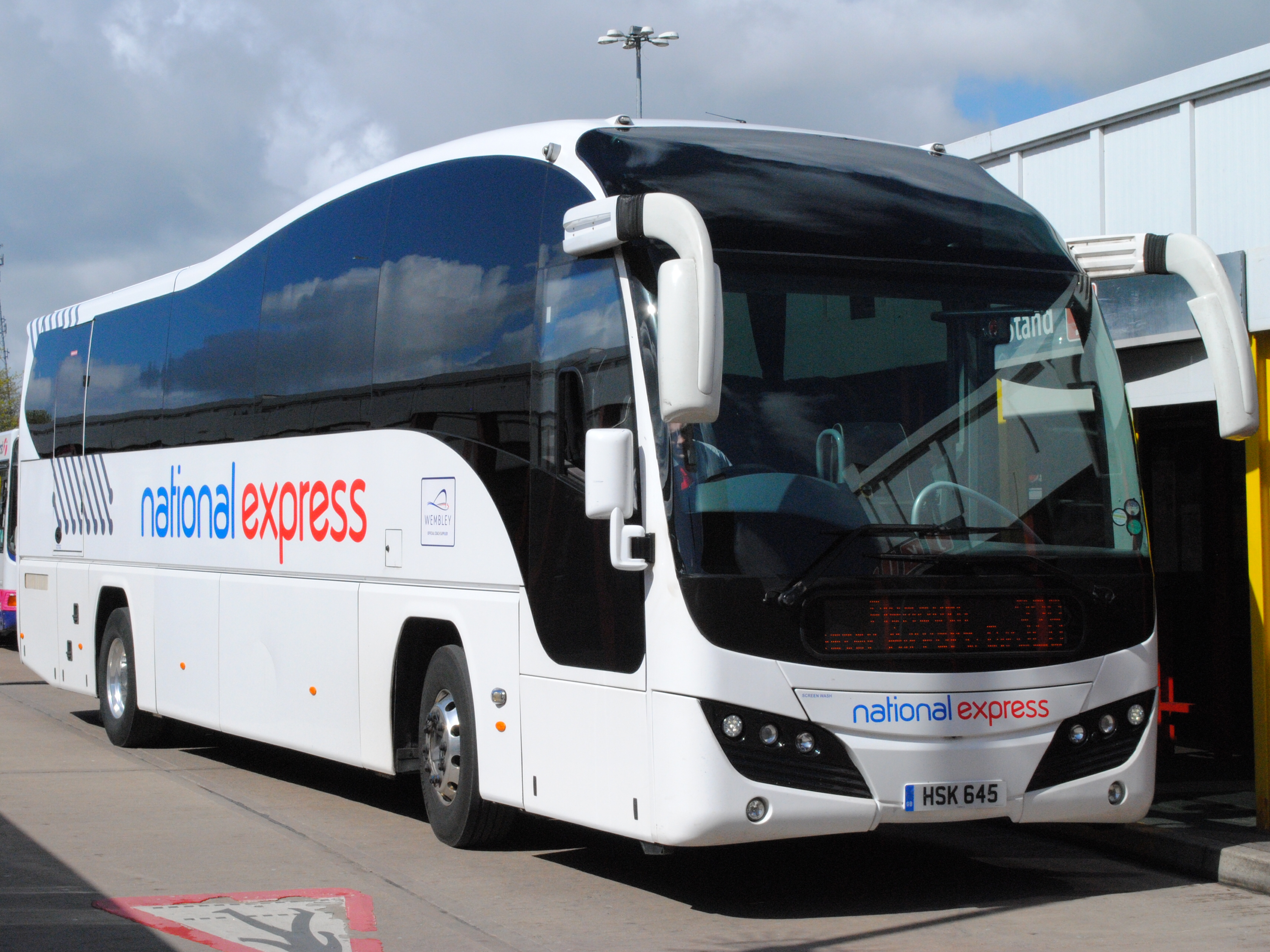
Park's of Hamilton Plaxton Elite bodied Volvo B9R in Bolton in April 2013

With the company's finances under stress largely as a result of having overbid for the National Express East Coast rail franchise, National Express became a takeover target in 2009. In June 2009, a takeover offer from fellow transport operator FirstGroup was rejected. On 3 September 2009, National Express' largest shareholder, Spain's Cosmen family with 18.5%, and CVC Capital Partners made a takeover offer of £765 million for the company. The Takeover Panel set a deadline of 11 September 2009 for all prospective bids.

During September 2009, National Express agreed to allow the Cosmen/CVC consortium to undertake due diligence. During the following month, the Cosmen/CVC consortium had reportedly reached an agreement to sell the UK bus and rail operations to rival transport operator Stagecoach Group if its offer was successful. The deadline for offers was subsequently extended to 16 October 2009.

On 16 October 2009, the Cosmen/CVC consortium announced that they had withdrawn their offer. That same day, Stagecoach submitted its own all-share bid to acquire National Express. This, too, did not proceed and, in November 2009, National Express announced it would raise the necessary capital through a share issue.

=== 2010s ===
During February 2013, National Express Germany was awarded two regional rail contracts by the Verkehrsverbund Rhein-Ruhr, Zweckverband Nahverkehr Rheinland and Zweckverband Nahverkehr Westfalen-Lippe authorities that commenced in December 2015.

In January 2015, the Bayerische Eisenbahngesellschaft announced that National Express had been selected to operate the Nuremberg S-Bahn system from December 2018. It was to have been the first Deutsche Bahn S-Bahn network to be taken over by a private operator. However, in October 2016, National Express elected to pull out, citing a delay in the ability to order new rolling stock while a challenge brought on by Deutsche Bahn was resolved, would make its bid unviable.

In June 2015, it was announced that the parts 2 and 3 of the Rhein-Ruhr-Express which will be introduced in 2018 will be operated by National Express. This includes Regional-Express services RE4, RE5 and RE6 in Northrhine-Westphalia.

In December 2016, coach operator Clarkes of London was purchased with 56 vehicles. In March 2020, Lucketts Travel was purchased.

=== Takeover attempt and rebranding ===
During September 2021, it was reported that National Express had entered into talks to acquire Stagecoach Group. In December 2021, a deal was agreed between the boards of the two companies: however, it was subject to both shareholder approval and regulatory scrutiny. Having originally recommended shareholders accept the National Express offer, in March 2022, the Stagecoach board of directors withdrew its recommendation in favour of a takeover offer from a DWS managed investment fund.

In January 2023, the coach excursion business of seven National Express Transport Solutions companies (Coliseum Coaches, Lucketts Travel, Mortons Travel, Solent Tours, Stewarts Tours, Woods Tours and Worthing Coaches) were brought together under the 'Touromo' brand. Touromo aimed to provide day trips and short breaks to destinations across the UK and Europe as one combined brand, and National Express planned to expand the brand outside the West Midlands and South East England to operate across the United Kingdom. Six months later, however, it was announced that Touromo was to cease operations and that National Express Transport Solutions was to cease offering day trips and holiday excursions in October 2023.

In June 2023, National Express changed its name to Mobico Group.

In April 2025, it was announced that chief executive Ignacio Garat would depart at the end of the month after nearly five years. Mobico chair Phil White, who served as CEO of National Express Group between 1997 and 2006, took over on an interim basis as the search for a successor gets underway.

In July 2025, Mobico sold its North American school bus operations to I Squared Capital.

In August 2026, it was announced Mobico would sell its UK Bus business, operating local bus services in the West Midlands (meaning both National Express West Midlands, and National Express Coventry), to the West Midlands Combined Authority. The deal is expected to close in November 2026, at a total cash value of £24million. Mobico describes the purpose of the deal, to make the company "simpler and stronger", however, it comes at the same time as the West Midlands Mayor Richard Parker, vows to bring local bus services into public ownership, through moving to a franchising model. The move to public ownership is expected to be completed by late 2029, with services being transferred to public operation in stages, across the county.

The company accepted a takeover offer worth £308 million from Autobuses de Leon (jointly owned by the Cosmen Family and a fund managed by Asterion Industrial Partners) in October 2026.

== Operations ==
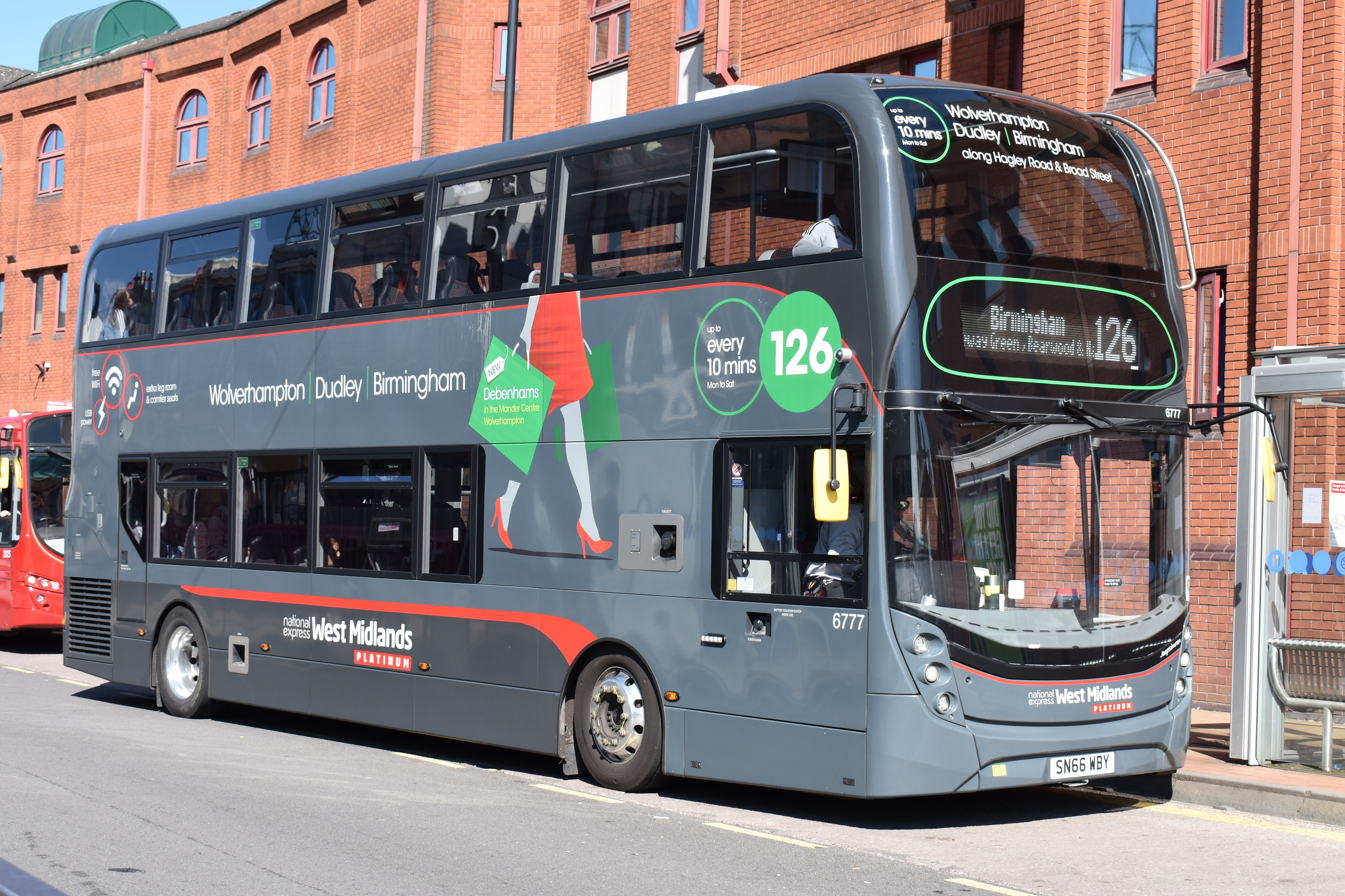
Alexander Dennis Enviro400 MMC bus in Birmingham, operated by National Express West Midlands

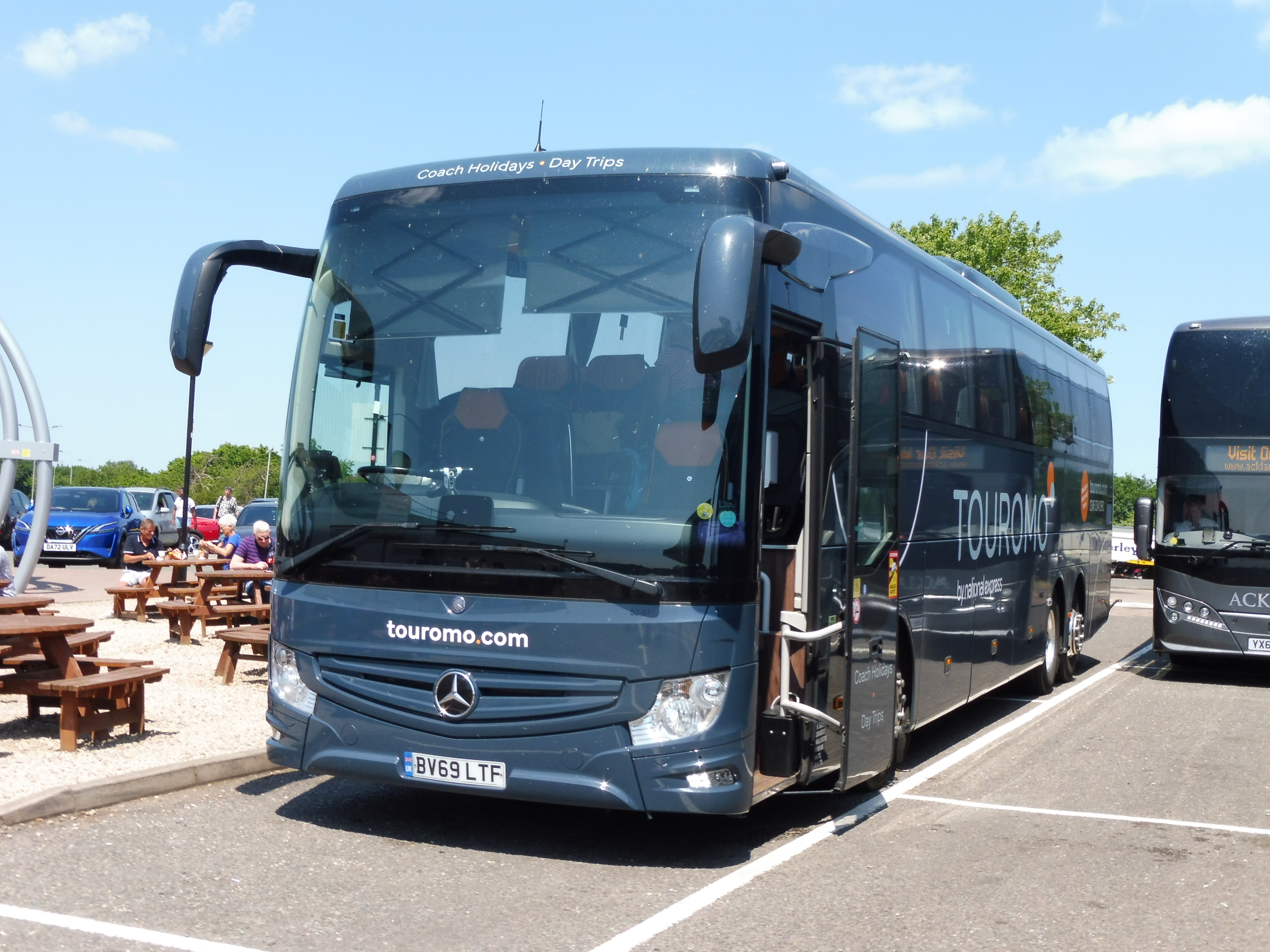
Touromo Mercedes-Benz Tourismo operated by Lucketts Coaches in June 2023

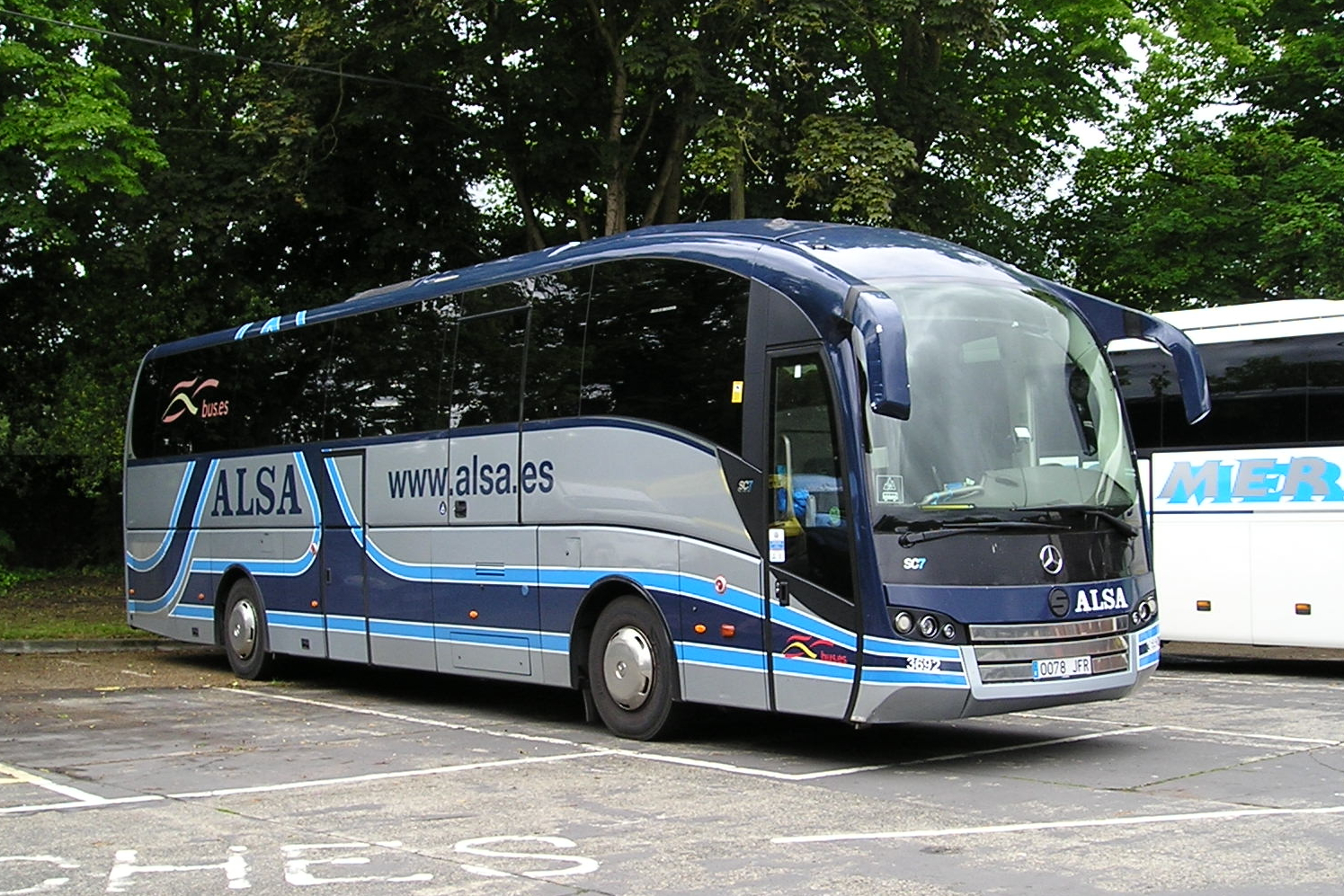
ALSA Sunsundegui coach in Spain

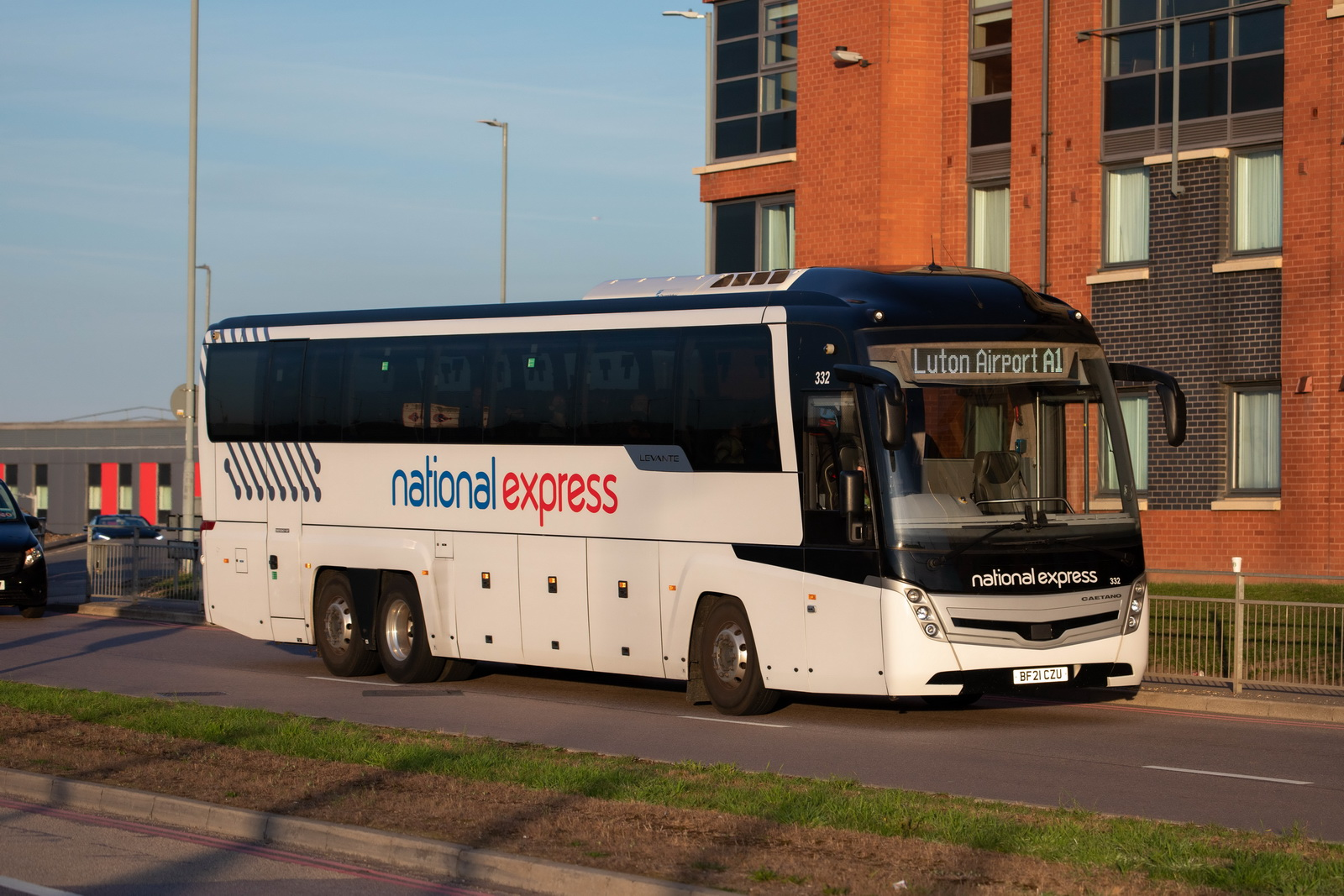
A National Express Caetano Levante coach at Luton Airport in September 2022

National Express' operations are summarised below:

=== Europe ===
==== Bus and coach ====
The bus and coach services operated by the group are:

===== Bus =====
- AirLinks (contract bus operation at UK airports)
- National Express West Midlands (Major bus operations in Birmingham and the rest of the West Midlands)
  - National Express Coventry (bus operation in and around Coventry, a subsidiary of National Express West Midlands)

===== Coach =====
- National Express Coaches (long-distance express and airport coach services in the UK)
- National Express Transport Solutions
  - Lucketts Travel (private coach hire)
  - The Kings Ferry (private coach hire)
  - Clarkes of London (private coach hire)
  - Woods Coaches (private coach hire and tours)
  - Worthing Coaches (private coach hire and tours)
  - Coliseum Coaches (private coach hire and tours)
  - Solent Coaches (private coach hire and tours)
- ALSA including Continental-Auto (coach services in Spain and Western Europe)
- Dublin Express (Dublin and Belfast services to Dublin Airport)
- In 2016, National Express coach tickets are distributed through Europe by the online booking platform SoBus.

In July 2023, National Express announced they would be ceasing the operation of coach tours having only launched the Touromo brand of coach tours in January the same year.

==== Railway ====
National Express Germany operates a number of train services in the German state of North Rhine-Westphalia.

- Wupper-Express (RE 4), from December 2020
- Rhein-Express (RE/RRX 5), from June 2019
- Westfalen-Express (RE/RRX 6), from December 2019
- Rhein-Münsterland-Express (RE 7), from December 2015
- Rhein-Wupper-Bahn (RB 48), from December 2015

Following the financial difficulties of Abellio GmbH, National Express was awarded an emergency contract to operate further services in North Rhine-Westphalia from February 2022 to run for two years.

- NRW-Express (RE/RRX 1) Aachen-Hamm
- Rhein-Hellweg-Express (RE11) Düsseldorf-Kassel.

ALSA Rail operates freight trains and heritage railways in Spain.

=== USA and Canada ===
==== Bus ====
- National Express Transit (transit and paratransit bus operation in the US, formed in 2012)
  - JATRAN
  - Kern Transit
  - Manteca Transit
  - Merced County Transit
  - Victor Valley Transit Authority
  - Westmoreland County Transit Authority
- A&S Transportation (school bus operations in Florida)
- A1A Transportation (school bus operations in Florida)
- Aristocrat Limousine and Bus (limo and charter bus service in New Jersey)
- Cook DuPage Transportation (paratransit service in Chicago area)
- Diamond Transportation (paratransit and shuttle service in Washington, DC area, acquired 2016)
- Monroe School Transportation (school and charter bus operations in Rochester, New York)
- New Dawn Transit (school bus operations in New York City)
- Petermann Transportation (school bus and special service bus operation in US, acquired 2011)
- Quality Bus Service (school bus operations in Orange County, New York)
- Queen City Transportation (school and charter bus operations in Ohio, acquired 2017)
- Suburban Paratransit (paratransit service in New York)
- Total Transit (transit and paratransit service in Arizona)
- Trans Express (shuttle, charter, tour, and casino service in New York, acquired 2015)
- Trinity Transportation (charter and school service in Michigan, acquired 2017)
- White Plains Bus (charter service in New York)
- In July 2014, National Express partners with Canadian-based online booking platform Busbud.

=== Middle East ===
==== Bus ====
In February 2015, the Bahrain Public Transport Company in which National Express holds a 50% shareholding commenced operating a 10-year concession in Bahrain.

== Former operations ==
=== Europe ===
==== Bus and coach ====
===== Bus =====
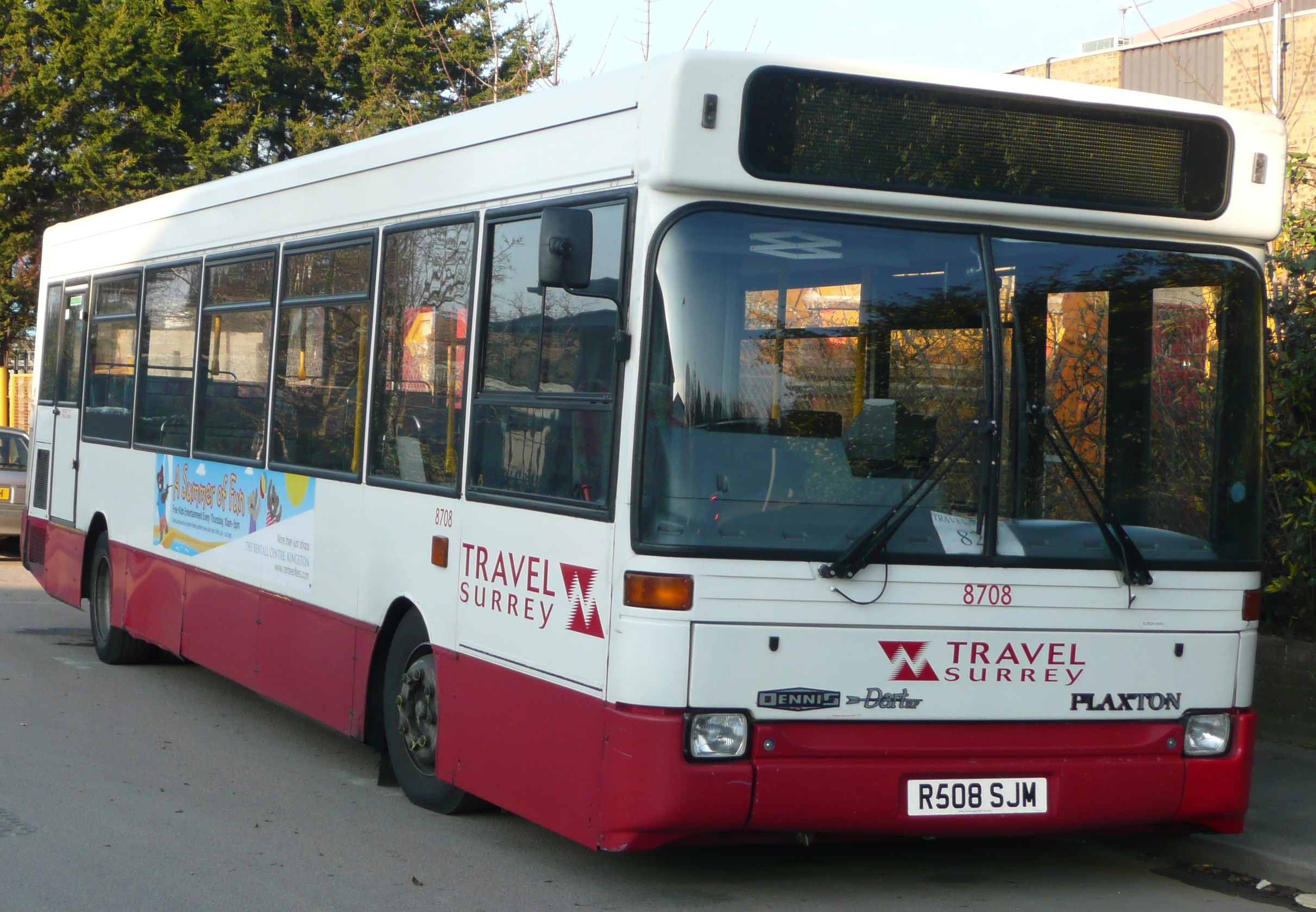
Travel Surrey Plaxton Pointer bodied Dennis Dart in Byfleet in December 2008

In May 2009, National Express sold some of its bus operations to Abellio:

- Travel London (bus operation under contract to Transport for London in London)
- Travel Surrey (bus operation Surrey and South West London – a subsidiary of Travel London)

In December 2020, National Express sold its Xplore Dundee business to McGill's Bus Services.

===== Coach =====
- Scottish Citylink sold to Metroline in August 1998 in order to comply with a Competition Commission requirement for National Express to operate the ScotRail rail franchise
- City2City an express coach services in Germany that ceased on 14 October 2014.
- Stewarts Coaches (private coach hire and tours), previously part of National Express Transport Solutions, sold to the Coach Travel Group in December 2024.

==== Railway and tram ====
===== Railway =====
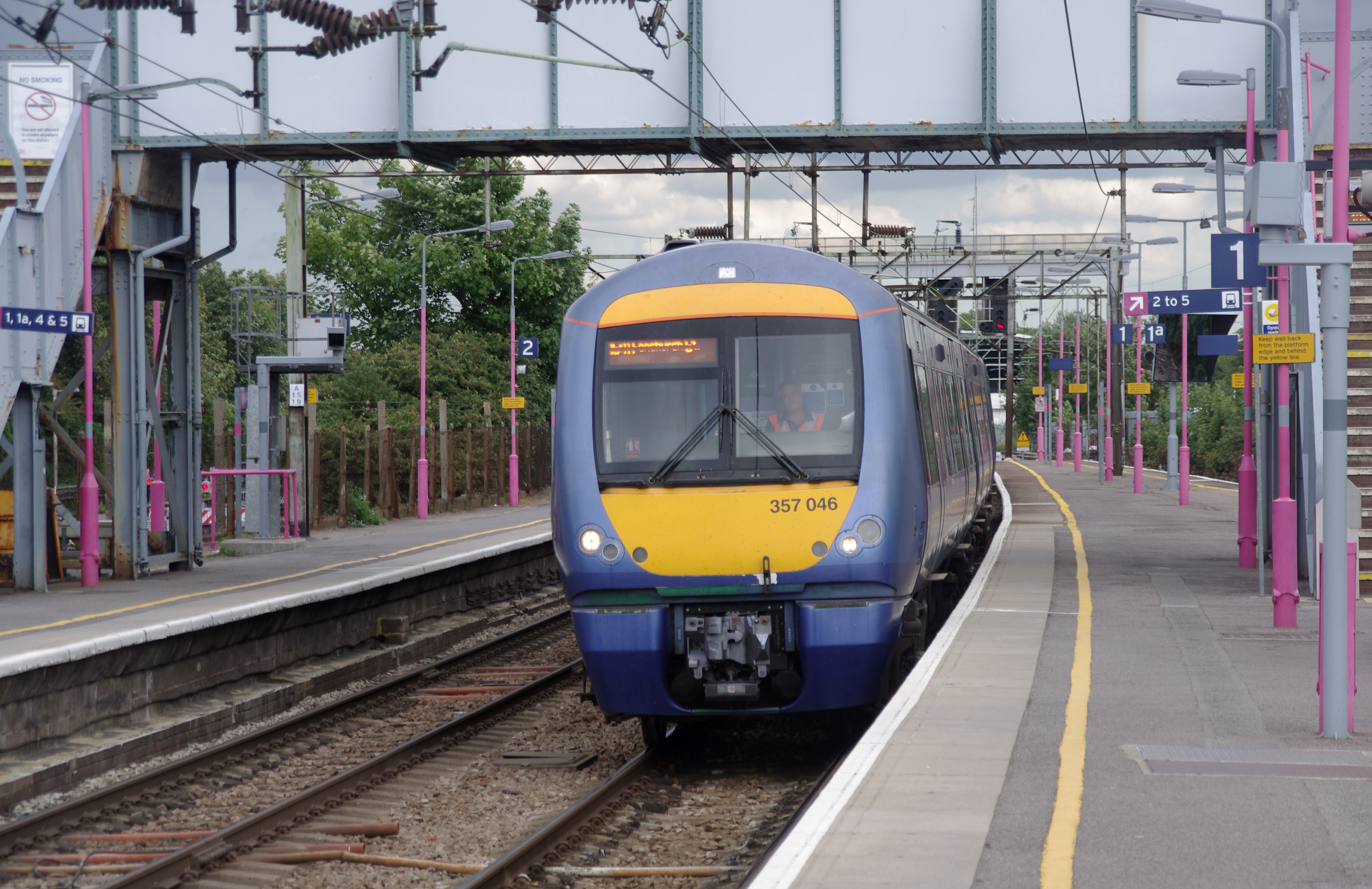
c2c Class 357 at Upminster in September 2010

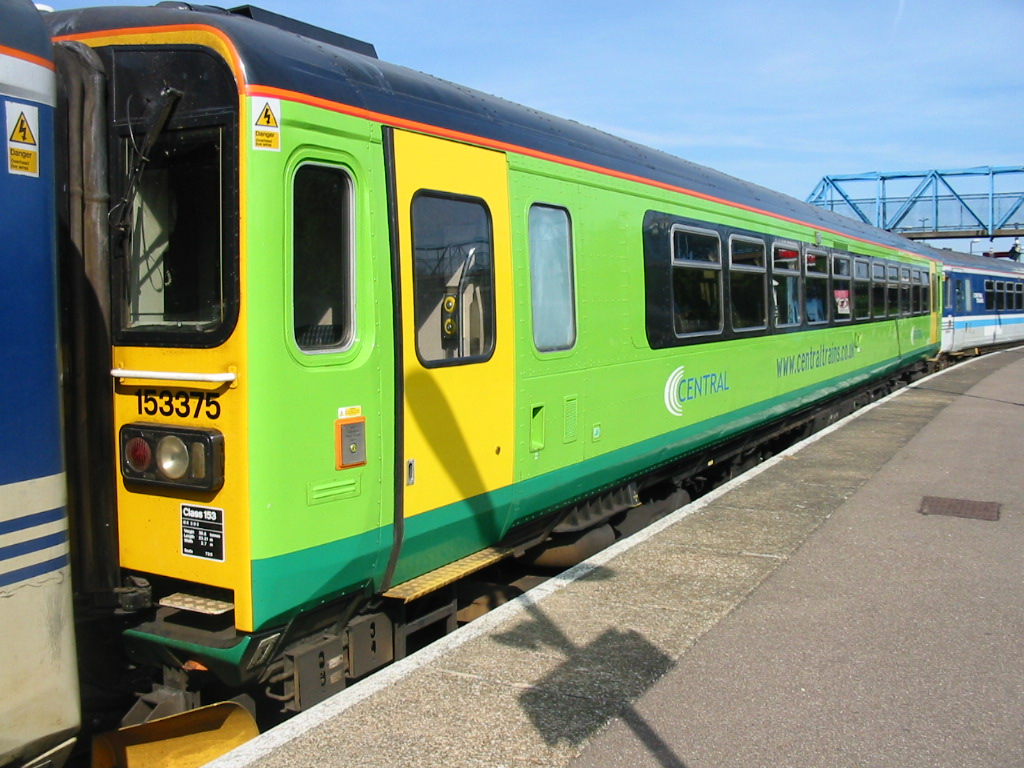
Central Trains Class 153 at Lincoln in May 2004

Rail franchises formerly operated:

- Wales & Borders passed to Arriva Trains Wales in December 2003
- ScotRail passed to First ScotRail in October 2004
- Wessex Trains, absorbed into Greater Western franchise and passed to First Great Western in April 2006
- West Anglia Great Northern split into two parts: West Anglia services transferred to National Express East Anglia April 2004, Great Northern services passed to First Capital Connect in April 2006
- In November 2007 several franchises were lost in a general restructure:
  - Central Trains split between CrossCountry, East Midlands Trains and London Midland
  - Midland Mainline absorbed into East Midlands Trains franchise
  - Silverlink split between London Midland and London Overground
- Gatwick Express incorporated into Southern franchise in June 2008
- National Express East Coast passed to Directly Operated Railways in November 2009
- National Express East Anglia (including Stansted Express service) passed to Greater Anglia in February 2012
- c2c operated from May 1996 until sold to Trenitalia in February 2017

===== Tram =====
- National Express Midland Metro (now West Midlands Metro tram line), passed to Transport for West Midlands in 2018.

===== London & Continental Railways =====
National Express had a 17.5% shareholding in London & Continental Railways (L&CR) from its formation in September 1994 until it was nationalised by the Government of the United Kingdom in 2009. L&CR was responsible for building the High Speed 1 project. National Express also held a 40% stake in the Inter-Capital and Regional Rail consortium which held the management contract for the UK arm of the Eurostar operation, L&CR's subsidiary Eurostar International from 1998 to 2010.

=== Airports ===
In the 1990s, National Express moved into the privatisation of airports, purchasing East Midlands, Bournemouth, and Humberside Airports. In a move to concentrate on bus and rail provision, Humberside was sold to Manchester Airports Group in 1999 followed by Bournemouth and East Midlands in February 2001.

Until November 2007, the group also operated Stewart International Airport in New Windsor, New York. However, the lease was sold to the public Port Authority of New York and New Jersey.

=== Australian operations ===
==== Bus and coach ====
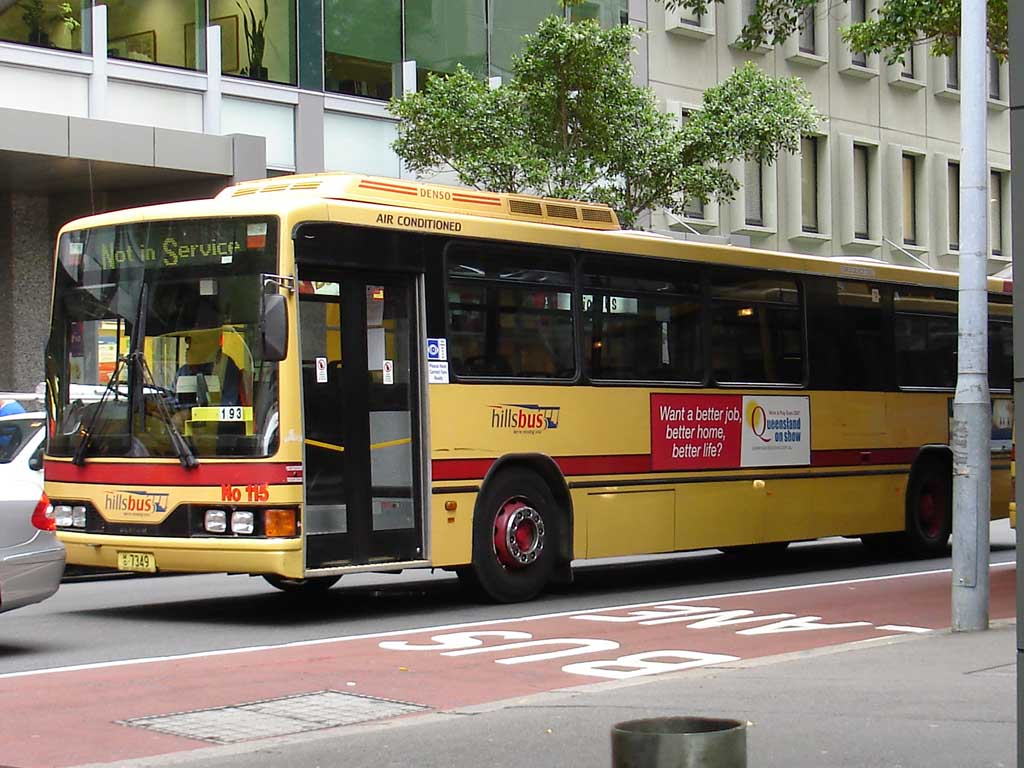
Westbus Custom Coaches bodied Mercedes-Benz O405 in Sydney

Australian bus companies previously operated:

- Westbus and Hillsbus in Sydney, sold to ComfortDelGro Cabcharge in 2005, Westbus ceased operating in 2013, Hillsbus rebranded CDC NSW in 2023.
- Blue Ribbon in the Hunter Valley, sold to ComfortDelgro Cabcharge and rebranded Hunter Valley Buses in 2005.
- National Bus Company, Melbourne, sold to Ventura Bus Lines in 2004, ceased operating in 2013.
- National Bus Company, Brisbane, sold to Connex in 2004, now operating as Transdev Queensland.
- Southern Coast Transit, Perth, sold to Connex in 2004, now operating as Transdev WA.

==== Railway and tram ====
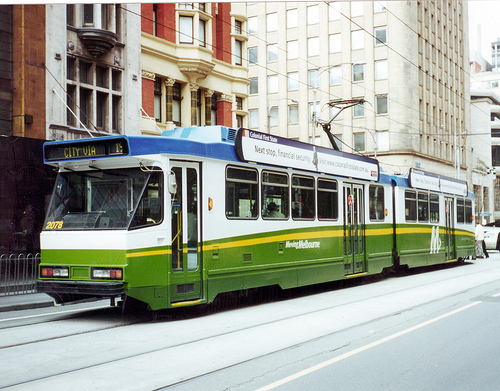
M>Tram B-class tram in Melbourne in August 2001

In 1999, the Group gained the Australian franchises M>Train, M>Tram and V/Line Passenger, following the privatisation of rail and tram services by the Government of Victoria. After incurring large losses and being unable to renegotiate the franchise contracts, the operations were handed back to the State Government. M>Train was re-let to Connex and M>Tram to Transdev. V/Line became a government-owned corporation.

=== USA and Canada ===
==== Bus and coach ====
- ATC (transit and paratransit operations in the United States and Canada, sold to Veolia Environnement in 2005 and since renamed Veolia Transport).
- Yuma County Area Transit
- Arlington Transit (transit and paratransit operations in the United States from 2009 to 2019, transferred to First Transit in 2019)
- SolTrans
- Durham School Services (school bus operation in the US)
- Stock Transportation (school bus operation in Canada)
