= Greenwood station (Mississippi) =

Train station in Greenwood, Mississippi, US

Greenwood, MS
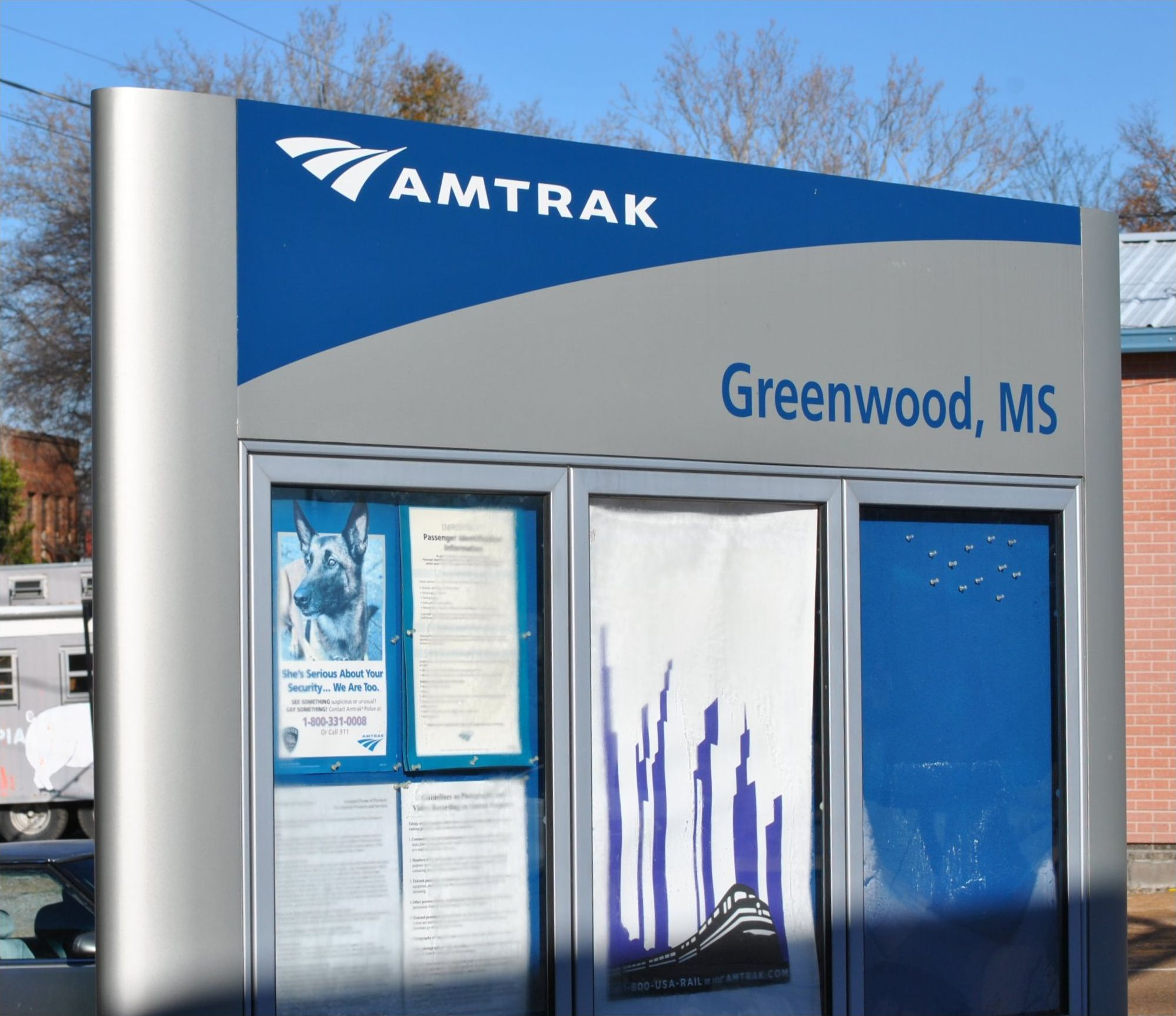

General information
- Location: 506 Carrollton Avenue; Greenwood, Mississippi; United States
- Coordinates: 33°31′01″N 90°10′35″W
- Line: Illinois Central (CN)
- Platforms: 1 side platform
- Tracks: 1

Construction
- Structure type: Red brick, two-story building

Other information
- Station code: Amtrak: GWD

History
- Opened: 1917
- Rebuilt: September 11, 1995

Passengers
- FY 2025: 13,794 (Amtrak)

Services
Preceding station	Amtrak	Following station
Yazoo City toward New Orleans	City of New Orleans	Marks toward Chicago
Former services
Preceding station	Illinois Central Railroad	Following station
Rising Sun toward Jackson	Clarksdale – Jackson	Grenada Junction toward Clarksdale
Grenada Junction toward Lake Cormorant	Lake Cormorant – Greenwood	Terminus
Terminus	Greenwood – Grenada	Grenada Junction toward Grenada
- Illinois Central Gulf Railroad Company
- U.S. Historic district – Contributing property
- Part of: Central Commercial and Railroad Historic District (ID85003463)
- Designated CP: November 4, 1985
Location

Greenwood station is an Amtrak intercity train station in Greenwood, Mississippi, United States. It is a stop on Amtrak's City of New Orleans line. The red brick depot was built around 1917 by the Yazoo and Mississippi Valley Railroad, a subsidiary of the Illinois Central Railroad. It is located in Greenwood's Railroad Historic District, added to the National Register of Historic Places in 1985.
