= City 2 City =

City 2 City may refer to:

- City2City - former bus operator in Germany
- song on the Cloud Nine (Kottonmouth Kings album)
- City 2 City ft. Belle Humble (song by EDM Artist Zomboy)
