= Yazoo City station =

Train station in Yazoo City, Mississippi, US

Yazoo City, MS
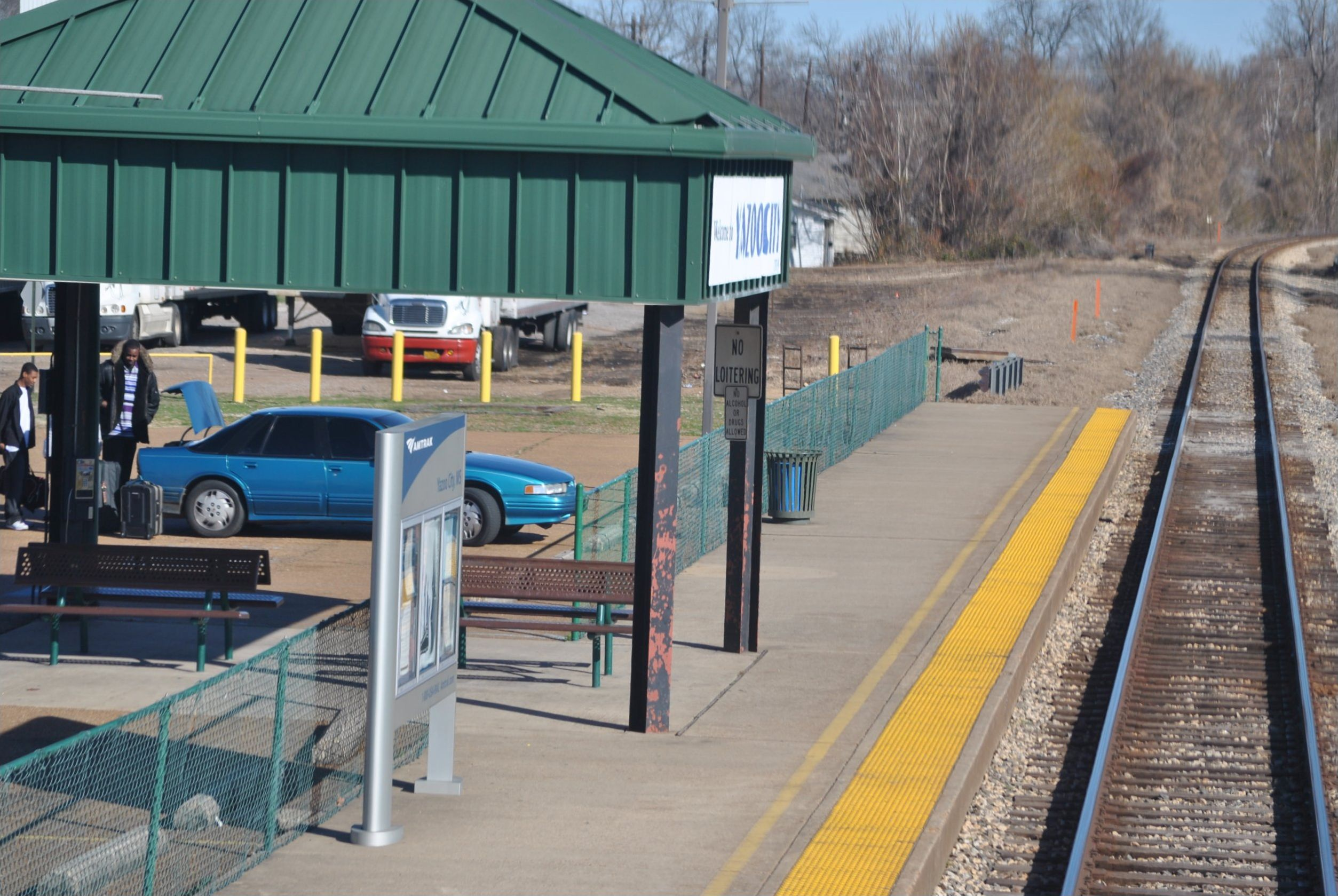

General information
- Location: 222 West Broadway; Yazoo City, Mississippi; United States
- Coordinates: 32.8484°N 90.4152°W
- Owner: Amtrak
- Line: Illinois Central (CN)
- Platforms: 1 side platform
- Tracks: 1

Construction
- Structure type: Shelter

Other information
- Status: Flag stop; unstaffed
- Station code: Amtrak: YAZ

History
- Rebuilt: September 11, 1995; October 2, 2023

Passengers
- FY 2025: 3,516 (Amtrak)

Services
Preceding station	Amtrak	Following station
Jackson toward New Orleans	City of New Orleans	Greenwood toward Chicago
Location

Yazoo City station is an Amtrak intercity train station in Yazoo City, Mississippi, United States. The station is unstaffed and requires notification in advance for the train to stop, because it is listed as a flag stop in the Amtrak timetable.
