= Dot2Dot =

- Trade name: Dot2Dot (Smooth Limited)
- Industry: Public Transport
- Founded: 2007
- Defunct: 2009
- Headquarters: London, England
- Area served: Greater London
- Products: Airport bus operator
- Parent: Corot plc
- Website: www.dot2.com

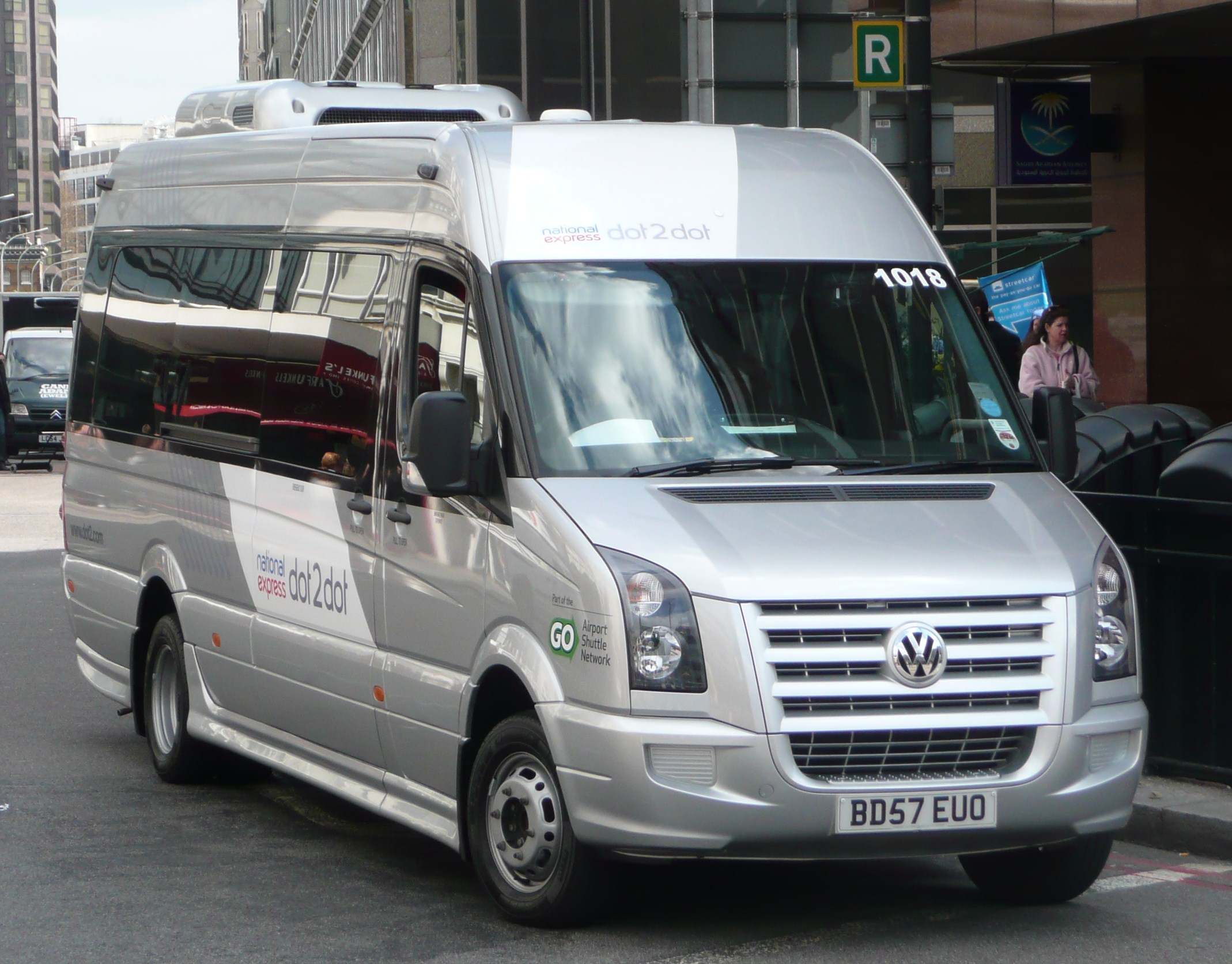
Volkswagen Crafter in Central London

Dot2Dot was a demand responsive airport bus service and company operating in London, United Kingdom. It started operations on 1 November 2007, after National Express rebranded the Hotelink business it acquired in April 2007.

Dot2Dot operated a mixed fleet of Mercedes-Benz Sprinter and Volkswagen Crafter minibuses and carried passengers from London's Heathrow and Gatwick airports to any location in a defined area of Central London or East London, and vice versa. The company promised to have no more than three stops between pick-up and drop-off. On 18 July 2008, Dot2Dot withdrew the service to Gatwick Airport, though this was later re-instated.

National Express announced in late 2008 that not having turned a profit, Dot2Dot would close in early 2009 if no buyer was found. In January 2009, Dot2Dot was sold to Corot plc of Milton Keynes for £1. Operations ceased in November 2009.

== See also ==
- EasyBus
- Edinburgh Shuttle, a similar operation in Edinburgh
