= Godbold Transportation Center =

Train station in Brookhaven, Mississippi, US

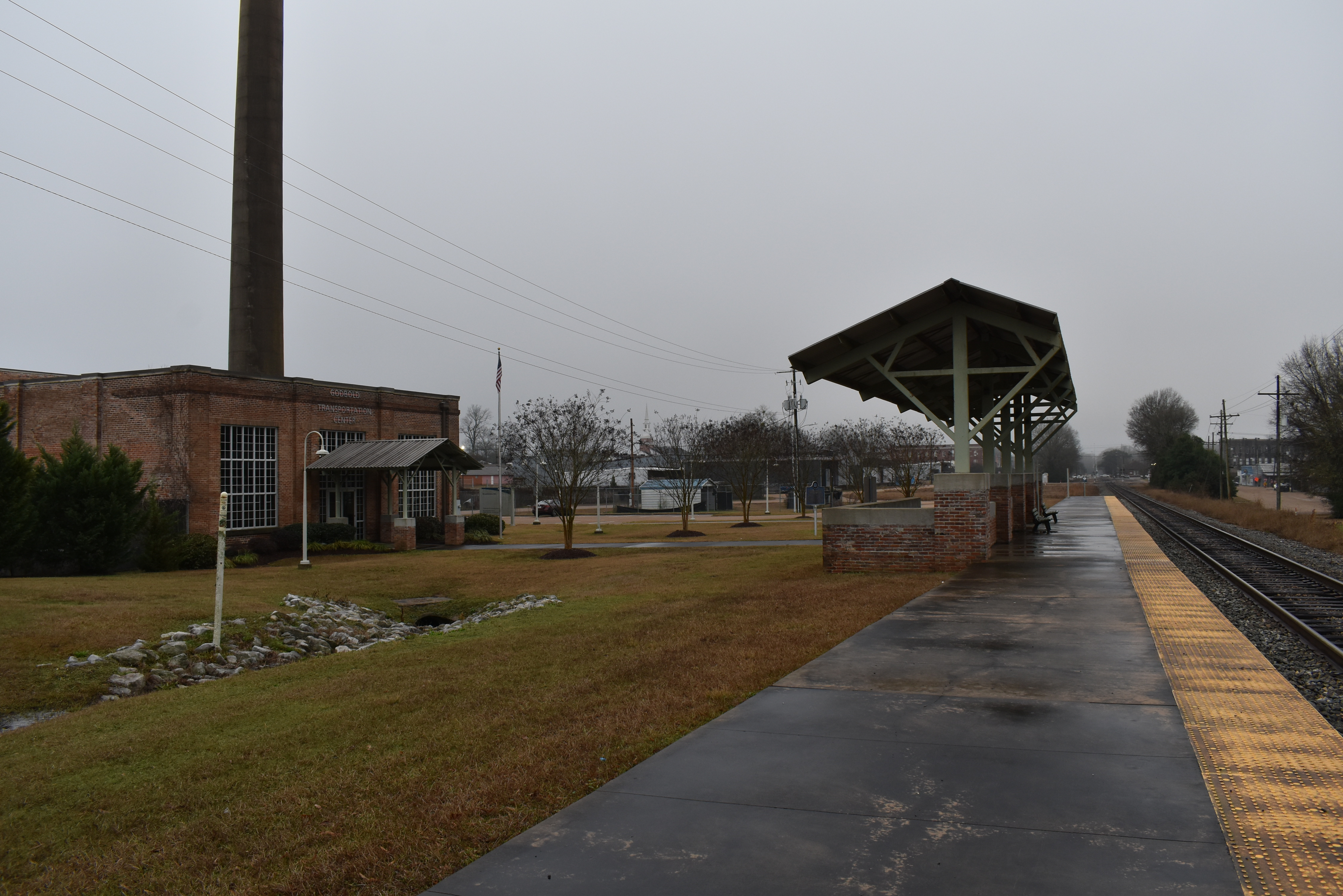
- The Transportation Center in January 2023

General information
- Location: 440 North Railroad Avenue; Brookhaven, Mississippi; United States
- Coordinates: 31°34′59″N 90°26′28″W
- Owner: City of Brookhaven
- Line: Illinois Central (CN)
- Platforms: 1 side platform
- Tracks: 1

Other information
- Station code: Amtrak code: BRH

History
- Opened: 1907 (Union Station); 2011 (Transportation Center)

Passengers
- FY 2025: 3,492 (Amtrak)

Services
Preceding station	Amtrak	Following station
McComb toward New Orleans	City of New Orleans	Hazlehurst toward Chicago
Former services
Preceding station	Illinois Central Railroad	Following station
Hartman toward New Orleans	Main Line	Montgomery toward Chicago
Location

The Godbold Transportation Center is a train station in Brookhaven, Mississippi, United States, served by Amtrak's City of New Orleans passenger train.

The facility is located in the town's old power plant, originally constructed in 1890. Renovation plans called for partial demolition of the power plant, but the soaring smokestack was retained as a symbol of the building's industrial heritage. Large expanses of glass on the principal elevations allow natural light to flood the waiting room. The wooden benches used by passengers were once located in the old Illinois Central depot.

== History ==
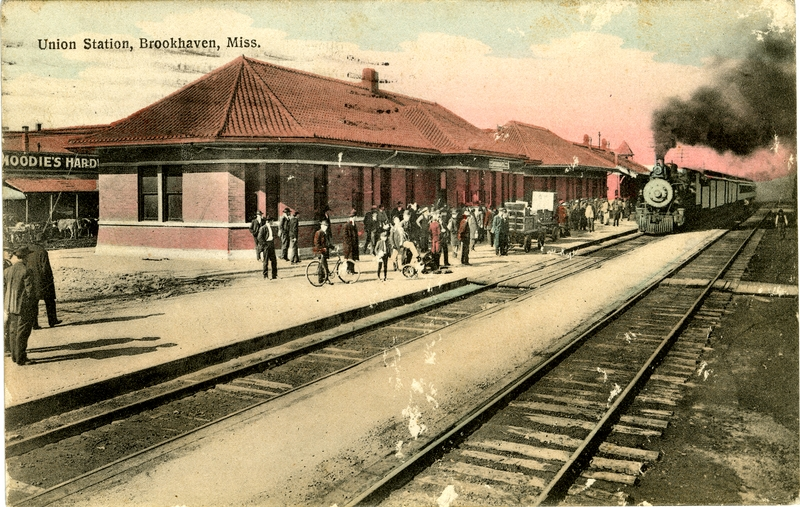
Postcard of the former Brookhaven Union Station built by Illinois Central Railroad, now a military museum

Brookhaven was a hub between the Illinois Central (formerly the New Orleans, Jackson and Great Northern), the Brookhaven and Pearl River Railroad, the Mississippi Central, and the Meridian, Brookhaven, and Natchez Railroad. In 1907, Illinois Central constructed the Union Station and freight house in downtown Brookhaven. Designed by F. D. Chase, the Tudor-revival brick building was placed on the National Register of Historic Places in 1980.

The old station building, located at 125 South Whitworth Avenue,(31°34′44″N 90°26′35″W) is now occupied by the Military Memorial Museum.

Godbold Transportation Center, named after a former Brookhaven Mayor Bill Godbold, opened in 2011. This replaced a small shelter beside the old depot building that had been used by Amtrak.
