= City2City =

- Parent: National Express Group
- Commenced operation: 2 April 2013
- Ceased operation: October 2014
- Service area: Germany
- Service type: Intercity coach operator
- Fleet: 25 (October 2014)
- Website: www.city2city.de

City2City was an intercity coach operator providing services in Germany. It was a subsidiary of National Express, the largest intercity coach operator in the United Kingdom.

== History ==
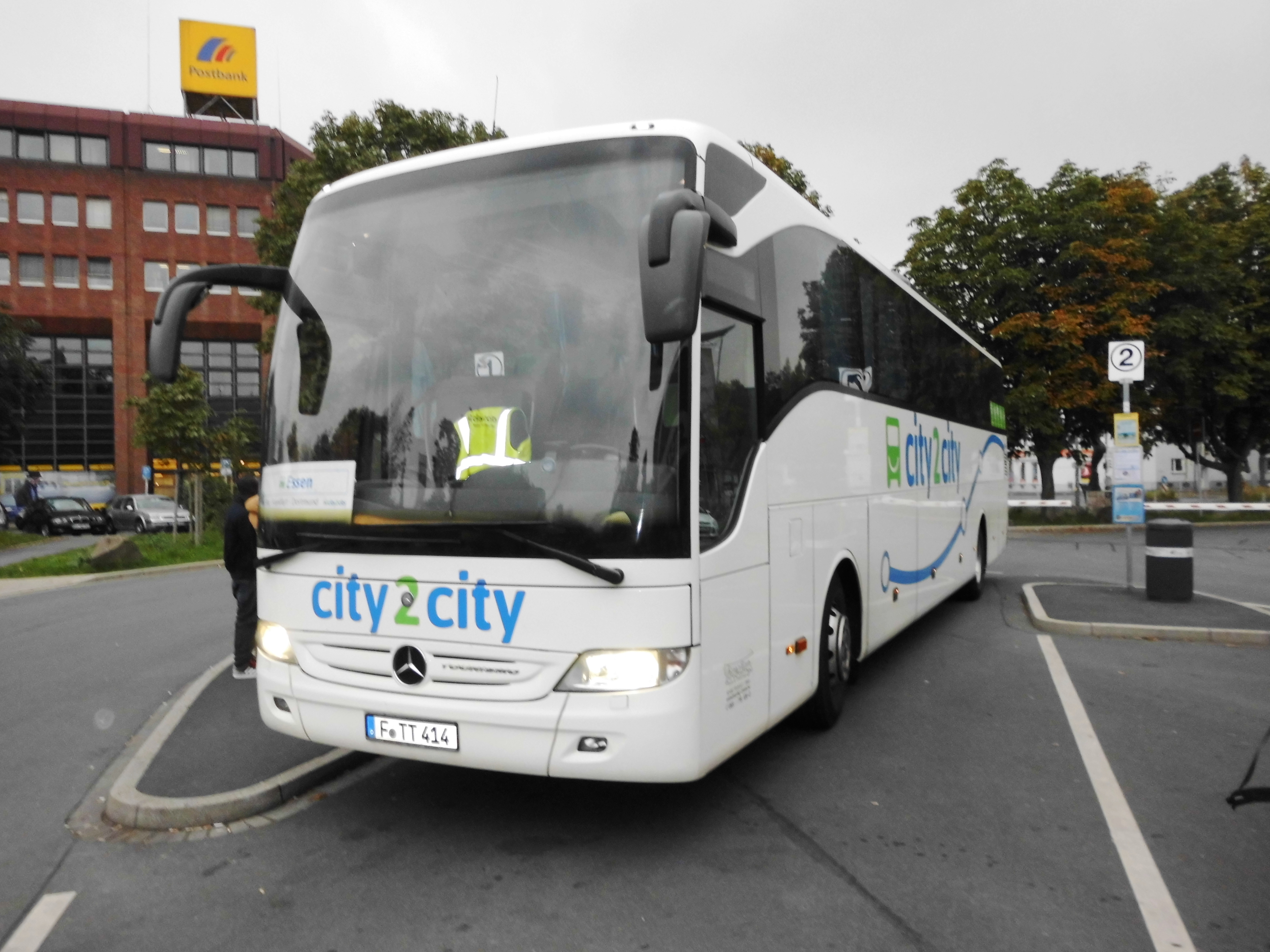
Mercedes-Benz Tourismo in September 2014

City2City was launched on 2 April 2013 with 15 Mercedes-Benz Tourismos. It ceased in October 2014 with National Express citing the congested market making it unlikely to be profitable, making it the first coach operator to cease operating after the intercity coach market was deregulated.

== Routes ==
Cities on the network included Frankfurt, Cologne, Düsseldorf, Dortmund, Duisburg, Stuttgart, Munich, Bremen and Hanover. Cologne and Frankfurt airports were served by City2City.

== Fleet ==
Operations commenced in April 2013 with 15 Mercedes-Benz Tourismo coaches. When operations ceased in October 2014, the fleet comprised 25 vehicles.
