= Lucketts Travel =

British bus operating company

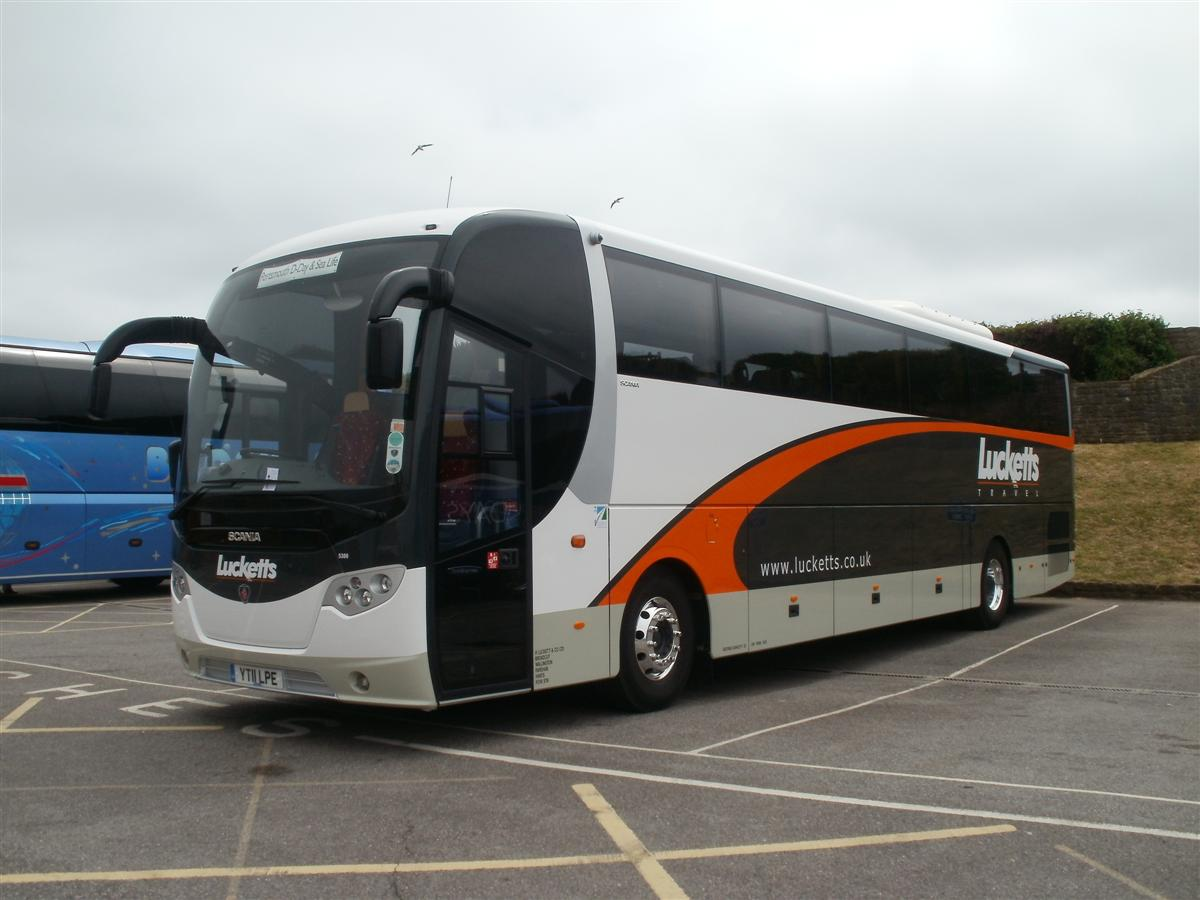
- Scania LK400EB OmniExpress 3.60 in the older Lucketts livery in May 2011
- Parent: The Coach Travel Group
- Founded: 1926; 100 years ago
- Headquarters: Fareham
- Service area: Hampshire; West Sussex
- Service type: Coach services
- Depots: 3
- Fleet: 160 (March 2020)
- Chief executive: David Luckett
- Website: www.lucketts.co.uk

Lucketts Travel is a coach hire and excursion company with depots in Fareham, Worthing and Southampton. It is a subsidiary of The Coach Travel Group.

== History ==
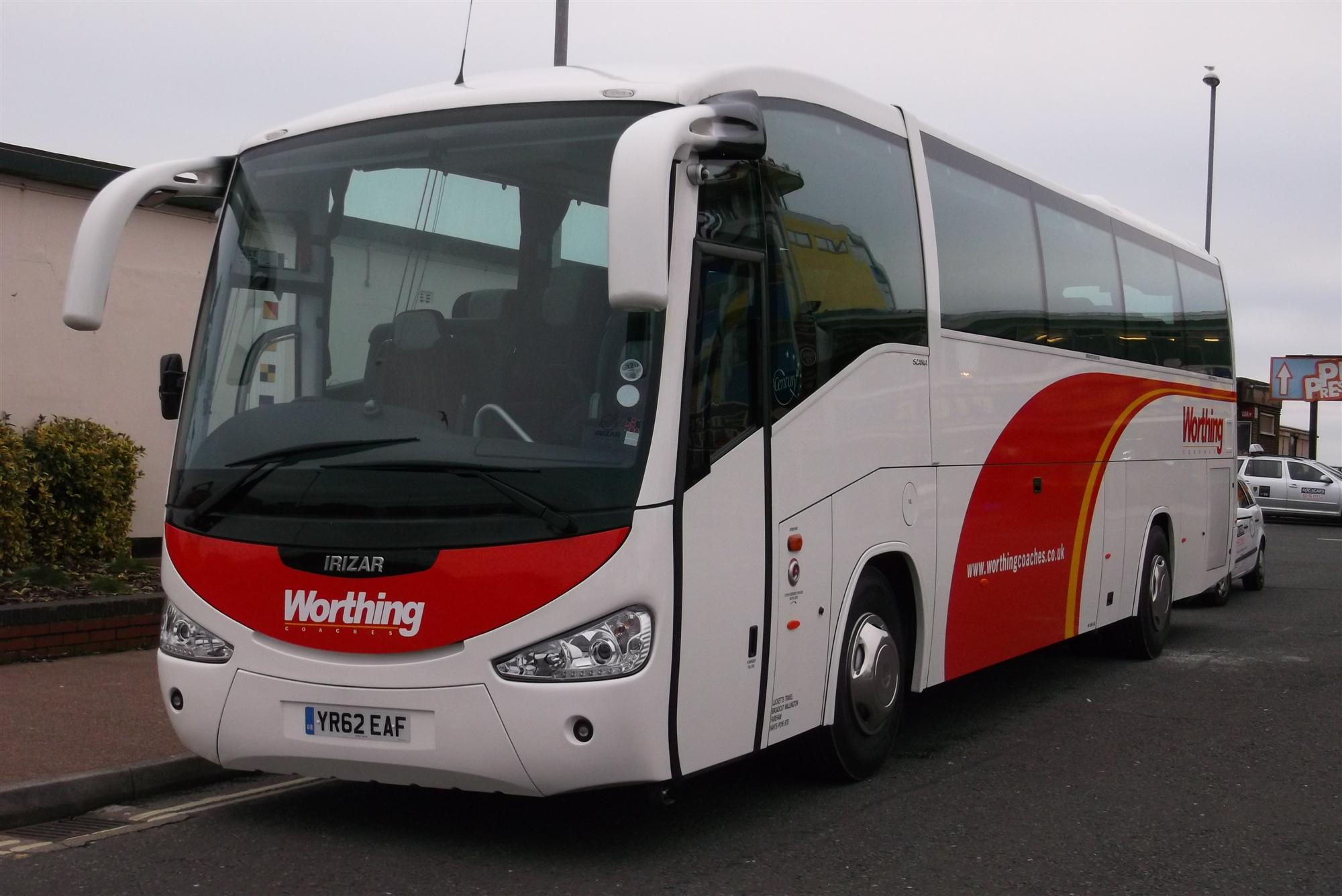
Irizar Century bodied Scania K340EB in Worthing Coaches livery in January 2013

The company was founded in 1926 by Harry Luckett as a haulage and storage company and only bought its first coach in 1976. Harry's son David joined the company in 1963 and took over shortly after in 1966 when Harry died unexpectedly. The company’s haulage business continued to grow in the late 1960s and early 1970s, with Ready Mix Concrete and Schweppes major clients.

In 1976 David purchased the company’s first coach, choosing to drive it himself. It proved a very enjoyable and successful venture and a second coach was soon purchased. By the mid-1980s the coach fleet had outnumbered the haulage fleet.

=== Growth and acquisitions ===
In 2005 the Worthing Coaches business was purchased followed in March 2006 by Flagship from Eastbourne Buses.

In January 2009 Lucketts Travel took over operation of National Express routes from Portsmouth to London Victoria Coach Station (030), Heathrow Airport (203) and Bristol (300) from Tellings-Golden Miller.

In March 2012 Coliseum Coaches was purchased with 12 coaches. In March 2013, Lucketts commenced operating further National Express services; London Victoria Coach Station - Brighton (025) and Victoria Coach Station - Gatwick Airport (A3).

In December 2017, the Lucketts Group acquired fellow coach operator, Solent Coaches with 12 vehicles. In April 2018, North Hampshire firm, Mortons Travel was purchased with 35 vehicles.

=== National Express takeover ===
In March 2020 the business was purchased by National Express.

In January 2023, the coach excursion business of Lucketts Travel and six other National Express Transport Solutions companies were brought together under the 'Touromo' brand. The Lucketts name, as well as the names of the coach companies it had acquired, were to be retained for private hire services.

In September 2024, Mortons Travel was sold off by the parent company to Rambler Group Holdings.

=== The Coach Travel Group ===
In October 2025, it was announced by Mobico Group that Lucketts, Worthing Coaches, Coliseum and Solent Coaches had been divested, joining former stablemate Stewarts Coaches of Reading in the Tom Stables led company. Andrew Luckett, part of the family that founded Lucketts Travel, was appointed Chief Technology Officer by The Coach Travel Group.

== Fleet ==
As at April 2013, the fleet consisted of 103 vehicles. The breakdown was Lucketts (54 vehicles), Worthing (8), Coliseum (12) and National Express (29).

In January 2013 a new common livery was introduced. A predominantly white base is offset with a swoop- brown/orange in the case of Lucketts, red/yellow for Worthing Coaches and grey/orange for Coliseum, which also carries a stylised depiction of the Coliseum in Rome. Coaches dedicated to National Express services are painted in the client's livery.

== See also ==
- List of bus operators of the United Kingdom
