= McComb station =

Train station in McComb, Mississippi, U.S.

McComb, MS
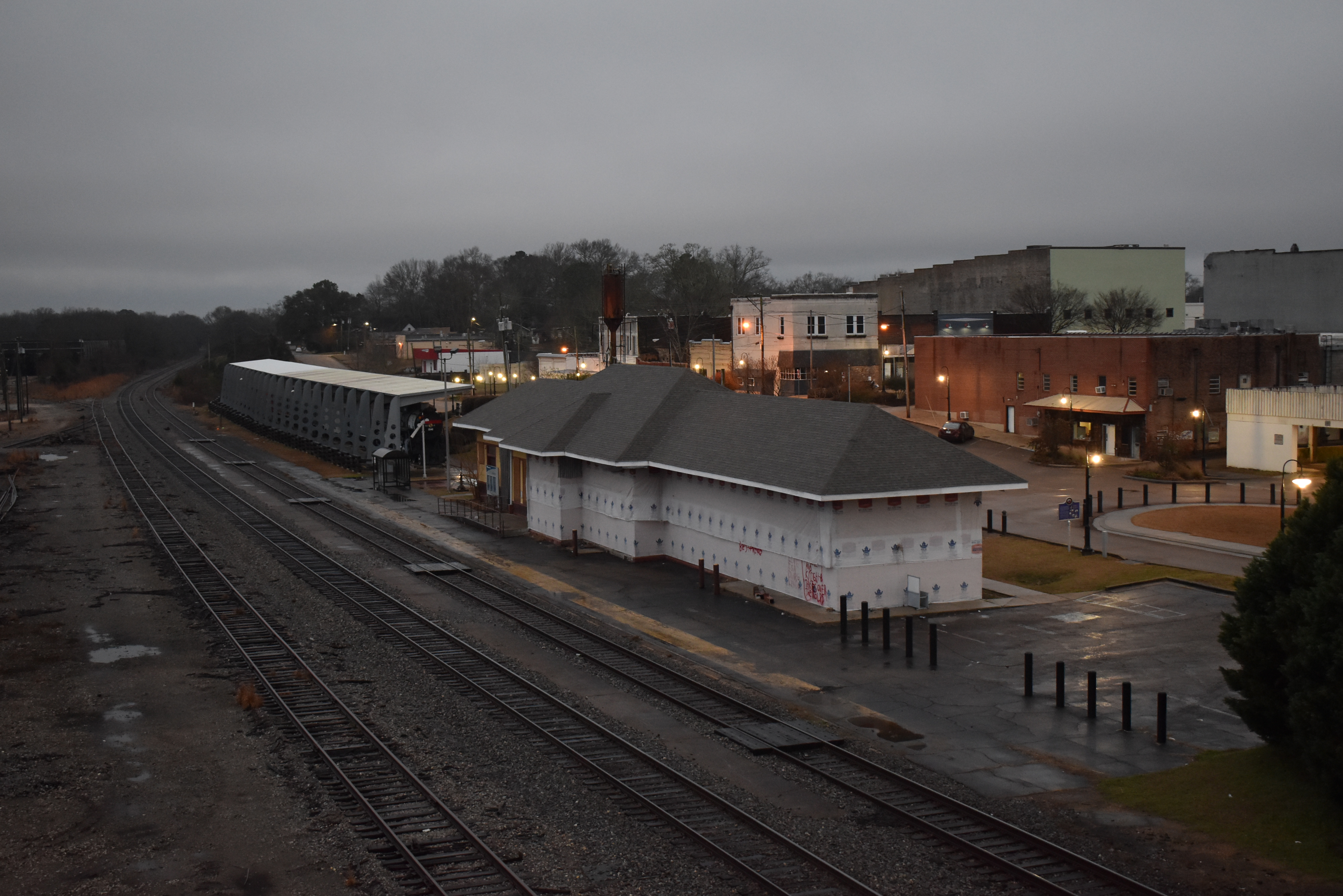
- McComb station in January 2023

General information
- Location: 114 North Railroad Boulevard; McComb, Mississippi; United States
- Coordinates: 31°14′40″N 90°27′04″W
- Owner: City of McComb
- Line: Illinois Central (CN)
- Platforms: 1 side platform, 1 island platform
- Tracks: 3

Construction
- Structure type: One story wooden clapboard historic station building
- Parking: Dedicated parking spaces

Other information
- Status: Flag stop
- Station code: Amtrak code: MCB

History
- Opened: 1901
- Rebuilt: 1998, 2003

Passengers
- FY 2025: 4,024 (Amtrak)

Services
Preceding station	Amtrak	Following station
Hammond toward New Orleans	City of New Orleans	Brookhaven toward Chicago
Former services
Preceding station	Illinois Central Railroad	Following station
South McComb toward New Orleans	Main Line	Summit toward Chicago
Location

McComb station is a train station in McComb, Mississippi, United States, serving Amtrak's City of New Orleans passenger train. This is a flag stop and the trains only stop if passengers have tickets to and from the station. On May 30, 2021, the station building fell victim to arson and was believed to be a total loss. However, after the structure was inspected by an architectural firm, as well as two construction contractors experienced in rehabilitating burned structures, it was determined in November 2021, that most of the depot's walls could be saved in the central area and southern ends of the building. On January 3, 2022, Pike Construction of Mississippi began the rebuilding process, which is expected to take 9–12 months to complete.

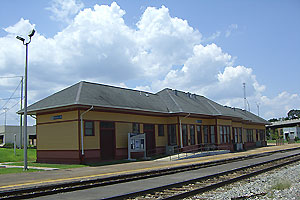
The depot in 2010

== History ==
The station was built in 1901 by the Illinois Central Railroad and was restored in 1998, and again on June 13, 2003. The station house is currently the home of the McComb Railroad Museum. It also houses the waiting room for Amtrak passengers.
