= Hazlehurst station =

Train station in Mississippi, United States

Hazlehurst, MS
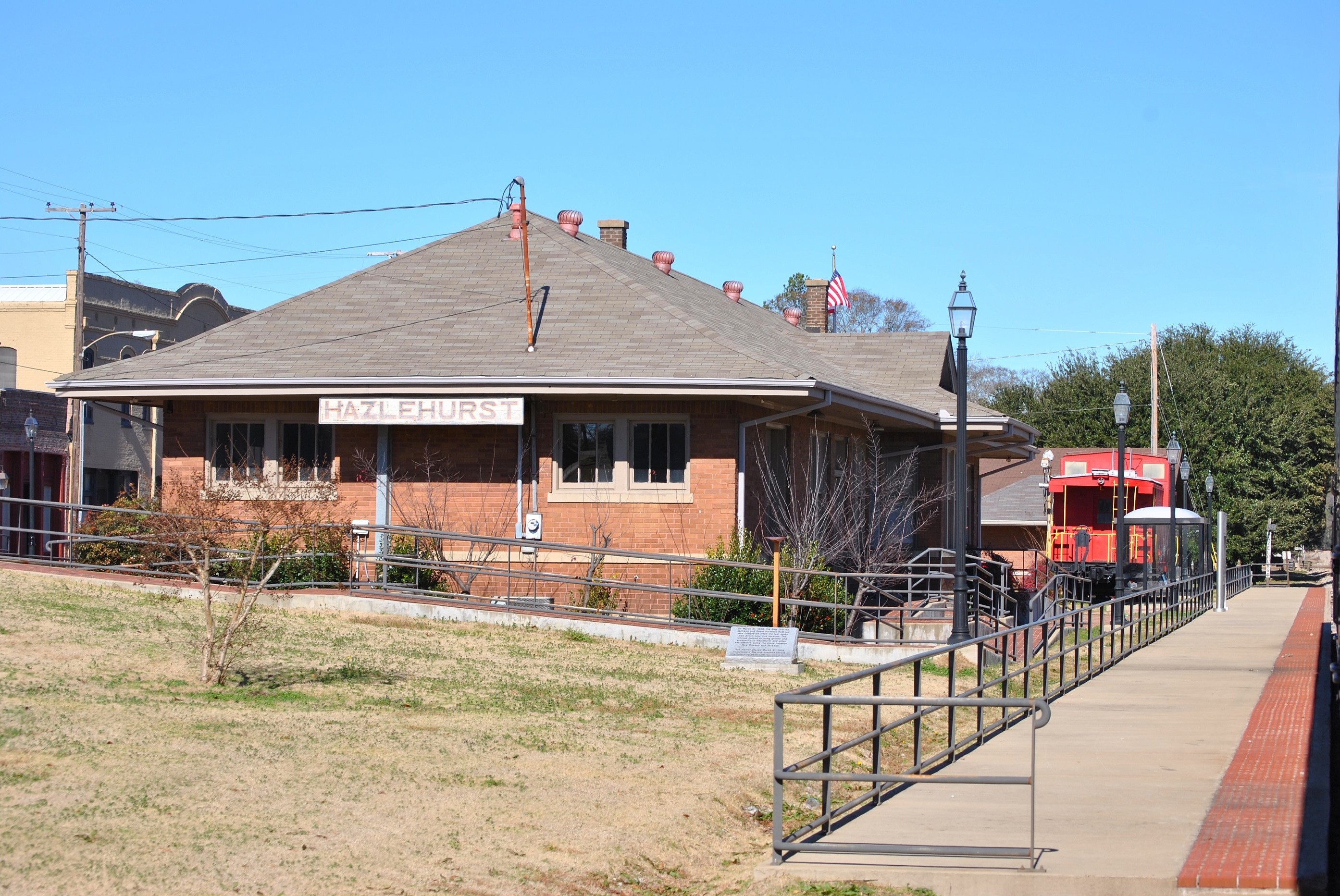

General information
- Location: 138 North Ragsdale Avenue; Hazlehurst, Mississippi; United States
- Coordinates: 31°51′41″N 90°23′40″W
- Line: Illinois Central (CN)
- Platforms: 1 side platform
- Tracks: 1

Other information
- Status: Flag stop; unstaffed
- Station code: Amtrak: HAZ

Passengers
- 1,517 (Amtrak)

Services
| Preceding station | Amtrak | Following station |
|---|---|---|
| Brookhaven toward New Orleans | City of New Orleans | Jackson toward Chicago |
Former services
| Preceding station | Illinois Central Railroad | Following station |
|---|---|---|
| Beauregard toward New Orleans | Main Line | Crystal Springs toward Chicago |
- Illinois Central Railroad Passenger Depot
- U.S. National Register of Historic Places
- Location: Hazlehurst, Mississippi
- Built: 1925
- NRHP reference No.: 96000182
- Added to NRHP: 1996
Location

Hazlehurst station is an Amtrak intercity train station in Hazlehurst, Mississippi, United States, served by the City of New Orleans passenger train. The station, an unstaffed flag stop, consists of a single platform with a small shelter, located next to the old Illinois Central Railroad Depot, which was built in 1925 and is now occupied by the Hazlehurst Depot Museum.
