= Jackson Transit System =

Public transportation organization in Jackson, Mississippi

- Founded: 1965
- Headquarters: Highway 80
- Locale: Jackson, Mississippi
- Service area: City of Jackson
- Service type: Bus service Paratransit
- Routes: 11
- Stops: 540
- Hubs: Union Station
- Fleet: 40
- Operator: Transdev
- Website: ridejtran.com

The Jackson Transit System (known as JTRAN) operates fixed-route and an ADA paratransit demand response service throughout the City of Jackson, Mississippi, United States. The base fare is $1.50, $1 for students with school ID; $0.75 for kids 6–14; and $0.50 for seniors at least 60, disabled or Medicare. There is a 3-children limit to kids below 6 who ride for free when accompanied by a fare-paying rider.

== History ==
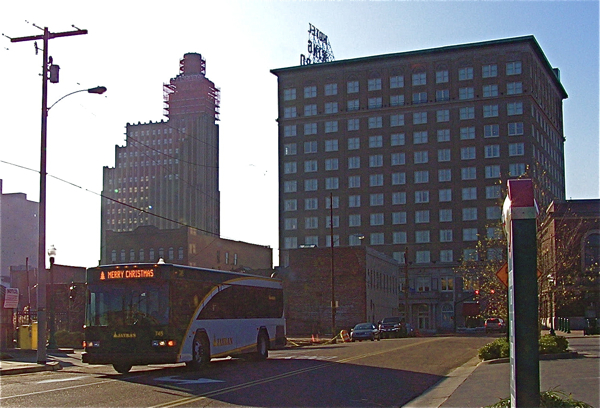

From October 1, 2015, until December 31, 2018, the services were operated under a contractual arrangement by National Express Transit. Beginning January 1, 2019, the operator has been Transdev. The service is managed by the city's Transit Services Division in the Office of City Planning, Department of Planning and Development.

== Services ==
JTRAN operates from 5:45 AM to approximately 7:05 PM on weekdays and from 6:15 AM to approximately 7:05 PM on Saturdays. There is no service on Sundays.

All routes depart from Union Station, located at 300 West Capitol Street and generally depart at 15 or 45 past the hour.

A major route overhaul took place in March 2024. It was intended to simplify schedules, make the routes more direct, and provide easier access to grocery stores across the city.

Service to the industrial area around Boiling Avenue via bus route 45 was indefinitely suspended in January 2025.

Route list
No.	Name	Notes
10	N. State/Frontage	These two routes primarily serve North State Street before diverging at Northside Drive — Route 10 serves I-55's frontage roads, and Route 15 serves Tougaloo College and North State Street north of Northside Drive. The two reconnect in both directions at Ridgewood Court Plaza.
15	N. State/Tougaloo	These two routes primarily serve North State Street before diverging at Northside Drive — Route 10 serves I-55's frontage roads, and Route 15 serves Tougaloo College and North State Street north of Northside Drive. The two reconnect in both directions at Ridgewood Court Plaza.
20	Woodrow Wilson	Serves the University of Mississippi Medical Center.
25	Bailey	Primarily serves Bailey Avenue.
35	Medgar Evers	Primarily serves North West Street and Medgar Evers Boulevard. Ends at the former Food Depot location on Northside Drive.
40	Capitol/Queens	Travels along Capitol Street and later Clinton Street from the downtown core, then turns north onto Flag Chapel Road, then east on Northside Drive before ending at the former Food Depot location.
50	Jackson State	Serves Jackson State University, the Merit Health Central hospital, and the Walmart on Chadwick Drive.
55	Robinson	Primarily serves Robinson Road, with a diversion serving Hinds Behavioral Health Services on US 80. The route ends at the Walmart on Chadwick Drive.
60	Raymond/McDowell	
65	Terry/Cooper	
70	Ellis	Primary serves Belvedere Drive and Bobby Blues Boulevard (formerly known as Ellis Avenue).

== Fleet ==
As of 2026, the fleet comprises 13 buses and includes the following:

- Gillig Low Floor 29’
- Gillig Low Floor 35’
- Gillig Low Floor HEV 35’
- Gillig Low Floor 40’

== Depot ==
JTRAN operated out of a depot on University Boulevard. When National Express took over in October 2015, it moved to a new depot on Highway 80.

== Fixed Route Ridership ==
The ridership and service statistics shown here are of fixed route services only and do not include demand response.

== See also ==
- List of bus transit systems in the United States
- Jackson Union Station
