= Busbud =

Travel website

- Busbud
- Website type: Travel and accommodation services
- Founded: 2011
- Headquarters: Montreal, Quebec, Canada
- Founders: LP Maurice (CEO), Michael Gradek (CTO), and Frederic Thouin (CAO).
- Industry: Travel
- Employees: 60+ (2019)
- Subsidiaries: Recorrido, (Buson), Betterez Inc., and Retality Solutions.
- Website: www.busbud.com

Busbud is a travel website specializing in intercity bus tickets as well as travel by trains, shuttles, ferries and carpooling. As of 2017 Busbud covered services in North America, South America, Central America, Europe, Africa, Oceania and Asia.

== History ==
Busbud was founded in 2011 by Louis-Philippe Maurice, Michael Gradek, and Frederic Thouin after Maurice identified a lack of centralized digital booking options while traveling in South America. The company was established in Montreal, Canada.

In May 2013, Busbud completed a seed round financing of $1.2 million US dollar. In February 2022 Busbud announced an US$11 million funding round.

Still in 2022 Busbud merged with Recorrido, an intercity bus marketplace based in Santiago and acquired Betterez, a reservation and ticketing management platform for ground transportation operators.

In March 2024, the company acquired Buson, a bus booking marketplace in Brazil. This was noted as their largest M&A transaction at the time. In May of the same year, Busbud acquired the South African software provider Ratality.
