= Union Station (Jackson, Mississippi) =

Intermodal transit station in Jackson, Mississippi

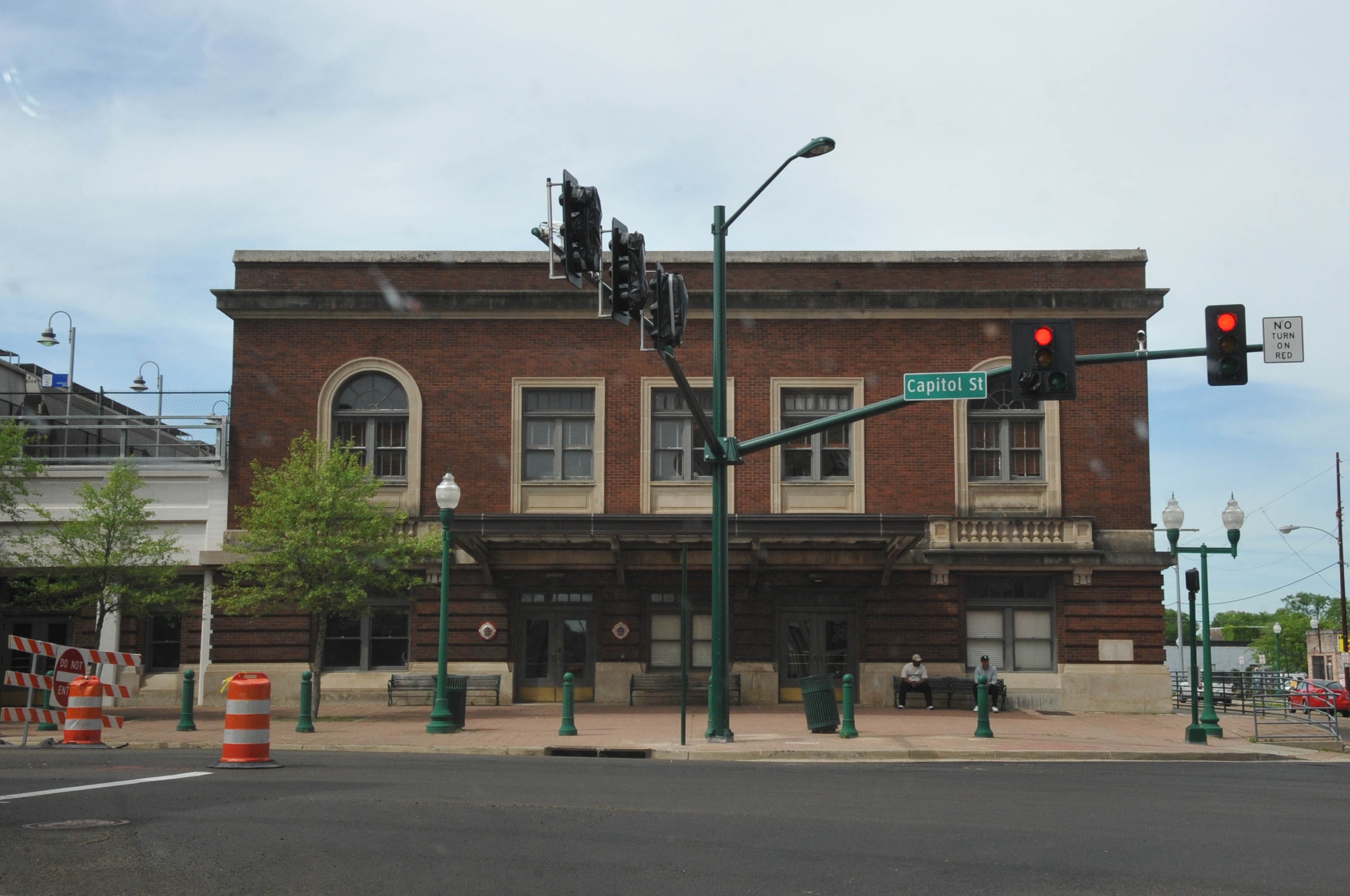
- Train station building as seen from Capitol Street

General information
- Location: 300 West Capitol Street; Jackson, Mississippi; United States
- Coordinates: 32°18′04″N 90°11′28″W
- Owner: City of Jackson
- Line: Illinois Central (CN)
- Platforms: 1 side platform in use 3 island platforms disused
- Tracks: 1 passenger (6 freight)
- Train operators: Amtrak
- Bus stands: 11 JATRAN; 10 Greyhound
- Bus operators: Jackson Transit System; Greyhound Lines

Construction
- Parking: 10 short and 73 long term spaces
- Accessible: Yes

Other information
- Station code: Amtrak: JAN

History
- Opened: 1927
- Rebuilt: 2003–2004

Passengers
- FY 2025: 38,187 (Amtrak)

Services
Preceding station	Amtrak	Following station
Hazlehurst toward New Orleans	City of New Orleans	Yazoo City toward Chicago
Former services
Preceding station	Amtrak	Following station
Hazlehurst toward New Orleans	City of New Orleans	Canton before 1995 toward Chicago
Preceding station	Illinois Central Railroad	Following station
Elton toward New Orleans	Main Line	Northview toward Chicago
Terminus	Clarksdale – Jackson	Asylum toward Clarksdale
Clinton toward Shreveport	Vicksburg Route Division	Pearson toward Meridian
Van Winkle toward Natchez	Natchez – Jackson	Terminus
Terminus	Gulf and Ship Island Railroad	Lakeland toward Gulfport
Proposed services
Preceding station	Amtrak	Following station
Vicksburg toward Fort Worth	Crescent Proposed Texas Section	Meridian toward New York

Mississippi Landmark
Location

Union Station is an intermodal transit station in Jackson, Mississippi, United States. It is operated by the Jackson Transit System and serves Amtrak's City of New Orleans and later proposed Crescent Texas section rail line, Greyhound Lines intercity buses, and is Jackson's main city bus station.

== History ==
Train service first came to Jackson, Mississippi in 1840, when the Clinton and Vicksburg Railway established a connection. The city became a more prominent rail hub after the American Civil War as a stop for what eventually became the Illinois Central Railroad. The modern Georgian Revival station was built in 1927 by Illinois Central when the rail lines were rebuilt through downtown.

=== Passenger trains served in past ===
The Illinois Central operated trains to these endpoints through the station:

- Chicago and New Orleans (including City of New Orleans and the all-Pullman Panama Limited and others)
- Chicago and Gulfport, Mississippi
- Shreveport, Louisiana and Meridian, Mississippi (Southwestern Limited)

The Alabama and Vicksburg Railway operated trains in cooperation with the Southern Railway and Vicksburg, Shreveport & Pacific Railway to these endpoints:

- Shreveport and Atlanta
- Shreveport and Louisville
- Shreveport and Cincinnati

=== Revival ===
After years of disuse, in 2003 the City of Jackson purchased the building from the Canadian National Railway, the successor to Illinois Central, with the intention of turning it into a multimodal hub named Union Station. The city undertook a $20 million renovation funded by the Intermodal Surface Transportation Efficiency Act and the Jackson Redevelopment Authority; Dale and Associates were chosen as architects. The city converted the building into the Jackson Transit System's primary bus station and added facilities for Greyhound Lines. The former freighthouse was converted for use by Amtrak, and other areas of the building were redesigned for commercial use. Dale and Associates received a 2005 Mississippi AIA Merit Award for the completed project. It is listed as a Mississippi Landmark.
