= Mercedes-Benz Tourismo =

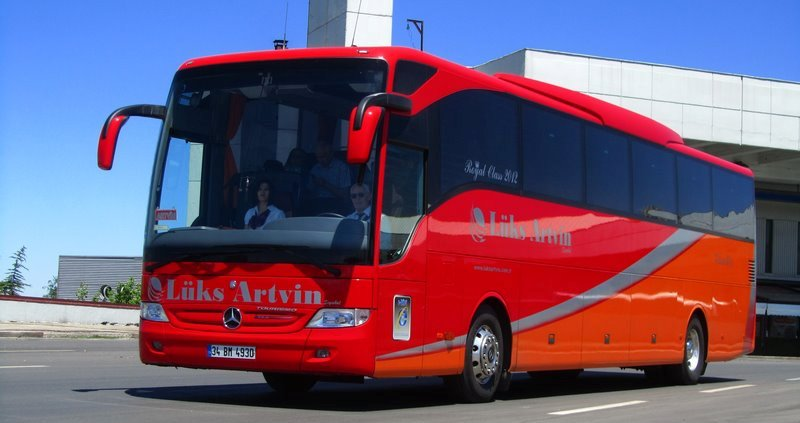

Overview
- Manufacturer: Mercedes-Benz
- Production: 1994–present

Body and chassis
- Doors: 2
- Chassis: OC 500 Raised floor (RF) Euro VI

Powertrain
- Engine: Mercedes-Benz BlueEfficiency Power OM 470 engine
- Power output: 265kW
- Transmission: Mercedes-Benz 6-speed, GO 210, servo-assisted

Dimensions
- Length: 12,140mm
- Width: 2550mm
- Height: 3620mm

The Mercedes-Benz Tourismo (formerly designated as the Mercedes-Benz O 350) is an integral coach manufactured by Mercedes-Benz since 1994. It was initially manufactured in Başakşehir, Turkey. In 2006 a revised version was launched. By 2014, 21,000 had been sold.

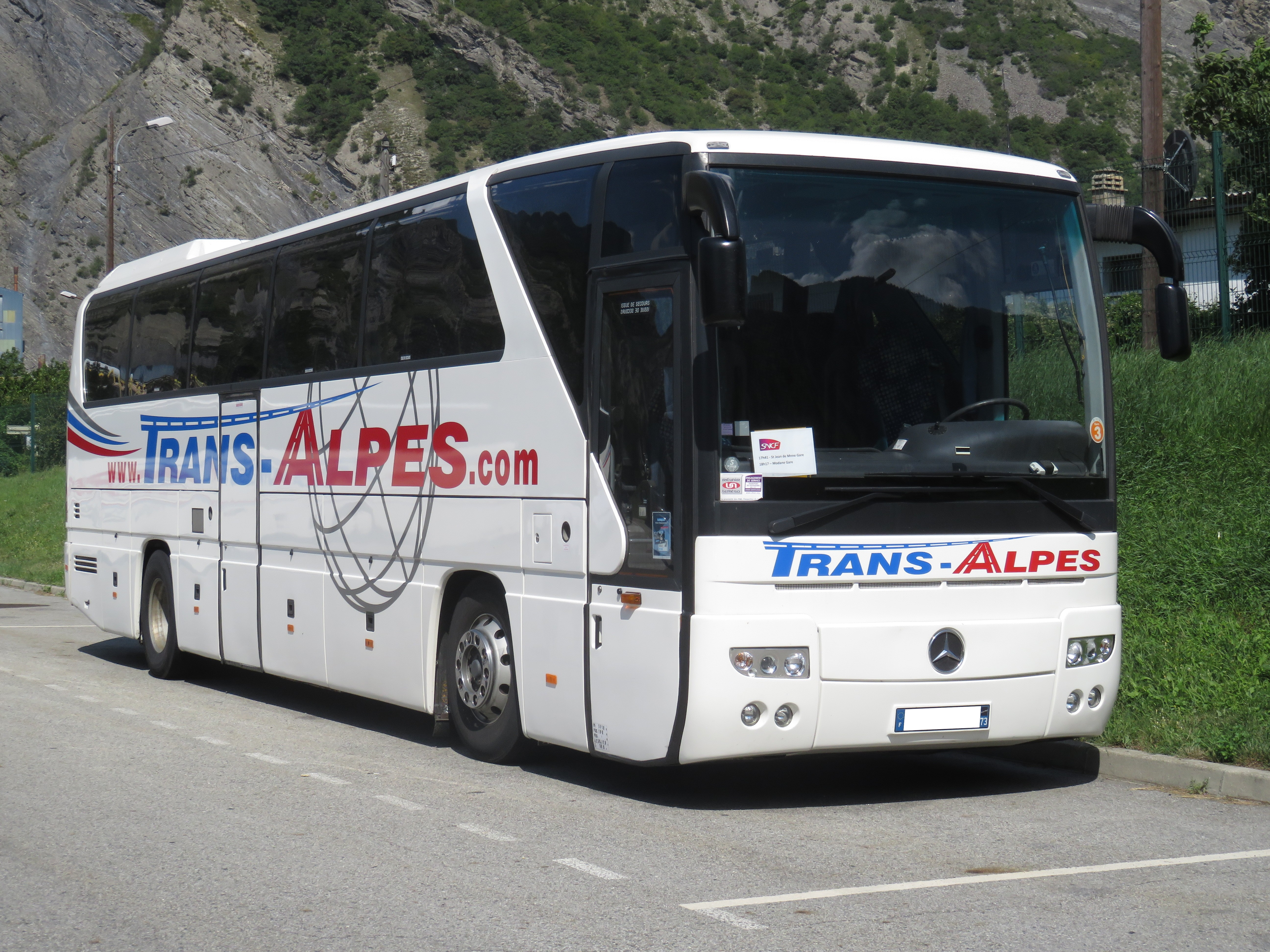
1st generation

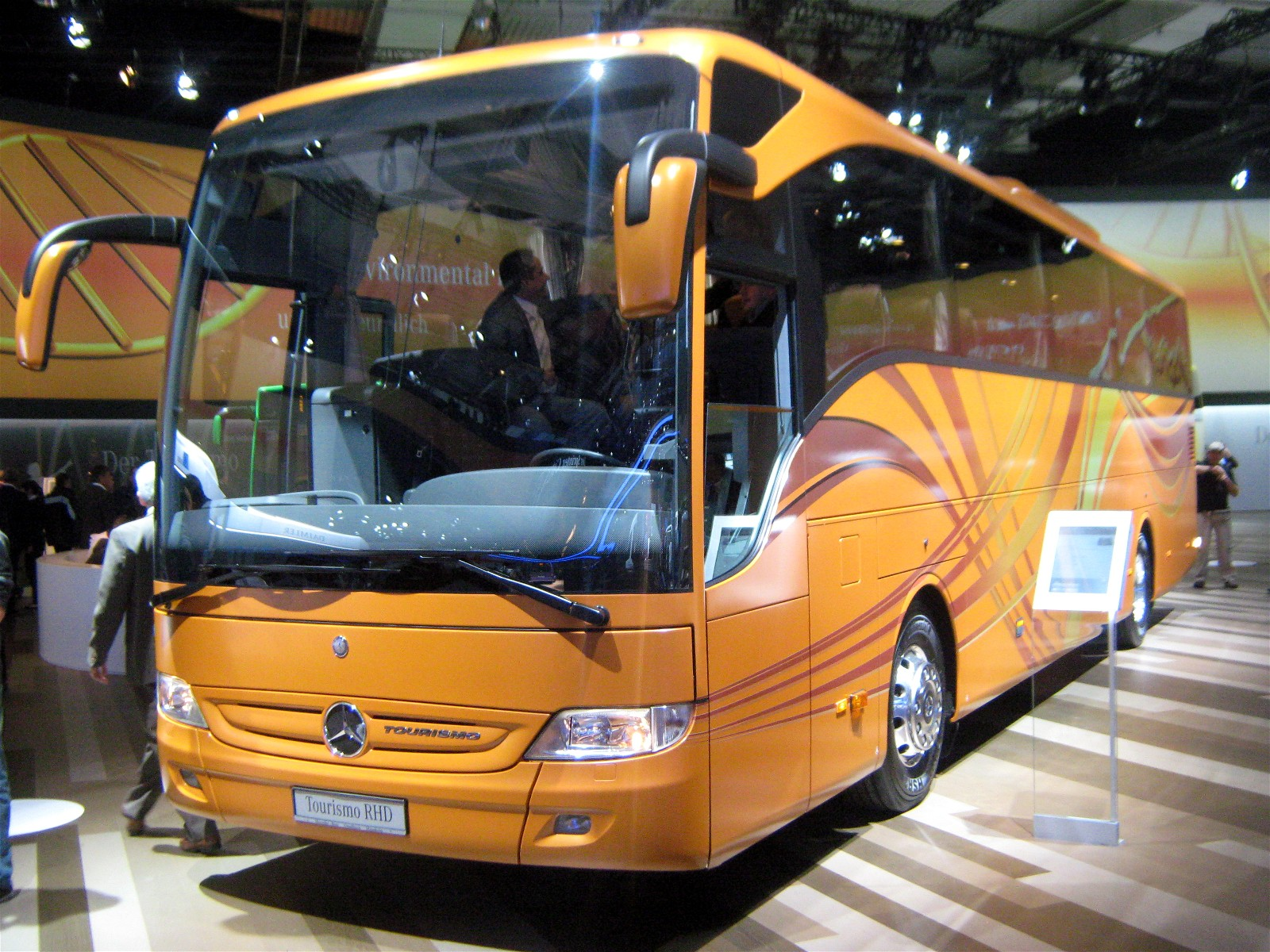
2nd generation

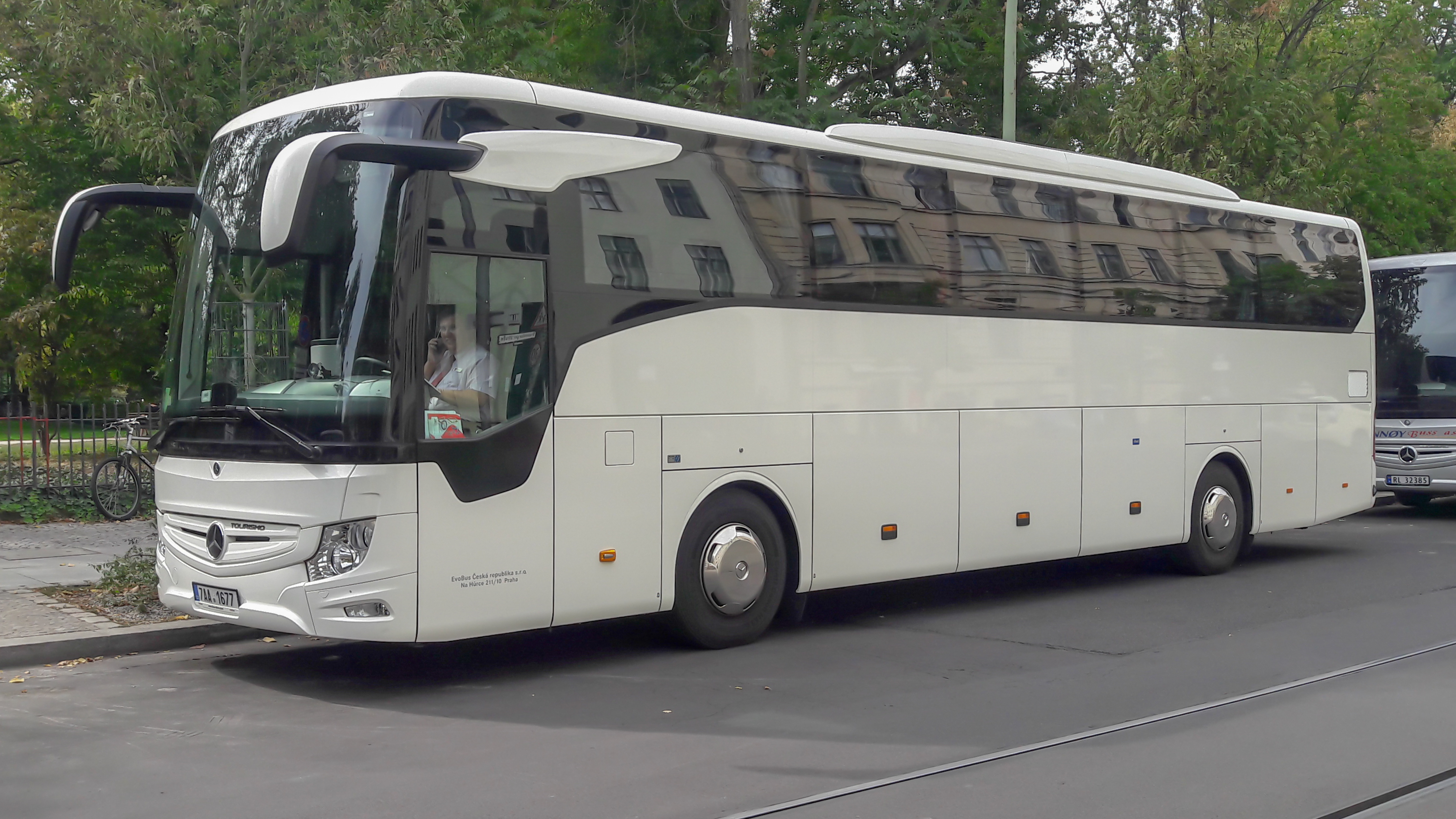
3rd generation
