= Airport bus =

Transport to, from or within airports

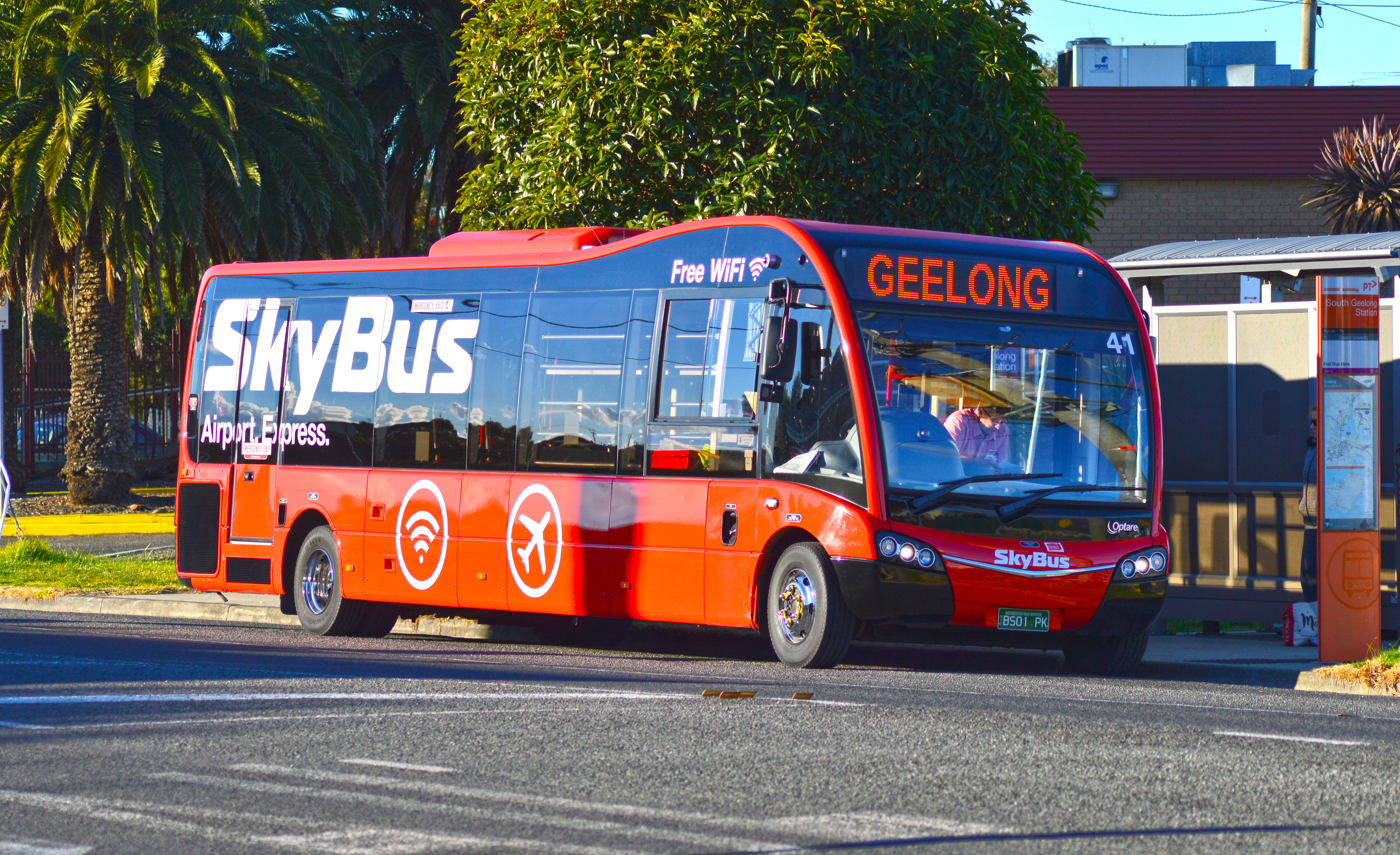
An Skybus airport shuttle bus in Victoria, Australia

An airport bus, or airport shuttle bus, alternatively simply airport shuttle or shuttle bus, is a bus designed for transport of passengers to and from, or within airports. These vehicles will usually be equipped with larger luggage space, and incorporate special branding. They are also commonly (but not always) painted with bright colours to stand out among other airport vehicles and to be easily seen by the crews of taxiing aircraft when negotiating the aprons.

Airport buses have been in use since the 1960s, when nationalised operator British European Airways employed the archetypal London red AEC Routemaster buses in a blue and white livery with luggage trailers on service to Heathrow Airport.

== On airport transfer ==
Shuttle buses are used inside an airport to carry passengers between locations within an airport, including terminals, aircraft parking, car parks, etc.

=== Airside transfer ===
Airport buses (or apron passenger buses) are primarily used as a means of passenger transportation between airport terminals and remote aircraft parking positions. They may be operated by the airport authority, airline or a third party operator.

When a passenger aircraft parks at a remote stand due to a lack of jetbridges, or for long distance transfers or for reasons of safety, passengers will be transferred from the airport terminal arrival or departure gate to the aircraft using an airside transfer bus or apron bus. They are also used for airside transfers between airport terminals.

Airside transfer buses can be of normal municipal transit bus design, or due to not running on public rights of way, can be extra long and wide, to hold the maximum number of passengers. Sometimes a trailer bus is employed. Transfer buses are usually fitted with minimal or no seating, with passengers standing for the journey. Sometimes for larger aircraft a coach is used to ferry customers to or from the terminal as coaches hold more people. Transfer buses will usually be fitted with flashing beacons for operating airside near runways. They may also feature driving cabs at both ends.

Washington Dulles airport uses mobile lounges with a liftable passenger cabin for airside transfer; they work as a combination of an airside bus and a jet bridge.

There are two leading manufacturers of purpose built airport buses: Mallaghan from Northern Ireland and Cobus Industries.

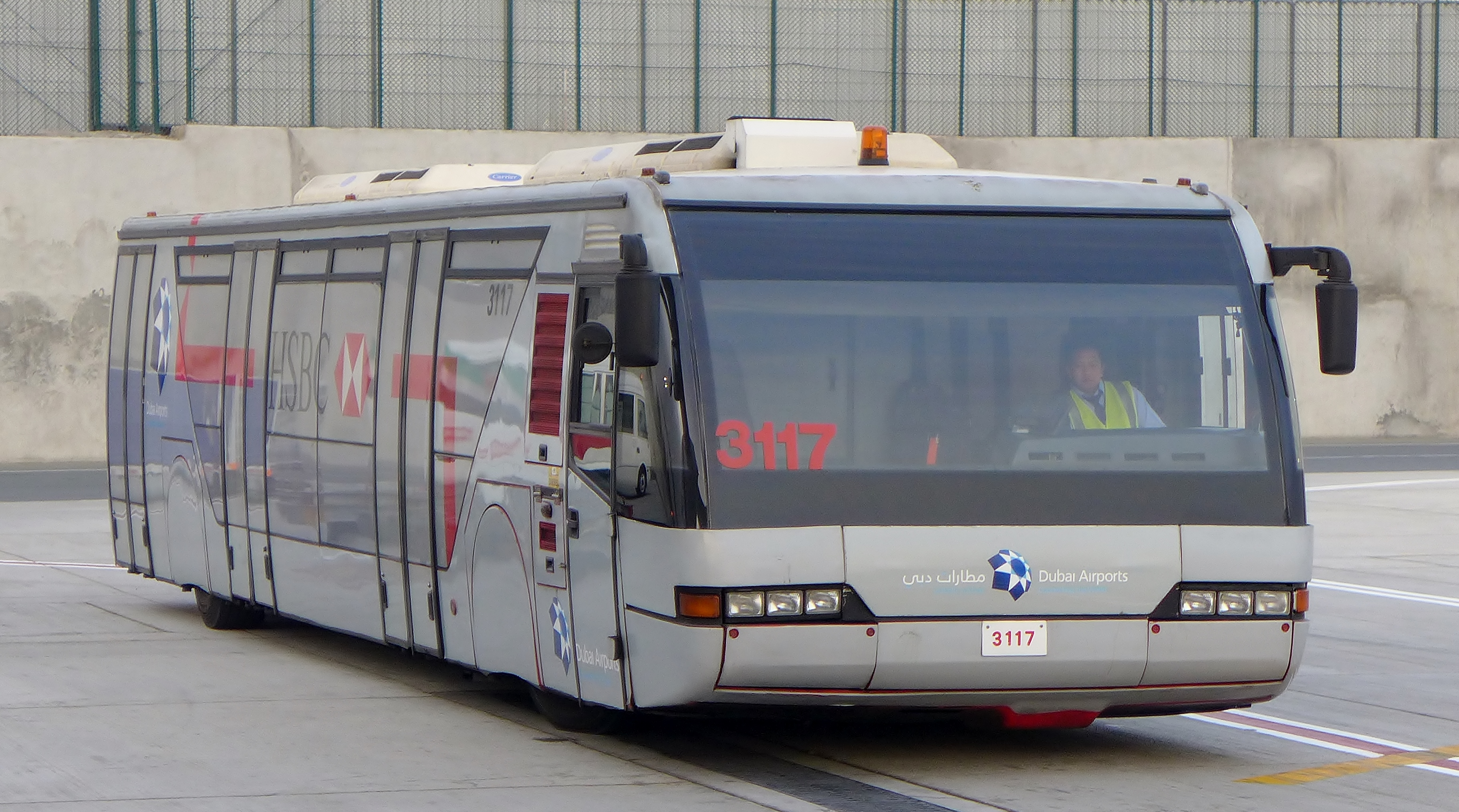
Neoplan Airliner airside transfer bus at Dubai International Airport

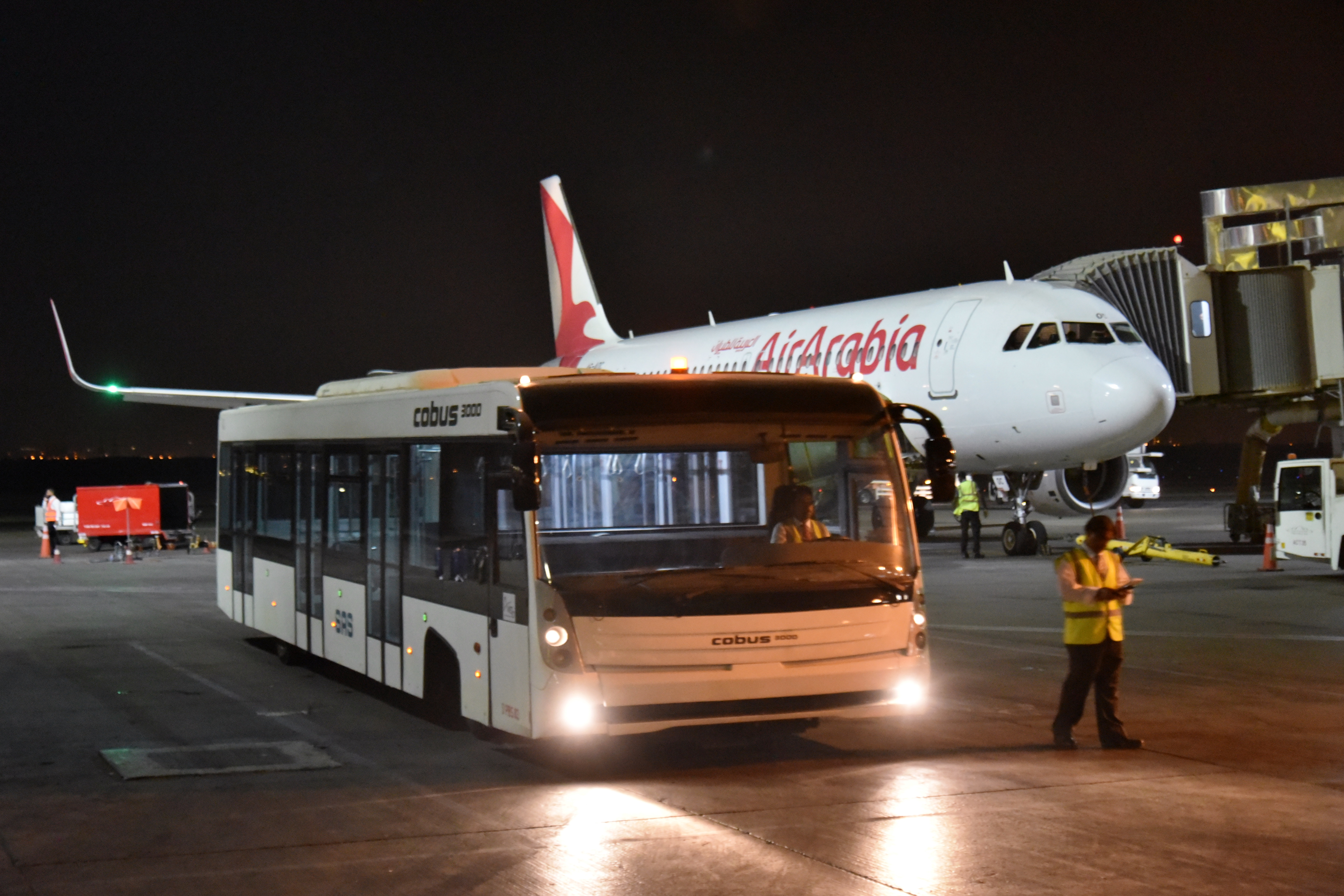
Cobus 3000 airside transfer bus at Sharjah International Airport

=== Terminal transfer ===
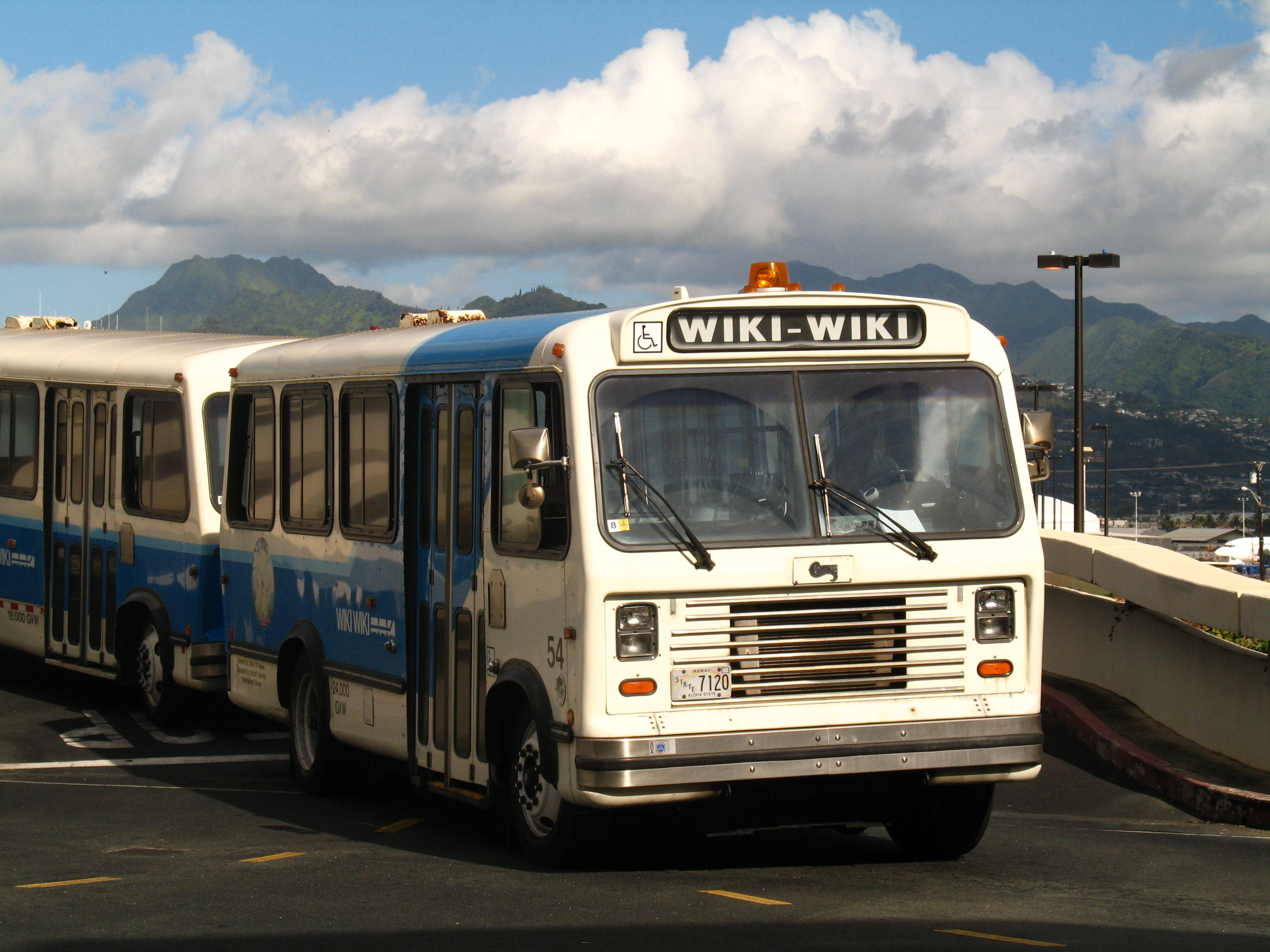
The Wiki Wiki terminal transfer bus at Honolulu International Airport.

In cases where the airport features multiple terminals which are far apart or not physically connected, and where there exists no people mover or other transfer alternative, a zero-fare transfer bus may be employed to transfer connecting passengers from one terminal to another Terminal transfer may also be incorporated into public transport bus networks.

=== Car park transfer ===
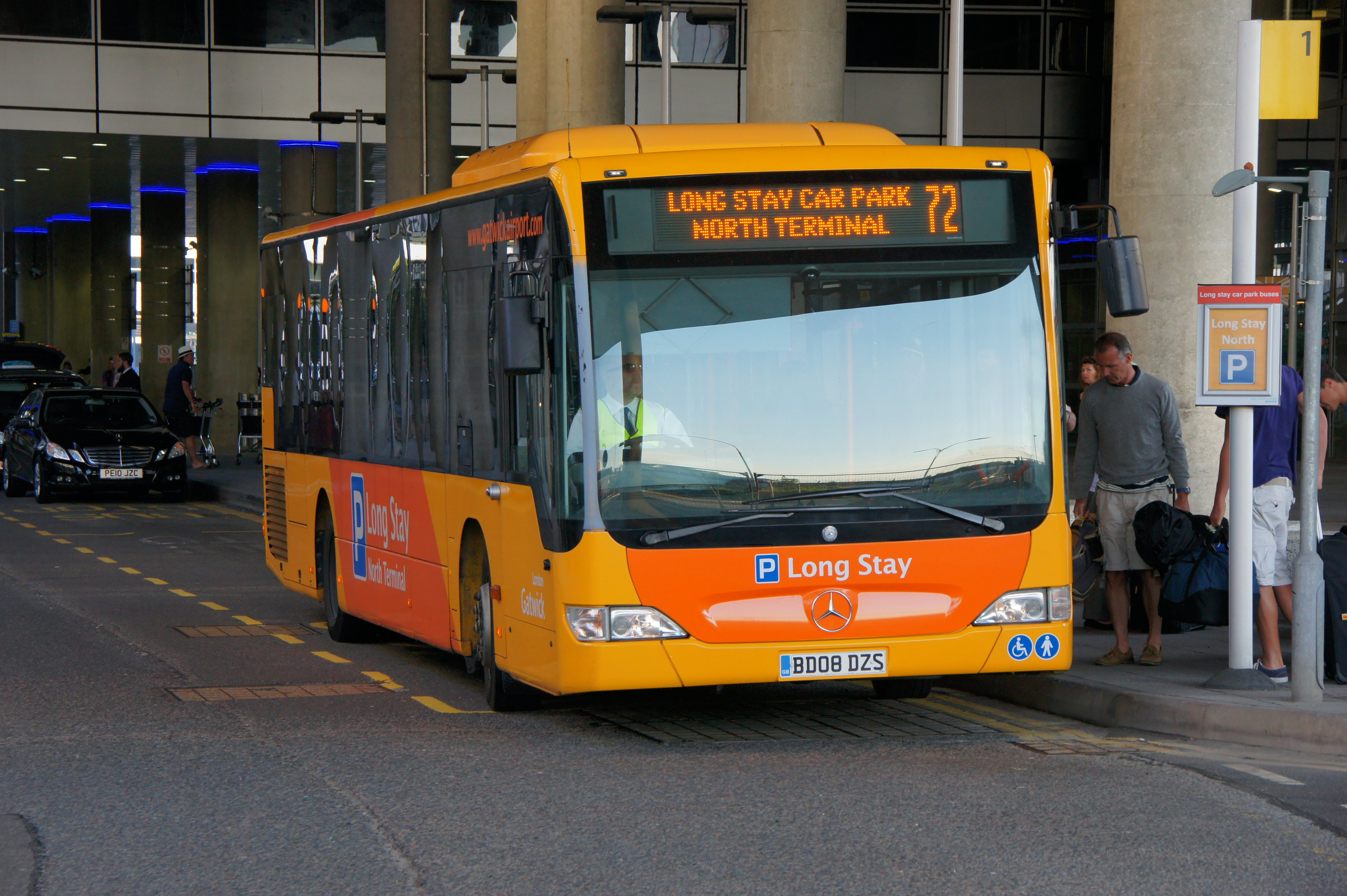
Car park transfer bus in the UK

In cases where the airport owned or affiliated car parks are large or relatively far from the terminal building, the airport owner or contractor may provide free car park shuttle buses making circular or shuttle runs between terminals and car park bus stands.

== Off airport transfer ==
Buses are also used to transport passengers between airports and other locations, which frequently include amenities targeting air passengers, for example, pick-up and drop off points near the airport terminal, and extra luggage space.

=== Shuttle services ===
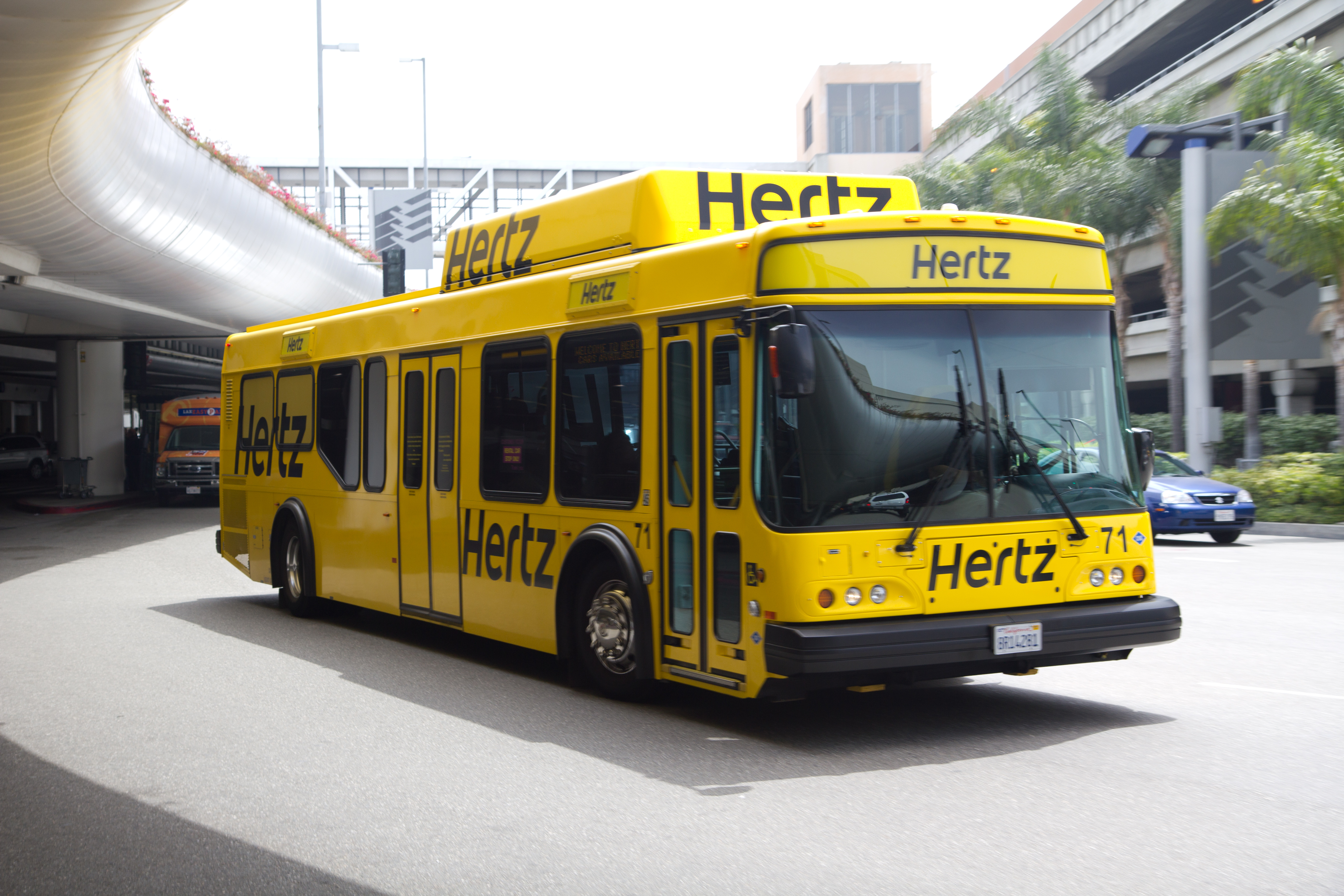
Hertz airport car rental shuttle

- Car park providers and car rental companies who provide cheap car-parking or store vehicles some distance from the airport often provide shuttle buses to transfer passengers. These can be anywhere from luxury coaches, full size buses or minibuses, sometimes fitted with luggage trailers.
- Airport hotels will often offer a complimentary airport bus service, to entice guests to stay at their property.

=== Flight replacement bus services ===
Some airlines operate bus services as part of their network to avoid flying short-haul flights, for example, Finnair operates bus services between Helsinki Airport and Turku / Tampere. These services carry a flight number and may only be available for airline passengers. Another example is United Airlines service from Beaumont Airport in Beaumont, Texas to Houston George Bush Intercontinental Airport in Houston, which used to be done on United Express SAAB 340 aircraft but which is now run on a bus.

=== Public bus services ===
Airport focused services which belongs to the regular public transport network can include the following:

==== Intermodal shuttle buses ====
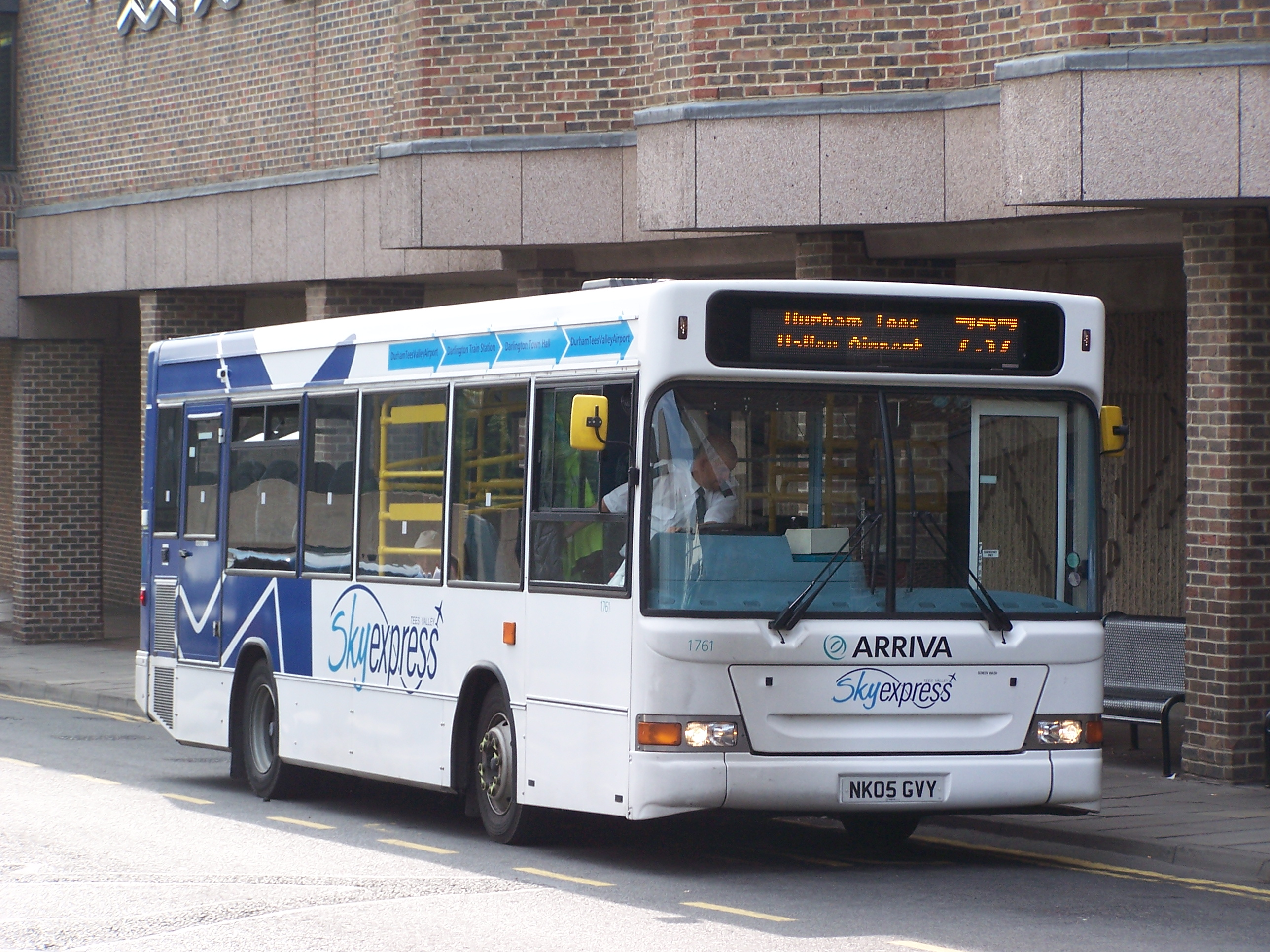
Free inter-modal shuttle bus for Durham Tees Valley Airport

Shuttle buses are used for airports which do not have a rail station onsite to connect the airport to a nearby railway station. These shuttle buses are usually with transit buses fitted for extra luggage space. These are usually sponsored by the airport or railway company, and through ticketing to the railway is usually available.

If the nearest station is in the city centre, the premium airlink service usually functions as the connecting bus for through rail ticketing.

In England, Durham Tees Valley Airport contracted Arriva North East bus company to provide a free shuttle bus for airport passengers.

Until 2023, railway operator Govia Thameslink Railway operated a fare-paying shuttle bus from Luton Airport Parkway railway station to Luton Airport, but this has since been replaced by an automated people mover transit line, Luton DART.

==== Premium airlink services ====
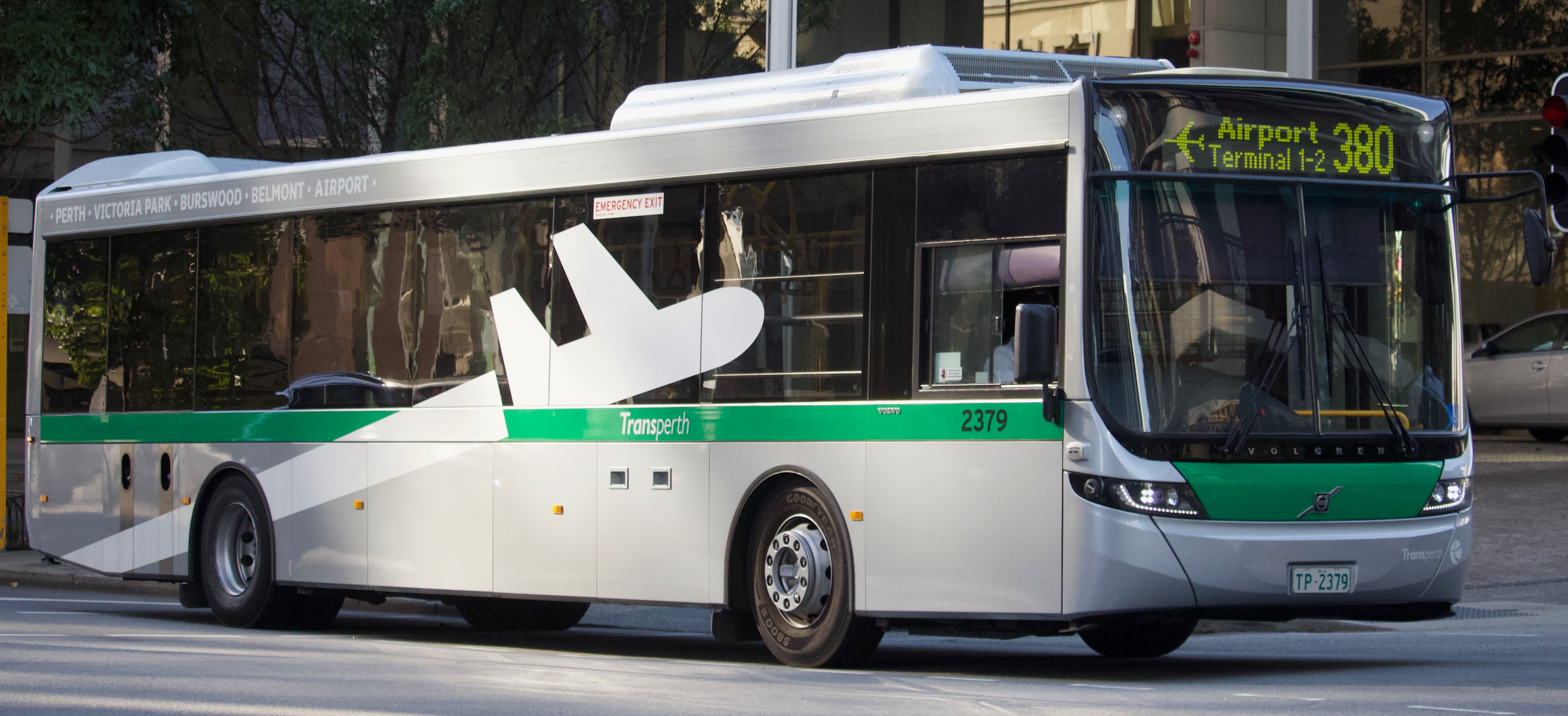
Premium airlink services

Bus companies that operate normal transit bus services often operate premium fare routes to an airport alongside their standard routes, using specially branded vehicles with extra luggage space. These routes are usually branded separately with distinctive route numbers, and they are usually limited stop, rather than point to point shuttle buses.

For example, Citybus operates a network of premium A-prefixed routes to Hong Kong International Airport using a fleet of buses with luxury seats and more luggage space, branded Cityflyer, alongside its standard E-prefixed routes which may or may not serve the airport. There are also A-prefixed routes serving the new Istanbul Airport, connecting various city locations, with a higher fare and coach vehicles compared to the IST-prefixed shuttle routes connecting the main railheads.

==== Demand responsive shuttle buses ====
Some public bus operators have moved into the demand responsive transport sector, bridging the gap between premium fixed route bus services and private hire airport taxicabs, incorporating an area in which the service can vary its route to pick up pre-booked passengers. Unlike private hire firms, these are still legally public buses. Examples include Dot2Dot from National Express, and the Edinburgh Shuttle operated by Lothian Buses, which feature high specification minibus based vehicles with luggage space.

==== Coach services ====
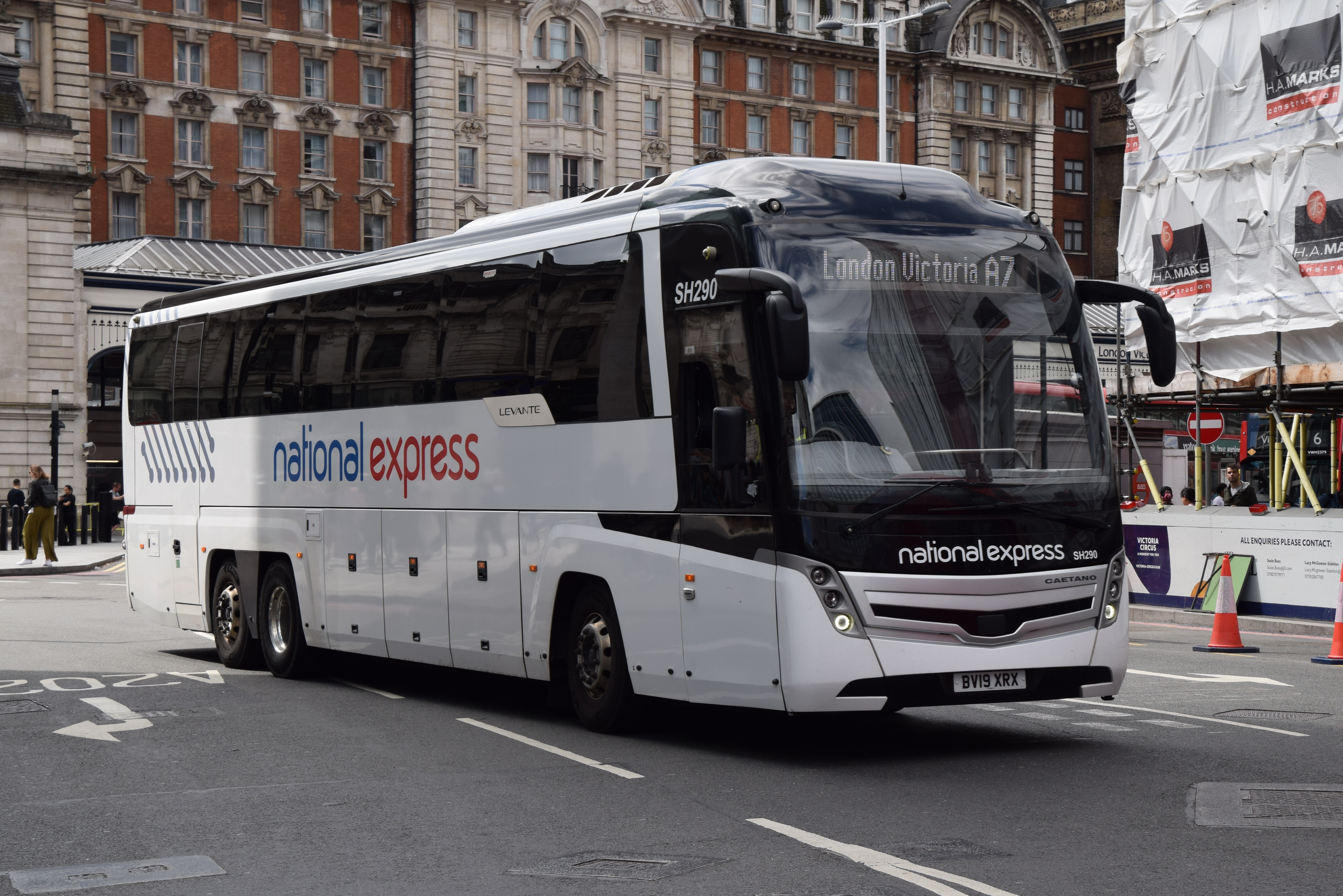
An express coach operated by National Express Coaches in the UK

Several long-distance express bus and coach operators make airports hubs of their service networks, such as National Express Coaches Airport services. These services do not necessarily use vehicles that have any extra modification beyond the standard express bus or coach specification, although they will usually carry a livery indicating the airport service, and special route numbers such as 747 (referencing the Boeing 747).

A specialist express bus operation is that of the likes of easyBus, that runs minibus services from stops in London direct to Luton Airport.

== Other non-airport bus services ==
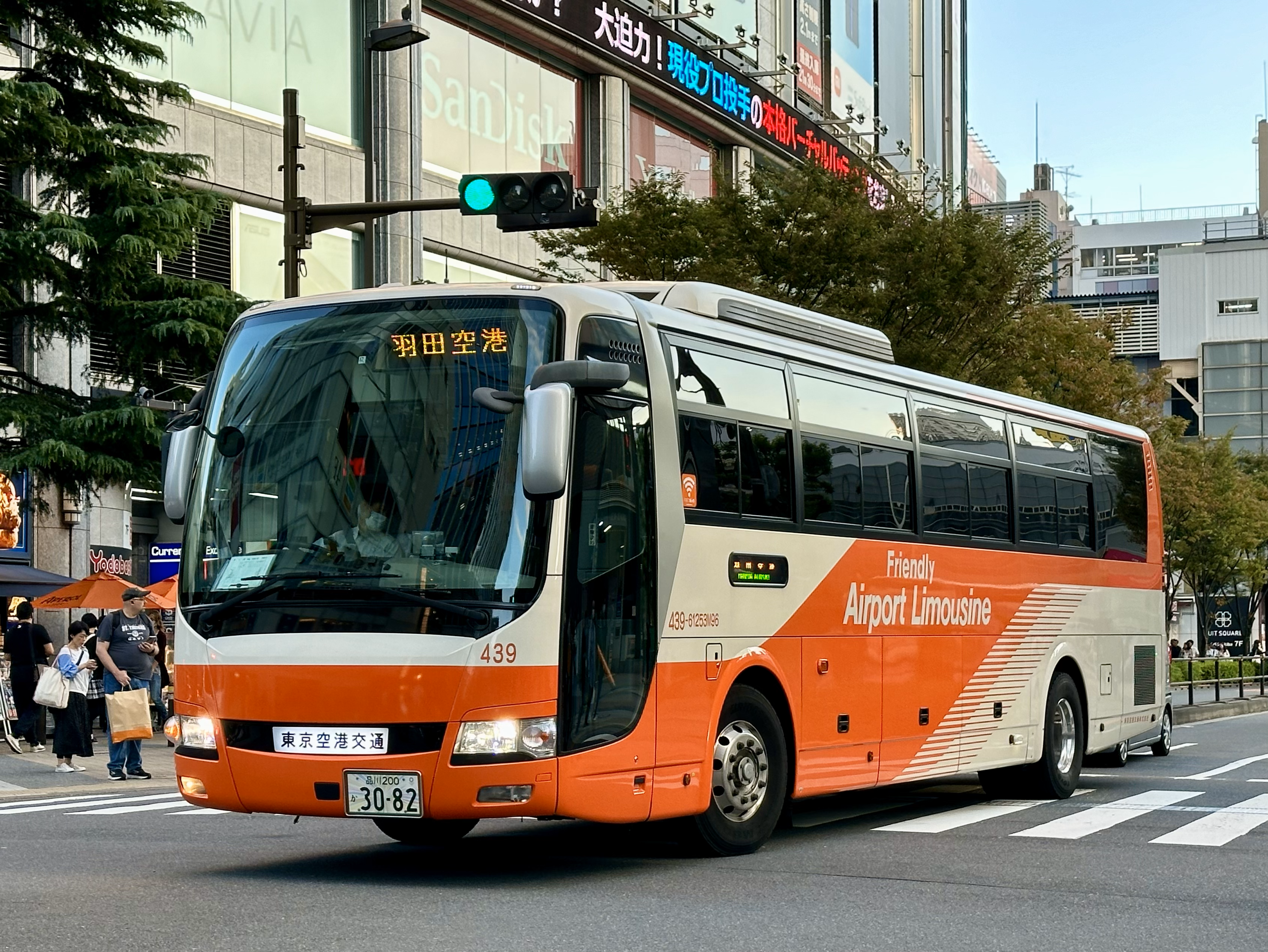
Private hire airport transfer service

=== Standard bus services ===
In addition to the specially equipped or liveried buses that help airports, several non-specific bus services may also stop or terminate at airports. These are often scheduled outside normal operating hours to serve the airport workers and passengers with unsociable flight times as well as normal passengers.

=== Private hire ===
Several private hire airport transfer companies, or airport focused taxicab operators, also use minibuses or minivans, to varying specifications, for transporting groups of people.

== See also ==
- Limousine
- List of buses
- Mobile lounge
- People mover
- Shuttle bus
