= Gate (airport) =

Area in airports that controls access to aircraft

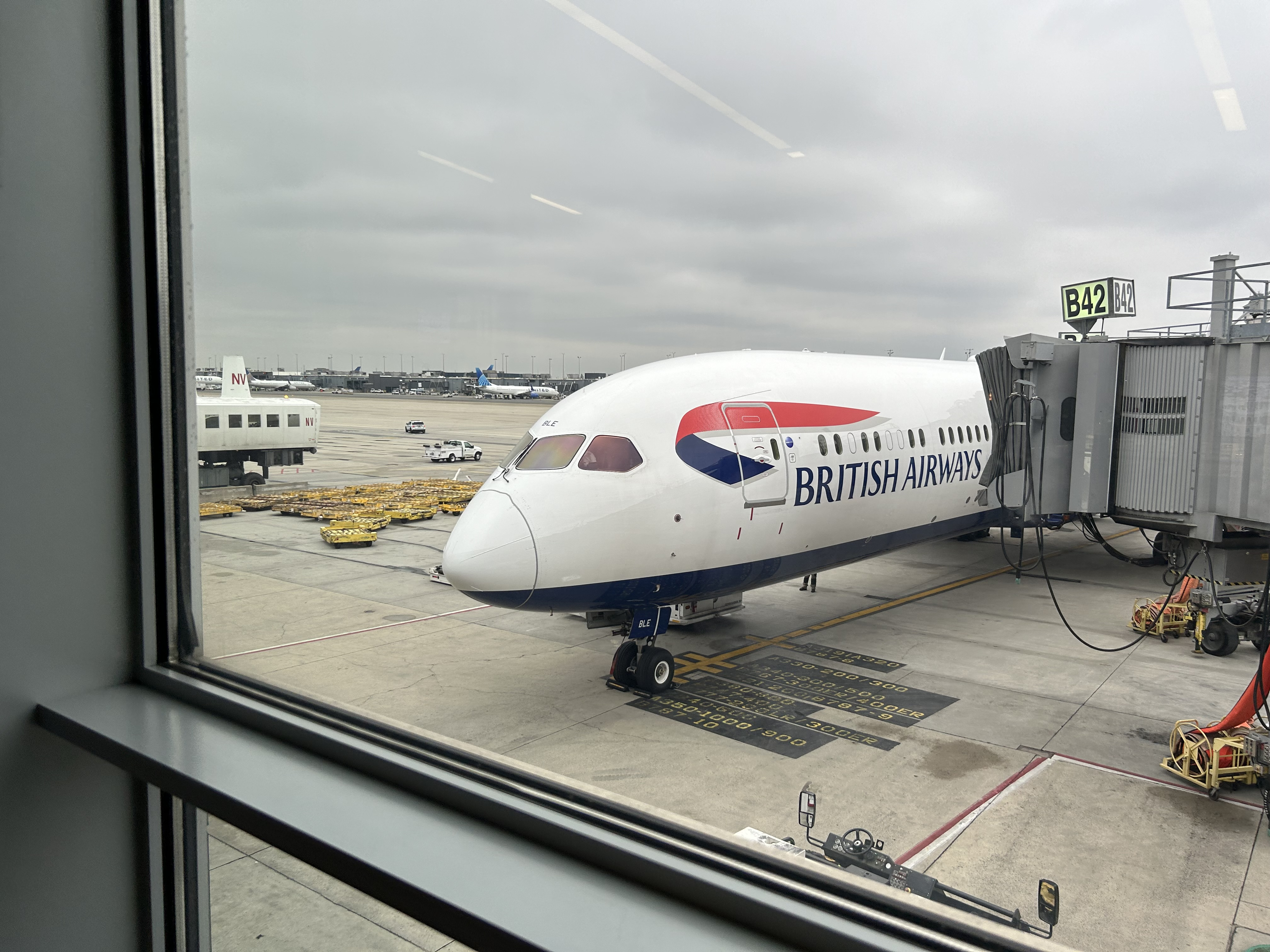
A Boeing 787-10 Dreamliner operated by British Airways after arriving at its gate at Washington Dulles International Airport. Visible on the ramp is a stopping point guide for airliners ordered by size.

A gate is an area in an airport terminal that controls access to a passenger aircraft. While the exact specifications vary from airport to airport and country to country, most gates consist of a seated waiting area, a counter and a doorway leading to the aircraft. A gate adjacent to the stand where the aircraft is parked may be a contact gate, providing access by way of a jet bridge, or a ground-loaded gate, providing a path for passengers to leave the building to board via mobile stairs or airstairs built into the aircraft itself. A remote stand serves an aircraft stand further away, providing access to ground transportation to move passengers between the gate and the stand, where they board via stairs.

Each gate typically corresponds to one parking stand on the airport's apron. A gate that provides access to multiple stands/jet bridges may have separate, designated doorways – sometimes termed sub-gates – for each stand. Commercial airport stands have airside components to facilitate passenger boarding and aircraft ground handling.

While the term gate precisely refers only to the point of access for passengers, and the area where the aircraft itself is parked is precisely termed an aircraft stand, in commercial passenger aviation the term gate is also used to refer to the gate and aircraft stand together as a single area.

== Gate agents ==
Gate agents work at the boarding gates of airports, assisting passengers in boarding their flights and in disembarking their flights.

== About ==
Shifts vary with the particular airline's flight schedule, and, like ticket agents, gate agents must wear uniforms and put on a pleasant face for the public. Agents have a variety of duties depending on the size of the airline, including making boarding announcements, assigning seats, handling standby passengers, monitoring jet way doors during boarding and disembarkation, and assisting in customer service duties.

Gate agents are able to see everything about each customer's flight ticket. They are able to tell how much someone paid for it, where it was bought, and when it was bought.

== Customs and immigration controls ==
=== United States ===
At most domestic gates, a single doorway connects the passenger waiting area with the jet bridge. International gates at U.S. international airports always have a second doorway to a separate corridor system that leads directly to the airport's U.S. Customs and Border Protection port of entry facility. For international arrivals from airports without preclearance, the door leading to the waiting area is closed and all arriving passengers are directed through the second doorway to CBP immigration and customs inspection.

== Jet bridge vs airstair ==
Before the era of the jet bridge or jetway, airline passengers embarked onto the aircraft from ground level via airstairs. If initially indoors, passengers would exit the waiting area through a door to the outside and then passengers would proceed to the airstairs leading to the aircraft door. This method is still used for boarding smaller planes, boarding at smaller airports, and during periods of peak demand at larger airports using remote stands with passengers driven from the terminal using airport buses when all jet bridges are in use.

== Ownership ==
The equipment is either airport or airline property, in most cases airport infrastructure.

== Gallery ==
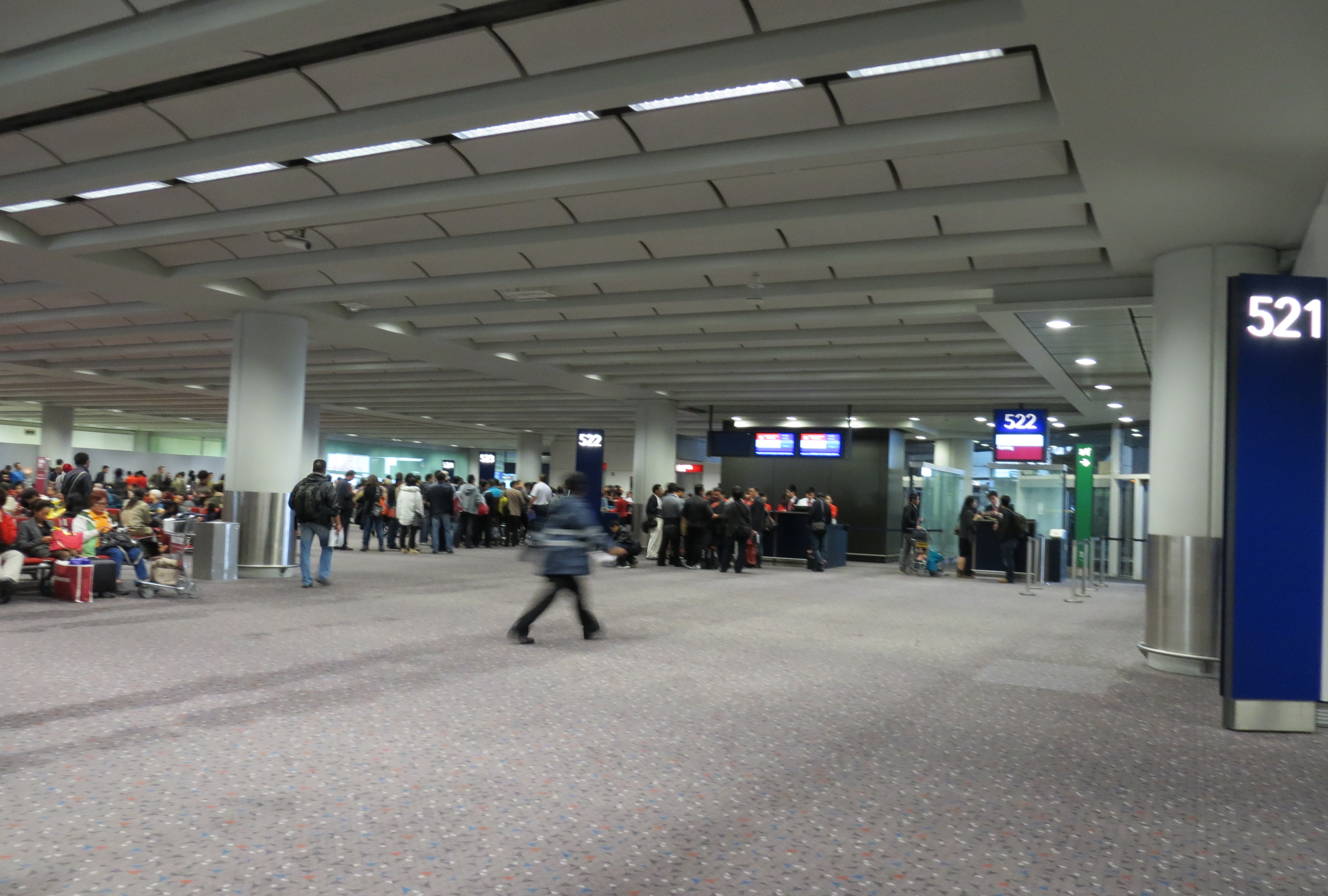
Gate 521 and 522 at Hong Kong International Airport

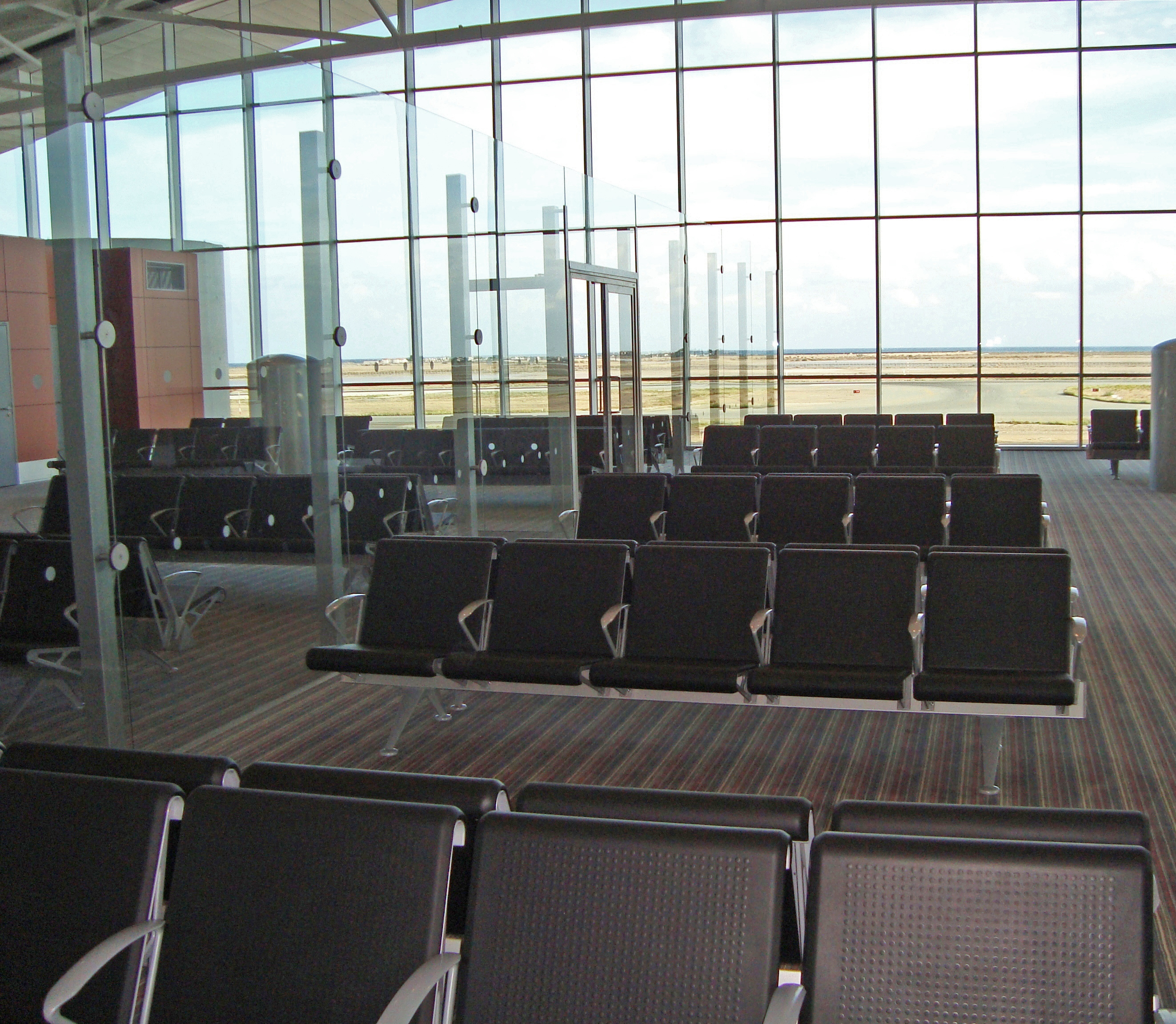
Gate at Larnaca International Airport

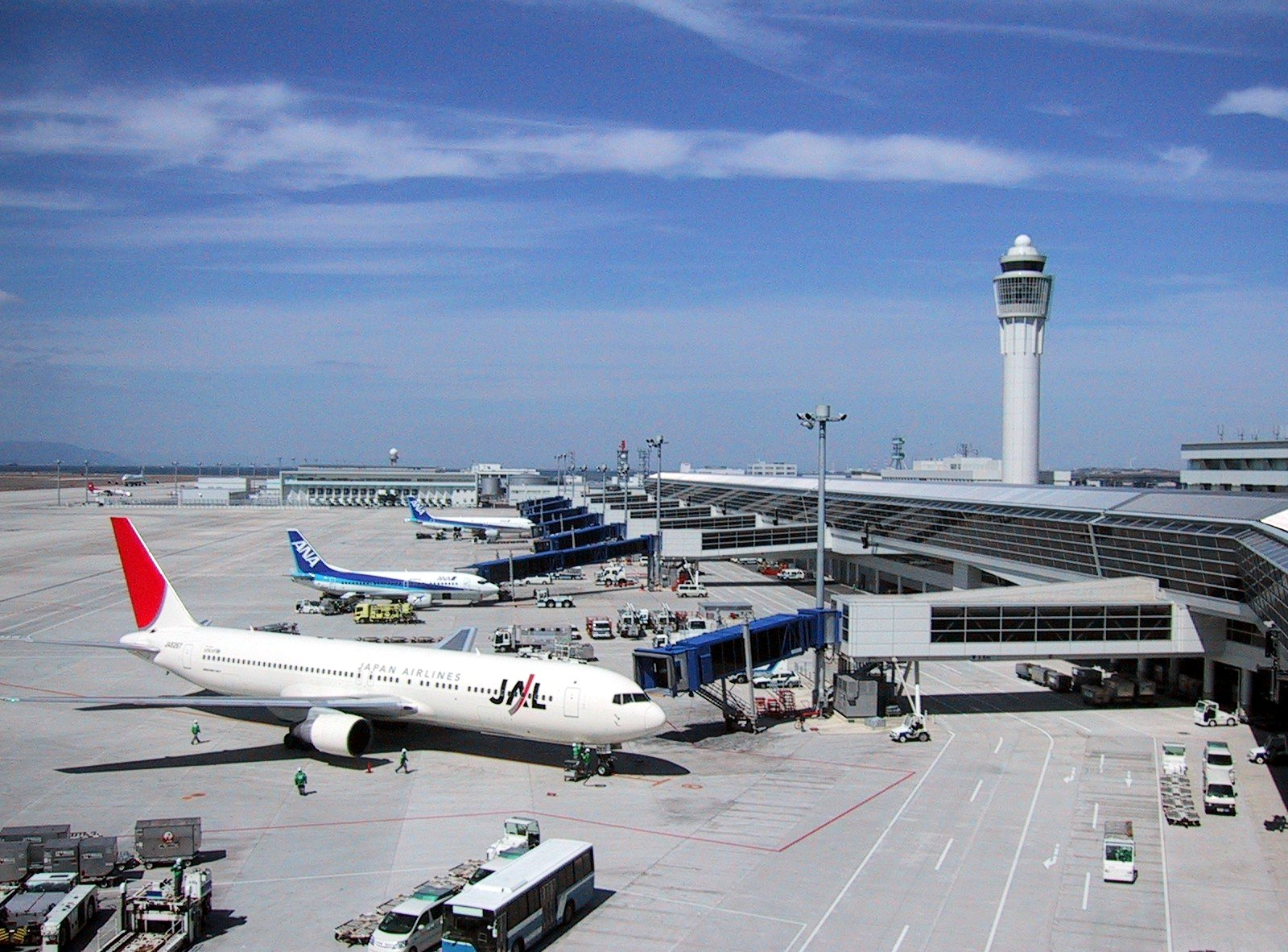
Gates at Chūbu Centrair International Airport

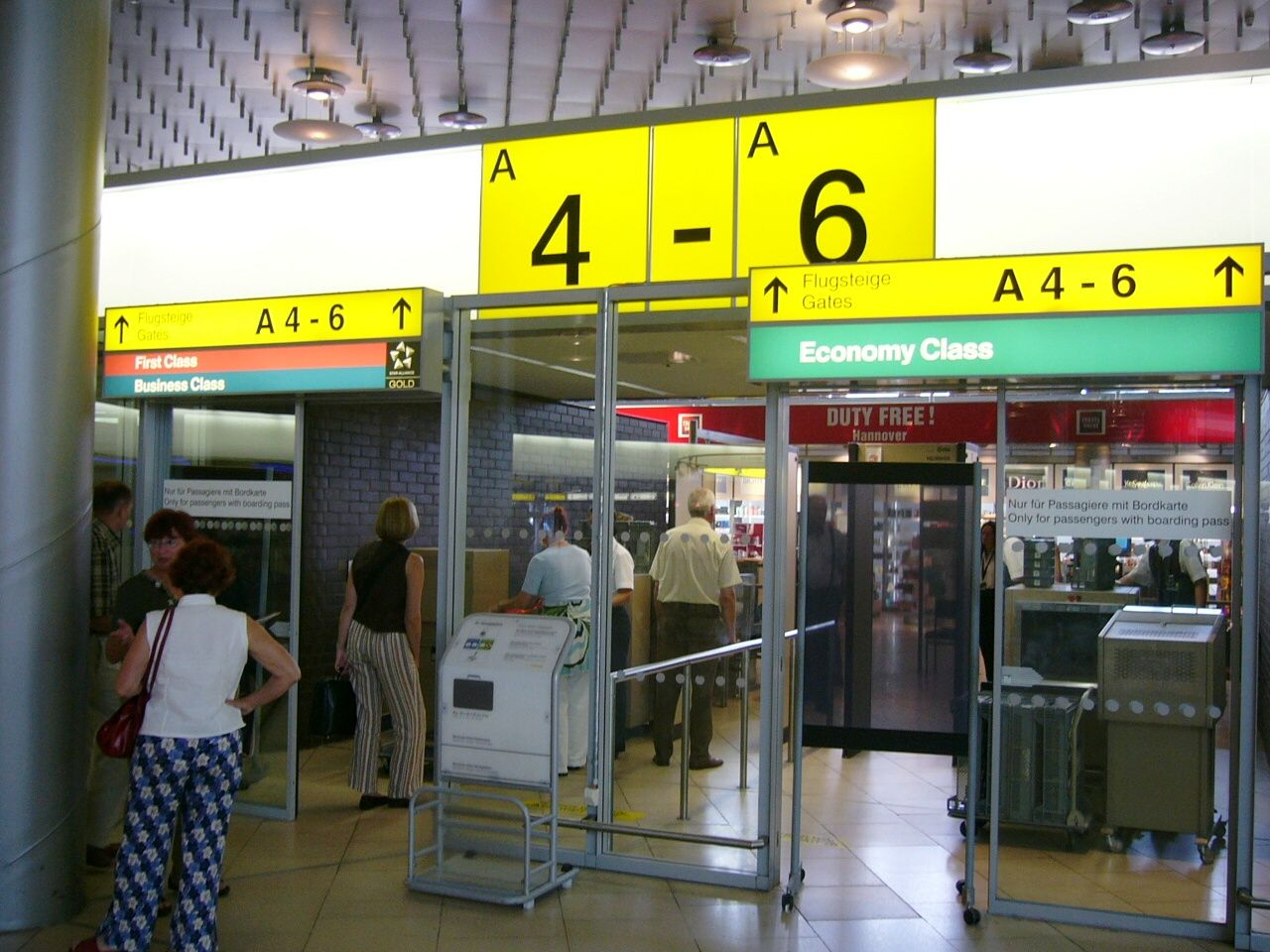
Entrance to gates at Hanover/Langenhagen International Airport

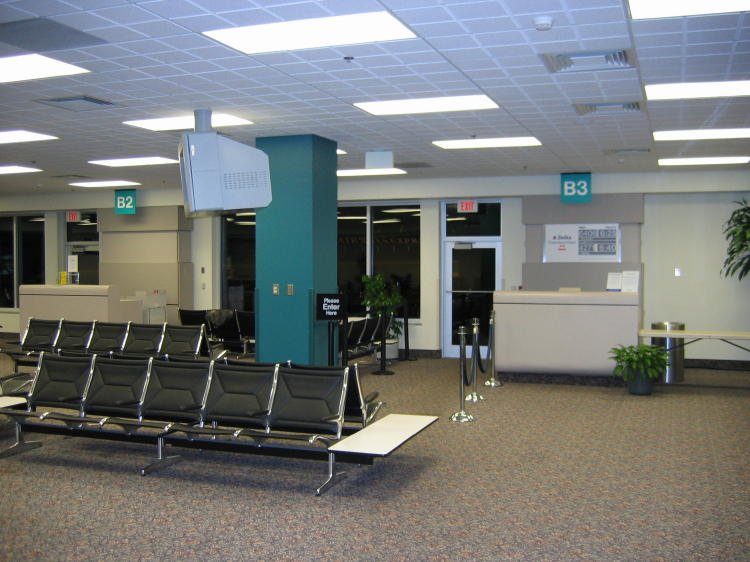
Gates B2 and B3 at Asheville Regional Airport

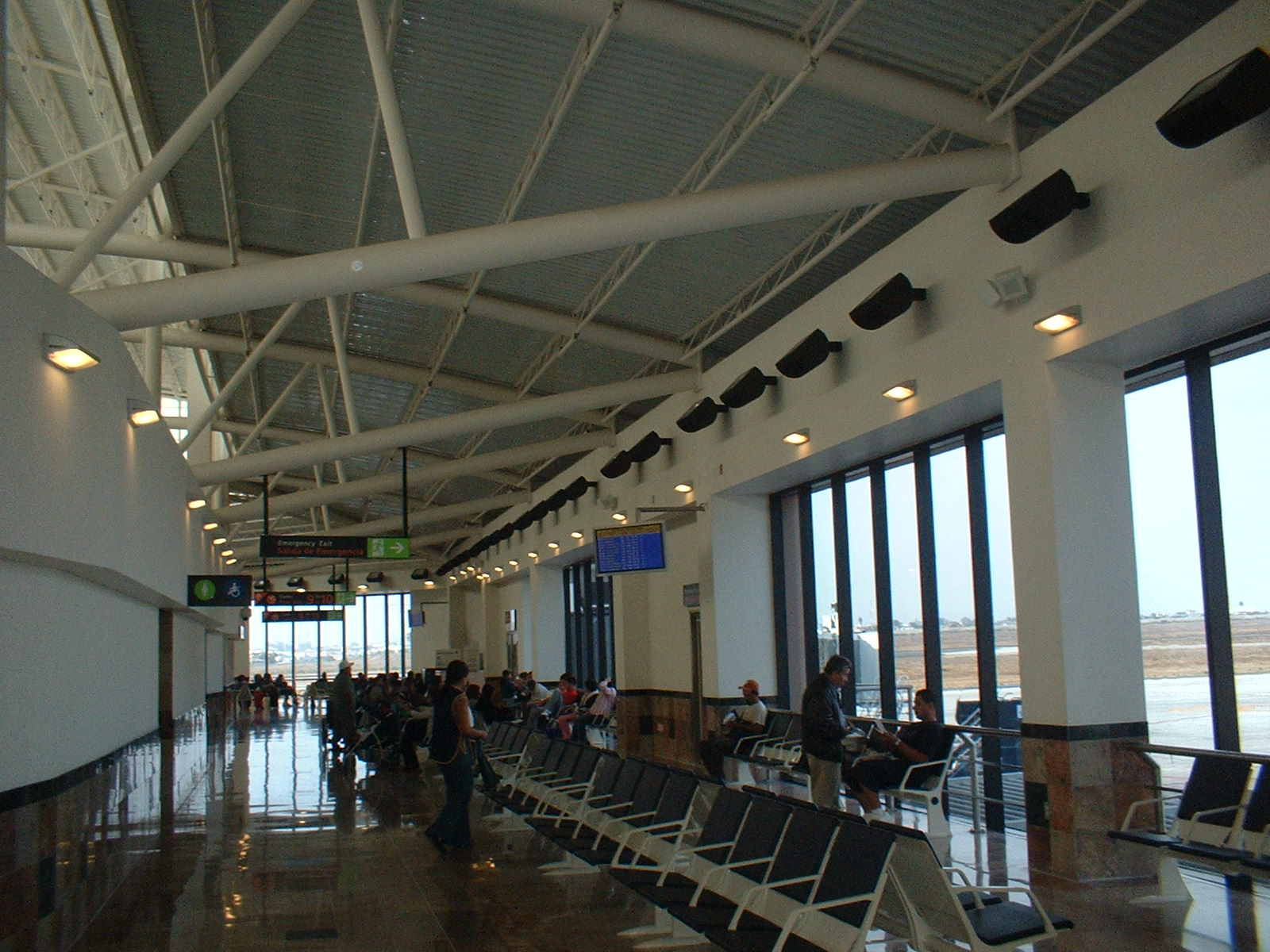
Gates at Tijuana International Airport

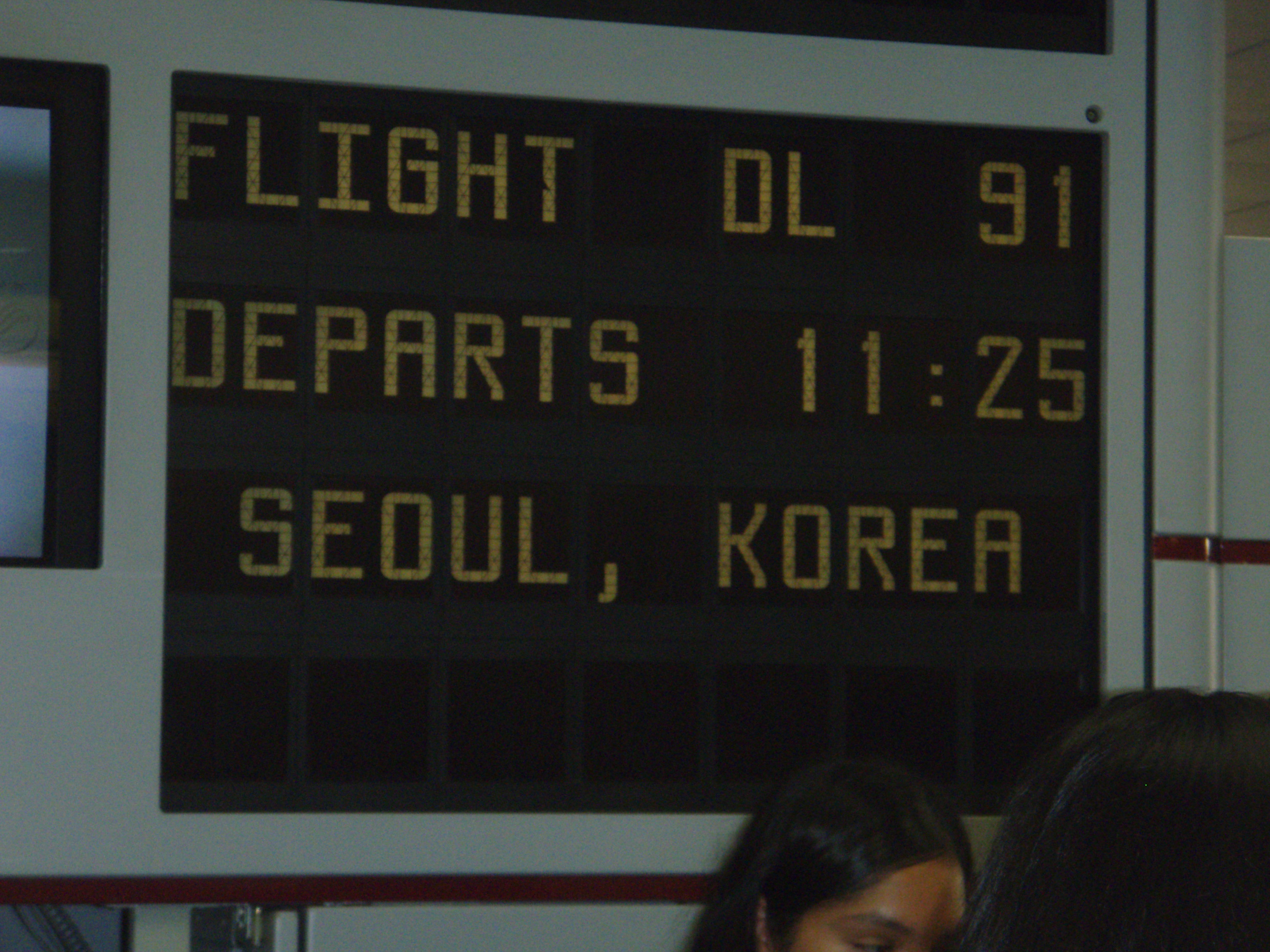
Sign at Gate E14 at Terminal E at Hartsfield–Jackson Atlanta International Airport

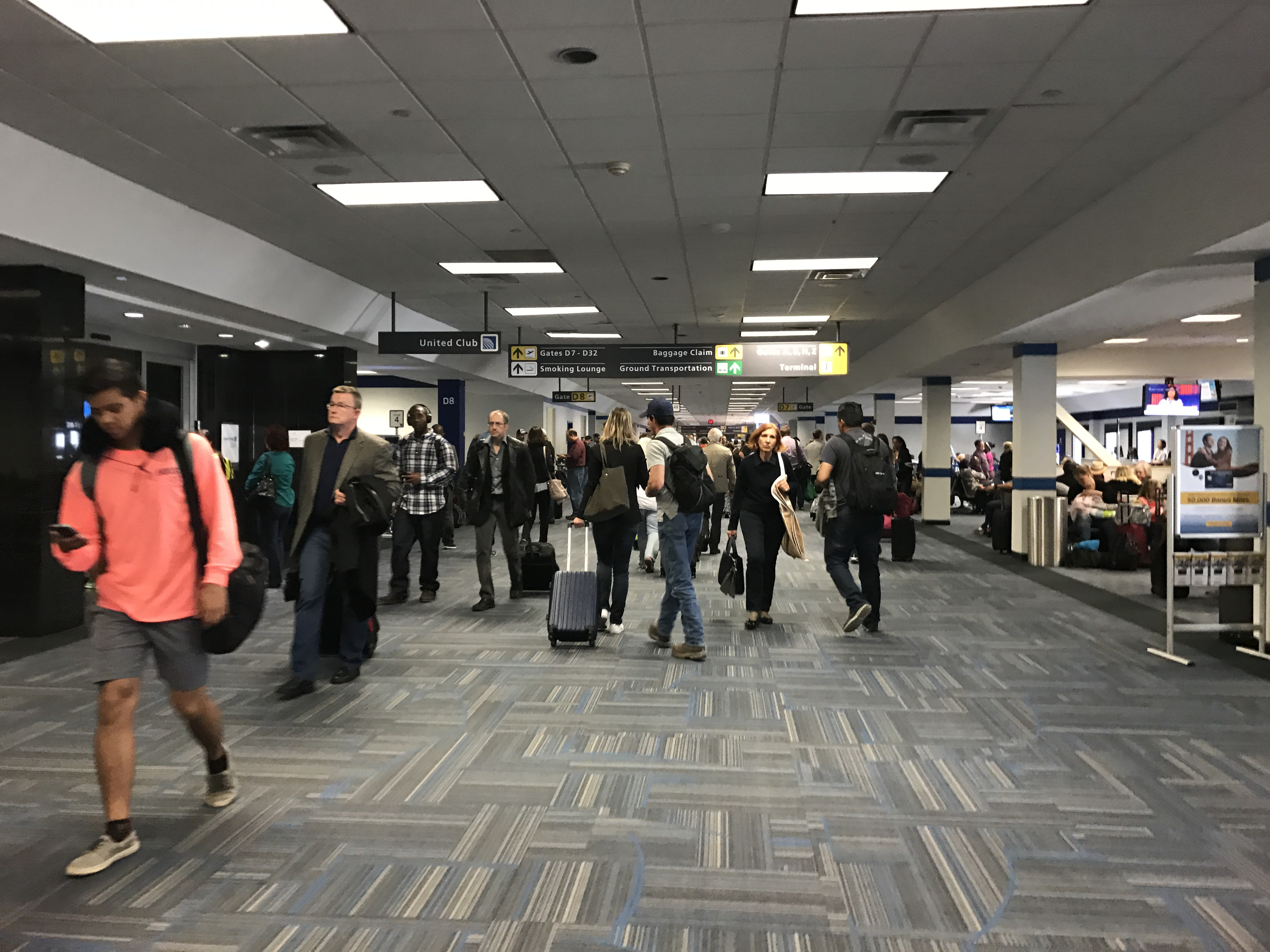
Gates in Concourses C and D of Washington Dulles International Airport

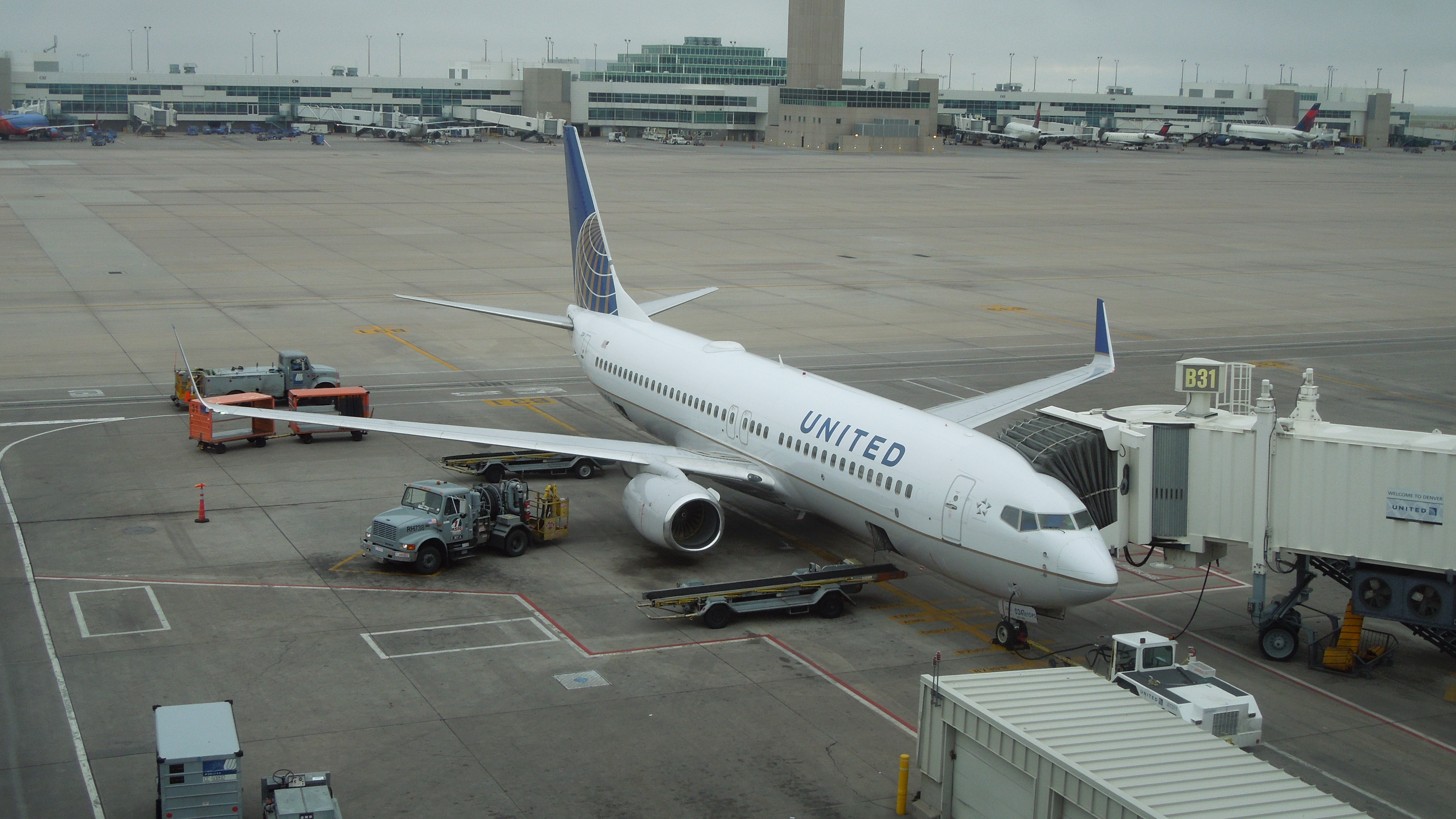
A United Airlines gate B31 in Concourse B at Denver International Airport

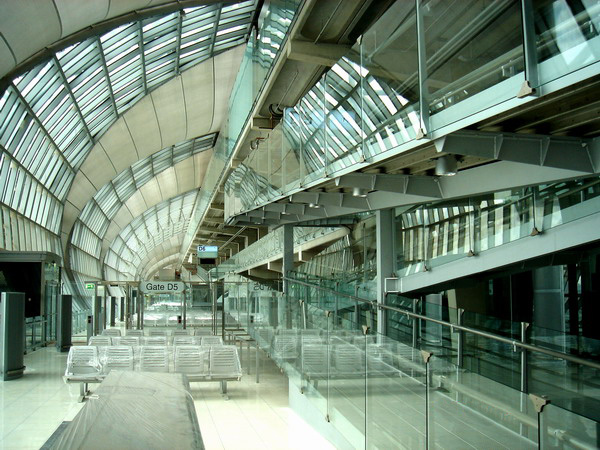
Gate D5 in Concourse D at Suvarnabhumi Airport in Bangkok, Thailand

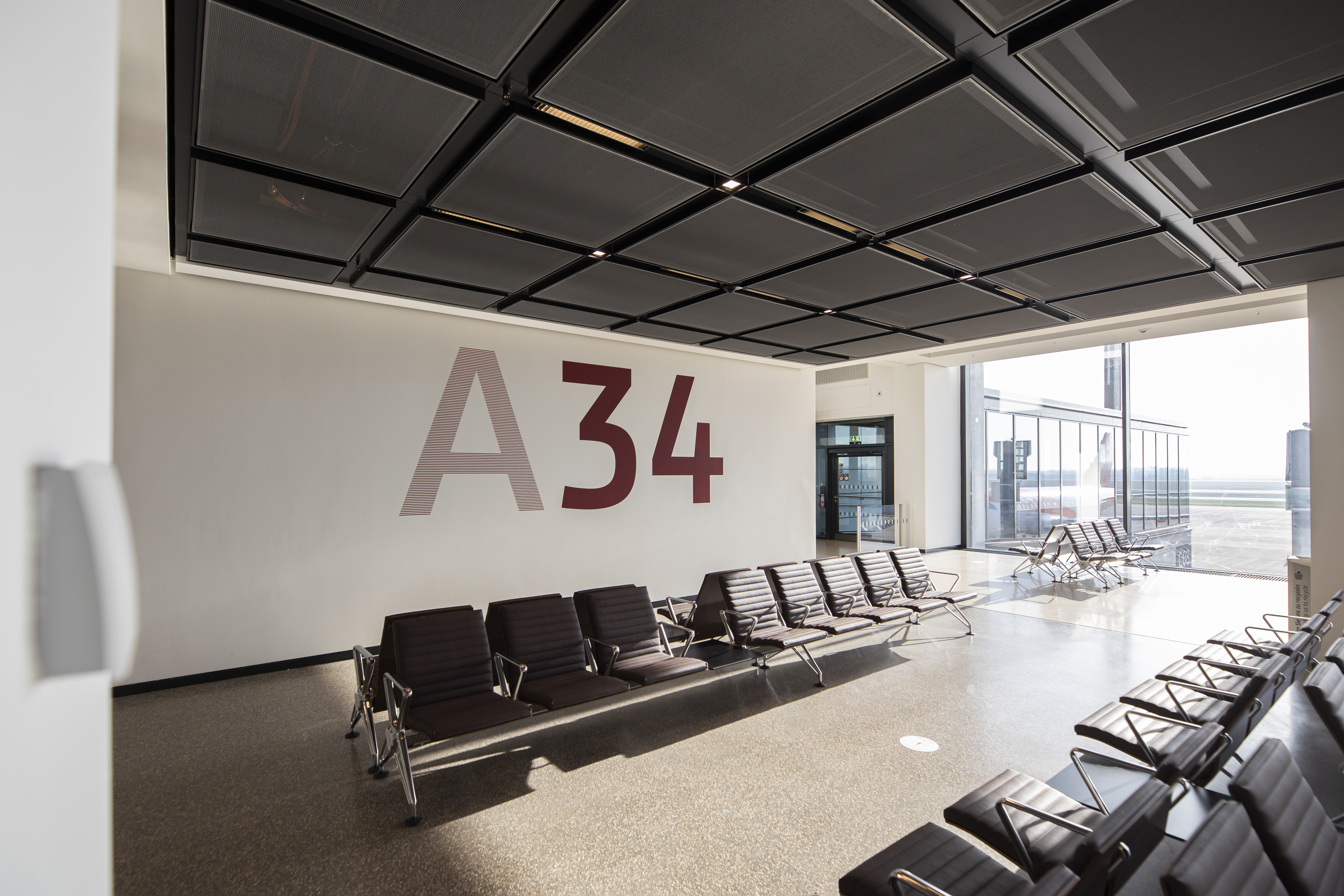
Gate A34 at Berlin-Brandenburg Airport

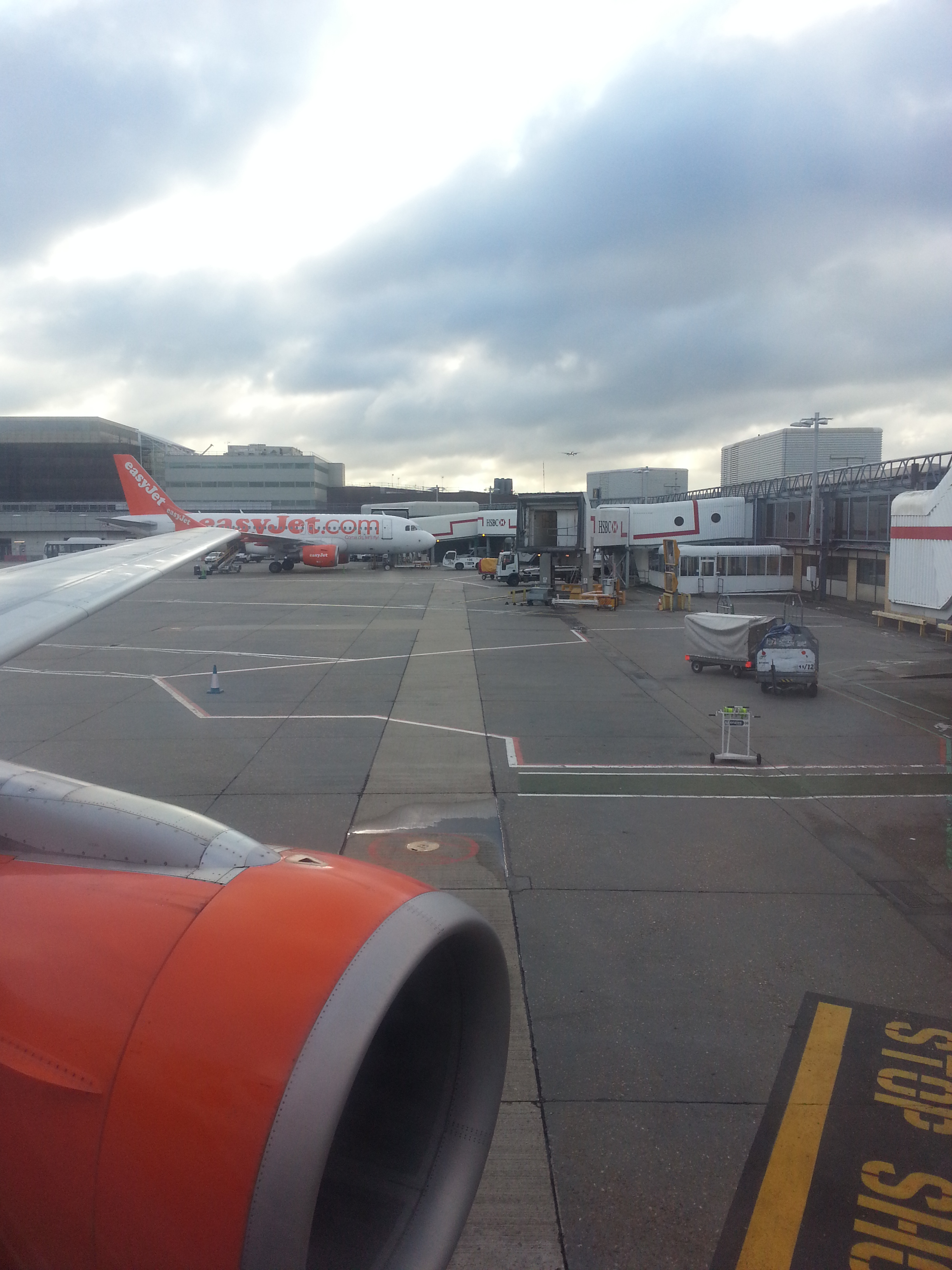
EasyJet at gate, at Gatwick Airport

Royal Air Maroc at gate Marseille Provence Airport
