= Cobus Industries =

German manufacturer of airport buses

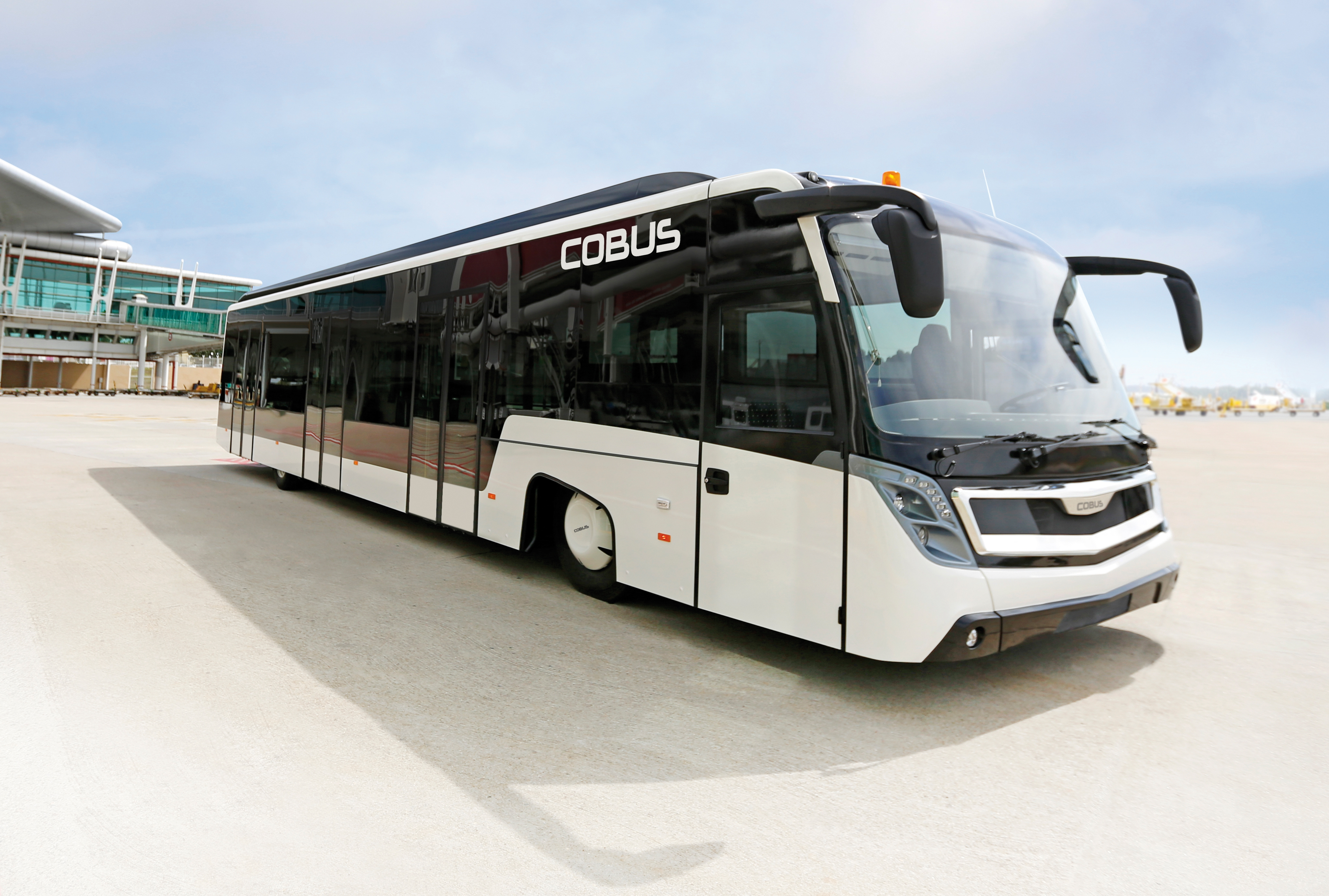
- Cobus 3000
- Type: Gmbh
- Industry: Airport Bus
- Founded: 1990
- Headquarters: Wiesbaden, Germany
- Key people: Patricia Vasconcelos (CEO), Andreas Funk (Chief Commercial Officer)
- Products: Diesel, Electric & Fuel Cell Powered Airport Bus
- Website: http://www.cobus-industries.com

COBUS Industries is a brand of apron buses for airside transfer at airports manufactured by Salvador Caetano and distributed by COBUS Industries, based in Wiesbaden, Germany.

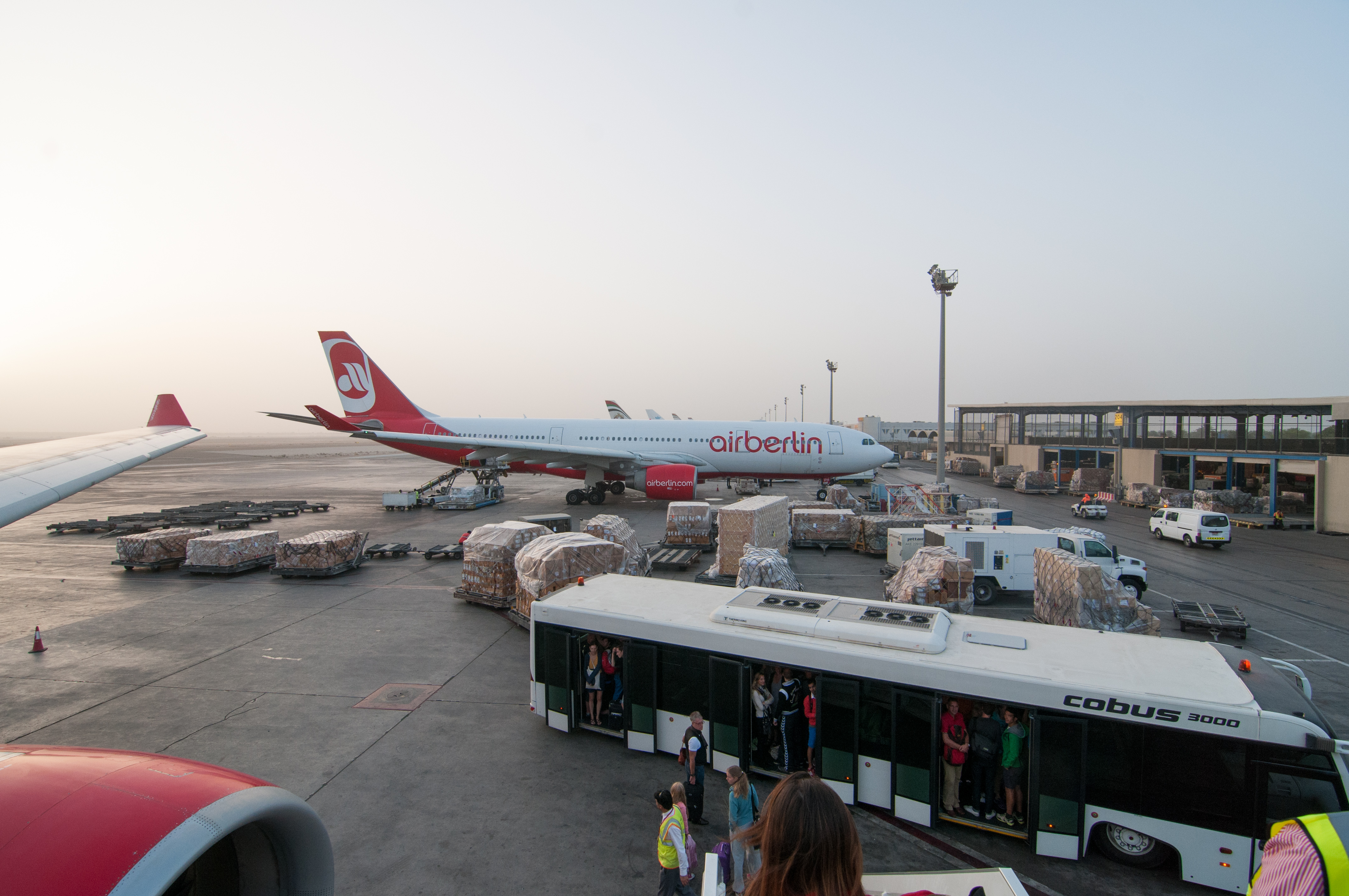
A 3000 series on the cargo apron of Abu Dhabi Airport

== Orders and trials ==
=== 2010s ===
In the United Arab Emirates, Dubai-based Emirates made a purchase of 128 buses in November 2018 with them to be fully in service by 2020.

=== 2020s ===
In the United Kingdom, Bristol Airport announced in September 2021 they were trialling an electric airport bus to ferry passengers from the gates to the aircraft on the apron field. The vehicle being trialled is claimed by the company to have a capacity of 110 passengers. Later in November 2021, Glasgow Airport trialled the eCOBUS at their airport, initially deployed to assist moving delegates and support staff during the COP26 summit.

More electric bus trials were announced in August 2022 when Birmingham-based National Express partnered with Stansted to trial the company's electric powered COBUS 2700 with a maximum capacity of 88 passengers.

A year later in September 2022, Cobus announced the launch of the electric-powered Vega at the GSE Expo Europe in Paris, France, with a maximum width of 3 and passenger doors on both sides of the bus, as well as its fuel cell Hydra bus, with a range of 400 kilometres.

In May 2023, The Aruba Airport Authority in Aruba made a purchase of an electric powered COBUS 3000.

== Products ==
- COBUS 3000
- COBUS 2700S (diesel)
- eCOBUS
- (electric)
- COBUS Vega (electric)
- COBUS Hydra (fuel cell)

== See also ==
- Ground support equipment
