= Mallaghan =

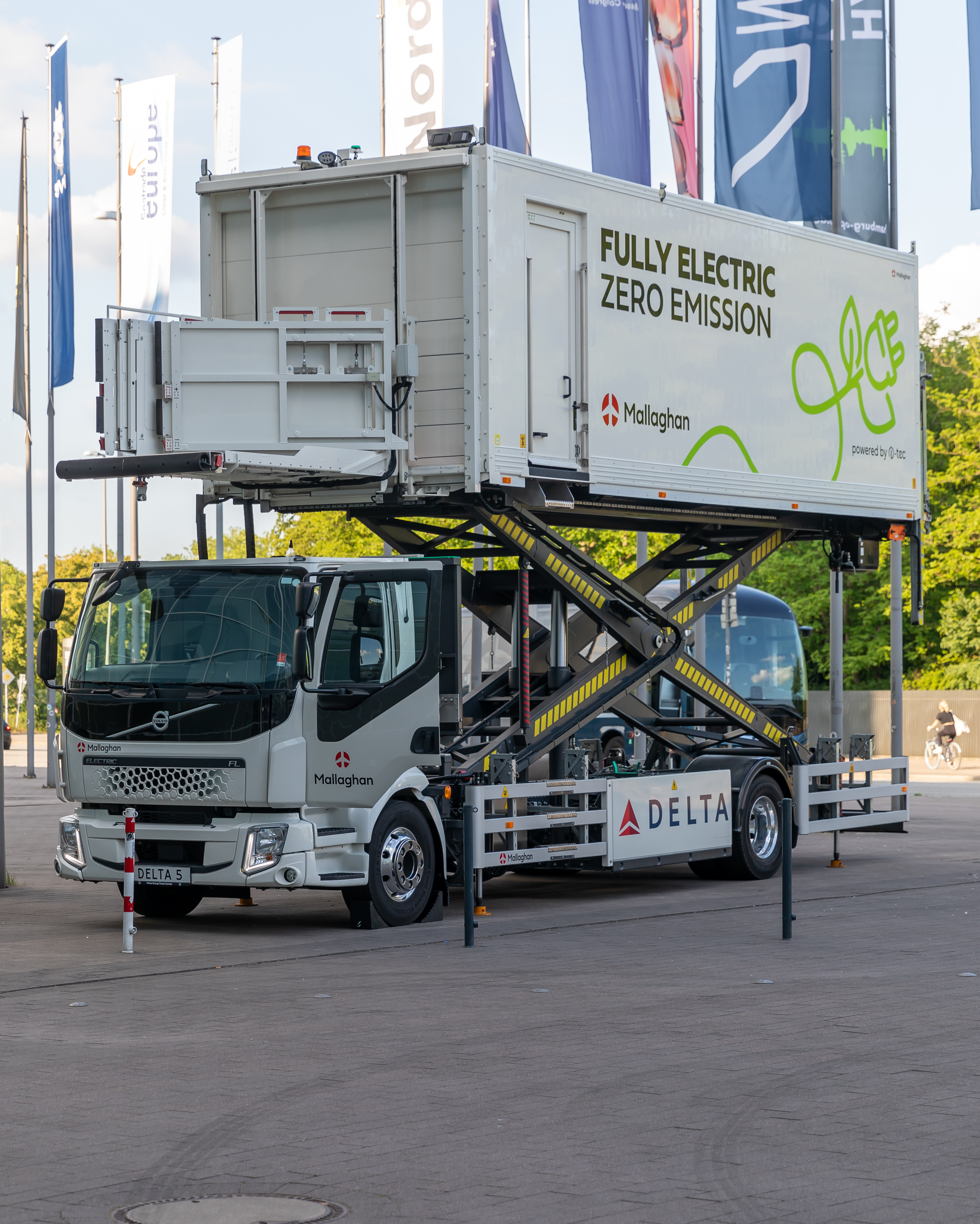
Battery powered aircraft catering truck by Mallaghan

Mallaghan (also Mallaghan Engineering and Mallaghan GSE) is a British manufacturer of aviation ground support equipment based in Dungannon, Northern Ireland.

The company was founded by Terry Mallaghan in the 1960s and was originally a civil engineering company. In 2020 it employed 450 people.
