= Nightstar (train) =

Proposed Channel Tunnel rail service

The Nightstar was a proposed overnight sleeper train service from various parts of the United Kingdom to destinations in mainland Europe, via the Channel Tunnel, in the mid 1990s. To run alongside the Eurostar, and north of London day-time Regional Eurostar services which were never operational, the Nightstar was the last part in a proposed round-the-clock passenger train utilisation of the Channel Tunnel.

The Nightstar service was to have been operated by European Night Services, a company mostly owned by European Passenger Services (the then-named operator of the Eurostar service).

After rejection of various British ideas for the service that was to become the British Rail Class 373 Eurostar train—which eventually was created from the existing French TGV scaled for a British loading gauge—the Nightstar concept emerged as an individual locomotive-hauled passenger train. While some carriages were built, the project was cancelled in July 1997 for lack of commercial viability. All of the stock was eventually sold to Via Rail in Canada, forming its Renaissance train fleet.

== Rolling stock ==
The trains were to use equipment based on the British Rail Mark 4 coaches modified for long-distance service. All the cars were air-conditioned with power operated doors and designed to meet the safety standards of each country they would run through, the most stringent of these requirements being for the Channel Tunnel. A fleet of 139 cars was ordered, broken down as 47 seated cars, 72 sleeper cars and 20 service vehicles. The cars would have normally been configured as 9 seven-car and 9 eight-car sub-sets, with four spares (two seated cars and two service vehicles). The trains would have run as either individual sub-sets (for beyond London services and to some European destinations), or as two sets coupled together (from London and through the Tunnel). As the trains were designed to run as fixed formation sub-sets, only the two outer ends of each sub-set had buffers and draw gear. The sub-sets would have been configured as follows:

Seven-car sub-sets, for services beyond London:

- Three seated cars
- Service vehicle
- Three sleeper cars

Eight-car sub-sets, for London services:

- Two seated cars
- Service vehicle
- Five sleeper cars

Each seated car had 50 reclining seats in a 2+1 configuration across the aisle, with room for luggage underneath. Each sleeper car had 20 beds, split over 10 cabins (two per cabin). All cabins had an en-suite toilet and basinette, while six cabins had an en-suite shower. The beds could be folded into the wall to provide seating. The service vehicle had bench style seating for 15 passengers in a lounge area, a catering area, large luggage area and staff accommodation in the centre, and a large cabin with two beds, designed to be accessible to wheel chair users, at the other end. The seated area would have been coupled to the seated cars and the cabin end to the sleeper cars.

Testing commenced on the East Coast Main Line between Doncaster and Darlington in August 1996 with a Class 90.

== Locomotives ==
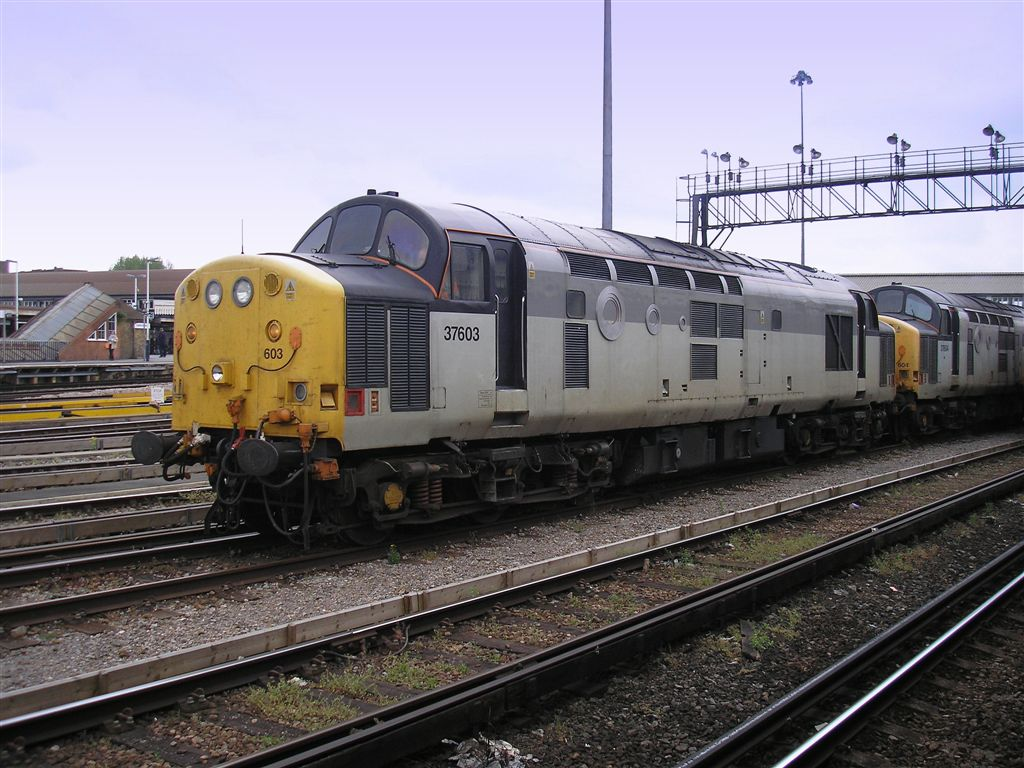
Class 37/6s at Clapham Junction station in May 2007

=== Electric ===
==== British Rail Class 92 ====
On electrified lines the services were to be hauled by British Rail Class 92 locomotives. These locomotives were built and designed as multipowered electric units for this role as well as hauling Channel Tunnel freight services. They are dual-voltage locomotives able to operate on 750 V DC third rail lines (as in the South-East of England) and 25 kV AC lines (for beyond London, through the Channel Tunnel and in Europe). Seven (020, 021, 032, 040, 044–046) were allocated to European Passenger Services. After the service was cancelled, they were placed in store. All were eventually sold to GB Railfreight. Some were returned to service after over 15 years in store.

==== SNCF Class BB 36000 ====
This class was designed as mixed-use locomotive, and were to be used on Nightstar services. The first 30 locomotives of Class BB 36000 were built as a result of a modification of an order for 264 of the dual voltage SNCF Class BB 26000 (Sybic); instead only 234 Sybics were built, the last 30 of the order were instead built as a triple voltage design capable of also operating under 3 kV DC.

The locomotives were given the name Astride, derived from Asynchrone Tri-system Drive Engine, the external design was by MDB design. Sixty locomotives were delivered between 1997 and 2002; numbered BB36001 to BB36060. BB36001 to BB36030 received a red livery, and were primarily used for trains to Belgium. The remainder received a green freight livery, and were mainly used for trains to Italy.

In July 2010 the locomotives numbered 36001 to 36030 were transferred to SNCF's rolling stock leasing subsidiary Akiem.

=== Diesel ===
==== British Rail Class 37 ====
On non-electrified routes Nightstar services would have been hauled by a diesel engine. When first proposed British Rail intended to obtain these locomotives as part of a larger order for a new class of diesel locomotive. This order was not forthcoming so a tender was put out for the six locomotives required. However the cost of such a small order of locomotives was excessively high so the decision was taken to use pairs of refurbished Class 37 locomotives, drawn from the class 37/5 subclass, instead. Twelve were selected and refurbished at Doncaster Works and renumbered as the 37/6 subclass. The refurbishment included a full overhaul, re-gearing to allow 80 mph running, fitting with multiple working capabilities, and through wiring for electric train supply, (ETS) used for powering services in the coaches such as air conditioning. Some were retained by Eurostar for use as rescue locomotives, all were eventually sold to Direct Rail Services.

==== Generator van ====
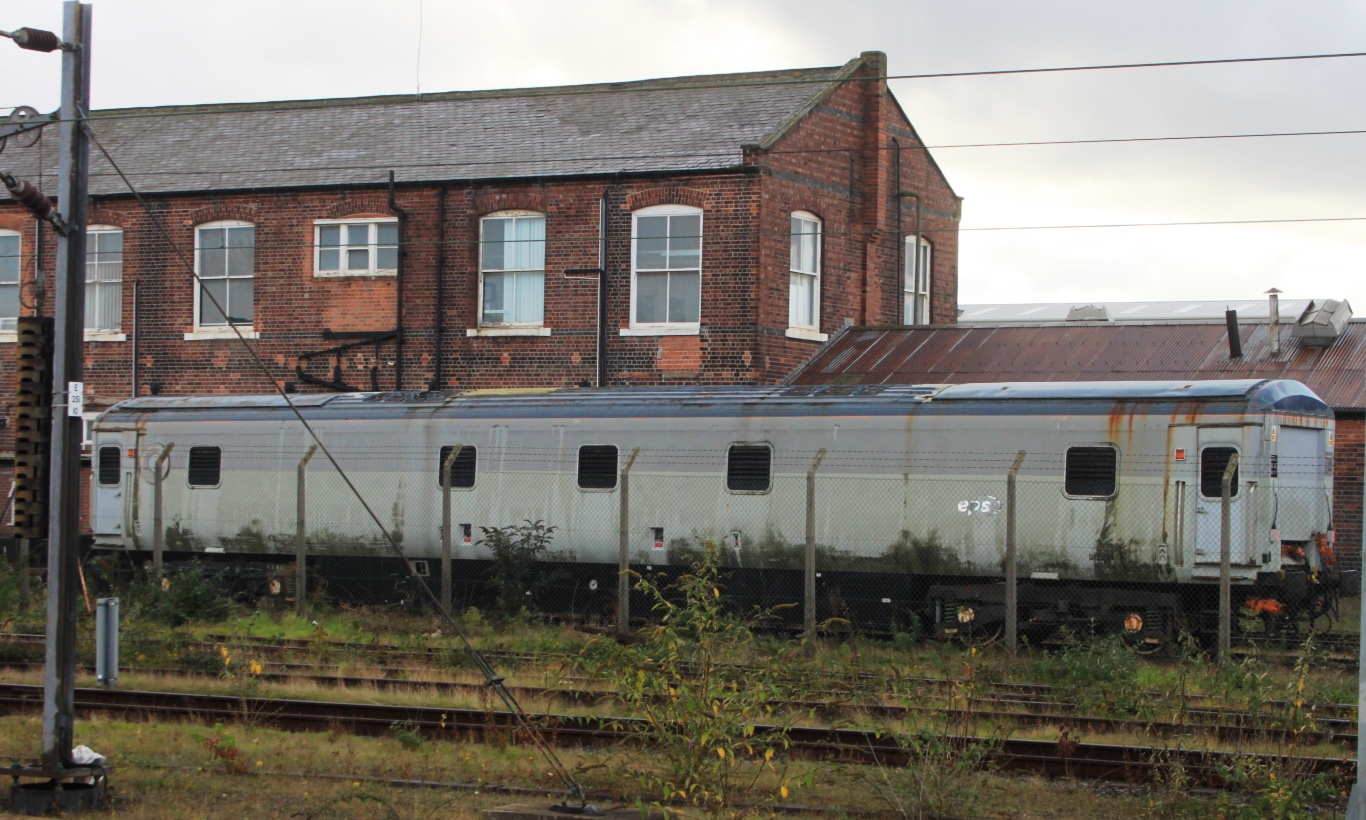
A generator van stored at Doncaster Works in 2016

The Class 37/6 locomotives do not have ETS generating capability so could not provide the power required by the on-board services of the Nightstar trains. To produce the ETS there would have been a generator van, containing two 350 kVA Cummins diesel engines, marshalled between the two Class 37/6 locomotives. Five were converted from redundant British Rail Mark 3 sleeper coaches. The conversion involved a full overhaul, the removal of the interior and the fitment of the generators in a fire-proof acoustic housing. Fuel tanks were also installed in place of the sleeper's water tanks, and through cabling and piping fitted for locomotive control. Whilst initially still classed as coaching stock after conversion, this was later changed and they were classed as Class 96/3 locomotives.

In July 2009, 96372/3/4/5 were moved to Wolverton Works where they donated their bogies for Direct Rail Services to use on its charter fleet. Subsequently, they all then moved to Long Marston for further secure storage. In January 2011 96374 was purchased by Wabtec and moved to Doncaster Works where modifications were made to allow it to provide ETS for the Mk4 refurbishment program.

In January 2016 96371 was sent to UK Rail Leasing, Leicester for trial conversion to a stock heating/testing van. It was sold to Eastern Rail Services in March 2019 and moved to Polmadie TRSMD in 2020 for use a carriage heater with the Caledonian Sleeper.

In August 2020, Eastern Rail Services purchased 96374 from Wabtec which had been stored at Doncaster Works. It has since been relocated to Great Yarmouth for use as a carriage heater for their Mk2 and Mk3 fleets and was repainted into Intercity livery.

In December 2021, Eastern Rail Services purchased the three remaining Generator Vans from Motorail, with 96372 moving to Great Yarmouth.

In November 2022, 96371 was transported to Inverness to be used as a carriage heater for Caledonian Sleeper.

In June 2025, 96371 was repainted into a Railway 200 livery to act as a generator for the exhibition train "Inspiration" since the class 66s that would haul it could not provide coach power.

Vehicle No	Former No	Current owner	Current location	Status
96371	10545	Eastern Rail Services	Based at Great Yarmouth, however not in storage	In use as a generator for the Railway 200 exhibition train "Inspiration"
96372	10562	Eastern Rail Services	Great Yarmouth	Stored
96373	10568	Eastern Rail Services	Long Marston	Stored
96374	10585	Eastern Rail Services	Great Yarmouth	Serviceable
96375	10587	Eastern Rail Services	Long Marston	Stored

== Routes ==
When originally proposed in 1992, the service pattern was to be as follows:

=== London services ===
- London to and from Amsterdam and Cologne via Brussels
- London to and from Dortmund and Frankfurt via Brussels

These trains would each have been formed of two eight-car sub-sets (one for each destination) that would be split into separate trains at Aachen, with the reverse happening for trains to London.

=== Beyond London services ===
- Plymouth to/from Brussels
- Swansea to/from Paris
- Glasgow Central to/from Paris and Brussels

The Plymouth and Swansea trains would each have been formed of a single seven-car sub-set, and the Glasgow train of two seven-car sub-sets. The Plymouth and Swansea trains would be diesel hauled beyond London by a class 37/6 and Generator set, with the Glasgow train electric hauled. At London Kensington Olympia, the Glasgow train would be split and the two sub-sets attached to the respective Swansea and Plymouth trains to form one train to Paris and one to Brussels. They would be electric hauled from London onwards.

The trains would all be electric hauled by a class 92 locomotive from London to Dollands Moor Freight Yard where a second class 92 would be attached to the rear of the train. This was to meet the Channel Tunnel safety requirements that, in case of emergency, the train could be split in half and each half driven out independently.

=== Revised routes ===
After the numerous delays, and due to changing passenger requirements, the final proposed routing called for trains on five routes to Glasgow, London, Manchester Piccadilly, Plymouth and Swansea in the UK to and from Amsterdam, Dortmund and Frankfurt.

== Delay ==
The 139 carriage stock order began construction in 1992 and continued slowly until the whole project was put on hold in 1997, then formally abandoned in 1999. The reasons for the delay in the start of operations and then the final cancelling of construction are similar to those given for the non-start of Regional Eurostar service: primarily due to rising costs and competition from low-cost airlines such as Ryanair and EasyJet.

Fragmentation and privatisation of Britain's rail network also left European Passenger Services (Eurostar) as a small operator lacking financial muscle and technical know-how, and incapable of operating such a service even had there been demand for it.

Just before the service was finally abandoned, it was estimated by one expert to The Sunday Times that only one European produced locomotive could have hauled and powered a fully laden Nightstar - and that the locomotive was not due into production for another two years, would not fit the British loading gauge, and would draw too much power from a single section, thus requiring it to have special clearance while operating. The article concluded that the only pair of locomotives available to power and move the complete train was the Eurostar modified TGV power car.

In retrospect, the service was ill-conceived. So many trains to various destinations would probably have been poorly used, and security at some stations would have been expensive, because security-cleared international travellers would have needed to be separated from local passengers. Eurostar also neglected the core routes from London to Paris and Brussels, claiming these were not needed because of the short journey time, but overlooking that morning meetings otherwise require an overnight stay or a very early start. A late night departure and early morning arrival on the London to Paris/Brussels/Amsterdam/Cologne axis, with internal connections elsewhere, would have had better potential. A similar service was proposed in 2009 using more conventional rolling stock, but did not gain sufficient support.

== Abandonment ==
Although only 45 cars (20 seated, 19 sleeper & 6 service vehicles) of the 139-car order were completed when the project was put on hold in 1997, at least 32 more were partially complete and all of the 139 bodyshells were complete. All the complete and partially complete cars were moved to secure storage, mainly at MoD Kineton which stored 38 numbered complete cars and 32 unnumbered incomplete cars in 2001.

After the Nightstar service, in June 1997, London and Continental Railways initially sold half of the fleet of twelve Class 37/6 locomotives to Direct Rail Services, followed by a further three in 2000 and the remaining three in 2007.

Discussions were held within Government during 1997-8 as to what to do with the redundant Nightstar fleet. One of the mooted ideas was to rebuild some of them as a replacement for the British Royal Train, but this idea was abandoned in favour of the cheaper option of reducing the existing Royal Train fleet and refurbishing the remaining carriages.

== Resale ==
After abandonment of the service, in 2002 London and Continental Railways were credited by the UK Government with the lease fees on the carriages. The UK Government reached an agreement with builders Alstom to sell the carriages back, subject to Alstom securing a new purchaser.

There was interest in the carriages but the weight, high electric train supply demand and the need to extensively modify them to suit the prospective operator's needs meant there were no takers, with Alstom accepting that if they could not sell them they would all eventually be scrapped. The heavy weight steel (by European standards) of the cars (seated cars: 50.2 tonnes, sleeper cars: 53.3 tonnes, service vehicles: 52.9 tonnes) came from all the safety systems required for the carriages to run through the Channel Tunnel, and the wiring for the over-specified hotel services. The same over-specified hotel services also account for the high ETS index.

== Via Rail Canada ==
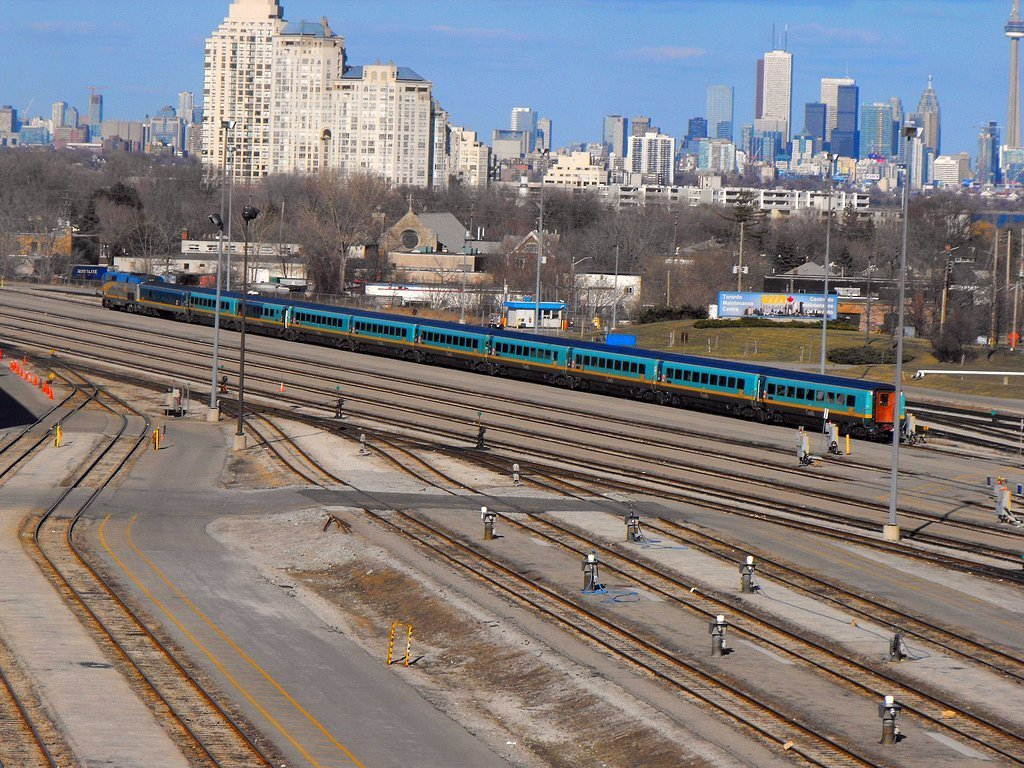
Via Rail Renaissance carriages in Toronto in April 2009

Alstom confirmed in early May 2000 that Canada's Via Rail was interested in purchasing some of the redundant Nightstar stock. Via Rail took delivery of three cars for evaluation in June 2000.

The carriages required several modifications for Canadian service:

- Fitting of knuckle couplers
- Doorways to suit Canadian low-level platforms
- Compatible with the 480 V HEP system
- Enhanced air-conditioning system

In December 2000 Via Rail purchased all 139 Nightstar carriages. Due to the lack of other interested purchasers, Via Rail acquired them for $130 million, a considerable discount from the fair market value of $400–500 million. Via Rail planned to use them to expand service in the Corridor routes (notably on services between Toronto, Montreal, Ottawa, and Quebec), on sleeper routes from Montreal to Halifax (Ocean) and Gaspé (Montreal – Gaspé train), and to free up existing stock for use on The Canadian (Toronto–Vancouver) transcontinental route.

The cars were shipped to Bombardier Transportation’s Thunder Bay facility, where the conversion work was carried out. The cars now comprise Via Rail's Renaissance fleet. The first entered service in June 2002 on The Enterprise. Thirty-three of the carriages were never used and the shells dumped in a field at Thunder Bay.
