= GUV =

GUV may refer to:

- General Utility Van, a British rail vehicle
- Governor
- Guruvayur railway station, in Kerala, India
