= Restaurant Standard Buffet =

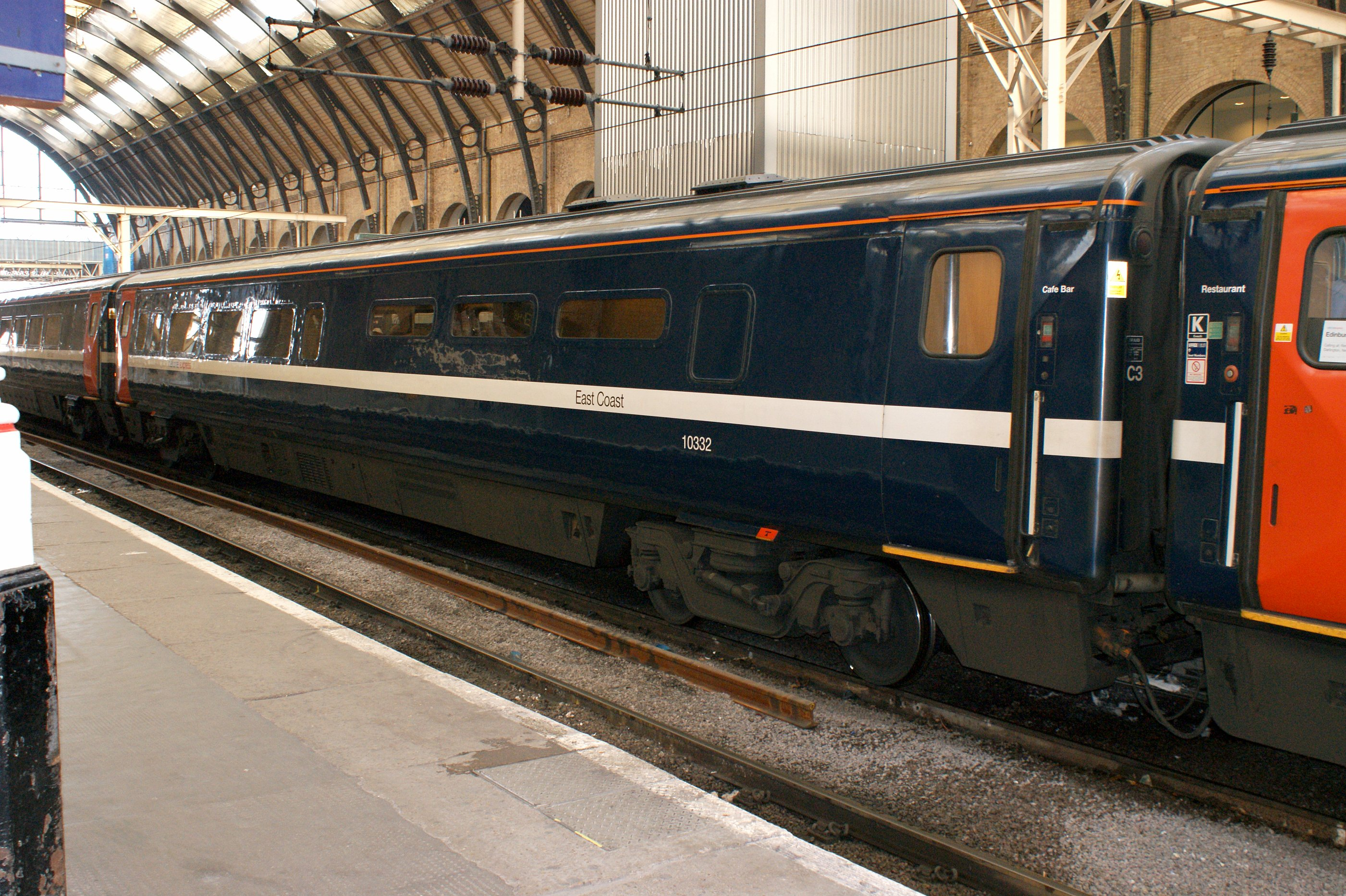
National Express East Coast Mark 4 RSB at London Kings Cross

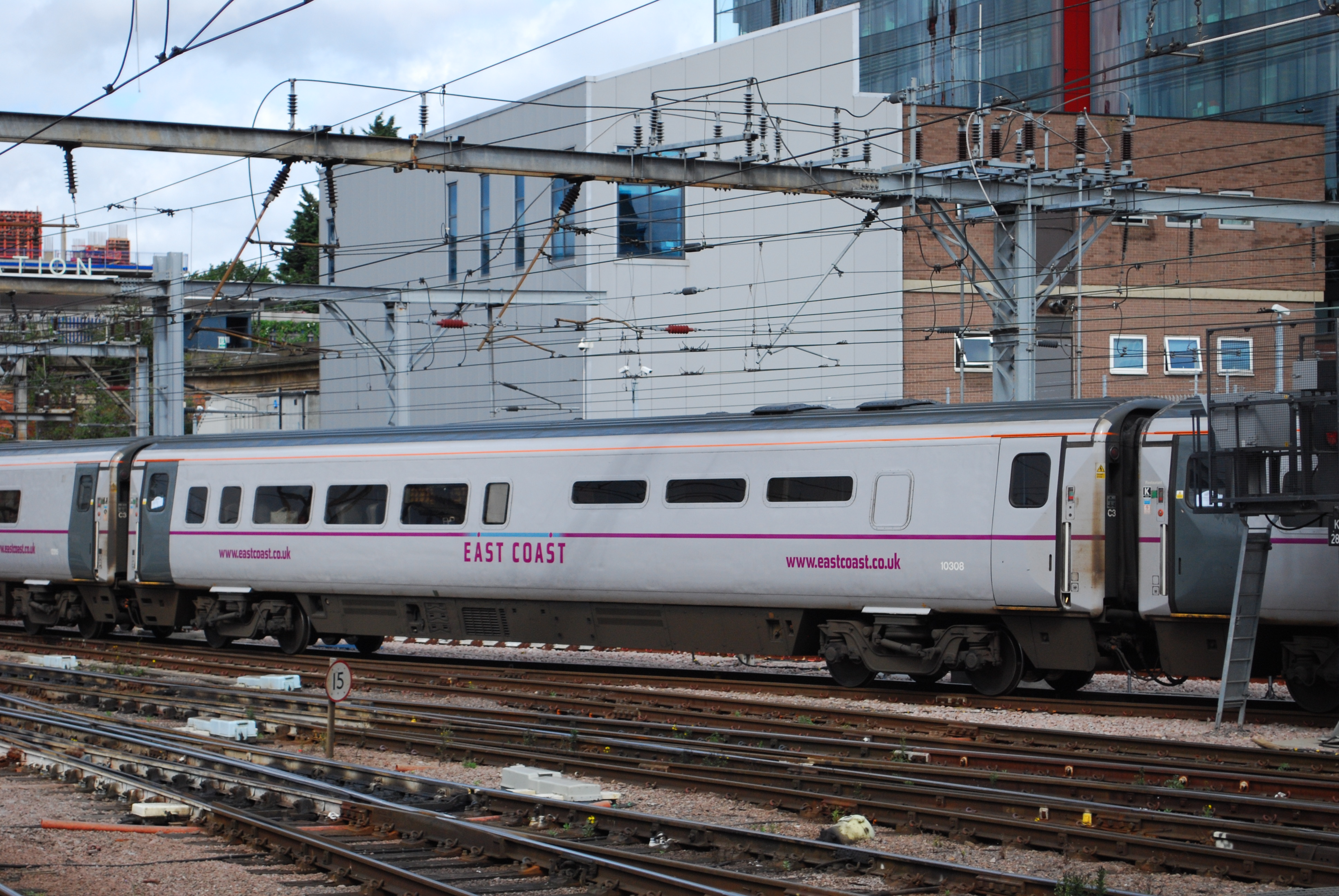
East Coast RSB at London Kings Cross

A Restaurant Standard Buffet (RSB) is a type of rail passenger car that operates on railway lines within the United Kingdom.

== Mark 4 RSB ==
The British Rail Mark 4 converted coaches comprise 30 standard class seats placed round tables in an airline style formation. They were manufactured as Restaurant First Buffets by Metro-Cammell, Washwood Heath as part of the InterCity 225 sets for use on the East Coast Main Line. When refurbished by GNER as part of its Project Mallard in the mid-2000s, the first class seating was replaced by standard class seating and they thus became Restaurant Standard Buffets.

There are no plug sockets at these seats due to the high power usage of the catering equipment in the coach. The buffet counter is equipped with a coffee machine, panini toaster, and a large fixed fridge.

The coaches were originally built to provide on board catering and crew accommodation. The kitchen was equipped with 2 fan ovens, 2 removable refrigerators, a 4 ring hob, extractor fan system, microwave, dishwasher, panini (sandwich) toaster, hot water still and water steriliser.

Originally operated by InterCity, all passed to successive InterCity East Coast franchisees GNER, National Express East Coast, East Coast, Virgin Trains East Coast and London North Eastern Railway. Withdrawals commenced in 2019 as the Class 801s entered service. Some are now operated Transport for Wales Rail.
