= R (Save Our Railways) v Director of Passenger Rail Franchising =

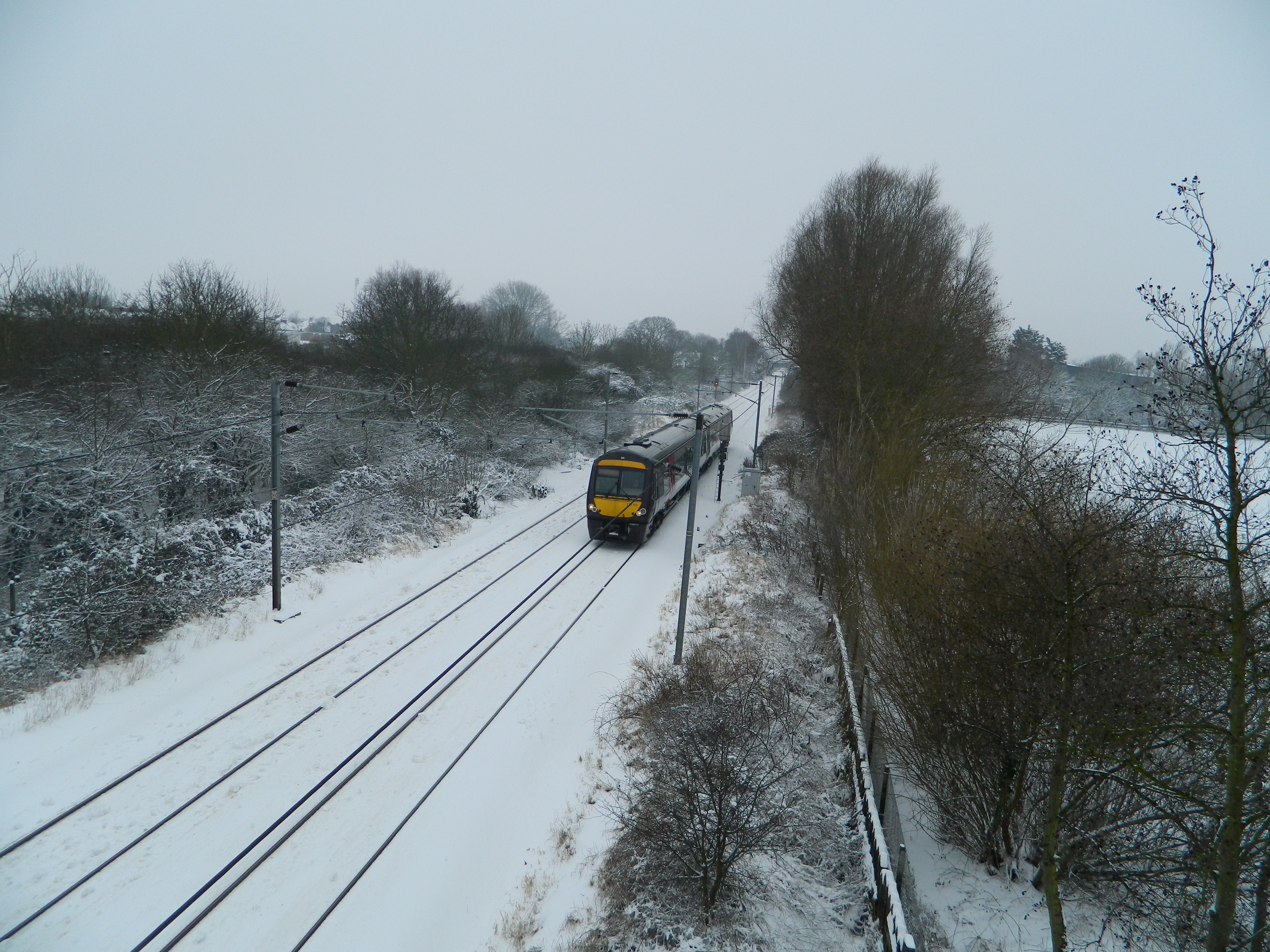
- Court: Court of Appeal
- Citation: [1996] CLC 596, (18 Dec 1995) The Times

Keywords
- Rail

R (Save Our Railways) v Director of Passenger Rail Franchising [1996] CLC 596 is a UK enterprise law case, concerning rail transport in Great Britain.

== Facts ==
The claimant, Save Our Railways, sought judicial review for the Director of Passenger Rail Franchising failing to take account of Minister guidance under the Railways Act 1993. Save Our Railways was an organisation sponsored by trade unions that opposed privatisation. The Minister’s instruction, laid before Parliament said ‘for the initial letting of franchises, your specification of minimum service levels... is to be based on that being provided by British Rail immediately before franchising.’ However, with the Minister’s approval, in the first 7 franchises, offered by the Rail Franchising Director service levels were set below existing services. It reasoned that services would either be sustained by demand or unwarranted subsidies for loss-making services would be avoided.

== Judgment ==
The High Court dismissed the application for judicial review.

=== Court of Appeal ===
The Court of Appeal, Tom Bingham (giving judgment with Waite LJ and Otton LJ) held that Save Our Railways had standing for judicial review on behalf of rail users. The Franchise Director had not properly understood Ministerial instructions. But no mandatory remedy was granted, referring the question back to the Franchise Director for further consideration. The Court said the DPRF complied with instructions that Passenger Service Requirements be based on that provided by British Rail. This justified quashing the PSR which fell below the standard.

Sir Thomas Bingham MR said the following:

‘Based on’ is not a term of art, and it is not an exact term. It permits some latitude. Every train timetabled by BR need not continue to run. There may be changes, and within limits it is for the Franchising Director to rule on the extent of the changes. His is the primary judgment. But there is a limit to the changes which may be made without ceasing to comply with the instruction.... The changes must in our view be marginal, not significant... The Franchising Director’s approach... is an intelligible and no way irrational approach. But it is not in our view an approach that gives effect to the instruction.

== Significance ==
Afterward, the Minister simply decided ‘to clarify’ that the rules were ‘to ensure that they reflect beyond doubt the policy that we have always followed’. So in effect Save Our Railways won the case, but lost the campaign.

== See also ==
- United Kingdom enterprise law
