= Motorail (British Rail) =

Brand of long-distance rail services

- Logo from 1966 to 1995.

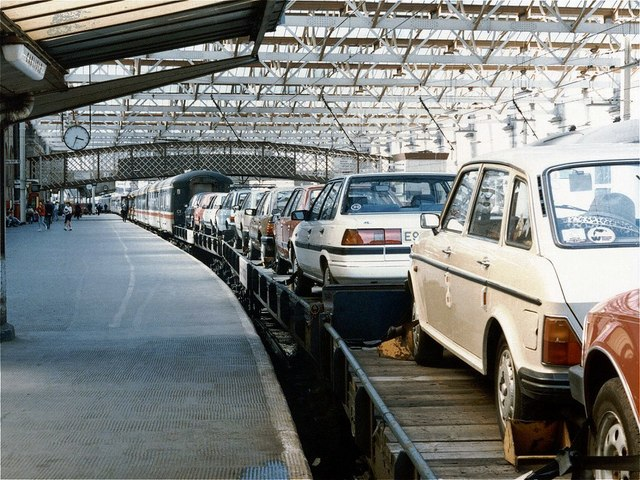
- A Motorail service to Scotland at Carlisle in 1988

Overview
- Stations called at: 28 (Not all were served in all years of operation.)
- Parent company: British Rail
- Dates of operation: 1955–1995
- Successor: 1999–2005 First Great Western Night Riviera Motorail

Motorail was the brand name for British Rail's long-distance services that carried passengers and their cars. During its latter years of operation, it was grouped under the wider InterCity sector.

During June 1955, the Car-Sleeper Limited service was introduced, Britain's first scheduled long distances car-carrying service, between London and Perth. This, and other early services such as the Continental Car Sleeper, proved there was demand for such a facility between many of Britain's major cities. Accordingly, British Rail opted to invest in the expansion of its offerings in this area, launching the Motorail brand in 1966 along with the opening of a dedicated terminal at Kensington Olympia. The service continued to be expanded into the 1970s; at the peak of its operations, 100,000 passengers used Motorail annually.

Passenger numbers noticeably dropped during the 1980s; this was attributed to a myriad of factors including the expansion of Britain's motorway network, the availability of better cars, and even the provision of faster conventional passenger rail services under the Intercity brand. The wider privatisation of British Rail proved to be a fatal development for Motorail; its nature made it difficult to effectively franchise, and the downturn in passenger numbers to as low as 20,000 made it a vulnerable target to withdrawal. Despite efforts towards retention, the alleged hostility of the Director of Passenger Rail Franchising Roger Salmon to Motorail proved decisive. During May 1995, the final Motorail services were run.

During September 1999, the franchised train operator First Great Western relaunched a service from London Paddington to Penzance; however, this was withdrawn six years later.

== History ==
The origins of road vehicle-carrying trains can be traced back to the earliest days of the railway, being a recorded practice on the Liverpool and Manchester Railway, the first inter-city railway in the world. Throughout the nineteenth century, various British railway companies would undertake such haulage, but in an ad-hoc fashion. On 7 April 1909 the Great Western Railway started a formal service for the conveyance of motor cars through the Severn Tunnel. Also in 1909 a train service started running over Connel Bridge between Connel Ferry station and Benderloch on which road vehicles could be transported. A single car was carried on a wagon hauled by a charabanc. By the 1930s, there were regular services between London and various destinations in Scotland, typically sleeper trains, that carried cars on flatbed wagons.

The first scheduled long distances services akin to Motorail came during the British Rail era, being launched in June 1955 via the introduction of the Car-Sleeper Limited service between London and Perth. This service, which was operated between June and September, conveying both car and driver for £15 return (equivalent to £341 in 2025) inclusive of sleeping berth.

In the summer of 1956, British Railways introduced the Continental Car Sleeper overnight from Newcastle and Stockton to Dover connecting with a ferry to Boulogne, and also the West Country Car Sleeper from Newcastle and Stockton to Exeter. The Highlands Car Special was launched at the same time offering a service from York to Inverness and another Continental Car Sleeper service from Manchester to Dover was launched in June 1956 using a ferry to cross the English Channel, for £24 return. The popularity of these car-sleeper trains was such that further investments would be made in the sector. During June 1961, it was reported that over 50,000 cars had been transported by Car-Sleeper Limited; to accommodate growing demand, a new two-tier transporter was introduced to the service.

During 1966, the Motorail brand was introduced in conjunction with the opening of a dedicated terminal for the service at Kensington Olympia, selected for its abundant existing rail connections to various other parts of Britain, which made it a natural hub.

== Routes ==
Motorail operated from London to many places including Penzance, Plymouth, Fishguard Harbour, Brockenhurst, Carlisle, Edinburgh, Perth, Inverness and Fort William. A short-lived service from London to Glasgow was introduced in the early 1990s.

Various fare schemes and accommodation levels were available on Motorail; both first class and second class seats were available on the Car-Tourist Service between London Paddington and St Austell. Cheaper fares would be offered on mid-week services, although only for second class accommodation. Meals were available for purchase, while overnight accommodation deals with British Transport Hotels were also promoted.

The service was popular at a time when long-distance travel by car involved long journey times; by 1972, British Rail was promoting the Motorail service as carrying 70,000 cars per year. Additional services were introduced in 1972 between Stirling and Dover, London Kensington Olympia and Carmarthen, and Birmingham and Inverness. An overnight service was also introduced between London Kensington and Carlisle to supplement the daytime service. At the peak of its use, 100,000 passengers were travelling via Motorail each year.

A variety of rolling stock, both open and enclosed, was used. Many routes were operated with overnight sleeper services. The open double deck Cartic 4 was first used on a Kensington Olympia to Perth Motorail on 22 June 1966. Cartic 4s were last used on Motorail service during 1978, but continued to be actively operated for delivering new vehicles to dealerships into the twenty-first century.

== Withdrawal ==
Over the decades, usage on many of Motorail's services declined considerably. The expansion of Britain's motorway network, along with increasingly capable cars, incorporating innovations such as synchronised gears, front-wheel drive, radial tyres and air conditioning, had improved comfort levels for long-distance driving, and thus fewer travellers were inclined to head towards Motorail's offerings. Another area of competition was British Rail's own Intercity services which, as they increased in speed over time, led to some travellers favouring them instead.

Some elements of the service were withdrawn fairly early, such as the decision to close Sutton Coldfield's Motorail terminal in 1972; even at this point, the rising popularity of road transport was being attributed for the decision. During February 1989, British Rail announced that it was permanently discontinuing the London to Stirling service.

The death knell of Motorail would be sounded by wider political ambitions to reform Britain's railways in the 1990s. Amid the preparations for the privatisation of British Rail, there was a determined effort to curtail or entirely end unprofitable non-essential activities; the Motorail services, which reportedly carried roughly 20,000 cars per year by this point, had been operated at a significant loss for some time already. Furthermore, Motorail's services were difficult to incorporate into any of the franchises being created and thus posed an organisational challenge if they were to be continued. North-East Fife MP Menzies Campbell has alleged that Motorail's continued existence had been stymied by the Director of Passenger Rail Franchising Roger Salmon, and criticised the lack of public consultancies on the issue.

One late effort made to navigate these difficulties was undertaken by Scotrail and the Royal Mail to integrate Motorail services onto existing overnight mail trains; despite the backing of various Scottish politicians, talks towards this end did not amount to much substance. Accordingly, during late May 1995, the remaining seven Motorail services, which ran between London, Bristol, Edinburgh, Glasgow, Aberdeen, Inverness and Fort William, ceased entirely.

During September 1999, the franchised train operator First Great Western relaunched a service from London Paddington to Penzance as part of its Night Riviera overnight sleeper service using eight converted general utility vans. First Great Western opted to permanently withdraw this service at the end of summer 2005.

== Gallery ==
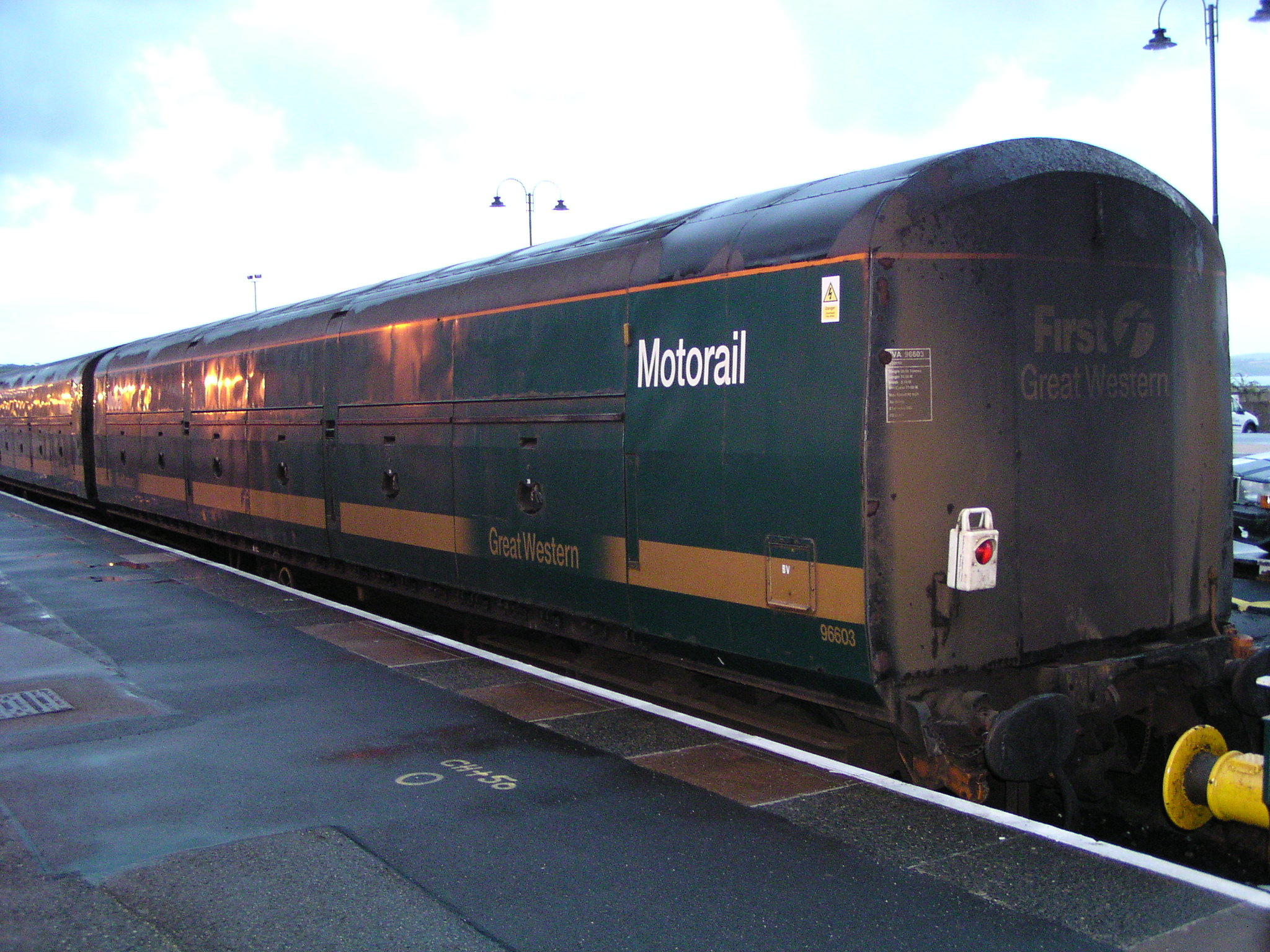
Night Riviera Motorail van NVA at Penzance in August 2003

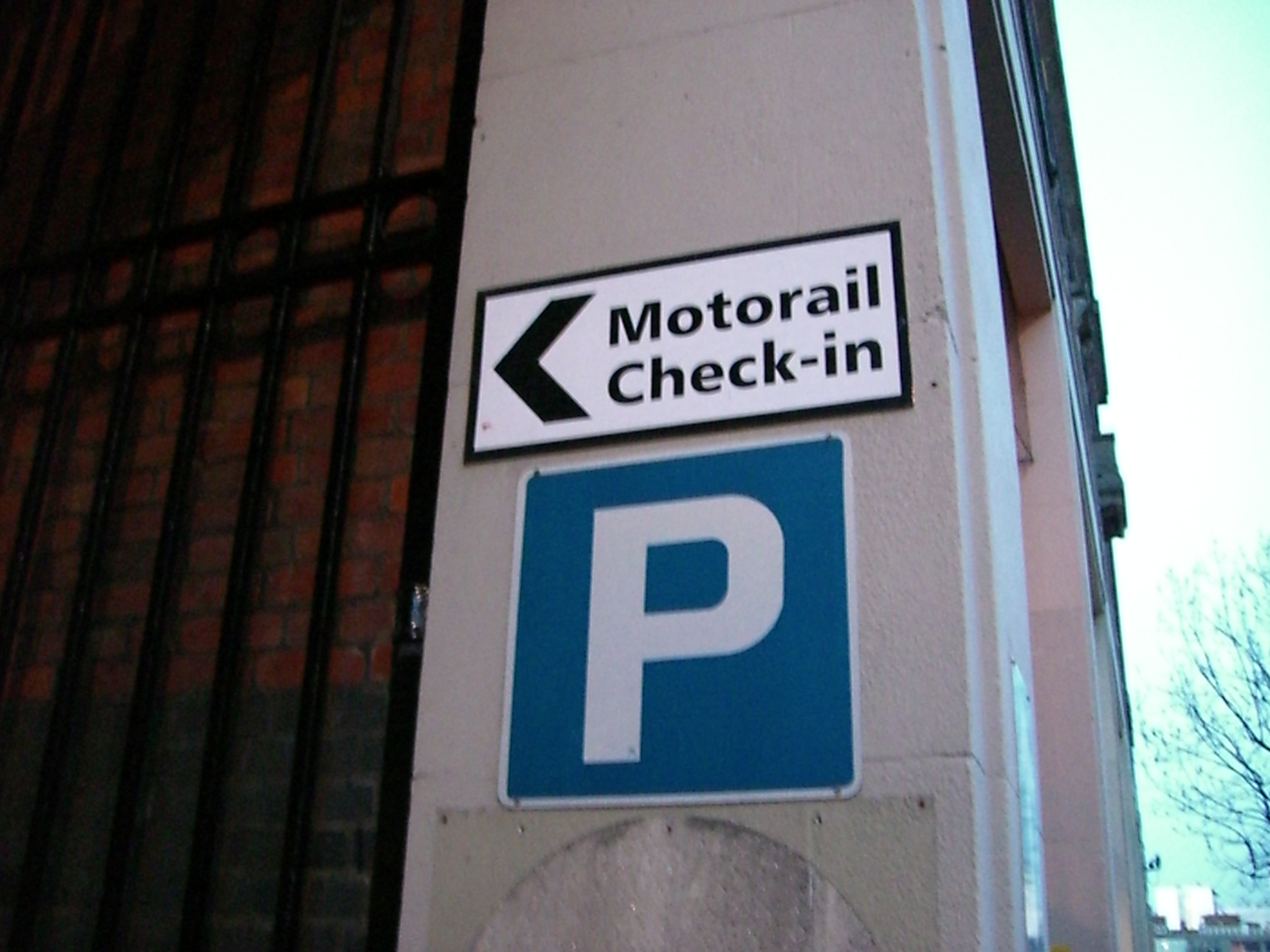
Motorail ended in summer 2005; there were still signs for it at Paddington in April 2006.

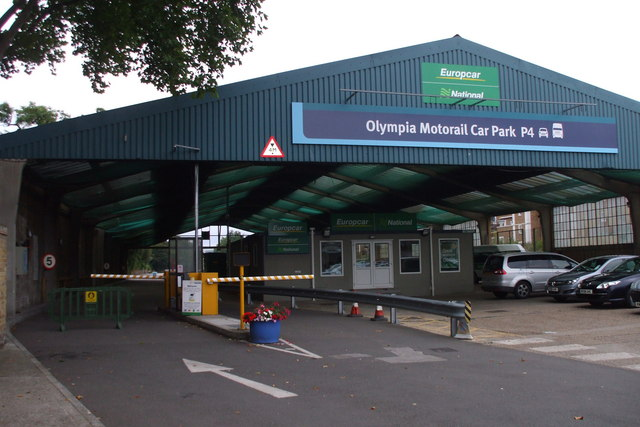
The former Motorail terminal at Kensington Olympia, in 2009. Since Motorail services here ceased, the building has been designated "Olympia Motorail Car Park P4".

== See also ==
- Accompanied car train
- Auto-Train, a similar service in the United States
