= Enterprise (Via Rail train) =

Overview
- Service type: Intercity rail
- Status: Discontinued
- Locale: Canada
- First service: January 16, 2000
- Last service: October 29, 2005
- Former operator(s): Via Rail

Route
- Termini: Toronto, Ontario; Montreal, Quebec
- Average journey time: 8.5 hours
- Service frequency: Daily
- Train number(s): 50, 51

Technical
- Track gauge: 1,435 mm (4 ft 8 1/2 in)

The Enterprise was a Via Rail train which operated overnight between Montreal and Toronto in Canada. Since the trip took only five hours, the train would stop en route, allowing the train's departure to be in the evening and its arrival in the morning. In 2002, the Enterprise was the first Via train to use the new Renaissance cars. The Enterprise was discontinued in October 2005 and replaced by an early morning trip on the truncated Kingston–Toronto segment.
