= Regional Eurostar =

Never-implemented Eurostar services from north of London

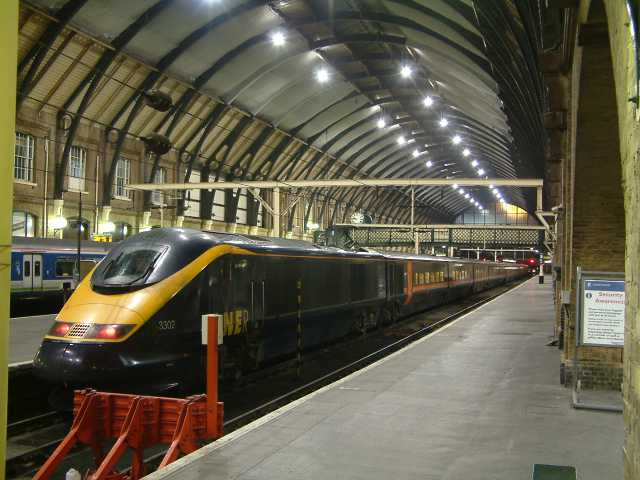
One of the North of London Class 373/3 or TGV tmst train in GNER livery at London King's Cross

Regional Eurostar was a planned Eurostar train service from Paris and Brussels to locations in the United Kingdom to the north and west of London.

While the Channel Tunnel was being planned and constructed in the 1980s, the operation of Eurostar services across Britain was included in the plans. To this end, roughly £320 million was invested into railway infrastructure, including new railway interconnections, depots, and other facilities, as well as the procurement of a dedicated fleet of seven North of London, 14-coach British Rail Class 373/3 trainsets. Regional daytime services to Glasgow Central via the East Coast Main Line and Manchester Piccadilly via the West Coast Main Line, and Nightstar sleeper services to the same cities as well as Plymouth and Cardiff via the Great Western Main Line. Trial runs were undertaken using Class 373/2 sets on both the East and West Coast Main Lines in preparation for full-scale services being launched during the late 1990s.

However, various factors dampened the prospects for running such services. During the mid 1990s, British Rail was undergoing the complicated process of privatisation; the British Rail subsidiary European Passenger Services (EPS) was originally intended to operate the regional Eurostar. Responsibility was transferred to the private entity London and Continental Railways (LCR) yet the operator soon found that the inter-capital Eurostar services had achieved lower than forecast passenger numbers and promptly needed financial support. Whilst officially regional Eurostar services have not been cancelled but are on hold or under review, this status has been maintained for several decades. Both LCR and Virgin Rail Group had their proposals for regional Eurostar services reviewed by the Department for Transport and independent organisations. Ministers have objected to the failure to run such services.

LCR has posited that further development of the British high speed rail network improves the economics of prospective regional Eurostar services; thus, the completion of schemes such as High Speed 2 may bring about such services finally.

== Beginnings ==
While the Channel Tunnel was being proposed and authorised during the 1980s, it was often promoted as being a key element to wider proposals for the operation of numerous high-speed rail services through it on both sides of the English Channel, forming a substantial network. The provision of these envisaged regional services to the wider population of Britain has been alleged to have been a crucial factor in the passing of the Channel Tunnel Act 1987 by Parliament and, thereby, the construction of the Channel Tunnel to begin with.

Over time, the scope for the regional Eurostar services was gradually reduced in scale to a core service that was envisaged to run along dedicated TGV-style high-speed lines between the three capital cities of Great Britain; these included regional daytime services to Glasgow Central via the East Coast Main Line and Manchester Piccadilly via the West Coast Main Line, and Nightstar sleeper services to the same cities as well as Plymouth and Cardiff via the Great Western Main Line.

In preparation for the running of these regional services, roughly £140 million was invested into railway infrastructure, such as new connections between existing lines so that the trains could be routed through effectively. As the high-speed rail line between London and the Channel Tunnel, High Speed 1, was not under construction Eurostar services within the UK were forced to use existing rail lines and connecting junctions were built to allow Regional Eurostars access via the congested West and North London Lines. Perhaps the most prominent single asset built was Manchester International Depot, which was intended to service the regional Eurostar fleet, based at Longsight in Manchester by London and Continental Railways. A large Eurostar-branded sign was attached to the outside of the depot with the slogan "le Eurostar habite ici" (French for "the Eurostar lives here"), although the depot was empty and unused for many years; the sign remained in place despite the regional Eurostar service never actually launching.

Further investment was made in the Class 373/3 North of London sets, essentially a shortened variant of the typical Eurostar sets; the combined rolling stock and infrastructure investment into the regional Eurostar service reportedly cost £320 million. Trial runs were undertaken using Class 373/2 sets on both the East and West Coast Main Lines and passenger information signs and Eurostar lounges were installed at stations along the route.

== Privatisation ==
At the same time as the Channel Tunnel was nearing completion, British Rail was undergoing the long process of privatisation and regional Eurostar can be seen as a victim of it. Many had seen regional services as more a political than economic cause, a means of gaining support for the Channel Tunnel from areas of the UK outside the South-East. A parliamentary select committee in 1999 said "The regions have been cheated". The economic case for merely the inter-capital services had been questioned from the outset but by the time the Channel Tunnel was opened in 1994, backing for regional services had already started to dry up. The British Rail subsidiary European Passenger Services (EPS), which was to undertake Eurostar operations jointly with SNCF of France and NMBS/SNCB of Belgium, took ownership of the 373/2s in 1996 at the same time as it was under the process of being privatised and transferred to London and Continental Railways (LCR) who won the contract to build the CTRL and run Eurostar services.

Due to lower than forecast passenger numbers on the inter-capital services, by 1998, LCR was in financial trouble. As part of a new deal with the UK government, in 1998 LCR subcontracted its share of Eurostar operations, via Eurostar (UK), to InterCapital and Regional Rail (ICRR). As part of its bid, ICRR stated that regional Eurostar services could not run without government subsidy, which the Department for Transport was unwilling to provide. The only other bidder to operate the UK share of the Eurostar operation for LCR, Richard Branson's Virgin Rail Group, claimed it was willing to run regional Eurostar services at its own risk, however the company subsequently informed the UK government that it too saw them as economically unviable. As part of its contract LCR was not legally required to start regional Eurostar services and, by 1999, it was clear that they would not operate.

British Rail, via EPS, ran a token domestic service from certain locations around the UK into Waterloo station using HSTs allowing connection with onward Eurostar service between May 1995 and January 1997 but these were ended at the time of privatisation.

== Reasons given and criticism ==
Whilst officially regional Eurostar services have not been cancelled but are on hold or under review, there are no longer many people who expect them to operate on current lines, although this may be reconsidered if the proposed High Speed 2 line comes to fruition. The most often cited reason given why they have not run is that they are economically unviable in the current climate. The 1990s saw a huge expansion in air travel across Europe with low-cost airlines – a business that had not existed in Europe when the Channel Tunnel was planned – flying from most major cities in the UK to locations on the continent, against which regional Eurostar services, with predicted journey times of almost nine hours for Glasgow to Paris, could not compete.

Unlike other international train services within the European Union where border controls have either had a long history of operation or are no longer enforced, the UK maintains concerns about customs and immigration. The inter-capital services still operate separately from the rest of the British railway network with passport checks carried out at St Pancras. (Note: Facilities at Ebbsfleet International and Ashford International stations have not been used since the COVID-19 pandemic.). There was concern that similar tight control would not be possible upon regional Eurostar services where separate check-in facilities at stations did not exist. Nevertheless, the Commons Transport Committee reported that they had determined that to be no meaningful technical obstacles to running such services.

To stop regional Eurostar services competing with domestic services in the envisioned competitive market that it was hoped the privatisation of British Rail would create, they were not to stop in London and only allowed to pick up at regional stations whilst going south and set down passengers going north. This was cited as another negative reason for their economic non-viability. Political factors related to the prospective regional Eurostar service, along with many other Channel Tunnel-related projects, have proved to be both complicated and protracted. During 1999, the Department of the Environment, Transport and the Regions commissioned Arthur D. Little Ltd to write an independent report into regional Eurostar service; this report, which was published in February 2000, examined various options, including the proposed operations by both Virgin Group and ICRR.

== Future ==
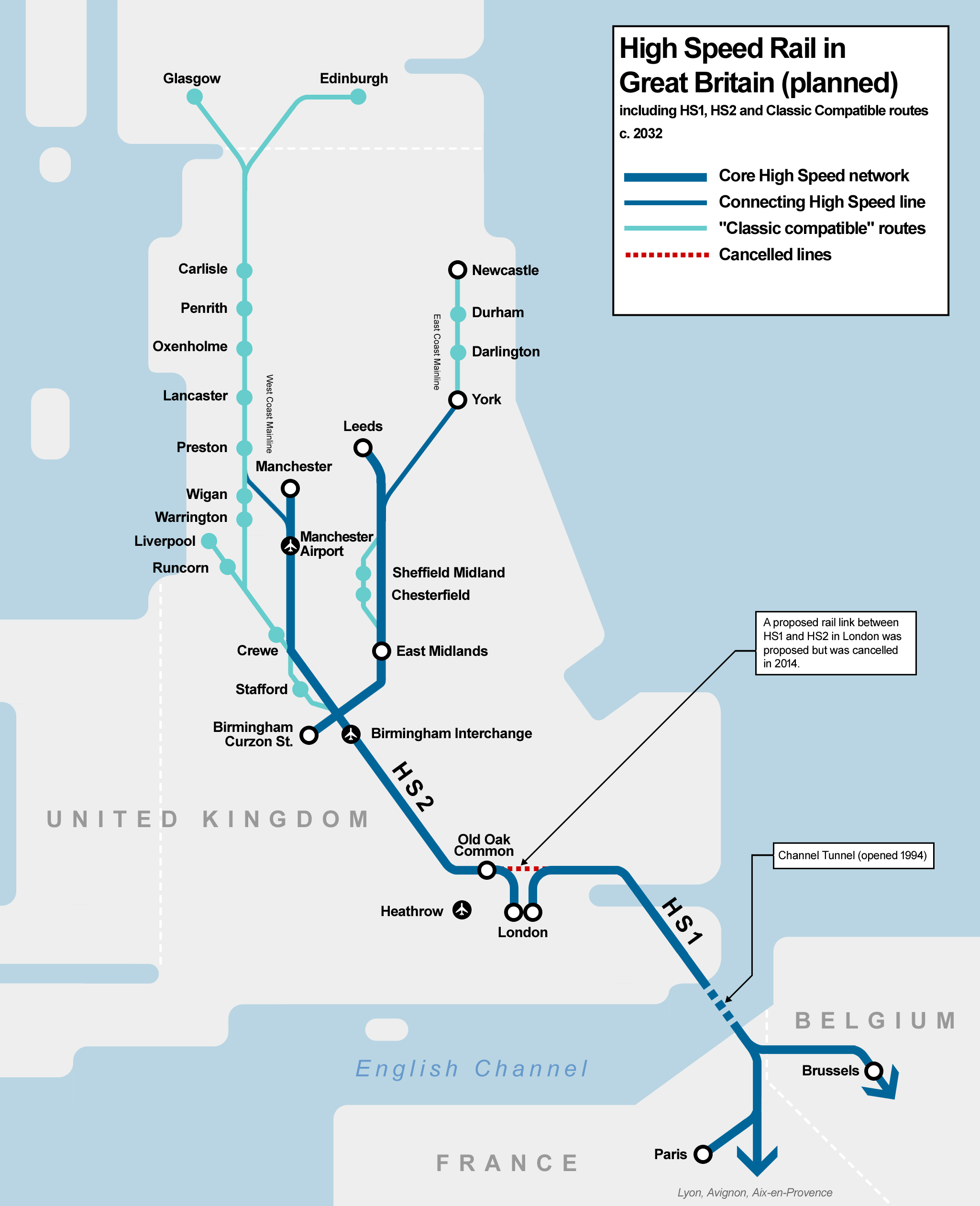
Diagrammatic map showing the planned High Speed rail network in Great Britain with proposed "Classic Compatible" rail routes extending to other parts of Britain

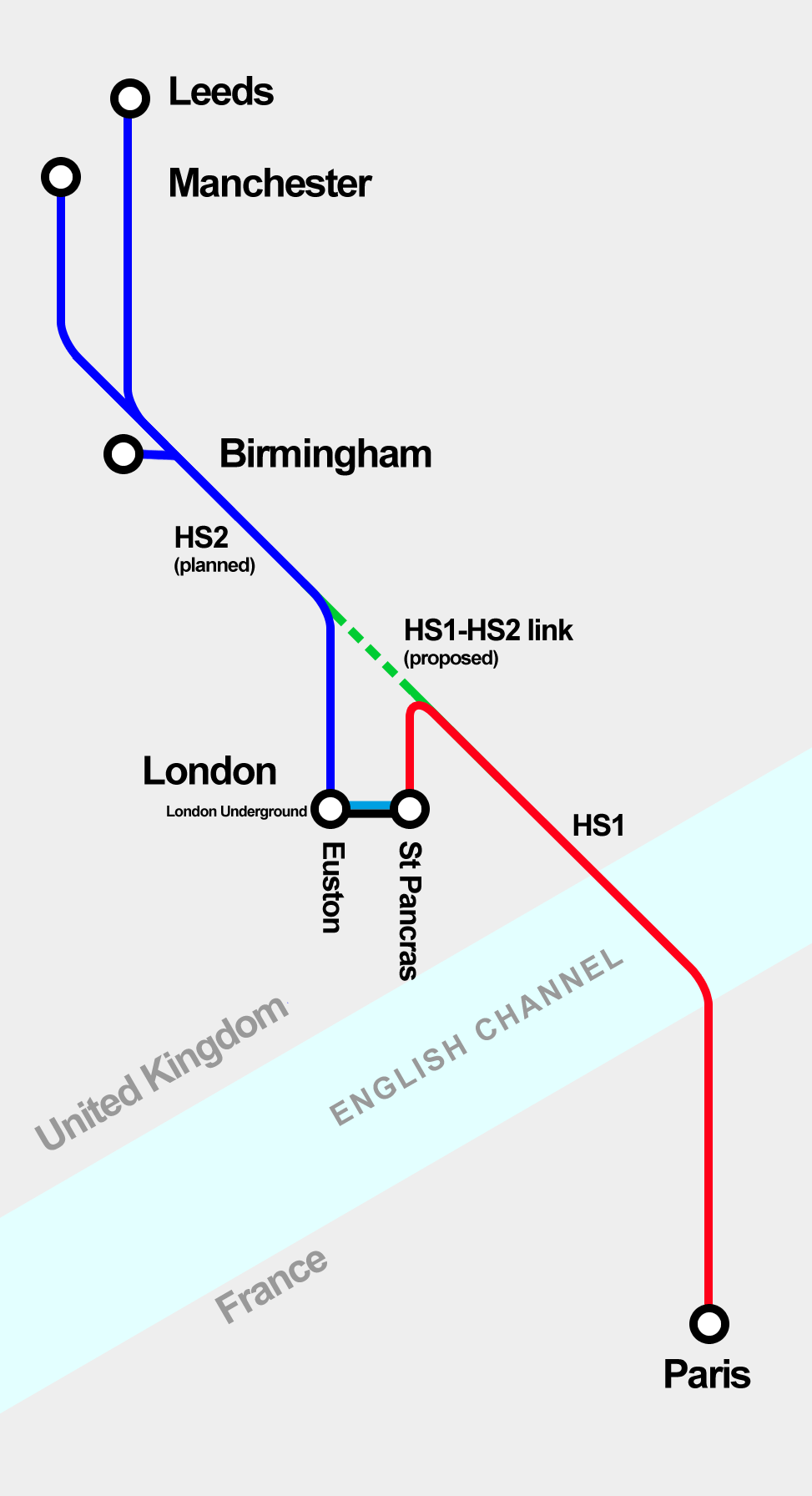
Diagram showing the destinations of HS1 & HS2 in the UK and France with the proposed link (not to scale)

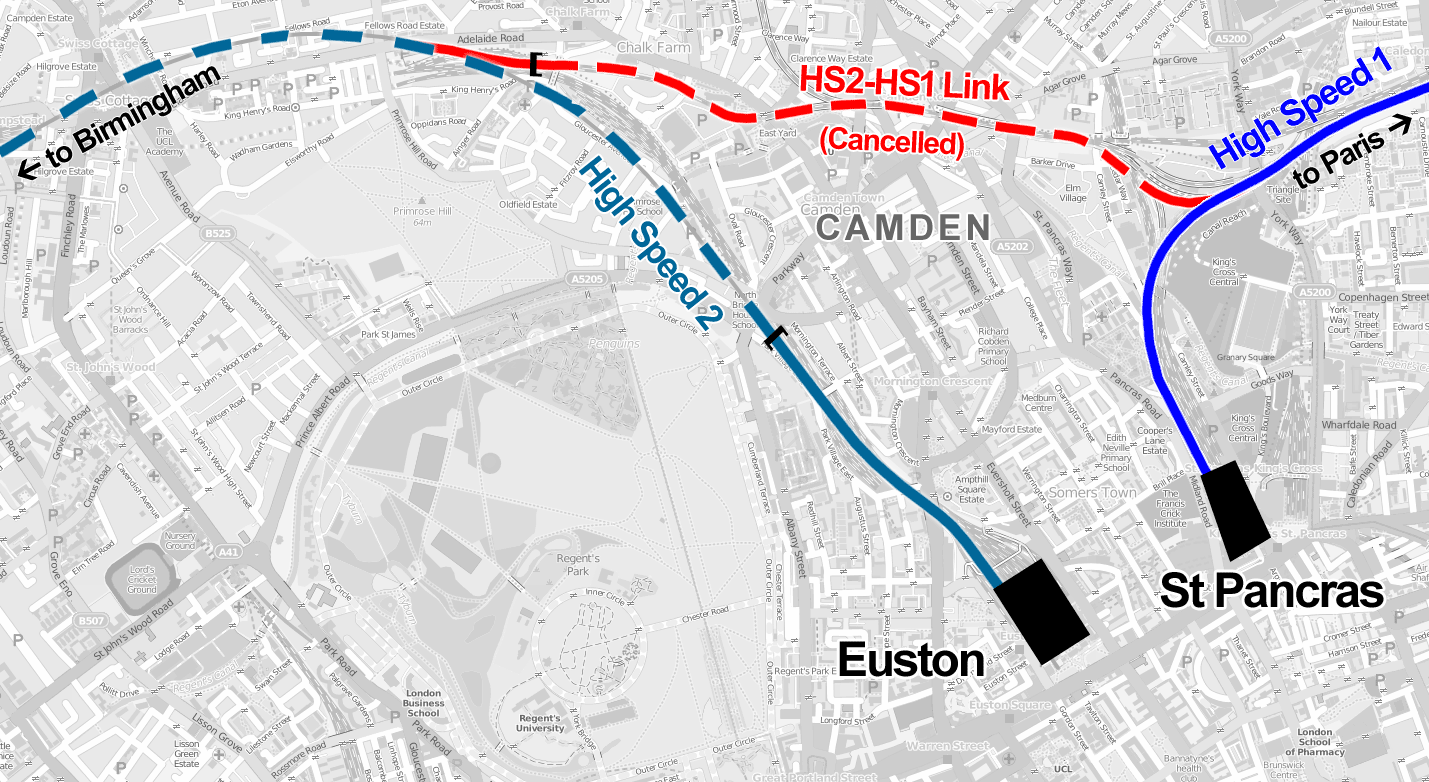
Map showing the proposed HS1–HS2 link across Camden, as proposed in 2010

The opening of High Speed 1 (HS1) in November 2007 brought connections to both the East Coast Main Line and North London Line (for the West Coast Main Line) at St Pancras. In the late 1990s, LCRR had publicly stated that the opening of HS1 would be a necessary prerequisite for the economic operation of regional Eurostar services. Furthermore, the maximum speed on the West Coast Main Line was increased from 110 to 125 mph in the mid-2000s (though Class 373s were limited by kinematic gauging constraints to 110 mph).

Eurostar (UK) still owns several track access rights and the rights to paths on both the East Coast and West Coast Main Lines, which allowed for the possibility of such services.

The proposed route of HS2 into London will bring the line very close to the existing HS1 line which terminates at St Pancras station; at their closest points, the two high-speed lines will be only 0.4 miles (0.64 km) apart, and the Department for Transport (DfT) examined various proposals for connecting HS1 and HS2. A governmental "command paper" published in March 2010 proposed either a rapid transit link between HS1 and HS2 terminals, or a direct railway connection. Later announcements on 10 January 2012 suggested that the first phase of the HS2 project was to include the construction of a single track link across North London between HS2 and HS1, partially in tunnels and partially over the existing North London Line, allowing for three trains per hour in both directions. DfT proposals in 2013 stated that this link would allow HS2 trains from the North of England to bypass London Euston and connect straight to HS1, enabling direct rail services to be run from Manchester, Leeds and Birmingham to Paris, Brussels and other continental European destinations.

The proposed HS1–HS2 link was subject to some criticism and concerns were raised by Camden London Borough Council about the impact on housing, Camden Market and other local businesses from construction work of the link. Sir David Higgins, chairman of HS2 Ltd, recommended that the Camden railway link should be omitted from the parliamentary bill, stating that HS2 passengers from the North of England would easily be able to transfer from the HS2 terminal at Euston to St Pancras by London Underground, to continue their journey on HS1 to continental Europe. He also recommended that alternative plans should be drawn up to link the high-speed lines. At the second reading of the High Speed Rail Bill in April 2014, the link was omitted from the final proposals. Following this decision, London mayor Boris Johnson expressed the opinion that an HS1–HS2 link should instead be provided by boring a tunnel under Camden.

Since 2014 there have been no confirmed plans to connect HS2 to HS1, meaning that Regional Eurostar services are no longer being considered. The prospect of an HS1–HS2 link was revived in 2018 when a proposal was put forward by engineering consultancy Expedition Engineering for HS4Air, a 140-kilometre (87 mi) high-speed railway line that would create a link between the two lines across southern England; by running south of Greater London, it would also connect Heathrow and Gatwick Airports. However, this scheme was rejected by the government in the same year.

== Routes ==
Due to track arrangements, customs and competition concerns and that the Eurostar terminal was located at Waterloo station on the south side of London regional Eurostar services were not to call at London. The Summer 1999 National Rail Timetable indicates the trains would have called at the following stations, with one train per day on the ECML Glasgow route, and two running to Manchester, one via the Trent Valley line and one via the Birmingham line. The faster train would not have called at stations between Stafford and Milton Keynes.

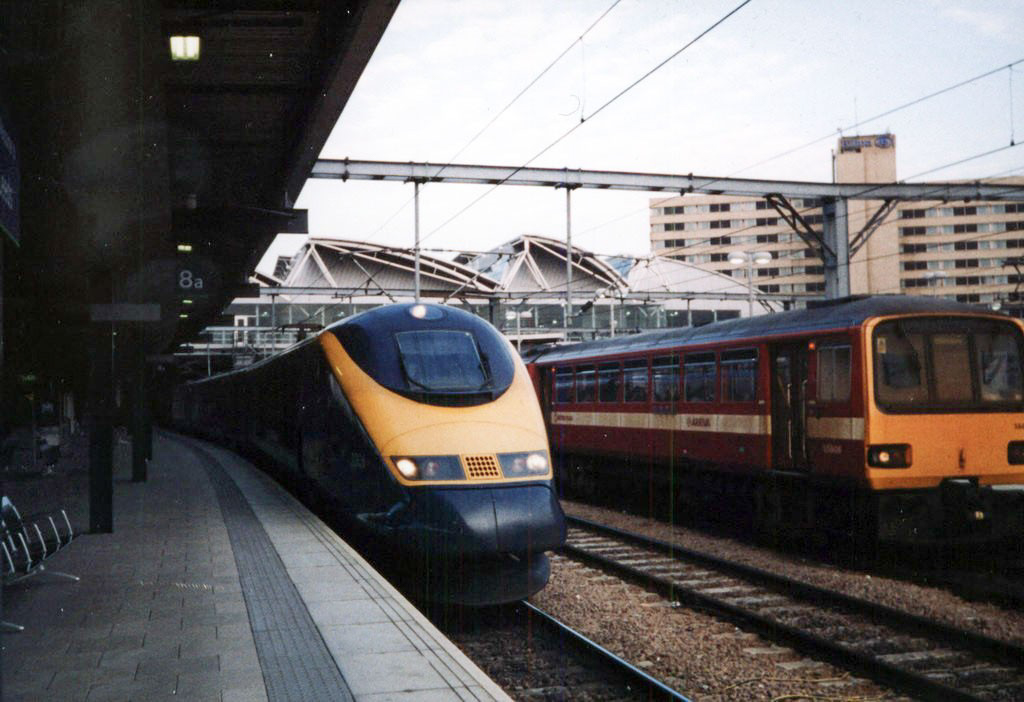
GNER regional Eurostar at Leeds alongside a class 144. on the East Coast Main Line

=== East Coast Main Line ===
- Glasgow Central railway station
- Edinburgh Waverley railway station
- Newcastle railway station
- Darlington
- York
- Leeds
- Doncaster
- Newark North Gate
- Peterborough

=== West Coast Main Line ===
- Manchester Piccadilly
- Stockport
- Crewe
- Stafford
- Wolverhampton
- Birmingham New Street
- Birmingham International
- Coventry
- Rugby
- Milton Keynes Central

Slots in British Rail/Railtrack's timetables for regional Eurostar services were included for many years even though the services did not run. This factor was objected to by some train operating companies who were informed they could not run additional domestic services along the congested mainlines. The dropping of these slots around 1999/2000 was seen by many as the final admission that regional Eurostar services would not ever operate. However Eurostar still owns the rights to reinstate several paths in the future if desired.

== Rolling stock ==
The trains to operate all these services were built at the same time as the Channel Tunnel was under construction in the late 1980s to early 1990s. The London–Paris–Brussels ("Three Capital" Class 373/1) trains are owned in groups by Eurostar International (subsidiary of LCR), SNCF and NMBS/SNCB but have been operated as a common pool. They consist of 18 coaches in a fixed formation. Seven shorter 14-coach North of London 373/3 were also constructed for the regional services at a cost of £180 million. All seven are owned by Eurostar International having been transferred from British Rail. Following the non-start of regional services, the trains were stored at North Pole depot in west London. Six of the seven trains have seen use at various times since.

Between 2000 and 2005, British East Coast Main Line operator Great North Eastern Railway used three train sets to provide additional domestic capacity. Branded White Rose after the White Rose of Yorkshire, sets 3301–3306 received a deep-blue livery using vinyl wraps, with 3307–3314 being stripped of their Eurostar logos to fulfill the roster when the GNER-branded sets were unavailable. On occasions a GNER vinyled half set would operate with an unvinyled half set. Initially the GNER White Rose services ran between London King's Cross and York, then, after clearance was given, between London and Leeds. The units were not permitted to be used on services north of York due to loading gauge restrictions in the Newcastle area. The sets continued to be maintained with the other Eurostar units at North Pole depot, where they returned to storage in 2005 following the end of the GNER lease.

During the last 2000s, numerous train sets were leased to SNCF, who used them on its regular high speed services in France.

Set 3313/14 was used during acceptance testing on section 1 of High Speed 1 and in the process of over-speed testing, set a new UK rail speed record of 334.7 km/h (208 mph) in 2003. The set was named Entente Cordiale and has seen use as a VIP charter train, having transported the Queen on a state visit to France and to the Entente Cordiale anniversary celebrations during 2004. On 12 June 2007, the unit was used to carry International Olympic Committee inspectors from Stratford International to London St Pancras, as a demonstration for Olympic Javelin services in 2012.
