= General utility van =

Enclosed railway wagon used by British Rail to carry mail and parcels

British Rail general utility van
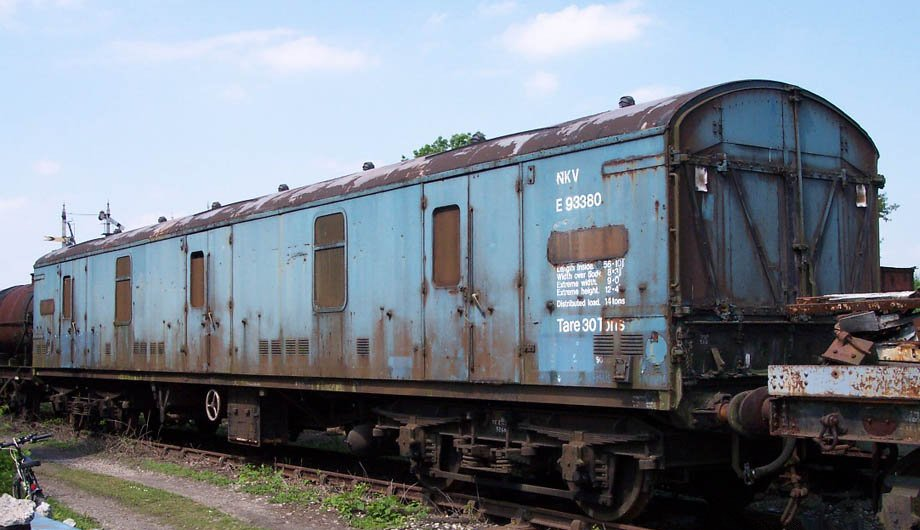
- BR Mk 1 GUV in original form and standard Rail Blue livery
- In service: 1956–present
- Manufacturers: BR York Wagon Works; BR Doncaster Works; BR Glasgow Works; Pressed Steel Company
- Family name: British Railways Mark 1
- Constructed: 1956–1960
- Number built: 907
- Capacity: 14 tonnes (13.8 long tons; 15.4 short tons)
- Operators: British Rail; Rail Express Systems; Railtrack; First Great Western; FM Rail; Colas Rail

Specifications
- Car length: 57 ft 0 in (17.37 m)
- Width: 8 ft 6 3/4 in (2.61 m)
- Height: 12 ft 4 in (3.76 m)
- Maximum speed: 70–100 mph (113–161 km/h), later restricted to 90 mph (145 km/h)
- Weight: 30 tonnes (29.5 long tons; 33.1 short tons)
- Track gauge: 4 ft 8 1/2 in (1,435 mm)

A general utility van (GUV) is a type of rail vehicle built by British Rail primarily for transporting mail and parcels. They were used by both Rail Express Systems and Railtrack. Colas Rail and some train operating companies still use them.

== British Rail ==
=== Fleet details ===
Number range	Previous number range	TOPS code	Primary use	Notes
80250-80259		NPX	Post Office van	Converted from 940xx range
93078-93984	86078-86984	NJ or NK	Mail van	
94000-94034	85500-85534	NLX	Newspaper van	Converted from 86xxx range
94050-94078		NMV	Newspaper van	Converted from 93xxx range
94100-94229		NKA	Mail van (high-security)	Rebuilt from 93xxx, 951xx and 953xx ranges
95100-95199		NOX	Mail van (100 mph)	Converted from 93xxx range
95350-95374		NOX	Mail van (100 mph)	Converted from 93xxx range
95715-95763		NOA	Mail van (High-security)	Rebuilt from 951xx range
96100-96195		NX	Motorail van	Converted from 93xxx range
96210-96218		NPA	Motorail van (110 mph)	Converted from 961xx range
96602-96609		NVA	Motorail van	Rebuilt from 961xx range in 1999 for use by First Great Western on daylight trains and the Night Riviera to Penzance until 2005, briefly used by FM Rail and later sold to Colas Rail, used as brake force runners on Network Rail trains since 2015

== Livery examples ==
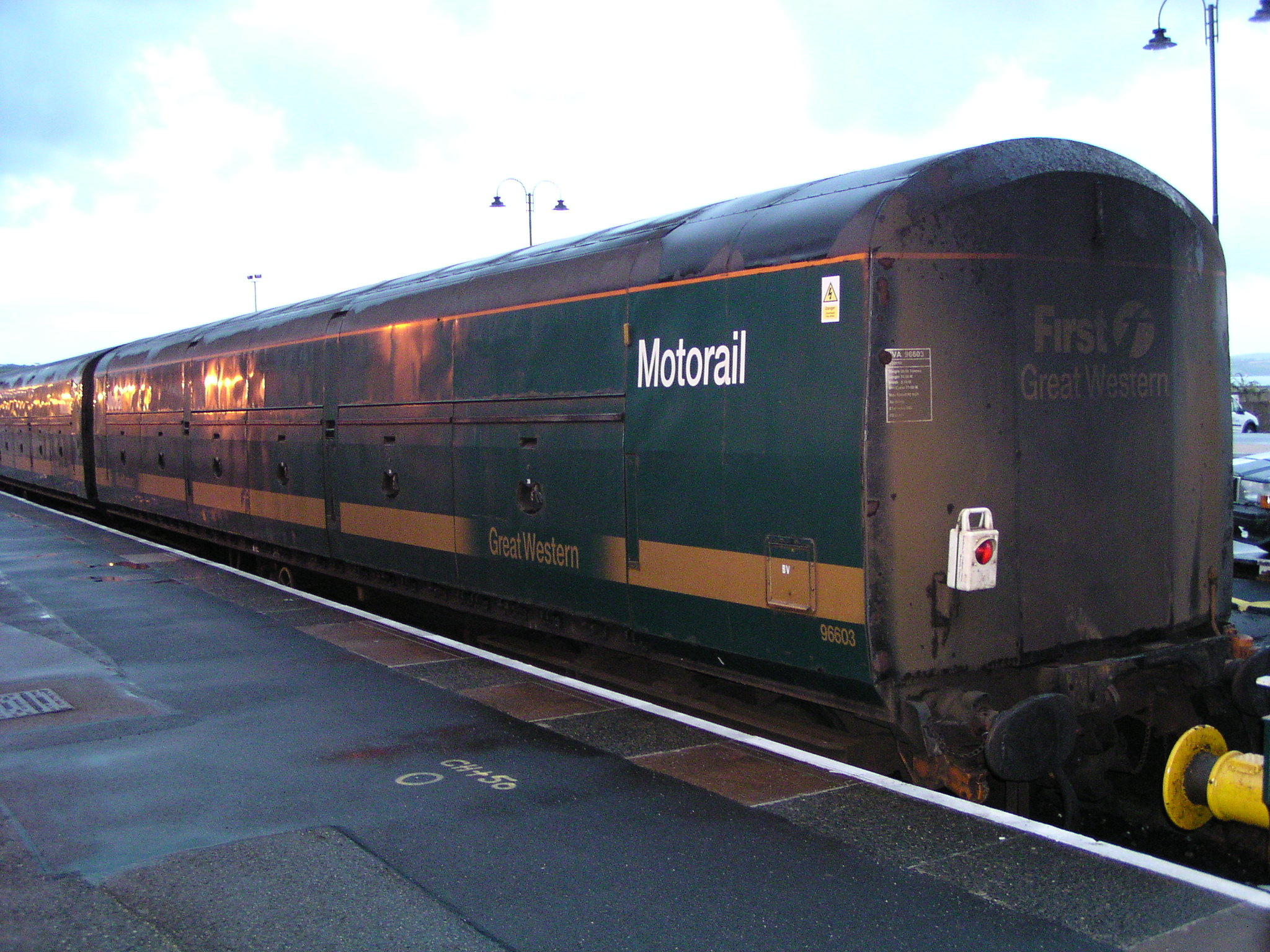
NVA 96603 at Penzance. This vehicle is a Motorail van operated by First Great Western on the Night Riviera

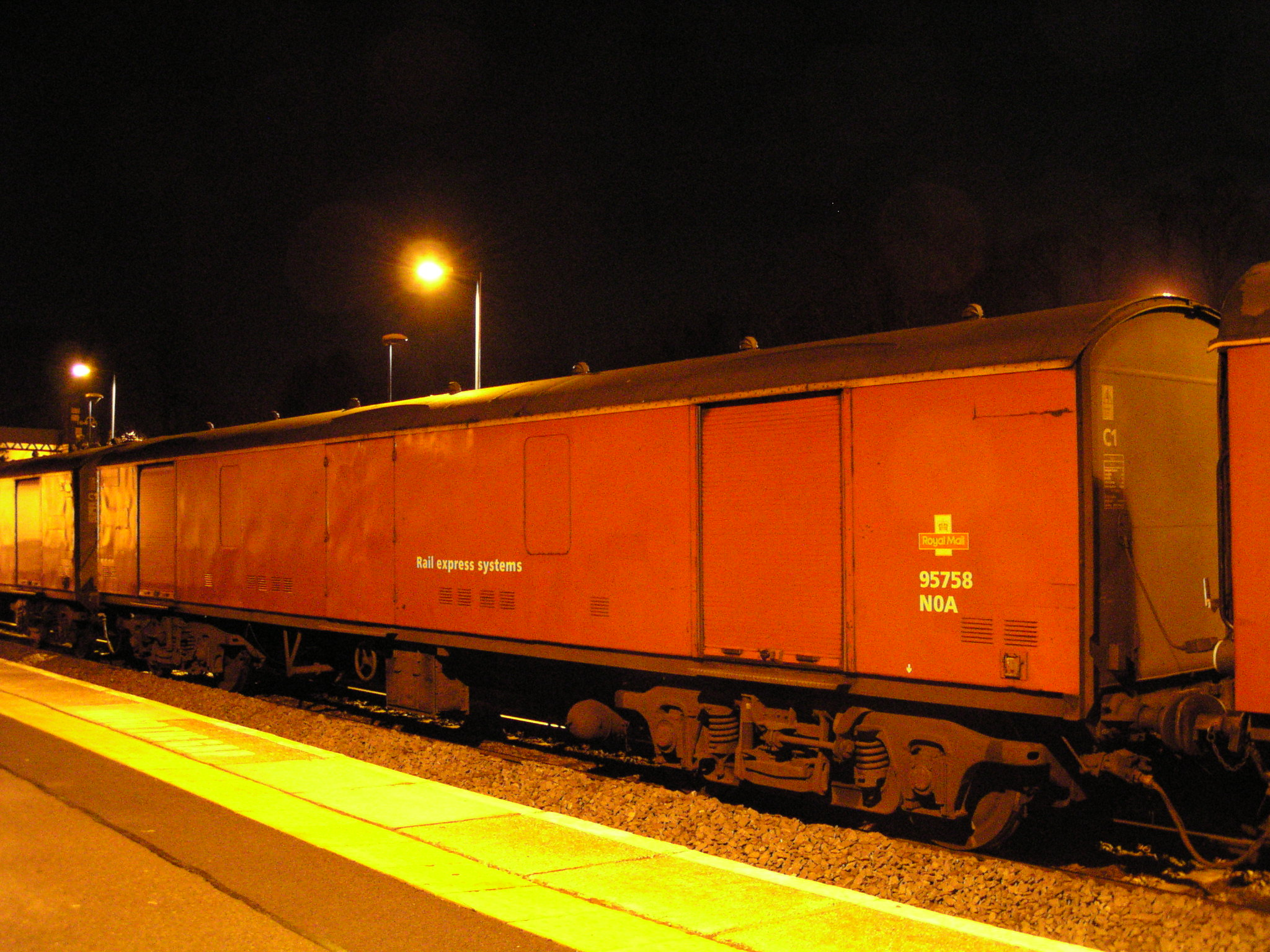
NOA 95758 at Cheltenham Spa . This vehicle is a high-security Royal Mail van and is painted in unbranded Rail Express Systems livery.

== Preservation ==
Many GUVs have found new uses on preserved lines in the UK either stored and kept as coaches or converted for uses as different things.

Number	Location	Image	Type	Livery	Status	Notes
86129	Great Central Railway (Nottingham)		NLX	lined maroon		
86565	Great Central Railway (Nottingham)		NLX	BR Blue	Used as store	
86696	Midland Railway – Butterley		NLX	Maroon	Used as store	
93180	Midland Railway - Butterley		NJ or NK	BR Blue	Used as store	
93226	Mid-Norfolk Railway		NJ or NK	Rail Blue	Static or Stored	
93380	Midland Railway - Butterley		NJ or NK	BR Blue	Used as store	
93381	Midland Railway - Butterley		NJ or NK	BR Blue	Used as store	
93701	Battlefield Line Railway		NJ or NK	Rail Blue	Stored	
94062	Northampton and Lamport Railway		NJV	Rail Blue		
94071	Northampton and Lamport Railway		NJV	Rail Blue		
94102	Rushden, Higham and Wellingborough Railway		NKA			
94148	Helston Railway		NKA	Rail Express Systems (RES) Red	In use as shop and mechanical store	
96100	Tyseley			Chocolate		'REG' ('Range-Extending GUV'). Converted for use as a water carrier for mainline steam railtours. (originally 86734).
96927	Plym Valley Railway		Motorail Van	BR Carmine & Cream	Stored	
96887	Plym Valley Railway		Motorail Van	RES Red	Stored	

== PMV ==
The Southern Railway used the designation PMV (Parcels and Miscellaneous Van).
