= Roger Salmon (banker) =

Roger Salmon came to prominence as an investment banker and became the first Director of Passenger Rail Franchising, who presided over the creation of the franchising system for the newly privatised British railway system. He is the father of Felix Salmon. He became bursar of King's College, Cambridge, was suspended in 2004, but the college was forced to pay compensation after conceding 'that Roger Salmon "acted with propriety and complete integrity" throughout his time at the college'.
