= British Rail Mark 4 =

Type of British railway carriage

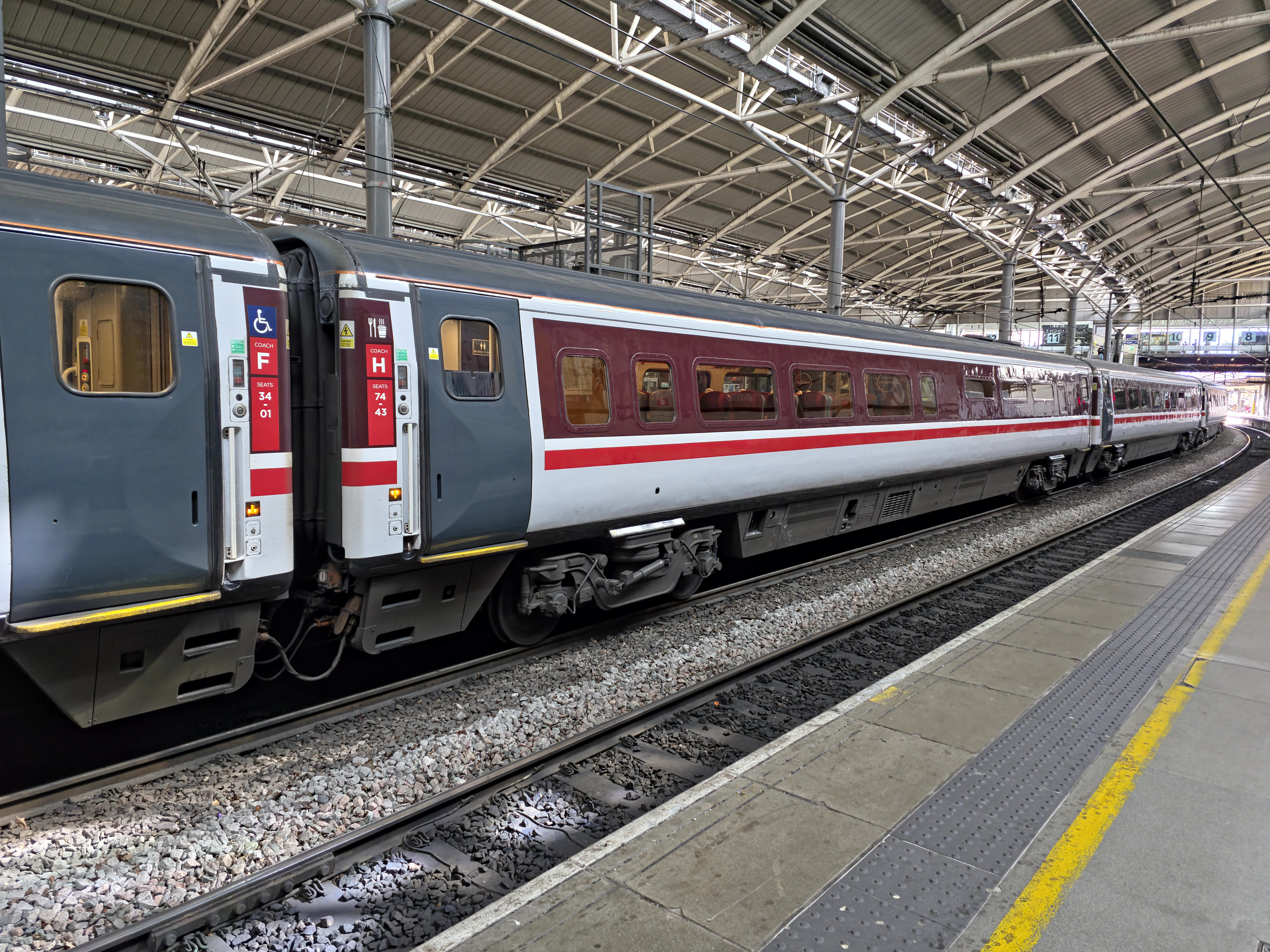
- London North Eastern Railway Mark 4 carriages at Leeds

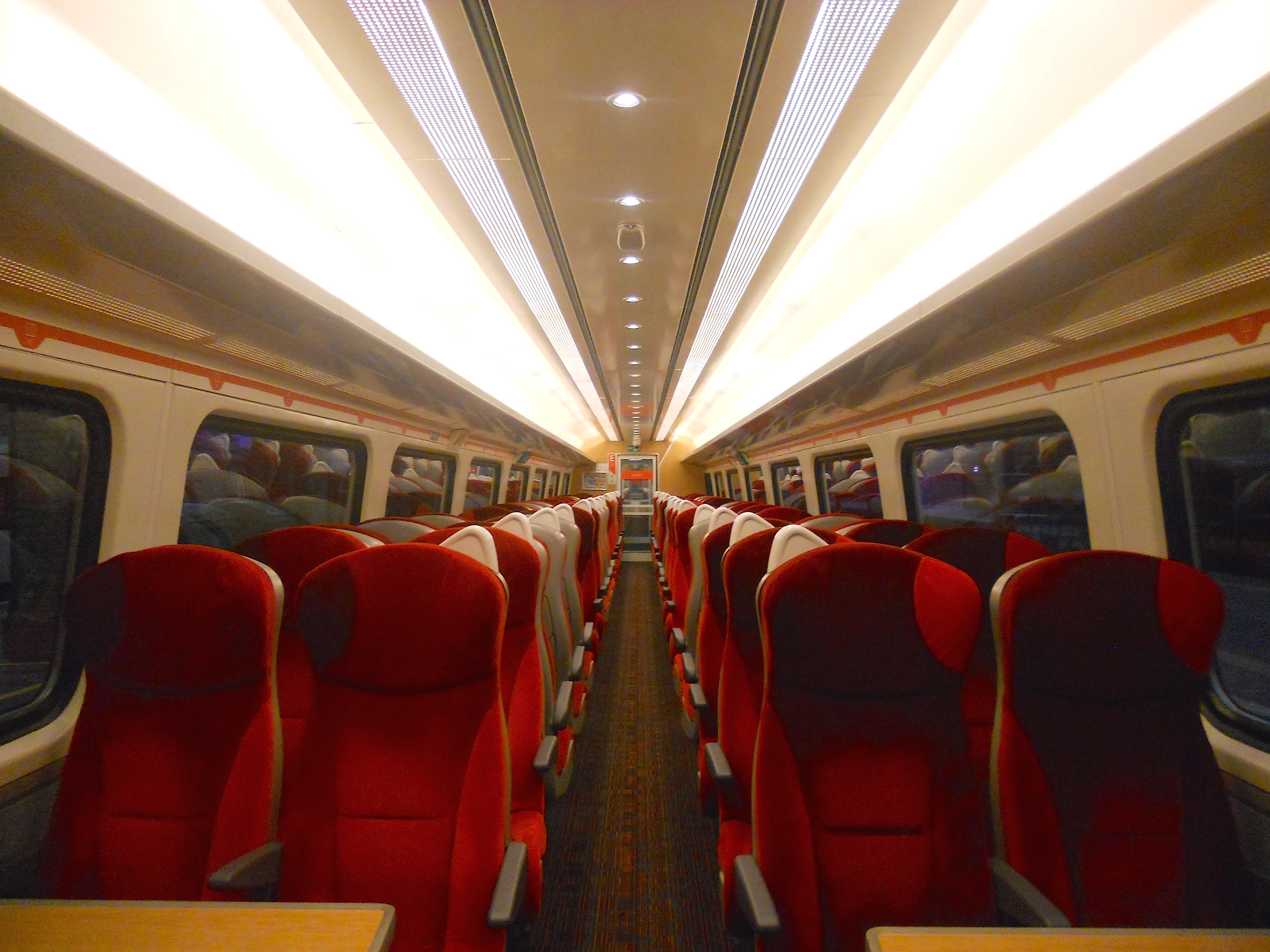
- The interior of Standard Class aboard a Virgin Trains East Coast refurbished Mark 4 TSO vehicle
- In service: 1989 - present
- Manufacturer: Metro-Cammell
- Built at: Washwood Heath, Birmingham
- Constructed: 1989 - 1992
- Number built: 314
- Number in service: 144
- Number scrapped: 19
- Formation: 5 or 9 carriage sets
- Operators: London North Eastern Railway; Transport for Wales
- Line served: East Coast Main Line

Specifications
- Car body construction: Fully integral, steel monocoque
- Car length: 23 m (75 ft 6 in) over buffers (23.4 m (76 ft 9 in) over couplings)
- Width: 2.73 m (8 ft 11 in) (over body)
- Height: 3.79 m (12 ft 5 in) (rail to roof)
- Doors: Hinged plug, pneumatically operated
- Maximum speed: 140 mph (225 km/h)
- Weight: 39.9–43.5 tonnes (39–43 long tons; 44–48 short tons)
- Bogies: SIG BT41A
- Braking systems: Triple axle mounted discs, pneumatically operated
- Track gauge: 1,435 mm (4 ft 8 1/2 in) standard gauge

The British Rail Mark 4 is a class of passenger carriages built for use in InterCity 225 sets on the East Coast Main Line between King's Cross, Leeds and Edinburgh. Withdrawals began in 2019, with some being sold for further use with Transport for Wales between Cardiff and Holyhead.

== History and construction ==
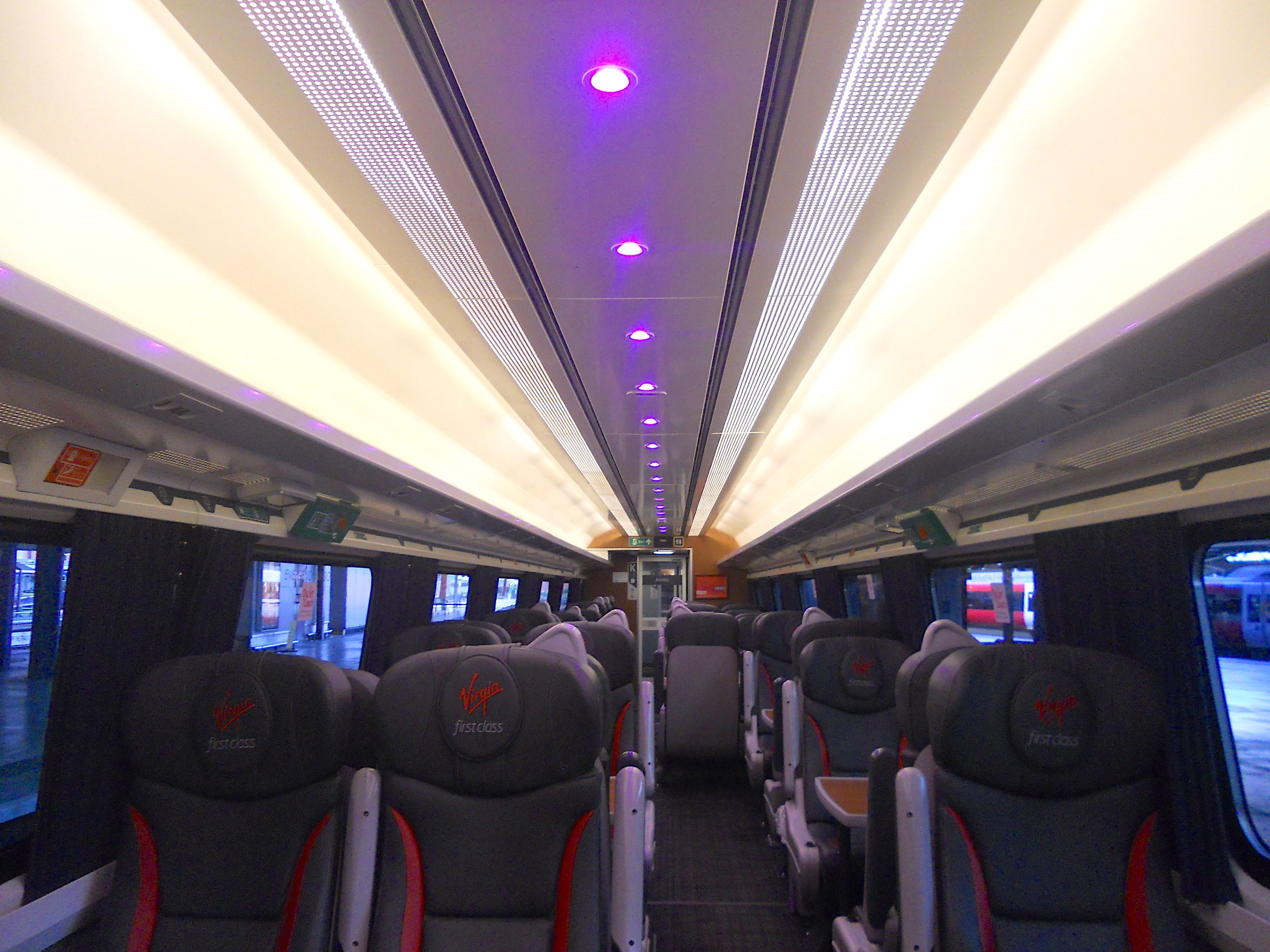
The interior of First Class aboard a Virgin Trains East Coast refurbished Mark 4 FO vehicle

A small build compared with the Mark 2 and Mark 3 designs, 314 Mark 4 coaches were built between 1989 and 1992 by Metro-Cammell's Washwood Heath factory to operate services on the newly electrified East Coast Main Line. They were operated by London North Eastern Railway and its predecessors in 30 fixed formations of nine carriages, with a Class 91 locomotive and Driving Van Trailer.

The Mark 4 is an all-steel coach incorporating a number of improvements over the Mark 3 stock - notably the inclusion of automatic push-button operated plug-type doors, in place of manually operated slam-doors, fully sealed gangways and controlled emission toilets (CET). Body shells were built by British Rail Engineering Limited (BREL) and Società Italiana Ernesto Breda.

After a period of evaluation in 1988, Swiss SIG type BT41A bogies were selected rather than BREL Type T4 bogies when BREL could not provide commercial guarantees on the demanding lateral ride comfort required for 140 mph (230 km/h) running (BT41B/C refer to the bogie types used on the Mk4 DVT).

However, during the first year of operation in 1989, complaints were made about the "lively" ride of the coaches. This required modifications to the damper and spring rates of the bogies and the fitting of inter-coach car coupler dampers to improve damping between the vehicles. Disabled access was another priority of the design, so the door vestibules were enlarged to allow a larger turning circle for a wheelchair. With continually increasing levels of overcrowding, the 'gangway passenger' had become an important consideration, so the vestibule environment was improved with carpeted walls, better lighting, sealed gangways, and carriage doors plus four flip-down seats per vestibule (since removed and replaced with bench style perch seats).

Many of these innovations came from the abandoned Advanced Passenger Train, upon which the Mark 4 was heavily based. This influence was most obvious with the profiled sides, intended to allow the retrofitting of tilt-equipped bogies derived from the APT. This would have allowed up to 6° of tilt; modified coaches would have been designated Mark 4 T, but this plan was abandoned in January 1986. The business case for the Mark 4 also anticipated their operation on the West Coast Main Line as a follow-on order after the East Coast Main Line electrification, but after the failure of the InterCity 250 project to gain Treasury support, British Rail ordered a small number of Class 90 locomotives to supplement existing locomotives on the West Coast Main Line.

The Mark 4 has gained widespread praise for its exceptional crashworthiness, something that was proven in the Hatfield and Selby crashes, where experts identified the integral construction of the vehicles as being a key factor in restricting the death toll.

The Class 158 and Class 159 diesel multiple units, although superficially similar, are not based on the Mark 4 bodyshell; the Mark 4 is derived from the Class 156.

The Iarnród Éireann Mark 4 push-pull carriages, introduced on the Irish railway system in mid-2006, are of a different design; they were manufactured by the Spanish manufacturer CAF.

The Mark 4 was the first British Rail vehicle not to use Rail Alphabet typeface for interior signage and operating notices.

Via Rail Canada's Renaissance fleet of inter-city and sleeper coaches are derived from British Rail's Mark 4. They were built for the abortive Nightstar services to Europe and were adapted by Bombardier Transportation to meet Canadian requirements.

== Project Mallard ==
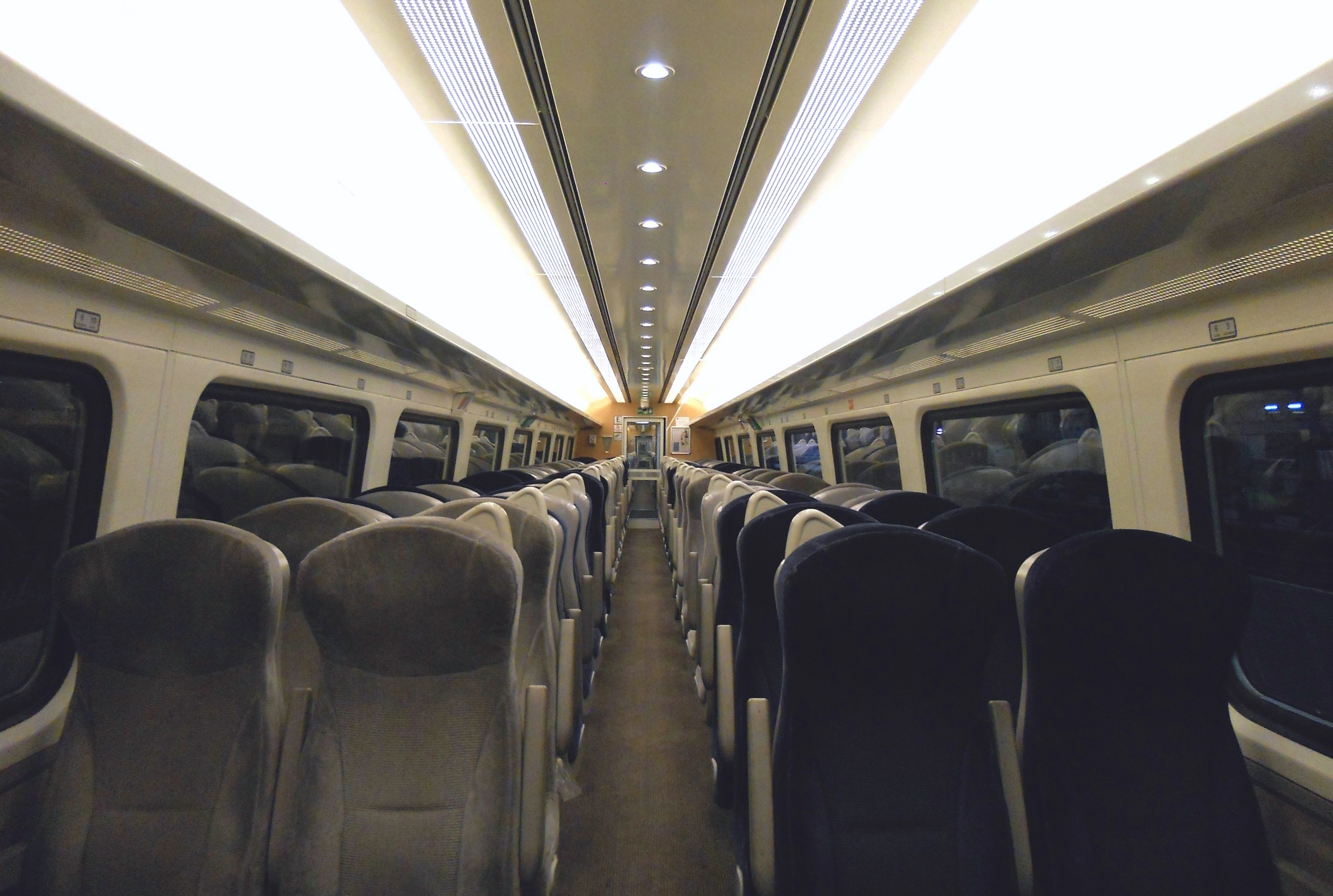
The interior of Standard Class aboard a GNER 'Project Mallard' refurbished Mark 4 TSO vehicle

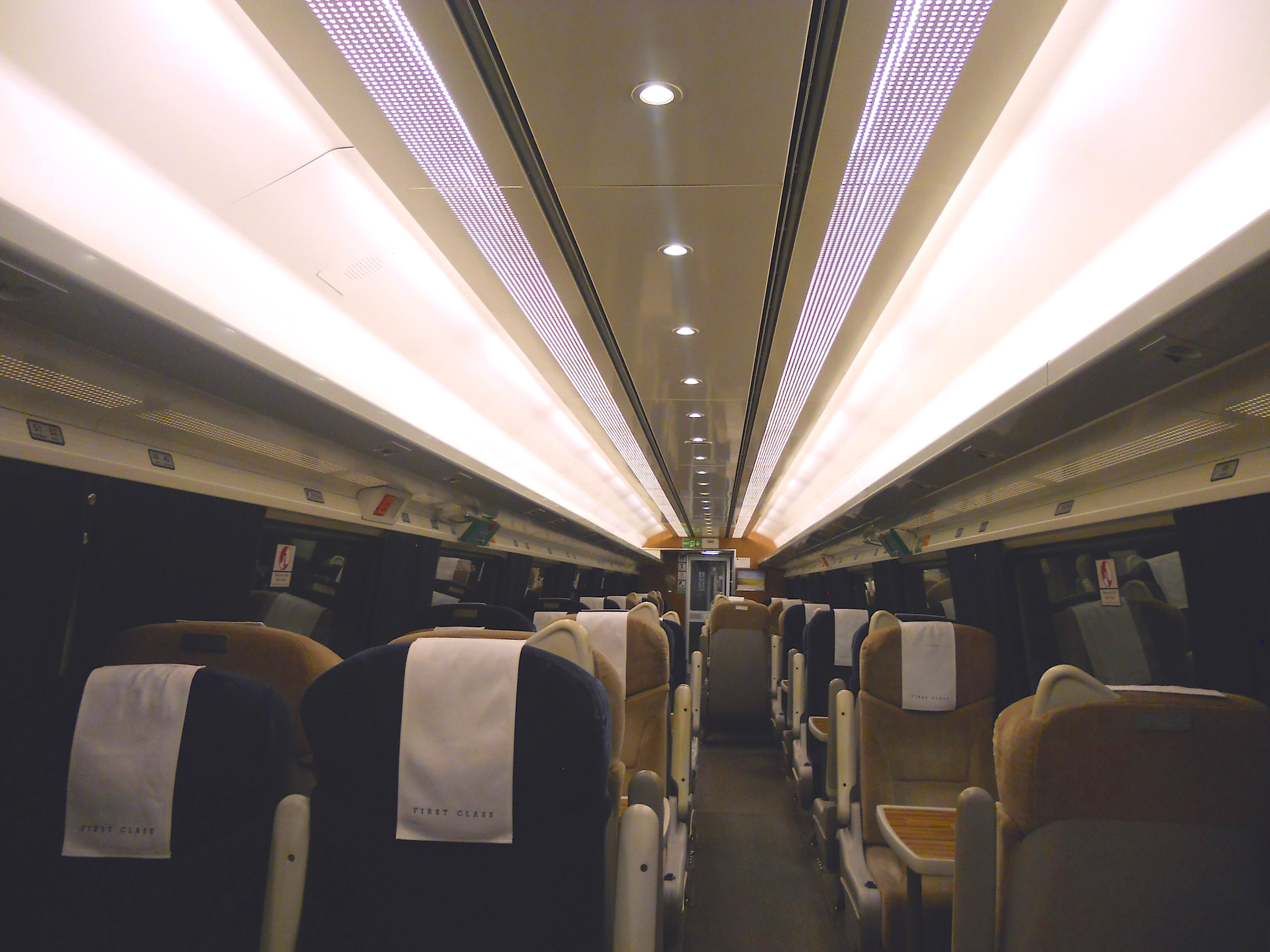
The interior of First Class aboard a GNER 'Project Mallard' refurbished Mark 4 FO vehicle

Between October 2003 and November 2005, Bombardier Transportation, under contract from GNER, rebuilt and refurbished the carriages under Project Mallard. Trains with rebuilt coaches became known as Mallards to distinguish them from unrefurbished sets during the upgrade programme, named after the steam locomotive Mallard, built in the 1930s by the London and North Eastern Railway and holder of the world speed record for steam locomotives.

The Mallard refit gave the coaches all-new interiors with new seats, carpeting and power points at every seat. The vestibule areas lost their flip-down seats near the entrances, with perch-type seats being put in their place. The buffet coach was turned around with first class seating converted to standard. Wheelchair-width doors were fitted and the seating capacity was increased by fitting airline-style seats in place of the previous groupings of pairs of seats facing each other across a table.

Additionally, GNER introduced WiFi internet connectivity as a trial from December 2003 and then into service from April 2004, making it the first service of its kind in the United Kingdom. Prior to National Express East Coast (NXEC) taking over the franchise in December 2007, WiFi was free in first class and chargeable in standard class; under the new NXEC franchise access, it became free for all passengers. In October 2010, under East Coast operation, charges for standard class passengers were reintroduced.

All coaches were revinyled in East Coast livery with the last completed in April 2013. They were revinyled in Virgin Trains East Coast livery in 2015. In February 2016, a refurbishment programme called Plush Tush commenced with new seat covers, carpets and purple mood lighting in First Class.

== Future ==
The Mark 4s were largely replaced on the East Coast Main Line by Class 801s in 2019/20. Virgin Trains East Coast were to retain seven or eight nine-carriage sets to operate extra services to Edinburgh. Virgin Trains East Coasts' successor LNER later stated this plan had been cancelled. In September 2020, Eversholt Rail Group and London North Eastern Railway extended their lease to 10 by 2023. In addition, there are options to make it operational until 2024. It will be overhauled by Wabtec at Doncaster Works.

Grand Central planned to use Mark 4 coaches (5x5 coaches + DVT sets) on their London Euston to Blackpool North services; however, these services were abandoned on 10 September 2020, due to the impact of COVID-19 on passenger numbers.

Twelve Mark 4 carriages were refurbished for use by Transport for Wales on an expanded Holyhead to Cardiff Premier Service from June 2021.

In 2021, Transport for Wales purchased these carriages from Eversholt Rail Group along with the carriages that had been refurbished for use by Grand Central; this brought its fleet to 37.

Grand Union proposed to operate Mark 4s on its London Paddington to Cardiff Central services. This plan was scrapped in favour of using newly procured Class 802 bi-mode units from Hitachi, though this never materialised as the Department for Transport ruled against Grand Union's proposal. Grand Union have also proposed to use them on other services along the West Coast Mainline from London Euston to Stirling, replacing the Class 91 locomotives with brand new Class 93 'Euro-Dual' tri-mode locomotives for use on non-electrified lines. As a supplement, Grand Union stated on their official website that they will be leased Class 22x units (Class 220, 221, 222) from EMR and Avanti West Coast (Arriva CrossCountry will not be leasing their units). In September 2024, the plan was completely scrapped after Grand Union was bought out by FirstGroup.

== Preservation ==
As of Friday 6 February 2026, Two Mark 4 coaches number 11412 & 11426 were purchased from Beacon Rail have been preserved by 225 Preservation
