= Renaissance (railcar) =

Canadian rolling stock

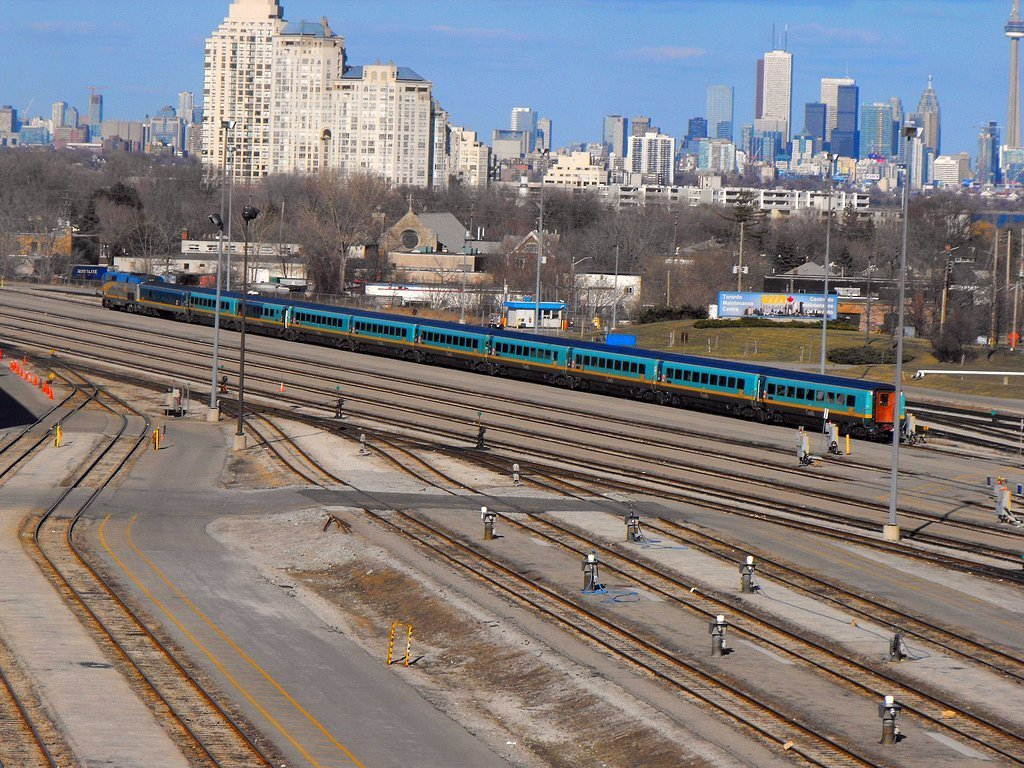
- A GE P42DC with ten Renaissance coaches laying over at the Via Toronto Maintenance Centre.

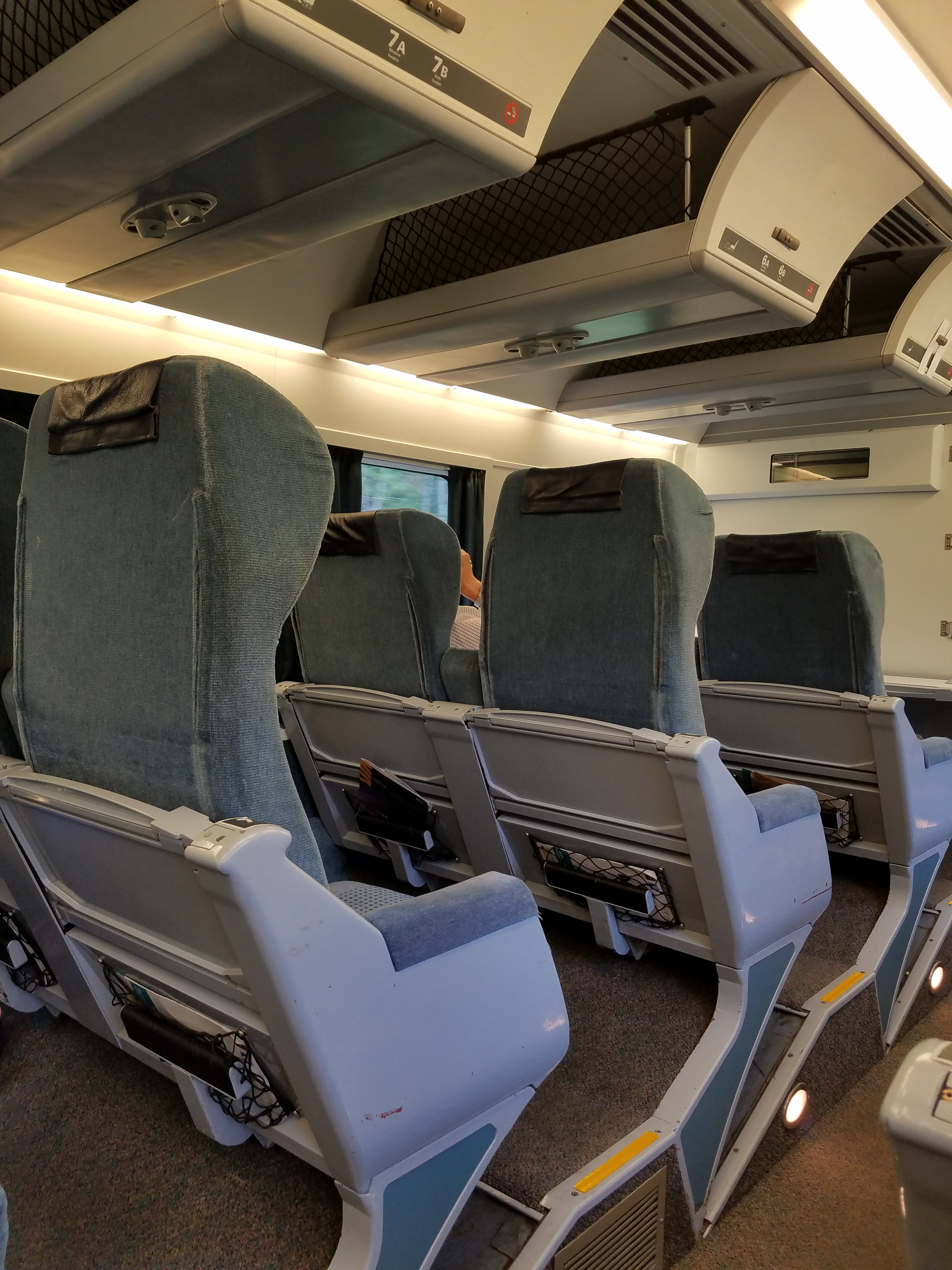
- Interior of a Renaissance coach.
- In service: 2002–present
- Manufacturer: GEC Alsthom
- Built at: Washwood Heath
- Number built: 139
- Capacity: 48 seats (coach, club cars); 48 seats (dining car); 10 double rooms (sleeping cars)
- Operator: Via Rail

Specifications
- Maximum speed: 200 km/h (124 mph)
- Track gauge: 4 ft 8 1/2 in (1,435 mm)

The Renaissance fleet is a set of intercity railroad cars owned and operated by Via Rail Canada.

== History ==
The cars were built by GEC Alsthom in the mid-1990s for the proposed Nightstar overnight service between the United Kingdom and continental Europe via the Channel Tunnel. They are based on the British Rail Mark 4 design, but with heavy weight steel construction (by European standards) to meet safety requirements for the carriages to run through the Channel Tunnel.

In 2000, after the Nightstar concept was abandoned, Via acquired an initial three carriages for trials. In December 2000, the remaining 136 carriages were acquired, entering service in June 2002.

On May 26th, 2024 Via Rail officially retired the Renaissance cars from services on the Windsor-Quebec City Corridor. The cars will remain in revenue service on long-distance routes until a suitable replacement is found which is not expected until at least the early 2030s.

== Accessibility ==
The Council for Canadians with Disabilities successfully sued Via Rail in Council of Canadians with Disabilities v. VIA Rail Canada Inc. over the lack of accessibility of the Renaissance cars. The Canadian Transportation Agency ordered Via to retrofit some of the fleet to ensure the availability of accessible accommodations. Nevertheless, the Renaissance cars remain the least accessible in the fleet.

== Car types ==
Via acquired the entire original 139-car fleet; as designed it comprised 72 sleepers, 47 coaches, and 20 service cars. Via rebuilt fifteen of the sleepers into dining and baggage cars. Thirty-three carriages never entered service, remaining in store at Thunder Bay.

Type	In service	Fleet numbers	Notes	Image
Baggage car	9	7000–7011	Built out of unused sleeping car shells.	
Club car	14	7100–7114	48-seat capacity in a 2+1 configuration.	
Coach	33	7200–7232	48-seat capacity in a 2+1 configuration.	
Lounge car	20	7300–7316; 7354–7359	Via Rail refers to these as "service" cars.	
Dining car	3	7400–7402	48-seat capacity; built out of unused sleeping car shells.	
Sleeping car	27	7500–7589	10 double bedrooms. 29 unfinished shells were stored at Thunder Bay. These have since been scrapped.	
Transition Car	3	7600–7602	Barrier vehicle used to transition between the European Renaissance couplers and the standard knuckle couplers on HEP rolling stock.	
