= York Wagon Works =

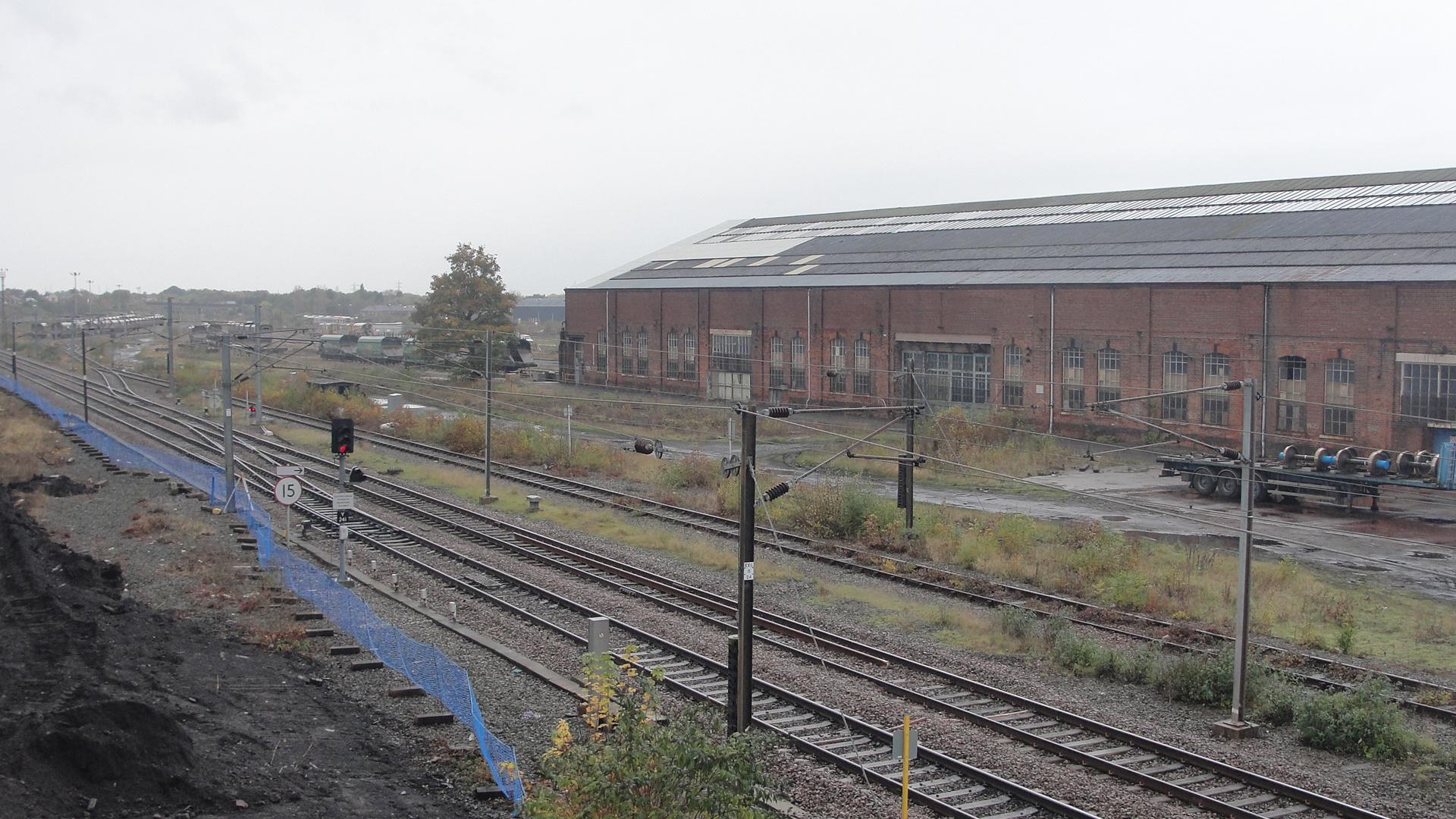
Wagon works from the south (2012)

York Wagon Works was a railway freight wagon works built in York, England, by the North Eastern Railway in 1867. Wagon manufacturing ceased on the site in the 1960s.

As of 2011 the works was used as a maintenance facility by Freightliner (UK).

== History ==
The original railway works in York, the Queen Street Works, York had been established in 1842, and carried out locomotive, carriage and wagon work. The wagon works was a separate building in the north-east of the site, near Queen Street. The building was extended westward in 1864, to give a production capacity of 100 wagons per week.

In 1867 a separate wagon works was opened, north of North junction on the westward main rail line for the north. Expansion led to a site of 17 acres (6.9 ha) with 4.5 acres (1.8 ha) of buildings.

The London and North Eastern Railway took over operation of the works in 1923 and after that date, new wagon building was concentrated on Faverdale Works (Darlington) and Shildon Works (County Durham), with York concentrating more on repairs.

In 1931 a fire destroyed the work's sawmill. Subsequently a lifting shop was built on the sawmill site.

After nationalisation into British Railways under the Transport Act 1947 further rationalisation for wagon production took place. Expected future requirement for wagons was also reduced, a 1956 report did not suggest any wagon works closures, but was superseded by another report in 1959, which recommended more closure and rationalisation, including the closure of the York Wagon Works in 1960. After Richard Beeching became chairman of the British Transport Commission (1961) all workshops came under centralised control from regional control, and a new report was commissioned, which recommended a similar pattern of closure as the 1959 report; York Wagon Works was to close in 1963. The works had closed by 1964.

Maintenance and repair of wagons continued at the site; in the 1980s repair of departmental wagons was being undertaken by Trainload Freight.

Between 1997 and 2002 wagon manufacture was undertaken for English Welsh and Scottish Railway by Thrall Europa (Thrall Car Manufacturing Company) at the Holgate Road carriage works, York.

In 2011 Freightliner UK took over the site for use as a rail vehicle maintenance point. Two minor buildings were demolished as part of a construction of an earth bund south of the main works, c. 2011.
