= Director of Passenger Rail Franchising =

United Kingdom statutory office holder

Office of Passenger Rail Franchising
Non-ministerial government department overview
- Formed: 5 November 1993
- Preceding Non-ministerial government department: British Rail
- Dissolved: 31 January 2001
- Superseding Non-ministerial government department: Strategic Rail Authority
- Jurisdiction: Great Britain
- Headquarters: London, United Kingdom
- Employees: 88 (1996)
- Annual budget: £7.9 million (1996/97)
- Non-ministerial government department executive: Franchising Director

The Director of Passenger Rail Franchising was a statutory office holder in the United Kingdom created in 1993 by the Railways Act 1993 and usually called the Franchising Director. The role lasted from 5 November 1993 until 31 January 2001. The Franchising Director was in charge of an executive agency called the Office of Passenger Rail Franchising (OPRAF). It was superseded by the Strategic Rail Authority.

== Main function ==
The Franchising Director's main function was to sell passenger rail franchises to private sector companies participating in the privatisation of the British railway industry.

On 1 February 2001 the position of Franchising Director was abolished by the Transport Act 2000 and the passenger rail franchising functions were transferred to the newly created Strategic Rail Authority. The SRA was in turn abolished in 2006 and the SRA's franchising functions were taken over by the Secretary of State for Transport.

== Holders of office ==
The first Franchising Director was Roger Salmon, a former investment banker. Salmon was appointed by the Secretary of State for Transport on 8 November 1993 for a term of 5 years. He resigned in 1996.

Salmon was succeeded by John O'Brien, who succeeded in selling 25 rail franchises in under two years (1995–97). The last franchise - ScotRail - was awarded only three weeks before the British general election of May 1997, in which the Labour government of Tony Blair was elected. The Labour Party had promised to halt the privatisation programme if it had won power soon enough, but O'Brien beat them to it.

At the Labour party conference in September 1998, the then Secretary of State for Transport and Deputy Prime Minister John Prescott MP announced that he intended to have a 'spring clean of the regulators', and O'Brien immediately offered his resignation. He had no need to do so, but gained great credit in the railway industry for an honourable offer, which was thought to surprise Prescott. O'Brien was asked to stay on until Prescott had made his decision on the new post-holder.

Prescott intended to set up a new regulatory body for the passenger railway, the Strategic Rail Authority, but he needed legislation to do so. The post of Franchising Director therefore remained to be filled until that legislation could be passed and brought into force. After announcing that Sir Alastair Morton would become the chairman of the SRA, Prescott needed to find a replacement for O'Brien. Morton secured the appointment of Mike Grant, a former colleague of Morton's from his Eurotunnel days and then head of Railtrack's property division.

Grant became Franchising Director in April 2000, and remaining in that post until 1 February 2001 when the Transport Act 2000 was brought into force, abolishing the position of Franchising Director and creating the SRA. Grant was appointed as the first chief executive of the SRA, under Morton's chairmanship. He remained in that role until shortly after Richard Bowker took over as SRA chairman and combined the roles of chairman and chief executive.
