= SuperTrain (exhibition) =

SuperTrain (stylized SUPERTRAIN, formerly the Calgary Model Train Show) is a model train exhibition held in Calgary, Alberta. Held since 1994, it has referred to itself as being the largest model train show in Canada. It is typically held at the Genesis Centre in northeast Calgary.

Both the 2020 and 2021 editions of the event were cancelled due to the COVID-19 pandemic in Alberta, with organizers having cancelled the 2021 edition as conditions "do not look to be sufficiently better".

== Exhibition ==
The show currently runs out of the Genesis Centre in Calgary and previously at the Calgary Stampede Grounds.

SuperTrain exhibits displays made by clubs, individuals as well as commercial shops. The show charges entry to the public. In addition to the exhibits, the show also gives demonstration on how to create dioramas and full train displays. The displays range in size and in gauge. In 2016 Supertrain had from Z scale up to 7.5" gauge displays many of which are in working order. SuperTrain exhibits are judged by the public and official judges appointed by the committee. There are monetary prizes given out at the annual dinner.

=== Clubs that are usually at the show ===
- Alberta Model Engineering Society
- Iron Horse Park Airdrie offers ride on train rides
- O Scale Guild
- Rocky Mountain Garden Railway
- Edmonton N-Scalers - ESMRE
- Calgary LEGO Train Club
- Calgary Free-mo
- Calgary Model Trainmen
- Calgary Model Railway Society
- Carbon Railroad
- Calgary N-Scale Traksters Society (Cantrak)
- Bow Valley Model Railroad Club

=== Commercial entities that come to the show ===
- Calgary Transit
- Revelstoke Railway Museum
- Heritage Park Historical Village
- Rapido (train)

== External websites ==
- www.supertrain.ca
