= Halifax–Sydney train =

Defunct passenger rail service in Nova Scotia

Overview
- Service type: Inter-city rail
- Status: Discontinued
- Locale: Nova Scotia, Canada
- Last service: January 14, 1990
- Successor: Bras d'Or
- Current operator(s): Via Rail
- Former operator(s): Canadian National Railway

Route
- Termini: Halifax, Nova Scotia; Sydney, Nova Scotia
- Stops: 48 (1976); 20 (1989)
- Distance travelled: 473 km (294 mi)
- Average journey time: 7 hours
- Service frequency: 2 daily round trips
- Train number(s): 604, 605, 607, 608 (Halifax–Sydney); 603, 606 (Halifax–Port Hawkesbury)

Technical
- Track gauge: 1,435 mm (4 ft 8 1/2 in)
- Operating speed: 80 mph (128 km/h)
- Track owner(s): Canadian National Railway

The Halifax-Sydney train was a passenger train service operated by the Canadian National Railway and later Via Rail between Halifax and Sydney, Nova Scotia, via Truro and Port Hawkesbury.

The train was discontinued in 1990. From 2000 to 2004, the Bras d'Or ran weekly summer excursion service along much the same route.

== History ==
The route was operated by the Canadian National Railway until 1977, when most of CN's passenger routes were transferred to Via Rail. For most of the train's life under Via Rail, two daily round trips ran the full route between Halifax and Sydney. Not all trains stopped at all stations.

The April 27, 1980, timetable dropped 22 stops, nearly half the itinerary. These were mostly in small communities located just a few miles from retained stops.

On June 3, 1984, a new service pattern took effect. One round trip, trains 604 and 605, ran the entire route on a daily basis. Additionally, train 608 ran from Halifax to Sydney on Fridays and Saturdays, with train 607 returning on Sundays. The remaining days saw trains 603 and 606 run an abbreviated route between Halifax and Port Hawkesbury. The new schedule was billed as enabling same-day round trips from Port Hawkesbury to Truro and Halifax. This timetable also dropped six stops: Avondale, Hopewell, West River, Stewiacke, Shubenacadie, and Elmsdale.

On October 30, 1988, the Stellarton and New Glasgow stops were combined.

On April 30, 1989, trains 603 and 606 were suspended due to track upgrades near Truro. Regular service was planned to resume in late October 1989.

Service was discontinued on January 15, 1990, during a round of severe cuts to the Via Rail network overseen by Benoît Bouchard due to the 1989 budget. In an act of protest, local union leader Victor Tomiczek chained himself to the last train departing Sydney station.

== Later service ==
Passenger service between Halifax and Sydney resumed in 2000 with Via Rail's Bras d'Or, which ran once per week during the summer tourist season. At the time, the line from Truro to Sydney was operated by the Cape Breton and Central Nova Scotia Railway. The train was cancelled following the 2004 season. This was the last regularly scheduled passenger train serving Cape Breton Island.
