= Bras d'Or (train) =

Former passenger train in Nova Scotia

Overview
- Service type: Inter-city rail
- Status: Discontinued
- Locale: Nova Scotia, Canada
- Predecessor: Halifax–Sydney train
- First service: 2000
- Last service: 2004
- Current operator(s): Via Rail

Route
- Termini: Halifax, Nova Scotia; Sydney, Nova Scotia
- Average journey time: 10 hours
- Service frequency: Weekly (June-October)

Technical
- Track gauge: 1,435 mm (4 ft 8 1/2 in)
- Track owner(s): Cape Breton and Central Nova Scotia Railway

The Bras d'Or was a summer passenger train service operated by Via Rail in Nova Scotia, Canada, between Halifax and Sydney. From 2000 to 2004, the excursion train ran one round-trip per week in the tourist season of mid-June to mid-October. The route followed the scenic Sydney Subdivision of the Cape Breton and Central Nova Scotia Railway across Cape Breton Island, at times within view of Bras d'Or Lake, after which the train is named.
