= Iron Horse Park Airdrie =

Iron Horse Park is a miniature ridable railway running multiple large scales operated by The Alberta Model Engineering Society. Iron horse park is one of the largest 7 1/2 in (190.5 mm) gauge railways in Canada. Run by volunteers, the park promotes education regarding the engineering surrounding railways, including both modern and old steam engines. The site offers "journeys" including 1/8th scale simulated trip from Airdrie to Vancouver, through Tunnel / Sacred Buffalo Guardian Mountain in the Rocky Mountains.

The park is located in Airdrie, Alberta, on land leased from the city to be used as an educational park. The city signed a lease renewal in 2013 to keep the ride operating until 2027.

The history goes back to 1971 and has moved around Southern Alberta. Previously the raised track was located at Camp Gardner, Alberta. In July 2000, the Calgary Herald reported that vandalism of the miniature railroad had prompted increased security at the park.

The park is open yearly on Sundays from May long weekend to Canadian Thanksgiving weekend, with occasional other special event days.

Scales include:

- Large (over 1.6 km) 7.5 in ground mounted track with switches
- Smaller (900ft) of 1-1/4 in, 2-1/2 in, 3-1/2 in, 4-3/4 in, 5 in, and 7-1/4 in elevated track gauges
