= Via Rail =

Inter-city passenger rail operator in Canada

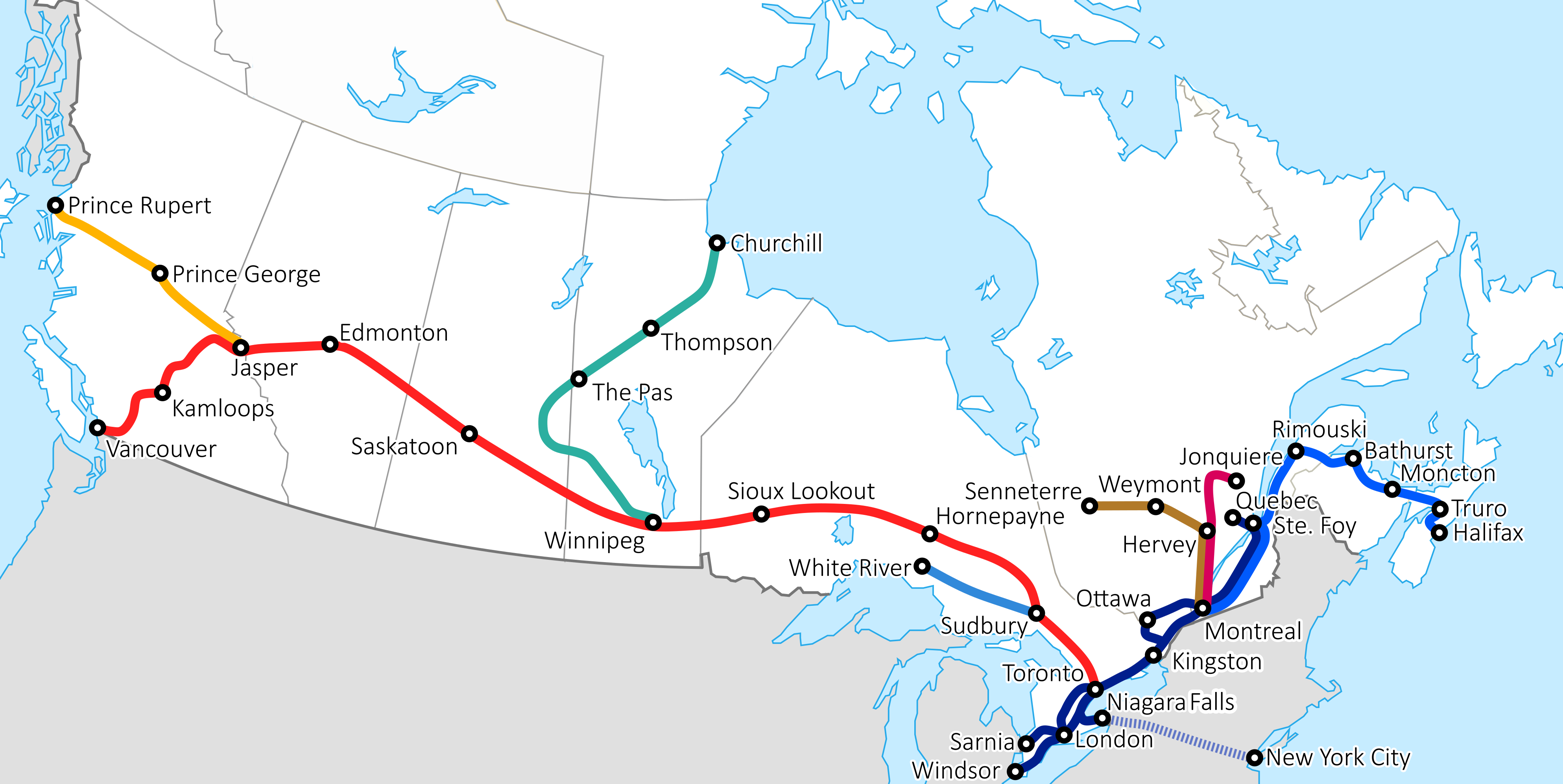
- Map of the Via Rail system

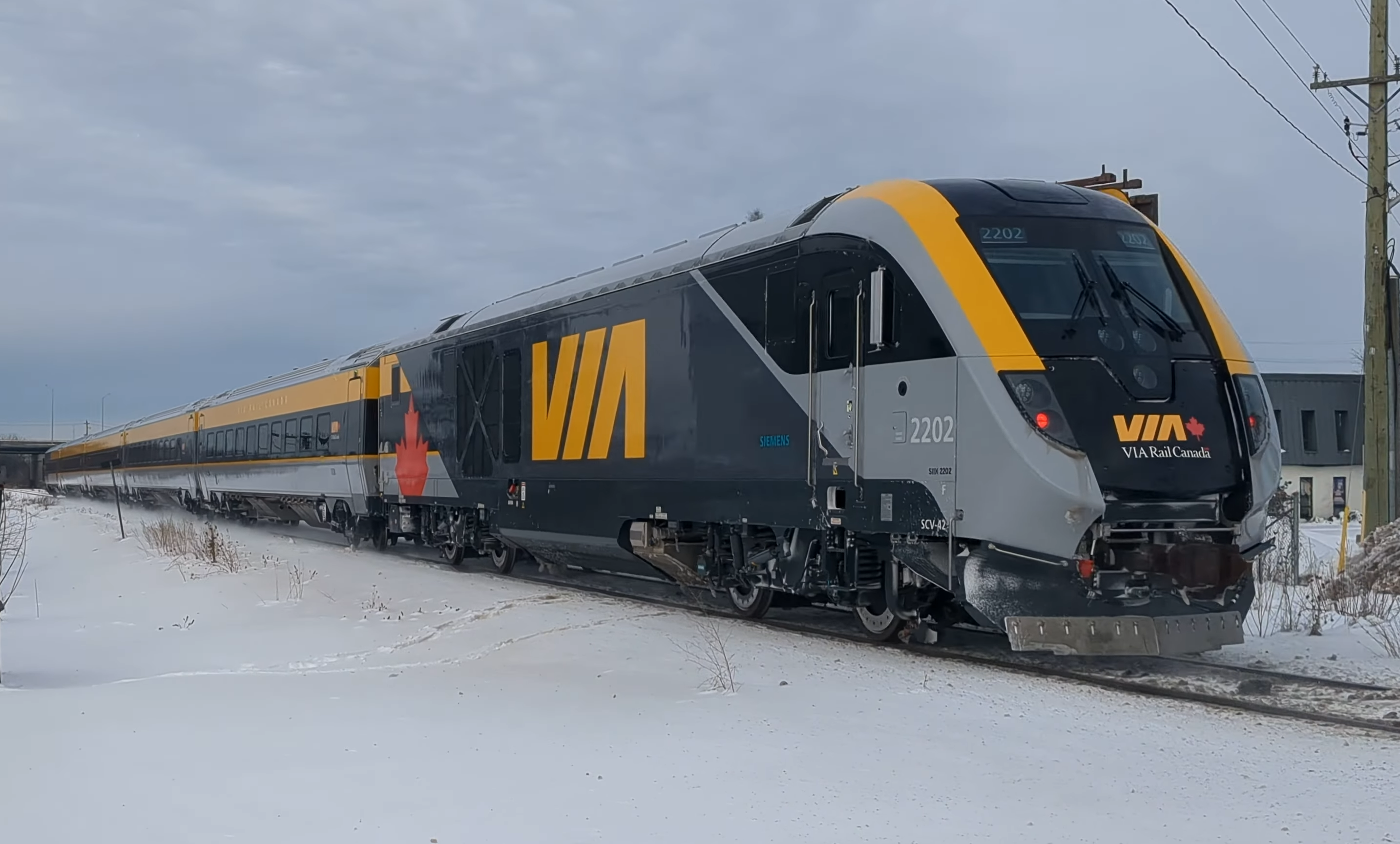
- The Corridor – Via Rail's busiest segment, which runs within Ontario and Quebec

Overview
- Main region: Canada
- Stations called at: 378
- Reporting mark: VIA
- Dates of operation: January 12, 1977–present
- Predecessor: Passenger services operated by the Canadian National Railway and the Canadian Pacific Railway, as well as other smaller companies

Technical
- Track gauge: 1,435 mm (4 ft 8 1/2 in) standard gauge
- Length: 12,500 kilometres (7,800 mi)

Other
- Type: Crown corporation
- Industry: Rail transport
- Founded: January 12, 1977; 49 years ago
- Headquarters: Place Ville Marie, Montreal, Quebec, Canada
- Key people: Jonathan Goldbloom (Chairperson); Mathieu Paquette (President & CEO); Steven MacKinnon (minister responsible)
- Revenue: ▲CA$430.7 million (2023)
- Operating income: ▼CA$−381.8 million (2023)
- Total assets: ▲CA$2.868 billion (2023)
- Number of employees: 3,668 (2023)
- Subsidiaries: Alto
- Website: www.viarail.ca/en

Via Rail Canada Inc. (/ˈviːə/; reporting mark VIA), operating as Via Rail (stylized as VIA Rail), is a Canadian federal Crown corporation that operates intercity passenger rail service in Canada.

As of December 2023, Via Rail operates 406 trains per week across eight Canadian provinces and 12,500 kilometres (7,800 mi) of track, 97 percent of which is owned and maintained by other railway companies, mostly by Canadian National Railway (CN). Via Rail carried approximately 4.1 million passengers in 2023, 96 percent of which were along the Corridor routes connecting the major cities of the Quebec City–Windsor Corridor, and had an on-time performance of 85.4 per cent. Attracting international tourism forms an important part of Via Rail's long distance trans-continental services.

== History ==
=== Background ===
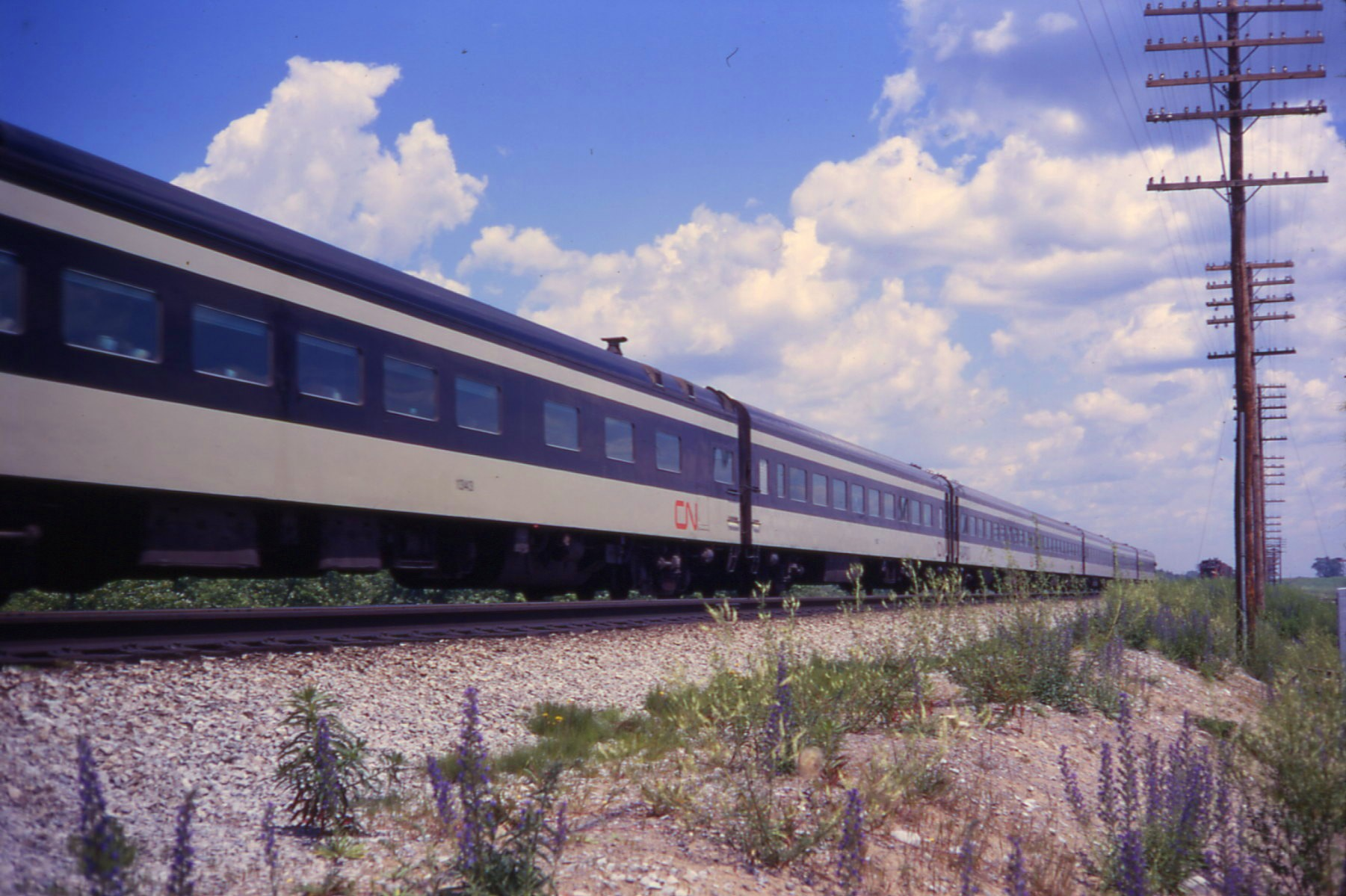
CNR Rapido train cars in Pickering, July 1968. In an effort to attract riders, new train cars were acquired by CN in the 1960s.

Yearly passenger levels on Canada's passenger trains peaked at 60 million during World War II. Following the war, the growth of air travel and the personal automobile caused significant loss of mode share for Canada's passenger train operators. By the 1960s Canadian National Railway (CN) and the Canadian Pacific Railway (CP) found that passenger trains were no longer economically viable. CP sought to divest itself of its passenger trains, but federal government regulators and politicians balked, forcing them to maintain a minimal service through the 1970s, with the government subsidizing up to 80 percent of losses. CN, being a Crown corporation at that time, was encouraged by the federal government and political interests to invest in passenger trains. Innovative marketing schemes such as Red, White, and Blue fares, new equipment such as scenic dome cars and rail diesel cars, and services such as Rapido and the UAC TurboTrain trains temporarily increased numbers of passengers, reversing previous declines.

These increases proved temporary; by 1977, total passenger numbers had dropped below five million. The decline of passenger rail became a federal election issue in 1974 when the government of Pierre Trudeau promised to implement a nationwide carrier similar to Amtrak in the United States. Starting in 1976, CN began branding its passenger services with the bilingual name Via or Via CN. The Via logo began to appear on CN passenger locomotives and cars, while still carrying CN logos as well. That September, Via published a single timetable with information on both CN and CP trains, marking the first time that Canadians could find all major passenger trains in one publication. In 1977, CN underwent a dramatic restructuring when it placed various non-core freight railway activities into separate subsidiaries, such as ferries under CN Marine, and passenger trains under Via Rail which was subsequently renamed Via Rail Canada.

=== Formation and early years ===
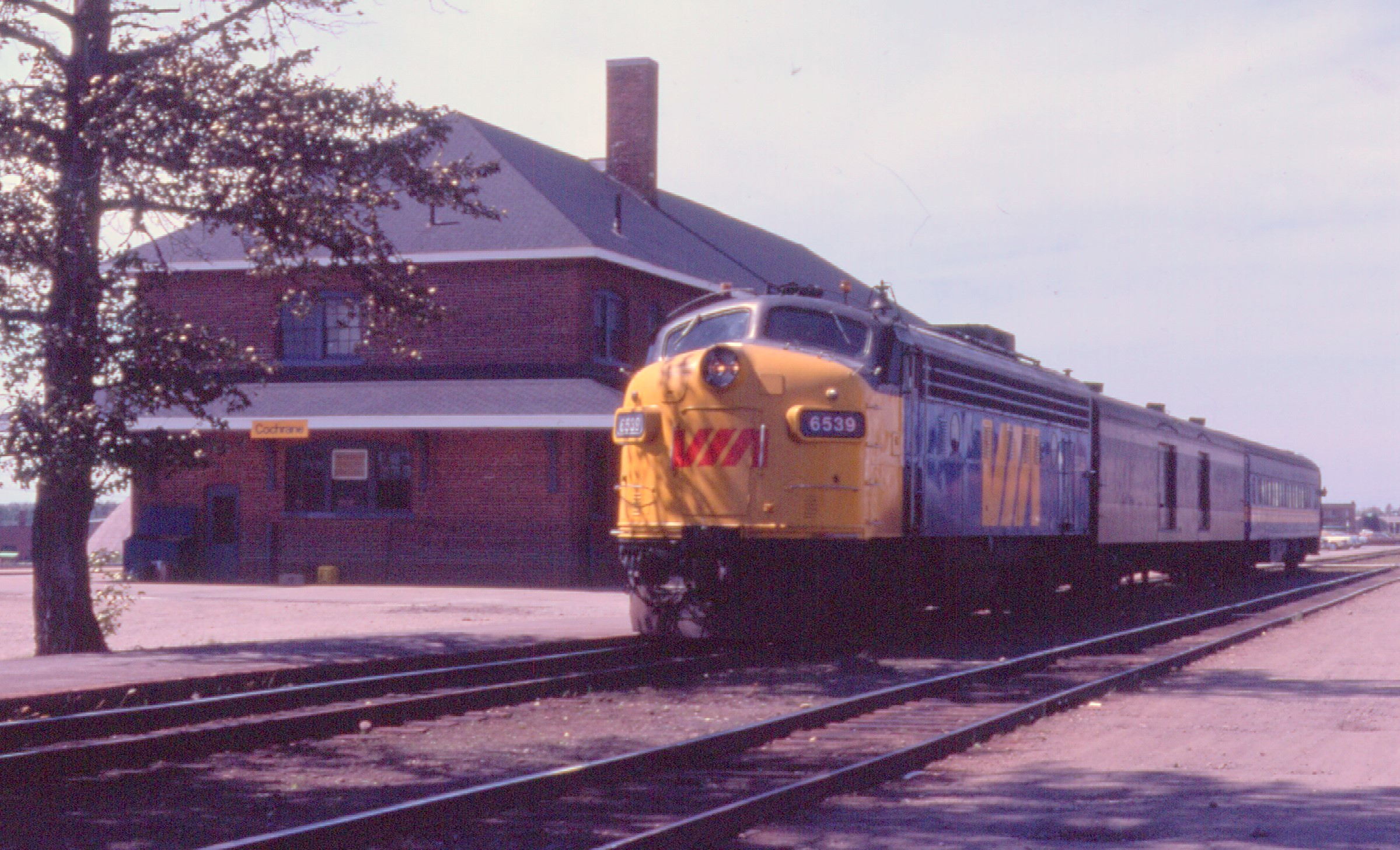
A Via Rail train at Cochrane station in August 1978. Earlier that year, CNR and CPR passenger rail service were spun off into Via Rail Canada.

On January 12, 1977, CN spun off its passenger services as a separate Crown corporation, Via Rail Canada. At its inception, Via acquired all CN passenger cars and locomotives. Following several months of negotiation, on October 29, 1978, Via assumed all CP passenger train operations and took possession of cars and locomotives. Passenger train services which were not included in the creation of Via Rail included those offered by BC Rail, Algoma Central Railway, Ontario Northland Railway, Quebec North Shore and Labrador Railway, various urban commuter train services operated by CN and CP, and remaining CN passenger services in Newfoundland. At this time, Via did not own any trackage and had to pay right-of-way fees to CN and CP, sometimes being the only user of rural branch lines.

Via initially had a tremendous variety of equipment—much of it in need of replacement—and operated routes stretching from Sydney, Nova Scotia, to Prince Rupert, British Columbia, and north to Churchill, Manitoba. Over 150 scheduled trains per week were in operation, including transcontinental services, regional trains, and corridor services.

While Via remains an independent federal Crown corporation mandated to operate as a business, it is hindered by the fact that it was created by an order in council and not from legislation passed by Parliament. Had Via been enabled by legislation, the company would be permitted to seek funding on the open money markets as other Crown corporations such as CN have done in the past. It is largely for this reason that critics say Via—like Amtrak in the United States—is vulnerable to federal budget cuts and continues to answer first to its political masters, as opposed to the business decisions needed to ensure the viability of intercity passenger rail service.

=== 1980s ===
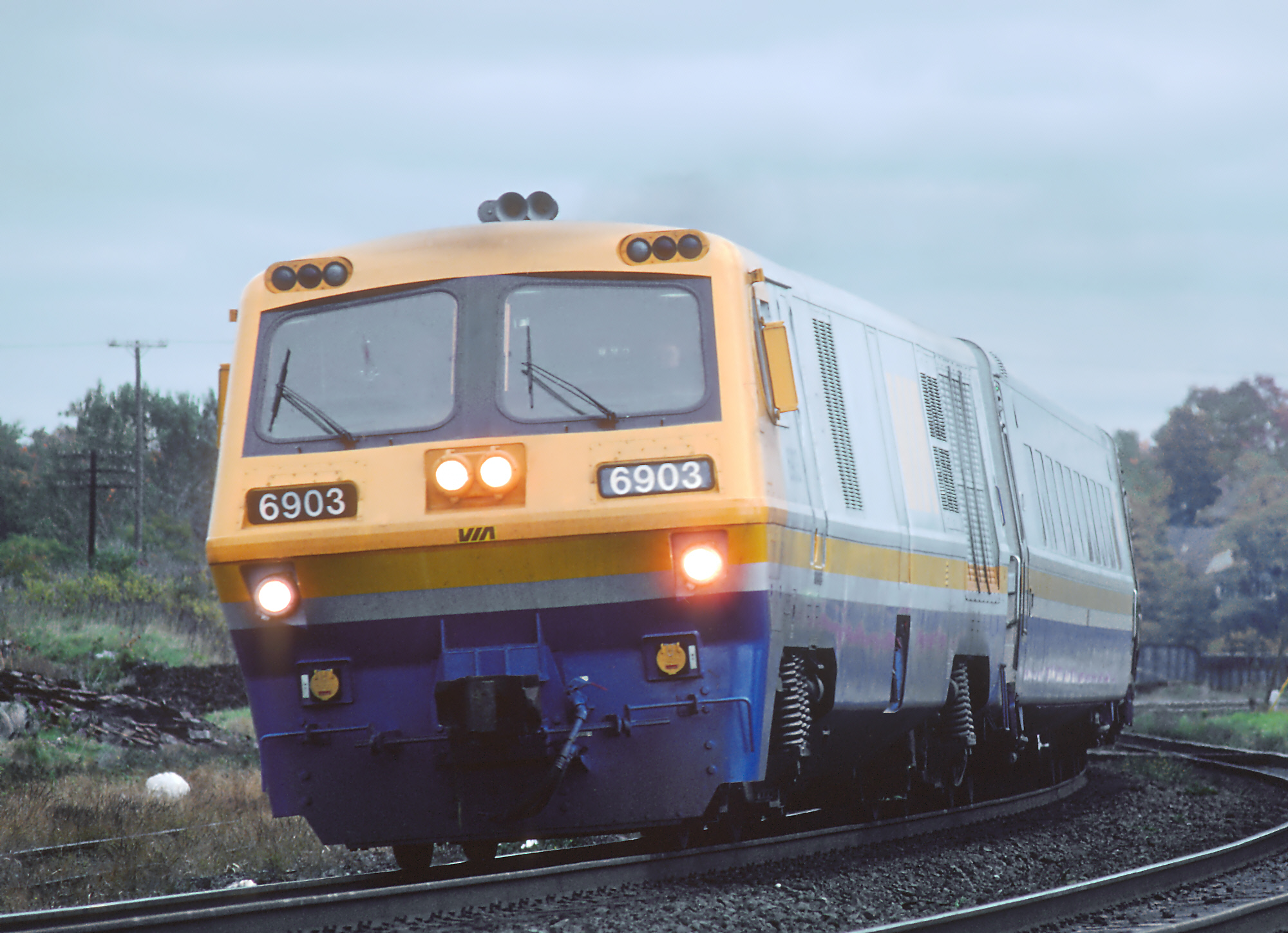
The LRC in Port Hope, October 1981. Via Rail ordered the LRCs in the 1980s to replace its older train cars.

In 1981, Prime Minister Pierre Trudeau's government endorsed Minister of Transport Jean-Luc Pépin's plan which slashed Via's budget, leading to a 40 percent reduction in the company's operations. Frequently sold-out trains such as the Super Continental and the popular Atlantic were discontinued. The retrenchment of the former reduced Via to operating only one transcontinental train, The Canadian.

Via also sought to reduce its reliance on over 30-year-old second-hand equipment and placed a significant order with Bombardier Transportation for new high-speed locomotives and cars which would be used in its corridor trains. The LRC (Light, Rapid, Comfortable) locomotives and cars used advanced technology such as active tilt to increase speed, but proved troublesome and took several years to work out problems (by 1990 only a handful of LRC locomotives remained in service which were subsequently retired by the arrival of the GE Genesis locomotives in 2001).

The election of Brian Mulroney's Progressive Conservative government in 1984 brought an initial friend to Via, when several of Mulroney's commitments included rescinding the Via cuts of 1981 by restoring the Super Continental (under pressure from his western caucus), and the Atlantic (under pressure from his eastern caucus and then-Saint John mayor Elsie Wayne). Prime Minister Mulroney's government gave Via funding to refurbish some of its cars, and purchase new locomotives, this time a more reliable model from General Motors diesel division.

It was during this time on February 8, 1986, that Via's eastbound Super Continental collided with a CN freight train near Hinton, Alberta, as a result of the freight train crew missing a signal light, resulting in 23 deaths.

By the late 1980s, inflation and other rising costs were taking their toll on federal budgets and in the Mulroney government's 1989 budget, Via again saw its budget slashed by $1 billion, surpassing even the 1981 cuts under Trudeau.

=== 1990s ===
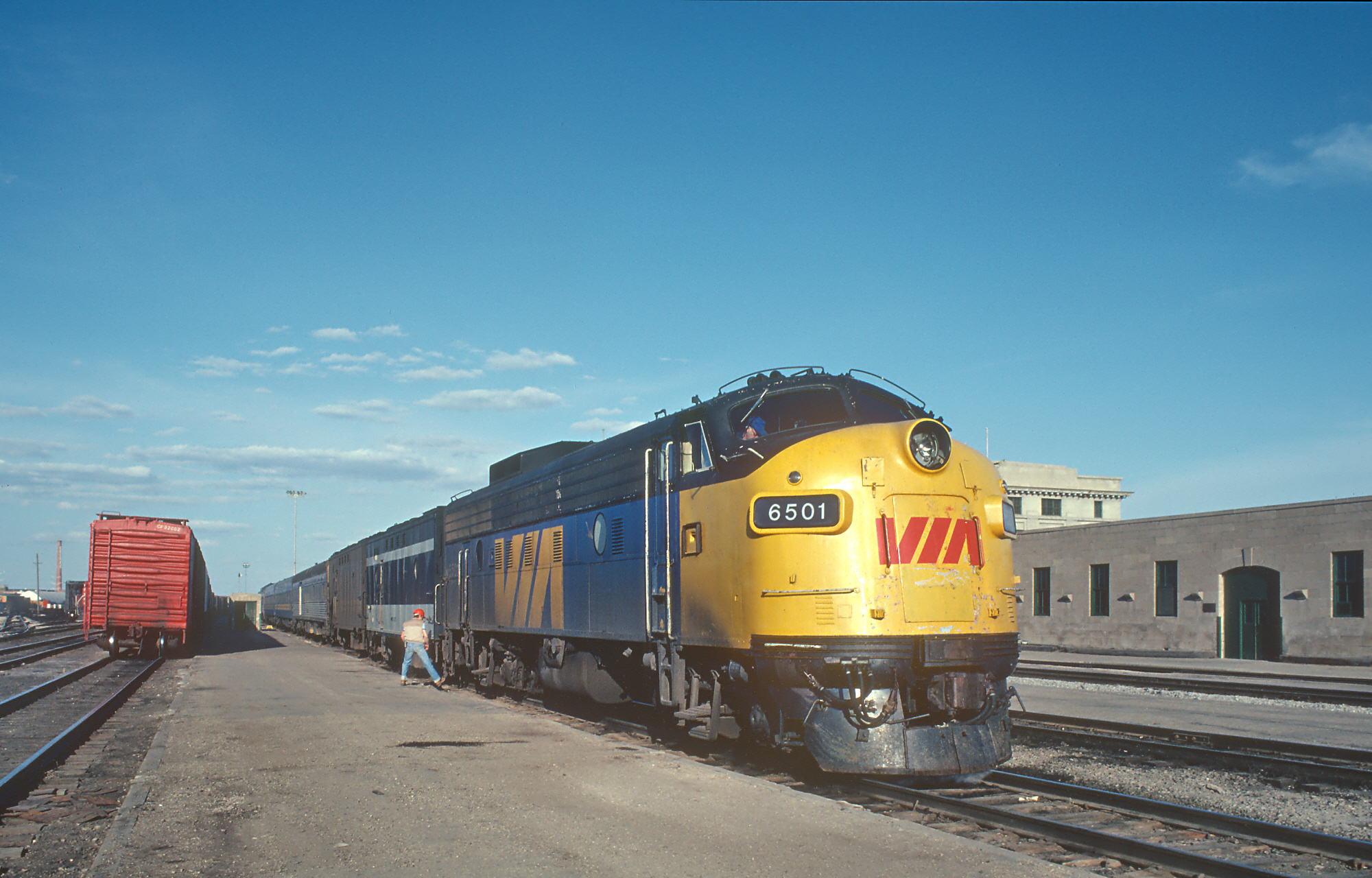
A Via GMD FP7 leads the Canadian in Regina, May 1982. The Canadian was rerouted in the 1990s, ending service to several cities, like Calgary.

Minister of Transport Benoît Bouchard oversaw the reduction in service on January 15, 1990, when Via's operations were reduced by 55 percent. The privatization of CN rail in 1995 also negatively affected service as it resulted in an effective monopoly, with Via trains having to yield to CN trains.

Services such as the Super Continental were again discontinued, along with numerous disparate rural services such as in Nova Scotia's Annapolis Valley and Cape Breton Island, western Canada, and in the corridor. The Canadian was also moved from its home rails on CP to the northerly CN route (previously plied by the Super Continental). The shift to the less populated route between Toronto and Vancouver severed major western cities such as Regina and Calgary from the passenger rail network and flared western bitterness toward the Government of Canada.

The official justification for the rerouting was that the trains would serve more remote communities, but the concentration of ridings held by the Progressive Conservatives along the CN route attracted the charge that the move was chiefly political. Harvie André, one of Alberta's federal cabinet ministers who represented Calgary, stated publicly that he did not care if he never saw a passenger train again in his life.

The Mulroney cuts allowed Via to consolidate its fleet of cars and locomotives, resulting in a fleet of refurbished stainless steel (HEP-1 and HEP-2 rebuilds) and LRC cars, as well as rationalizing its locomotive fleet with GM and Bombardier (LRC) units.

Via was not spared from further cutbacks in Jean Chrétien's Liberal government elected in 1993. Minister of Finance Paul Martin's first budget in 1994 saw further Via cuts which saw the popular Atlantic dropped from the schedule, focusing the eastern transcontinental service on the Ocean. CP had sold off a large portion of track the Atlantic had operated on and, as Via at that time was only mandated to provide passenger services on tracks belonging to CN or CP, the route was discontinued. This move was seen as somewhat controversial and politically motivated as the principal cities benefiting from the Atlantic's service were Sherbrooke, Quebec, and Saint John, New Brunswick, where the only two Progressive Conservative Party Members of Parliament in Canada were elected in the 1993 federal election in which Chrétien's Liberal Party took power. The Ocean service which was preserved currently operates on track between Montreal and Halifax running through the lower St. Lawrence River valley and northern New Brunswick. The Minister of Transport in Chrétien's government at the time, Douglas Young, was elected from a district that included Bathurst, New Brunswick, on the Ocean's route. A remote Via service to Quebec's Gaspé Peninsula, the Chaleur was also spared from being cut at this time, despite carrying fewer passengers than the Atlantic.

==== Renaissance funding ====
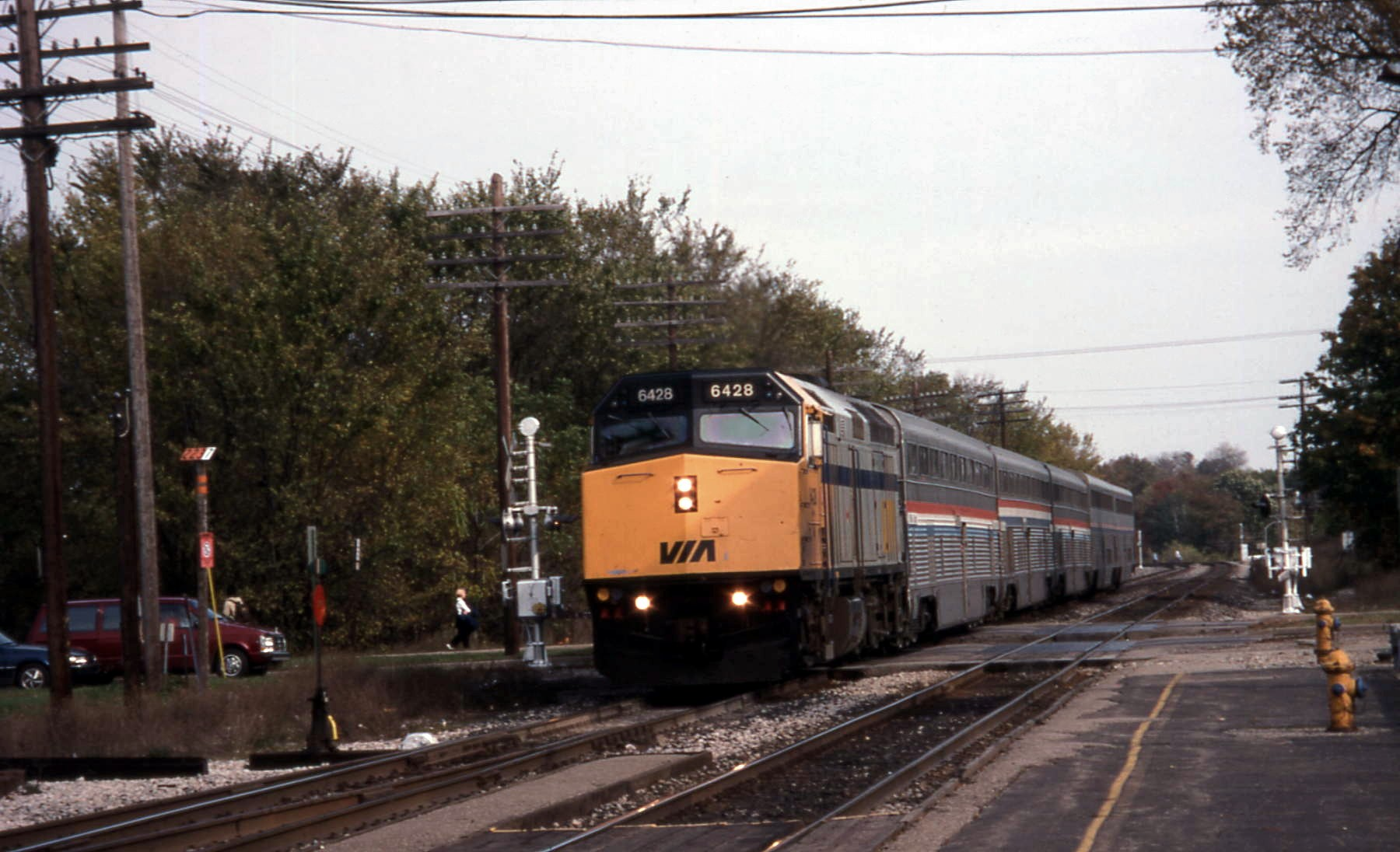
A Via locomotive leads the International with Amtrak coaches. The International route was jointly operated by Via and Amtrak from 1982 to 2004.

By the late 1990s, with a rail-friendly Minister of Transport, David Collenette, in office, there were modest funding increases to Via. Corridor services were improved with new and faster trains, a weekly tourist train, the Bras d'Or, returned Via service to Cape Breton Island for the first time since the 1990 cuts, and a commitment was made to continue operating on Vancouver Island, but western Canada continued to languish with the only service provided by the Canadian and a few remote service trains in northern BC and Manitoba.

In a significant new funding program dubbed "Renaissance", a fleet of unused passenger cars which had been built for planned Nightstar sleeper services between locations in the United Kingdom and Continental Europe via the Channel Tunnel were purchased and adapted following the cancellation of the Nightstar project. The new "Renaissance" cars were swiftly nicknamed déplaisance ("displeasure") by French-speaking employees and customers, due to early problems adapting the equipment for Canadian use. Doors and toilets froze in cold Atlantic Canada temperatures, resulting in delays and service interruptions. New diesel-electric P42DC locomotives purchased from General Electric (GE) allowed the withdrawal of older locomotives, including remaining LRCs. LRC passenger cars were retained and continued to provide much of the Corridor service. This expansion to Via's fleet has permitted scheduling flexibility. Additionally, many passenger stations have been remodelled into passenger-friendly destinations, with several hosting co-located transit and regional bus hubs for various municipalities.

=== 2000s ===
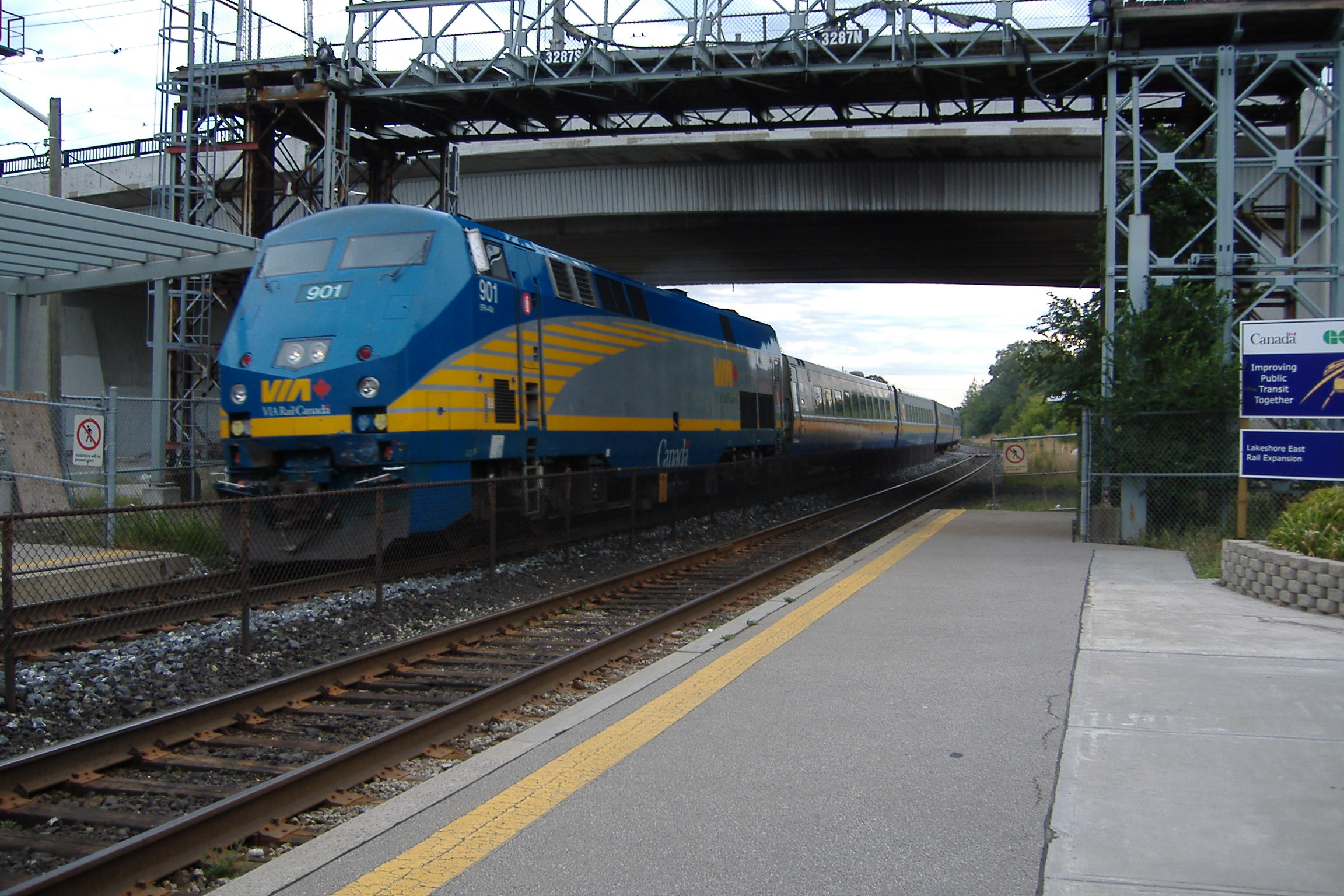
Via Rail P42DC pulling LRC coaches towards Montreal

On October 24, 2003, federal Minister of Transport David Collenette announced $700 million in new funding over the next five years. This funding was below the $3 billion needed to implement a high-speed rail proposal in the Quebec City-Windsor Corridor nicknamed ViaFast; however, the funding was intended to "provide for faster, more frequent and more reliable passenger service across Canada... [preserving] the option for higher speed rail, such as the Via Fast proposal," said Collenette. This new project was to be called "Renaissance II".

On December 18, 2003, Liberal Prime Minister (PM) Paul Martin froze federal spending on all major capital projects, including Via's five-year $700 million "Renaissance II" program announced just six weeks earlier by outgoing PM Chrétien's administration. Critics of Martin's cuts claimed that he was in a conflict of interest as his family through Canada Steamship Lines and various subsidiary and affiliated companies had once had a significant investment in the Voyageur Colonial Bus Lines, an intercity bus line in Quebec and eastern Ontario that was a key competitor of Via.

Routes cut under the Martin government included the seasonal Bras d'Or tourist train, which ran for the last time in September 2004, and the Montreal-Toronto overnight Enterprise, which was discontinued in September 2005. The Sarnia-Chicago International was also discontinued in April 2004 by Amtrak. Via's portion of the route from Toronto-Sarnia remained in operation as Via was able to use their own equipment to operate the train.

==== Sponsorship scandal ====
The federal Auditor General's report released on February 10, 2004, showed what appeared to be a criminal misdirection of government funds intended for advertising to key Quebec-based supporters of the Liberal Party of Canada. Included in the Auditor General's report was the fact that Via was used as one of several federal government departments, agencies, and Crown corporations to funnel these illicit funds. Forced to act on the Auditor General's report due to its political implications, Martin's government suspended Via President Marc LeFrançois on February 24, 2004, giving him an ultimatum of several days to defend himself against allegations in the report or face further disciplinary action.

Several days later during LeFrançois's suspension, former Via marketing department employee Myriam Bédard claimed she had been fired several years earlier when she questioned company billing practices in dealing with advertising companies. (According to CBC News, an arbitrator's report later concluded that Bédard had voluntarily left Via.) She was publicly belittled by Via CEO Jean Pelletier in national media on February 27, 2004. Pelletier retracted his statements but on March 1, Pelletier was fired. By March 5, after failing to defend himself adequately against the allegations in the Auditor General's report, LeFrançois was fired as well.

==== Increasing problems and reinstated funding ====
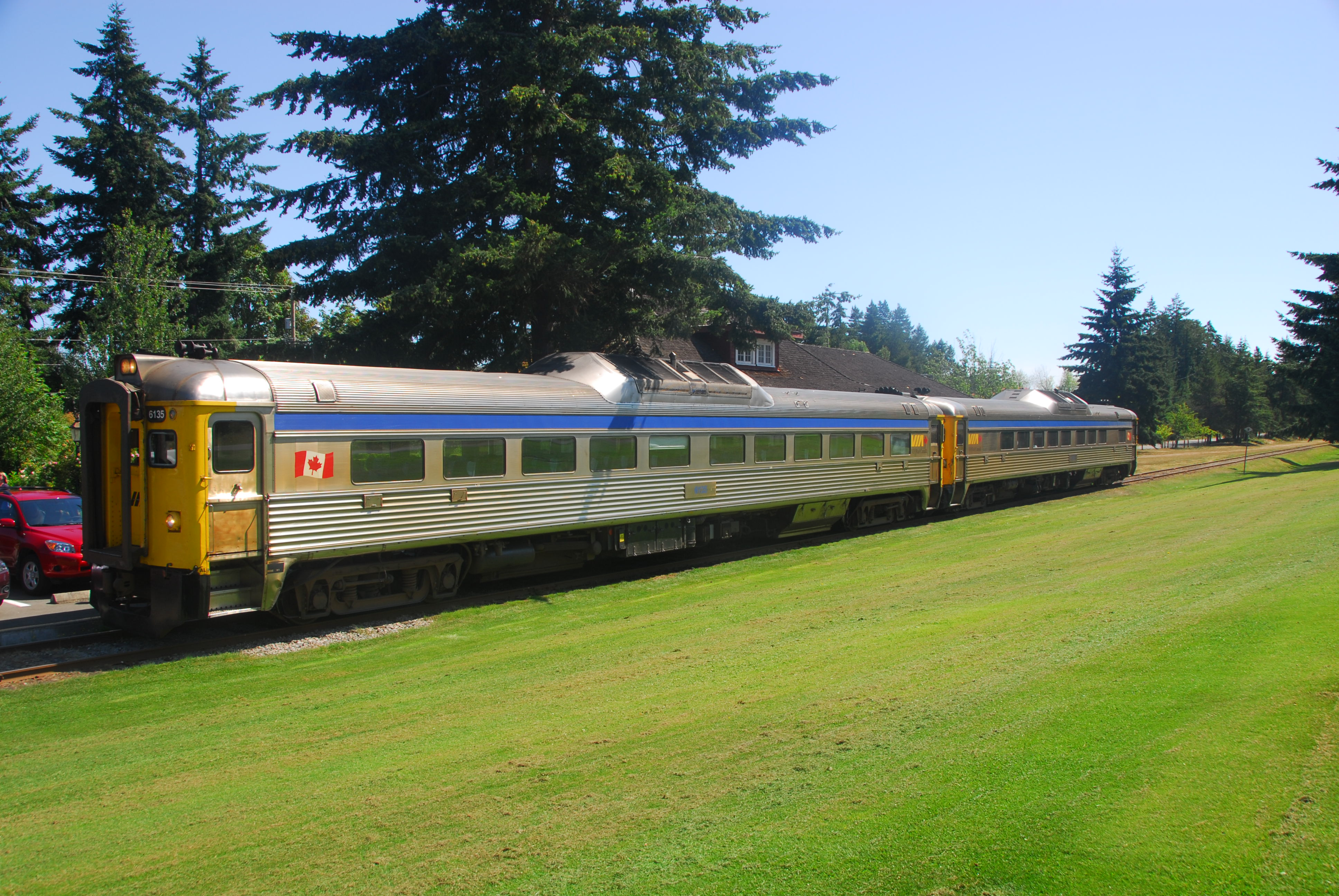
Via RDCs at Qualicum Beach station, a stop on Victoria–Courtenay train. The Victoria–Courtenay service was suspended in March 2010.

The reversal of funding in 2003 led to a backlog of deferred maintenance and left Via unable to replace or refurbish life-expired locomotives and rolling stock. Conversely, Via ridership increased from 3.8 million in 2005 to 4.1 million in 2006. On October 11, 2007, Finance Minister Jim Flaherty announced federal government funding of $691.9 million over five years (of which $519 million was for capital projects and the remainder additional operating funding). The capital funding was earmarked to refurbish Via's fleet of 54 F40PH-2 locomotives to meet new emissions standards and extend their service lives by 15–20 years, refurbish the interiors of LRC coaches, reduce track capacity bottlenecks and speed restrictions in the Windsor-Quebec City Corridor, and make repairs to a number of stations across the network.

This announcement was similar in content to the previous "Renaissance II" package, and once again was criticized for not including new equipment or funding for services outside the Windsor-Quebec City Corridor. Shortly afterwards, documents obtained by the Canadian Press under the Access to Information Act revealed that delays due to equipment failures had risen by 60 percent since the previous year. The company attributed this to problems with the aging F40 locomotive fleet.

On January 27, 2009, the Government of Canada's 2009 Economic Action Plan increased funding to Via by $407 million to support improvements, including increased train frequencies and enhanced on-time performance and speed, particularly in the Montreal-Ottawa-Toronto corridor.

On July 21, 2009, Via began cancelling all trains in anticipation of an engineers' strike, which officially began at midnight on July 24. Engineers had been without a contract since December 31, 2006. Full service resumed on July 27. An additional strike by the Canadian Auto Workers (CAW) union, representing around 2,200 employees, was planned to begin on July 4, 2010, but was called off after the union and Via reached a three-year contract.

=== 2010s ===
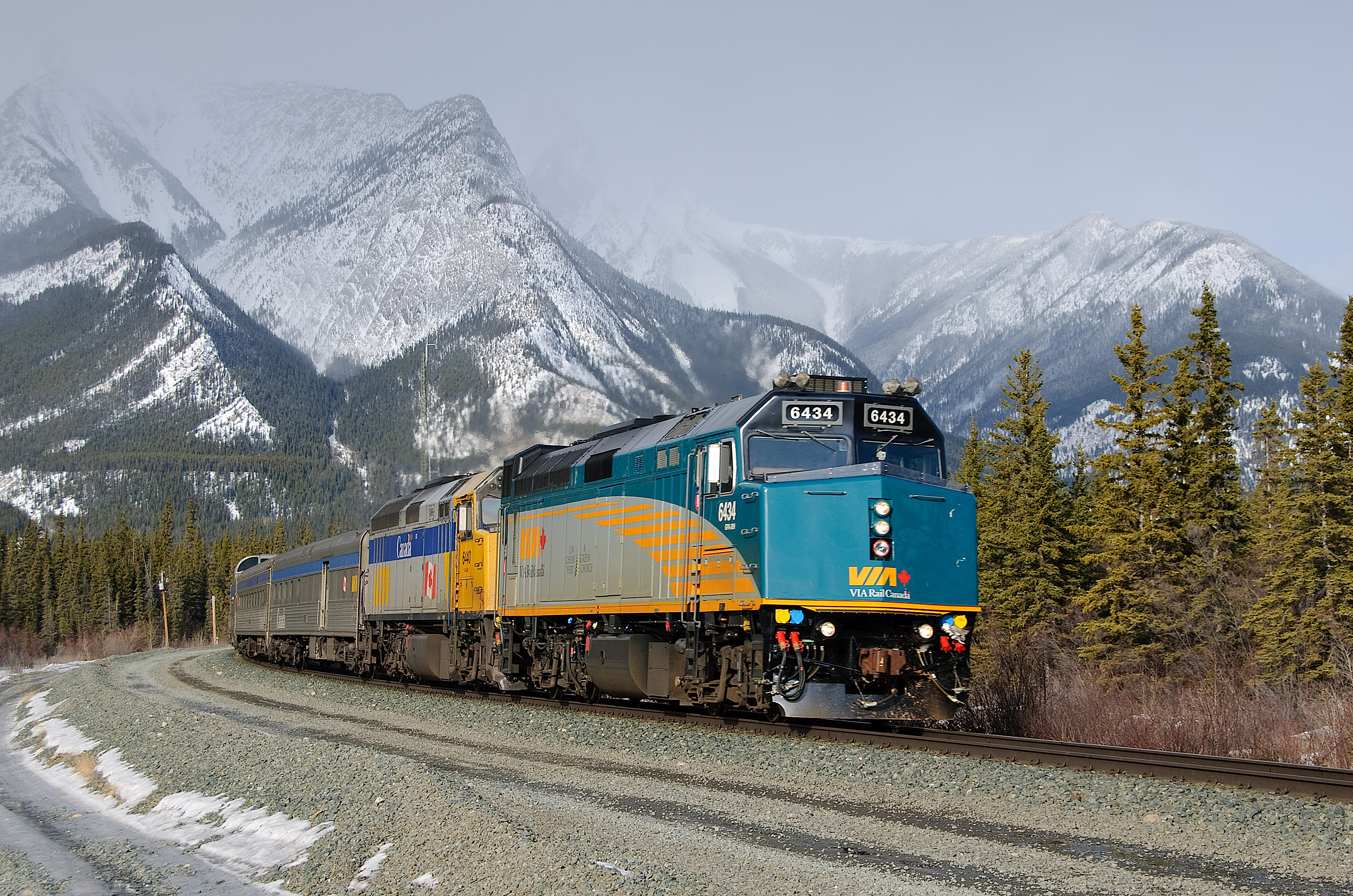
A Via F40PH-2D in Jasper, February 2011. Via's fleet of F40PH-2Ds were refurbished in the late-2000s to meet emission standards.

Via experienced more service cuts at the dawn of the 2010s. In March 2011, the daily Victoria–Courtenay The Malahat RDC service on Vancouver Island was suspended indefinitely due to deteriorating track (it has yet to resume). By June 27, 2012, Via announced additional service cuts due to funding issues:

- The Canadian was reduced from three days a week to two days a week beginning November 2012; service operated twice weekly November–April and thrice weekly May–October until 2019. In 2019, only two trains per week operated on the full route, while the third train ran only between Vancouver and Edmonton once a week in each direction.
- The Ocean was reduced from six days a week to thrice weekly beginning October 2012.
- Corridor services west of Toronto were reduced, with weekend service reductions to Montreal and Ottawa, Ontario.
- Corridor services to Sarnia and the Niagara region were reduced to once daily in October 2012, with additional taking effect in July 2012. Sarnia was left with a single daily round-trip. Niagara Falls lost all service except the joint Amtrak-Via daily New York City-Toronto Maple Leaf service, although Toronto regional commuter service was later provided by GO Transit.
- Corridor services to Kitchener, London, and Windsor were reduced starting in October 2012, with at least two daily round trips surviving.
- In September 2013, the Gaspé service, which had been "bustituted" in 2011, was suspended indefinitely.

To address declining on-time performance due to freight train traffic on Via routes, MP Olivia Chow drafted a private member's bill in 2014 that would reorganize the company and allow the government to force freight rail carriers to give scheduling priority to public passenger rail. However, as with most private member's bills, it was not passed.

==== Service improvements ====
The Quebec-Windsor corridor was the focus of service restorations and implements. A direct Ottawa-Quebec City train was restored, with additional trips between Ottawa, Montreal and Toronto being added. In 2016, LRC passenger cars used for the corridor were refurbished; in the Via 1 class, this included single seating.

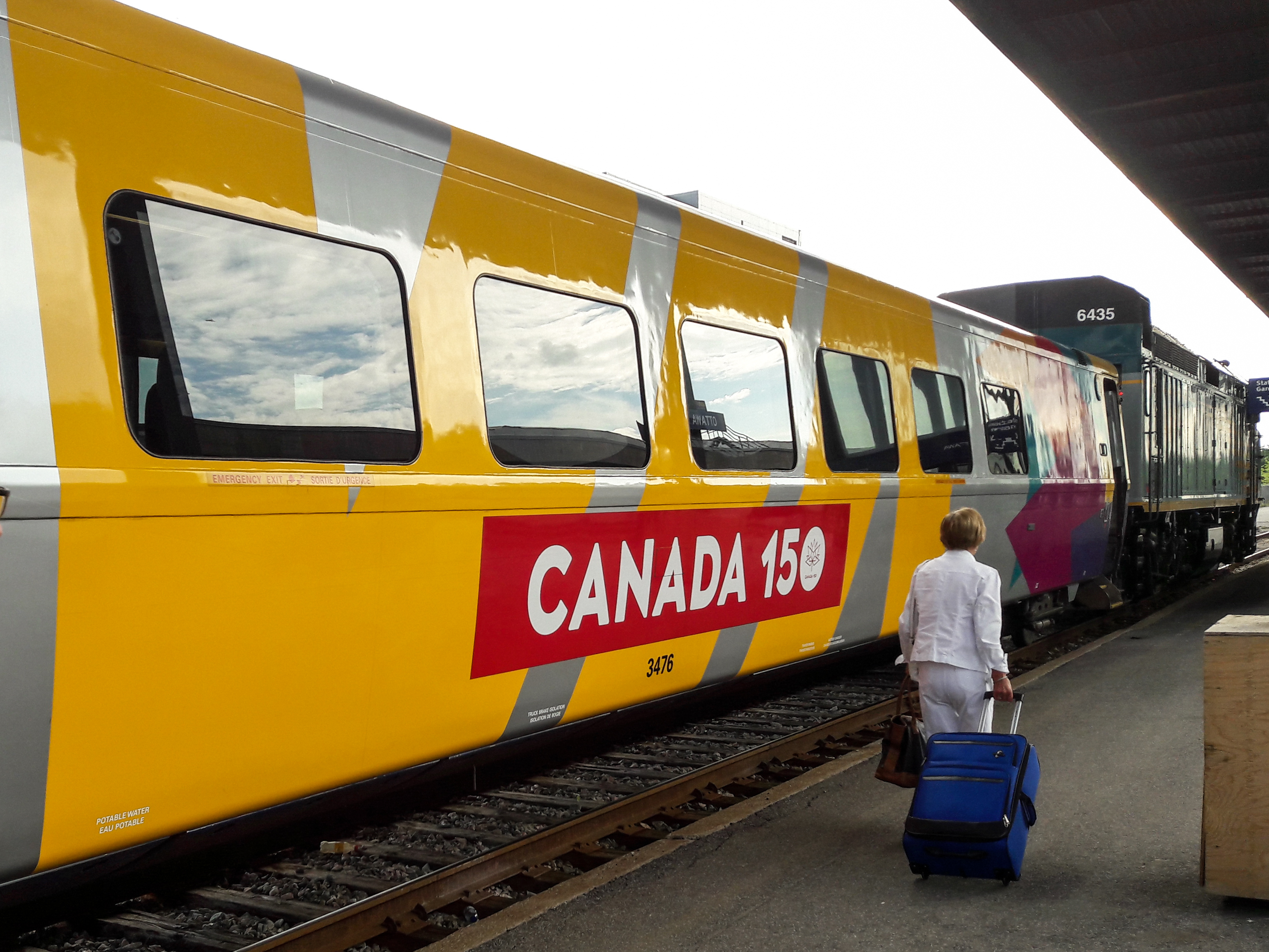
A passenger car adorned in Canada 150 livery, August 2017. For the country's sesquicentennial, Via released a special youth rail pass.

In March 2017, Via announced the release of a new category of rail pass valid for the month of July 2017 (corresponding to Canada's sesquicentennial celebrations) for youth aged 18–25, costing $150 (several hundred dollars cheaper than a comparable rail pass would typically cost). A larger than expected response resulted in the temporary loss of functionality for Via's website. Despite plans to cap the number of passes sold at 1867 (the year of Canadian Confederation), over 4,000 passes were ultimately sold. The company received significant backlash, as it initially appeared there was no limit on the number of passes available.

Extreme winter conditions had always been an operational hazard for Via, with the Ottawa routes and Canadian being most vulnerable. Equally, summer repairs and construction often delayed trains systemwide, even though schedules were regularly adjusted in an attempt to minimize delays.

However, by 2018, freight traffic on the heavily used CN lines had become a significant concern for maintaining on-time service. This issue arose due to typical siding sizes, which were not long enough to accommodate modern freight trains. Passenger trains were consequently placed on sidings whenever two trains passed (rather than freights), which meant that passenger trains did not have priority on CN lines. The issue existed in all parts of the Via network, although it became most extreme on the Canadian, where delays increased from an average of five hours to as much as 50 over the four-day journey. Via ultimately addressed the issue by eliminating its late policy on its cross-Canada trains but retaining it for the Corridor routes. However, Via continues to compensate inconvenienced guests with necessary hotel accommodations prior to the journey, as well as ensuring continued transportation where a connection to a second Via train had been missed. As such, compensation costs were factored into Via's 2018 budget.

By the end of 2018, the full route time on the Canadian had been increased twice to absorb freight delays. The second extension – to five days – has been mostly successful in decreasing delays, and also allowed for a daytime transit of Hells Gate in BC, previously transversed overnight in the dark. The scheduled increased running time actually resulted in the Canadian arriving early on several occasions. However, Toronto–Vancouver service frequencies were reduced to only twice weekly during peak summer period, with a third Toronto–Edmonton run suspended entirely. [clear]

On December 12, 2018, Via announced that it had awarded a contract to Siemens Canada for 32 train sets to replace the entire Quebec City-Windsor Corridor fleet. This marked the completion of a procurement process launched following the 2018 federal budget, which allocated funding for the fleet replacement. During the request-for-proposals stage, Via had narrowed the potential suppliers down to Siemens, Bombardier, Talgo and Stadler Rail. Siemens was ultimately selected after finishing first on the key criteria, which included the ability to deliver in a timely fashion, the quality of the product offering, and the price. The new fleet consists of Siemens SC-42 locomotives hauling a combination of coaches, business-class cars, and cab cars from the Siemens Venture series to allow bi-directional operation. The trains were built at Siemens' plant in Sacramento, California, and Siemens committed to including at least 20 percent Canadian content in the final product. The order includes an option for an additional 16 train sets to be exercised if the federal government approves Via's high-frequency dedicated-corridor project. The first train set began testing in December 2021, with the first sets in service by 2022 and all trains in service by 2024. The delivery of the new trains will allow Via to retire LRC and Renaissance equipment from the corridor, and re-allocate the HEP2 and corridor-based HEP1 cars to other parts of the network.

=== 2020s ===
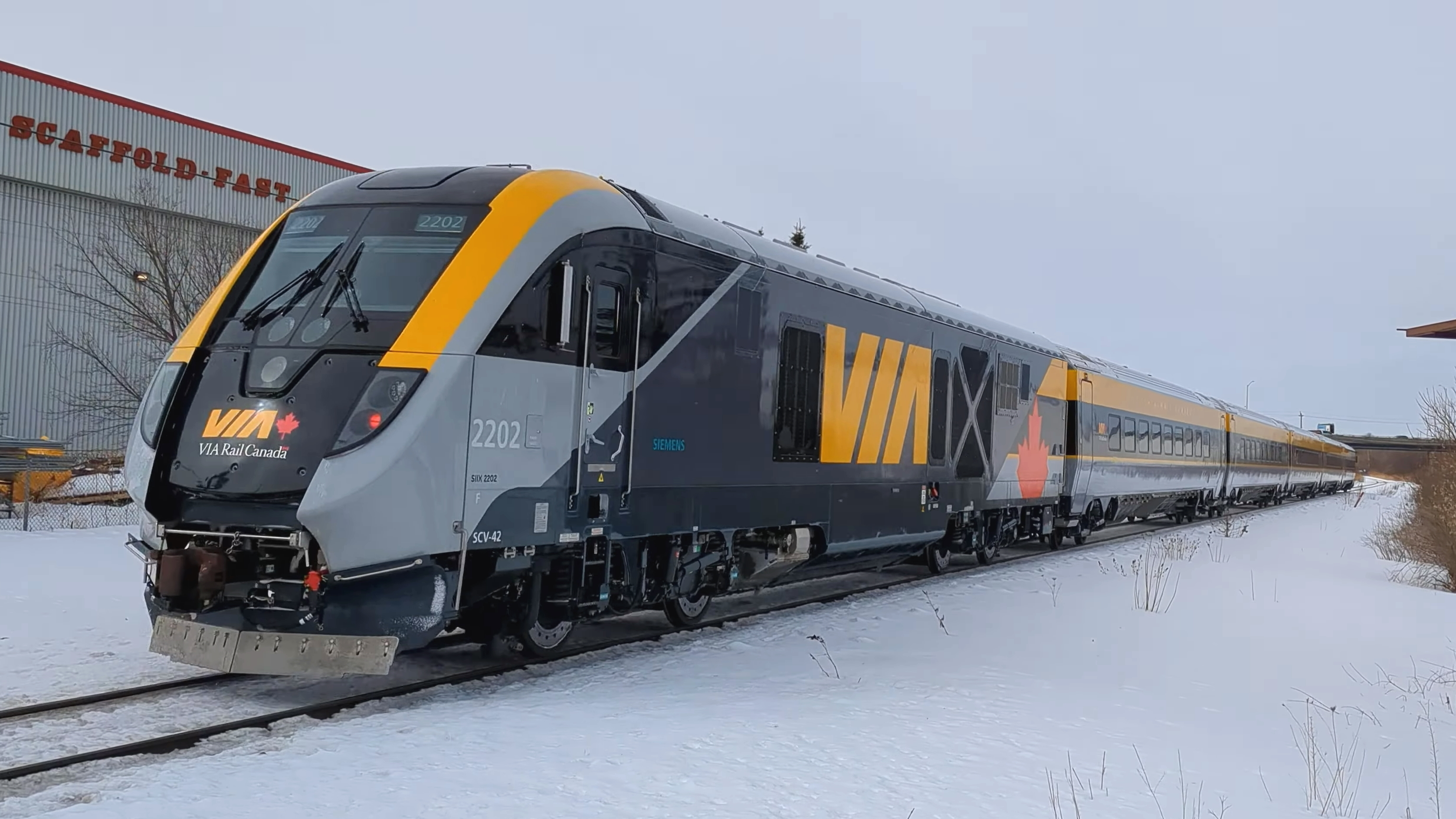
A Via Rail SCV-42 Charger pushing Siemens Venture trainsets in 2023

On October 30, 2021, Via Rail implemented a mandatory COVID-19 vaccine policy in line with new Transport Canada regulations in response to the COVID-19 pandemic, which required all Via Rail staff and passengers aged 12 and older to be fully vaccinated against COVID-19 to travel aboard Via Rail trains. Until November 30 a negative COVID test was also considered an alternate to show proof of vaccine prior to boarding.

On March 9, 2022, Minister of Transport Omar Alghabra announced that the federal government would seek private proposals for operation of the proposed High Frequency Rail corridor. Labour union Unifor criticized this move, calling it a first step toward eventual privatization of Via Rail, and launched the Get Canada Back on Track campaign to raise awareness and call for "a legislative framework that protects public, accessible, safe passenger rail and directs immediate public investments" to service improvements.

Via Rail submitted a request for proposals for its long-distance railcar fleet in fall 2024, and an RFP for long-distance locomotives in early 2025. In July 2026, Stadler Rail was awarded a contract to build 45 locomotives in a new Stadler plant to be built in Montreal. In August 2026, Prime Minister Mark Carney announced a $4.7 billion investment for 313 new long distance passenger rail cars, constructed in Canada by Alstom based on their Adessia platform.

== Insignia ==
In addition to using commercial logos, Via Rail is one of several Crown corporations that has been granted heraldic symbols by the Canadian Heraldic Authority.

The coat of arms was granted on May 15, 2020, and presented by Canada's Chief Herald.

An heraldic badge was approved for use at the same time as the coat of arms. The badge design follows the design of a law enforcement agency badge in Canada, denoting the responsibilities of Via Rail Police Service. The Royal Crown indicates that Via Rail has police constables appointed for the enforcement of the laws relating to the protection of persons and property.

A flag was also granted by the Canadian Heraldic Authority. It is black and charged with Via Rail's badge.

== Budget and management ==
Via is operated as an independent crown corporation and receives a subsidy from the Minister of Transport to provide service to remote communities. Via operates more than 500 trains per week from coast to coast. The sum of CA$369 million was earned from passenger revenues in 2018. Over 4.74 million passenger voyages were taken in 2018. An on-time ratio of 71 percent was achieved in that year. Over 3,115 persons were employed by Via by the end of 2018.

Via president Yves Desjardins-Siciliano stated that the subsidy for passenger rail travel in Canada in 2015 was about 200 percent: for every $1 travellers spend on fares, Canada pays $2 in subsidy.

As of May 2019, the chair of the board of directors is Françoise Bertrand. The Annual accounts of Via are audited to GAAP principles by the Auditor-General of Canada, under the Financial Administration Act. As a federal Crown corporation, Via Rail Canada Inc. operates under the Canada Business Corporations Act and is subject to income taxes, should a profit ever be declared by it. The corporation had $9,300,000 in share capital as of 2018. Via also received $394.4 million of government funding in 2018.

=== Expansion plans ===
==== Maritimes ====
Via has explored the introduction of daily regional service in Nova Scotia and New Brunswick (connecting Halifax, Moncton, and Campbellton) to complement the thrice-weekly Ocean service to Montreal. As of 2017, Via's statement was that it was "exploring an eastern intercity corridor service" and that further developments were dependent on infrastructure upgrades and equipment testing.

Via has also expressed interest in operating commuter rail service on CN tracks in Halifax that would run from the city's downtown station as far as Windsor Junction. However, in June 2019, Halifax regional council voted unanimously to direct staff "not to pursue commuter rail service further ... due to infrastructure requirements and associated financial implications, as well as operational considerations and restraints".

==== High-frequency rail project ====
Via developed a $4.4 billion high-frequency rail (HFR) service plan as a response to delays faced by sharing tracks with freight trains. The plan opts for a dedicated track between Toronto, Ottawa, Montreal, and Quebec City, offering more frequent trains (although running at conventional speeds). In Ontario, Via would run a new rail line on currently underused tracks from Toronto to Ottawa through Peterborough instead of Kingston. In Quebec, corridor trains would travel from Montreal to Quebec City through Trois-Rivières on the north shore of the St. Lawrence River rather than on the south shore through Drummondville. Via claimed this would allow them to run more trains in the corridor, reduce trip times by 25 percent and improve on-time performance to over 95 percent.

Feasibility studies were funded by the federal government in the 2016–2018 budgets, and the 2018 budget allowed for the funding of the fleet replacement portion of the plan, though not the dedicated rail lines. Contrary to expectations, the 2019 federal budget did not include a final decision for new funds for HFR. However, in January 2020 Via announced the hiring of a joint venture of engineering firms AECOM and Arup to undertake a detailed engineering study of the proposal. The Toronto city council passed a motion supporting the project on March 30, 2023.

In February 2025, the federal government announced that the Via HFR project had now become Alto, a high-speed rail network in the Toronto - Quebec City corridor.

=== Service suspensions ===
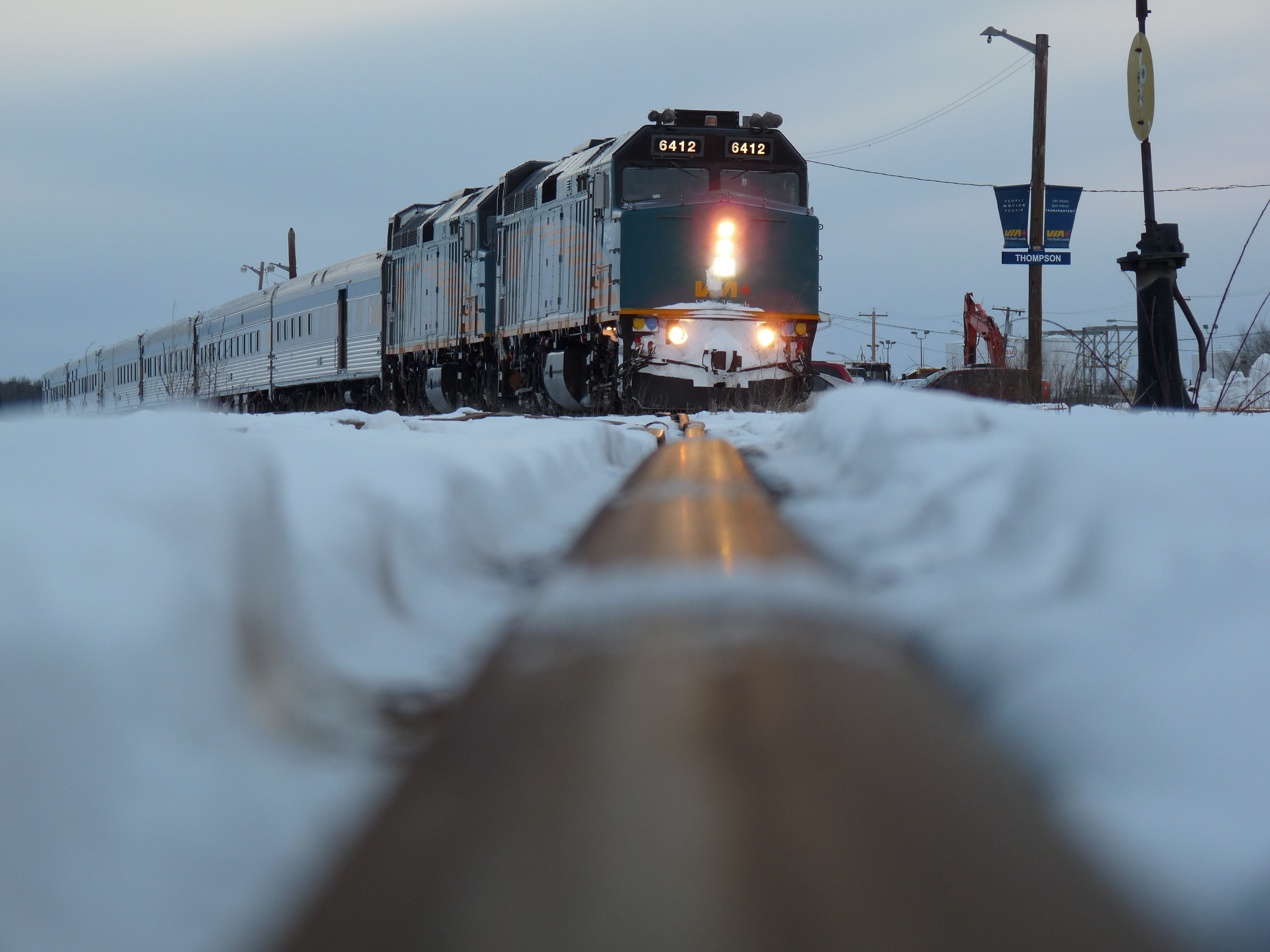
A Via F40PH-2D leading the Winnipeg–Churchill train, November 2012. The service was suspended from May 2017 to December 2018 for track maintenance.

Two former Via routes—The Malahat (service ended in 2011) and Chaleur (service ended in 2013)—are currently suspended due to poor track conditions. Via plans to reintroduce service once track upgrades have been completed. The Quebec government announced funds for repairs to Chaleur trackage in 2017, with a completion date stated only as being "several years away." No concrete plan to restore trackage along The Malahat has been announced as of 2020.

The Winnipeg–Churchill train was disrupted by severe spring flooding on May 23, 2017, when the Hudson Bay Railway tracks were damaged beyond standard maintenance. Winnipeg–Gillam service continued. OmniTRAX, the original owner of the track, refused to make the repairs, saying that the track was no longer viable, despite the matching federal subsidy. The railroad was Churchill's only land link to southern Canada, and its loss resulted in significant cost-of-living increases for residents along the corridor (a stranded train was removed by ship in October 2017).

Service to Churchill was restored in late 2018, after the tracks, Churchill port, and Churchill marine tank farm were purchased by Arctic Gateway Group. The federal government assisted in the purchase with $74 million of dedicated northern infrastructure money up front and an additional commitment of $43 million over 10 years. To restore passenger rail service before winter, Arctic Gateway repaired 29 washouts in 35 days. Although a special Via train arrived in Churchill on November 1, the first regular Via train arrived in Churchill on December 4, 560 days after service initially ceased.

VIA rail train car at The Forks headed North to Churchill

On February 13, 2020, following several days of blockades during the nationwide Coastal GasLink Pipeline protests, Via Rail announced that it would be shutting down most of its passenger train service across Canada until further notice, with the exception of the Sudbury–White River train line and the Winnipeg–Churchill train between Churchill and The Pas. Later in 2020, in response to the COVID-19 pandemic, nearly all Via Rail trains were suspended with the exception of the Winnipeg-Churchill train as well as one train daily on each route within the corridor. Along with the previous protest-related service suspensions, it is the most extensive temporary reduction of service in Via Rail's history.

== Travelling on Via ==
Travel on Via varies by region as much as class. Many of Via's policies and protocols are the product of running a national train system with varying pressures and needs of different passengers, communities, and contexts. The results are wide-ranging travel experiences depending on the distance and location of the journey.

=== Unscheduled stops ===
Some Via routes outside the corridor offer the option of unscheduled stops at places where there is no station. With 48 hours notice, a passenger can request to entrain or detrain at a specified milepost. This option is available on all of the Adventure Routes, as well as the Canadian between Capreol and Winnipeg.

=== Classes of service ===
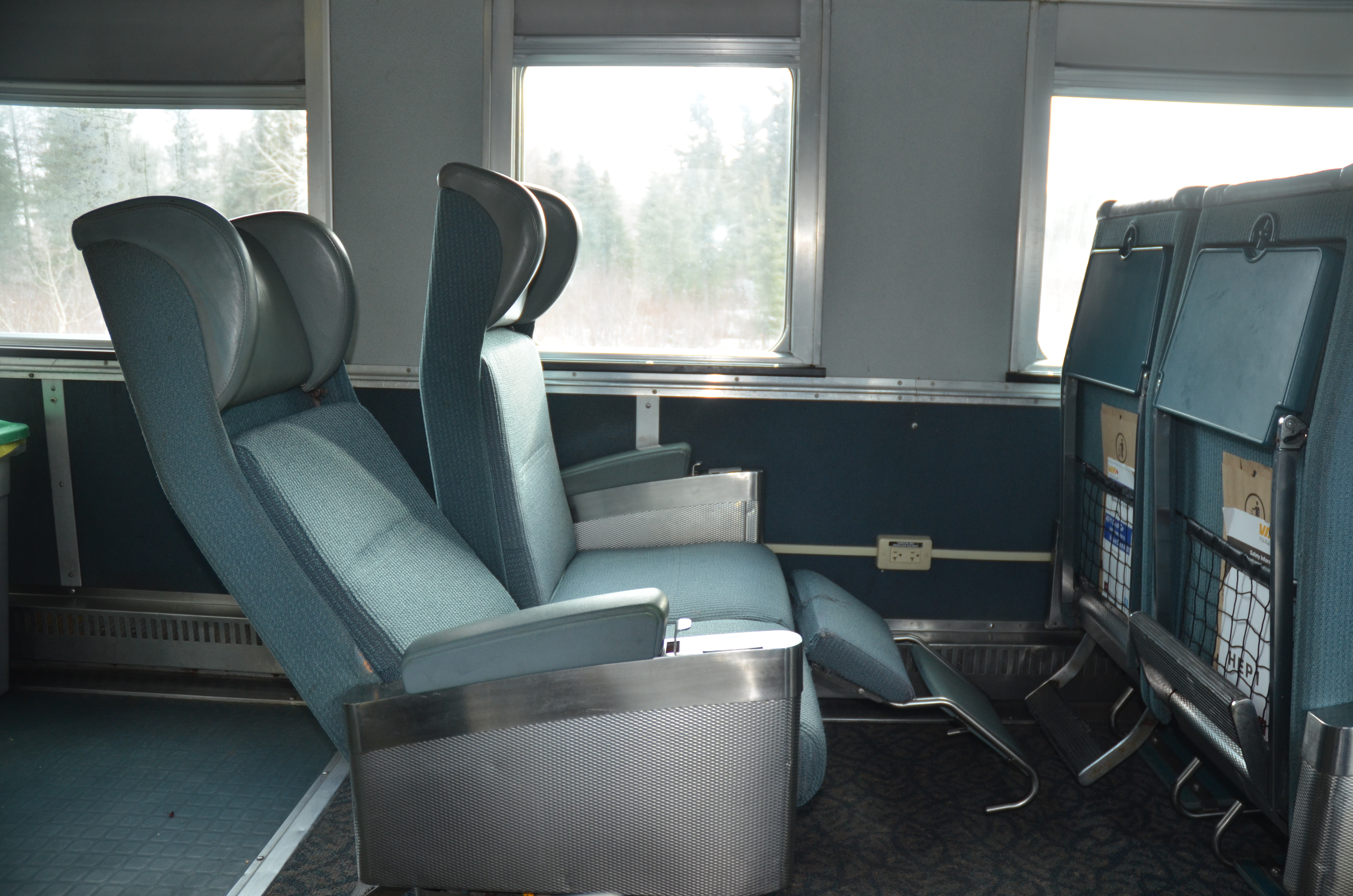
Economy-class seating in a Via Rail long-distance coach car, with one fully reclined

- Economy: Economy class seating in coach cars. Snacks and beverages are sold by employees with service carts, in a lounge car, or in a restaurant car. Free Wi-Fi access is provided in the Corridor and on the Ocean. The online-only Escape fare disallows modifications and reservations but are at a cheaper price; Economy Plus is a fully refundable ticket.

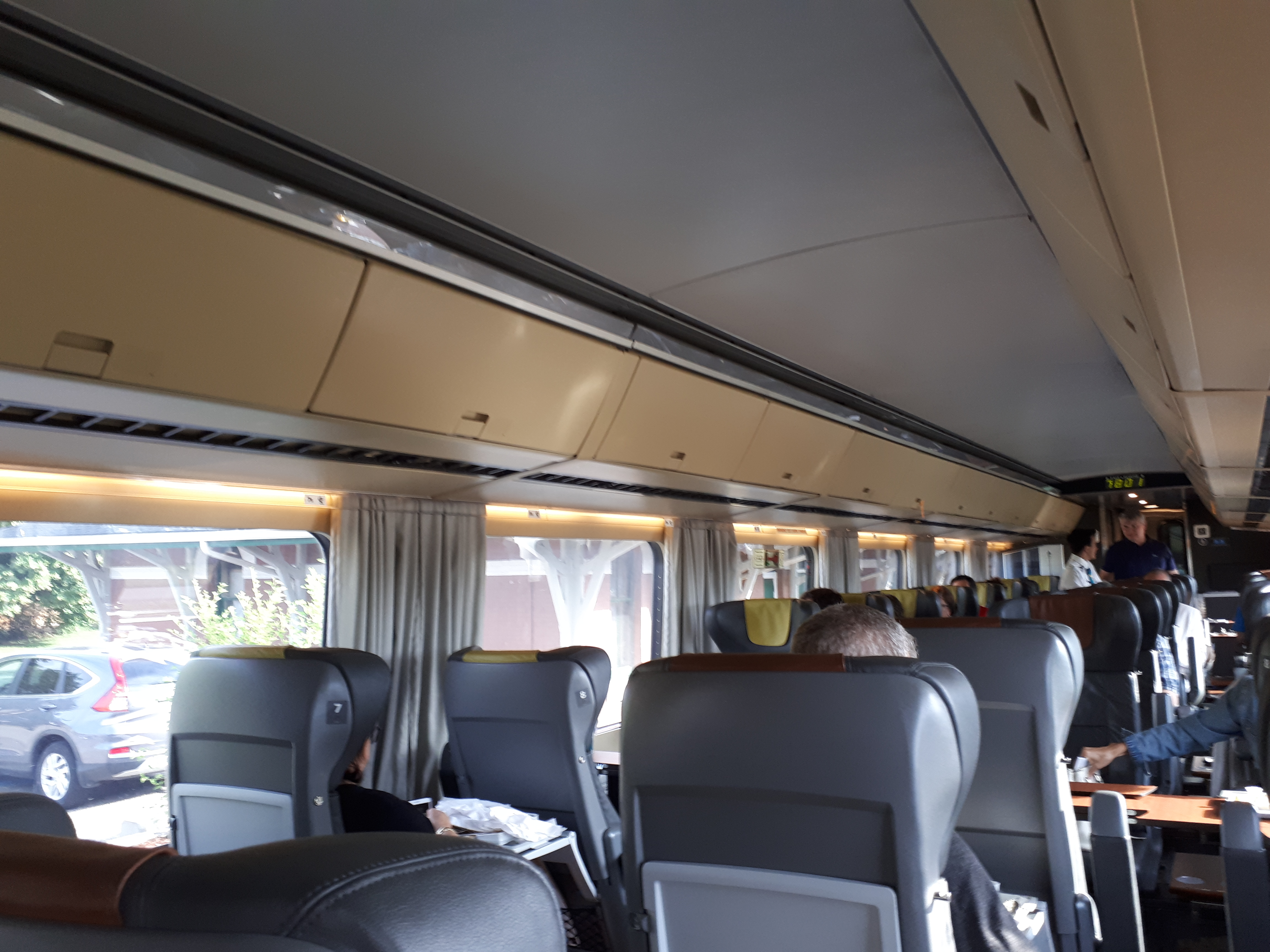
Business-class coach on the Corridor

- Business: (formerly called Via 1): First-class seating available on most Corridor trains in southern Quebec and Ontario.
- Touring: Available on the Skeena only in peak travel months.
- Sleeper Plus: Sleeping accommodations aboard overnight trains. This service class was formerly known as Sleeper in some cases, including on the now-suspended Chaleur. Each car has access to a washroom and, optionally, a shower. Access to business lounges where available or the Sleeper Plus Lounge in Halifax is available on departure day.
- Prestige: Available on the Canadian only. In addition to the Sleeper Plus amenities, includes modernized luxurious sleeping accommodations at the rear of the train.

=== On board ===
==== Amenities ====
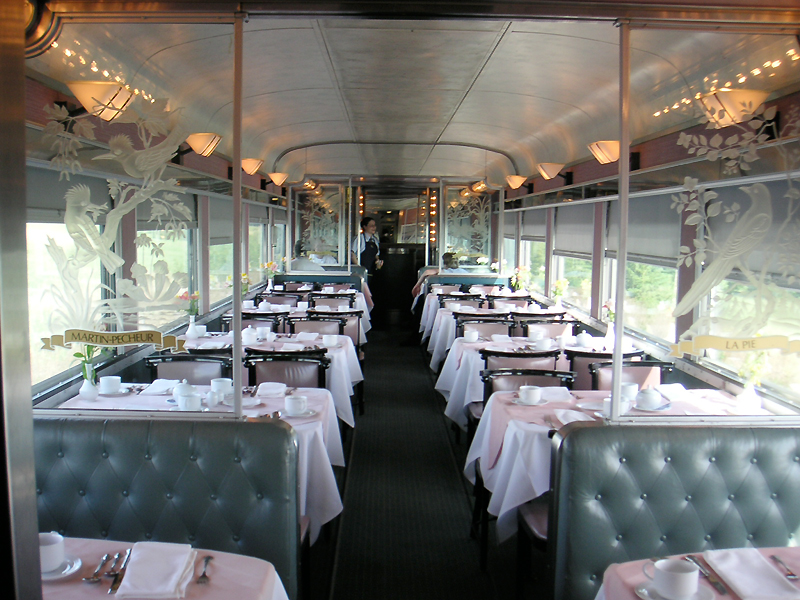
A Via dining car preparing for the first serving of breakfast

Smoking is prohibited on all Via trains. Smoking tobacco has been banned on the Corridor routes since 1993 and this policy was gradually extended to all trains, while smoking cannabis was banned on all Via routes on the same day it was made legal in Canada. The last remaining on-board smoking was permitted in a smoker's lounge on some long-distance routes, only at certain times of day until 2002.

Washrooms are provided for each car. On sleeper cars, every private room has its own separate washroom.

Food service varies by train. All trains besides the Sudbury–White River train offer snacks, light meals, and both alcoholic and non-alcoholic beverages for purchase. Long-distance trains offer traditional sit-down dining and full meals to sleeper class passengers. Economy-class passengers can purchase hot take-out meals prepared in the dining car on long-distance trains during the peak season, and eat in the sit-down dining car in the off-peak.

Complimentary Wi-Fi service is available in the Corridor. Via was the first North American transportation service to offer Wi-Fi to its passengers in early 2006, and was one of the first in the world to do so.

Wi-Fi service has been added to the Ocean train in the service cars, although connections are unreliable in most places outside urban centres.

==== Accessibility and safety concerns ====
All Via trains are capable of accommodating wheelchairs, although capacity is limited.

== Routes and connections ==
A map of Via Rail routes, showing the frequency of Via trains on it

Via operates in the provinces of Alberta, British Columbia, Manitoba, New Brunswick, Nova Scotia, Ontario, Quebec, and Saskatchewan. The only province or territory connected to the continental railway network and not served by Via is the Northwest Territories. Newfoundland and Labrador, Nunavut, Prince Edward Island, and Yukon have no rail connections to the continental network and thus no Via service.

Via operates over 475 trains per week over 19 routes, marketed in four broad categories:

- Ontario and Quebec/Corridor service: comprising frequent regional and local trains between major cities in a band from Southwestern Ontario to Quebec City. The vast majority of Via's trains – over 400 per week – operate here. Cities served by Corridor trains include Windsor, Sarnia, London, Toronto, Kingston, Ottawa, Montreal, and Quebec City. In 2017, corridor service accounted for 95 percent of Via's ridership and 77 percent of its revenue.
- The Maritime Way/Ocean: providing long-distance service between Quebec and the Maritime provinces. In 2017, the Ocean accounted for 2 percent of Via's ridership and 3 percent of its revenue.
- The Great Western Way/Canadian: providing both long-distance service between Southern Ontario and Western Canada, as well as essential rail services through Northern Ontario. In 2017, the Canadian accounted for 2 percent of Via's ridership and 20 percent of its revenue.
- Adventure Routes: Five regional and long-distance routes that offer essential rail transportation in rural northern areas. In 2017, these routes in aggregate accounted for 1 percent of Via's ridership and revenue. The routes included in this category are:
  - Jasper–Prince Rupert train (former name: Skeena) - Alberta and British Columbia
  - Montreal–Jonquière train (former name: Saguenay) - Quebec
  - Montreal–Senneterre train (former name: Abitibi) - Quebec
  - Sudbury–White River train (former name: Lake Superior) - Ontario
  - Winnipeg–Churchill train (former name: Hudson Bay) - Manitoba and Saskatchewan

Unlike Amtrak, which gives every route a specific name, most Via trains are identified only by their route number and destination. The only named Via trains are the Canadian and the Ocean. The five "Adventure Routes" were previously branded as the Skeena, the Saguenay, the Abitibi, the Lake Superior, and the Hudson Bay, respectively, and may still be referred to by these names in local usage.

=== Track ownership ===
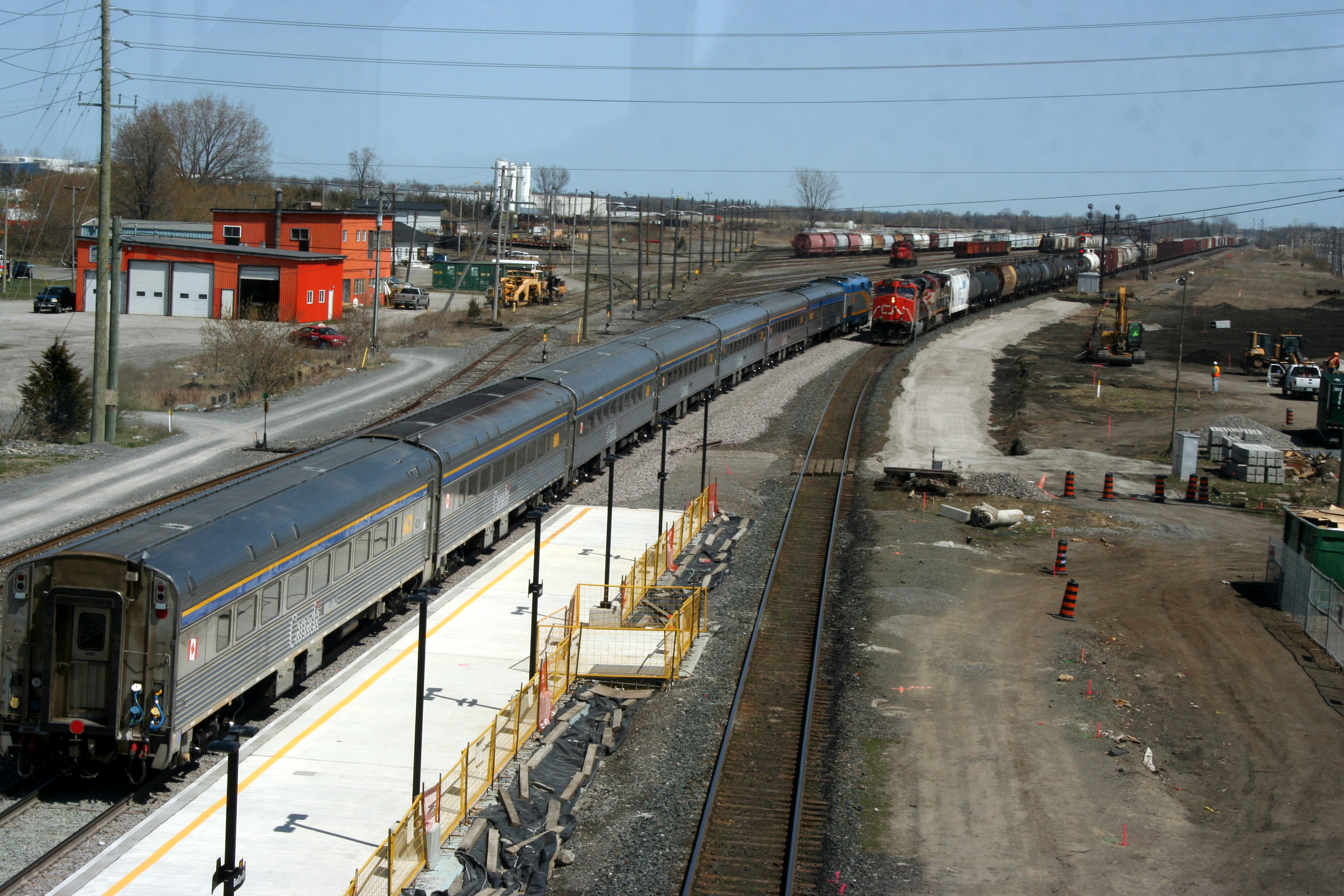
A Via Rail train passes by a Canadian National Railway train at Belleville. The majority of the track Via operates on is owned by CNR.

As of 2017, the mileage makeup of Via's route network by track owner/host railway was as follows: (Note: Since the most recent corporate plan was published, the Guelph Subdivision, used by Via between Kitchener and London, has reverted to CN from the Goderich-Exeter Railway.)

- 84 per cent: Canadian National Railway
- 8 per cent: Hudson Bay Railway
- 4 per cent: Canadian Pacific Railway
- 3 per cent: Via Rail
- 2 per cent: Metrolinx (GO Transit)

In total, about 88 percent of Via trackage is owned by Class I railroads, 8 percent by shortline railroads, and 5 percent by government agencies.

=== Connections ===
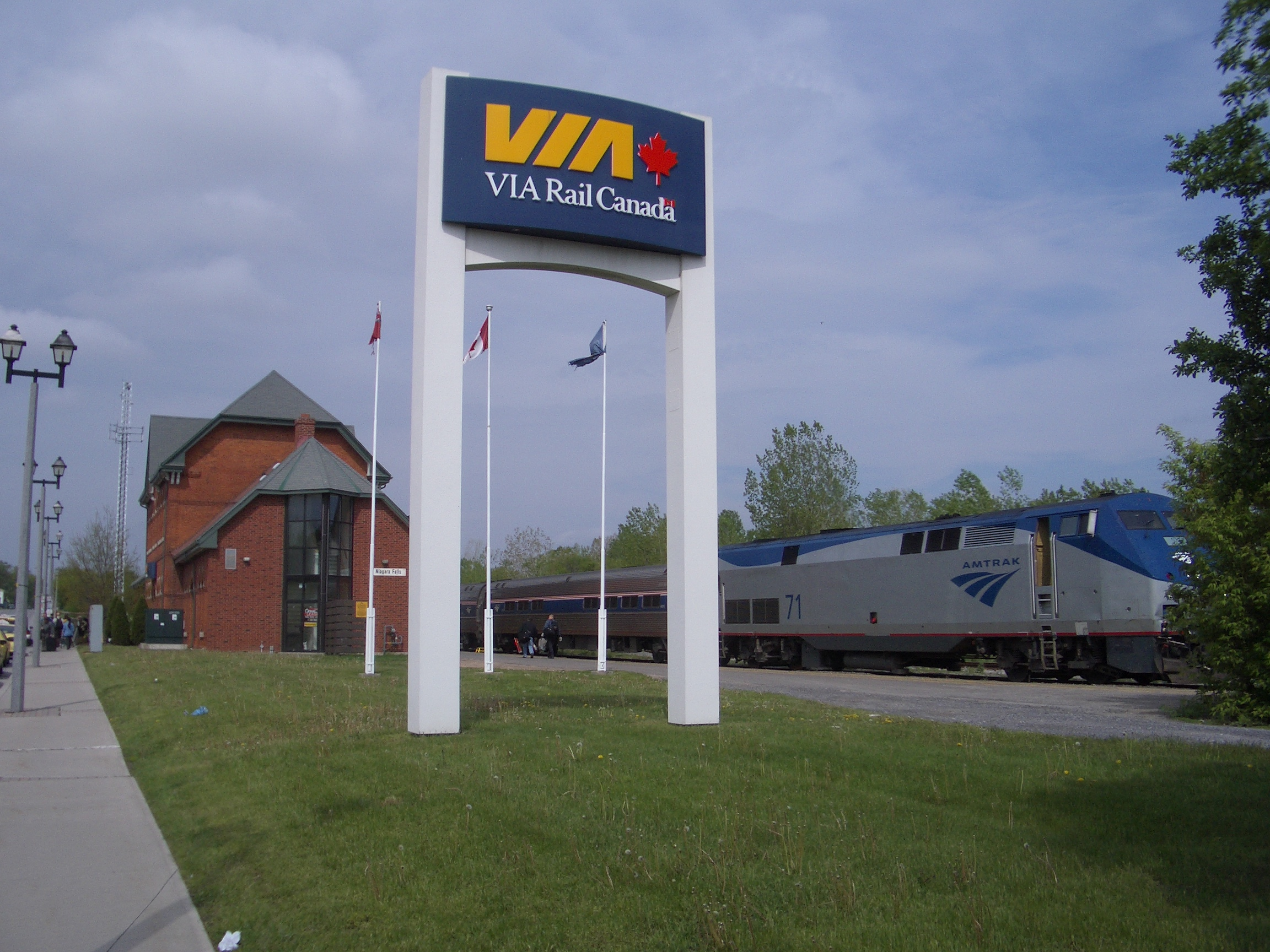
The Maple Leaf train outside Niagara Falls station. The route is jointly operated between Via and Amtrak, providing Via riders with a connection to Amtrak stations based in New York.

The Maple Leaf, operating between New York City and Toronto via Albany, Buffalo, and Niagara Falls, is jointly managed by Via and Amtrak. The train operates using Amtrak equipment, but on the Canadian side of the border is staffed by Via employees and operated as a typical Via train.

Two other train routes link Canada and the US: the Adirondack (Montreal–New York) and the Amtrak Cascades (Vancouver–Seattle–Portland). While both of these routes share stations with Via at their Canadian termini, they are fully operated by Amtrak and single-ticket connections to Via trains are not offered.

Via also has connection agreements with several local and intercity bus operators, car-sharing services, and airlines. Passengers who are flying with some airlines can combine their air and rail trips under the same record locator.

== Rolling stock ==
Via owns 74 locomotives and 501 passenger cars. Examples include the GMD F40PH-2 diesel locomotive, the Siemens Charger and the famed "Park"-class sleeper-dome-lounge cars found on the rear of the Canadian and the Jasper–Prince Rupert train.

== Accidents and incidents ==
- On February 8, 1986, a Via train collided with a CN freight train near Hinton, Alberta, killing 23 people and injuring 71.
- On November 20, 1994, at approximately 18:20, Via train No. 66 travelling eastward at approximately 96 mph, struck a piece of rail intentionally placed on the track at Mile 242.07 of the CN North America Kingston Subdivision, in Brighton, Ontario. A fire erupted and the trailing portion of the locomotive and the first two-passenger cars behind the locomotive became engulfed in flames. Forty-six of the 385 passengers were injured, most while exiting the train in life-threatening conditions. 2 local residents were charged and convicted after an investigation by the local police.
- On September 3, 1997, the Canadian (train No. 2) from Vancouver to Toronto, travelling eastward at 67 mph, derailed at Mile 7.5 of the CN Wainwright Subdivision, near Biggar, Saskatchewan. Thirteen of nineteen cars and the two locomotives derailed. Seventy-nine of the 198 passengers and crew on board were injured, 1 fatally and 13 seriously. Approximately 600 feet of main track was destroyed. The cause was determined to be an axle bearing failure which was detected but erroneously ignored. Via was heavily criticized for a lack of attention to safety.
- On April 23, 1999, Via train No. 74 travelling eastward at Mile 46.7 on the CN Chatham Subdivision in Thamesville, Ontario derailed after a switch was left open by a CN worker causing the train to jump the tracks and collide with stationary hoppers on the adjacent track, derailing the locomotive and its four-passenger cars. The two engineers were killed and 77 of the 186 passengers injured, four seriously. Approximately 50 m of the main track and 100 m of the yard track were destroyed.
- On November 23, 1999, Via train No. 68 derailed in Bowmanville, Ontario, after striking debris from a collision between a CN freight train and a transport truck at a farm crossing on Symons Road along the CN Kingston Subdivision. The locomotive and five passenger cars derailed after parts of the truck became lodged under the wheels, and a fire broke out after fuel leaked from the wreckage. Minor injuries were sustained by six Via employees and five passengers.
- On April 12, 2001, the Ocean bound for Montreal derailed in Stewiacke, Nova Scotia, at a manually operated main track switch. A standard CN switch lock used to secure the switch in correct position had been tampered with. The two locomotives and the first two cars continued on the main track, but the following cars took a diverging route onto an industrial track adjacent to the main track. Nine of the cars derailed and a farm supply building, as well as the industrial track were destroyed. Four occupants of the building escaped without injury prior to impact. There were 132 persons on board the train. 22 persons were transported to hospital in either Truro or Halifax. Nine were seriously injured. A 15-year-old boy pleaded guilty to the charge of mischief endangering life relating to the lock tampering.
- On February 26, 2012, Via Train No. 92 en route to Toronto, derailed in Burlington, Ontario, killing all three railroad engineers and injuring 46 (three seriously). The cause of the derailment is attributed to the excessive speed of the train travelling through a switch from track 2 to track 3.
- 2013 Via Rail Canada terrorism plot: In April 2013, two men inspired by al-Qaeda were charged with plotting to derail a Via train in the Greater Toronto Area. In 2015, both men were convicted of terrorism-related offenses and sentenced to life imprisonment. One of the two men was mentally unstable and misdiagnosed with schizophrenia.
- On September 18, 2013, a collision occurred between train No. 51 and a double-decker OC Transpo bus that failed to stop at a level crossing in Ottawa, Ontario. Six people were killed and 31 injured (11 critically), all of whom were on the bus. The impact resulted in the train derailing approximately 100–200 feet (30–61 m) down the track.
- On July 5, 2018, a train with 16 passengers and five crew members derailed north of Hudson Bay, Saskatchewan, while travelling from Winnipeg to Churchill. Passengers and crew sustained only minor injuries, but it took several hours for emergency crews to arrive due to the remote location of the incident. Paramedics and firefighters had to wait near the tracks for CN rail trucks to arrive that could transport them to the crash site.
- On December 31, 2019, a train with five crew and seven passengers derailed and tipped on its side near Katrime, Manitoba. No one was seriously injured.
- On December 23, 2022, Via shut down its Toronto–Ottawa and Toronto–Montreal corridors amid a winter storm, with nine trains becoming trapped overnight including one on the Toronto–Windsor corridor. Two other Via trains that had departed were ordered to return to station. A tree fell on train 55 from Ottawa to Toronto resulting in passengers being trapped on board for 15 hours; a rescue train was required which coupled onto train 55. Subsequently, a car on a CN train derailed in Kingston shutting down the entire Toronto–Montreal corridor on December 25 and 26. On December 25 alone Via cancelled 25 trains. Via compensated the hundreds of affected customers with refunds and vouchers.

== Coat of arms ==
Coat of arms of Via Rail
Notes Granted May 15, 2020. Crest A locomotive wheel Or issuant from a coronet erablé Gules. Escutcheon Per fess Sable and Or, in chief a bar fracted of five pieces Or and in base two bendlets sinister Sable all within a bordure Or. Supporters Two lynx Or each standing on a sandy base set with a bed of crushed stone Proper. Motto Via per fines nostros (Latin for 'the way across the country')

== See also ==
- Via Rail Canada Police Service
- List of Via Rail stations
- List of Via Rail rolling stock
- Proposed high-speed rail by country
