= Rapido (train) =

Defunct Canadian National Railway express passenger train service

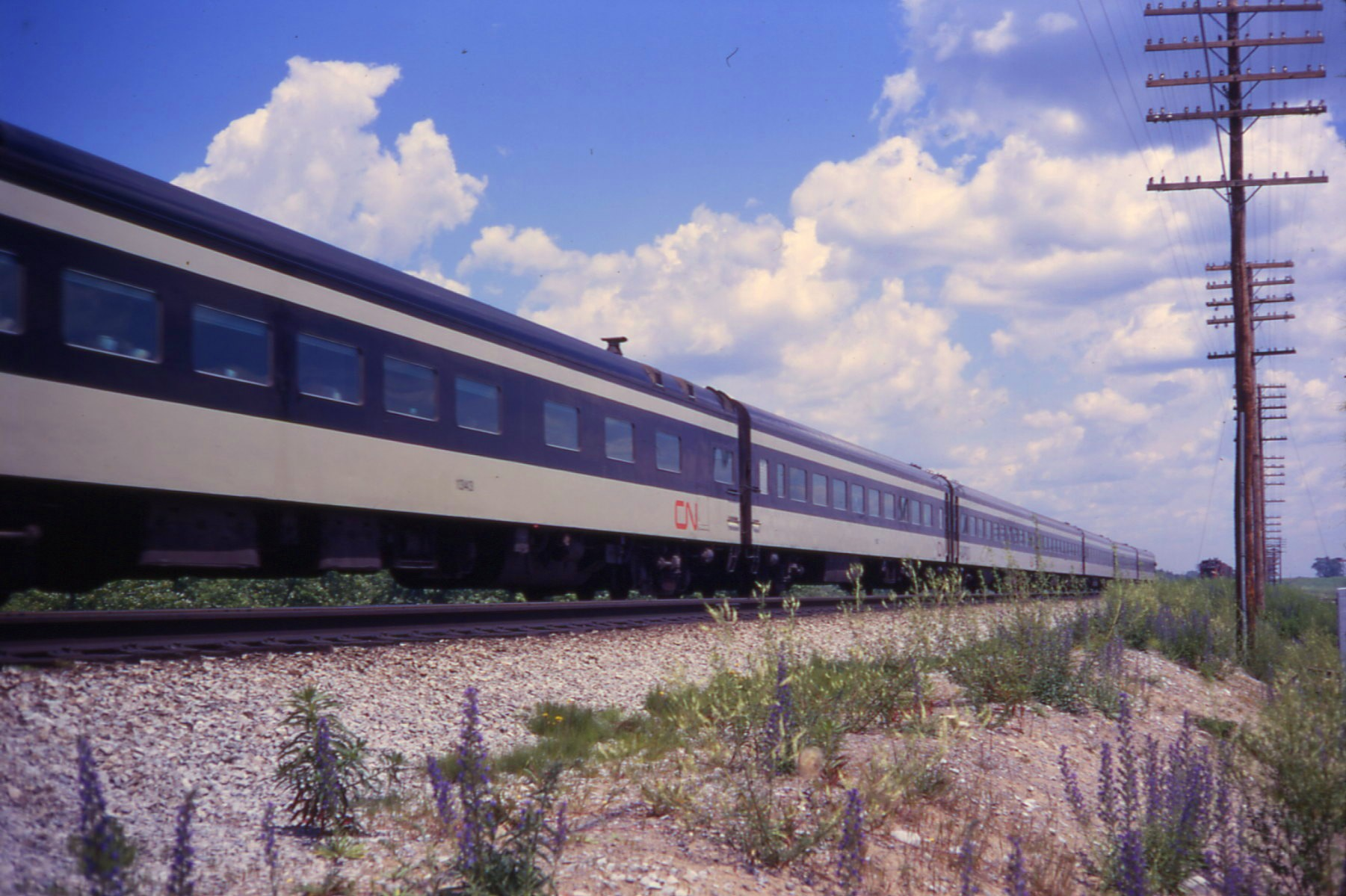
A Rapido service at Pickering, Ontario in July 1968

Rapido was the brand name for the Canadian National's express passenger train service in the Quebec City–Windsor Corridor. Rapido service was introduced on October 31, 1965, and lasted until the end of Canadian National passenger train service with its transfer to Via Rail on October 29, 1978.

Rapido service began on the Montreal–Toronto route. In 1966, service was extended to the Montreal–Quebec City route and later, to other city pairs, including Toronto–Windsor, Toronto–Sarnia, Toronto–Ottawa and Montreal–Ottawa.

In addition to being branded as Rapido, each express train was also given a name related to the route's particular geographical or historical context. Some names included Frontenac (after the Château Frontenac hotel in Quebec City), Rideau (after the Rideau Canal in Ottawa) and Ville-Marie (the historic name for Montreal).

A "bistro" car was occasionally included in Rapido service trains. Piano-based entertainment and alcoholic beverages were offered in these specially outfitted cars which were lit with red bulbs which were meant to create a party atmosphere on the trip between Toronto, Kingston, and Montreal.

The Rapido brand name continued to be used for advertising material and timetables by Via Rail into the 1980s. The brand name likely survived until Via was able to complete the reorganization and integration of Canadian National and Canadian Pacific passenger train schedules. By the end of the 1980s, Via Rail began to increasingly refer to the Corridor for branding all passenger trains operating from Quebec City–Windsor, regardless of speed or class of service. Most dedicated train names were removed and trains began to be identified by number only.

In the mid-2000s, the "Rapido" name was adopted by Canada-based model railroad manufacturing company Rapido Trains Inc.
