= British railway rolling stock =

Trains used in Great Britain

Various rolling stock, the vehicles used on railways, are used in Great Britain (England, Scotland and Wales). This article does not include those from Northern Ireland.

== Main line operators ==
These lists only include trains currently reported in use on Network Rail routes. For details of previous rolling stock and future deliveries, you should see the pages for the individual operators or the alternative lists in the 'see also' section at the bottom of this page.

Electrified routes generally use either 25 kV AC supplied by overhead lines, or 750 V DC third rail. The majority of self-powered trains are diesel, but other systems are being developed. Some trains use a combination of these power systems so that they can use different routes.

=== Multiple units and railcars ===
Operator	Image	Class	Design	Power source	Top Speed		Quantity of units	Carriages per unit	Notes
Operator	Image	Class	Design	Power source	mph	km/h	Quantity of units	Carriages per unit	Notes
Avanti West Coast		390/0	Pendolino	AC electric	125	200	21	9	
Avanti West Coast		390/1	Pendolino	AC electric	125	200	35	11	
Avanti West Coast		805	AT300	AC electric and diesel	125	200	13	5	Evero
Avanti West Coast		807	AT300	AC electric	125	200	10	7	Evero
c2c		357/0	Electrostar	AC electric	100	160	46	4	
c2c		357/2	Electrostar	AC electric	100	160	11	4	
c2c		357/3	Electrostar	AC electric	100	160	17	4	
c2c		720/6	Aventra	AC electric	110	177	12	5	
Chiltern Railways		165/0	Networker	Diesel	75	120	28	2	
Chiltern Railways		165/0	Networker	Diesel	75	120	11	3	
Chiltern Railways		168/0	Turbostar	Diesel	100	160	5	4	
Chiltern Railways		168/1	Turbostar	Diesel	100	160	6	3	
Chiltern Railways		168/1	Turbostar	Diesel	100	160	2	4	
Chiltern Railways		168/2	Turbostar	Diesel	100	160	3	3	
Chiltern Railways		168/2	Turbostar	Diesel	100	160	3	4	
Chiltern Railways		168/3	Turbostar	Diesel	100	160	9	2	
CrossCountry		170/1	Turbostar	Diesel	100	160	7	2	
CrossCountry		170/1	Turbostar	Diesel	100	160	10	3	
CrossCountry		170/3	Turbostar	Diesel	100	160	2	3	
CrossCountry		170/6	Turbostar	Diesel	100	160	10	3	
CrossCountry		220	Voyager	Diesel	125	200	34	4	
CrossCountry		221	Voyager	Diesel	125	200	4	4	
CrossCountry		221	Voyager	Diesel	125	200	32	5	
East Midlands Railway		158/0	Sprinter	Diesel	90	145	26	2	
East Midlands Railway		170/2	Turbostar	Diesel	100	160	4	2	
East Midlands Railway		170/2	Turbostar	Diesel	100	160	8	3	
East Midlands Railway		170/4	Turbostar	Diesel	100	160	8	3	
East Midlands Railway		170/5	Turbostar	Diesel	100	160	23	2	
East Midlands Railway		222/0	Voyager	Diesel	125	200	18	5	
East Midlands Railway		222/0	Voyager	Diesel	125	200	1	7	
East Midlands Railway		222/1	Voyager	Diesel	125	200	4	5	
East Midlands Railway		360/1	Desiro	AC electric	110	180	21	4	
East Midlands Railway		810	AT300	AC electric and diesel	125	200	33	5	Aurora
Elizabeth line		345	Aventra	AC electric	90	145	71	9	
Eurostar		373	TGV TMST	AC electric	186	300	11	18	Eurostar e300 - also operates on 1,500 V DC overhead in Europe
Eurostar		374	Velaro	AC electric	200	320	17	16	Eurostar e320 - also operates on 1,500 V DC overhead in Europe
First Rail London
First Rail London		378/1	Electrostar	DC electric	75	120	20	5	
First Rail London		378/2	Electrostar	AC and DC electric	75	120	37	5	
First Rail London		710/1	Aventra	AC electric	75	120	30	4	
First Rail London		710/2	Aventra	AC and DC electric	75	120	18	4	
First Rail London		710/3	Aventra	AC and DC electric	75	120	6	5	
Gatwick Express		387/2	Electrostar	AC and DC electric	110	177	22	4	
Grand Central		180	Coradia	Diesel	125	200	12	5	
Grand Central		221	Voyager	Diesel	125	200	2	5	
Great Northern		379	Electrostar	AC and DC electric	100	160	30	4	
Great Northern		387/1	Electrostar	AC and DC electric	110	177	16	4	
Great Northern		717	Desiro	AC and DC electric	85	137	25	6	
Great Western Railway
Great Western Railway		150/2	Sprinter	Diesel	75	120	20	2	
Great Western Railway		158/0	Sprinter	Diesel	90	145	13	2	
Great Western Railway		158/0	Sprinter	Diesel	90	145	5	3	
Great Western Railway		165/1	Networker	Diesel	90	145	20	2	
Great Western Railway		165/1	Networker	Diesel	90	145	16	3	
Great Western Railway		166	Networker	Diesel	90	145	21	3	
Great Western Railway		175/0	Coradia	Diesel	100	160	10	2	To be progressively introduced from December 2025.
Great Western Railway		175/1	Coradia	Diesel	100	160	16	3	To be progressively introduced from December 2025.
Great Western Railway		230	D-Train	Battery-electric	60	100	1	3	Trial Saturday-only service on the Greenford branch line
Great Western Railway		387/1	Electrostar	AC electric	110	177	42	4	Includes 12 for Heathrow Express services.
Great Western Railway		800/0	AT300	AC electric and diesel	125	200	36	5	InterCity Express Train
Great Western Railway		800/3	AT300	AC electric and diesel	125	200	21	9	InterCity Express Train
Great Western Railway		802/0	AT300	AC electric and diesel	125	200	22	5	InterCity Express Train
Great Western Railway		802/1	AT300	AC electric and diesel	125	200	14	9	InterCity Express Train
Greater Anglia		720/1	Aventra	AC electric	100	160	44	5	
Greater Anglia		720/5	Aventra	AC electric	100	160	89	5	
Greater Anglia		745/0	FLIRT	AC electric	100	160	10	12	InterCity services with first class seating area
Greater Anglia		745/1	FLIRT	AC electric	100	160	10	12	Stansted Express sets, standard class only
Greater Anglia		755/3	FLIRT	AC electric and diesel	100	160	14	3	
Greater Anglia		755/4	FLIRT	AC electric and diesel	100	160	24	4	
Hull Trains		802/3	AT300	AC electric and diesel	125	200	5	5	Paragon
London North Eastern Railway		800/1	AT300	AC electric and diesel	125	200	13	9	Azuma
London North Eastern Railway		800/2	AT300	AC electric and diesel	125	200	10	5	Azuma
London North Eastern Railway		801/1	AT300	AC electric	125	200	12	5	Azuma
London North Eastern Railway		801/2	AT300	AC electric	125	200	30	9	Azuma
Locomotive Services Limited		121	British Rail	Diesel	70	110	1	1	
Locomotive Services Limited		142	Pacer	Diesel	75	120	1	2	
Lumo		222/6	Voyager	Diesel	125	200	5	6	
Lumo		803	AT300	AC electric	125	200	5	5	
Merseyrail		777/0	METRO	DC electric	75	120	46	4	Powered only from third rail.
Merseyrail		777/1	METRO	DC electric	75	120	7	4	Top speed 75 mph (121 km/h) from third rail or 62 mph (100 km/h) from battery.
Network Rail		153	Sprinter	Diesel	75	120	4	1	Track inspection
Network Rail		950	Sprinter	Diesel	75	120	1	2	Test train based on Class 150 design.
Northern Trains		150/0	Sprinter	Diesel	75	120	8	3	
Northern Trains		150/1	Sprinter	Diesel	75	120	41	2	
Northern Trains		150/2	Sprinter	Diesel	75	120	25	2	
Northern Trains		155	Sprinter	Diesel	75	120	7	2	
Northern Trains		156	Sprinter	Diesel	75	120	66	2	
Northern Trains		158/0	Sprinter	Diesel	90	145	8	3	
Northern Trains		158/0	Sprinter	Diesel	90	145	35	2	
Northern Trains		158/9	Sprinter	Diesel	90	145	10	2	
Northern Trains		170/4	Turbostar	Diesel	100	160	16	3	
Northern Trains		195/0	Civity	Diesel	100	160	25	2	
Northern Trains		195/1	Civity	Diesel	100	160	33	3	
Northern Trains		323	Hunslet Transportation Projects	AC electric	90	145	34	3	
Northern Trains		331/0	Civity	AC electric	100	160	31	3	
Northern Trains		331/1	Civity	AC electric	100	160	12	4	
Northern Trains		333	CAF/Siemens	AC electric	100	160	16	4	
Northern Trains		769/4	British Rail Mark 3	AC electric and diesel	100	160	8	4	
ScotRail		153	Sprinter	Diesel	75	120	5	1	
ScotRail		156	Sprinter	Diesel	75	120	42	2	
ScotRail		158/0	Sprinter	Diesel	90	145	40	2	
ScotRail		170/3	Turbostar	Diesel	100	160	4	3	
ScotRail		170/4	Turbostar	Diesel	100	160	30	3	Later units of this subclass have the later-style headlights/tail lights
ScotRail		318	British Rail Mark 3	AC electric	90	145	21	3	
ScotRail		320/3	British Rail Mark 3	AC electric	90	145	22	3	
ScotRail		320/4	British Rail Mark 3	AC electric	100	160	12	3	Modified from Class 321 four-car units
ScotRail		334	Juniper	AC electric	90	145	40	3	
ScotRail		380/0	Desiro	AC electric	100	160	22	3	
ScotRail		380/1	Desiro	AC electric	100	160	16	4	
ScotRail		385/0	AT200	AC electric	100	160	46	3	
ScotRail		385/1	AT200	AC electric	100	160	24	4	
Sheffield Supertram		399	Citylink	AC and DC electric	62	100	5 (Note: 7 399s built, but only 5 do some train running as 2 are used 'tram-only')	3	Tram-train, can operate on Supertram 750 V DC overhead or Network Rail 25 kV AC overhead. Articulated tram with three body sections.
Southeastern		375/3	Electrostar	DC electric	100	160	10	3	
Southeastern		375/6	Electrostar	DC electric	100	160	30	4	
Southeastern		375/7	Electrostar	DC electric	100	160	15	4	
Southeastern		375/8	Electrostar	DC electric	100	160	30	4	
Southeastern		375/9	Electrostar	DC electric	100	160	27	4	Outer suburban sets
Southeastern		376	Electrostar	DC electric	75	120	36	5	
Southeastern		377/5	Electrostar	AC and DC electric	100	160	23	4	
Southeastern		395	AT300	AC and DC electric	140	225	29	6	Javelin
Southeastern		465/0	Networker	DC electric	75	120	50	4	
Southeastern		465/1	Networker	DC electric	75	120	47	4	
Southeastern		465/9	Networker	DC electric	75	120	24	4	Rebuilt from 465/2
Southeastern		466	Networker	DC electric	75	120	31	2	
Southeastern		707	Desiro City	DC electric	100	160	30	5	City Beam
Southern		171/2	Turbostar	Diesel	100	160	1	3	
Southern		171/7	Turbostar	Diesel	100	160	4	2	
Southern		171/8	Turbostar	Diesel	100	160	12	3	
Southern		377/1	Electrostar	DC electric	100	160	64	4	Later units of this subclass have the later-style headlights/tail lights
Southern		377/2	Electrostar	AC and DC electric	100	160	15	4	
Southern		377/3	Electrostar	DC electric	100	160	28	3	Modified from 375/3
Southern		377/4	Electrostar	DC electric	100	160	75	4	
Southern		377/6	Electrostar	DC electric	100	160	26	5	
Southern		377/7	Electrostar	AC and DC electric	100	160	8	5	
Southern		387/2	Electrostar	AC and DC electric	100	160	4	4	
South Western Railway		158	Sprinter	Diesel	90	145	10	2	
South Western Railway		159	Sprinter	Diesel	90	145	29	3	
South Western Railway		444	Desiro	DC electric	100	160	45	5	
South Western Railway		450	Desiro	DC electric	100	160	127	4	
South Western Railway		458	Juniper	DC electric	100	160	30	4	
South Western Railway		484	D-Train	DC electric	60	97	5	2	Isle of Wight services
South Western Railway		701/0	Aventra	DC electric	100	160	60	10	Arterio; still entering service
Thameslink		700/0	Desiro City	AC and DC electric	100	160	60	8	
Thameslink		700/1	Desiro City	AC and DC electric	100	160	55	12	
TransPennine Express		185	Desiro	Diesel	100	160	51	3	
TransPennine Express		397	Civity	AC electric	125	200	12	5	TransPennine Express 'Nova 2'
TransPennine Express		802/2	AT300	AC electric and diesel	125	200	19	5	TransPennine Express 'Nova 1'
Transport for Wales		150/2	Sprinter	Diesel	75	120	19	2	
Transport for Wales		153	Sprinter	Diesel	75	120	25	1	
Transport for Wales		158/0	Sprinter	Diesel	90	145	22	2	
Transport for Wales		197/0	Civity	Diesel	100	160	51	2	
Transport for Wales		197/1	Civity	Diesel	100	160	26	3	
Transport for Wales		230	D-Train	Battery-electric and diesel	60	97	5	3	
Transport for Wales		231	FLIRT	Diesel	90	145	11	4	
Transport for Wales		398	Citylink	AC electric and battery-electric	62	100	36	3	Tram-trains. Still entering service.
Transport for Wales		756/0	FLIRT	AC electric, battery-electric and diesel	75	120	7	3	
Transport for Wales		756/1	FLIRT	AC electric, battery-electric and diesel	75	120	17	4	
Vintage Trains		144	Pacer	Diesel	75	120	3	3	
West Midlands Trains		139	Parry People Mover	LPG and flywheel	40	64	2	1	
West Midlands Trains		150/1	Sprinter	Diesel	75	120	3	2	
West Midlands Trains		172/0	Turbostar	Diesel	75	120	8	2	
West Midlands Trains		172/1	Turbostar	Diesel	100	160	4	2	
West Midlands Trains		172/2	Turbostar	Diesel	100	160	12	2	
West Midlands Trains		172/3	Turbostar	Diesel	100	160	15	3	
West Midlands Trains		196/0	Civity	Diesel	100	160	12	2	
West Midlands Trains		196/1	Civity	Diesel	100	160	14	4	
West Midlands Trains		350/1	Desiro	AC electric	110	177	30	4	
West Midlands Trains		350/3	Desiro	AC electric	110	177	10	4	
West Midlands Trains		350/4	Desiro	AC electric	110	177	10	4	
West Midlands Trains		730/0	Aventra	AC electric	90	145	48	3	
West Midlands Trains		730/2	Aventra	AC electric	110	177	36	5	

=== Locomotives ===
Operator	Image	Class	Power source	Maximum speed		Quantity	Notes
Operator	Image	Class	Power source	mph	km/h	Quantity	Notes
Caledonian Sleeper		73/9	Diesel	90	145	6	DC electric pick up equipment removed from these locomotives, leased from GB Railfreight
Caledonian Sleeper		92	AC and DC electric	87	140	7	Leased from GB Railfreight
Chiltern Railways		68	Diesel	100	160	15	13+hot spare+rescue-only
Colas Rail		37/0	Diesel	90	140	8	
Colas Rail	37421	37/4	Diesel	90	140	2	
Colas Rail		37/6	Diesel	90	140	2	
Colas Rail		43	Diesel	125	200	10	
Colas Rail		56	Diesel	80	129	10	
Colas Rail		66	Diesel	75	120	5	
Colas Rail		67	Diesel	125	200	2	
Colas Rail		70	Diesel	75	120	17	
DB Cargo UK		66	Diesel	75	120	135	
DB Cargo UK		67	Diesel	125	200	25	Includes locomotives leased to Transport for Wales.
DB Cargo UK		92	AC and DC electric	87	140	8	
DCRail		56	Diesel	80	129	3	
DCRail		60	Diesel	60	97	4	
Direct Rail Services
Direct Rail Services		57/0	Diesel	75	120	9	
Direct Rail Services		57/3	Diesel	95	153	8	
Direct Rail Services		66	Diesel	75	120	24	
Direct Rail Services		68	Diesel	100	160	19	
Direct Rail Services		88/0	AC electric and diesel	100	160	10	
East Midlands Railway		08	Diesel	15	24	4	
Freightliner (CMA CGM)		08	Diesel	15	24	9	
Freightliner (CMA CGM)		66	Diesel	75	120	49	
Freightliner (CMA CGM)		90	AC electric	110	177	23	
GB Railfreight		08	Diesel	15	24	3	
GB Railfreight		09	Diesel	27.5	44	2	
GB Railfreight		47/7	Diesel	75	121	3	
GB Railfreight		50	Diesel	100	161	2	
GB Railfreight		56	Diesel	80	129	18	
GB Railfreight		59	Diesel	60	97	1	
GB Railfreight		60	Diesel	60	97	10	
GB Railfreight		66	Diesel	75	120	92	
GB Railfreight		69	Diesel	80	129	16	
GB Railfreight		73/1	DC electric and diesel	90	145	9	
GB Railfreight		73/2	DC electric and diesel	90	145	3	
GB Railfreight		73/9	DC electric and diesel	90	145	5	Also 6 hired to Caledonian Sleeper
GB Railfreight		92	AC and DC electric	87	140	9	Also 7 hired to Caledonian Sleeper
Great Western Railway		08	Diesel	15	24	8	
Great Western Railway		57/6	Diesel	95	152	4	
Greater Anglia		08	Diesel	15	24	3	
Heavy Haul Rail		59	Diesel	75	120	14	
Heavy Haul Rail		66/4	Diesel	75	120	7	
Heavy Haul Rail		66/5	Diesel	75	120	29	
Heavy Haul Rail		66/6	Diesel	66	105	19	
Heavy Haul Rail		66/9	Diesel	75	120	4	
Heavy Haul Rail		70	Diesel	75	120	19	
Locomotive Services Limited		20	Diesel	75	120	2	
Locomotive Services Limited		37	Diesel	80	130	4	
Locomotive Services Limited		40	Diesel	90	140	1	
Locomotive Services Limited		43	Diesel	125	200	4	
Locomotive Services Limited		45	Diesel	90	145	1	
Locomotive Services Limited		47	Diesel	75	120	9	
Locomotive Services Limited		55	Diesel	100	160	2	
Locomotive Services Limited		60	Diesel	60	97	1	
Locomotive Services Limited		73/9	DC electric and diesel	90	145	1	
Locomotive Services Limited		86	AC electric	100	160	1	
Locomotive Services Limited		87	AC electric	110	180	1	
Locomotive Services Limited		90	AC electric	110	180	2	
London North Eastern Railway		91	AC electric	140	225	12	
Network Rail		08	Diesel	15	24	1	
Network Rail		43	Diesel	125	200	5	Used for the New Measurement Train
Network Rail		97	Diesel	80	130	4	Modified Class 37 locomotives.
RailAdventure		43	Diesel	125	200	8	6 power cars operational for empty stock movements plus 2 for spares
Rail Operations Group		37	Diesel	80	130	6	
Rail Operations Group		47/4	Diesel	75	120	6	
Rail Operations Group		57/3	Diesel	95	152	4	
ScotRail		43	Diesel	125	200	52	
Transport for Wales		67	Diesel	125	200	2	Additional locomotives leased from DB Cargo UK
West Coast Railways		03	Diesel	28.5	46	3	
West Coast Railways		08	Diesel	15	24	3	
West Coast Railways		33	Diesel	85	137	4	
West Coast Railways		37	Diesel	80	130	11	
West Coast Railways		47	Diesel	75	120	22	
West Coast Railways		57/0	Diesel	75	120	3	
West Coast Railways		57/3	Diesel	95	153	4	
West Coast Railways		57/6	Diesel	95	152	1	
West Coast Railways		86	AC electric	100	160	1	
West Midlands Trains		08	Diesel	15	24	2	

=== Passenger coaches and vans ===
Operator	Image		Type	Maximum speed		Quantity (Coaches)	Quantity (Driving trailer)	Notes
Operator	Coach	Driving trailer	Type	mph	km/h	Quantity (Coaches)	Quantity (Driving trailer)	Notes
Caledonian Sleeper		-	Mark 5	100	160	75	-	
Chiltern Railways			Mark 5A	125	200	52	14	for 13 Chiltern Explorer sets (one Driving Trailer is spare)
DB Cargo UK			Mark 3	125	200	3	1	
Great Western Railway		-	Mark 3	110	177	18	-	Night Riviera sleeper service
Locomotive Services Limited		-	Mark 1	100	160	-	-	
Locomotive Services Limited		-	Mark 2	100	160	-	-	
Locomotive Services Limited		-	Mark 3	125	200	-	-	
London North Eastern Railway			Mark 4	140	225	90	10	InterCity 225
Network Rail		-	Mark 1	100	160	-	-	
Network Rail			Mark 2	100	160	-	-	
Network Rail			Mark 3	125	200	5	-	New Measurement Train
ScotRail		-	Mark 3	125	200	120	-	High Speed Train
Transport for Wales			Mark 4	125	200	37	8	
West Coast Railways		-	Mark 1	100	160	-	-	
West Coast Railways		-	Mark 2	100	160	-	-	

=== Freight wagons ===
Examples of modern freight wagons used in Great Britain. Wagons with UIC codes may also operate in Europe.

Image	TOPS code	UIC code	Type	Wheels	Operator or customer	Usual traffic (and comments)
	BYA	-	Covered	8	DB Cargo UK	Steel
	FBA	-	Flat	8	GB Railfreight	Containers
	FEA	-	Open	8	Network Rail	Track components
	FLA	-	Flat	8	Freightliner	Containers (Low platform height for tall containers)
	FNA	-	Flat	8	Direct Rail Services	Nuclear flask
	FNA	Uas	Flat	8	Direct Rail Services	Nuclear flask
	FSA	-	Flat	8	Freightliner	Containers
	HHA	-	Hopper	8	Freightliner	Coal
	HIA	-	Hopper	8	Freightliner	Stone
	HOA	-	Hopper	8	DB Cargo UK	Stone
	HQA	-	Hopper	8	Network Rail	Ballast (Auto ballaster)
	HTA	-	Hopper	8	DB Cargo UK	Coal
	IEA	Ealnos	Open	8	Network Rail	Ballast
	IPA	Laadffoos	Flat	8	DB Cargo UK	Cars
	IYA	Sfhimms	Covered	8	DB Cargo UK	Steel
	JGA	-	Hopper	8	GB Railfreight	
	JHA	-	Hopper	8	Mendip Rail	Stone
	JIA	?	Hopper	8	Imerys	China clay
	JNA	-	Open	8	Mendip Rail	Stone
	JNA	Ealnos	Open	8	Mendip Rail	Stone
	JNA	-	Open	8	Network Rail	Ballast
	MBA	-	Open	8	DB Cargo UK	General goods
	MEA	-	Open	4	DB Cargo UK	Coal
	MJA	-	Open	8	GB Railfreight	General goods
	MLA	-	Open	8	GB Railfreight	Ballast
	MLA	-	Open	8	DB Cargo UK	Ballast or general goods
	MMA	Ealnos	Open	8	DB Cargo UK	Stone or general goods
	MRA	-	Open	8	Network Rail	Ballast (side tipping)
	MWA	Ealnos	Open	8	Freightliner	Stone or general goods
	PCA	-	Hopper	4	Blue Circle Industries	Cement powder
	VGA	-	Van	4	DB Cargo UK	General goods (British Rail design)
	YWA	-	Flat	8	Network Rail	Track components (British Rail 'Salmon' design)
	YXA	-	Flat	8	Network Rail	Track components
	YXA	Sfkmmss	Flat	8	Network Rail	Track components

== Other networks ==
- Docklands Light Railway rolling stock
- Eurotunnel rolling stock
- Glasgow Subway rolling stock
- London Underground rolling stock
- Tyne and Wear Metro rolling stock

== See also ==
British Rail and National Rail

- British Rail locomotive and multiple unit numbering and classification
- Steam locomotives of British Railways
- List of British Rail diesel multiple unit classes
- List of British Rail electric multiple unit classes
- List of British Rail modern traction locomotive classes

Other operators

- NI Rail (Northern Ireland, UK)
