= NS FLIRT Flex =

Regional Dutch passenger train

NS Flirt Flex
- Stock type: Electric multiple unit
- Manufacturer: Stadler Rail
- Family name: Stadler FLIRT4
- Entered service: 2030 (planned)
- Number under construction: 18 four-car sets 18 six-car sets
- Operator: NS Reizigers

Specifications
- Maximum speed: 160 kilometres per hour (99 mph)
- Electric systems: 1,500 V DC
- Safety systems: ATB-EG, ERTMS/ETCS
- Coupling system: Scharfenberg coupler
- Track gauge: 1,435 mm (4 ft 8 1/2 in)

The NS FLIRT Flex is a series of electric multiple unit (EMU) trainset ordered by the Nederlandse Spoorwegen (NS), from Swiss manufacturer Stadler Rail. The units are based on the Stadler FLIRT (Fast Light Innovative Regional Train) platform, which will operate as both Sprinter (local) and Intercity services on the Dutch railway network. They are expected to enter service in 2030.

== History ==
To meet anticipated passenger growth of up to 10% by 2030 and to modernize its fleet, NS embarked on an investment program totaling €2 billion for new rolling stock, which includes 60 double-decker trains (DDNG) from CAF and 109 high-speed trains (ICNG) from Alstom in addition to the FLIRT Flex order. The Flirt Flex represents the fifth generation of Sprinter trains in the NS fleet and adds to the existing 58 FLIRT trains previously purchased for sprinter services.

=== Tender and procurement ===
On 18 July 2022, NS Reizigers B.V. published a notice for the supply of new articulated electric trains sets. The tender outlined requirements for trains capable for both Sprinter and Intercity services. Key technical requirements included quick acceleration and deceleration for services with frequent stops, a service speed of 160 km/h, and operation on the 1.5 kV DC Dutch rail system.

On 19 November 2025, NS announced the contracted had been awarded to Stadler Rail. The base order consist of 36 FLIRT Flex trainsets, consisting of 18 four-car units and 18 six-car units, with a total capacity of over 8,000 seated passengers. The contract value was approximately 400 million euros and includes a 10-year framework agreement with options for additional trains, including multi-system units capable of cross-border operation to Germany and Belgium. The trains will be manufactured at Stadler's plant in Siedlce, Poland, with engineering conducted at Stadler's Prague office in the Czech Republic.

== Design and features ==
=== Technical specifications ===
The FLIRT Flex is based on Stadler's FLIRT4 platform, specifically the FLIRT 200 variant designed for intercity journeys. The trains feature Jacobs bogies and wide inter-car gangways, creating a spacious interior with low-floor accessibility. Key performance characteristics include a service speed of 160 km/h and quick acceleration and braking capabilities suitable for services with frequent stops.

=== Interior ===
The FLIRT Flex is configured with one-door per carriage and more seating space, resembling Intercity comfort levels. Both four-car and six-car variants will include first and second class compartments with 32 first-class seats in each configuration. The four-car variant will hold 304 passengers, of which 202 can be seated and 102 standing, while the six-car variant can hold 467 passengers with 302 seating and 165 standing.

The trains are designed to be comfortable, accessible, have spaces for wheelchair users and bicycles, and passenger information displays.

=== Exterior ===
The FLIRT Flex will feature the blue and yellow "Flow-style" livery.

== Planned operations ==
The primary role of the FLIRT Flex is to accommodate growing passenger numbers on the Dutch railway. The flexibility of using the trainsets for Sprinter and Intercity services will enable NS to optimize rolling stock utilization according to demand fluctuations.

The trains are scheduled to being delivery in 2030, with plans to deliver approximately one vehicles per month. The FLIRT Flex trainsets are ultimately intended to replace a portion of the existing Siemens/Bombardier Sprinter Light Trains (SLT) originally manufactured between 2007 and 2012.

Maintenance will be handled by NS subsidiary NedTrain.
