= CAF Civity =

Regional passenger train model

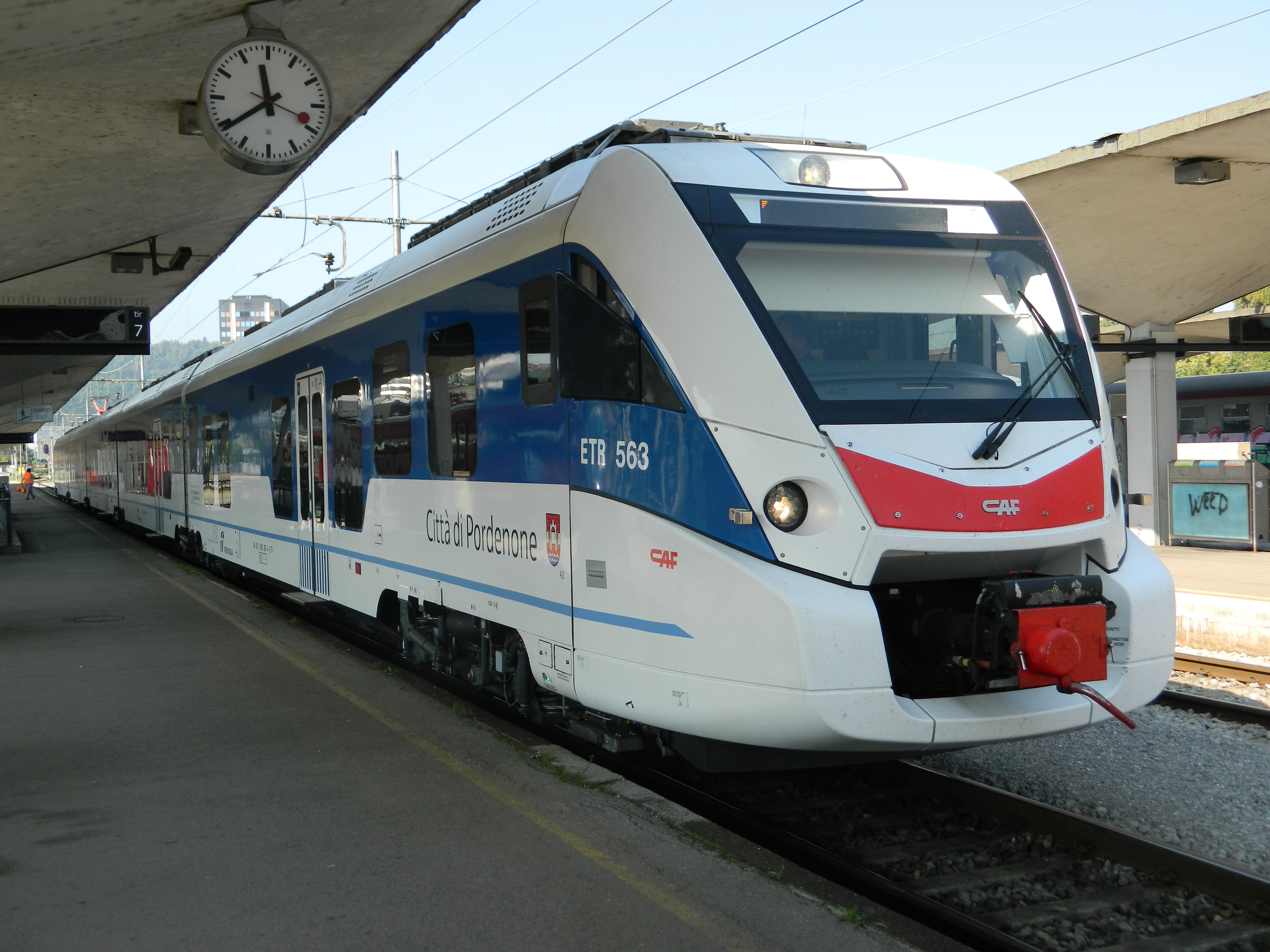
- ETR 563 at Ljubljana railway station
- Manufacturer: CAF
- Built at: Irun; Beasain; Zaragoza; Newport
- Constructed: 2012–present
- Number under construction: 261 units on order
- Number built: 251 units
- Formation: 2 to 8 cars per unit

Specifications
- Train length: 43–160 m (141 ft 1 in – 524 ft 11 in)
- Car length: 21.5 m (70 ft 6 in) (M); 16.2 m (53 ft 2 in) (T); 20 m (65 ft 7 in) (PH)
- Width: 2.88–2.95 m (9 ft 5 in – 9 ft 8 in)
- Height: 4.3 m (14 ft 1 in)
- Floor height: 600 mm (23.6 in)–1,150 mm (45.3 in)
- Maximum speed: 75–125 mph (120–200 km/h)
- Weight: c. 100 t (98.4 long tons; 110.2 short tons)
- Track gauge: 1,435 mm (4 ft 8 1/2 in) standard gauge

The CAF Civity is a family of regional passenger trains which is manufactured by Spanish rolling stock manufacturer Construcciones y Auxiliar de Ferrocarriles. Available as both diesel, electric and battery-electric multiple unit, the Civity was first launched in 2010 and received its first order two years later.

As of 2023, 251 Civity units have been constructed, with a further 261 on order. The United Kingdom is the largest customer of the platform with a total of 216 units ordered.

== Description ==
The Civity is a modular platform available in four variants, which are diesel, diesel-electric, electric and bi/dual mode. Most variants of the Civity platform, with the exception of the Civity UK and NSW, have shared bogies and a low floor.

=== Diesel ===
As of 2024, the diesel variant has only been ordered by operators in the United Kingdom (Northern, West Midlands Trains and Transport for Wales), with these units being constructed in either two, three or four-car formations. These trains will be fitted with MTU powerplants which produce 523 horsepower (390 kW) per engine (one engine per car), which will give them a maximum speed of 100 mph (160 km/h).

=== Electric ===
The electric variant is capable of operating on 1500 V or 3000 V DC power supplies with a pick-up shoe or 15 kV or 25 kV AC power supplies with a pantograph. It has so far been ordered in either three, four or five car formations, with these being capable of speeds between 75–125 mph (120–200 km/h).

== Operations ==
=== Australia ===
In February 2019, Transport for NSW signed a contract with Momentum Trains PPP to supply 117 Civity bi mode (diesel and 1500 V DC electric supply) carriages, a new maintenance centre in Dubbo and a maintenance contract as part of the Regional Rail Project. The new trains, referred to as the R sets, will replace the XPT (19 power cars and 60 carriages), Xplorer (23 carriages) and Endeavour (28 carriages) trains. The 117 new carriages will make up 10 diesel-electric trainsets for use on long-distance services linking Sydney, Melbourne and Brisbane, plus nine short and 10 long multiple-units for regional routes, a total of 29 trains. The trains have been heavily delayed and were due to commence in service in 2025, however further delays have pushed the entry to service date to 2028.

=== Germany ===
In June 2021, the Verkehrsverbund Rhein-Ruhr (VRR) and the Nahverkehr Westfalen-Lippe (NWL) announced that CAF, using its Civity platform, had been selected to build and maintain for 30 years, 63 battery electric multiple units (48 long and 15 short version) for the Niederrhein-Münsterland regional train network, comprising the RE10, RB37 (lot 1), RE14, RE44, RB31, RB36, RB41 and RB43 (lot 2) train services in the state of North Rhine-Westphalia. The fleet will be owned by the VRR and NWL and will be made available to DB Regio (lot 1) and the other train operating company that has yet to be selected (lot 2). The operations on the individual services are due to start between December 2025 and 2028. In 2022, the Nahverkehr Westfalen-Lippe ordered an additional 10 long units for operation on the RB68 (Münster – Sendenhorst) and RB76 (Verl – Gütersloh – Harsewinkel) services from December 2025.

=== Italy ===
In 2010, the Italian region of Friuli-Venezia Giulia placed an order with CAF for eight ETR 563 five-car units for Trenitalia. Four more units were subsequently ordered, with these units capable of operating services into Slovenia and Austria, with these being designated as ETR 564 units. The units were delayed into service as they could not be approved.

Five four-car ETR 452 trains have been built for Ferrotramviaria, a regional train operator in Bari, Apulia. They have been in use since 2014 and 2015.

=== Mexico ===
The El Insurgente commuter rail service between Mexico City and Toluca uses electric multiple units combining the Civity and the earlier Civia designs.

=== Montenegro ===
Three Class 6111 three-car EMUs were delivered to Željeznički prevoz Crne Gore (ŽPCG), the national railway company of Montenegro, specifically to serve the Podgorica-Nikšić railway, cutting travel time to 50 minutes. The first of the new trains started with service on 13 July 2013.

=== Netherlands ===
==== NS ====
In 2014, Nederlandse Spoorwegen (NS) placed a €510 million order for 118 Civity sets. These new trains, which will consist of three and four car formations, will replace the NS SGMm sets. The train is known as the Sprinter New Generation (SNG) by the NS. The trains will be delivered from 2018 and can operate at 160 km/h (100 mph). A mock-up of an SNG was presented in September 2015, featuring sockets, recycling bins and a toilet. An additional 88 sets were ordered in December 2018, with deliveries expected to continue through 2023.

In 2022 CAF won the Dubbeldekker Nieuwe Generatie tender for NS with Civity Duo, the first double decker of the Civity platform. The contract consists of 60 double decker train sets with 4 and 6 coaches, with an option to expand the contract to 80,000 seats.

==== Qbuzz ====
In 2024 Qbuzz placed an order for 10 three car Civity sets. These sets will replace 2 Stadler GTW 2/6 and 8 GTW 2/8 trainsets delivered in 2008–2011. The new trainsets will be in service by the end of 2027 and can operate at 160 km/h (100 mph). The replacement is part because of implementation of ERTMS and part because of having more doors and toilets.

=== Spain ===
In 2022, Renfe Viajeros placed an initial order for 28 EMUs for regional services with options for 42 additional trains, with an investment of €290 million. The next year, CAF received an extension for 32 more trains, extending the order to 60 trains. Those EMU will have a maximum speed of 200 km/h (125 mph), and will have three- and five-car versions.

=== Sweden ===
==== Krösatågen ====
In 2021, three of the six public transport agencies running regional trains under the Krösatågen brand (Jönköpings län, Kronobergs län and Kalmar län) have made a joint order for 20 electric units (EMU) named ER3, and 8 units that can be powered either by an external electricity supply or by using the onboard diesel engine (BMU) named BIR1. The contract also contain an option for another 19 EMUs and 7 BMUs through the leasing company Transitio. The trains will be of Civity Nordic version, designed for operation at temperatures of between −40 and 40 °C (−40 and 104 °F) and are set to arrive 2024–27 and will replace the X11s, X14s, Itinos and Y2s currently running in the regions. The maximum speed of EMUs will be 200 km/h (125 mph), that of the BMUs will be 200 km/h (125 mph) in electric mode and 140 km/h (87 mph) in diesel mode.

==== SJ X45 ====
In 2022, 25 (with an option for 35 more) SJ regional trains, scheduled to enter service in 2027 (originally 2026), will operate on regional routes including Stockholm-Västerås-Örebro-Skövde-Gothenburg, Linköping-Norrköping-Stockholm-Arlanda-Uppsala-Gävle-Ljusdal and Kalmar-Gothenburg. The trains are designed for cold weather conditions in Sweden, and can operate with a top speed of 200 km/h. The contract, valued at EUR 300 million, was awarded to CAF by SJ in 2022.

=== United Kingdom ===
==== Northern Trains ====
In January 2016, Arriva Rail North placed an order for 98 (later increased to 101) units, with the majority of these trains due to operate on the company's Northern Connect regional express services (now under operator Northern Trains). The order breakdown is for 58 (originally 55) Class 195 diesel multiple units (two and three-car) and 43 Class 331 electric multiple units (three and four-car). All of these trains were planned to gradually enter service throughout 2019.

In early 2018, it was revealed that there is an option for an undisclosed number of additional carriages. There is also a provision available to extend the four car Class 331 units to five carriages in the future.

The extra three Class 195 units were ordered in November 2018.

==== TransPennine Express ====
CAF built twelve Class 397 five-car electric multiple units for TransPennine Express for its West Coast Main Line services, which operate from Liverpool and Manchester Airport to Glasgow and Edinburgh. These units were due to be delivered between 2018 and 2019, replacing the four-car Class 350/4 units which were previously used on these services. They have a maximum speed of 125 mph (200 km/h).

==== West Midlands Trains ====
It was announced in late 2017 that CAF will also supply 26 Class 196 diesel multiple units for West Midlands Trains, which will be in two-car and four-car formations. They will operate services for the company's West Midlands Railway sub-brand.

==== Transport for Wales ====
In June 2018 it was announced that KeolisAmey Wales had ordered 51 two-car and 26 three-car diesel multiple Civitys, to be based at Chester and Machynlleth depots. These have since received the TOPS designation Class 197.

==== London North Eastern Railway ====
In November 2023 it was announced that London North Eastern Railway had ordered 10 ten-car tri-mode Civitys. They have since been classified as Class 897 units.

=== On order ===
==== Philippines ====
The Philippine National Railways confirmed the order of 7 Civity trains from Mitsubishi–CAF joint venture in 2023. These 8-car trains shall be used on the North–South Commuter Railway's Airport Express service with a maximum speed of 160 km/h (100 mph). Its design is based on the Mexican El Insurgente trains, distinguished by the use of 1.5 kilovolt DC electrification, gangway doors and the adoption of Japanese Shibata couplers.

For compatibility with the line's platform screen doors, the trains will have a 20,000 mm (65 ft 7 in) car length, 2,950 mm (9 ft 8 in) width and be 4,150 mm (13 ft 7 in) in height. It will also have a high platform design of 1,150 mm (3 ft 9 in) height as measured from the rails. The trains can fit up to 800 passengers with 392 seated, 8 wheelchair spaces and 400 standees.

Serbia

Srbijavoz on 30st March 2026 signed a €300 million contract with the manufacturer, order of 30 new commuter trainsets for the BGVoz suburban rail operator in Belgrade. In the document Srbijavoz wants trains that are going to replace older Soviet made EMU sets from the 1980s, be made for stop-start services and that have a high-demand capacity rate.

=== Cancelled orders ===
==== Latvia ====
In 2012, Latvian railway operator Pasažieru vilciens placed a €400 million order for 34 electric and seven diesel-electric multiple units. The order also included a 30-year maintenance plan for the units. The three car sets were to be built for the 1,520 mm (4 ft 11 27/32 in) Russian gauge and capable of operating on lines electrified at 3000V DC with a maximum speed of 140 km/h (90 mph). The order was subsequently cancelled, with no units built.

== Fleet details ==
Class	Image	Operator(s)	Type	No.	Cars	Built
Australia
R set		NSW TrainLink	BMU	19	3	2023–
R set		NSW TrainLink	BMU	10	6	2023–
Italy
ETR 452		Ferrotramviaria	EMU	5	4	2014–15
ETR 563		Trenitalia	EMU	8	5	2012–13
ETR 564		Trenitalia	EMU	4	5	2014
Montenegro
6111		Željeznički prevoz Crne Gore	EMU	3	3	2013
Netherlands
SNG		Nederlandse Spoorwegen	EMU	118	3	2018–2023
SNG		Nederlandse Spoorwegen	EMU	88	4	2018–2023
		Qbuzz MerwedeLingelijn	EMU	10		
Dubbeldekker Nieuwe Generatie		Nederlandse Spoorwegen	Civity Duo EMU	30	4	
Dubbeldekker Nieuwe Generatie		Nederlandse Spoorwegen	Civity Duo EMU	30	6	
United Kingdom
Class 195		Northern Trains	DMU	25	2	2017–2020
Class 195		Northern Trains	DMU	33	3	2017–2020
Class 196		West Midlands Trains	DMU	12	2	2019–2022
Class 196		West Midlands Trains	DMU	14	4	2019–2022
Class 197		Transport for Wales	DMU	51	2	2020–2026
Class 197		Transport for Wales	DMU	26	3	2020–2026
Class 331		Northern Trains	EMU	31	3	2017–2020
Class 331		Northern Trains	EMU	12	4	2017–2020
Class 397 Nova 2		TransPennine Express	EMU	12	5	2017–2019
Class 897		London North Eastern Railway	EDMU	10	10	not yet known
Germany
not yet known		not yet known (Niederrhein-Münsterland-Netz)	BEMU	60		2021–
Mexico
Commuter Train		Tren Interurbano México-Toluca "El Insurgente"	EMU	30	5	2016-2020

== See also ==
- Alstom Aventra
- Siemens Desiro
- Stadler FLIRT
- Pesa Elf
- Skoda 7Ev
- HZ series 6112
