= CAF Newport =

Rolling stock factory in Newport, Wales

- Staff and Welsh Transport Minister Ken Skates at CAF Newport in 2025

- Location within Newport
- Built: 2017/2018
- Operated: 2018 -
- Location: 1 Monks Ditch Drive Celtic Business Park; Llanwern, Newport, Wales
- Coordinates: 51.5798°N 2.9098°W
- Industry: Manufacturing
- Products: Rolling stock
- Employees: 200 (2020)
- Buildings: 4
- Volume: 160,000 square feet (15,000 m^{2}) (buildings); 500,000 square feet (46,000 m^{2}) (whole site)
- Owner: CAF

CAF Newport is a rolling stock factory located at Celtic Business Park, Llanwern, Newport, Wales. The site was announced as a train-building factory in 2016 and was producing rolling stock by 2018. It is owned and operated by CAF.

== History ==
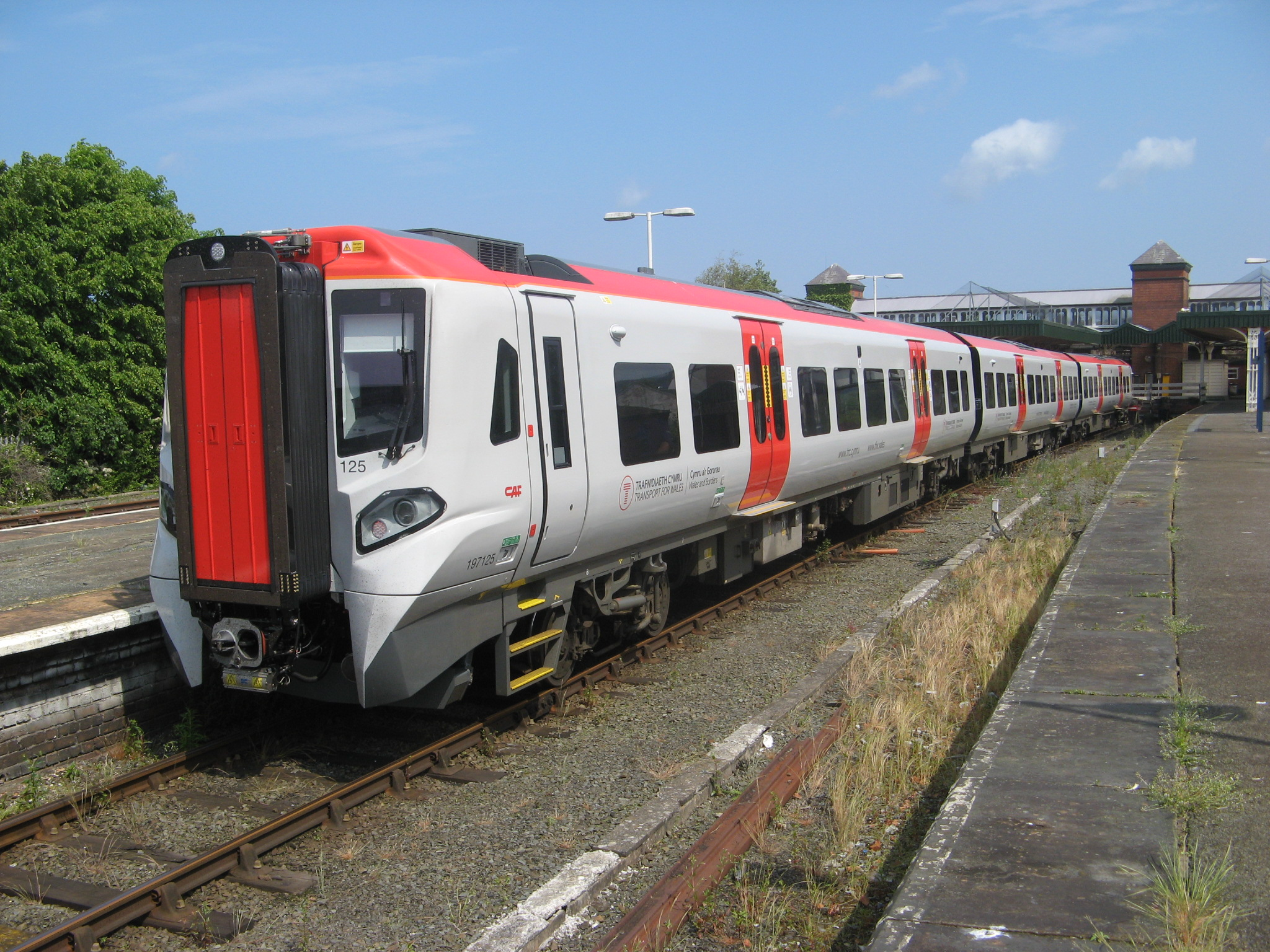
Transport for Wales Class 197

Since the 1990s, CAF have supplied trains for the UK rail network from its factories in Spain. Products have included Class 3000 and Class 4000 DMUs for NI Railways, Class 332s for Heathrow Express, Class 333s for Arriva Trains Northern, Class 195s and Class 331s for Arriva Rail North, Class 196s for West Midlands Trains, Class 197s for Transport for Wales, Class 397 and Mark 5s for TransPennine Express and Mark 5s for the Caledonian Sleeper. CAF also supplied Urbos 3 trams for Edinburgh and the West Midlands Metro.

When searching for a possible site to construct trains in the UK, CAF looked at over 100 different locations before settling on one on a part of the defunct Llanwern steelworks in South Wales. The site is located alongside sidings which follow the South Wales Main Line between Newport and Bristol Parkway, and the site has three main buildings: a three-road assembly plant, a five-road test shed, and a stores building. The west end of the site has a traverser, which enables easy access to lines without the need for excessive shunting, and a water test facility.

The project cost £30 million and the footprint of the buildings cover an area of 15,000 m^{2} (160,000 sq ft), with capacity to extend onsite as CAF own 46,000 m^{2} (500,000 sq ft). Expansion would have been be necessary to build the near 200-metre (660 ft) trains for HS2, if CAF had been successful in its bid. Initially, the site had just 12 employees, but that stood at 200 by the start of 2020. The company expects that the order book will necessitate expanding to 300 staff to fulfil those orders.

Construction of the factory by Bowmer + Kirkland commenced in 2017, with work completed in July 2018. It was officially opened by Prince Charles on 21 February 2020.

CAF had stated that should they be awarded the contract to build trains for HS2, then they would be assembled in South Wales on its Oaris platform. However in December 2021, the contract was awarded to a competing manufacturer.

The bodyshells, bogies and engines are manufactured off site, and bodyshells specifically are produced at CAF's plants in Beasain, Zaragosa and Irun, but assembly and other manufacturing is undertaken at Newport.

Production at the site was ceased in March 2020 after COVID-19 social distancing restrictions came into effect. Bodyshell deliveries from Spain had ceased two weeks before the factory's closure, and although it was possible to continue building without the bodyshell deliveries, it was felt that it was unable to keep the workers at a safe distance from each other.

== Classes assembled ==
- Class 195 (later units)
- Class 196 (most units)
- Class 197 (all units)
- Class 331 (one unit only; 331111)
- Some of the Urbos trams for the Tel Aviv Purple Line are being assembled in Newport.

== Classes to be assembled ==
- Class 897 (most units)

== Other ventures ==
CAF also have other business strands operating out of the Newport site; all UK rolling stock works are concentrated on the site including design, system engineering and support to projects such as the Mark 5 passenger coaches for the Caledonian Sleeper and TransPennine Express which were built outside of the UK.
