= British Rail Class 897 =

CAF tri-mode train

British Rail Class 897 Serenza
- Artist's impression of the Class 897
- In service: 2028 (planned)
- Manufacturer: CAF
- Built at: Spain; Newport, Wales
- Family name: Civity
- Replaced: InterCity 225
- Number under construction: 10
- Formation: 10 cars per unit
- Capacity: 569 (seated)
- Owner: Porterbrook
- Operator: London North Eastern Railway
- Depot: Neville Hill
- Line served: East Coast Main Line

Specifications
- Electric system: 25 kV 50 Hz AC overhead
- Current collection: Pantograph
- Track gauge: 1,435 mm (4 ft 8 1/2 in) standard gauge

The British Rail Class 897 Serenza is a type of tri-mode multiple unit to be manufactured by Construcciones y Auxiliar de Ferrocarriles (CAF) for London North Eastern Railway. Ten 10-car units will be built, powered by 25 kV 50 Hz electrification, as well as battery and diesel power.

== History ==
In 2013, the Department for Transport ordered 30 Class 801s to replace the same number of InterCity 225s on East Coast Main Line services. However, after Virgin Trains East Coast was awarded the InterCity East Coast franchise in 2015 with a commitment to introduce extra services, some InterCity 225 trains were retained.

In October 2020, London North Eastern Railway (LNER) issued a tender for ten electro-diesel multiple units to replace its remaining InterCity 225s. In November 2023, LNER placed an order with CAF for ten ten-carriage sets to be built on its Civity platform. The first two will be built in Spain, the other eight at Newport. The trains will be able to run on 25 kV 50 Hz electrification, battery and diesel power. They will be maintained at Neville Hill TMD.

In May 2025, LNER announced the new trains would be delayed with an expected introduction date sometime in 2028. In January 2026, LNER showed off the proposed interior design of the train, and announced that they plan to brand the fleet as Serenza, a portmanteau of the word "Serene" and the "Spanish-style suffix '-enza'".

== See also ==
- British Rail Class 195 – A diesel multiple unit variant of the CAF Civity UK platform built for Northern.
- British Rail Class 196 – A diesel multiple unit variant of the CAF Civity UK platform built for West Midlands Trains.
- British Rail Class 197 – A diesel multiple unit variant of the CAF Civity UK platform built for Transport for Wales Rail.
- British Rail Class 331 – An electric multiple unit variant of the CAF Civity UK platform built for Northern.
- British Rail Class 397 - An electric multiple unit variant of the CAF Civity UK platform built for TransPennine Express.
