= Bombardier Turbostar =

Group of British diesel multiple unit trains

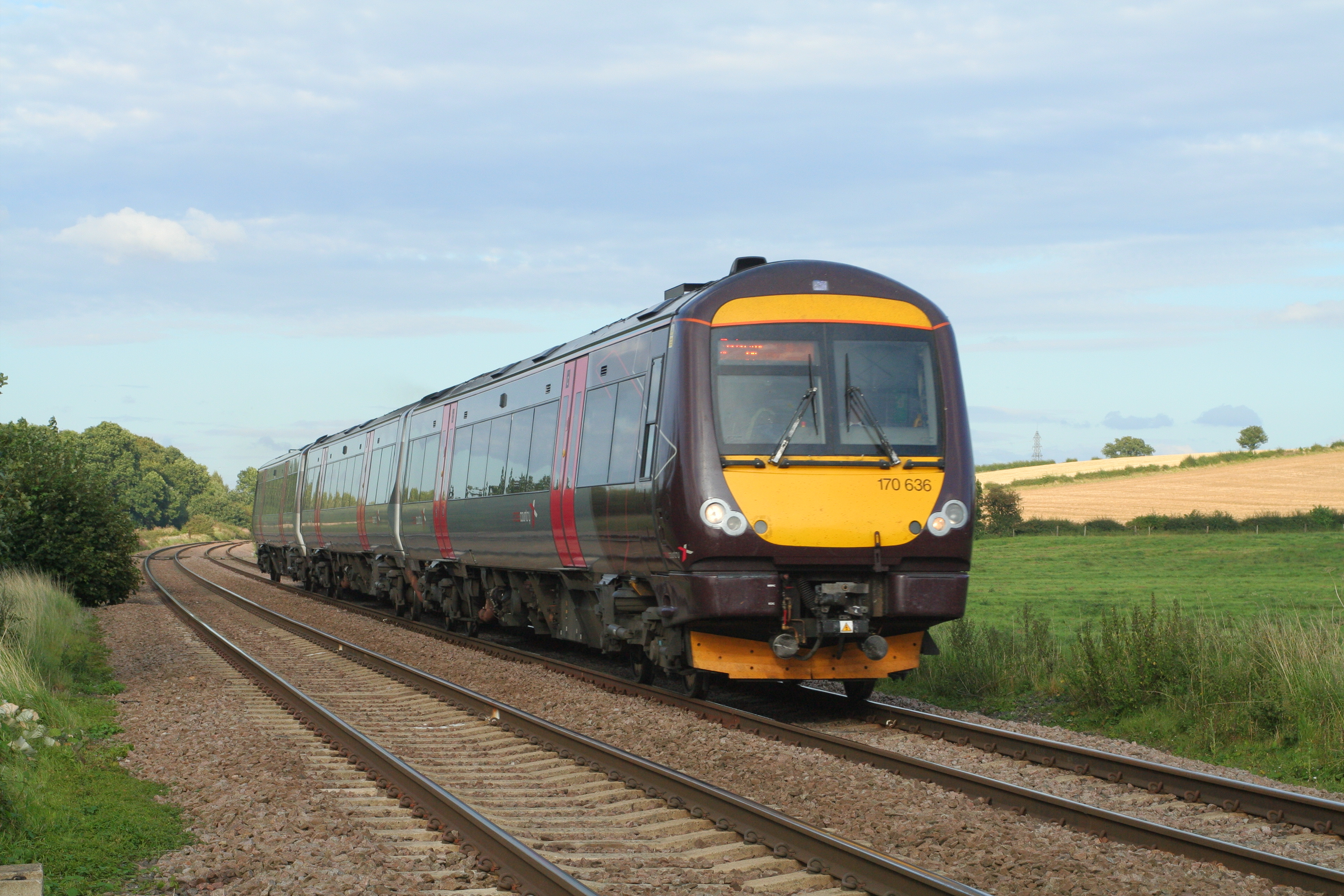
- Class 170 in CrossCountry livery, travelling westbound towards Leicester
- Stock type: DMU
- In service: 1998–present
- Manufacturers: Adtranz (1997–2001), Bombardier (2001–2011)
- Built at: Derby Litchurch Lane Works
- Constructed: 1997–2011
- Number built: 206 sets
- Formation: 2, 3 or 4 carriages per set
- Capacity: Varies depending on number of cars and seating configuration, see individual articles for details
- Owners: Angel Trains; Beacon Rail; Porterbrook
- Operators: Chiltern Railways, CrossCountry, East Midlands Railway, Northern Trains, ScotRail, Southern, West Midlands Railway

Specifications
- Car length: 23.62 m (77 ft 6 in)
- Width: 2.69 m (8 ft 10 in)
- Height: 3.77 m (12 ft 4 in)
- Maximum speed: 100 mph (160 km/h)
- Weight: Varies depending on number of cars and seating configuration, see individual articles for details
- Traction system: Hydraulic transmission (168/170/171), Mechanical transmission (172)
- Prime movers: MTU 6R 183TD13H (168/170/171); MTU 6H1800R83 (172)
- Safety systems: Various combinations of ATP, AWS, TPWS, Tripcock system
- Coupling system: BSI/Dellner couplers (Class 171, see below)
- Track gauge: 1,435 mm (4 ft 8 1/2 in) standard gauge

The Bombardier Turbostar (sold as the ADtranz Turbostar until 2001) is a group of diesel multiple unit (DMU) passenger trains that was built by ADtranz and later Bombardier Transportation at Derby Litchurch Lane Works, England, between 1997 and 2011. The Turbostar was the first new train type to be introduced after the privatisation of British Rail. The first units were ordered by Chiltern Railways in 1996 and were designated Class 168 (also known as Clubman). Since then the group has grown with the addition of Classes 170, 171 and 172.

== Description and technical details ==
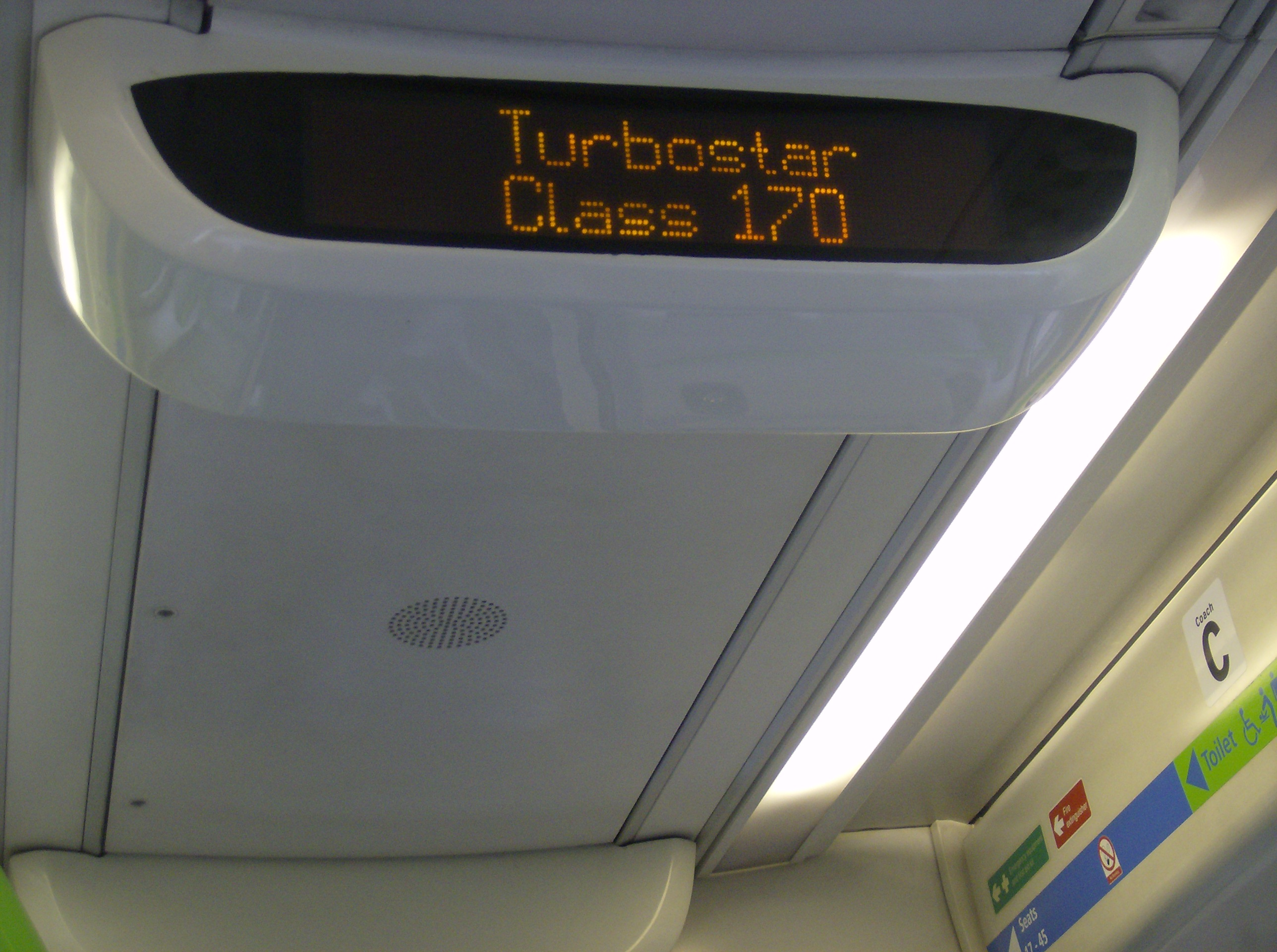
Turbostars feature onboard station monitors

The Turbostar and Electrostar platforms are a modular design, which share the same basic design, bodyshell and core structure, and are optimised for speedy manufacture and easy maintenance. They consist of a common underframe, which is created by seam-welding a number of aluminium alloy extrusions, upon which bodyside panels are mounted followed by a single piece roof, again made from extruded sections. The car ends (cabs) are made from glass-reinforced plastic and steel, and are Huck-bolted onto the main car bodies. Underframe components are collected in ‘rafts’, which are bolted into slots on the underframe extrusion. The mostly aluminium alloy body gives light weight to help acceleration and energy efficiency.

Much of the design of Classes 168/170/171 is derived from the Networker Turbo Class 165 and Class 166 trains built by British Rail Engineering Limited's Holgate Road carriage works in York. Notable features shared are the aluminium alloy frame and two-stage Voith T211r hydrodynamic transmission system. The diesel engine has changed to an MTU 6R 183TD13H. A cardan shaft links the output of the gearbox to ZF final drives (instead of Gmeinder in the Networkers) on the inner bogie of each vehicle. The engine and transmission are situated under the body; one bogie per car is powered, the other bogie unpowered.

The Class 172 differs mechanically to its older relations in several ways. The engine used is the more powerful and cleaner MTU 6H1800R83, the transmission is the mechanical ZF Ecomat 5HP 902R, and lighter Bombardier FLEXX-ECO bogies and hollow axles are used as well as half-height airdams. The exhaust system is also quieter and does not have the distinctive note of that of Classes 168/170/171.

Turbostars have been acquired for use by several train operating companies, each with different specifications. One of the more noticeable differences with later units compared to earlier ones are the larger headlights now specified for safety reasons.

=== Working in multiple ===
One factor which contributes to the popularity of the Turbostars is that Class 170 units are fully capable of working in multiple with older types from the Class 15x Sprinter series of units, as well as other units of the same class, unlike all other types built since privatisation, giving them greater flexibility.

However, there are issues with so-called "sandwich" formations, formed either as 170-15x-170 or 15x-170-15x, which causes problems with empty stock movements where up to four units of various types coupled together is common. A possible side effect of this is that Turbostars' performance is in line with the second generation 15x units, in fact being somewhat slower than a Class 150 or Class 156 on "short hop" workings, and slower than a Class 158 on longer distance workings unless there is enough 100 miles per hour (161 km/h) running to take advantage of the 10 miles per hour (16 km/h) higher top speed of the Class 170.

The Class 171 units are fitted with Dellner couplers rather than BSI (Bergische Stahl Industrie) couplers, which means that they can mechanically couple with Southern's Class 377 Electrostar electric multiple units for rescue purposes.

== Variants ==
Class	Image	Operator	Introduced	Number	Carriages	End gangways
168 Clubman		Chiltern Railways	1998	28	2, 3 or 4	No
170 Turbostar		CrossCountry, East Midlands Railway, Northern Trains, ScotRail	1998	122	2 or 3	No
171 Turbostar		Southern	2003	17	2 or 3	No
172 Turbostar		West Midlands Railway	2010	39	2 or 3	172/2 and 172/3 only
