= British Rail Class 196 =

British diesel multiple-unit (DMU) train built by CAF

British Rail Class 196 Civity
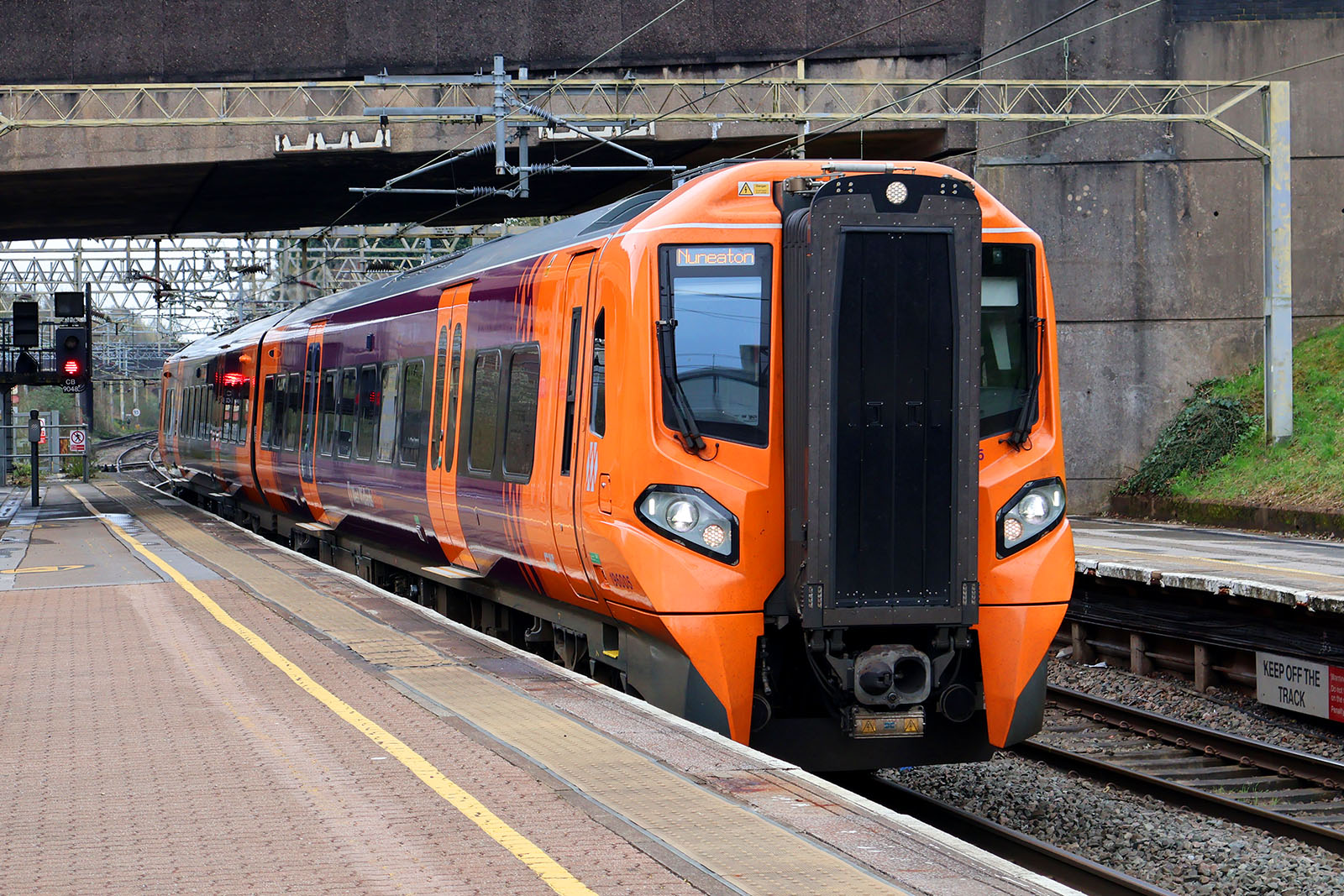
- Class 196 at Coventry

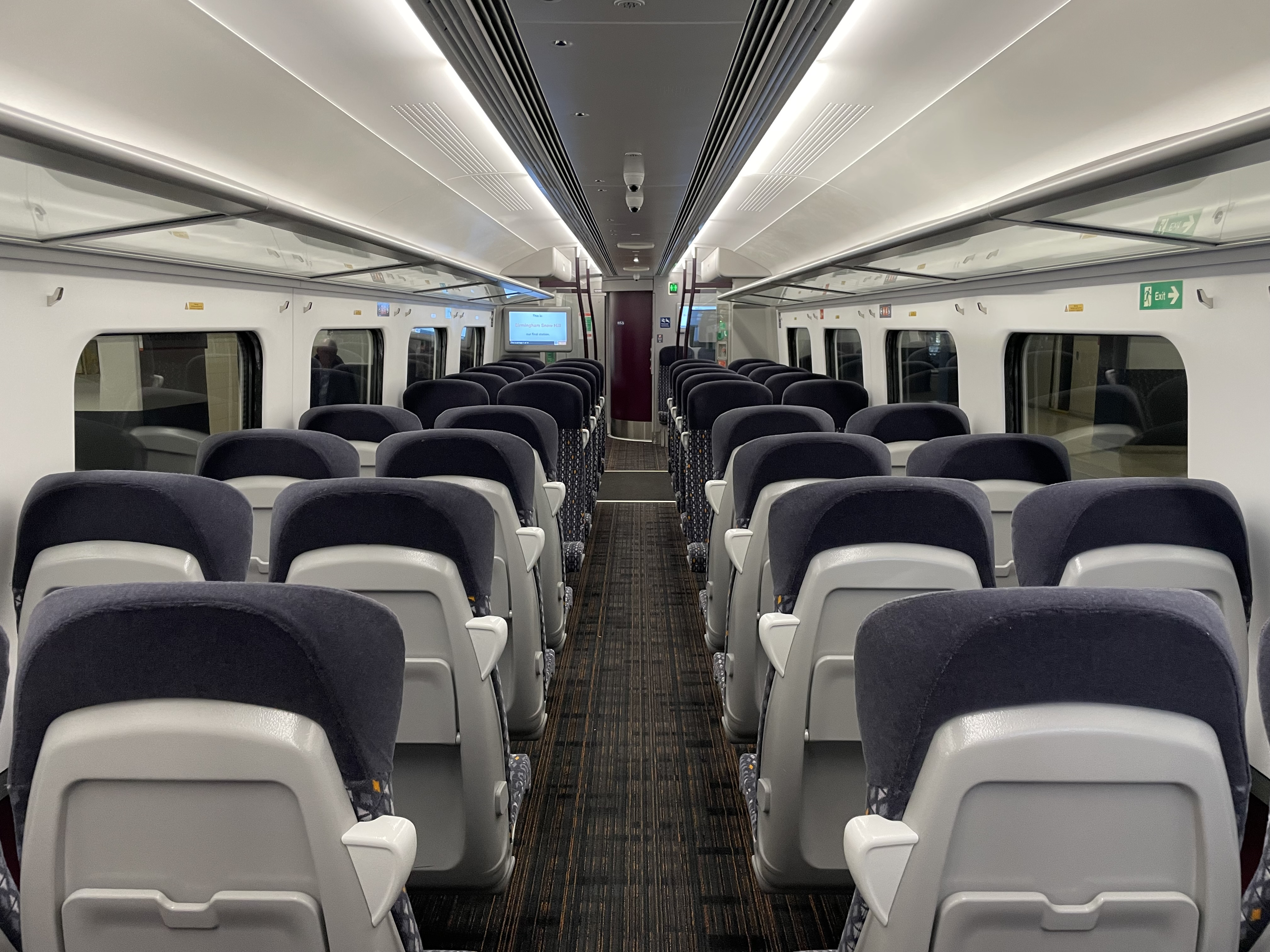
- Class 196 interior
- In service: 17 October 2022 – present
- Manufacturer: CAF
- Built at: Newport, Wales (final assembly)
- Family name: Civity
- Replaced: Class 170/5
- Constructed: 2019–2022
- Number built: 26; (12 x 196/0, 14 × 196/1)
- Formation: 2 cars per 196/0 unit: DMSL-DMS; 4 cars per 196/1 unit: DMSL-MS-MSL-DMS
- Fleet numbers: 196001–196012; 196101–196114
- Capacity: 196/0: 141 seats; 196/1: 311 seats
- Owners: Current: Porterbrook; Former: Corelink Rail
- Operators: Current: West Midlands Railway; Future: Chiltern Railways
- Depots: Current: Tyseley (Birmingham); Future: Bletchley (Milton Keynes)
- Lines served: Current: Birmingham New Street to Shrewsbury; Birmingham New Street to Hereford; Nuneaton to Leamington Spa; Birmingham New Street to Kings Norton

Specifications
- Doors: Double-leaf sliding plug; (2 per side per car)
- Maximum speed: 100 mph (160 km/h)
- Prime movers: 2 or 4 × MTU 6H 1800 R85L; (one per car)
- Engine type: Inline-6 turbo-diesel
- Displacement: 12.8 L (780 cu in) per engine
- Power output: 196/0: 780 kW (1,050 hp); 196/1: 1,560 kW (2,090 hp); (390 kW (520 hp) per engine)
- Safety systems: AWS; TPWS
- Coupling system: Dellner
- Multiple working: Within class (max. 8 cars) (Note: In passenger service, up to four units may work together so long as the train contains no more than eight vehicles. When out of service, the maximum number of units remains four but the maximum permissible length increases to ten vehicles.)
- Track gauge: 1,435 mm (4 ft 8 1/2 in) standard gauge

The British Rail Class 196 Civity is a class of diesel multiple unit built for West Midlands Trains by Spanish rolling stock manufacturer CAF. A total of 26 units have been built; 12 two-car units and 14 four-car units.

They are the first train of the Civity family to feature end gangways.

== History ==
Shortly after the announcement that a consortium of Abellio, Mitsui and JR East had been awarded the West Midlands franchise, West Midlands Trains confirmed they had placed an order for 26 diesel multiple units based on CAF's Civity platform.

The first completed unit started testing at the Velim railway test circuit in December 2019.

The first vehicle arrived at Tyseley TMD in Birmingham on 17 April 2020, having travelled by ship from Cuxhaven to Hull. Revenue services using the new fleet began on 17 October 2022, on services between Shrewsbury and Birmingham.

== Operators ==
=== West Midlands Trains ===
West Midlands Trains use the Class 196 fleet to replace their 23 Class 170/5 Turbostar units on services between Birmingham and Shrewsbury via Telford. They also run on Birmingham to Hereford services from 2023, the Leamington-Nuneaton line. and have occasional appearances on the Snow Hill Lines (Dorridge & Stratford-upon-Avon to Worcester). Since 2026, they also run the Camp Hill line.

=== Chiltern Railways ===
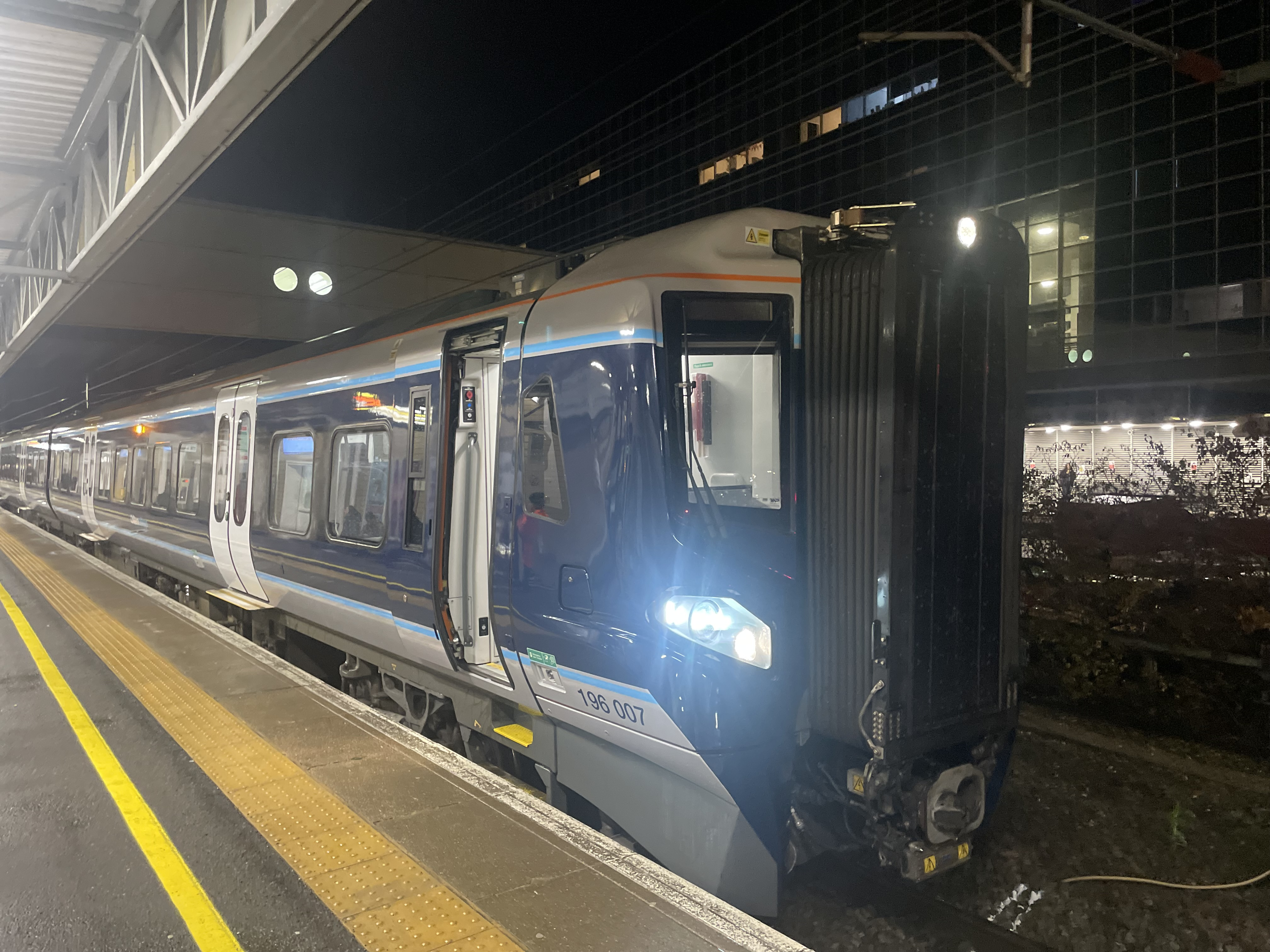
Chiltern Railways Class 196 at Milton Keynes Central

Six 2-car units will be allocated to the initial services operated on the East West Rail route between Oxford and Milton Keynes. The service was planned to start in 2025 but has since been delayed.

== Fleet details ==
Class	Operator	Qty.	Year built	Cars per unit	Unit nos.
196/0	West Midlands Trains	12	2019–2022	2	196001–196012
196/1	West Midlands Trains	14	2019–2022	4	196101–196114

=== Named units ===
Some units have received names:

- 196001: Graiseley Wolves
- 196002: Jess Carter
- 196004: Sir Edward Elgar
- 196101: Charles Darwin
- 196102: The Shropshire Flyer

== See also ==
- British Rail Class 195 - A diesel multiple unit variant of the CAF Civity UK platform built for Northern.
- British Rail Class 197 - A diesel multiple unit variant of the CAF Civity UK platform built for Transport for Wales Rail.
- British Rail Class 331 - An electric multiple unit variant of the CAF Civity UK platform built for Northern.
- British Rail Class 397 - An electric multiple unit variant of the CAF Civity UK platform built for TransPennine Express.
- British Rail Class 897 - A tri-mode multiple unit variant of the CAF Civity UK platform to be built for London North Eastern Railway.
