= British Rail Class 195 =

British diesel multiple-unit (DMU) train built by CAF

British Rail Class 195 Civity
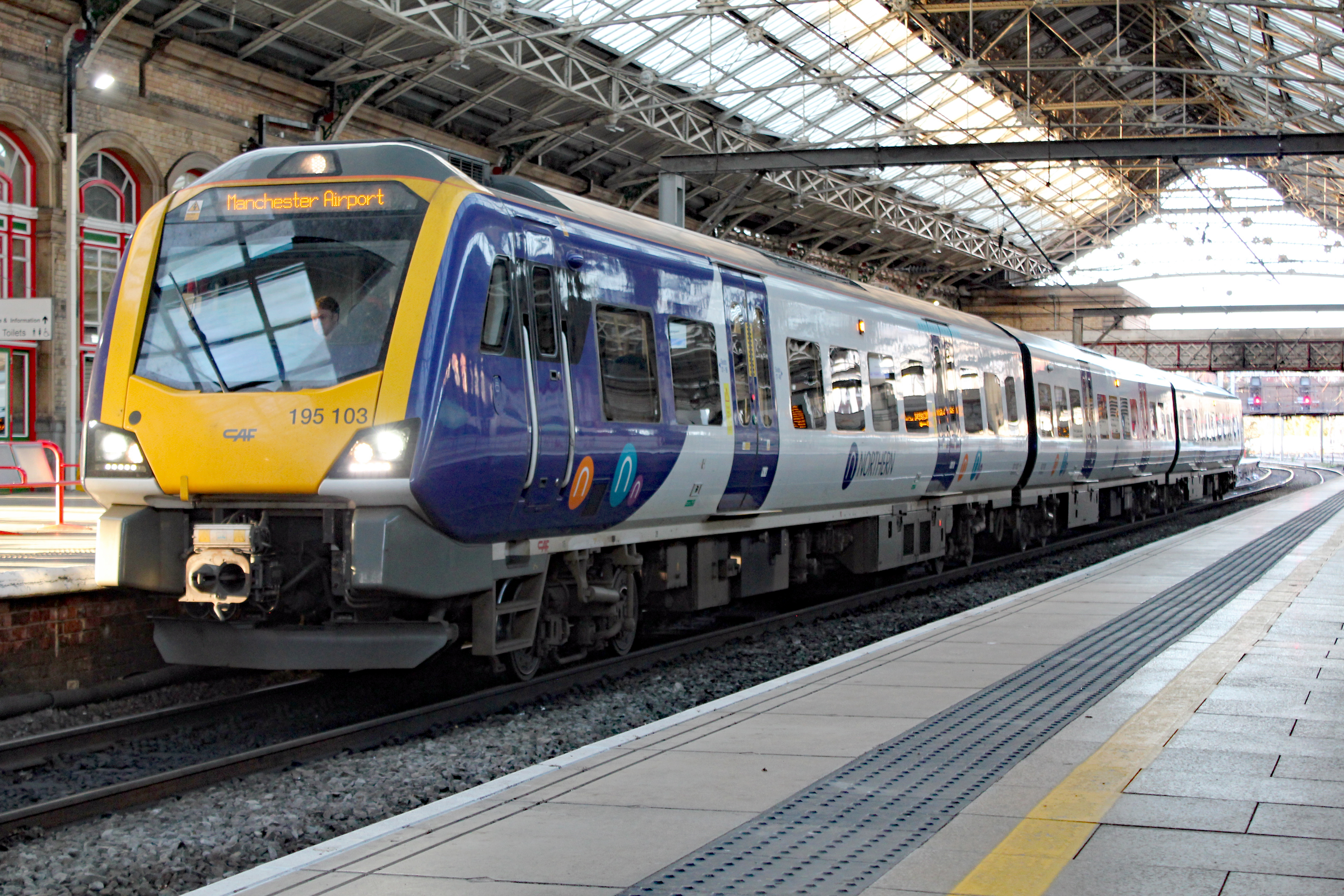
- A Northern Class 195 at Preston in 2023

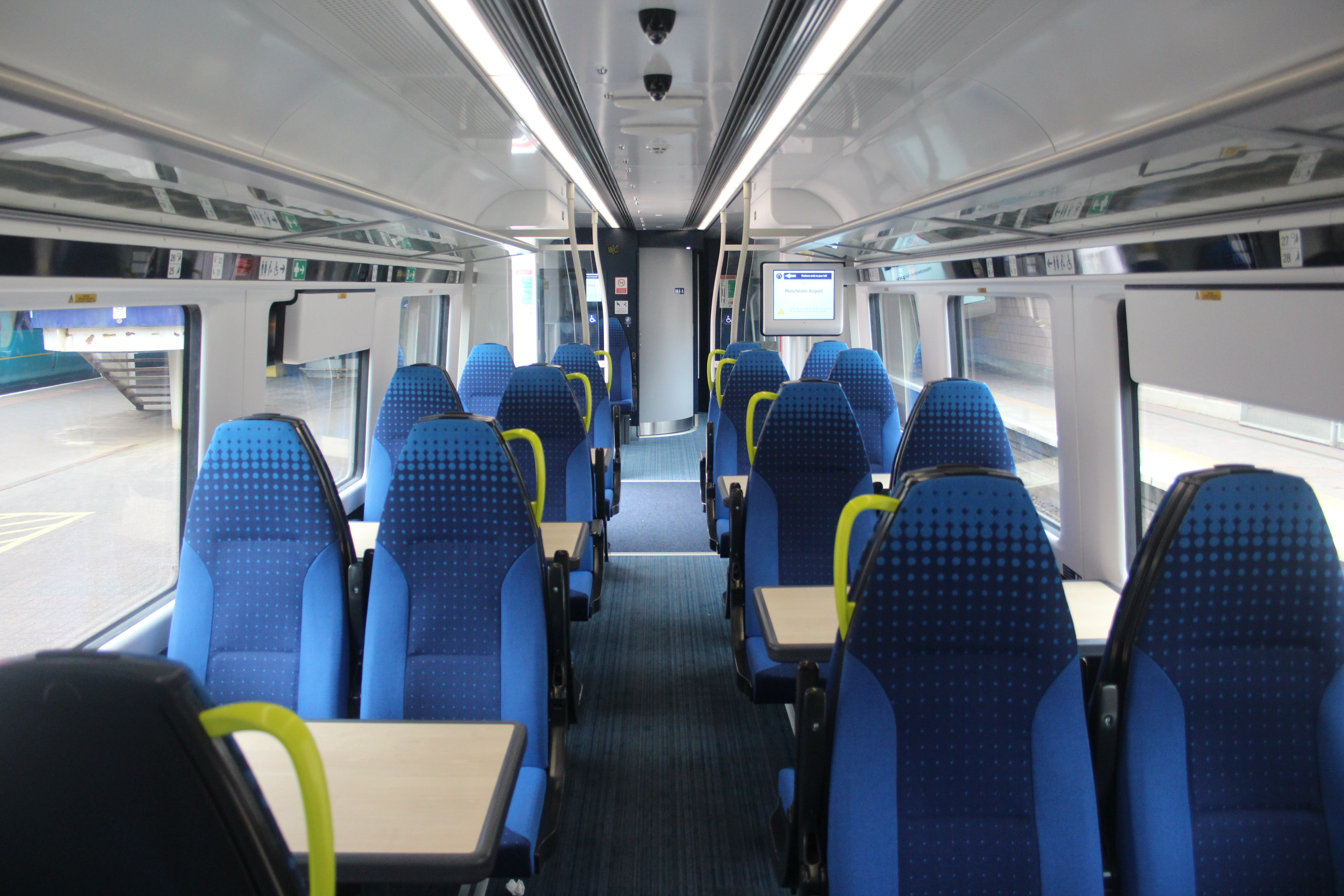
- Interior of a Class 195 unit
- In service: 1 July 2019 – present
- Manufacturer: CAF
- Built at: Irun, Spain; Newport, Wales
- Family name: Civity
- Replaced: Class 142; Class 144; Class 156
- Constructed: 2017–2020
- Number built: 58; (25 × 195/0, 33 × 195/1)
- Formation: 2 cars per 195/0 unit: DMSL-DMS; 3 cars per 195/1 unit: DMSL-MS-DMS
- Fleet numbers: 195/0: 195001–195025; 195/1: 195101–195133
- Capacity: 195/0: 124 seats; 195/1: 204 seats
- Owner: Eversholt Rail Group
- Operator: Northern Trains
- Depots: Allerton (Liverpool); Newton Heath (Manchester)

Specifications
- Train length: 195/0: 48.05 m (157 ft 8 in); 195/1: 71.40 m (234 ft 3 in)
- Car length: DMS vehs.: 24.026 m (78 ft 9.9 in); MS vehs.: 23.350 m (76 ft 7.3 in)
- Width: 2.712 m (8 ft 10.8 in)
- Height: 3.850 m (12 ft 7.6 in)
- Doors: Double-leaf sliding plug (2 per side per car)
- Wheelbase: Bogies: 2.250 m (7 ft 5 in); Over bogie centres: 16.000 m (52 ft 6 in)
- Maximum speed: 100 mph (160 km/h)
- Axle load: DMSL: 10.91 t (10.74 long tons); MS: 10.24 t (10.08 long tons); DMS: 10.94 t (10.77 long tons); (tare)
- Prime movers: 2 or 3 × MTU 6H 1800 R85L; (one per car)
- Engine type: Inline-6 turbo-diesel with SCR
- Displacement: 12.8 L (780 cu in) per engine
- Power output: 195/0: 780 kW (1,050 hp); 195/1: 1,170 kW (1,570 hp); (390 kW (520 hp) per engine)
- Transmission: ZF EcoLife 6-speed
- Acceleration: 0.83 m/s^{2} (1.9 mph/s) max.
- Safety systems: AWS; TPWS; (plus provision for ETCS)
- Coupling system: Dellner
- Multiple working: Within class (max. 12 cars)
- Track gauge: 1,435 mm (4 ft 8 1/2 in) standard gauge

The British Rail Class 195 is a class of diesel multiple-unit passenger train from the Civity family manufactured by CAF, owned by Eversholt Rail Group and currently operated by Northern Trains. A total of 58 units have been built; 25 two-car units and 33 three-car units. The class is almost identical to the Class 331 also produced by CAF, which is the electric version of the Class 195, differing only in traction type and (in some units) vehicle formation.

They were first introduced on 1 July 2019, entering service with the previous operator Arriva Rail North on the Manchester Airport and Liverpool Lime Street via Warrington, and Manchester Airport to Barrow-in-Furness routes. The final 195 unit entered service in December 2020, and all 58 units work across some non-electrified routes across the Northern network.

== History ==
The introduction of new rolling stock for the Northern franchise was fuelled by the need to phase out the unpopular Pacer trains by 2020. The tender for the then-new franchise in 2015 originally permitted the continued use of Pacer trains, as it was judged by the Department for Transport (DfT) that a new rolling-stock order represented "poor value for money". However the House of Commons Transport Select Committee described the continued use of Pacer trains as "unacceptable" and recommended that the Secretary of State use franchise specification power to include the need for a new rolling-stock order. Subsequently, the then Secretary of State for Transport Patrick McLoughlin issued a ministerial direction in February 2015 to force the new franchise to include a new rolling-stock order as part of the franchise agreement, which would enable the Pacer trains to be phased out.

The announcement of the new trains was made by now-previous operator Arriva UK Trains when it was confirmed that it would become the next operator of the Northern franchise (after Serco-Abellio) from 1 April 2016. The Class 195 order was based on Arriva's belief that the ageing and dilapidated state of rolling stock in Northern England was an inherent obstacle to enticing new passengers – particularly motorists – and that investing in new modern trains represented the best long-term strategy for enabling passenger growth.

CAF was selected by Arriva, as it was the only manufacturer able to build both diesel and electric (Class 331) multiple units from the same platform, Civity, thus increasing familiarity for drivers and reducing maintenance costs once in operation. Bombardier made a bid to produce electric Aventra units but was unable to offer a sister diesel unit which Arriva required. Furthermore, Bombardier already had a long order book for Aventra units and Arriva believed that CAF was in a stronger position to guarantee on-time delivery of the units.

Construction of the bodyshells began in Zaragoza in July 2017. The wheelsets were constructed in Beasain and final assembly of the units took place in Irun. The first completed Class 195 unit began undergoing tests at the Velim test track in May 2018. The first unit arrived in England in June 2018 and testing on the main line began in September 2018.

== Description ==
Arriva UK Trains stated its aim for a "step-change in quality" for the new trains when compared with older trains in the Northern fleet such as the Pacers and Sprinters. The interior, layout and driver cab of the Class 195 (DMU) are similar to their sister units, the Class 331 (EMU), the differences being in power generation and drivetrain.

The 195s have a 'doors-at-thirds' arrangement, and a top speed limited to 100 mph (161 km/h). They have air conditioning, power sockets, one toilet per train, open gangways between individual carriages, passenger compartment CCTV, provision for wheelchair passengers, and a Wi-Fi system. All trains are fitted with an automated audio information system, as well as display screens - six in each carriage, ensuring all passengers have an unobstructed view of at least one. These screens convey a variety of information, including station arrival times and informing alighting passengers when they need to be in a different carriage due to platforms being too short to accommodate the train.

Northern selected a "wide and spacious" vestibule area to allow for quicker passenger flows when boarding and disembarking to minimise dwell times and thus reduce delays. The large spaces around the doors create a flexible space, with flip-down seats for quiet times of day, and standing space in times of overcrowding where the objective is to ensure that all passengers can board. Since the units are not fitted with fixed luggage racks (as these often reduce capacity on peak-time commuter trains) the space by the doors can also be used to store luggage and prams - thus not impacting on the capacity of the train or safety of passengers wishing to alight or board. In maintaining an objective for the interior to be spacious, seats are cantilevered off the body frame and there are no internal doors, with open gangways between carriages.

The units were designed with a projected lifespan of 35 years and it was planned they will operate beyond 2050 with maintenance and refurbishment. A feature is a digital seat reservation system, however this is to future-proof the train and Northern did not envisage using it on many, if any routes. Although the vast majority of services operate as three- or four-car formations (two-car units doubled), some three-car units will be doubled up to form six-car services, such as the route between Manchester Oxford Road and Liverpool via Warrington Central. As a result, they are fitted with Automatic Selective Door Operation (ASDO) for use on routes where station platform lengths are not sufficient to fully accommodate the train. This ASDO system is linked to an automated system which informs the passengers through both audio announcements and the passenger information screens in each saloon.

== Operators ==
=== Northern Trains ===
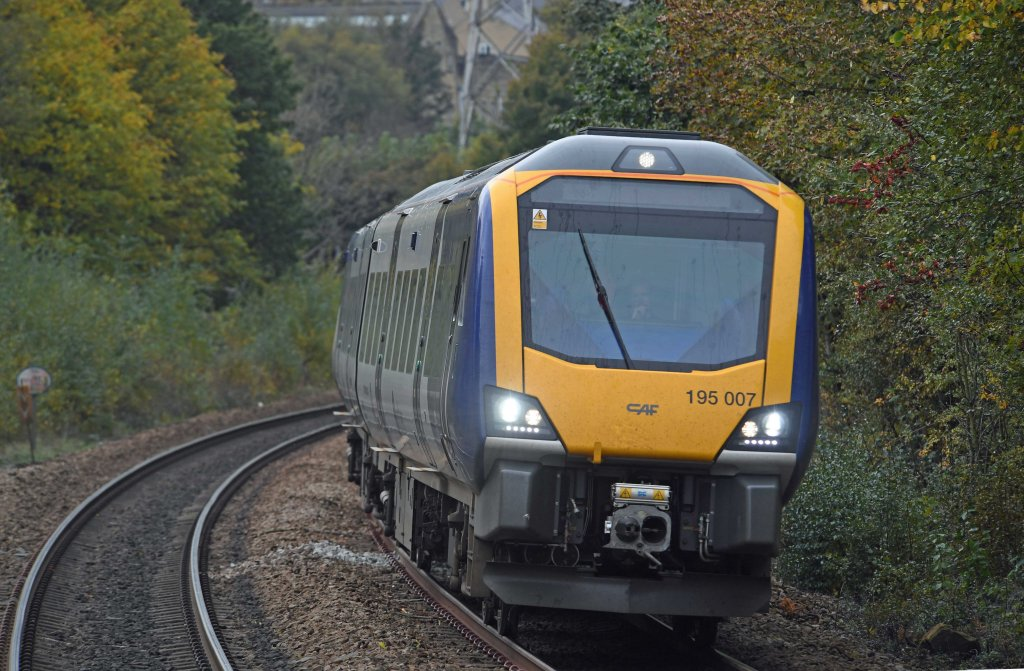
Northern Rail Class 195 on a test run near Manchester

On 1 March 2020 the Northern franchise was taken over by government-owned Northern Trains. All Class 195 units transferred to Northern Trains on 1 March 2020 along with the rest of the Northern fleet.

== Named units ==
- 195002 – Super League 30 Sustainable Transport Partner
- 195104 – Deva Victrix
- 195107 - Rob Burrow CBE
- 195109 – Pride of Cumbria
- 195111 – Key Worker
- 195116 – Proud To Be Northern
- 195126 – Peak District 75
- 195128 – Calder Champion

== Fleet details ==
Originally, 25 two-car and 30 three-car units were ordered; in November 2018 it was announced that an order of additional 3 three-car units had been placed. A tender notice for a further 20 multiple units was published in December 2021.

Class	Operator	Number	Year built	Cars	Unit nos.
195/0	Northern Trains	25	2017-2020	2	195001–195025
195/1	Northern Trains	33	2017-2020	3	195101–195133

== Accidents and incidents ==
- On 22 March 2024, a train formed of Class 195 units 195 104 and 195 133 was derailed near Grange-over-Sands station when it travelled over defective track at 56 miles per hour (90 km/h). There were no injuries amongst the eight people on board. The Rail Accident Investigation Branch opened an investigation.

== See also ==
- British Rail Class 196 - A diesel multiple unit variant of the CAF Civity UK platform built for West Midlands Trains
- British Rail Class 197 - A diesel multiple unit variant of the CAF Civity UK platform built for Transport for Wales Rail
- British Rail Class 331 - An electric multiple unit variant of the CAF Civity UK platform also built for Northern
- British Rail Class 397 - An electric multiple unit variant of the CAF Civity UK platform built for TransPennine Express
- British Rail Class 897 - A tri-mode multiple unit variant of the CAF Civity UK platform to be built for London North Eastern Railway
