= Chester TMD =

Railway maintenance depot in Chester, Cheshire

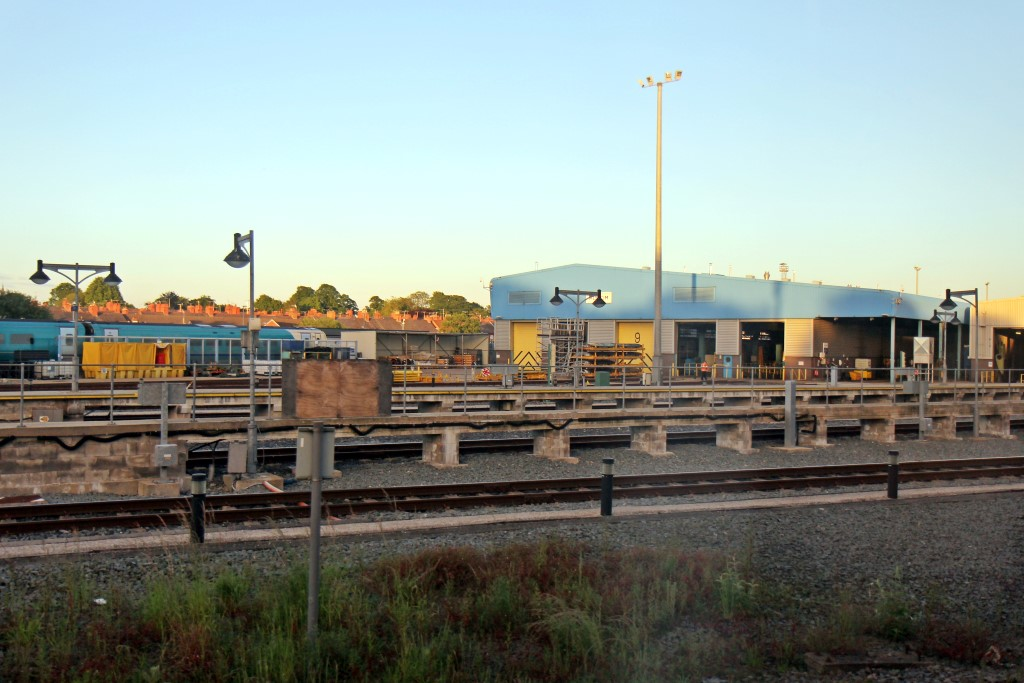
- Alstom Traincare Centre, Chester
- Interactive map of Chester TMD

Location
- Location: Chester, England
- Coordinates: 53.1992°N 2.8845°W
- OS grid: SJ409673

Characteristics
- Owner: Transport for Wales Rail
- Operator: CAF
- Depot code: CH (1973-)
- Type: DMU

History
- BR region: London Midland Region
- Former depot code: 6A (1948-1973)

Chester TMD is a traction maintenance depot located in Chester, Cheshire, England. The depot is situated to the north of Chester railway station, and is located adjacent to the Wirral Line. The depot is currently used as CAF's Chester Traincare Centre, having transferred from Alstom in June 2022.

== History ==
In 1987 the depot had an allocation of Class 08s and DMUs, and was a stabling point for Class 31s and Class 47s. The DMUs allocated included Classes 100, 101, 108, 116 and 120.

== Allocation ==
As of 2026, the depot's allocation consists of Transport for Wales Class 197s.
