= NS DDNG =

Dutch Railways electric multiple unit

Dubbeldekker Nieuwe Generatie (DDNG)
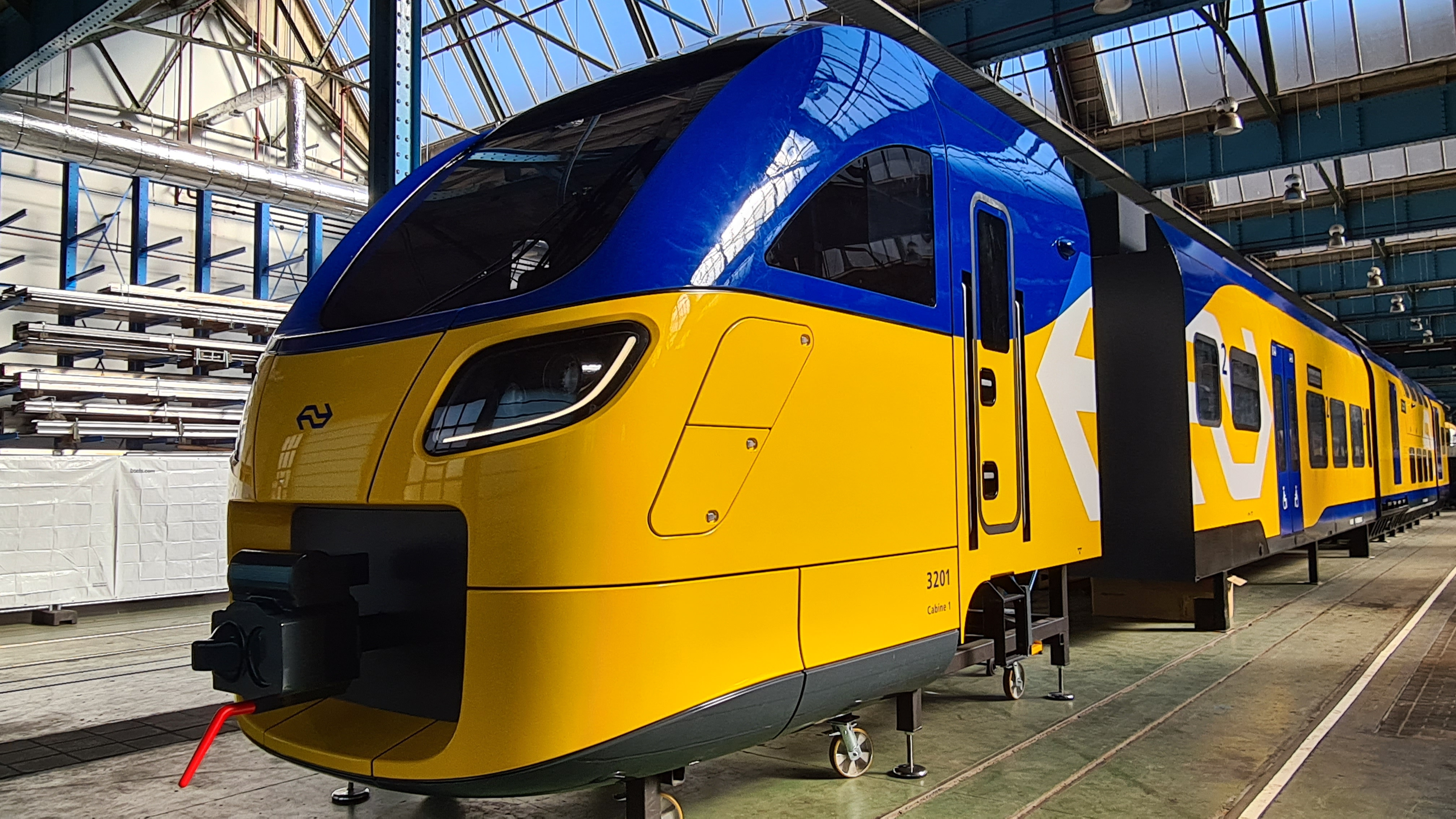
- A mock-up of the DDNG in March 2025
- Stock type: Electric multiple unit
- In service: 2029 (projected)
- Manufacturer: CAF
- Family name: Civity Duo
- Number under construction: 300 carriages (30 4-car sets and 30 6-car sets)
- Formation: Mc–T–T–Mc; Mc–T–T–T–T–Mc
- Operator: NS Reizigers

Specifications
- Train length: 108.1 m (355 ft) (4-car sets); 160.3 m (526 ft) (6-car sets)
- Car length: 27.95 m (91.7 ft) (Mc); 26.1 m (86 ft) (T)
- Maximum speed: 160 km/h (99 mph)
- Electric systems: 1,500 V DC
- Safety systems: ATB-EG, ERTMS/ETCS
- Coupling system: Scharfenberg
- Track gauge: 1,435 mm (4 ft 8 1/2 in) standard gauge

The Dubbeldekker Nieuwe Generatie (transl. Double-Decker New Generation), or DDNG, is an electric multiple unit trainset of the Dutch Railways. The trainsets will supplement the existing intercity rolling stock and replace the NS DDZ when they are expected to enter service in 2029. The trainsets are of the CAF Civity Duo family, which is the same family of trains used for the single-deck NS Sprinter Nieuwe Generatie (transl. Sprinter New Generation).

== History ==
Since 2020, the Dutch Railway operates 3 types of intercity rolling stock: NS ICM, NS VIRM, and NS DDZ, of which the NS ICM and NS DDZ are nearing the end of their service life.

Between 2004 and 2013, the number of passengers on the main rail grew by 24% which can be attributed to a growth in population, a larger number of students, increased fuel prices and additional train services. To meet the growth in demand the Dutch Railway opted to use double-decker rolling stock for their new intercity trains.

=== Tender ===
On 9 April 2020, the Dutch Railways issued a tender for a double-decker intercity train which also included some single-deck coaches for accessibility.

In August 2022, it was announced that CAF won the tender with the Civity Duo family. The contract included 60 double-decker trainsets: 30 four-car sets and 30 six-car sets with a total of 30,000 seats. The Dutch Railways invested approximately 600 million euros in the new trains. The contract has an option for additional orders including ones that can travel across the Dutch border.

== Description ==
The base order consists of 30 four-car sets and 30 six-car sets, each with a single-deck carriage at either end with level entry. The trains are equipped with ATB-EG and ERTMS and run on 1,500 V DC with an option for 3,000 V DC. These trains are not suitable for the HSL-Zuid.

=== Interior ===
At Dutch Design Week in October 2018, the Dutch Railways presented a vision for trains, which are divided into zones. This caters towards those using the train as a meeting space or office. The guidelines were formalized in 2020 and will be adopted by the DDNG trains.

On 5 March 2025, the Dutch Railways presented the new interior designs and a physical mock-up of the train. This included two new seating formations; a bar table facing the window with two seats for laptop users and a raised table with four seats. First-class seats will be in a 2+2 seating arrangement, unlike the usual 2+1 used on other NS intercity trains, to maximize capacity. Almost every seat will include a USB-C charging socket.

Wood patterns will also be on the ceiling for a warm and pleasant look. Art placed on the walls and doors is done by designer Marieke van Diemen. At the entrances of the trains passenger information displays will be placed.

=== Exterior ===
The 'Flow' livery will be used on the exterior of the DDNG with indicators at doors for strollers and large luggage. The inside of doorways and the exterior of carriages will indicate if the seating is first or second class.

=== Sustainability ===
A material passport will be used to identify the origins of material used and track recyclability rates of components when decommissioning. An effort is also made to reduce the weight of the DDNG trains so less build material is required, and the train also consumes less energy during operation.

== Maintenance ==
Maintenance of the DDNG rolling stock will be done by NedTrains Onnen.
