= British Rail Class 197 =

British diesel multiple-unit (DMU) train built by CAF

British Rail Class 197 Civity
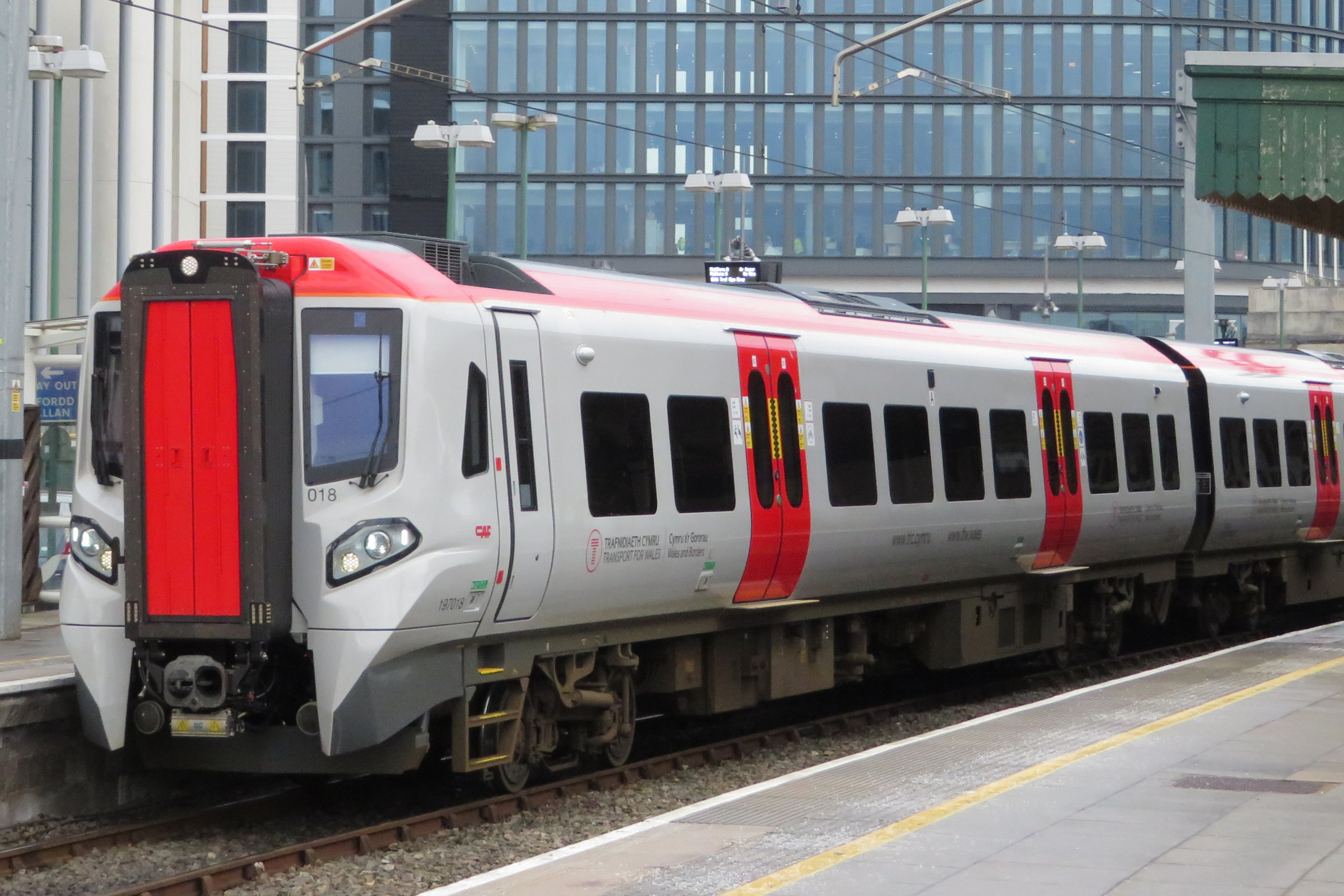
- Class 197 at Cardiff Central in 2023

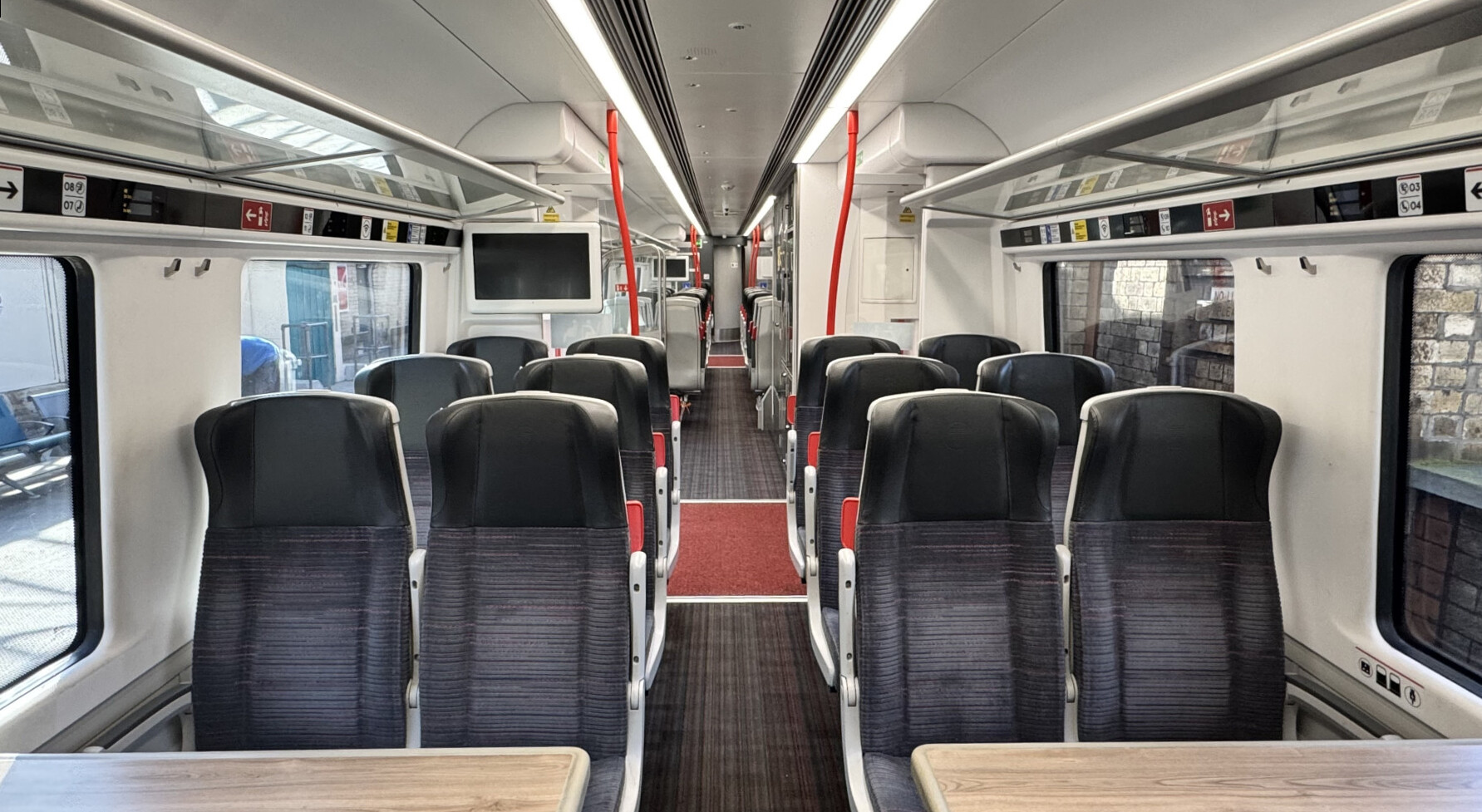
- Class 197 standard class interior
- In service: 14 November 2022 – present (see Phased introduction)
- Manufacturer: CAF
- Built at: Newport, South Wales (body shells imported from Spain)
- Family name: Civity
- Replaced: Class 150; Class 158; Class 175
- Constructed: 2020–2026
- Number built: 77
- Formation: 2 or 3 cars per unit (See § Variants)
- Capacity: 2-car: 116 seats; 3-car 2+2-only: 188 seats; 3-car with 2+1: 174 seats (158 2+2, 16 2+1)
- Owners: SMBC Leasing and Equitix
- Operator: Transport for Wales Rail
- Depots: Current: Canton (Cardiff); Chester; Future: Machynlleth

Specifications
- Train length: 2-car: 48.05 m (157 ft 8 in); 3-car: 71.40 m (234 ft 3 in)
- Car length: DM cars: 24.03 m (78 ft 10 in); MSL cars: 23.35 m (76 ft 7 in)
- Doors: Double-leaf sliding plug (2 per side per car)
- Maximum speed: 100 mph (160 km/h)
- Prime movers: MTU 6H 1800 R85L (1 per car)
- Engine type: Turbo-diesel
- Cylinder count: 6 (inline) per engine
- Displacement: 12.8 L (780 cu in) per engine
- Power output: 375 kW (503 hp) per engine; 2-car: 750 kW (1,010 hp); 3-car: 1,125 kW (1,509 hp)
- Transmission: ZF EcoLife hydromechanical (Note: Combines a mechanical gearbox with a torque converter and hydraulic retarder.)
- Braking systems: Electro-pneumatic (disc) (Knorr-Bremse EP2002)
- Safety systems: AWS; ETCS (21 197/0s only); TPWS
- Coupling system: Dellner
- Multiple working: Within class
- Track gauge: 1,435 mm (4 ft 8 1/2 in) standard gauge

The British Rail Class 197 is a class of diesel multiple unit passenger train built by CAF, based on its Civity platform. They are operated by Transport for Wales Rail (TfW), comprising 51 two-car and 26 three-car units.

Seventy-seven Class 197 sets were ordered in 2018 under the franchise obligations made by KeolisAmey Wales, the then-operator of the Wales & Borders franchise. They are based on the Class 195 units that were being received by Arriva Rail North at that time, albeit with various customisations to suit the specification and preferences of KeolisAmey and TfW. This specification was refined to include additional comfort features and address public concerns. Testing of the type commenced shortly after the first completed train arrived at Crewe for commissioning in April 2021.

The first Class 197 set entered service in November 2022 and the type was officially launched two months later. It is planned for the Class 197 to eventually replace Class 158 trains on various regional and regional express routes that form part of the Wales & Borders rail franchise, such as the Cambrian lines. They are also expected to replace Class 150 and 153 units on the Conwy Valley line, and to allow extension of services between Liverpool Lime Street and Chester into both north and south Wales. In February 2024, they were cleared to run on the Maesteg Line and entered service on the Ebbw Valley Line on 29 April 2024.

== History ==
=== Background ===
Operator KeolisAmey Wales took over the Wales & Borders franchise from Arriva Trains Wales in October 2018. As part of their franchise award, KeolisAmey were required to fully replace the various fleets of trains used to operate the franchise, several of which had originally been inherited from British Rail. Orders were placed with a number of manufacturers for new units, including one for 77 new Civity-family DMUs from Spanish firm Construcciones y Auxiliar de Ferrocarriles (CAF). These were based on the Class 195 units that CAF had started delivering to Arriva Rail North earlier in 2018, and were also assembled at CAF's new factory in Newport. Entry into service was expected between 2021 and 2023. Unlike Class 195 units, however, the TfW-ordered DMUs have gangway connections at their ends, making them look very similar to the Class 196 units operated by West Midlands Trains. The design allows passengers and crew to move freely between coupled units.

=== Specification concerns ===
In January 2020, WalesOnline reported that, based on minutes from Transport for Wales board meetings, the organisation had "raised concerns" that the seats specified by KeolisAmey and CAF for the Class 197 order could be considered uncomfortable by passengers. The same seat model is used on the Class 700 trains serving Thameslink services in and around London, where some passengers—particularly those making longer journeys—have described them as "ironing boards". TfW argued that these would be "unsuitable for long-distance journeys", some of which last well over four hours, but noted that it did not have a "strong legal argument" to compel KeolisAmey and CAF to change the specification. TfW eventually paid an additional £1.9 million to upgrade to higher-specification Fainsa Sophia seats, although these seats have themselves been the subject of some criticism from passengers of Great Western Railway trains to which they are also fitted.

Separately, a passenger advocacy group challenged the fact that TfW had specified only one toilet for each two-car Class 197 unit and two for each three-car unit; a reduction from the one-toilet-per-car configuration on TfW's existing long-distance Class 158 and 175 trains. The group also noted that the Rail Delivery Group's industry guideline for inter-urban trains throughout the UK states that there should be at least one toilet per 85 passengers, and a minimum of two toilets per train regardless of passenger capacity; but that two-car 197s would satisfy neither of these recommendations and that three-car 197s could exceed the 85-passengers-per-toilet ratio when near to fully loaded. TfW stated in response that many services would be operated by two-car Class 197s working as pairs, reducing the number of potential single-toilet services.

=== Entry to service ===
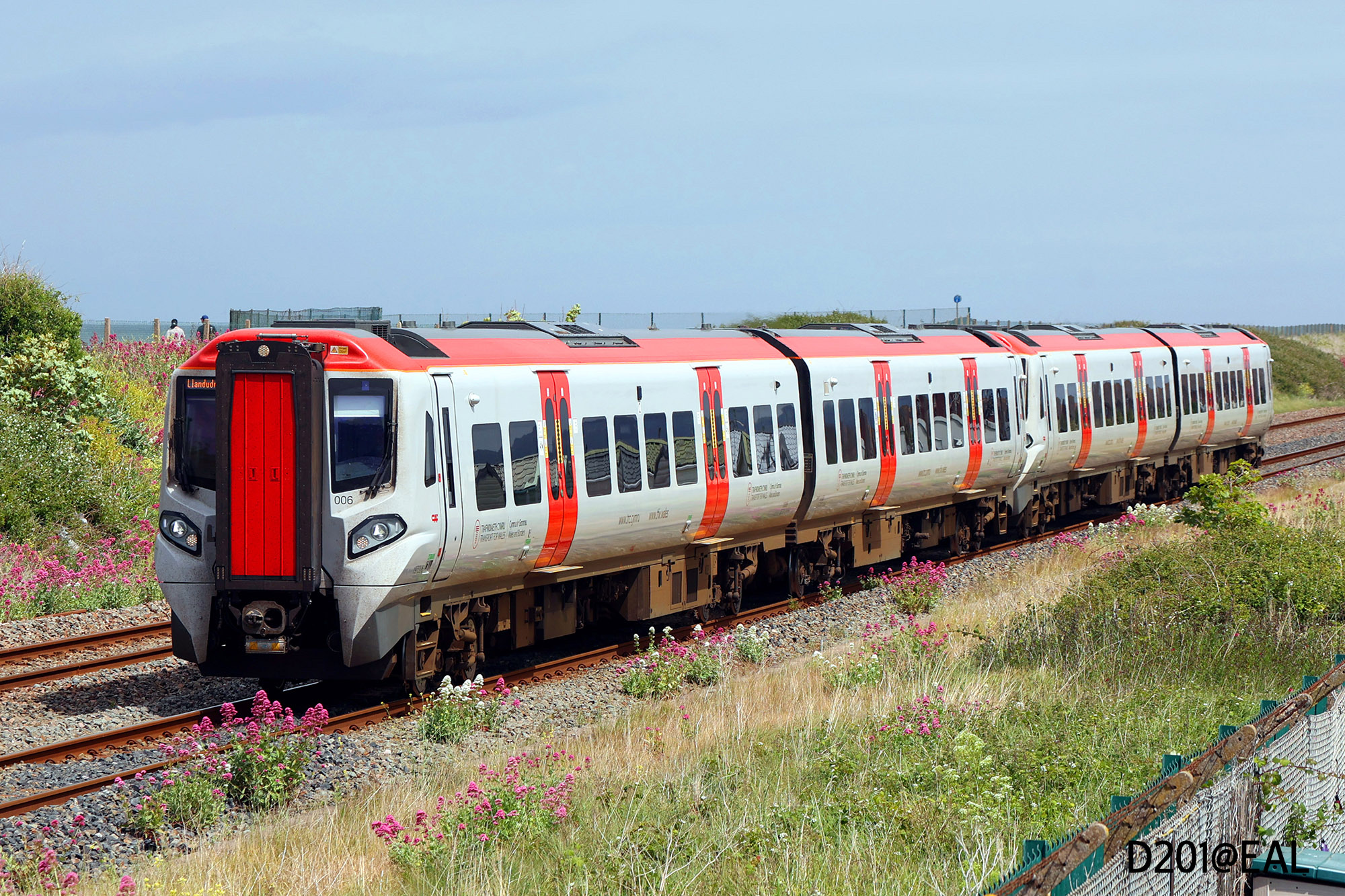
A four-car train formed of two Class 197/0 two-car units in the Abergele area in 2025

During December 2019, the Class 197 designation was assigned and, on 14 April 2021, the first completed train—a two-car unit numbered 197001—arrived at Crewe for commissioning. Testing of the type commenced soon thereafter. On 18 January 2022, the Office of Rail and Road (ORR) granted authorisation for 20 two-car and 12 three-car Class 197 sets to enter passenger use; these initial units were not equipped to use the European Train Control System (ETCS).

Unit 197004 was the first to enter passenger service, doing so on 14 November 2022. That same month, the ORR authorised 21 Class 197 units fitted with CAF Signalling’s onboard ETCS at Baseline 3 Release 2 and GSM-R Baseline 1 for operation in ETCS Level 2 and below under recently-introduced regulations. During January 2023, the Class 197 was officially launched at a ceremony officiated by Minister for North Wales Lesley Griffiths and held at Llandudno railway station.

=== Phased introduction ===
==== 2022 ====
The fleet's introduction was phased. During late 2022, the Class 197 was initially used only on the Conwy Valley line in a part of North Wales.

==== 2023 ====
By February 2023, the Class 197 was introduced on services between Manchester Airport in North-West England and Llandudno in North Wales and on services between Liverpool Lime Street and Chester, both in North-West England, as well as on North Wales Main Line services.

By late 2023, the Class 197 had been introduced on services between Manchester Piccadilly in North-West England and Swansea in West Wales, via the Welsh Marches line.

By November 2023, the Class 197 had been introduced in service between Swansea and Carmarthen in West Wales.

In November 2023, the Class 197 started working between Wrexham and Bidston on the North Wales/North-West England Borderlands line, alongside the Class 230s, due to unreliability of the Class 230s.

In December 2023, the Class 197 began operating services to Fishguard Harbour and Milford Haven, their previous limit in West Wales having been Carmarthen.

==== 2024 ====
In April 2024, the Class 197 entered service on the Ebbw Valley Railway, the Maesteg Line and services between Cardiff and Cheltenham Spa, including the subsequent different working of these services from December 2024, though this is only temporary until they are replaced by the Class 231s, which will be made available when the Class 756s replace the Class 231 units on the main South Wales Valleys network.

In June 2024, the Class 197 began operating on services to Pembroke Dock in West Wales.

==== 2025 ====
In February 2025, the Class 197 started working between Shrewsbury and Birmingham International in the West Midlands of England, on services between Holyhead in North Wales and Birmingham, as well as between Shrewsbury and Birmingham as part of Cambrian Line services between Aberystwyth in Mid-West Wales / Aberystwyth & Pwllheli in North Wales and Birmingham (until the Class 197 units enter service on the Cambrian Line itself - see Future plans - a change of train between Class 158 and Class 197 is made at Shrewsbury).

==== 2026 ====
In May 2026, services between Liverpool and Llandudno started; these are operated with Class 197s.

By 17 October 2026, TfW had enacted a plan for the introduction of the ETCS-fitted units on the Cambrian Coast Line (between Machynlleth in Mid Wales and Pwllheli) from 19 October 2026.

Several ETCS-fitted Class 197 units were introduced on services between Pwllheli and Machnynlleth on the Cambrian Line on October 19th 2026, accompanied with a temporary timetable; Pweheli-Shrewsbury/Birmingham International through services are suspended as the Class 197s cannot couple with the Class 158s.

==== Future plans ====
TfW plans to introduce the Class 197 across the rest of the Cambrian Line and restore normal service by the end of 2026, with the Class 197s fully replacing the 158s later on.

In September 2025, it was announced that TfW has submitted an application to the Office of Rail and Road to run Class 197-operated services between Fishguard Harbour/Milford Haven/Carmarthen and Bristol Temple Meads, via stations including Swansea, Cardiff Central, Newport, Severn Tunnel Junction, Filton Abbey Wood and Stapleton Road. In April 2026, Great Western Railway raised concerns with TfW's application, but in May 2026, TfW revised it and, if approved, these services would start in December 2026 (rather than September 2026 as originally planned).

== Fleet details ==
Subclass	Operator	Qty.	Year built	Cars	Unit nos.	Notes
197/0	Transport for Wales Rail	30	2020-2023	2	197001–197002, 197004–197021, 197042–197051	Without ETCS
197/0	Transport for Wales Rail	21	2021-2026	2	197003, 197022–197041	With ETCS
197/1	Transport for Wales Rail	12	2020-2023	3	197101–197112	2+2 seating only
197/1	Transport for Wales Rail	14	2023-2024	3	197113–197126	With a small portion of 2+1 seating

=== Variants ===
The order for the fleet is divided into four variants, as follows:

- 30 units formed of two cars (DMSL-DMS) with 2+2 standard-class seating only, without ETCS;
- 21 units formed of two cars (DMSL-DMS) with 2+2 standard-class seating only, with ETCS; (Note: European Train Control System (ETCS) equipment has been necessary for operation on the Cambrian lines since they were converted to use the European Rail Traffic Management System in late 2010.)
- 12 units formed of three cars (DMSL-MSL-DMS) with 2+2 standard-class seating only, without ETCS;
- 14 units formed of three cars (DMSL-MSL-DMC) with a small portion of 2+1 seating (intended for the abandoned Standard Plus; declassified to standard class), without ETCS. These are primarily intended for use between Swansea and Manchester.

Two-car units will be able to run in multiple with up to three other two-car units, while three-car units will be able to run in multiple with up to two other three-car units.

=== Named and notable units ===
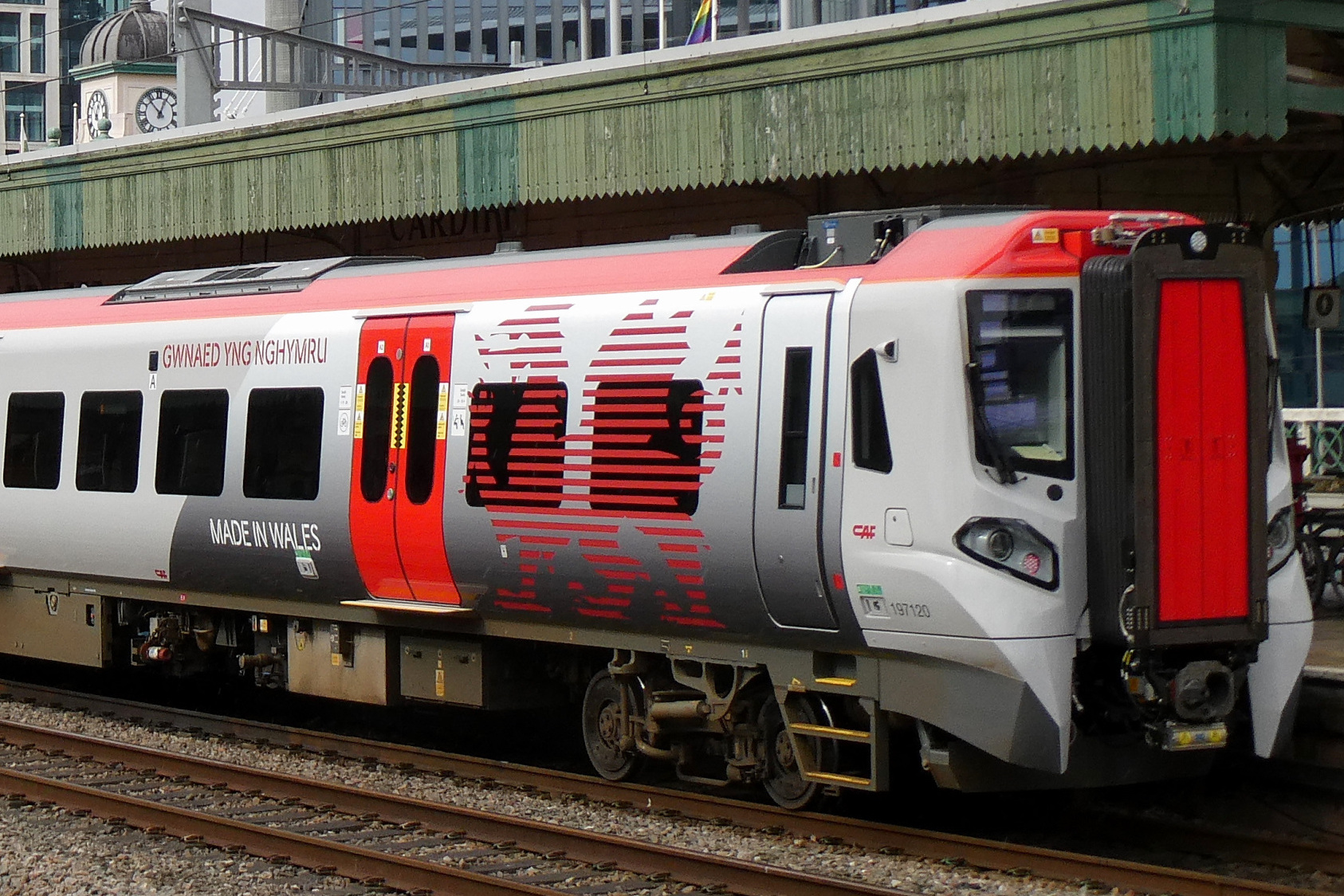
197120's 'Made in Wales' / Welsh Dragon livery at Cardiff Central in 2024

TfW organised the Magnificent Train Journey competition, aimed at primary school children, to name its Class 197 units.

- 197001: Robin Goch Philadelphia / Philadelphia Robin
- 197004: Ddraig Goch Vancouver / Vancouver Red Dragon
- 197007: Happy Valley
- 197009: Pier Penarth / Penarth Pier
- 197049: Castell Caeriw Cyflym / Carew Castle Express
- 197111: Segontiwm
- 197114: Y Porthmon
- 197118: Afanc
- 197119: Mistar Urdd
- 197123: Afon Dyfrdwy

Additionally, 197120, although not named on nameplates, carries "Gwnaed yng Nghymru / Made in Wales" livery additions with large Welsh Dragons on its DMSL and DMC vehicles that further emphasise the same text statement that is on the door sill plaques of all 197s.

== See also ==
- British Rail Class 195 - A diesel multiple unit variant of the CAF Civity UK platform built for Northern.
- British Rail Class 196 - A diesel multiple unit variant of the CAF Civity UK platform built for West Midlands Trains.
- British Rail Class 331 - An electric multiple unit variant of the CAF Civity UK platform built for Northern.
- British Rail Class 397 - An electric multiple unit variant of the CAF Civity UK platform built for TransPennine Express.
- British Rail Class 897 - A tri-mode multiple unit variant of the CAF Civity UK platform to be built for London North Eastern Railway.
