= British Rail Class 397 =

Class of electric multiple unit built by Spanish rolling stock manufacturer CAF

British Rail Class 397 Civity
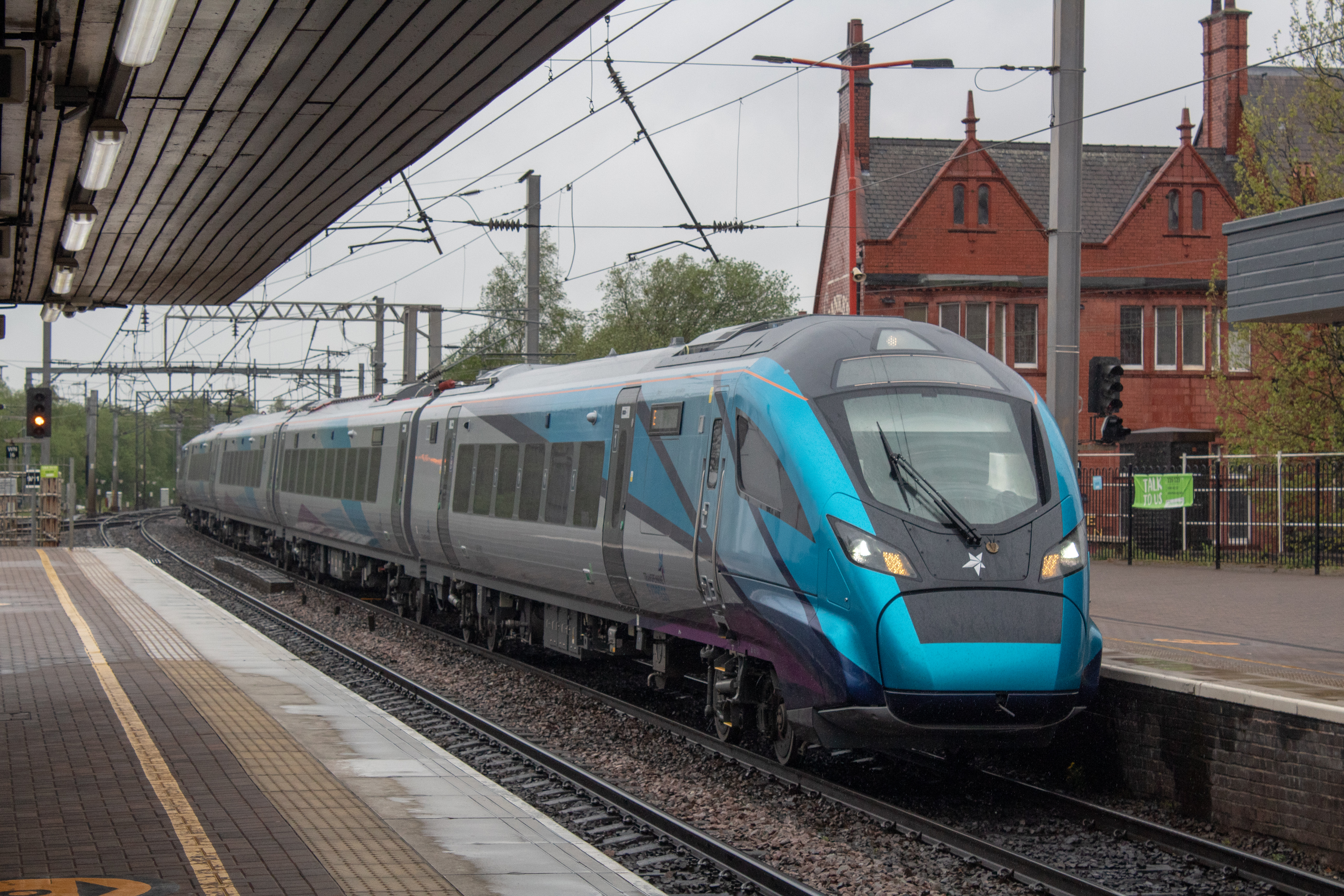
- Class 397 at Wigan North Western in 2019

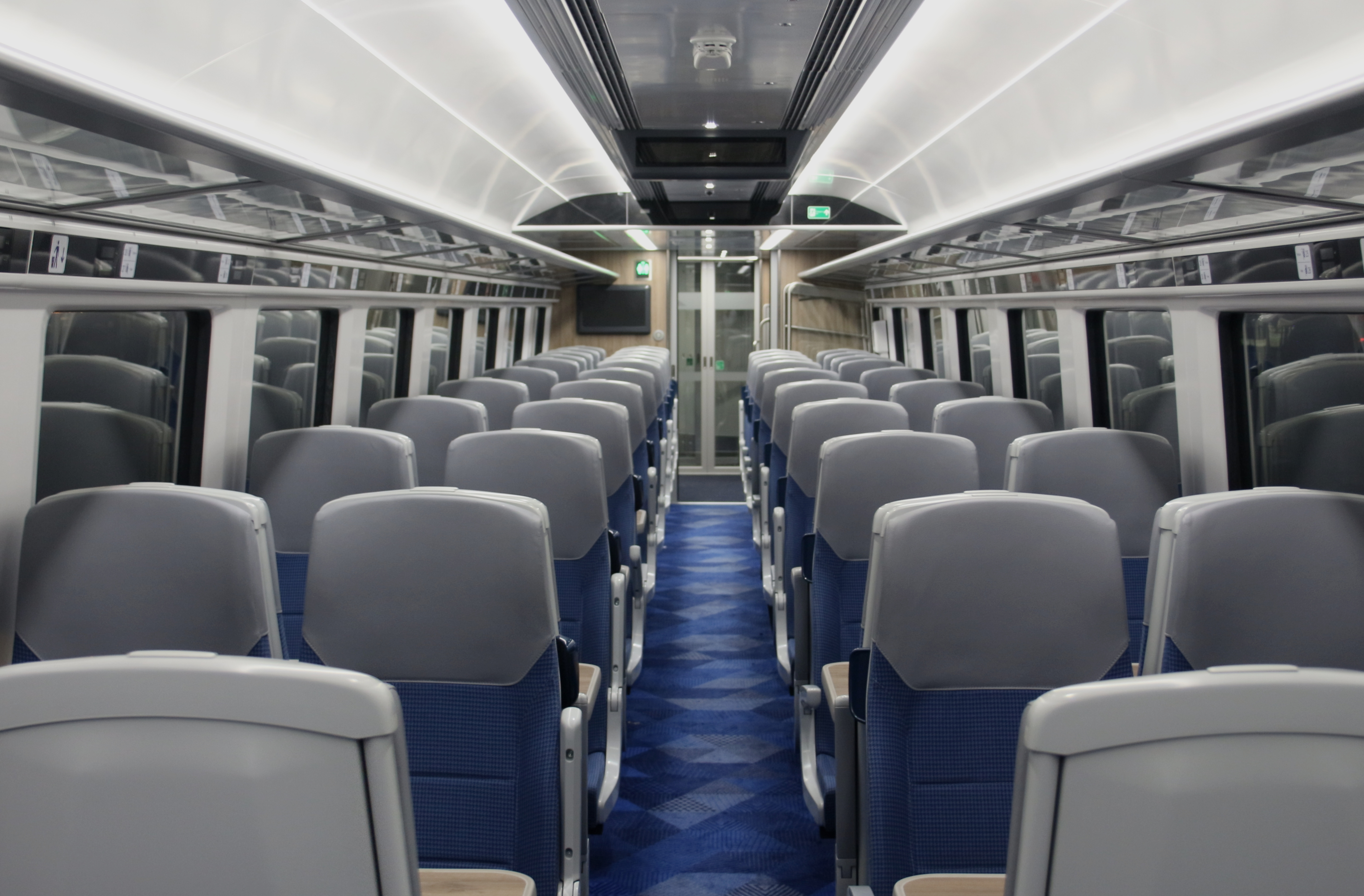
- Standard-class interior of a Class 397 unit
- Stock type: Electric multiple unit
- In service: 30 November 2019 – present
- Manufacturer: CAF
- Built at: Beasain, Spain
- Family name: Civity
- Replaced: Class 350/4
- Constructed: 2017–2019
- Number built: 12
- Number in service: 12
- Formation: 5 cars per unit: DMFLW-PTS1-MSL-PTS2-DMSL
- Fleet numbers: 397001–397012
- Capacity: 288 seats (24 first class, 264 standard)
- Owner: Eversholt Rail Group
- Operators: Current: TransPennine Express; Former: First TransPennine Express
- Depots: Longsight (Manchester); Polmadie (Glasgow)
- Line served: West Coast Main Line

Specifications
- Train length: 118 m (387 ft 2 in)
- Car length: DM vehicles: 24.026 m (78 ft 9.9 in); Intermediate vehicles: 23.35 m (76 ft 7 in)
- Doors: Single-leaf sliding plug (2 per side per car)
- Wheel diameter: 780–710 mm (31–28 in) (new-worn)
- Maximum speed: 125 mph (200 km/h)
- Traction system: CAF Power IGBT–VVVF
- Gear ratio: 4.707 : 1 (2-stage reduction)
- Acceleration: 0.92 m/s^{2} (3.0 ft/s^{2})
- Electric system: 25 kV 50 Hz AC overhead
- Current collection: Pantograph
- Braking systems: Electro-pneumatic (disc) and regenerative
- Safety systems: AWS; TPWS; (plus provision for ETCS)
- Coupling system: Dellner
- Multiple working: Within class, but not yet authorised (Note: The authorisation granted in July 2019 permitted single-unit operation only, until such time as testing of pantograph performance in trains of more than one unit confirmed compliance with the relevant Technical Specifications for Interoperability.)
- Track gauge: 1,435 mm (4 ft 8 1/2 in) standard gauge

Notes/references
- Sourced from unless otherwise noted.

The British Rail Class 397 Civity is a class of electric multiple unit built by Spanish rolling stock manufacturer CAF for lease to TransPennine Express by Eversholt Rail Group. A total of twelve five-car units were built to operate services on TransPennine North West services between Liverpool Lime Street/Manchester Airport and Edinburgh Waverley/Glasgow Central.

TransPennine Express has branded all of their new fleet under the general name Nova, with the Class 397 units branded as Nova 2. The first unit entered service on 30 November 2019.

== History ==
The announcement of new trains was made by FirstGroup when it was confirmed that they would become the next operator of the TransPennine Express franchise from 1 April 2016. In May 2016 it was announced by TransPennine Express that they had ordered 12 five-car electric multiple units from CAF to replace the fleet of ten four-car Class 350/4 Desiro units which previously operated TransPennine Express services between Liverpool, Manchester and Scotland.

Testing of the first set began at the Velim railway test circuit in July 2018.

An option for up to 22 extra units was available to TransPennine Express, but it was not exercised.

In May 2023, 397011 received special Eurovision branding to celebrate the event taking place in Liverpool.

== Operation ==
The new units, branded as Nova 2, were launched officially by TPE at Liverpool Lime Street with other members of the Nova fleet. The first unit entered service on 30 November 2019.

== Fleet details ==
| Class | Operator | Quantity | Year built | Cars per unit | Unit nos. |
|---|---|---|---|---|---|
| 397 | TransPennine Express | 12 | 2017–2019 | 5 | 397001–397012 |

The units were designed as an intercity train. This included the addition of single doors at the ends of the coach, a maximum speed of 125 mph (201 km/h) and first class with catering provision from the on-board galley kitchen. Wi-Fi and seat reservations are also available on the train. These trains were also awarded the Golden Spanner Award for maintenance reliability.

=== Named trains ===
TPE Class 397 units with special names or liveries
| Unit number | Date | Name |
|---|---|---|
| 397011 | 3 May 2023 | Eurovision 2023 / Welcome to Liverpool |

=== Livery illustration ===
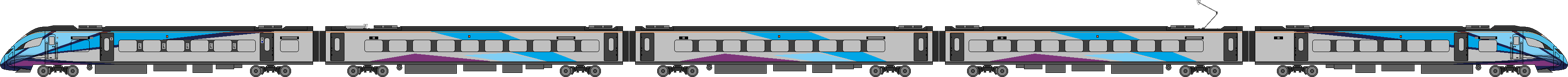
TransPennine Express Class 397 'Nova 2'

== See also ==
- British Rail Class 195 – A diesel multiple unit variant of the CAF Civity UK platform built for Northern.
- British Rail Class 196 – A diesel multiple unit variant of the CAF Civity UK platform built for West Midlands Trains.
- British Rail Class 197 – A diesel multiple unit variant of the CAF Civity UK platform built for Transport for Wales Rail.
- British Rail Class 331 – An electric multiple unit variant of the CAF Civity UK platform built for Northern.
- British Rail Class 897 – A tri-mode multiple unit variant of the CAF Civity UK platform to be built for London North Eastern Railway.
