= TransPennine Express (2016–2023) =

Former British train operating company

First TransPennine Express Limited

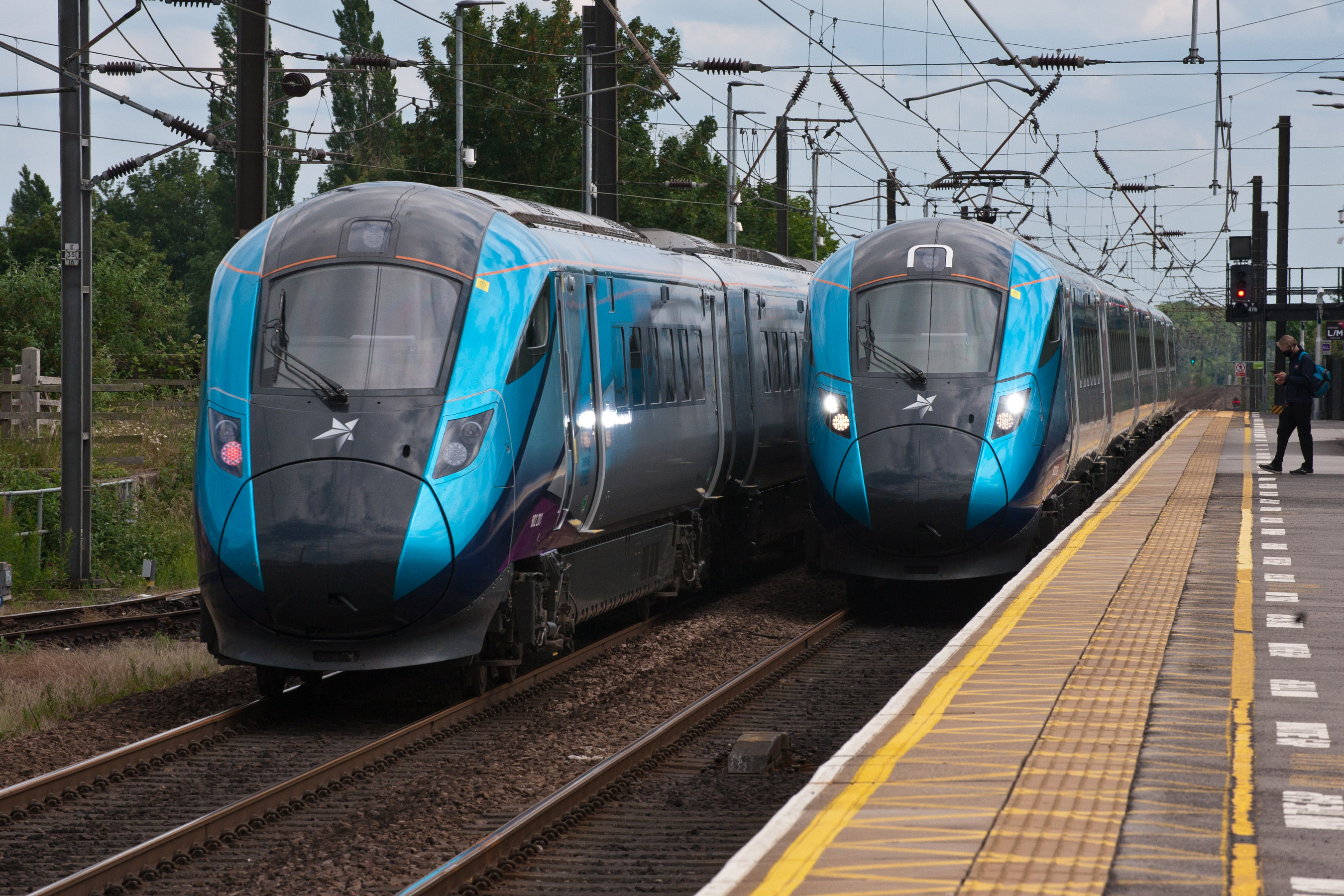
- Two Class 802 units passing at Northallerton in June 2020

Overview
- Franchises: TransPennine Express; 1 April 2016 – 28 May 2023
- Main routes: North West England, Yorkshire and the Humber, North East England, Scotland
- Fleet: 14 × Class 68 locomotives + 66 Mark 5A coaches (forming 13 loco-hauled Nova 3 sets); 51 × Class 185 Desiro; 12 × Class 397 Civity (Nova 2); 19 × Class 802 AT300 (Nova 1)
- Stations operated: 19
- Parent company: FirstGroup
- Reporting mark: TP
- Predecessor: First TransPennine Express
- Successor: TransPennine Trains trading as TransPennine Express
System map

First TransPennine Express Limited, trading as TransPennine Express (TPE), was a British train operating company owned by FirstGroup that operated the TransPennine Express franchise. It ran regional and inter-city rail services between the major cities and towns of Northern England and Scotland.

The franchise operated almost all its services to and through Manchester covering three main routes. The service provided rail links for major towns and cities such as Edinburgh, Glasgow, Liverpool, Sheffield, Hull, Leeds, York, Scarborough, Cleethorpes, Middlesbrough and Newcastle upon Tyne. TPE ran trains 24 hours a day, including through New Year's Eve night. TPE trains ran between York, Leeds and Manchester Airport at least every three hours every night of the week. The franchise operated across the West Coast Main Line, Huddersfield Line, East Coast Main Line and part of the Tees Valley line.

The majority of TPE's rolling stock was procured during the late 2010s under Project Nova. These consist of the Nova 1 (Class 802) BMU trainsets, the Nova 2 Class 397 CAF Civity EMUs, and the Nova 3 Mark 5A fixed-formation carriages paired with Class 68 diesel locomotives. These replaced older rolling stock, such as the Bombardier Turbostar 170/3s and Siemens Desiro 350/4s, as well as some of their Siemens Desiro 185s, although these were still used on some routes. TPE had facilitated an operational shift towards more inter-city style services, although the commuter market remains important.

In May 2023, following a period of poor performance, it was announced that the company's contract would not be renewed and the service taken over by state-owned train operating company of the same name on 28 May 2023. The decision to bring the service under the control of the operator of last resort was described as temporary, and it was said to be the then-UK government's intention that the franchise would be privatised again. Following the 2024 United Kingdom general election and the election of the pro-nationalisation Labour Party, reprivatisation has been cancelled. Instead the service will eventually be rolled into Great British Railways.

== History ==
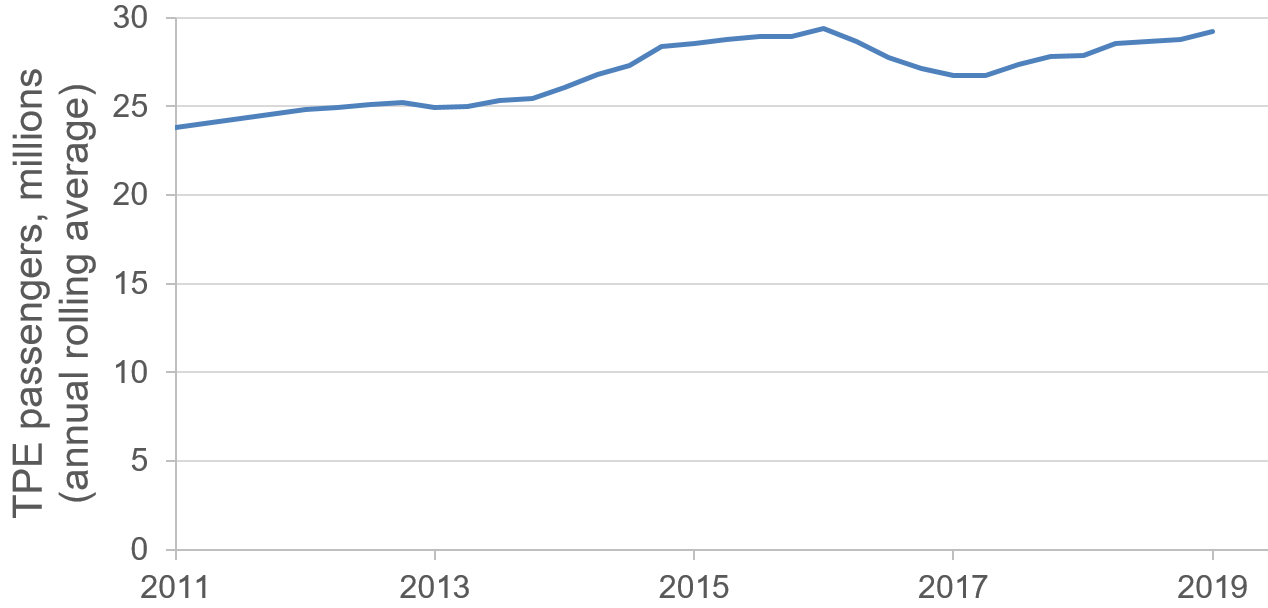
Passenger journeys on the Transpennine franchise from 2010–11 to 2018–19, showing a gradual rise except for a drop in 2016 after some services transferred to Northern.

The TransPennine Express brand was launched in the early 1990s by British Rail's Regional Railways sector. It became part of Regional Railways North East and, on 2 March 1997, was privatised along with the majority of British Rail. Its first private sector operator, Northern Spirit, as well as its successor, Arriva Trains Northern, opted to maintain the brand.

In 2000, the Strategic Rail Authority announced that it planned to reorganise the North West Regional Railways and Regional Railways North East franchises operated by First North Western and Arriva Trains Northern. A TransPennine Express franchise would be created for the long-distance regional services, the remaining services being operated by a new Northern franchise.

In July 2003, the TransPennine franchise was awarded to a joint venture between FirstGroup and Keolis, and the services operated by Arriva Trains Northern and First North Western were transferred to First TransPennine Express on 1 February 2004. On 11 November 2007, the services from the Manchester station group to Edinburgh Waverley and Glasgow Central via the West Coast Main Line formerly operated by Virgin CrossCountry were transferred to First TransPennine Express.

In August 2014, the Department for Transport (DfT) announced FirstGroup, Keolis/Go-Ahead and Stagecoach had been shortlisted to bid for the next franchise. During December 2015, FirstGroup was awarded the franchise of TransPennine Express. The effective start date of the new franchise was 1 April 2016 and it was scheduled to run until 31 March 2023, with an option to extend for two years. The company remained First TransPennine Express, but branded the services as TransPennine Express.

As part of a recasting of the franchise map by the DfT, services from Manchester Airport to Blackpool North; Manchester Airport to Barrow-in-Furness; and Oxenholme Lake District to Windermere were transferred to the Northern franchise on 1 April 2016.

In May 2021, following various COVID-19 emergency measures, the company was given a direct award contract by the DfT running until 28 May 2023.

TransPennine Express was one of several train operators impacted by the 2022–2023 United Kingdom railway strikes, which were the first national rail strikes in the UK for three decades. Its workers were amongst those who are participating in industrial action due to a dispute over pay and working conditions.

On 11 May 2023, after months of continued cancellations and service disruptions, the DfT announced that the company's contract would not be renewed with TPE ceasing operations on 28 May 2023. Instead, the service was taken over by operator of last resort TransPennine Trains.

== Services ==
The TransPennine Express routes were subdivided into three operations:

- North Route, which includes all routes that pass through the core section between Manchester station group and Leeds;
- Anglo-Scottish Route, which consists of services on the West Coast Main Line;
- South Route, which includes services running on the Hope Valley Line and the South Humberside Main Line.

As of December 2022, TransPennine Express operated the following services off-peak, seven days a week:

North Route
Route	Frequency	Calling at
Liverpool Lime Street to Newcastle	1 tph	Newton-le-Willows, Manchester Victoria, Huddersfield, Leeds, York, Darlington, Durham
Liverpool Lime Street to Hull	1 tph	Lea Green, Manchester Victoria, Stalybridge, Huddersfield, Leeds, Selby, Brough
Manchester Airport to Saltburn	1 tph	Manchester Piccadilly, Manchester Oxford Road, Manchester Victoria, Huddersfield, Dewsbury, Leeds, York, Thirsk, Northallerton, Yarm, Thornaby, Middlesbrough, Redcar Central
Manchester Piccadilly to Newcastle	1 tp2h	Stalybridge, Greenfield, Marsden, Slaithwaite, Huddersfield, Dewsbury, Leeds, York, Northallerton, Darlington, Durham, Chester-le-Street; Alternates with services from Manchester Piccadilly to Scarborough.
Manchester Piccadilly to Scarborough	1 tp2h	Stalybridge, Huddersfield, Dewsbury, Leeds, York, Malton, Seamer; Alternates with services from Manchester Piccadilly to Newcastle and from York to Scarborough.
York to Scarborough	1 tp2h	Malton, Seamer; Alternates with services from Manchester Piccadilly to Scarborough.
Manchester Piccadilly to Huddersfield	1 tph	Stalybridge, Mossley, Greenfield, Marsden, Slaithwaite
Huddersfield to Leeds	1 tph	Deighton, Mirfield, Ravensthorpe, Dewsbury, Batley, Morley, Cottingley
Newcastle to Edinburgh Waverley	6 tpd	Morpeth, Alnmouth, Berwick-upon-Tweed, Reston, Dunbar; 2 trains per day run between Berwick-upon-Tweed and Edinburgh Waverley.
South Route
Route	Freq.	Calling at
Liverpool Lime Street to Cleethorpes	1 tph	Liverpool South Parkway, Warrington Central, Birchwood, Manchester Oxford Road, Manchester Piccadilly, Stockport, Sheffield, Meadowhall, Doncaster, Scunthorpe, Barnetby, Habrough, Grimsby Town
Anglo-Scottish Route
Route	Freq.	Calling at
Manchester Airport to Glasgow Central	1 tp2h	Manchester Piccadilly, Manchester Oxford Road, Preston, Lancaster, Oxenholme Lake District, Penrith North Lakes, Carlisle, Lockerbie, Motherwell; 1tpd runs between Preston and Glasgow Central only.; Alternates with services to Edinburgh Waverley, see below.
Manchester Airport to Edinburgh Waverley	1 tp2h	Manchester Piccadilly, Manchester Oxford Road, Preston, Lancaster, Oxenholme Lake District, Penrith North Lakes, Carlisle, Lockerbie, Haymarket (Note: Served to pick up only southbound and set down only northbound); Alternates with services to Glasgow Central, see above.
Liverpool Lime Street to Glasgow Central	2 tpd	St Helens Central, Wigan North Western, Preston, Lancaster Oxenholme Lake District, Carlisle, Lockerbie, Motherwell (1tpd)

== Rolling stock ==
When TransPennine Express began operation, it inherited a fleet of four Class 170 and 51 Class 185 DMUs, as well as ten Class 350/4 EMUs, from First TransPennine Express. The Class 170s were transferred to Chiltern Railways, where they were converted to Class 168s. Originally it was planned after all the new trains in the Nova fleet entered service, 22 of the 51 Class 185 DMUs would be returned to Eversholt Rail Group. However these remained with the franchise and allowed services to be strengthened. Further cascades of rolling stock occurred over time; shortly following the introduction of the Class 397 sets during 2020, all ten of the Class 350 EMUs were transferred to West Midlands Trains.

=== Project Nova ===
Upon its instatement, TransPennine Express (TPE) services were particularly heavily trafficked; prior to 2018, the operator reportedly operated the busiest trains in the country, and it was common for some passengers to be unable to be seated during rush hour. Reportedly, the franchise also aimed to reorientation its operations towards inter-city services over its inter-urban routes, although it shall continue to transport large numbers of commuters regardless. As a means of addressing these factors, TPE launched Project Nova, under which the vast majority of their existing rolling stock would be replaced by new-build trainsets with greater capacity. During 2016, TPE signed contracts valued at £500 million with Spanish rolling stock manufacturer Construcciones y Auxiliar de Ferrocarriles (CAF) to produce the majority of its Nova rolling stock. The Nova fleet is divided into three distinct categories; the Nova 1 being (Class 802) BMU sets derived from the Hitachi A-train family, the Nova 2 trainsets being CAF-built Class 397 Civity EMUs, and the Nova 3 sets consisting of locomotive-hauled CAF-built Mark 5A coaches.

The Nova 1 fleet had originally been ordered by TPE's predecessor as part of plans to bolster route capacity by 80%; having contracted with Hitachi Rail Europe for the latter to supply 19 five-car bi-mode trainsets. According to Robin Davis, TPE's head of new trains, a major rationale behind the Nova 1 fleet was its bi-mode capability, noting that electrification ambitions often had much uncertainty, while a bi-mode fleet eliminated the operational risk to such uncertainty. Davis also noted that, in the event of largescale electrification being funded and implemented, the Class 802s could have some of their engines removed to reduce roughly 15% of their weight and thus raise their efficiency. Furthermore, Leo Goodwin, TPE's managing director, has observed that while the Class 802s will have an initial maximum speed of 125 mph, they have the capability of being modified for operating at 140 mph if infrastructure upgrades were to permit such speeds at a future date.

The Nova 2 trainsets were CAF-built Class 397 EMUs, the design being a member of the preexisting Civity range. Davis observed the Class 397 procurement to be a natural fit in light of TPE's desire to rapidly increase capacity and CAF's reputation for speedily producing limited batches of trains. While the Class 397 is capable of attaining a maximum speed of 125 mph, it is limited to a service speed of 100 mph.

The Nova 3 trainsets use Mark 5A carriages, locomotive-hauled and designed for its inter-city routes. The choice to procure carriages was unusual for the UK market; it was reportedly the first procurement of such rolling stock since the Mark 4 sets for the InterCity 225 during the late 1980s. Davis claims that the expense of constructing DMUs suitable for inter-city services was prohibitive in comparison, and notes that it is to be operated as a fixed-formation push-pull train, not relying on run-arounds as historically performed by locomotive-hauled sets. From the onset, it was planned for these to be hauled by a small fleet of Class 68 locomotives, requiring minor control-oriented modifications by Stadler to do so. According to franchise documents filed with the Department for Transport (DfT), considerations have been made to alternatively hauling the Nova 3 carriages with Class 88 bi-mode locomotives, which are closely related to the Class 68; however, this would be dependent on relatively ambitious, and thus far unfunded, suggestions for widespread electrification in the region being fulfilled.

On 24 August 2019, the first new trains of the Nova fleet entered revenue service; these were the Nova 3 sets, comprising a Class 68 locomotive and a rake of Mark 5A coaches. On 28 September 2019, the Nova 1 (Class 802) sets followed, while operations of the Nova 2 trainsets (Class 397) commenced on 30 November 2019. TPE officially launched the Nova fleet on 22 November at Liverpool Lime Street station.

=== Fleet on termination of service ===
Family	Class	Image	Type	Top speed		Number	Carriages	Routes operated	Built
Family	Class	Image	Type	mph	km/h	Number	Carriages	Routes operated	Built
	Diesel multiple units								
Siemens Desiro	185		DHMU	100	160	51	3	North Route, South Route	2005–2006
	Bi-mode multiple units								
Hitachi AT300	802 Nova 1		BMU	124	200	19	5	Liverpool Lime Street – Newcastle; Manchester Piccadilly – Newcastle; Edinburgh – Newcastle; Edinburgh – Liverpool Lime Street	2017–2019
	Electric multiple units								
CAF Civity	397 Nova 2		EMU	125	200	12	5	Anglo-Scottish Route: Manchester Airport – Carlisle	2017–2019
	Locomotive hauled stock								
Stadler UKLight	68		Diesel locomotive	100	160	14	5	Manchester Piccadilly – Scarborough; York – Scarborough	2016–2017
CAF	Mark 5A Nova 3		Coach	125	200	52	5	Manchester Piccadilly – Scarborough; York – Scarborough	2017–2018
CAF	Mark 5A Nova 3		Driving Trailer	125	200	14	5	Manchester Piccadilly – Scarborough; York – Scarborough	2017–2018

=== Past fleet ===
Former units operated by TransPennine Express include:

Family	Class	Image	Type	mph	km/h	Number	Carriages	Routes operated	Built	Left fleet
Bombardier Turbostar	170		DMU	100	160	4	2	Manchester Piccadilly / Airport-Cleethorpes / Hull / York	2000	2016
Siemens Desiro	350		EMU	110	177	10	4	Anglo-Scottish Route	2013–2014	2019–2020

== Managed stations ==
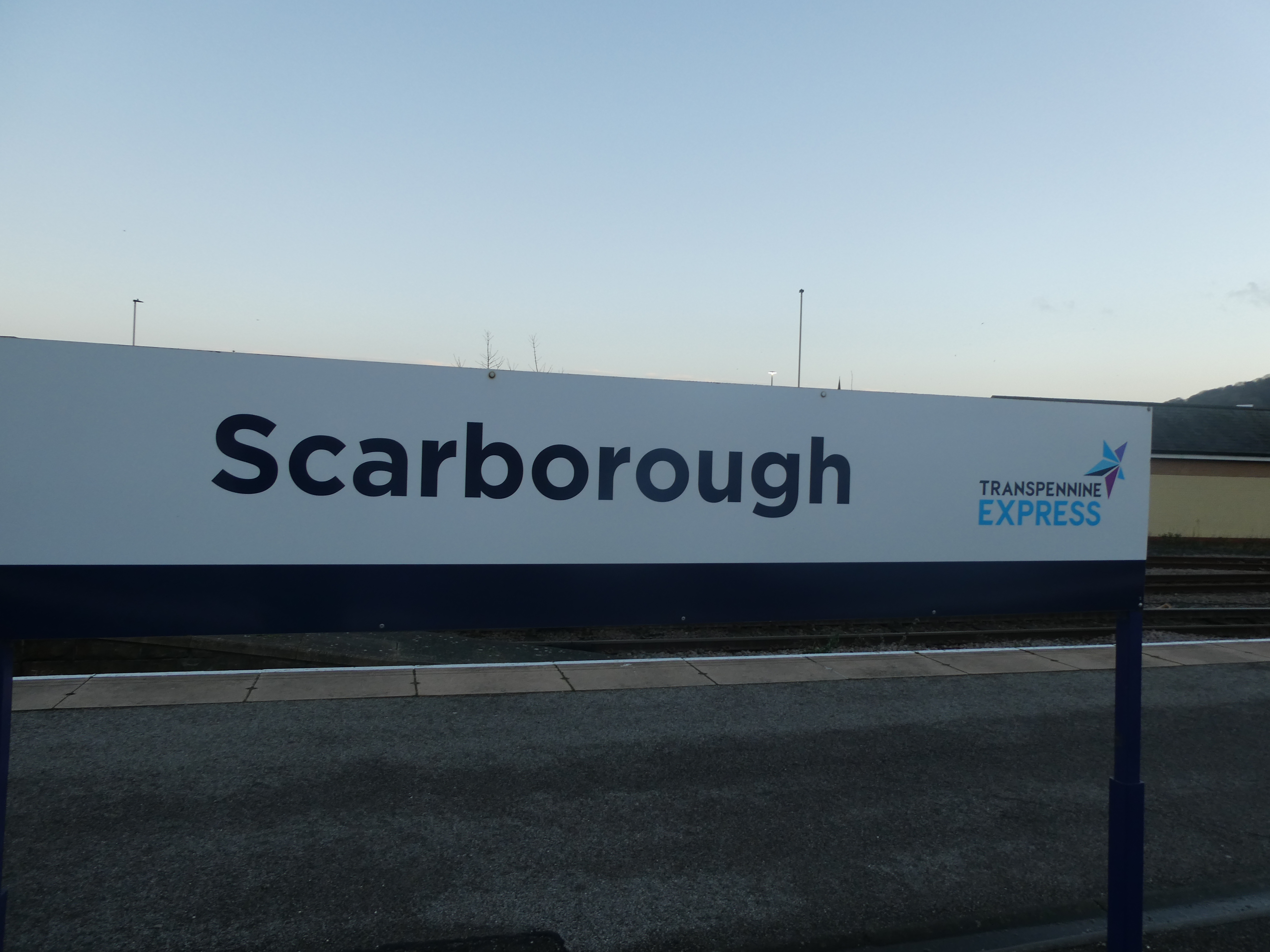
An example of TransPennine Express signage at Scarborough

TransPennine Express services ran over large areas of northern England and southern Scottish Lowlands. Many of the largest stations they served are managed by other train operating companies or Network Rail.

TransPennine Express managed the following 19 stations:

- Barnetby
- Brough
- Cleethorpes
- Dewsbury
- Grimsby Town
- Huddersfield
- Hull Paragon
- Malton
- Manchester Airport
- Middlesbrough
- Northallerton
- Scarborough
- Scunthorpe
- Seamer
- Selby
- Stalybridge
- Thirsk
- Thornaby
- Yarm

Some stations from the former franchise operator First TransPennine Express were transferred to Northern. These include Arnside, Barrow-in-Furness, Birchwood, Burneside, Carnforth, Grange-over-Sands, Kendal, Staveley, Ulverston, Warrington Central and Windermere.

== Depots and servicing ==
Siemens maintained the Class 185 fleet at Ardwick depot in Manchester with a smaller facility in York. Scottish stabling points for both stock included Polmadie TRSMD (Glasgow) and Craigentinny T.&R.S.M.D. (Edinburgh). Hitachi maintained the Class 802 fleet at Doncaster Carr and Craigentinny. The new EMUs and loco-hauled sets were to be maintained by Alstom, on behalf of TransPennine Express, at Longsight (Manchester), Edge Hill (Liverpool) and Polmadie (Glasgow). During 2020, in response to the COVID-19 pandemic, TPE invested £1.7 million into highly stringent rolling stock cleaning practices; these reportedly represented a 70% upsurge on pre-COVID-19 hygiene practices.

TransPennine Express had depots for its train crews at Manchester Piccadilly, Manchester Airport (conductors), York, Newcastle, Scarborough, Hull, Cleethorpes, Sheffield, Preston, Liverpool Lime Street and Glasgow Central.

== Criticism ==
The TransPennine Express service was often criticised. A satirical article in 2022 called it the "ironically named TransPennine Express. You'd hate to take the non-Express service. It might be quicker to walk."

The Guardian reported cancellations of 20-30% in October and November 2022 and 23% for the four weeks of 5 February to 4 March 2023.

Preceded by First TransPennine Express (FirstGroup and Keolis joint venture)	Operator of TransPennine Express franchise 2016–2023	Succeeded by TransPennine Express
