= Edge Hill Intercity Depot =

Railway maintenance depot in Edge Hill, Liverpool

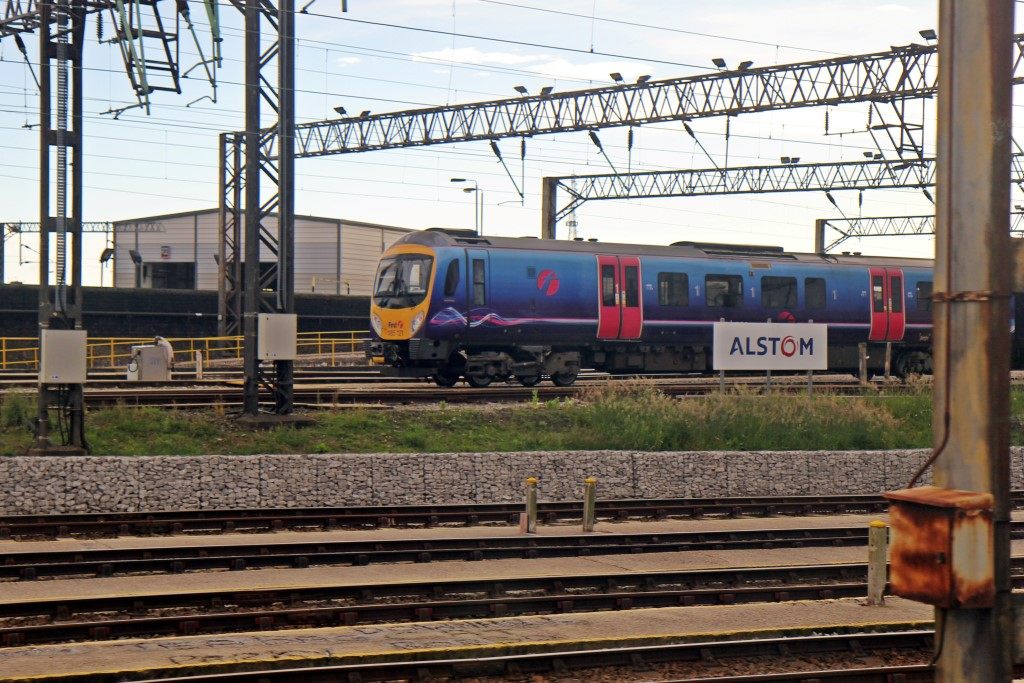
- A First TransPennine Express Class 185 at Alstom's Edge Hill depot
- Interactive map of Edge Hill Intercity Depot

Location
- Location: Edge Hill, Merseyside
- Coordinates: 53.4034°N 2.9358°W
- OS grid: SJ379899

Characteristics
- Owner: Avanti West Coast; TransPennine Express
- Depot code: LL (1973-)
- Type: DMU, EMU

History
- Former depot code: 8A (1948-May 1968); S.P (May 1968-1973)

Edge Hill Intercity Depot is a traction maintenance depot located in Edge Hill, Merseyside, England. The depot is situated at the junction of the Liverpool to Manchester Line and the Crewe to Liverpool Line, and is located to the east of Edge Hill station. The depot is built on the site of the former Cheshire Lines Committee Wavertree and Edge Hill goods station.

The depot code is LL.

== Allocation ==
As of 2023, the depot's allocation consists of TransPennine Express British Rail Class 802 and both Avanti West Coast Class 390 Pendolinos and 80X Evero units.
