= York Leeman Road depot =

Railway maintenance depot in York, England

York Leeman Road DMUD Siemens Traincare Depot, York
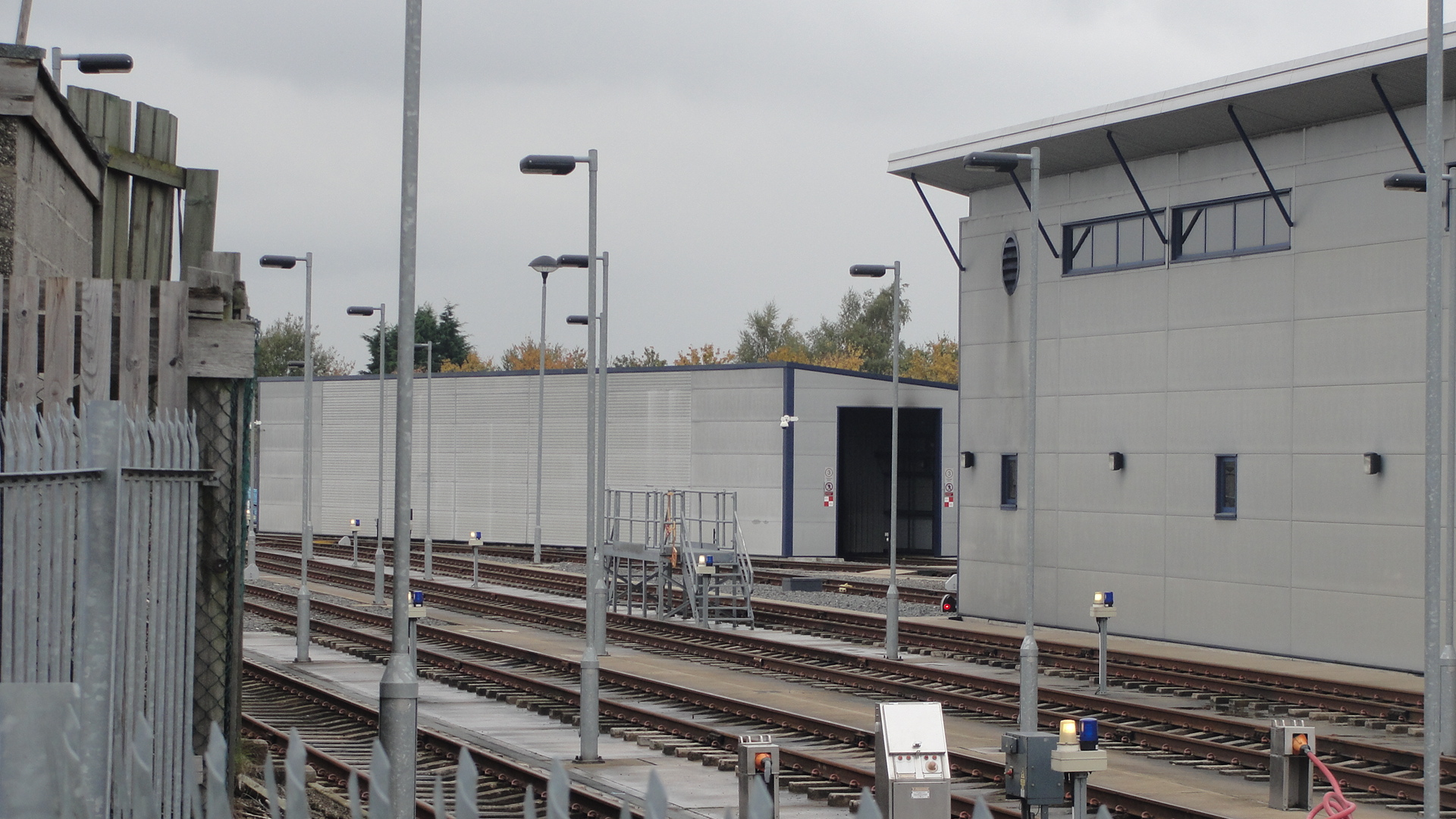
- The depot buildings in 2012
- Interactive map of York Leeman Road DMUD; Siemens Traincare Depot, York

Location
- Location: York, England
- Coordinates: 53.9620°N 1.0996°W

Characteristics
- Owner: Network Rail
- Depot code: YK (2007–present)
- Type: DMU

History
- Opened: 2007
- Original: Siemens

The York Leeman Road railway depot, (Note: Referred to as a DMUD (Diesel Multiple Unit Maintenance Depot) York Leeman Road in Passenger Rolling Stock Depot Planning Guidance (PDF), Network Rail, December 2011, Appendix 1:Passenger rolling stock depots within Great Britain, pp.61–63, archived from the original (PDF) on 12 November 2013) located in York, England, is a passenger multiple unit depot opened in May 2007 by Siemens. It services TransPennine Express Class 185s.

The facility's shed code is YK.

== History ==
Before the 1870s, the site area was known as Bishop Fields; it was undeveloped and in agricultural use. In 1877, the new Holgate railway station (see York railway station), and its associated loop line, opened. The loop line passed through Bishop Fields and through the 20th century surrounding land north of Leeman Road. It was extensively developed, much for railway use including a large engine shed to the east, with sidings and a large carriage shed to the west. In the latter part of the 20th century, there was some contraction; the carriage shed was removed and the engine shed ceased to have an operational role until it became part of the National Railway Museum in 1975. (Note: For history of the museum see National Railway Museum) In 2004, the site of the depot was occupied by a mixture of disused and in-use railway sidings.

=== TransPennine Express depot ===
In 2003, the new TransPennine Express franchise was awarded to First TransPennine Express (FTPE). As part of the franchise agreement, FTPE was to introduce a new fleet of 100 mph trains, together with new maintenance facilities for the fleet; the main depot was to be in Manchester, with a secondary depot in York. An order for 51 Class 185 diesel multiple units, and the associated maintenance facilities, was placed with Siemens in 2003.

The facilities required by the franchise agreement included: a one road three-car length shed, with sidings for 8 three-car trains; siding facilities for controlled emission toilet servicing and fuelling; train electric supply (125 A three phase); offices and stores; and a 1.5 t (1.5 long tons; 1.7 short tons) capacity overhead hoist.

In 2004, Siemens submitted a planning application for a depot on Leeman Road to York City Council, the plans were approved in May 2005. A ground breaking ceremony took place in December 2005. The main contractors for the £10m works were the Spencer Group. The depot was opened in May 2007, by Prince Andrew, Duke of York.

Since April 2016, the Class 185s have been operated by TransPennine Express (TPE). In 2018, work began on an £11 million upgrade to the depot, which included signalling upgrades and road lengthening. The project was undertaken to allow the depot to accommodate Class 68 with Mark 5A carriages and Class 802 units.

== Allocation and stabling ==
As of 2018, the depot's allocation consists of TransPennine Express Class 185 Desiros. From the December 2025 timetable change the depot also stables and services one Class 802 unit per night.
