= First TransPennine Express =

Former train operating company

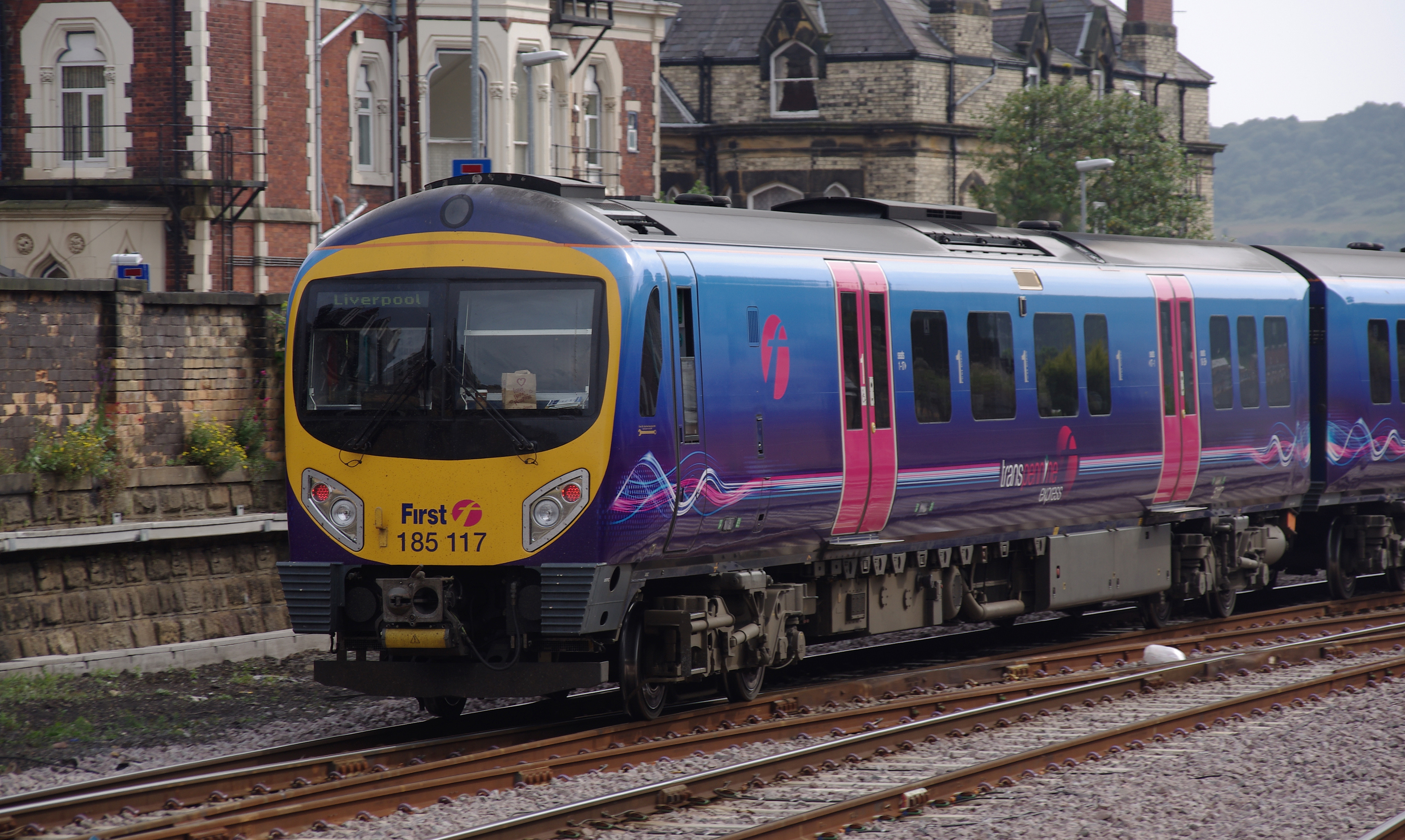
- A Class 185 Desiro at Scarborough in 2011

Overview
- Franchise: TransPennine Express 1 February 2004 – 31 March 2016
- Main routes: North West England, Yorkshire and Humber, North East England, Scotland
- Fleet: 67 units (6 units were subleased from Northern Rail)
- Stations called at: 90
- Stations operated: 30
- Parent company: FirstGroup (55%); Keolis (45%)
- Reporting mark: TP
- Predecessors: Arriva Trains Northern; First North Western
- Successor: TransPennine Express

First TransPennine Express was a British train operating company jointly owned by FirstGroup and Keolis which operated the TransPennine Express franchise. First TransPennine Express ran regular Express regional railway services between the major cities of Northern England as well as Scotland.

The franchise operated all its services to and through Manchester covering three main routes. The service provided rail links for major towns and cities such as Edinburgh, Glasgow, Liverpool, Sheffield, Hull, Leeds, York, Scarborough, Middlesbrough and Newcastle. Previously, all services called or terminated at Manchester Piccadilly, but, as of May 2014, a new service running between Newcastle and Liverpool Lime Street, calling at Manchester Victoria was announced, and launched as part of the Northern Hub plan.

When the franchise was re-tendered, FirstGroup and Keolis tendered separately. The franchise was awarded solely to FirstGroup, which traded as TransPennine Express.

== History ==
Previous logo

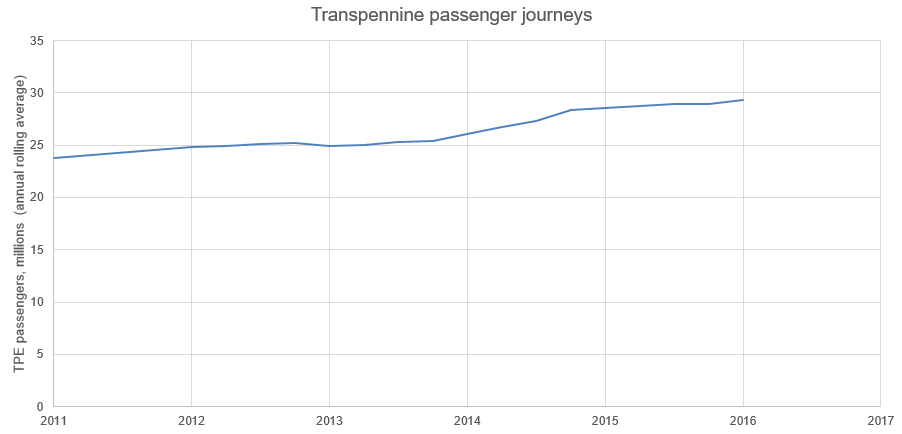
Passenger journeys on First TransPennine Express in millions from 2011 to 2016 (financial year, rolling annual average)

The TransPennine Express brand was launched in the early 1990s by British Rail, and maintained by the privatised operator Northern Spirit and its successor, Arriva Trains Northern.

In 2000, the Strategic Rail Authority announced that it planned to reorganise the North West Regional Railways and Regional Railways North East franchises operated by First North Western and Arriva Trains Northern. A TransPennine Express franchise would be created for the long-distance regional services while the remaining services were to be operated by a new Northern franchise. In July 2003, the TransPennine Express franchise was awarded to a joint venture between FirstGroup and Keolis, and the services formerly operated by Arriva Trains Northern and First North Western were transferred to First TransPennine Express on 1 February 2004.

The franchise was originally scheduled to end on 31 January 2012; however, in August 2011, the Department for Transport awarded First TransPennine Express a contract extension until March 2015. Included was a clause to allow the end date to be brought forward to April 2014 to coincide with the end-date of the Northern Rail franchise. In March 2013, the Secretary of State for Transport announced the franchise would again be extended until 1 April 2016. Despite this announcement, the long-term future of the franchise remained uncertain; local transport authorities and consultancies proposed merging Trans-Pennine services into other franchises, speculating that this would increase efficiency on the rail network. Specifically, the Manchester Airport to Scotland service could be transferred to the InterCity West Coast franchise after the electrification of lines around Manchester by 2018, while the south Trans-Pennine route between Manchester and Cleethorpes could be transferred to East Midlands Trains, who operated an hourly service on the Manchester to Sheffield section.

In June 2014, the DfT confirmed that there would be two separate franchises in the north of England, one focused on delivering intercity rail services and the second to provide local rail services. At the time, proposals were made to transfer services including York to Scarborough and Doncaster to Cleethorpes services to the Northern franchise and transfer the Nottingham to Liverpool portion of the Norwich to Liverpool service operated by East Midlands Trains to the TransPennine franchise.

During August 2014, the DfT announced that FirstGroup, Keolis/Go-Ahead and Stagecoach had been shortlisted to bid for the next franchise. On 9 December 2015, FirstGroup was awarded the franchise in its own right with TransPennine Express taking over on 1 April 2016.

== Services ==
=== North TransPennine ===
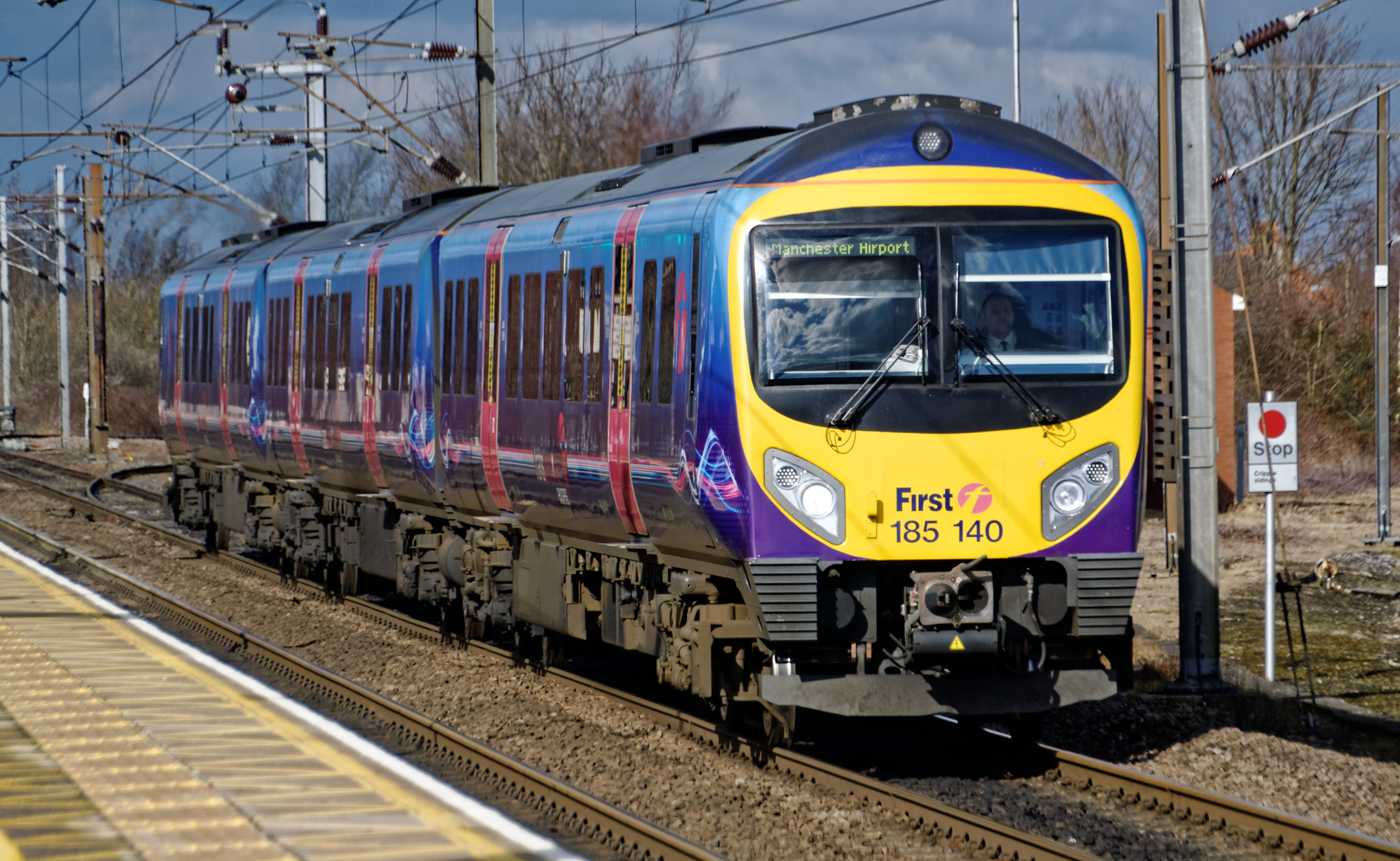
First TransPennine Express 185140 approaching Northallerton with a service bound for Manchester Airport.

As a result of timetable changes in May 2014, five trains per hour instead of four operated on the core route between Manchester and Leeds on the Huddersfield Line. This was made up of the following services:

- 1tph between Liverpool Lime Street and Newcastle via Manchester Victoria
- 1tph between Liverpool Lime Street and Scarborough via Warrington Central and Manchester Piccadilly
- 1tph between Manchester Airport and York via Manchester Piccadilly. This was also a 24-hour service.
- 1tph between Manchester Airport and Middlesbrough via Manchester Piccadilly
- 1tph between Manchester Piccadilly and Hull.

Most services between Manchester Airport and Newcastle ran early morning/late evenings.

Under Arriva Trains Northern, Newcastle services continued to Sunderland. When First TransPennine Express first took over the franchise it extended the Manchester to Hull service to Bridlington, a decision later reversed.

In May 2014, an hourly service between Liverpool Lime Street and Newcastle Central was introduced. It ran non-stop between Liverpool and Manchester Victoria and onward to Newcastle via Leeds reducing journey times between Liverpool and Manchester by 15 minutes and Liverpool to Leeds by 25 minutes.

=== South TransPennine ===
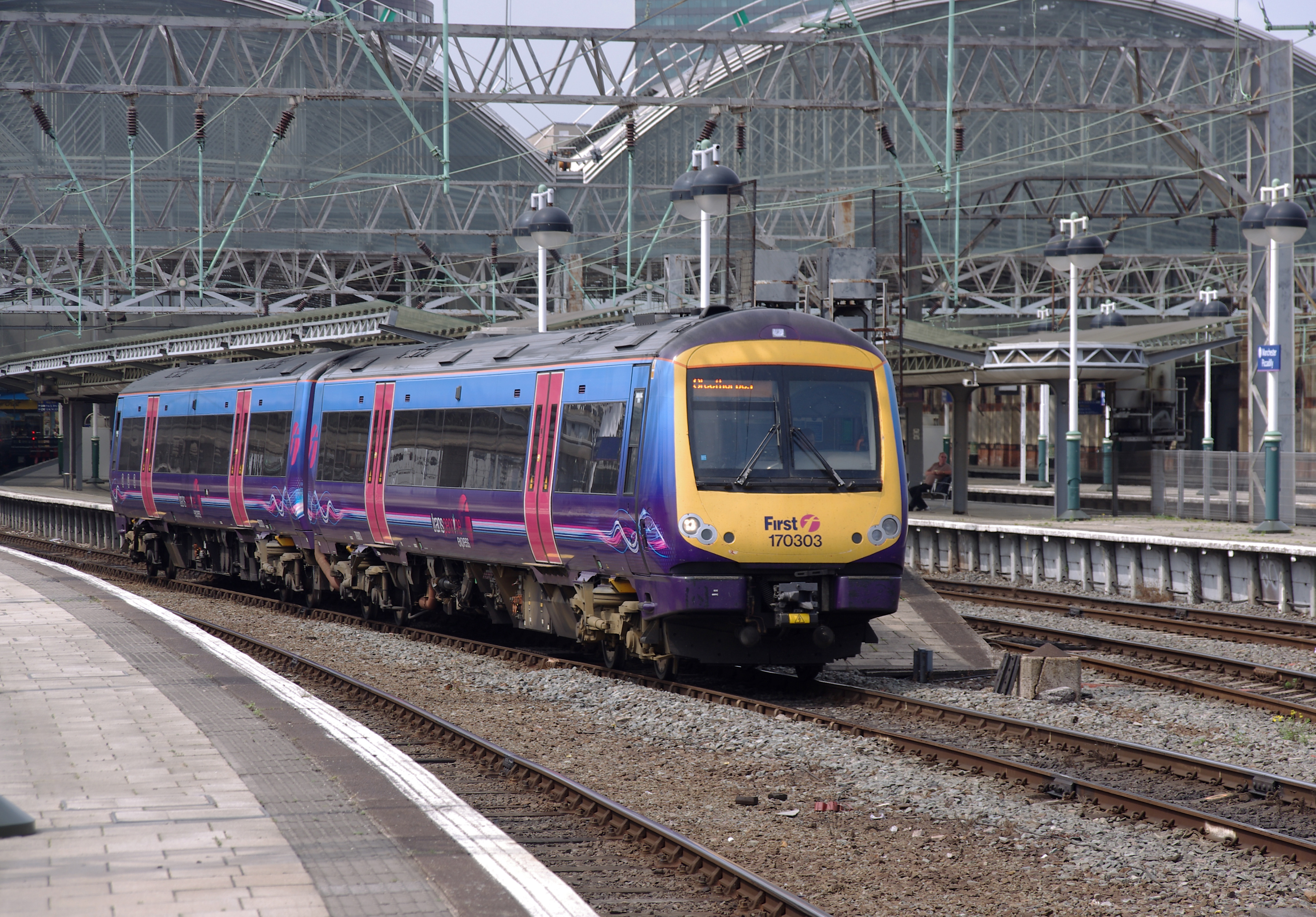
170303 at Manchester Piccadilly

An hourly service operated from Manchester Airport to Cleethorpes via Manchester Piccadilly, Stockport, Sheffield, Doncaster and Scunthorpe.

=== TransPennine North West ===
TransPennine North West used sections of the Styal Line, Manchester to Preston Line, West Coast Main Line, Furness Line and Windermere Branch Line. These services were formerly operated by First North Western with the exception of the Scottish routes, which were previously operated by Virgin CrossCountry from Manchester Piccadilly.

Following timetable changes in May 2014 the following services operated:

- 1tph between Manchester Airport and Blackpool North. Some services also ran to/from Barrow-in-Furness and Windermere which are detached/attached at Preston. A number of peak services start or terminate at Preston.
- 1tph between Manchester Airport and Glasgow Central or Edinburgh Waverley (alternating). Most of these services used Class 350s (some Edinburgh services run in 8 car formations) however a number of peak services were run by Class 185s via Bolton/Wigan North Western and Bolton/Chorley.

With the completion of the first stage of the North West electrification programme, the Scottish services were operated from 8 December 2013 by newly arrived Class 350 electric units and rerouted to stop at Wigan North Western after joining the West Coast Main Line close to Newton-le-Willows. Most stops at Bolton and Chorley were withdrawn as a result. With a number of peak services still operating via Bolton/Chorley or Bolton/Wigan North Western.

== Performance ==
Official performance figures released by the British railway infrastructure company Network Rail for period 7 of the financial year 2013/14 were down on the same period last year at 87.8% (PPM) and MAA up to 12 October 2013 stood at 90.5%.

== Rolling stock ==
First TransPennine Express inherited a fleet of two- and three-car Class 158 Express Sprinter trains from Arriva Trains Northern. It also operated Class 175 Coradias on hire from Arriva Trains Wales.

One of the most prominent commitments of the franchise was the replacement of the entire fleet. Various requirements of this new fleet of diesel multiple units were stipulated, such as the ability to operating at speeds up to 100 mph (160 km/h), comparable acceleration to the Class 180, the presence of air conditioning and two toilets per unit (one of which being suitable for reduced-mobility passengers), gangways between individual carriages, space for storing both luggage and bicycles, internal CCTV coverage, provision for wheelchair passengers, and first class seating. During September 2003, contract for supply and maintenance of 56 trains was signed between First TransPennine Express and the rolling stock manufacturer Siemens. During early 2004, the new train requirement was reduced from 56 to 51 units by the Strategic Rail Authority (SRA). These trains were specifically designed to traverse the steep hills encountered on the TransPennine routes and thus had a relatively high power output compared to other DMUs; however, as this level of power was unnecessary for most of the train's routes, it incurred relatively low fuel efficiency.

During 2006, First TransPennine Express acquired two static simulators from Corys TESS to better facilitate driver training ahead of the introduction of new rolling stock.

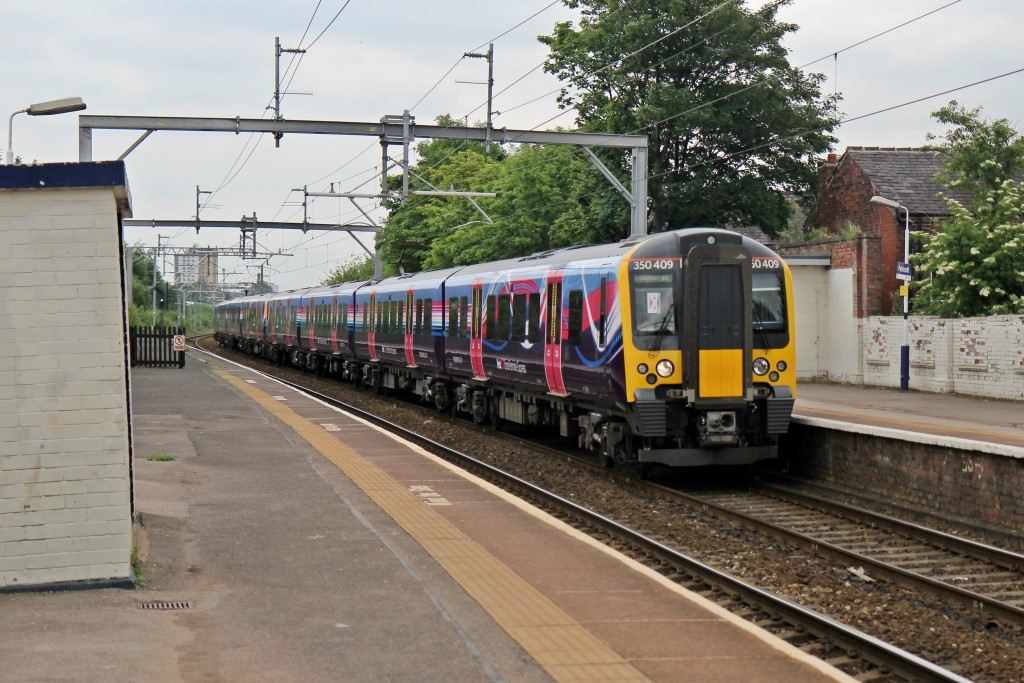
Class 350 at Patricroft

The Class 185 trains proved popular with off-peak travellers, although these satisfaction levels decreased for passengers undertaking long-distance journeys and at peak times. Despite the Class 185s having a higher passenger capacity than two-car Class 158s, passengers were frequently left behind due to severe overcrowding around peak times. During 2007, a report produced by Greater Manchester Passenger Transport Executive (GMPTE) stated that projected passenger numbers would likely necessitate the introduction of 100–125 mph (161–201 km/h) 8-car trains by 2014.

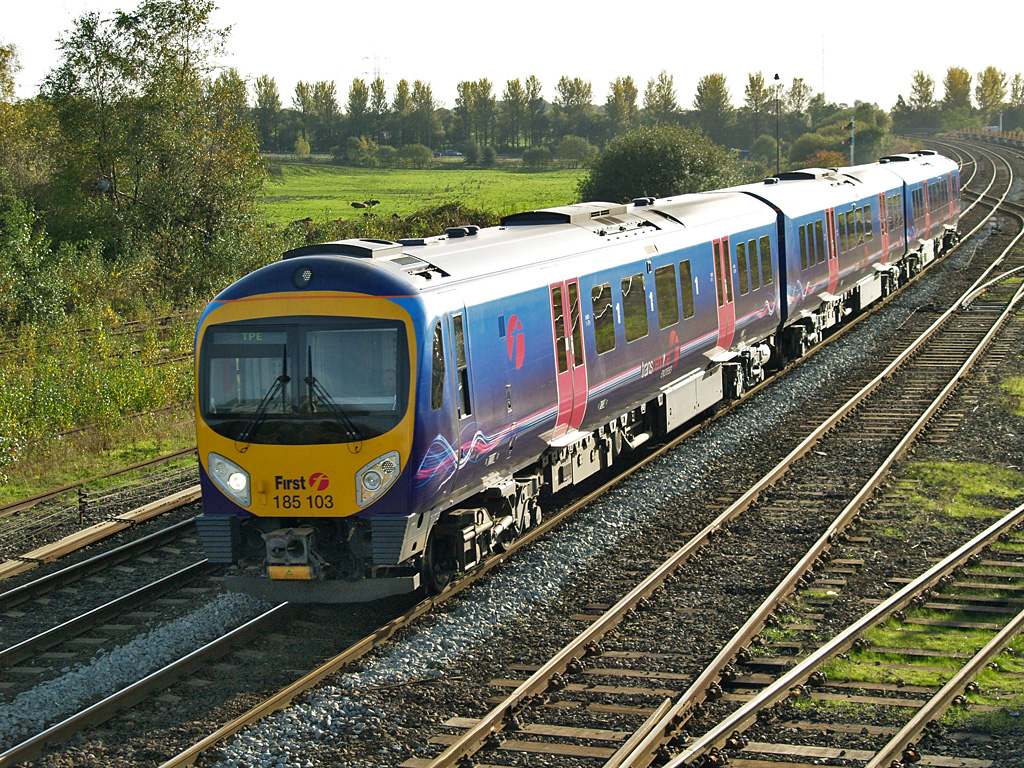
Class 185 at Castleton East Junction

At one point, it was planned to all services to be operated by the new Class 185 Desiros; however, weight restrictions on the Micklefield to Hull line restricted the Class 185s to 65–75 mph (105–121 km/h). To resolve this issue as well as to create extra capacity, First TransPennine Express leased eight Class 170 Turbostars from late 2006 that were surplus to South West Trains' requirements, and in November 2007 a ninth was transferred from Central Trains. The Class 185 fleet operated across the network while the Class 170 multiple units were used on services from Manchester to Cleethorpes, Hull and York.

During May 2014, the Class 350/4s electric multiple units commenced operation on services between Manchester and Scotland. This arrangement enabled the diesel trains previously used on the Manchester to Scotland services to be transferred to other TransPennine Express services. The Manchester Airport to Blackpool route was also electrified, allowing further diesel trains to be cascaded on to other TransPennine Express services. However, this work was not completed until after the end of the former TransPennine Express franchise.

In February 2012, the Department for Transport announced that 10 four-car electric Class 350 Desiros had been ordered to operate services from Manchester to Scotland via Wigan after electrification. It was confirmed that all the existing rolling stock would remain with the franchise to boost capacity.

However, in March 2014, it was announced that the nine Class 170 Turbostars would move to Chiltern Railways. MP Stephen Hammond revealed on 12 March 2014 that all of the Class 170/3s would remain with First TransPennine Express until the May 2015 timetable change.

In January 2015, it was confirmed Chiltern would take five of the Class 170s from May 2015 and the other four from February 2016. First TransPennine hired Class 156 Super Sprinters (which were originally intended to be used for extra capacity on Northern Rail services) from Northern Rail to work in pairs on the Manchester Airport-Blackpool North route, ahead of that route's transfer (along with the services to Barrow-in-Furness and Windermere) to the new Northern franchise in April 2016.

=== Fleet at end of franchise ===
Class	Image	Type	Top speed		Number	Routes operated	Built
Class	Image	Type	mph	km/h	Number	Routes operated	Built
Diesel multiple units
156 Super Sprinter		DMU	75	120	6	Manchester Airport–Blackpool North	1987–1989
185 Desiro		DMU	100	160	51	North TransPennine & South TransPennine	2005–2006
170/3 Turbostar		DMU	100	160	4	Manchester Piccadilly–Cleethorpes/Hull/York	2000
Electric multiple units
350/4 Desiro		EMU	110	180	10	Anglo-Scottish Route	2013–2014

== Depots ==
First TransPennine Express's franchise agreement required the establishment of two new depots equipped to handle the new rolling stock that it was to operate. The primary depot was to be sited in Manchester while a secondary depot suitable for both stabling and maintenance activities was to be based at York. In addition, an existing depot at Cleethorpes was to be upgraded with refuelling and controlled-emission toilet servicing facilities and a train electric auxiliary supply.

Construction of the Ardwick train depot began in March 2005 and was completed in 2006. In December 2005, work started on the new Leeman Road depot in York; it was opened during May 2007.

== Managed stations ==
First TransPennine Express managed the following 30 stations, many of which transferred to TransPennine (First Group):

- Arnside
- Barnetby
- Barrow-in-Furness
- Birchwood
- Brough
- Burneside
- Carnforth
- Cleethorpes
- Dewsbury
- Grange-over-Sands
- Grimsby Town
- Huddersfield
- Hull Paragon
- Kendal
- Malton
- Manchester Airport
- Middlesbrough
- Northallerton
- Scarborough
- Scunthorpe
- Seamer
- Selby
- Stalybridge
- Staveley
- Thirsk
- Thornaby
- Ulverston
- Warrington Central
- Windermere
- Yarm

Preceded by Arriva Trains Northern; Regional Railways North East franchise	Operator of TransPennine Express franchise 2004–2016	Succeeded by TransPennine Express (2016–2023) (operated solely by FirstGroup)
Preceded by First North Western; North West Regional Railways franchise	Operator of TransPennine Express franchise 2004–2016	Succeeded by TransPennine Express (2016–2023) (operated solely by FirstGroup)
