= Ardwick train depot =

Maintenance depot in Greater Manchester, England

Ardwick TMD
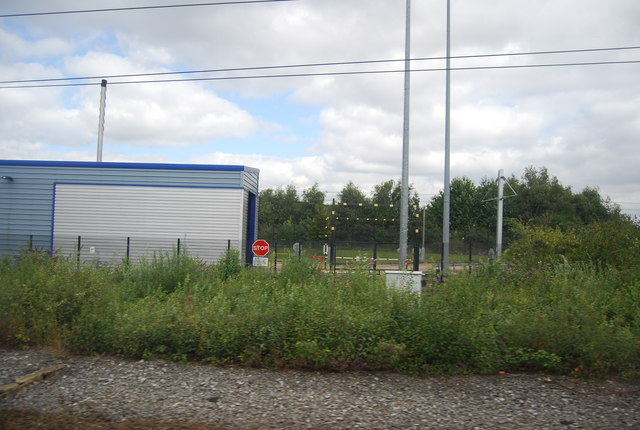
- Engine shed
- Interactive map of Ardwick TMD

Location
- Location: Ardwick, Greater Manchester, United Kingdom
- Coordinates: 53.4722°N 2.2069°W
- OS grid: SJ863973

Characteristics
- Depot code: AK
- Type: DMU, EMU
- Rolling stock: Class 185; Class 323

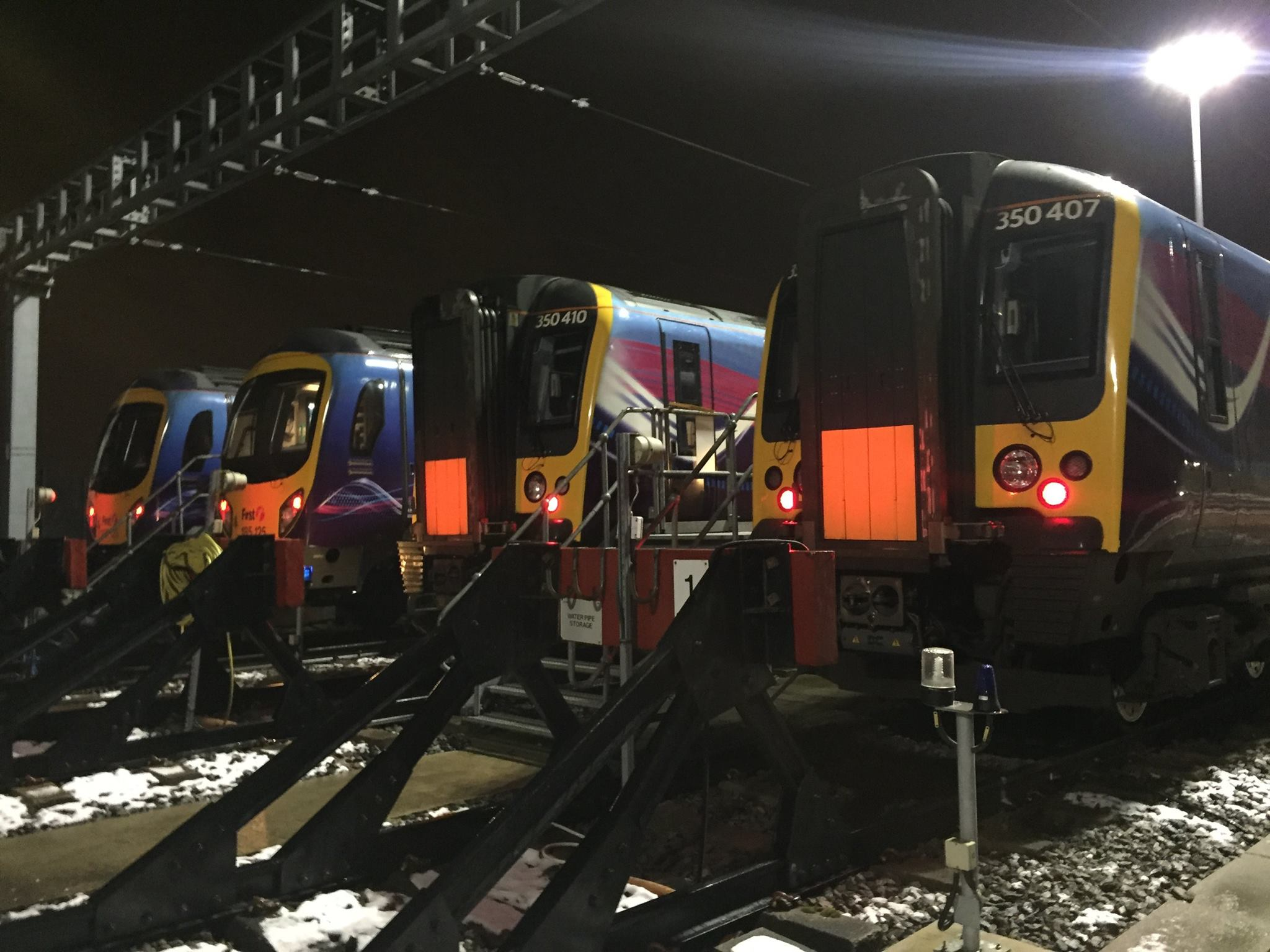
First TransPennine Express Class 185s and Class 350s stabled at the depot

The Ardwick train depot (Note: Also referred to as Ardwick T.M.D. (Network Rail), and Ardwick Traincare Facility (Siemens).) is a passenger multiple unit maintenance depot in Ardwick, Greater Manchester. The depot was opened in 2006 for the servicing of Siemens-built Class 185 DMUs, which are used on the TransPennine Express franchise. It was electrified in 2012–13 to allow the servicing of Siemens Class 350/4 EMUs.

== Location ==
Ardwick depot is located approximately 500 m (550 yd) east of Ardwick railway station, beside the Hope Valley Line and south of the A635 road.

The depot code is AK.

== History ==
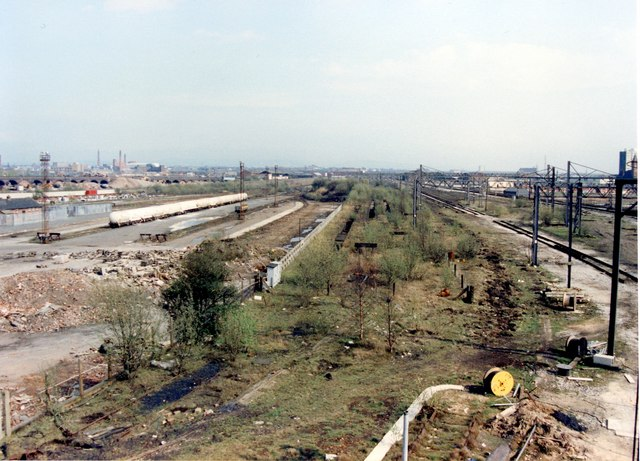
Ardwick railway yard in 1989, prior to the depot's construction

In the 1840s, the Sheffield, Ashton-under-Lyne and Manchester Railway was constructed between Manchester Store Street station (now known as Manchester Piccadilly) and Sheffield Victoria railway station. Initially, the site of the depot was just outside the urban spread of Manchester; the area was used for brick manufacture. Subsequently, the area east of Ardwick station and north of the line was used for railway sidings, including goods sheds; the wider area became known as Ardwick West Goods Depot and Mineral Yard, later Ardwick West Freight Terminal. The site remained in railway use through most of the 20th century, but became disused by 1990.

=== Siemens train maintenance depot ===
In 2003, Siemens was announced as the preferred bidder to supply and maintain a fleet of diesel multiple units for use on the TransPennine Express franchise. The £260 million contract included the provision and supply of maintenance facilities, with the primary facility in Manchester, along with a secondary depot in York. In 2004, Siemens applied to construct sidings, train facilities and offices on the Ardwick site.

The groundbreaking ceremony took place in March 2005. The depot was constructed on the 10 acres (4.0 ha) site over 13 months, being completed on 3 April 2006, at a cost of about £30 million. The designers were Burks Green; Taylor Woodrow were the main contractors; and NG Bailey and Atkins Rail were subcontractors. The main shed was a 6,000 m^{2} (65,000 sq ft) building capable of holding eight trains – a four-road shed with two three-car 23 m (75 ft) trains per road – with facilities including wheel lathe, train jacks, and bogie and engine drops. The depot was officially opened on 16 May 2006 by then-Transport Secretary Douglas Alexander.

In February 2012, Siemens obtained a contract to build and maintain twenty Class 350 Desiro 25 kV AC electric multiple units, including ten Class 350/4 units for First TransPennine Express. The contract required the overhead electrification of the depot. Work to modify the depot began in September 2012, with Spencer Rail (Spencer Group) as the main contractor. The depot was extended at the western end by 10 m (33 ft) to allow four 20 m (66 ft)-long car units to be accommodated, with one shed road and all of the outside track electrified. The estimated cost of the project was £5 million.

The depot's electrification was ceremonially opened by local MP, Lucy Powell, on 27 September 2013. The first of the Class 350/4 trains arrived at the depot on 28 November 2013.

== Allocation ==
As of 2026 Ardwick has an allocation of Class 185 DMUs and Class 323 EMUs.
