= British Rail Mark 5A =

Class of British railway coach

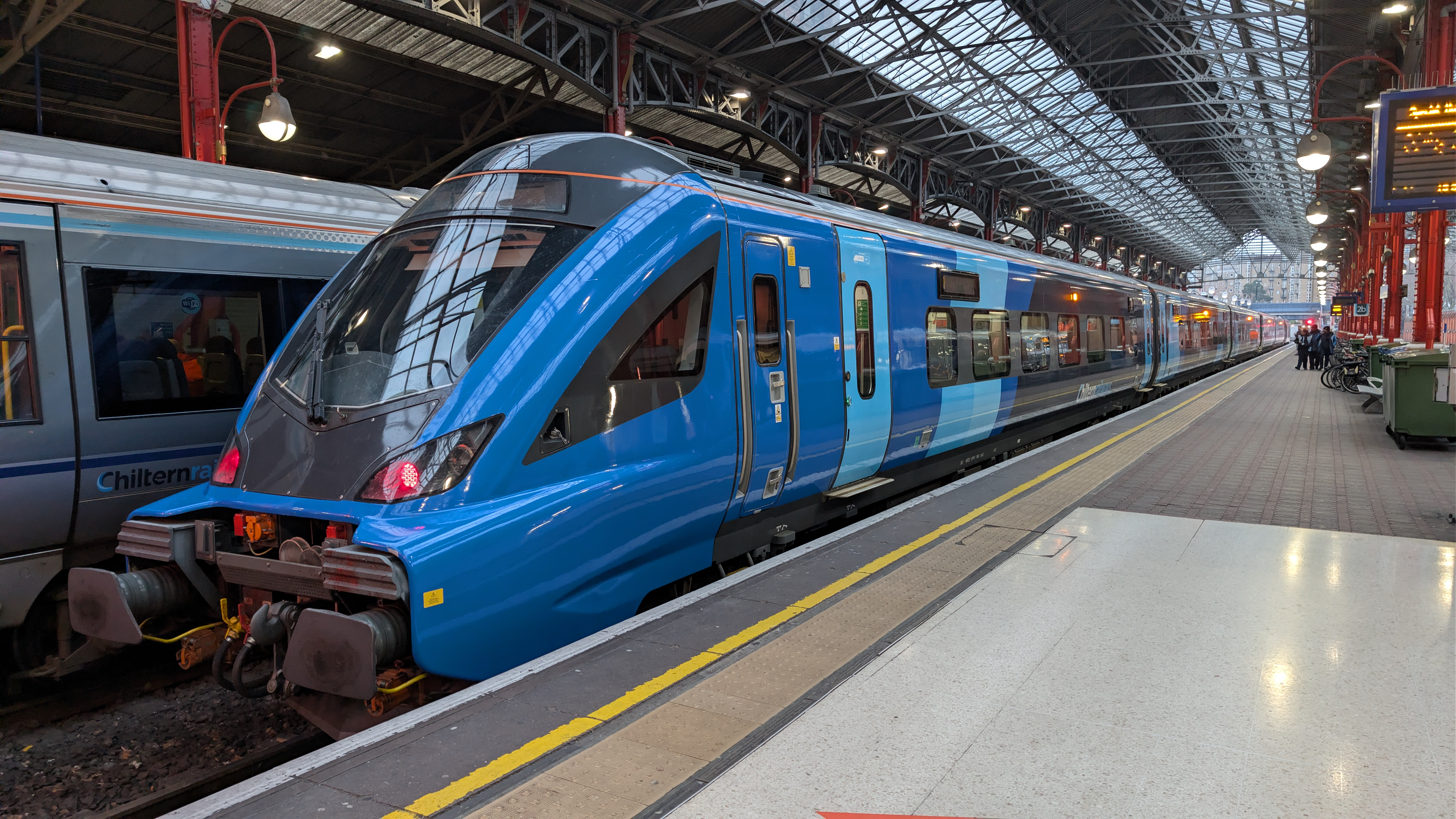
- Chiltern Railways Mark 5A coaches at London Marylebone

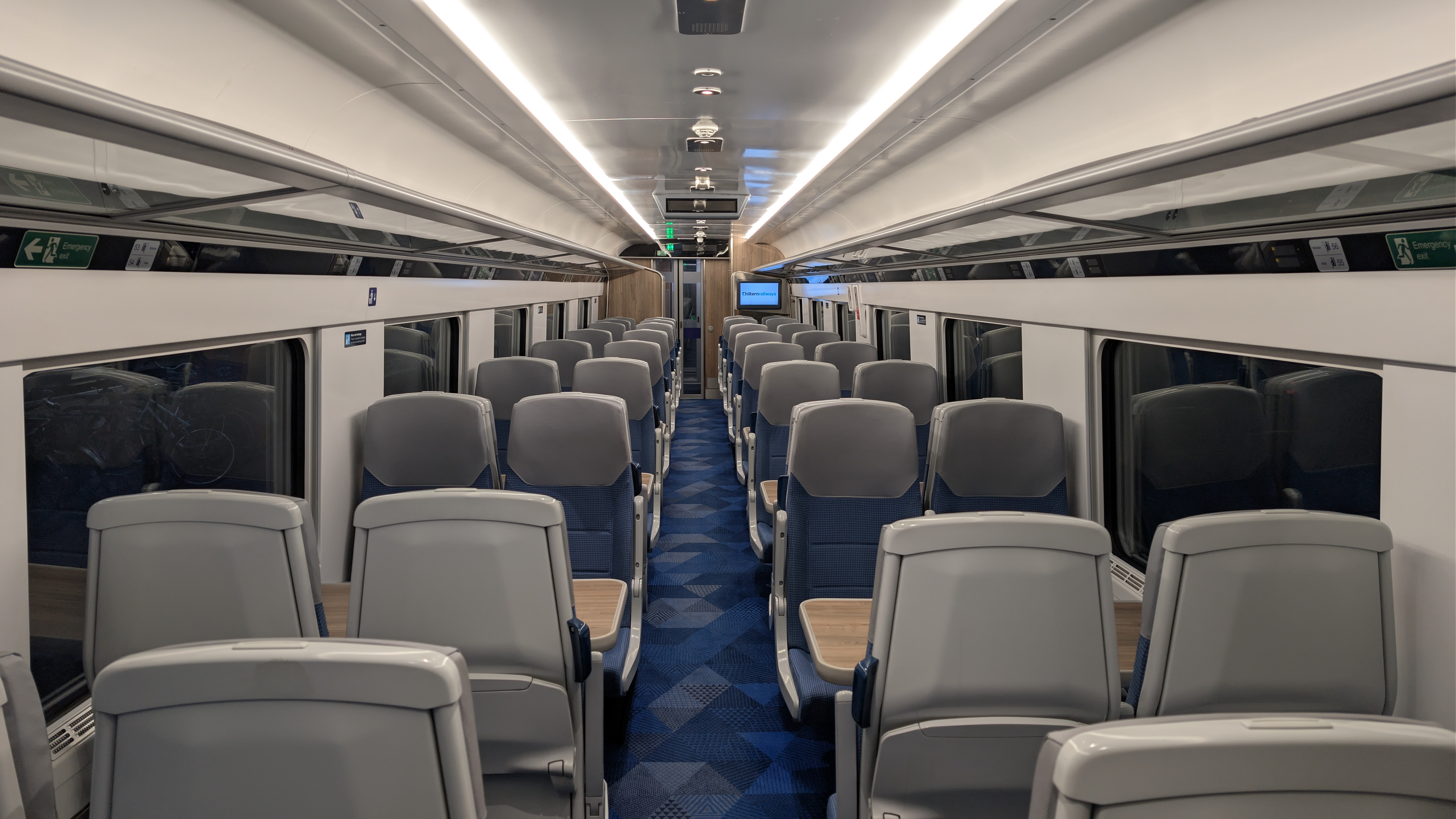
- Standard class interior of a Chiltern Railways Mark 5A coach
- In service: Chiltern Railways: 26 January 2026 – present; TransPennine Express: 24 August 2019 – 10 December 2023
- Manufacturer: CAF
- Built at: Beasain
- Constructed: 2017–2018
- Number built: 66
- Successor: Class 185; Class 802
- Fleet numbers: Current: CH01-CH12; Former: TP01-TP12
- Capacity: 291 seats (261 standard, 30 first class)
- Owner: Beacon Rail
- Operators: Current: Chiltern Railways; Former: TransPennine Express
- Depot: Longsight (Manchester)
- Lines served: Current: Chiltern Main Line; Former:North Pennine

Specifications
- Car body construction: Fully integral aluminium monocoque
- Car length: 22.2 m (72 ft 10 in) (intermediate trailer); 22.37 m (73 ft 5 in) (driving trailer)
- Width: 2.75 m (9 ft 0 in)
- Doors: Sliding plug, at body ends
- Maximum speed: 125 mph (201 km/h)
- Weight: max. tare 43 t (42 long tons; 47 short tons)
- Braking system: Cheek mounted discs
- Track gauge: 1,435 mm (4 ft 8 1/2 in) standard gauge

Notes/references
- Source unless specified

The British Rail Mark 5A is a type of railway vehicle in use in the UK. 52 standard carriages and 14 driving trailers were built by Spanish manufacturer CAF, and were operated by TransPennine Express until 2024, where they are now in service on Chiltern Railways. They first entered service on 24 August 2019, with the last set being withdrawn by TransPennine Express with the timetable change occurring on 10 December 2023. Chiltern Railways first introduced them in January 2026.

== Description ==
TransPennine Express announced in 2016 that they were to procure 126 new vehicles from CAF, which included 66 Mark 5A locomotive-hauled coaches. They would be formed into 13 five-carriage sets, hauled by Class 68 locomotives. This equates to 65 coaches for total service, with the 66th coach being a spare Driving Trailer. Each set is composed of one first class carriage with guard's area and catering provision, one standard class carriage with PRM toilet, two standard class carriages and a standard class Driving Trailer (DT).

In October 2016, production started on these coaches, and in March 2017, CAF and TPE released a photo of the first completed bodyshell. The first completed rake was sent for testing at Velim test centre in March 2018, the second set being delivered straight to the UK in May 2018 via Royal Portbury Dock ahead of their planned entry into service in the autumn of that year. In April 2019, the first Nova 3 set was officially handed over from CAF to TPE, after a mandatory period of fault-free running.

TransPennine Express branded their new trains under the general name Nova, with the Class 68 + Mark 5A combination given the name Nova 3.

Summary and numbering
Type	Seats	Builder	Numbers
Open First	30	CAF Beasain 2017–18	11501–13
Open Standard	69 or 59 + 6 tip-up	CAF Beasain 2017–18	12701–39
Driving Open Brake Standard	64	CAF Irun 2017–18	12801–14

== Current operation ==
=== Chiltern Railways ===
Following a successful tender on 21 July 2025 for replacement rolling stock to Beacon Rail for the full fleet of seven units of five carriages owned by Beacon Rail (Finance) Ltd., it was announced on 5 August that Chiltern Railways is to lease the full fleet of 13 five-carriage sets in order to replace its fleet of Mark 3 coaching stock.

The first sets entered passenger service on 26 January 2026 under new "Chiltern Explorer" branding.

== Former operation ==
=== TransPennine Express ===
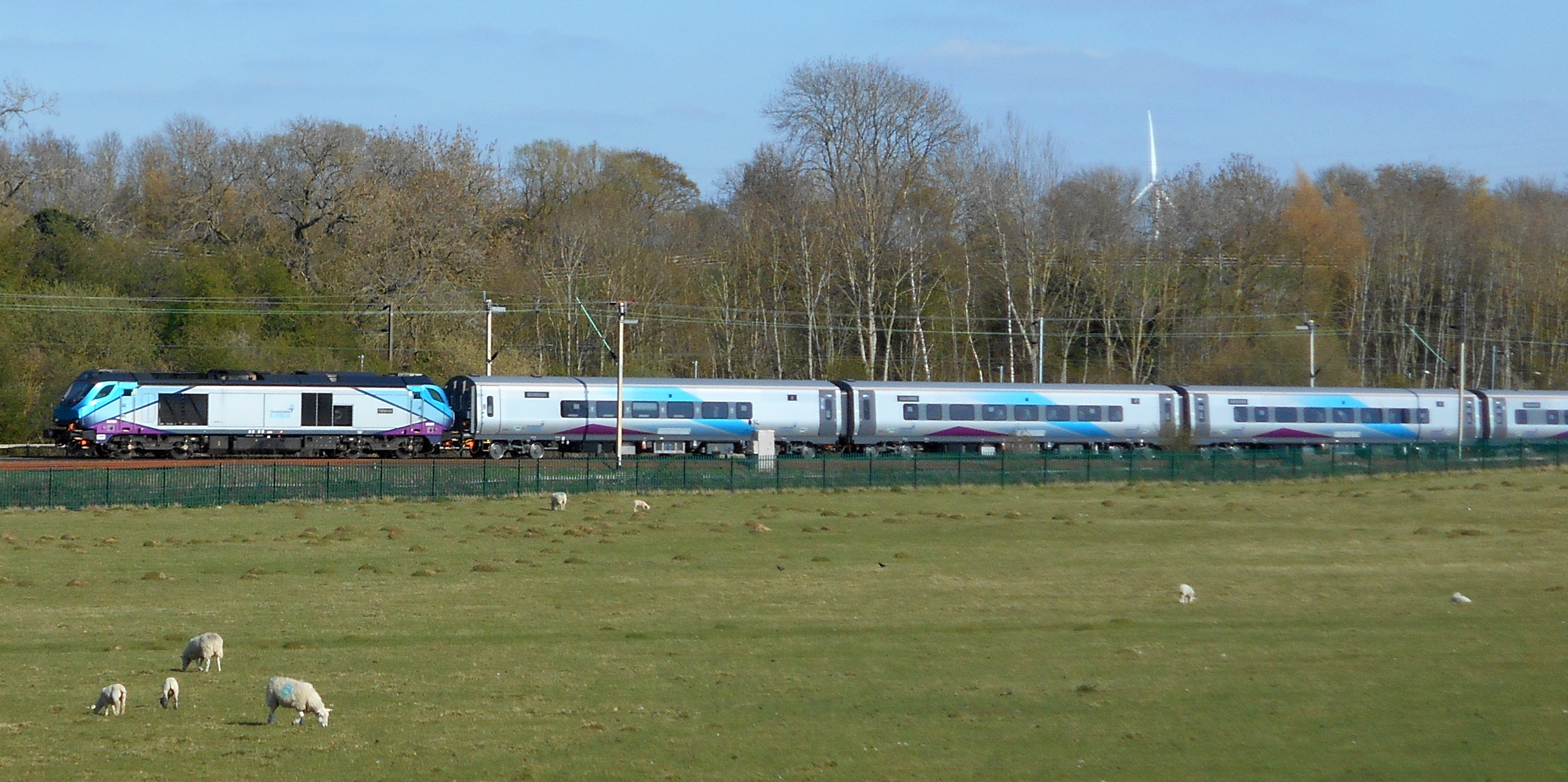
TPE set of Class 68 with Mark 5 coaches on a test run.

The sets were initially to be used on services between Liverpool Lime Street and Scarborough as well as between Manchester Airport and Saltburn. The first set entered service between Liverpool and Scarborough on 24 August 2019.

The Nova 3 was officially launched on 22 November 2019 at Liverpool Lime Street station alongside other members of the new Nova fleet.

By 2022, four sets were in use daily, making them the most underutilised fleets of passenger stock in the country at five years old. In 2023, faults were discovered in some Mark 5A coaches, including cracks on a number of coaches. Soon afterwards, TransPennine Express announced plans to withdraw their Mark 5A fleet from the December 2023 timetable revision; however the sets were still leased by TPE until May 2024, and remained in storage until entering service with Chiltern Railways in January 2026.
