= British Rail Class 185 =

British diesel passenger train

British Rail Class 185 Desiro
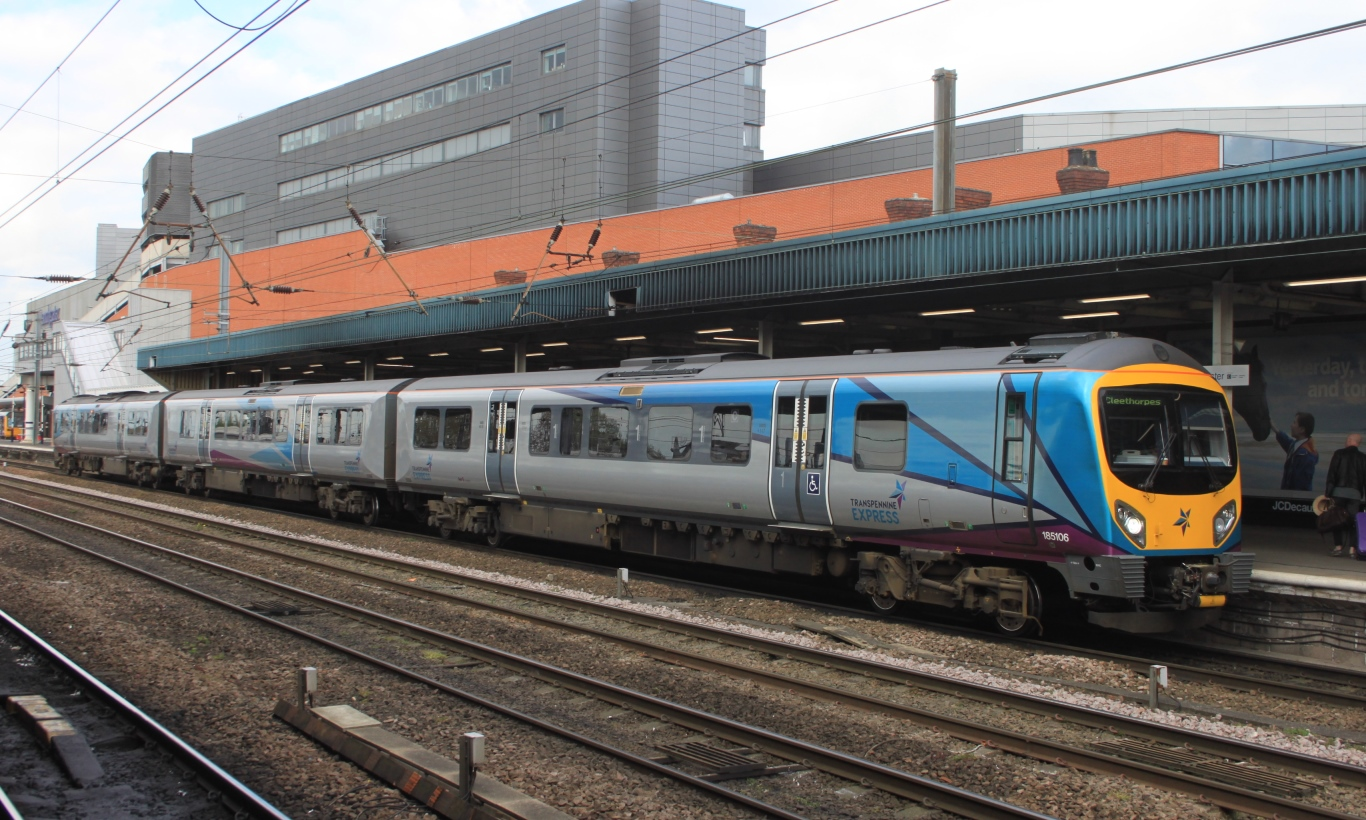
- TransPennine Express Class 185 at Doncaster in 2017

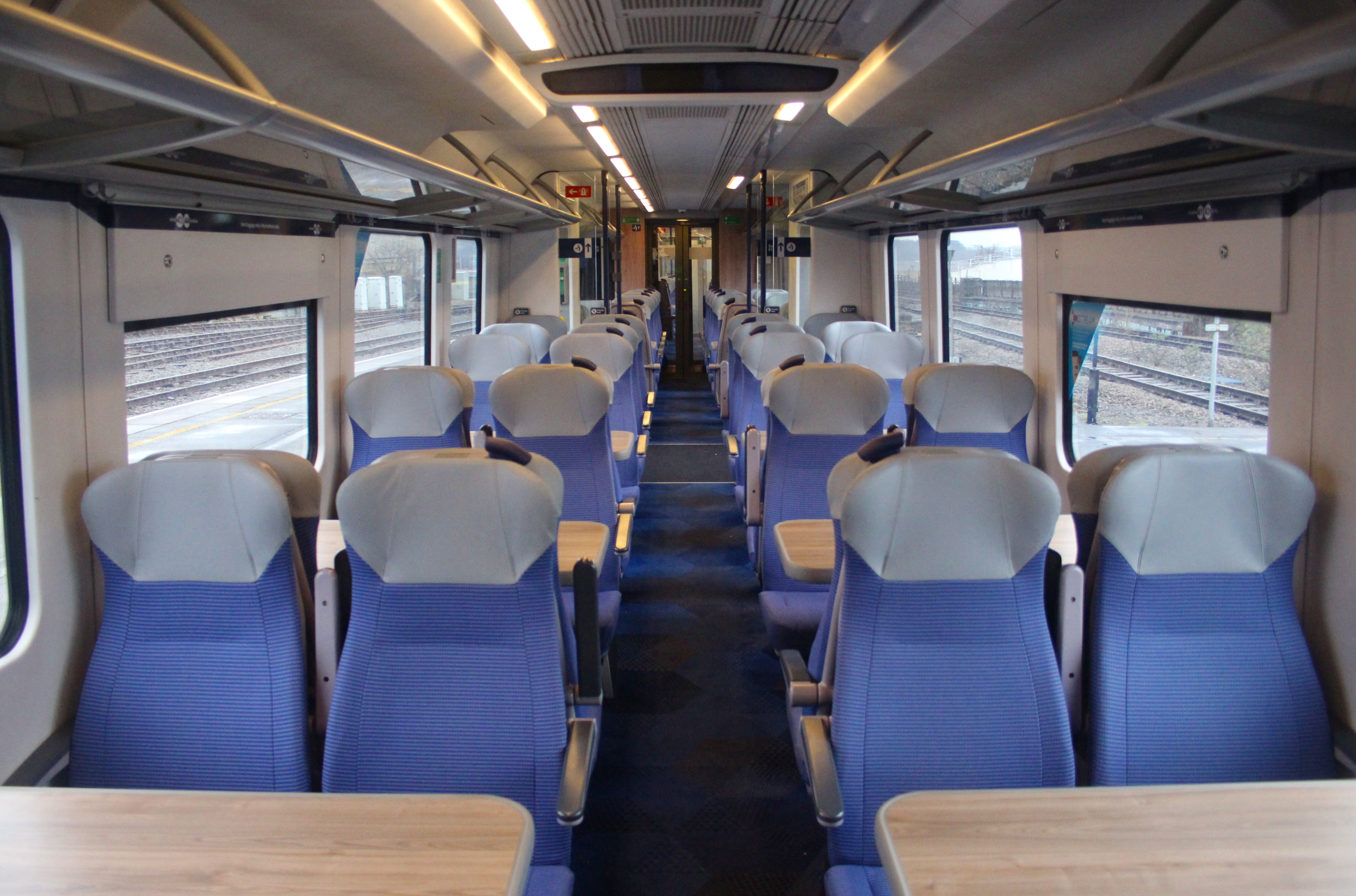
- Refurbished standard-class interior
- In service: March 2006 – present
- Manufacturer: Siemens Transportation Systems
- Built at: Krefeld, Germany
- Family name: Desiro
- Replaced: Class 158; Class 175; Mark 5A carriages
- Constructed: 2005–2006
- Entered service: 2006
- Refurbished: 2017
- Number built: 51
- Formation: 3 cars per unit: DMOSB-MOSL-DMOCLW
- Fleet numbers: 185101–185151
- Capacity: 169 seats (15 first, 154 standard) plus 12 tip-up
- Owner: Eversholt Rail Group
- Operator: TransPennine Express
- Depots: Ardwick (Manchester); Leeman Road (York)
- Lines served: TransPennine North Route; TransPennine South Route

Specifications
- Car body construction: Aluminium
- Train length: 71.276 m (233 ft 10.1 in)
- Car length: 23.763 m (77 ft 11.6 in)
- Width: 2.673 m (8 ft 9.2 in)
- Height: 3.710 m (12 ft 2.1 in)
- Floor height: 1.247 m (4 ft 1.1 in)
- Wheelbase: Bogies: 2.600 m (8 ft 6.4 in)
- Maximum speed: 100 mph (160 km/h)
- Weight: Approx. 168.5 t (165.8 long tons; 185.7 short tons)
- Axle load: 18.5 t (18.2 long tons; 20.4 short tons) max.
- Prime mover: 3 × Cummins QSK19-R (one per car)
- Engine type: Inline-6 turbo-diesel
- Displacement: 19 L (1,159 cu in) per engine
- Power output: 1,683 kW (2,257 hp) at 2100 rpm; (561 kW (752 hp) per engine)
- Transmission: Voith T 312 bre (hydrokinetic, one per car)
- Acceleration: 0.49 m/s^{2} (1.6 ft/s^{2})
- UIC classification: 2′B′+B′2′+B′2′
- Bogies: Siemens SGP SF5000
- Minimum turning radius: 120 m (393 ft 8 in)
- Braking system: Electro-pneumatic (disc) plus hydraulic retarder
- Safety systems: AWS; TPWS
- Coupling system: Dellner 12
- Multiple working: Within class
- Track gauge: 1,435 mm (4 ft 8 1/2 in) standard gauge

Notes/references
- Sourced from except where otherwise noted

The British Rail Class 185 Desiro is a class of diesel-hydraulic multiple-unit (DHMU) passenger trains built by Siemens Transportation Systems in Germany for the train operating company First TransPennine Express. They are currently operated by TransPennine Express.

A £260 million order for 51 three-car trains and associated maintenance depots was placed in 2003, and deliveries took place between 2006 and 2007.

== Background and history ==
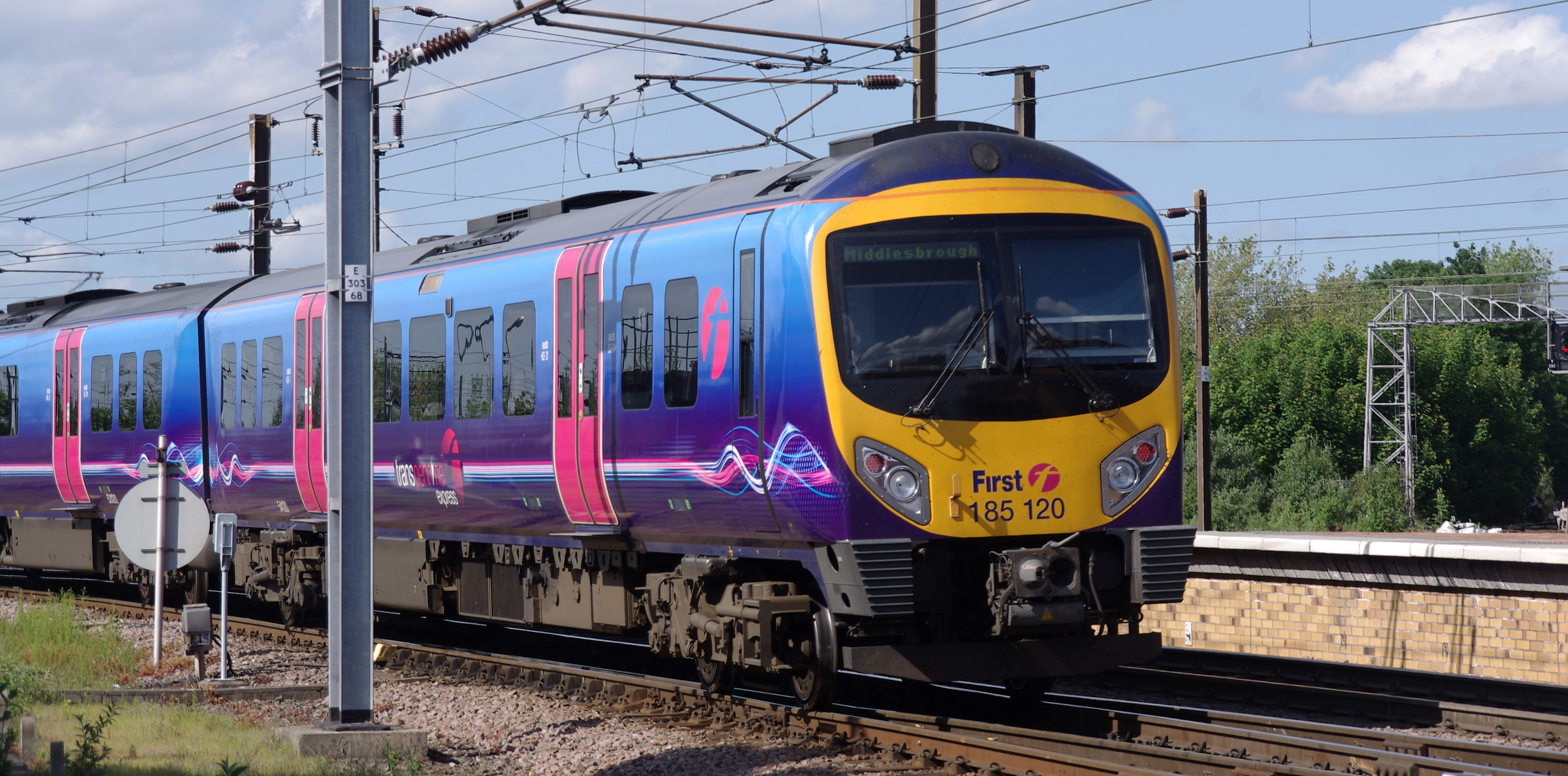
Class 185 at York in First TransPennine Express Dynamic Lines livery

In 2003, First TransPennine Express (FTPE), a consortium of FirstGroup and Keolis, was awarded the TransPennine Express (TPE) franchise. One obligation under the franchise agreement was to introduce a new fleet of diesel multiple units, capable of operating at speeds up to 100 mph (160 km/h). Also specified was air conditioning, two toilets per vehicle with one suitable for reduced-mobility passengers, gangways between individual carriages, luggage and bicycle storage space, passenger compartment CCTV, provision for wheelchair passengers, and first-class seating. Additionally, the train's acceleration was to be an improvement on the Class 158, and comparable to the Class 180. The agreement specified 168 carriages, with an initial option to reduce the carriage order by 18.

The franchise agreement also required the construction of two depots for the new rolling stock; the main depot was to be at Manchester, with a depot for stabling and maintenance at York. In addition, a depot at Cleethorpes was to be upgraded with refuelling and controlled emission toilet servicing facilities, and a train electric auxiliary supply. The franchise agreement specified a performance aim of 35,000 mi (56,000 km) per casualty, with entry into service between March 2006 (first unit) and November 2006 (entire fleet).

By August 2003, Siemens had been named as the preferred bidder for the trains. A contract for supply and maintenance of 56 trains was signed in September 2003. The new train requirement was reduced from 56 to 51 units by the Strategic Rail Authority (SRA) by 2004.

The trains were built at Siemens' plant in Uerdingen in Krefeld; the first unit began test trials at the Wildenrath test circuit in July 2005. An official launch took place at Wildenrath on 24 November 2005.

Construction of the Ardwick train depot began March 2005 and was completed in 2006. Work started on the new Leeman Road depot in York in December 2005; opening followed in May 2007. In 2006, FTPE acquired two static simulators for driver training from Corys TESS.

All 51 trains were in service by January 2007. The trains replaced two and three-car Class 158 and 175 units.

== Design ==
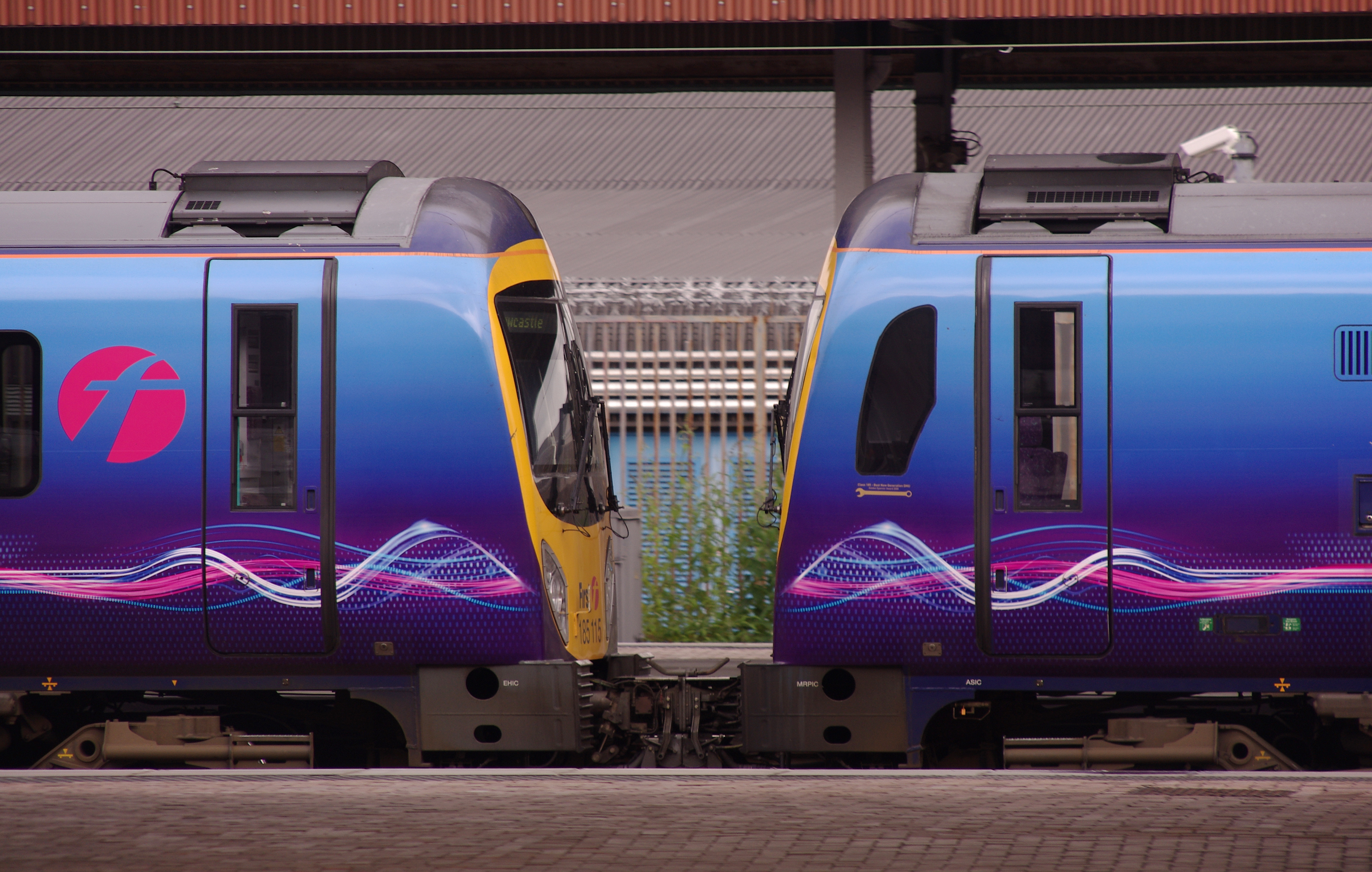
Class 185 multiple working at York

Each vehicle carries its own powertrain, driving both axles on one of the vehicle's bogies via cardan shafts. Each powertrain consists of a 561 kW (752 hp) Cummins QSK19 turbo-diesel engine driving a Voith T 312 bre three-speed hydrokinetic transmission, which in turn drives the axles via Voith SK-485 and KE-485 final drives. (Note: The same engine and transmission combination is also used for Alstom's Class 180 Coradia 1000 DMUs, and the same engine is used for Bombardier's Class 220, 221, and 222 diesel-electric multiple units.) The other bogie on each vehicle is unpowered. The engine and torque converter were frame-mounted underfloor and suspended from the car body by flexible mounts. A third underfloor module contains cooling systems and an electrical generator. The transmission includes an integrated hydraulic retarder. Cooling fans and the electrical generator are powered via a hydrostatic drive. The electrical generator provides a 400 V 50 Hz three phase electrical supply for the train, which is transformed or rectified to a 230 V 50 Hz single phase supply, a 110 V DC auxiliary supply, and a 24 V DC battery supply. Connections bridge the main 400 V AC and 110 V DC supplies across the cars of each train set. Component suppliers included Dellner (couplings), ZF (dampers), SKF (bearings), and Westinghouse Brakes (now Knorr-Bremse, braking systems).

The bogies are derivatives of Siemens' SF5000 type, and were manufactured in Graz, Austria. The design has a distance between each axle of 2.600 m (8 ft 6.4 in), with radial-arm primary suspension utilising steel coil springs with rubber elements; the secondary suspension is an air spring design supporting a bolster. Motor bogies have traction forces transmitted from bogie to frame via rods from a centre pivot. Mechanical brakes are wheel mounted discs. The Class 185 is heavier and has a stiffer suspension than the Class 158 it replaced on some routes; (Note: Simulations of Class 185 on TransPennineExpress routes predicted a small increase in rolling contact fatigue (2 mm surface crack per four years), an increase which was not determined to be necessarily significant.) On some routes – including the Hope Valley Line, York to Scarborough Line, Hull to Selby Line, and between Northallerton and Middlesbrough the Class 185 units were not permitted to operate at the same speeds as Sprinter-type DMUs; however the higher acceleration of the Class 185 units could be used to partially offset the lower speed restriction. Between Northallerton and Middlesbrough, Class 185s and Sprinters now use the same speed limits.

As delivered each train consisted of three cars; one end car (DMOSB) had 64 standard class seats in [2+2] arrangement with a mixture of facing seats with tables and airline style arrangements, as well as luggage and bicycle facilities; the middle car (MOSL) had 72 standard class seats also in a mixture of arrangements in [2+2] formation, and incorporated a standard toilet; the other end car (DMOCLW) had a further 18 standard class seats, and 15 [2+1] arrangement first class seats, plus a wheelchair space, and a reduced mobility access toilet. Toilets were supplied by Driessen, seats by Grammer and Fainsa, and air conditioning by Air International Transit.

=== Eco-Mode ===
The trains were designed for the steep hills encountered on the TransPennine routes; as a result the units had a high installed power, unnecessary for most of the train's route sections, leading to low fuel efficiency relative to other DMUs. In mid-2007, Siemens and First TransPennine Express began a programme, named 'Eco-Mode', to improve the efficiency of the fleet. The project involved generating driver information giving route advice allowing more efficient driving, including information on when it was feasible to shut down a diesel engine, leaving the train 'cruising' on two of the three engines. Additionally fuel consumption was reduced by performing shunting using only one engine, and automating complete engine shutdown at depots. Initial changes in working practice resulted in a 7% fuel saving. Furthermore, as the engines are idling less and thus operating less (engine hours reduced by two hours a day per train), their service life may be extended by 15%.

== Operations ==
=== TransPennine Express ===
The 51 three-car Class 185 units, together with nine two-car Class 170 units, replaced the Class 158 (North and South TransPennine Express routes), Class 175 (routes between Manchester Airport and Blackpool / Cumbria). To free up stock for services between Manchester Airport and destinations in Scotland when First TransPennine Express first took over these routes, the frequency of the Manchester Airport to Windermere route was reduced from December 2007.

In 2014, the introduction of ten electric Class 350 units on services between Manchester and Scotland allowed the displacement of Class 170 and some Class 185 units to provide additional capacity on FTPE's network. Two (originally four) Class 185 units were loaned to Arriva Rail North from April 2016 until May 2019.

Following the introduction of the new Nova fleet in 2019 and 2020, it was originally planned and expected that 22 Class 185 units would return to Eversholt Rail Group. However, in September 2019, TransPennine Express announced that it would only be returning 15, with the remaining units being required to operate diversionary services during upgrades to the TransPennine route. In June 2020, TransPennine Express confirmed that the return of 15 sets would be postponed until further notice.

==== Overcrowding and passenger feedback ====
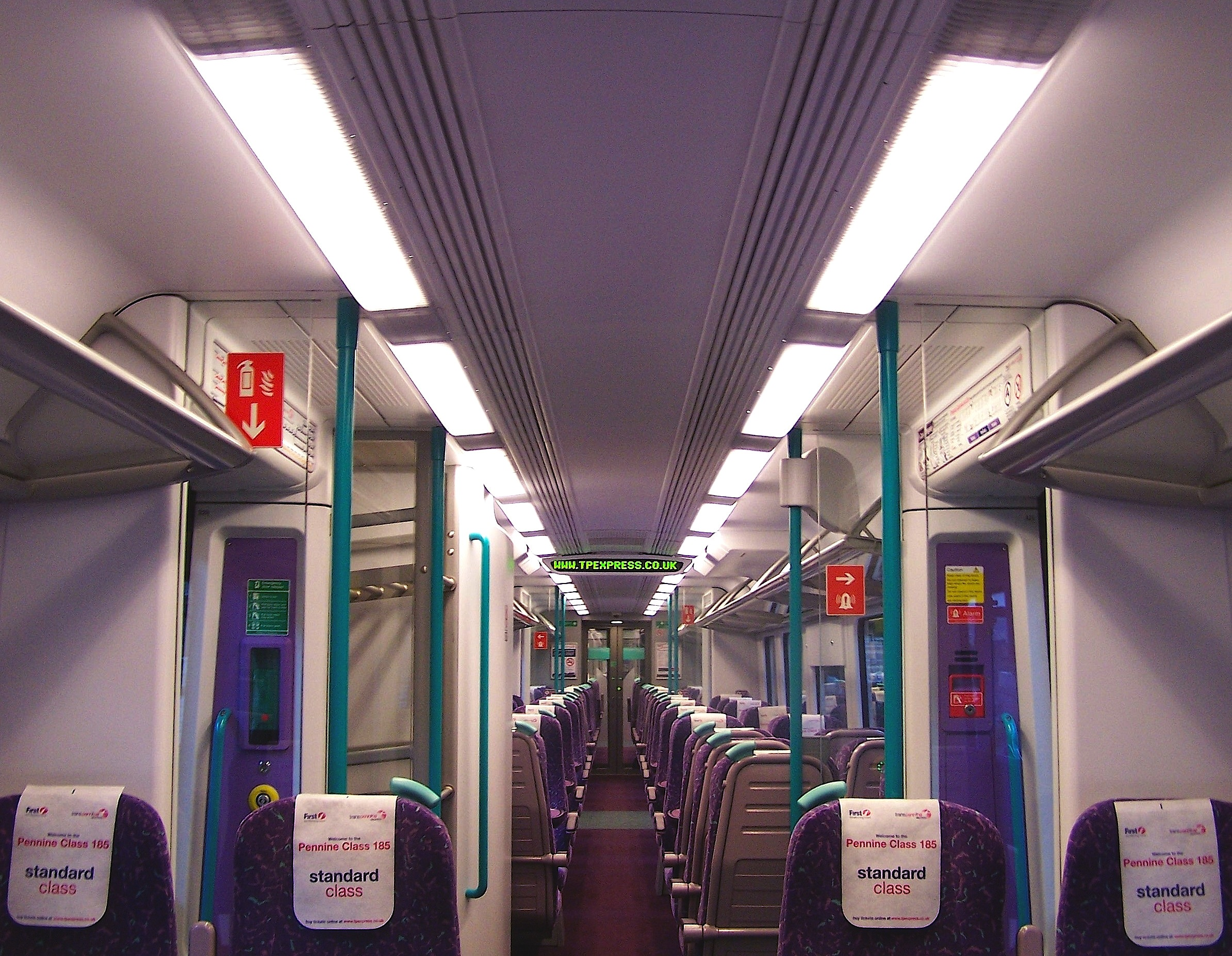
The original Class 185 standard class interior.

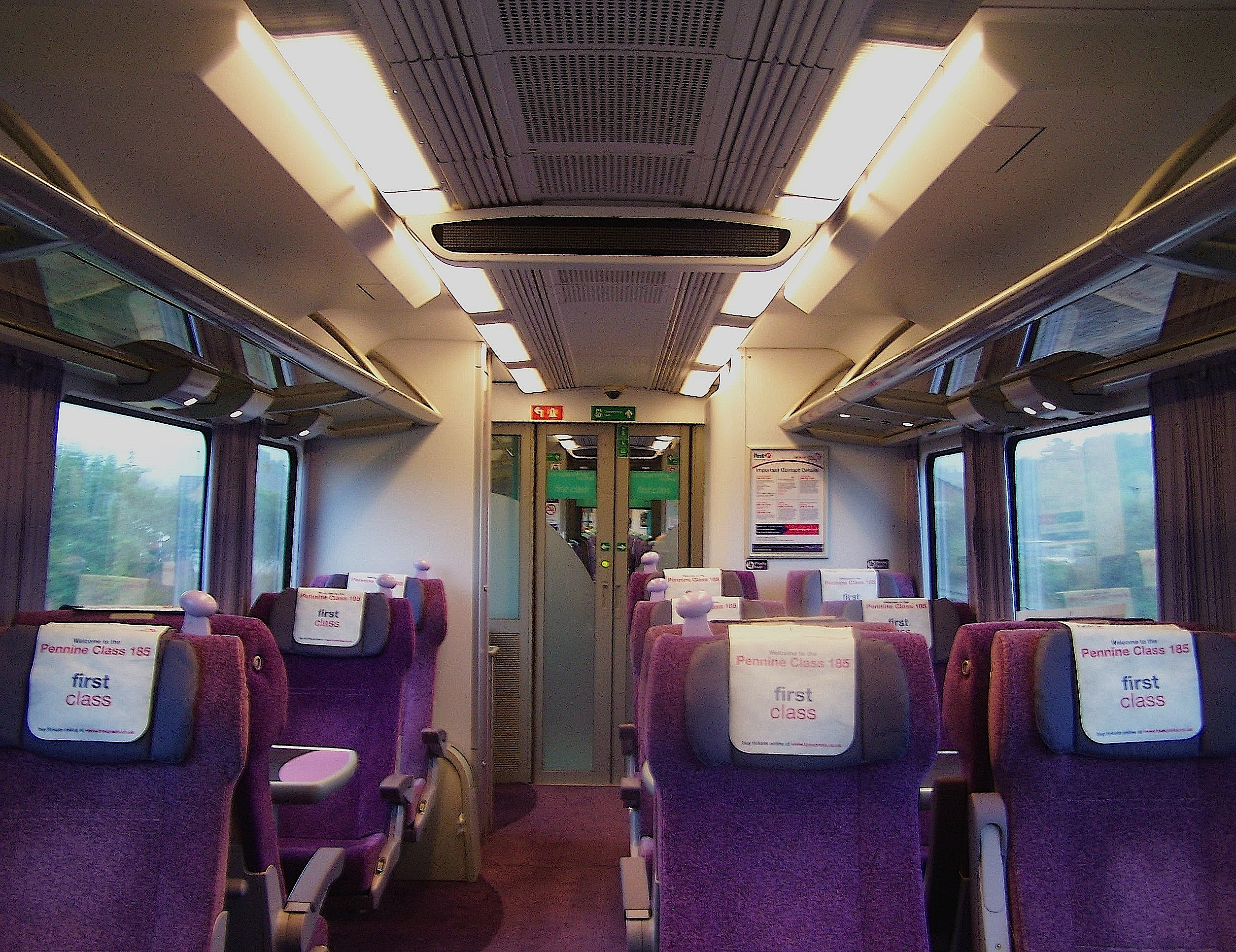
The original first class section of a Class 185

In 2007, Passenger Focus published a user survey on the Class 185. Satisfaction ratings of around 80% were given for many standard aspects of a train journey, such as availability of seats, seat comfort, ease of egression, cleanliness. Passengers gave satisfaction ratings of around only 70% on standing space availability. Lower averaged satisfaction ratings (~50%) were given for wheelchair space, bicycle space and for the inability to shield the sun, as well as overall design, and position and number of bins. Frequent travellers had a low level of satisfaction with toilet cleanliness. The report concluded that overall users liked the new trains, but identified issues relating to peak crowding, particularly on evening peaks.

By 2007, increased use of some of the First TransPennine Express services (Sheffield, Manchester and Leeds) caused the operator to start lobbying the SRA for a fourth car to the three-car sets to increase capacity; however, the service overall was subsidised, presenting a cost barrier to further rolling stock leasing. By 2008, many of the peak-time trains operated by Class 185s on First TransPennine Express services were suffering chronic overcrowding.

==== Refurbishment ====
In June 2017, TransPennine Express began refurbishing Class 185s as part of its franchise commitments. The first unit was completed in July 2017, entering service within the same week. The refurbished trains include new seats throughout the train (including leather in First Class), standard plug and USB sockets at every pair of seats, new decor, refitted toilets, and LED lighting throughout. The refurbishment was completed in 2018.

== Fleet details ==
Class	Operator	Quantity	Year built	Cars per unit	Unit nos.
185	TransPennine Express	51	2005–2006	3	185101–185151

=== Andy's Man Club Livery ===
As part of a collaboration between TransPennine Express and Andy's Man Club - a mental health charity for men's mental health, unit 185111 received a new livery at the cab ends of the train. The design features a black background, the "ok" hand gesture, as well as a white bolt of lightning, followed by quotes surrounding the charity.

=== Named units ===
Unit 185113 is named Hull Paragon 175.

=== Liveries ===
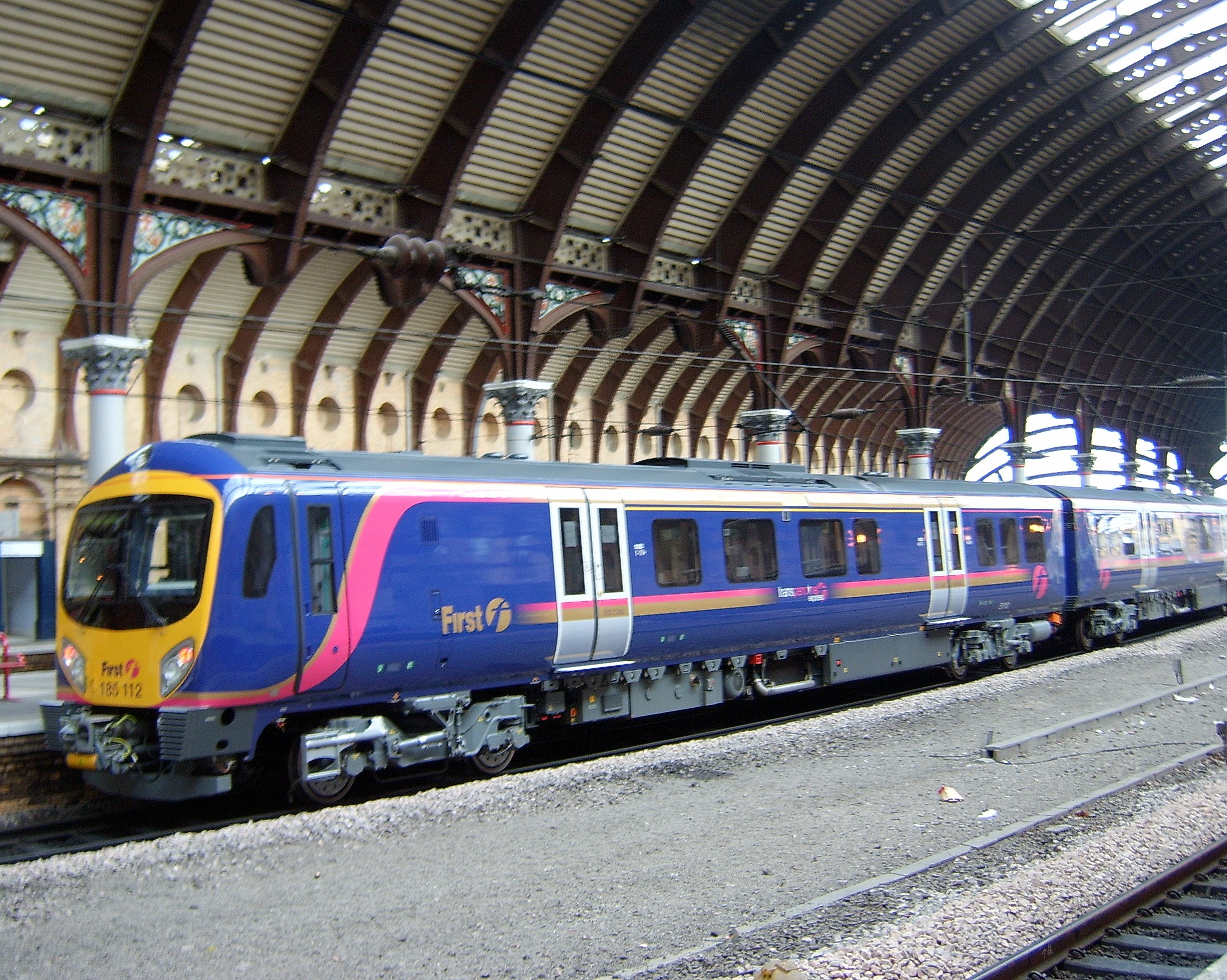
The Class 185's first livery known as the "Barbie" livery, as seen in 2006. This was used during testing only.

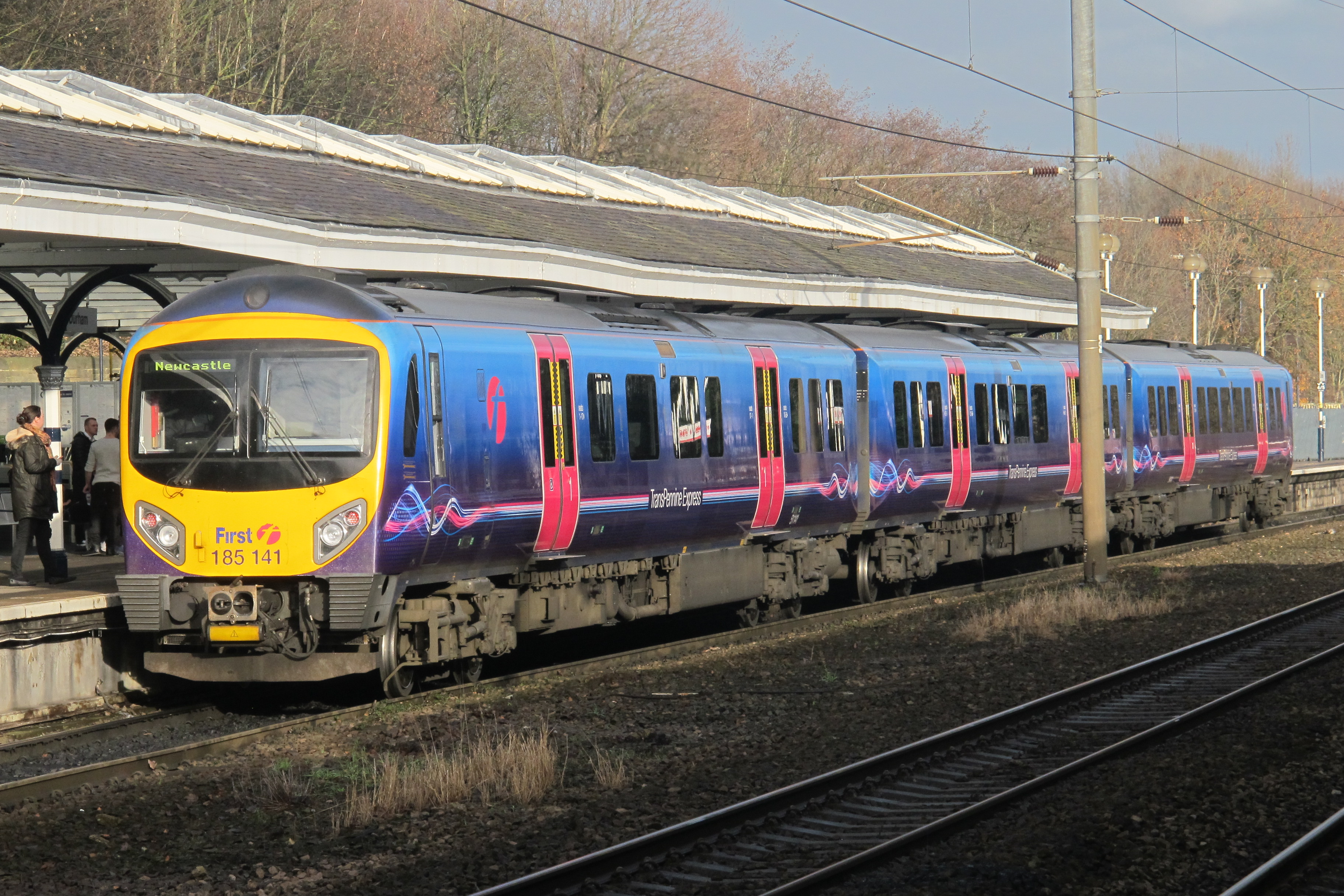
The second livery carried by the Class 185, First Group's "Dynamic Lines". This livery was carried from 2006 to 2016.

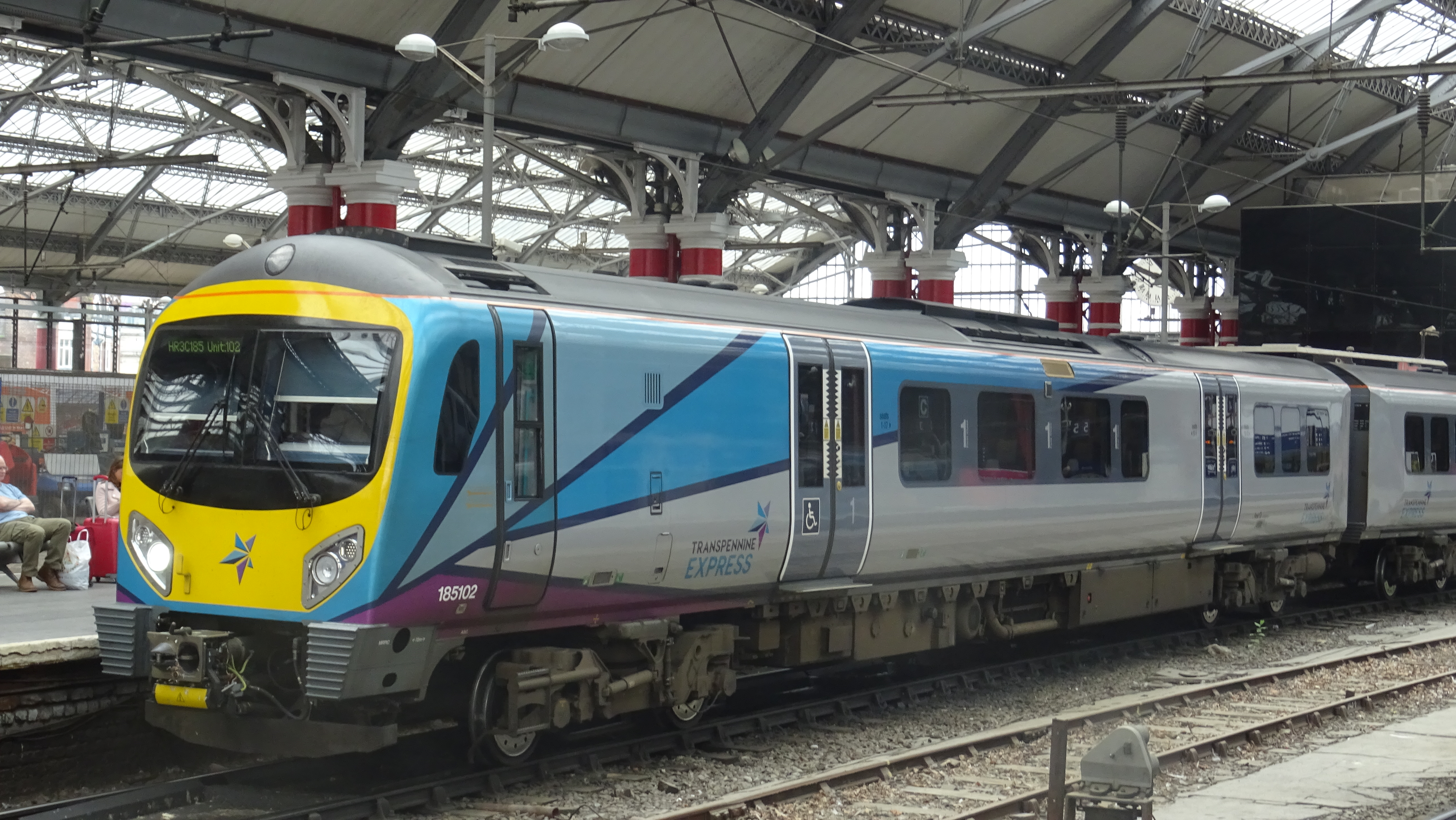
The current livery carried by the class, seen at Liverpool Lime Street in 2017.
