= TransPennine Express =

British state-owned train operating company

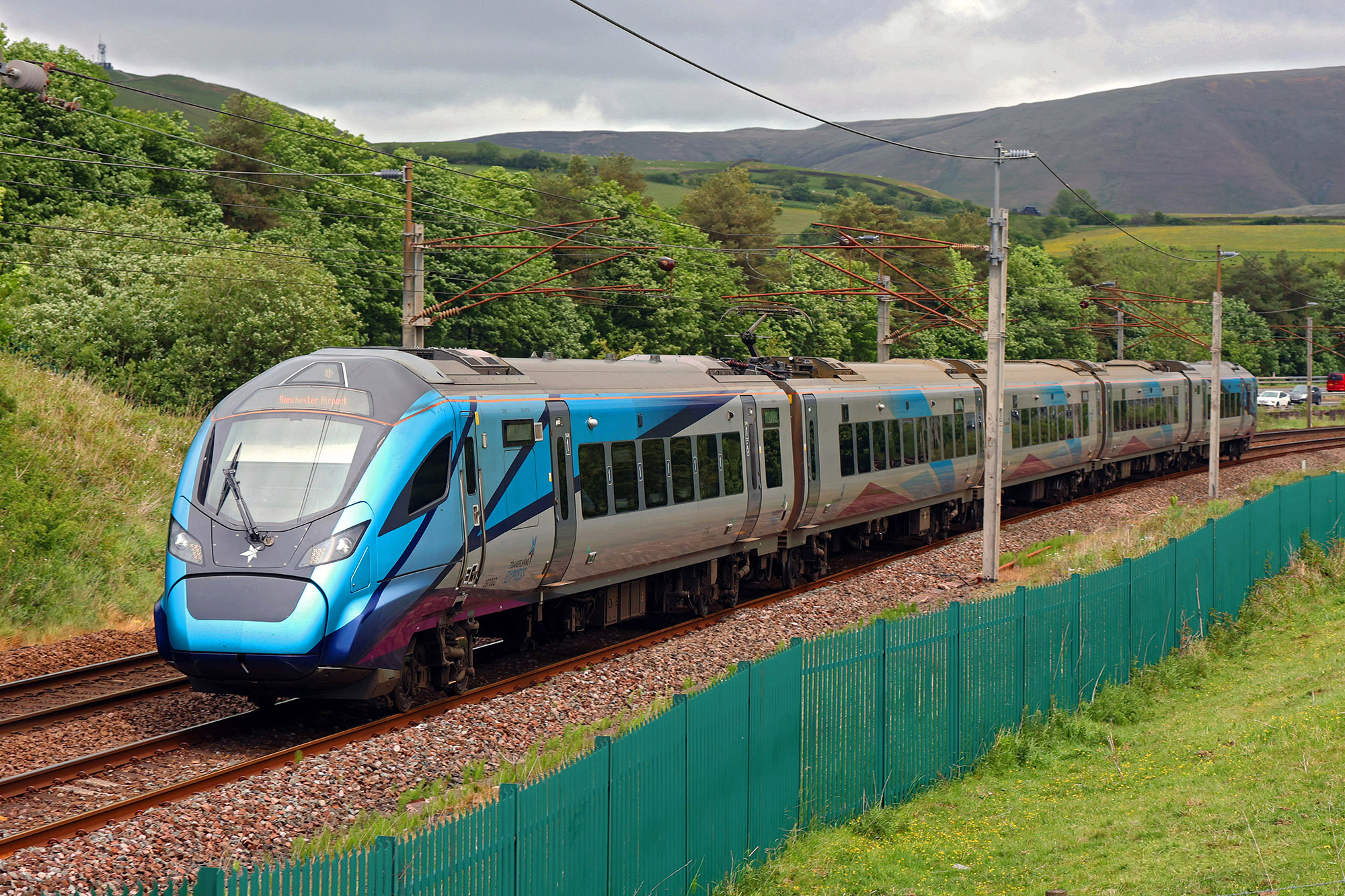
- A Class 397 Nova 2 unit on the West Coast Main Line

Overview
- Franchises: TransPennine Express; 28 May 2023 – present
- Main routes: North East England; North West England; Scotland; Yorkshire & the Humber
- Fleet: Class 185 Desiro; Class 397 Nova 2; Class 802 Nova 1
- Stations operated: 19
- Parent company: DfT Operator
- Headquarters: Manchester
- Reporting mark: TP
- Predecessor: TransPennine Express (2016–2023)

Other
- Website: www.tpexpress.co.uk
System map

TransPennine Trains Limited, trading as TransPennine Express (TPE), is a state-owned British train operating company that runs regional and inter-city rail services between the major cities and towns of Northern England and Scotland.

The company, which is owned by DfT Operator, has been the holder of the TransPennine Express franchise since May 2023. It was established following poor performance by the previous privately owned operator, also called TransPennine Express, from whom it carried over rolling stock, passenger services, and branding.

== History ==
During the early 2020s, the incumbent operator of the TransPennine Express franchise, FirstGroup's TransPennine Express, suffered severe disruption of its services, which was largely attributable to events such as the COVID-19 pandemic and the 2022–2023 United Kingdom railway strikes. On 11 May 2023, following numerous cancellations and service disruptions, the Department for Transport (DfT) announced that First Group's contract to operate the franchise would not be renewed and, as a result, TPE would cease operations on 28 May 2023. In its place, operations were taken over by operator of last resort (OLR) TransPennine Trains.

=== Performance ===
The performance of TransPennine Trains has been criticised, being amongst the least punctual train operators during 2023, with an on-time performance of 47.7% between April 2023 and March 2024, which resulted in 311,070 delay compensation claims. It had a cancellation rate that exceeded one in eight trains during summer 2023. In October 2023, the operator announced that it would be temporarily cutting services from 320 services per day to 300, reducing off-peak trains between the cities of Leeds and Manchester, with the goal of improving both punctuality and reliability. TransPennine Trains' managing director, Chris Jackson, stated that this move allowed for greater driver training and helped to stabilise the timetable, and that the operator would reintroduce the full timetable by December 2024 at the latest. Shortly thereafter, the company released a new timetable comparison tool to aid customers in interpreting the service levels and changes enacted.

=== Industrial action ===
During early December 2023, TransPennine Trains' services were disrupted by industrial action as the train drivers belonging to the Associated Society of Locomotive Engineers and Firemen (ASLEF) trade union implemented a ban on overtime and a series of rolling strikes. That same month, the operator reinstated direct train services between Castleford and York for the first time in 50 years; this service change was facilitated by recent infrastructure improvement work undertaken as part of the Transpennine Route Upgrade (TRU).

== Services ==
TransPennine Trains took over all services operated by its predecessor, FirstGroup-owned TransPennine Express, on 28 May 2023.

The TransPennine Express routes are subdivided into three operations:

- North Route, which includes all routes that pass through the core section between Manchester station group and Leeds;
- Anglo-Scottish Route, which consists of services on the West Coast Main Line;
- South Route, which includes services running on the Hope Valley Line and the South Humberside Main Line.

As of June 2025, the following services operate off-peak, seven days a week:

Route	tph	Calling at
North Route
Manchester Piccadilly to York via Wakefield Kirkgate	1	Stalybridge; Mossley; Greenfield; Marsden; Slaithwaite; Huddersfield; Deighton; Mirfield; Wakefield Kirkgate; Normanton; Castleford
Manchester Airport to Redcar Central	1	Manchester Piccadilly; Manchester Oxford Road; Manchester Victoria; Huddersfield; Dewsbury; Leeds; York; Thirsk; Northallerton; Yarm; Eaglescliffe; Thornaby; Middlesbrough; 3 trains a day extend to/from Redcar Central to Saltburn
Manchester Victoria to Scarborough	1	Huddersfield; Dewsbury; Leeds; York; Malton; Seamer
Liverpool Lime Street to Hull Paragon	1	Lea Green; Manchester Victoria; Stalybridge; Huddersfield; Leeds; Selby; Brough
Liverpool Lime Street to Newcastle	1	Newton-le-Willows; Manchester Victoria; Huddersfield; Leeds; York; Darlington; Durham; Chester-le-Street
Newcastle to Edinburgh Waverley	1 tp2h	Morpeth; Alnmouth; Berwick-upon-Tweed; Reston; Dunbar; East Linton
South Route
Liverpool Lime Street to Cleethorpes	1	Liverpool South Parkway; Warrington Central; Birchwood; Irlam; Urmston; Manchester Oxford Road; Manchester Piccadilly; Stockport; Sheffield; Meadowhall; Doncaster; Scunthorpe; Barnetby; Habrough; Grimsby Town
Anglo-Scottish Route
Manchester Airport to Glasgow Central	1 tp2h	Manchester Piccadilly; Manchester Oxford Road; Bolton (Note: Served to pick up only northbound and set down only southbound); Preston; Lancaster; Oxenholme Lake District; Penrith North Lakes; Carlisle; Lockerbie; Carstairs (1 train per day northbound Mon-Sat, southbound Sun); Motherwell; Alternates with services to Edinburgh Waverley, see below.
Manchester Airport to Edinburgh Waverley	1 tp2h	Manchester Piccadilly; Manchester Oxford Road; Bolton; Preston; Lancaster; Oxenholme Lake District; Penrith North Lakes; Carlisle; Lockerbie; Haymarket (Note: Served to pick up only southbound and set down only northbound); Alternates with services to Glasgow Central, see above.
Liverpool Lime Street to Glasgow Central	4 tpd	St Helens Central; Wigan North Western; Preston; Lancaster; Oxenholme Lake District; Carlisle; Lockerbie; Motherwell (2 trains per day); 1 train per day operates between Liverpool Lime Street and Oxenholme Lake District.

=== Peak hours ===
Following the December 2024 timetable change, the following changes were made to services during peak hours:

- A Northern Trains service between Huddersfield and Castleford was transferred to TransPennine Express. This was converted to a peak hour extension of the Manchester Piccadilly to Huddersfield service to extend to York calling additionally at Deighton, Mirfield, Wakefield Kirkgate, and Normanton. This service run hourly throughout the day.
- Additional hourly services were added between Manchester Piccadilly and Leeds and some Manchester Piccadilly to Huddersfield services are extended to Leeds. These services have varying stopping patterns ranging from stopping at all stations to only stopping at Huddersfield. These services allow for more express services between Manchester and Leeds as well as ensuring two trains per hour to stations between Manchester and Leeds during peak times.

== Routes ==
North Route

Times shown are best times from
Manchester Piccadilly/Manchester Victoria.

South Route

Times shown are best times from
Liverpool Lime Street.

Anglo-Scottish Route

Times shown are best times from
Liverpool Lime Street/Manchester Airport.

== Rolling stock ==
Upon commencing operations, TransPennine Express inherited the fleet of the previous franchisee. Various minor refurbishment programmes were quickly enacted. The oldest trains in the fleet, the Class 185 multiple-units, were subject to an interior deep clean, which included the replacement of all carpets. Furthermore, all of the seats were recovered and improvements to the onboard toilet facilities were made. By late 2023, TransPennine Express had also formulated its new trains programme, a longer-term initiative in which the operator stated its intention to introduce new technologies to support decarbonisation, the acceleration of efforts to cascade and eventually entirely remove diesel trains from its fleet, and enact a new long-term depot and maintenance strategy.

During September 2023, following a radical review by the DfT, it was announced that TransPennine Express's Nova 3 train sets, comprising Class 68 diesel locomotives hauling rakes of Mark 5A carriages, had been scheduled for withdrawal. This rolling stock was relatively new, yet had been beset by multiple challenges including technical issues, driver training, a downturn in passengers due to COVID-19, and noise complaints from neighbours of the Scarborough maintenance facility, which resulted in a persistently low utilisation rate being achieved. The DfT believes that the withdrawal of the Nova 3 sets can be adequately offset by maximising the utilisation of other trains, such as 19 Class 802 bi-mode train sets and the Class 185 DMUs. Chris Jackson, managing director of TransPennine Express, has advocated for the need to simplify the operator's fleet, resource planning, and overall business strategy.

=== Current fleet ===
Family	Class	Image	Traction	Top speed	Number Carriages	Routes operated	Built
Family	Class	Image	Traction	mph km/h	Number Carriages	Routes operated	Built
Siemens Desiro	185		DMU	100 160	51 3	North Route: Manchester Airport – Redcar Central; Manchester Piccadilly – York via Castleford; Manchester Piccadilly – Huddersfield; Huddersfield – Leeds; Liverpool Lime Street – Hull; Manchester Victoria – Scarborough; South Route: Liverpool Lime Street – Cleethorpes; Manchester Airport – Cleethorpes; Anglo-Scottish Route: Manchester Airport – Oxenholme Lake District (one return journey)	2005–06
Hitachi AT300	802 Nova 1		BMU	125 200	19 5	North Route: Liverpool Lime Street – Newcastle; Liverpool Lime Street – Hull; Newcastle – Edinburgh Waverley; Manchester Victoria – Scarborough; Anglo-Scottish Route: Manchester Airport – Edinburgh Waverley via Preston	2017–19
CAF Civity	397 Nova 2		EMU	125 200	12 5	Anglo-Scottish Route: Manchester Airport – Glasgow Central or Edinburgh Waverley via Preston; Liverpool Lime Street – Glasgow Central via Preston	2017–19
CAF Civity	397 Nova 2		EMU	125 200	TPE Class 397 with pantograph		

=== Future fleet ===
In September 2026, Alstom was awarded the tender for 29 battery-electric multiple units. These trains will start to be constructed from 2028 with the first unit entering service in late 2032. They will have a top speed of 110 miles per hour (180km/h). These units will feature level boarding for improved accessibility and will have five carriages.

=== Past fleet ===
Locomotive hauled stock
Family	Class	Image	Type	Top speed		Number	Carriages	Routes operated	Built	Withdrawn
Family	Class	Image	Type	mph	km/h	Number	Carriages	Routes operated	Built	Withdrawn
Stadler UKLight	68		Diesel locomotive	100	160	14	5	North Route (Until 2023): Manchester Piccadilly – Scarborough; York – Scarborough; (Until July 2023): Liverpool Lime Street – Cleethorpes	2016–17	2023 Stored for almost 3 years, then re-entered service with Chiltern Railways on 26 January 2026
CAF	Mark 5A Nova 3		Coach	125	200	52	5	North Route (Until 2023): Manchester Piccadilly – Scarborough; York – Scarborough; (Until July 2023): Liverpool Lime Street – Cleethorpes	2017–18	2023 Stored for almost 3 years, then re-entered service with Chiltern Railways on 26 January 2026
CAF	Mark 5A Nova 3		Driving trailer	125	200	14	5	North Route (Until 2023): Manchester Piccadilly – Scarborough; York – Scarborough; (Until July 2023): Liverpool Lime Street – Cleethorpes	2017–18	2023 Stored for almost 3 years, then re-entered service with Chiltern Railways on 26 January 2026

Preceded by TransPennine Express (2016–2023)	Operator of TransPennine Express contract 2023–present	Succeeded by Incumbent
