= Arriva Rail North =

Train operating company in Northern England

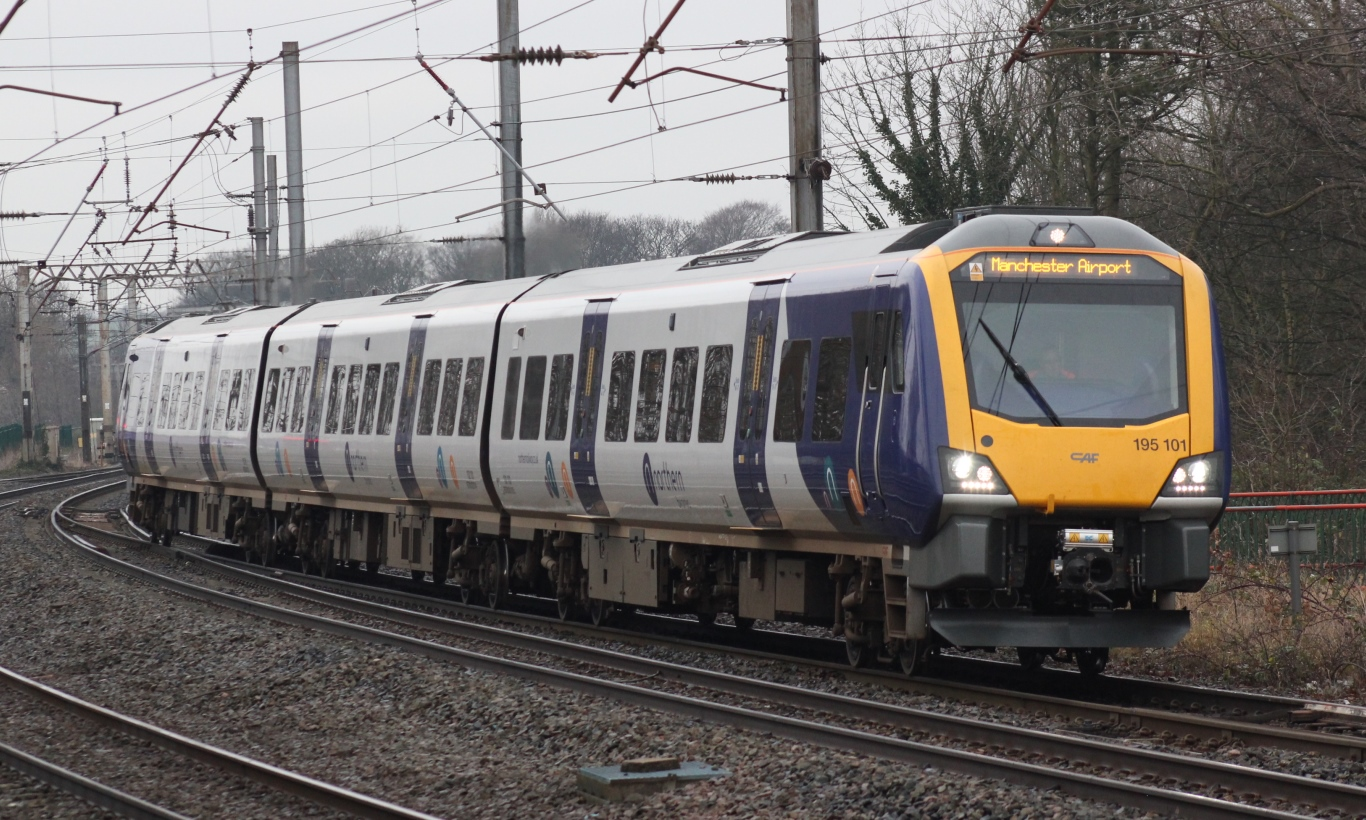
- An Arriva Rail North Class 195 arriving at Lancaster

Overview
- Franchises: Northern; 1 April 2016 – 29 February 2020
- Main regions: North West; North East; Yorkshire and the Humber
- Other regions: East Midlands; Staffordshire
- Fleet: 386 units (Note: One unit was leased from Grand Central)
- Stations called at: 528
- Stations operated: 476
- Parent company: Arriva
- Predecessor: Northern Rail
- Successor: Northern Trains

Other
- Website: www.northernrailway.co.uk

Arriva Rail North Limited, branded as Northern by Arriva, was a British train operating company which began operating the Northern franchise on 1 April 2016 and inherited units from the previous operator Northern Rail. A subsidiary of Arriva UK Trains, Northern was the largest train franchise in the United Kingdom in terms of the size of the network and the number of weekly services run. Its trains called at 528 stations, about a quarter of all stations in the country; of these stations 476 were operated by Northern. On 1 March 2020, Arriva Rail North Limited ceased to operate and all operations were handed to HM Government's Operator of last resort.

During the preceding Northern Rail franchise passenger numbers increased from 73 million to 97 million between 2004 and 2016 and as a result the new franchise was tendered on a growth basis, allowing for a £500 million investment in 101 new-built trains: the diesel Class 195 and electric Class 331. Introduced into service in July 2019, these were the first new-build trains for the Northern franchise since the introduction of the Class 333 in 2001, with further orders possible if the new units encouraged passenger growth and improved passenger satisfaction. The new rolling stock allowed for the first Pacer trains to be retired in August 2019.

Since the franchise began in April 2016, it had been beset by worsening punctuality, perceived poor customer service, frequent industrial action by staff, and delays in introducing new rolling stock. The franchise was badly affected by the May 2018 timetable fallout and punctuality struggled to recover. The franchise was scheduled to run until 2025 and had an option for an additional year, which was dependent on performance.

The future of the franchise was first reviewed by the Department for Transport (DfT) in July 2019 deeming frequent weekend cancellations due to insufficient staff to be "unacceptable". It also voiced concerns about declining passenger numbers despite a 10% increase in timetabled services since the beginning of the franchise in 2016, and an unplanned subsidy increase from £286 million to £404 million following the May 2018 timetable fallout.

Conversely, Arriva contended that there had been "collective system inability", citing Network Rail's inadequate timetabling to absorb delays and the DfT's unwillingness to proceed with improving infrastructure which were part of the Northern franchise bid prospectus in 2014, such as two new "through" platforms at Manchester Piccadilly; these would have eased congestion through the Castlefield corridor (Note: The Castlefield Corridor is a heavily-used section of track in Manchester city centre from Deansgate to Manchester Piccadilly station. Approximately 15 trains per hour passed through this section of track which mostly consisted of only two lines. Proposals to upgrade Manchester Oxford Road station to better manage flow of trains and two new platforms at Manchester Piccadilly were expected to be delivered when the Northern franchise was tendered in 2015 - however these proposals were shelved in 2018. As of 2020, no infrastructure upgrades to support growth had occurred and Network Rail declared the corridor 'congested' in September 2019.) and enabled the planned increase in services over the course of the franchise.

On 29 January 2020, it was announced that the Northern franchise would end early on 1 March 2020 - marking the first time a franchise has been removed from a train operating company due to poor performance since Connex South Eastern in 2003. From this date onwards, the franchise became directly operated by the DfT under the brand name Northern Trains with an objective to "stabilise performance and restore reliability for passengers".

== History ==
In August 2014, the Department for Transport announced that Abellio, Arriva and Govia had been shortlisted to bid for the next Northern franchise. The franchise was awarded to Arriva in December 2015.

In May 2016, the Competition and Markets Authority launched an investigation into the transport department's decision to award the Northern network to Arriva. Arriva operated the CrossCountry franchise and owned many bus companies in the Northern trains operating area in which 'a significant overlap occur(ed) without competition from other service providers.

=== Penalty fares ===
As part of the new Franchise Agreement agreed in 2016, the Department for Transport required the introduction of a penalty fare scheme across 60% of the Northern network by the end of 2019 and across the entire network by the end of 2022. The scheme aimed to reduce ticketless travel to less than 4.3% by March 2020 and 3.2% by March 2025. In April 2018, a penalty fare scheme under the Railways (Penalty Fares) Regulations 2018 (SI 2018/366) commenced to encourage passengers to purchase a ticket before boarding trains.

As ticket machines at Arriva Rail North managed stations did not accept cash, a 'Promise to Pay' notice system (similar to the Permit to Travel ticketing system) was in operation. Customers who wished to purchase a ticket at an unstaffed station of origin (i.e. either a closed, or no ticket office) with cash were required to collect a 'Promise to Pay' notice prior to boarding from a ticket machine. These notices could then be exchanged with the on-board conductor or with a member of railway staff at the destination station for a paid ticket. Section 6 of the Railways (Penalty Fares) Regulations 2018 also covered a number of scenarios that prohibited penalty fares being issued such 'no facilities in operation for the sale of a travel ticket for that passenger's journey'.

=== May 2018 timetable recast ===
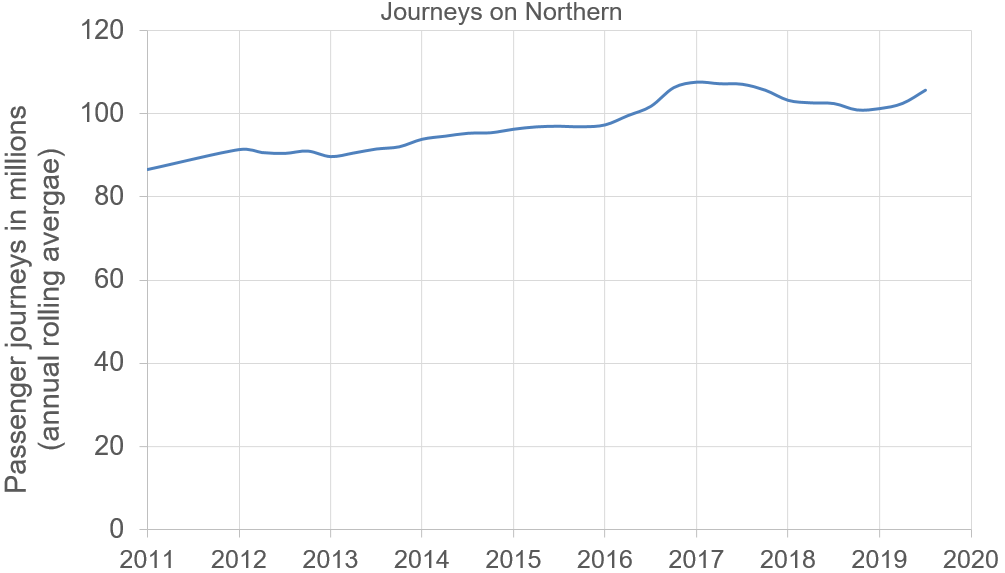
Passenger journeys on Northern Rail, 2010–11 to Q2 2019–20 on Arriva Rail North (in millions, annual rolling average)

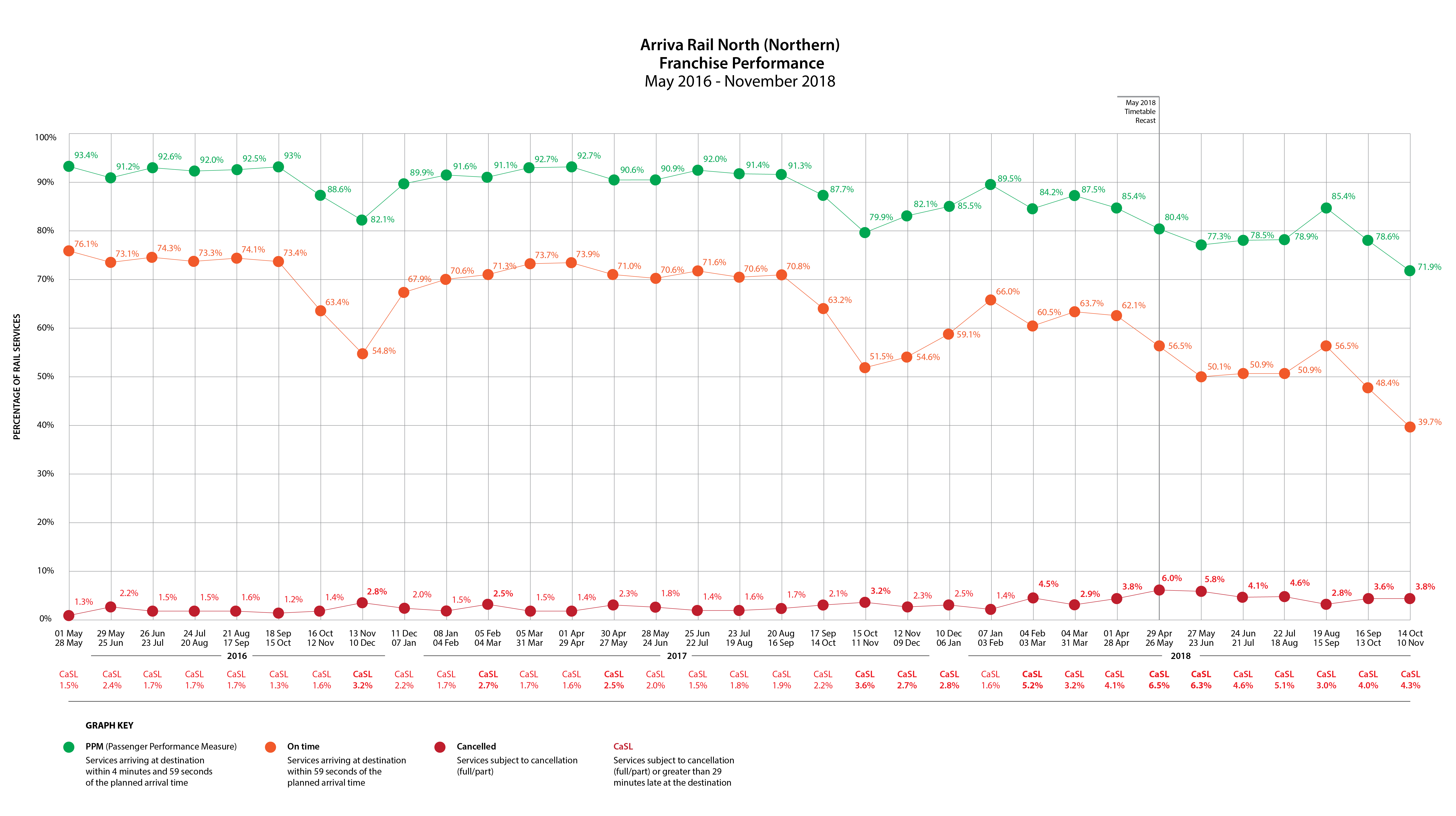
Arriva Rail North performance from commencement of franchise in April 2016 to November 2018. Graph generated from published period performance data by Arriva Rail North.

The franchise was widely criticised for implementing a new timetable in May 2018 which resulted in widespread delays and cancellations. Network Rail and Northern announced an independent inquiry to learn lessons and identify route alterations in readiness for the next timetable change in December 2018. In an attempt to counter operational problems, Northern implemented an emergency timetable on 4 June 2018 – it stemmed some delays and cancellations but was still problematic compared with performance before the timetable change.

Punctuality was particularly bad in the North West due to the delay in the Blackpool–Preston electrification scheme, and the number of trains per hour through Manchester increased, with more trains using the Ordsall Chord which became operational in December 2017. Network Rail only informed train operating companies in January 2018 that the electrification scheme would be delayed until November; Northern had planned for the scheme to be complete as scheduled by May 2018 (it had already been postponed from Autumn 2017) and had trained drivers to operate new routes with electric rolling stock. Consequently, an alternative timetable had to be drafted up, and many train drivers were not sufficiently trained to drive the existing diesel rolling stock; this resulted in widespread cancellations. Furthermore, the additional services through the Manchester corridor resulted in increased congestion, and this had a knock-on effect. Performance statistics published by the Office of Rail and Road in October 2018 showed that from April to June 2018, the franchise recorded the lowest PPM – measured by train service departing within 5 minutes of its scheduled time – of any quarter since punctuality records began on the Northern Rail franchise in 2009.

Performance later in 2018 continued to be poor, with many passengers protesting and a reduced service on Saturdays due to industrial action. In October 2018, it was announced that Manchester Oxford Road station, the busiest station managed by Arriva Rail North with over 8 million passengers, was the most delayed station in the United Kingdom in 2018 – this was attributed to the chaos following the May 2018 timetable. Between 14 October and 10 November 2018, Northern recorded the worst monthly performance on record, with more trains late than on time. Less than 40% of services arrived on time (defined as services arriving within 59 seconds of the planned arrival time) and only 71.9% departed within 5 minutes of the scheduled departure time.

By November 2018, Arriva were re-evaluating their future involvement in the franchise due to a combination of declining passenger numbers as a result of the chaotic May 2018 timetable change and increasing compensation claims as a result of falling punctuality. Both had pushed the franchise into financial losses and faced a £282 million government subsidy shortfall which was due to be passed onto the franchise. Since the franchise commenced in April 2016, and despite an increase of 1,500 more weekly services transferred to Northern's operational remit, Northern had achieved no growth in passenger numbers. Between April and June 2018, the franchise suffered a 2.4% decline in passenger numbers compared with the previous year. Of the 22 train operating companies in the United Kingdom to record a fall in passengers, Northern were one of only three franchises to record a year-on-year drop in passenger numbers in 2017–18.

Statistics published in December 2018 showed that between April 2017 and March 2018, many Arriva Rail North managed stations recorded a drop in passengers – this period did not include the May 2018 timetable change or the increased Saturday strikes by conductors. The Mayor of Greater Manchester, Andy Burnham, also reported that the failing railways in the region were resulting in increased congestion on the roads and Metrolink system, as passengers were abandoning the rail service as it had become less reliable since May 2018. To counter continuing poor performance and encourage improved punctuality, the window for which passengers could claim compensation for delayed services was reduced from 30 minutes to 15 minutes from 17 December 2018.

Minor changes were implemented in the December 2018 timetable change. However Northern said they did not expect a reliable service to be implemented until the May 2019 timetable change; it was expected that by this time there would be new rolling stock in service with the Class 195 and Class 331, newly electrified lines operational which would alleviate the shortage of diesel rolling stock in the Northern fleet and most notably operational flaws with the May 2018 timetable ironed out as part of better optimised timetable in May 2019.

=== May 2019 and new trains ===
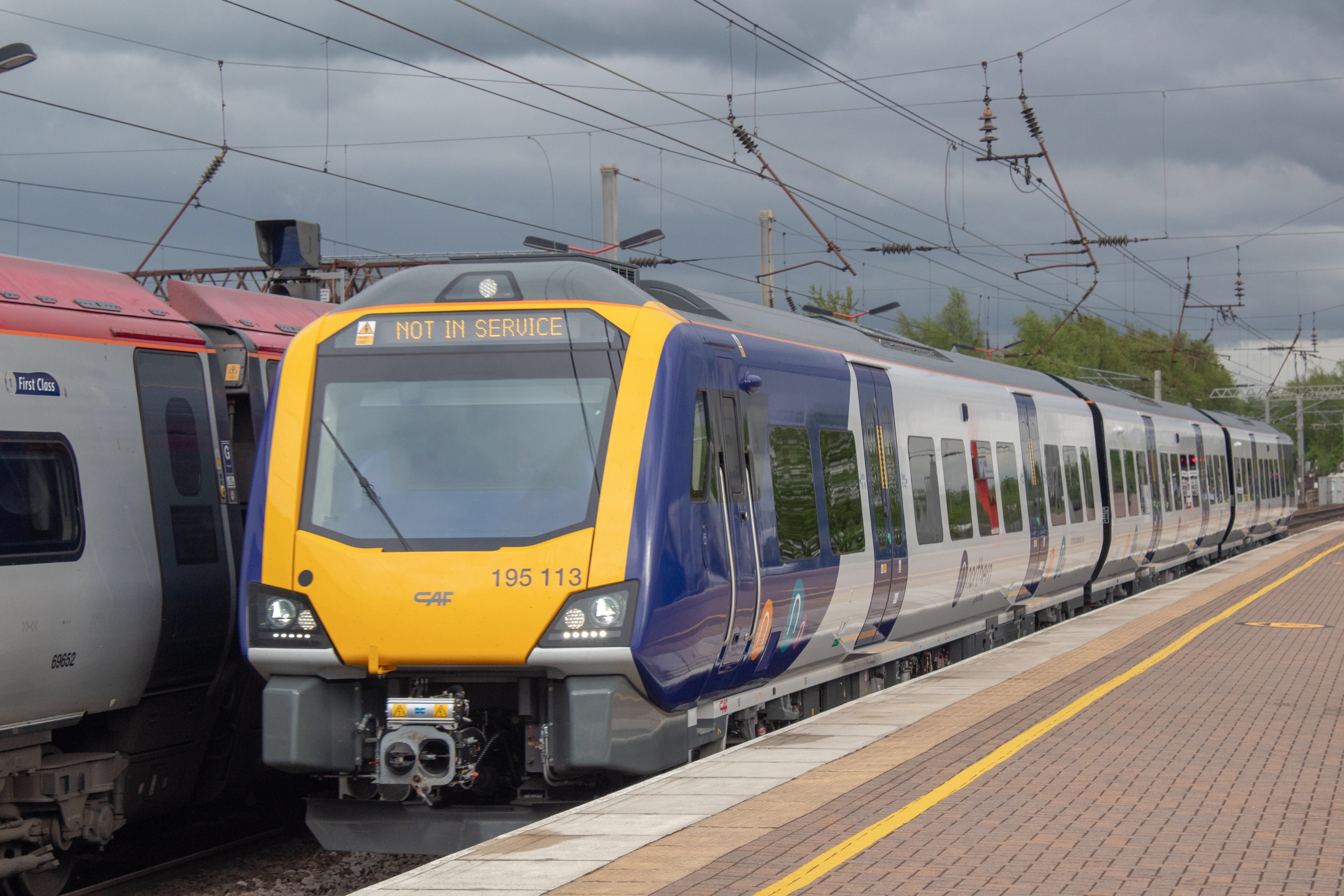
The first Class 195 and Class 331 units were introduced in July 2019

In May 2019, further Northern Connect services were introduced, namely the Chester to Leeds service and the revised Manchester Airport to Barrow/Windermere service, to run via Wigan North Western. Northern also introduced an hourly service from Hull to Scarborough, doubling the service frequency on the Bridlington–Scarborough section of the line.

However, the May 2019 timetable did not include some of the improvements included in the original franchise agreement, such as a half-hourly service from Greenbank, Northwich, Knutsford and Altrincham to Stockport and Manchester; the additional Macclesfield and Poynton to Manchester and Blackpool service; or enhanced Sunday services. The Transport Secretary, Chris Grayling, responded that "both Northern and Network Rail feel the additional paths cannot be accommodated without adversely affecting the reliability of other services on the network".

In June 2019, the operator of last resort (managed by the Department for Transport) conducted due diligence into the franchise believing the both operational and financial performance to be "unsustainable". The Mayor of Greater Manchester, Andy Burnham, overtly demanded that the franchise be terminated as Northern had not delivered legally-binding franchise requirements as agreed in 2016 when the franchise commenced – citing disproportionate number of cancelled services, inability to deliver a full Sunday service due to a lack of drivers and failure to deliver new services.

On 1 July 2019, the first nine units – seven Class 195 units and two Class 331 units – were introduced with a further 93 units to be introduced over the following 12 months. The initial roll-out commenced on three routes: Manchester Airport to Liverpool Lime Street and Barrow/Windermere and Leeds to Doncaster.

=== Demise ===
The franchise made a £21 million profit in 2016–17 and an £11.7 million profit in 2017–18 – a figure which does not include the fallout from the May 2018 timetable chaos. At the start of the franchise, it was agreed that there would be a taxpayer subsidy of £275 million in its first year and £260 million in its third year – although Northern had received slightly more due to promised infrastructure improvements which the government had failed to deliver such as platforms 15 and 16 at Manchester Piccadilly which would have created a new path for the franchise to Manchester Airport. This subsidy was intended to fall sharply in 2020 to £221 million and by the end of the franchise in 2025 it would only receive £39 million.

The fall in subsidy over the franchise was likely to push Arriva into a loss; The Times reported in summer 2019 that the Department of Transport viewed the franchise as "unsustainable" and were readying an Operator of Last Resort (OLR) in the event the franchise collapsed. The government and franchisee adopted a strategy of investing in new trains to attract new passengers to gradually reduce the subsidy over a long-term period – however the franchise has struggled to increase passenger numbers, a challenge exacerbated by the fallout from the chaotic May 2018 timetable change.

It was confirmed in October 2019 that the Department of Transport were formulating a stabilisation strategy for the franchise which could entail supervising its workings whilst letting Arriva operate the day-to-day services – an arrangement akin to special measures. Grant Shapps, the Transport Secretary, was critical of regular Sunday cancellations given Arriva had committed to legally adhere to ensuring minimum service requirements as part of the franchise agreement.

Following this announcement, Arriva UK Trains expressed its regret and had adopted the view that 'collective system inability' had rendered the 2015 franchise agreement invalid. They referenced infrastructure upgrades which were reneged upon by the Department for Transport and unworkable timetabling by Network Rail – illustrated by consistent delays on the certain routes.

In November 2019, it was reported that Arriva were a target of a takeover but that the Northern franchise would not be included in such a deal. In the same month, RAIL magazine cautioned against an Operator of Last Resort (OLR), arguing that problems ran far deeper than just Northern and OLR would not be a panacea – citing Network Rail implementing a timetable with little resilience against delays, the Department of Transport (DfT) not releasing funding for infrastructure upgrades and interfering local mayors.

In January 2020, Shapps spoke again to criticise Arriva's operation of the Northern franchise and suggested that the Government may step in to revoke Arriva's franchise agreement, calling the service "completely unacceptable".

On 29 January 2020, it was announced that Arriva would be stripped of the franchise from 1 March 2020, with the franchise to be operated by the government's operator of last resort.

Responding to the early termination of the franchise, Arriva UK Trains expressed its regret at the lack of investment in infrastructure to support the increased number of services since 2016 and apologised for the service provided. They expressed sentiments that despite the challenges encountered over the four years, much of the existing rolling stock had been modernised and the addition of new rolling stock, notably in six-coach formations on the busiest Arriva Rail North routes, provided a solid platform for the Northern franchise going forward.

== Services ==
Arriva Rail North took over all the services operated by Northern Rail on 1 April 2016 and on the same date, services between Manchester Airport and Blackpool North, Manchester Airport and Barrow in Furness and Oxenholme to Windermere from First TransPennine Express.

Arriva Rail North took over responsibility for all the stations managed by Northern Rail, as well as Arnside, Barrow-in-Furness, Birchwood, Burneside, Carnforth, Grange-over-Sands, Kendal, Staveley, Ulverston, Warrington Central and Windermere from First TransPennine Express. Arriva Rail North would staff some previously unstaffed stations. The first stations to be staffed would be Baildon and Ben Rhydding, both in West Yorkshire.

Arriva Rail North had committed to introducing free Wi-Fi on trains, and new ticketing options including the ability for customers to print their own tickets. Arriva Rail North would provide new services across the North of England.

The Cleethorpes to Barton-on-Humber service was due to be transferred to East Midlands Railway in August 2019 but would not transfer until December 2019 . The transfer would include Barrow Haven, Barton upon Humber, Goxhill, Great Coates, Grimsby Docks, Habrough, Healing, New Clee, New Holland, Stallingborough, Thornton Abbey and Ulceby stations.

On 1 July 2016, the business was divided into four regions, each headed up by a regional director:

- Central – regional director based in Manchester
- East – regional director based in Leeds
- North East – regional director based in Newcastle upon Tyne
- West – regional director based in Preston

=== Northern Connect ===
By December 2019, Arriva Rail North planned to operate a network of twelve Northern Connect inter-urban express services – a franchise requirement. Most of these would be operated by brand-new Class 195 Civity diesel multiple units and Class 331 Civity electric multiple units, whilst the Middlesbrough to Carlisle via Newcastle route would be operated by refurbished Class 158 units. Electrification of the line between Oxenholme and Windermere was cancelled by the Government in 2017, so the Manchester Airport to Windermere route would be operated initially by Class 769 Flex trains instead, with Class 195 Civity trains taking over by the end of 2019.

Places that would be served by Northern Connect routes include Bradford, Chester, Halifax, Leeds, Liverpool, Manchester, Middlesbrough, Nottingham, Newcastle, Preston, Sheffield, Barnsley, Lincoln, Wakefield, Wigan and York.

== Rolling stock ==
Arriva Rail North inherited the rolling stock operated by Northern Rail, namely Class 142, 144, 150, 153, 155, 156 and 158 diesel multiple units and Class 319, 321, 322, 323 and 333 electric multiple units. To operate services transferred from the TransPennine Express franchise, four Class 185 units were sublet from that franchise to Northern, with this later reducing to two units. As of the May 2019 timetable change, these sublet units were returned to TransPennine Express. To provide additional peak time capacity on the Calder Valley Line, one Class 180 unit was sublet from Grand Central to Arriva Rail North per weekday.

Class 37/4 locomotives and Mark 2 carriages were hired from Direct Rail Services for Cumbrian Coast Line services until December 2018.

The first Class 142 train, 142005, was withdrawn from service on 12 August 2019, with the remaining Class 142s withdrawn in November 2020 by Northern Trains. At the end of the franchise, 63 units had been withdrawn from service.

=== Fleet at end of franchise ===
Class	Image	Type	Top speed		Number	Carriages	Routes	Built
Class	Image	Type	mph	km/h	Number	Carriages	Routes	Built
Shunting locomotive
08		Shunter	15	24	1	N/A	Stock movements	1952–1962
Diesel multiple units
142 Pacer		DMU	75	121	16	2	Local and commuter services across the North	1985–1987
144 Pacer		DMU	75	121	13	2	Local and commuter services in Yorkshire	1986–1987
144 Pacer		DMU	75	121	10	3	Local and commuter services in Yorkshire	1986–1987
150/1 & 150/2 Sprinter		DMU	75	121	78	2	Local and commuter services across the North	1985–1987
153 Super Sprinter		DMU	75	121	20	1	Local and commuter services across the North Also used to boost capacity on peak time services	1987–1988
155 Super Sprinter		DMU	75	121	7	2	Manchester Victoria–Leeds; Local and commuter services across Yorkshire	1987–1988
156 Super Sprinter		DMU	75	121	47	2	Local, commuter and regional services across the North	1987–1989
158/0 & 158/9 Express Sprinter		DMU	90	140	45	2	Regional express and commuter services in West Yorkshire; Northern Connect services in the North East; Halifax-Hull; Chester-Leeds via Manchester Victoria; Wigan Wallgate-Leeds via Manchester Victoria; Leeds-Carlisle; Leeds-York via Garforth; Leeds-Morecambe	1989–1992
158/0 & 158/9 Express Sprinter		DMU	90	140	8	3	Regional express and commuter services in West Yorkshire; Northern Connect services in the North East; Halifax-Hull; Chester-Leeds via Manchester Victoria; Wigan Wallgate-Leeds via Manchester Victoria; Leeds-Carlisle; Leeds-York via Garforth; Leeds-Morecambe	1989–1992
170/4 Turbostar		DMU	100	161	16	3	Leeds–York via Harrogate; Sheffield-Hull/Bridlington; Hull-Scarborough	2003–2005
180 Adelante		DMU	125	201	1	5	Calder Valley Line peak time services (Note: One morning peak time service from Hebden Bridge to Leeds, and one return trip in the evening peak, from Monday to Friday) (Unit was subleased from Grand Central)	2000–2001
195/0 & 195/1 Civity		DMU	100	161	25 (16 in service)	2	Liverpool Lime Street–Wilmslow/Manchester Airport via Warrington Central; Manchester Airport–Barrow-in-Furness/Windermere via Wigan North Western; Oxenholme–Windermere; Chester-Leeds via Manchester Victoria; Barrow in Furness-Preston; Blackpool North-York; Leeds-Nottingham; Leeds-Lincoln via Sheffield	2018–2019
195/0 & 195/1 Civity		DMU	100	161	33 (26 in service)	3	Liverpool Lime Street–Wilmslow/Manchester Airport via Warrington Central; Manchester Airport–Barrow-in-Furness/Windermere via Wigan North Western; Oxenholme–Windermere; Chester-Leeds via Manchester Victoria; Barrow in Furness-Preston; Blackpool North-York; Leeds-Nottingham; Leeds-Lincoln via Sheffield	2018–2019
Electric multiple units		DMU						
319/3		EMU	100	161	19	4	Electrified commuter services in Greater Manchester, Merseyside and Lancashire	
321/9		EMU	100	161	3	4	Electrified commuter services in West Yorkshire	1991
322		EMU	100	161	5	4	Electrified commuter services in West Yorkshire	1990
323		EMU	90	140	17	3	Electrified commuter services in and around Greater Manchester and Merseyside	1992–1995
331/0 & 331/1 Civity		EMU	100	161	31 (19 in service)	3	Leeds–Doncaster; Liverpool Lime Street–Blackpool North; Blackpool North-Manchester Airport via Chorley; Blackpool North-Hazel Grove via Chorley; Liverpool Lime Street–Wigan North Western; Liverpool Lime Street–Crewe via Manchester Piccadilly; Liverpool Lime Street–Warrington Bank Quay; Crewe-Manchester Piccadilly via Stockport	2018–2019
331/0 & 331/1 Civity		EMU	100	161	12	4	Leeds–Doncaster; Liverpool Lime Street–Blackpool North; Blackpool North-Manchester Airport via Chorley; Blackpool North-Hazel Grove via Chorley; Liverpool Lime Street–Wigan North Western; Liverpool Lime Street–Crewe via Manchester Piccadilly; Liverpool Lime Street–Warrington Bank Quay; Crewe-Manchester Piccadilly via Stockport	2018–2019
333		EMU	100	161	16	4	Electrified commuter services in West Yorkshire	2000–2003

=== Past fleet ===
Former train types operated by Arriva Rail North include:

Class	Image	Type	Top speed		Number	Carriages	Notes	Built	Withdrawn
Class	Image	Type	mph	km/h	Number	Carriages	Notes	Built	Withdrawn
Locomotive hauled stock
37		Loco	80	130	2	–	Replaced by Class 156 units	1960–1965	2018
68		Loco	100	160	2	–	Replaced by Class 156 units	2013–2017	2018
Mark 2		Coach	100	160	6	–	Replaced by Class 156 units	1972–1975	2018
Mark 2		DBSO	100	160	2	–	Replaced by Class 156 units	1979	2018
Diesel multiple units
142 Pacer		DMU	75	121	63	2	Replaced by Class 150, Class 156, Class 158 and Class 170 units.	1985–1987	2019–2020
153 Super Sprinter		DMU	75	121	3	1	Replaced by Class 150, Class 156, Class 158 and Class 170 units.	1987–1988	2019–2020
185 Desiro		DMU	100	161	4	3	Replaced by Class 195 and Class 331 units. (Four subleased from TransPennine Express to operate Manchester to Blackpool / Cumbria services)	2005–2006	2019
Electric multiple units
319/3		EMU	100	161	20 (Note: Eight Class 319/4 units were converted to Class 769 as part of the Northern franchise.)	4		1987–1990	2018–2020

== Driver-controlled operation ==
The Department of Transport and Arriva Rail North had specified that the franchise must ensure that at least 50% of the aggregate Train Mileage of Passenger Services provided in each reporting period was operated as driver-controlled operation (DCO).

DCO is defined as "operation of a train by a driver alone without the need for a conductor (or any other Franchise Employee)." The franchise further specified that "Where ... a Passenger Service is operated as Driver Controlled Operation the Franchisee shall ... plan for an additional Franchise Employee (that is, in addition to the driver) to be present on such Passenger Service."

The RMT Union were unhappy about this change, as roles undertaken by guards would instead be undertaken by drivers (such as releasing the doors once the train has stopped at a station). Although Northern had said they would be willing to guarantee that a second member of staff would be on board, the use of DCO could theoretically make it possible to run a train without a guard, and as a result, the union called industrial action over the change.

On 28 November 2018, Transport for the North announced that it did not support the removal of an additional franchise employee on Northern services, was willing to consider all options that would facilitate an agreement, and urged both Northern and the RMT Union to return to negotiations, suspending strike action. On 29 November, RMT announced that it had offered to suspend industrial action under the condition that trains would never run without a guard on the train, however, on 30 November, the union confirmed that it would continue industrial action as planned.

On 6 February 2019, the RMT announced that following "a guarantee of a conductor on all trains, including the new fleet, for the duration of the current franchise" it had suspended further industrial action on Arriva Rail North, bringing an end to consecutive strikes on Saturdays since 25 August 2018.

== Criticism ==
Arriva Rail North also had issues staffing Sunday trains, partly due to no agreement between the driver's union ASLEF and Arriva Rail North for drivers in the former First North Western franchise area to work Sundays. This led to both 'planned cancellations' (announced the day before) and short notice cancellations due to staff shortages for several months. There were also a significant number of cancellations on weekdays and Saturdays due to staffing issues, especially during school holidays. This led to local figures, including Greater Manchester mayor Andy Burnham, calling for Arriva to be stripped of the Northern franchise.

== Depots ==
Arriva Rail North's fleet was maintained at Allerton, Botanic Gardens, Heaton, Newton Heath and Neville Hill depots.

In 2017, a new stabling depot opened at Blackburn King Street, with space for up to thirty diesel multiple units.

A new depot opened in Wigan in December 2019, with space for 32 trains. The depot has been adapted from a freight yard at Springs Branch railway sidings in Ince-in-Makerfield and has cost £46 million to convert.

Arriva Rail North had depots for its train crew at Barrow-in-Furness, Blackburn, Blackpool North, Buxton, Carlisle, Darlington (drivers), Doncaster, Harrogate, Huddersfield, Hull, Liverpool Lime Street, Leeds, Manchester Piccadilly, Manchester Victoria, Middlesbrough (conductors), Newcastle, Sheffield, Skipton, Wigan Wallgate, Workington and York.

Depot	Picture	Allocation	Nearest station
Allerton TMD		150, 156, 195, 319, 323, 331	Liverpool South Parkway
Blackburn King Street TMD		142, 150, 156	Blackburn
Botanic Gardens TMD		08	Hull Paragon
Heaton TMD		142, 144, 156, 158	Newcastle
Newton Heath TMD		142, 150, 153, 156, 195	Manchester Victoria
Neville Hill TMD		153, 155, 158, 170, 321, 322, 331, 333	Leeds
Wigan Springs Branch TMD		158, 195, 319, 331	Wigan North Western

== Notes ==
Preceded by Northern Rail; Northern Rail franchise	Operator of Northern franchise 2016–2020	Succeeded by Northern Trains
