= Burneside railway station =

Railway station in Cumbria, England

Coordinates: 54.355°N 2.766°W

Burneside
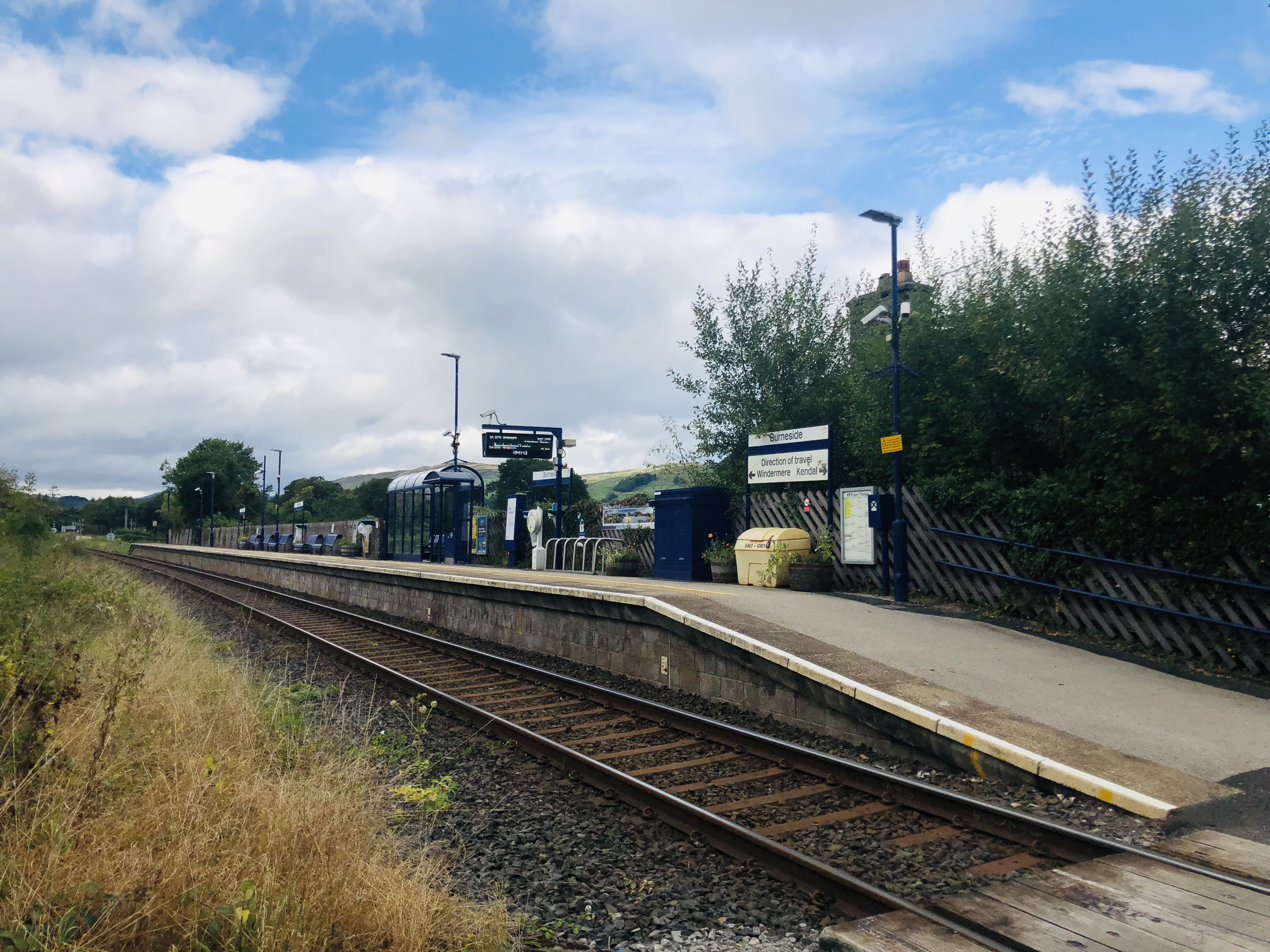
- The platform at Burneside, looking north-west

General information
- Location: Burneside, Westmorland and Furness; England
- Grid reference: SD502957
- Manager: Northern Trains
- Platforms: 1

Other information
- Station code: BUD
- Classification: DfT category F2

Passengers
- 2021/22: ▲17,618
- 2022/23: ▼16,918
- 2023/24: ▲22,240
- 2024/25: ▲28,192
- 2025/26: ▲39,590
Location
Notes
- Passenger statistics from the Office of Rail and Road

Burneside railway station serves the village of Burneside, in Cumbria, England. The station is a stop on the Windermere Branch Line between Oxenholme Lake District and Windermere. The station is owned by Network Rail and is operated by Northern Trains, which provides all passenger train services. Until December 2012, Burneside was a request stop.

== History ==
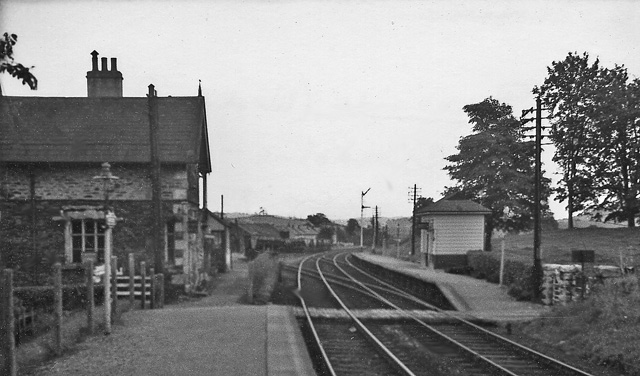
A view to the south-east towards Oxenholme, in 1966

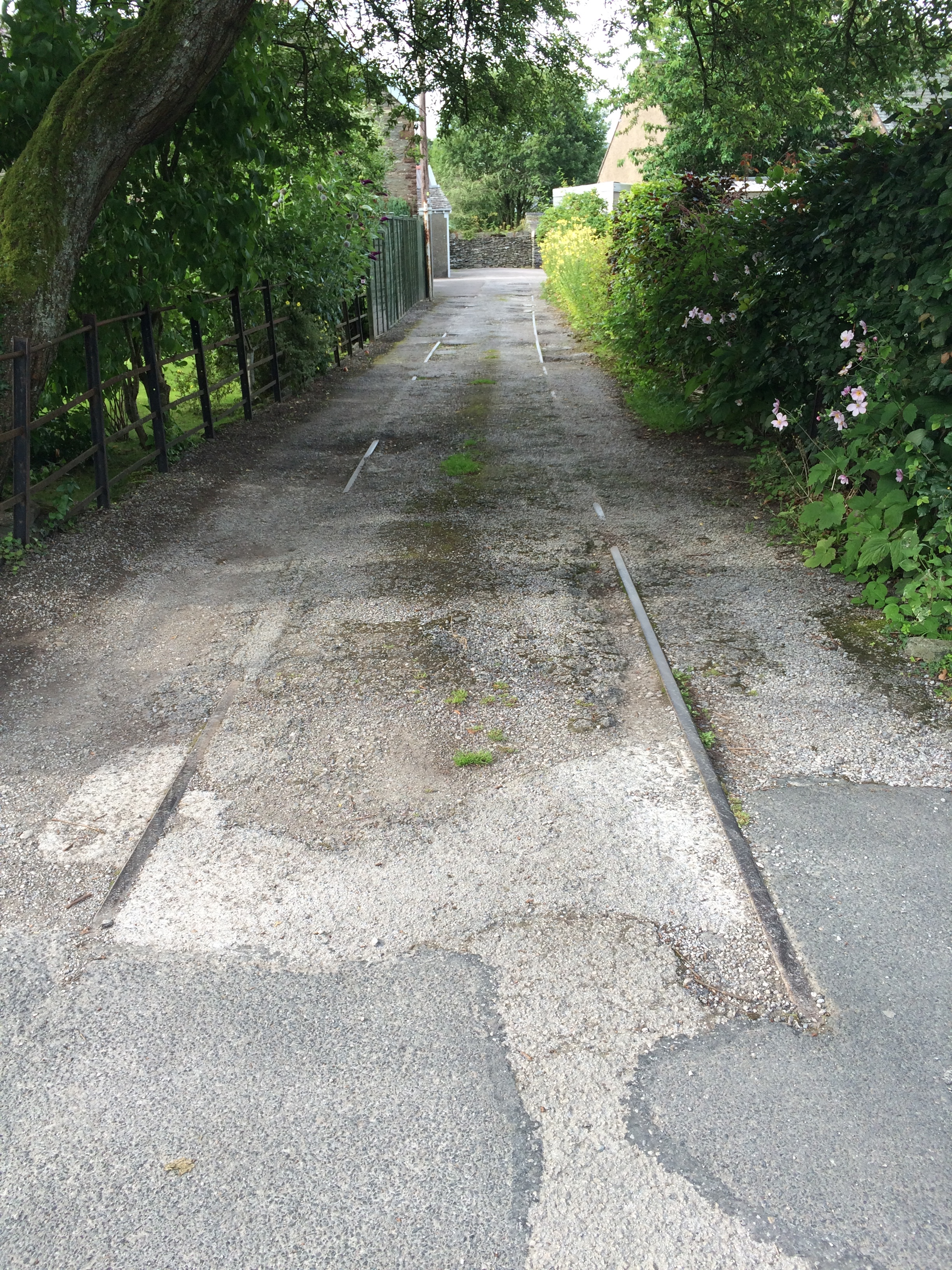
Track from the former railway goods yard, now in the driveway of houses built on the site

The station opened on 20 April 1847 as part of the Kendal and Windermere Railway. From 1880 to 1972, the station had a connection to the Burneside Paper Mills Tramway. This line was subsequently acquired by the London and North Western Railway, and became part of the London, Midland and Scottish Railway at the 1923 Grouping.

The two original platforms were staggered, with the up platform located on the Windermere side of the access crossing, and the down platform located on the Kendal side. Designed and operated as a busy main line double track railway, through trains operated between Windermere and a variety of destinations, including London. Burneside station had goods sidings and a goods yard for freight services.

Freight services were ended on the line in 1972, and the gradual reduction in passenger services culminated in 1973 when the line was reconfigured as a single-track railway, resulting in the closure of the former down platform. All trains, in both directions, have used the original up platform since 1973.

To the east of the station can be found the only two semaphore signals on the line guarding the manually operated road crossing.

== Facilities ==
The station is reached via a short approach road from the centre of Burneside village.

The station has a small waiting shelter, as well as other limited passenger facilities such as benches, a ticket machine and electronic train information. There are spaces for 12 bicycles.

== Services ==
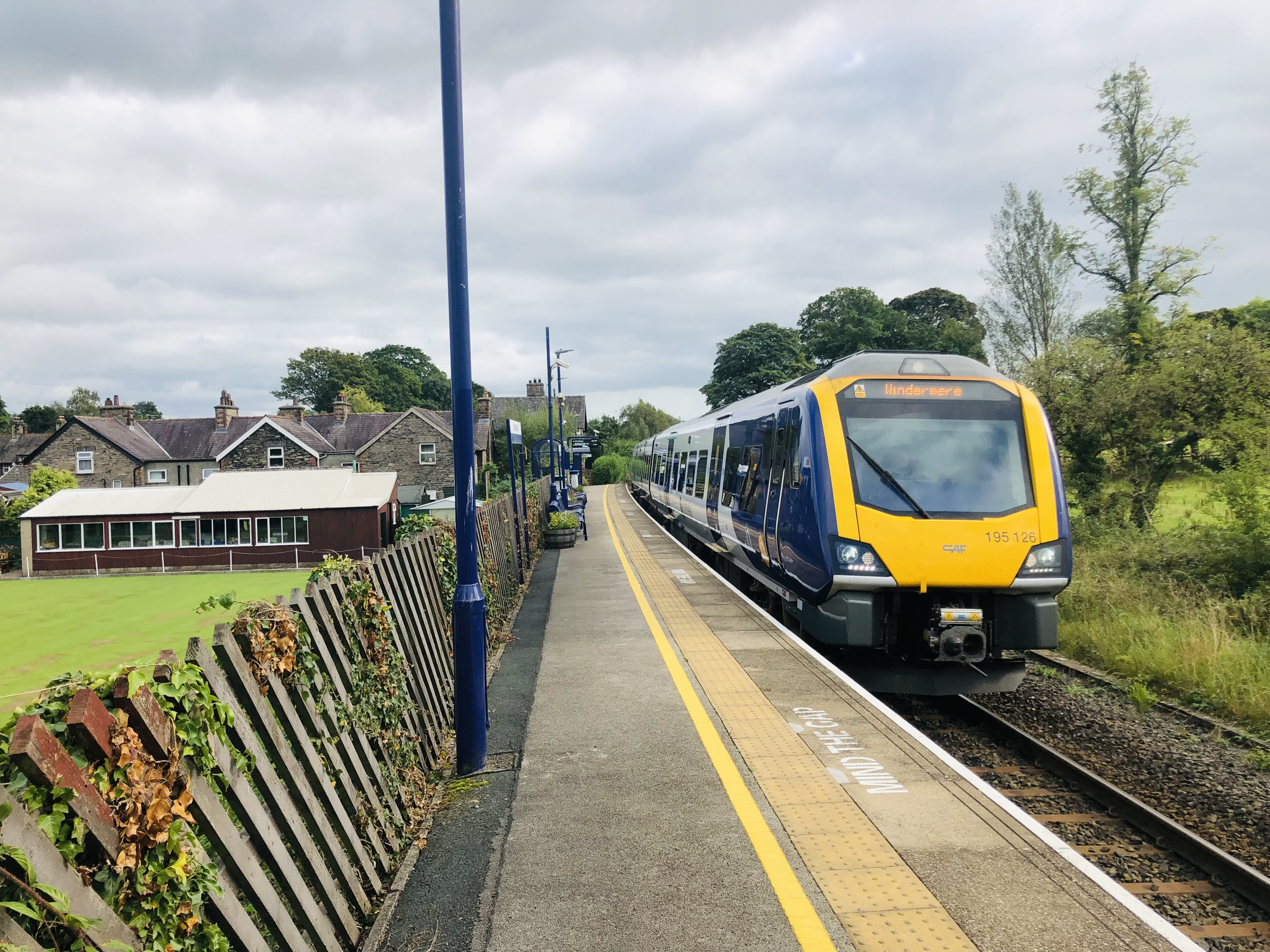
A Class 195 diesel multiple unit with a service bound for Windermere

There is a generally hourly service between Windermere and Oxenholme Lake District, with some services extended to Manchester Airport.

Preceding station	National Rail	Following station
Staveley	Northern; Windermere branch line	Kendal
Staveley	Northern; Windermere – Oxenholme Lake District	Kendal
