= Northern franchise =

The Northern franchise has been operated by the following train operating companies in England:

- Northern Rail 2004–2016
- Arriva Rail North 2016–2020
- Northern Trains 2020–present
