= Staveley railway station =

Railway station in Cumbria, England

Coordinates: 54.375°N 2.819°W

Staveley
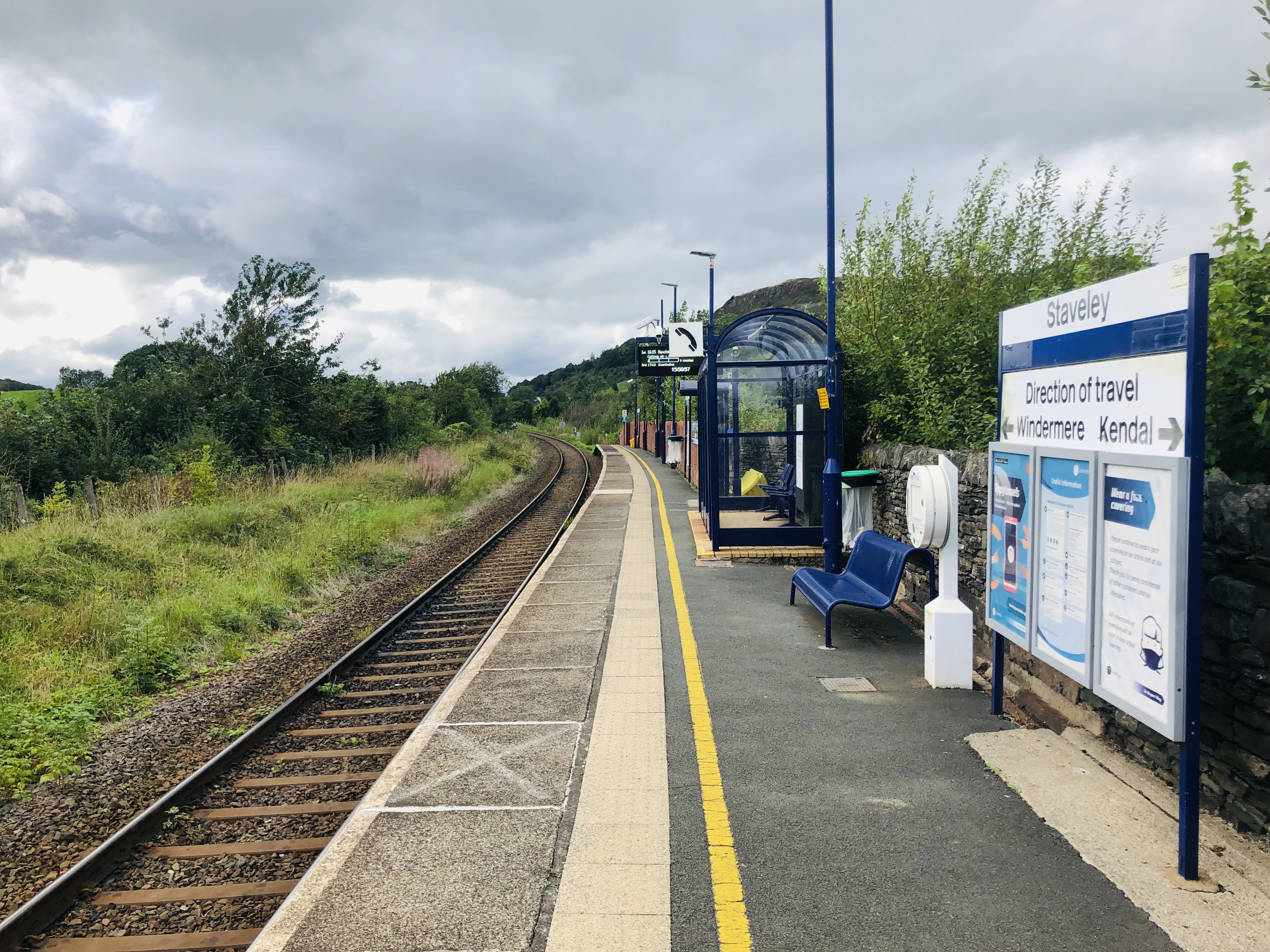
- The platform at Staveley, looking west

General information
- Location: Staveley, Westmorland and Furness; England
- Grid reference: SD469980
- Manager: Northern Trains
- Platforms: 1

Other information
- Station code: SVL
- Classification: DfT category F2

Passengers
- 2021/22: ▲41,460
- 2022/23: ▼34,654
- 2023/24: ▲35,490
- 2024/25: ▲42,876
- 2025/26: ▲48,368
Location
Notes
- Passenger statistics from the Office of Rail and Road

Staveley railway station serves the village of Staveley, in Cumbria, England. It is a stop on the Windermere Branch Line, which connects Oxenholme and Windermere. The station is owned by Network Rail and is operated by Northern Trains, which provides all passenger train services. Staveley was a request stop until December 2012.

== History ==
The station opened on 20 April 1847. On 28 October 1887, John Studholme was using the foot crossing with the intention of getting a train to Windermere, when he was struck by an engine travelling at around 45 mph. He sustained a compound fracture to his right leg, and his collar bone was broken. At the Kendal Memorial Hospital, his leg was amputated the following day.

Until the branch line was reduced to a single track in 1973, there were two platforms opposite each other although the Windermere bound platform was accessed from steps on the opposite side of the road under the road bridge at the east end of the station with a walkway over the bridge to the platform ramp. This can still be seen today from Crook Road/Station Lane and from passing trains.

== Facilities ==
The station has a single platform. There is a single waiting shelter provided, along with customer information screen and a help point to offer train running details. There is a BT payphone in the shelter. No step-free access is available, as the only entrance is via a staircase from Station Road.

== Services ==
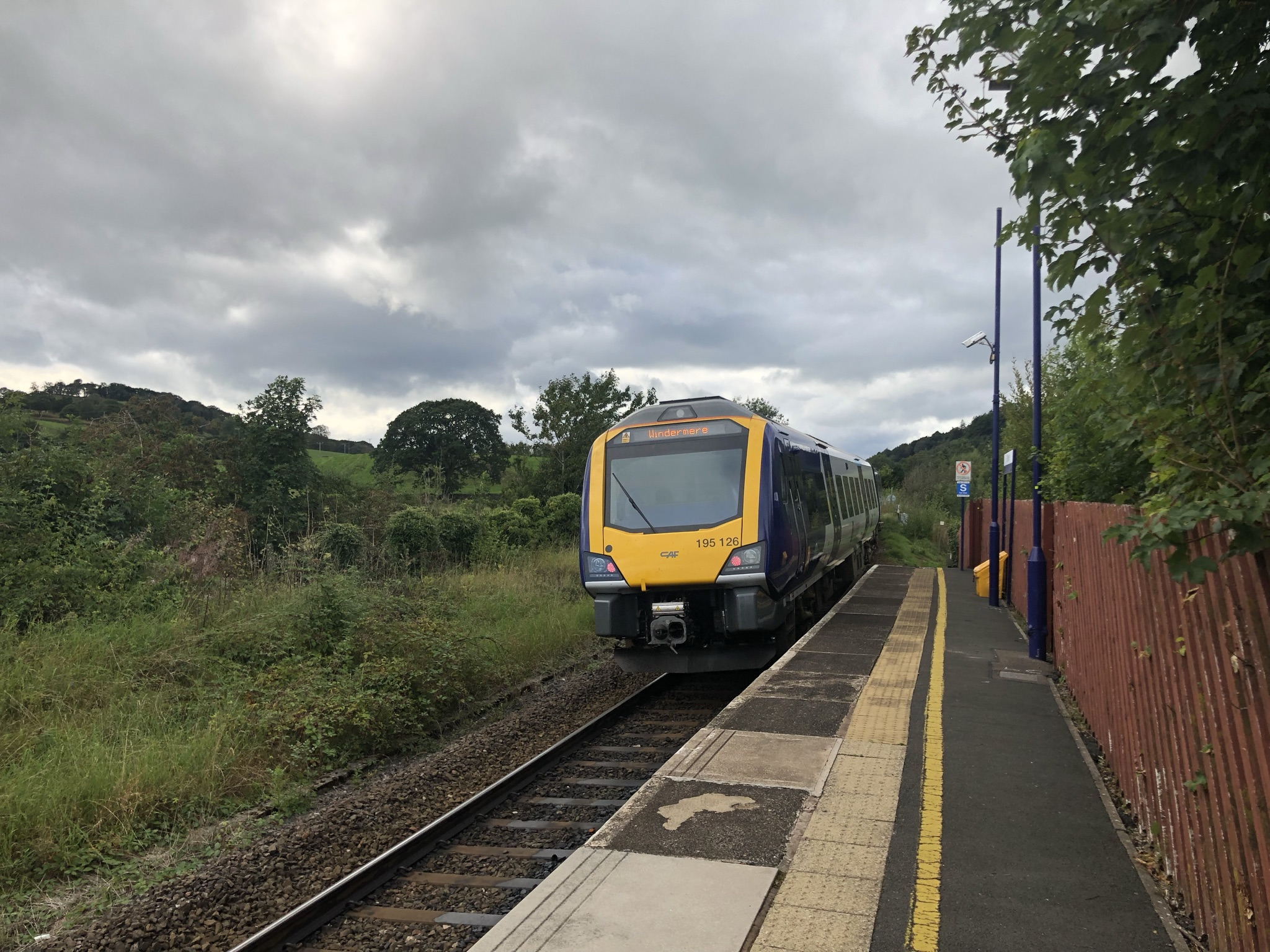
A Class 195 diesel multiple unit departing for Windermere

There is a generally hourly service between Windermere and Oxenholme Lake District, with some services extended to Manchester Airport.

| Preceding station | National Rail | Following station |
|---|---|---|
| Windermere | Northern Trains; Windermere branch line | Burneside |
| Windermere | Northern Trains; Windermere–Manchester Airport (limited service) | Burneside |
