= Kendal railway station =

Railway station in Cumbria, England

Coordinates: 54.332°N 2.740°W

Kendal
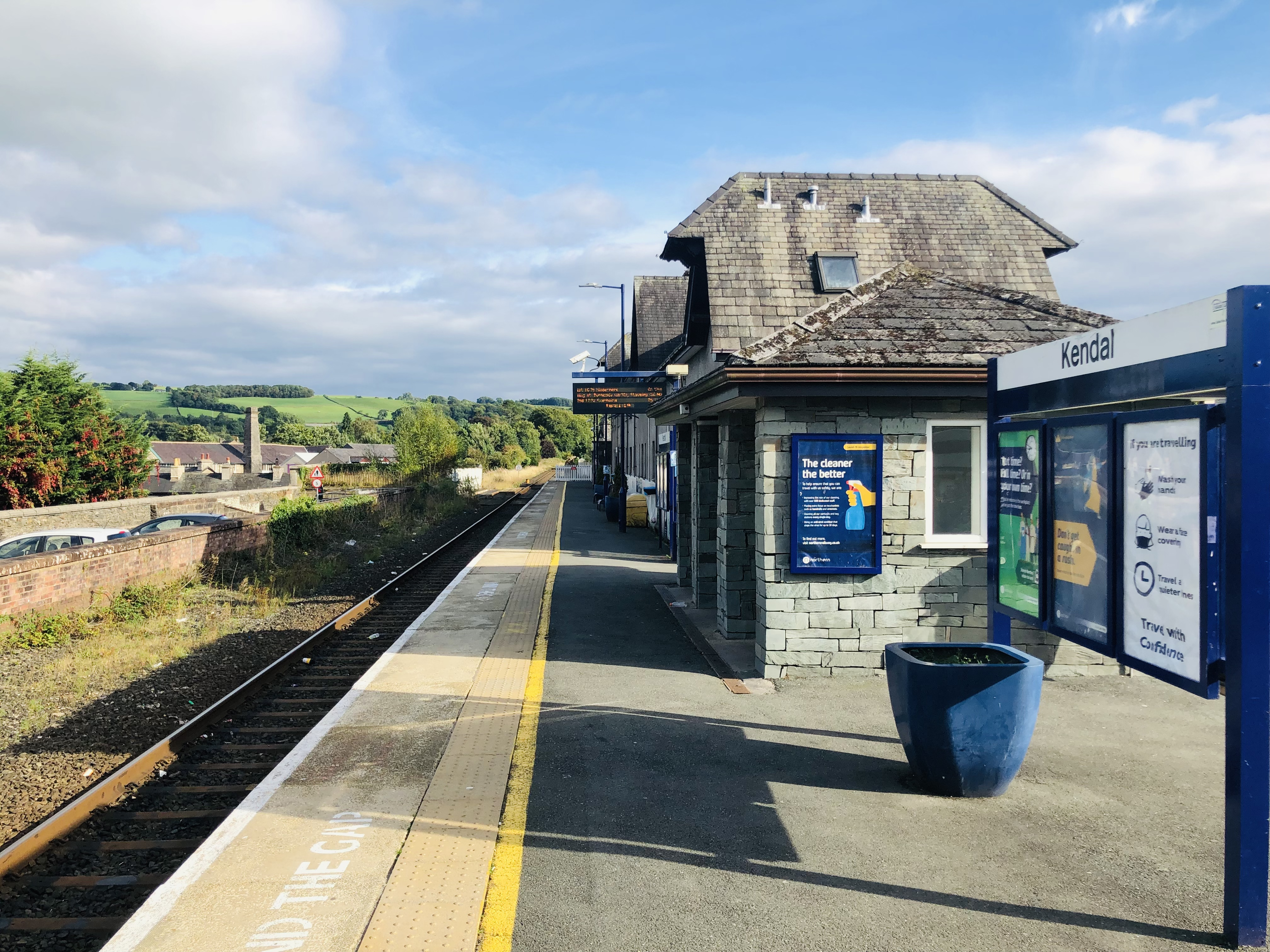
- The platform at Kendal, looking south-east

General information
- Location: Kendal, Westmorland and Furness; England
- Grid reference: SD519932
- Manager: Northern Trains
- Platforms: 1

Other information
- Station code: KEN
- Classification: DfT category F1

Passengers
- 2020/21: ▼82,676
- 2021/22: ▲0.183 million
- 2022/23: ▼0.153 million
- 2023/24: ▲0.155 million
- 2024/25: ▲0.180 million
Location
- Location within the former South Lakeland district Location within Cumbria
Notes
- Passenger statistics from the Office of Rail and Road

Kendal railway station serves the market town of Kendal, in Cumbria, England. It is a stop on the Windermere branch line, which runs between Oxenholme and Windermere. The station is owned by Network Rail and is operated by Northern Trains, which provide all passenger services.

== History ==
The station opened on 28 September 1846 as the temporary terminus of the Lancaster and Carlisle Railway. Through trains operated from 20 April 1847 when the Kendal and Windermere Railway opened its line to Windermere.

The second platform at the station was taken out of use when the line was singled in May 1973. A car park now occupies the site of the demolished Oxenholme-bound platform, signal box and goods depot. The signal box was dismantled after closure and rebuilt at Kirkby Stephen on the Settle-Carlisle Line. The former station building survives, but no longer forms part of the station itself; it is now in private commercial use.

== Facilities ==
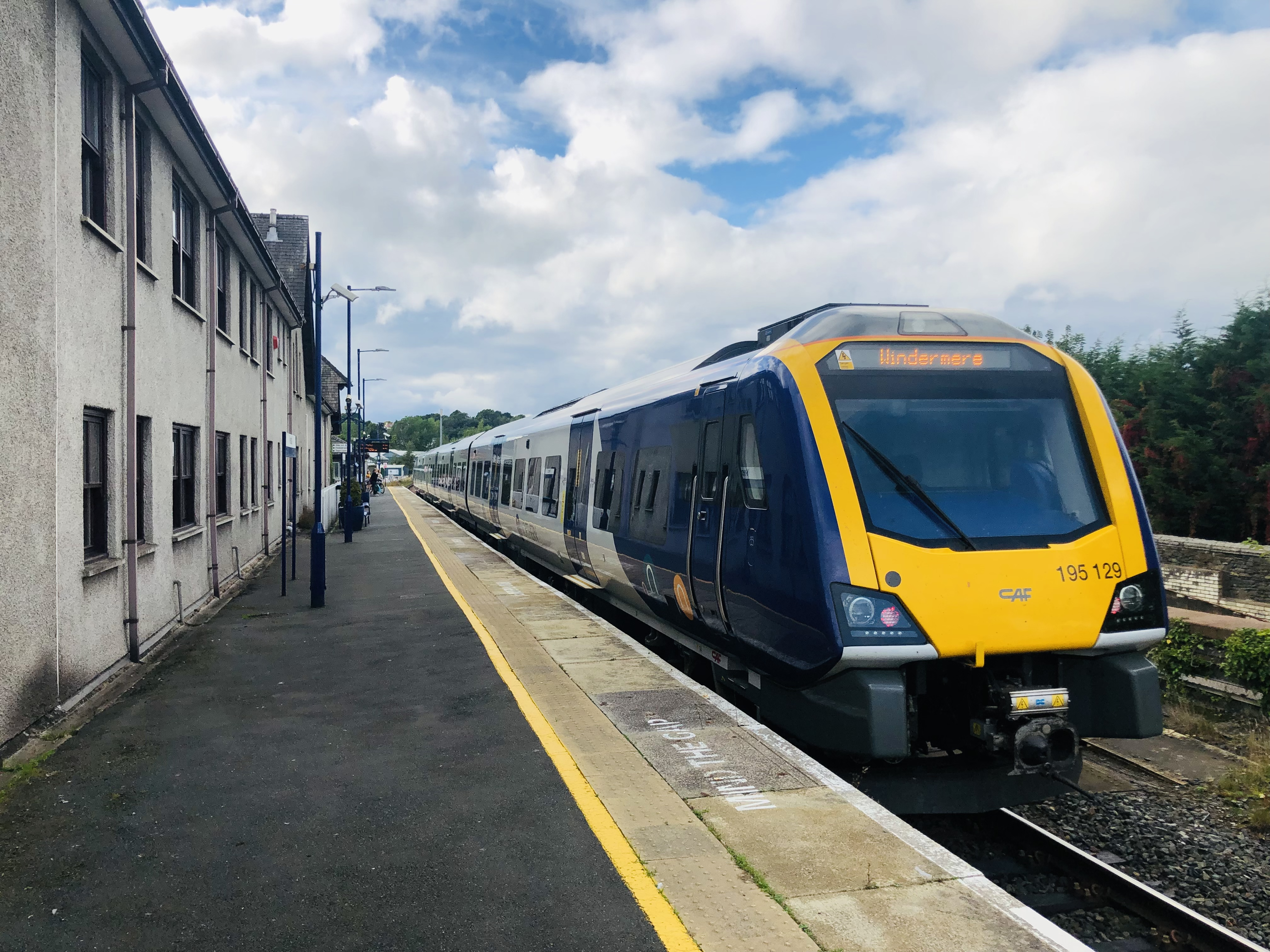
A Class 195 diesel multiple unit at the platform

The station has one platform, which has a stone-built shelter. It is unstaffed; passengers must buy tickets in advance or from the ticket machine by the platform. A penalty fare may be charged by the conductor on board the train if you board without a valid ticket. Train running information is provided via digital CIS displays, a customer help point and timetable posters. Step-free access is available from the four-space car park and main entrance to the platform.

== Service ==
The station is served by one train per hour in each direction between Windermere and Oxenholme, with some services continuing on to Manchester Airport. Passengers for most other destinations must change at Oxenholme.

Preceding station	National Rail	Following station
Burneside	Northern Trains; Windermere branch line	Oxenholme Lake District
Windermere	Northern Connect; Windermere - Manchester Airport	Oxenholme Lake District
Burneside	Northern Connect; Windermere - Manchester Airport	Oxenholme Lake District
