= Windermere railway station =

Terminus station in Cumbria, England

Coordinates: 54.380°N 2.903°W

Windermere
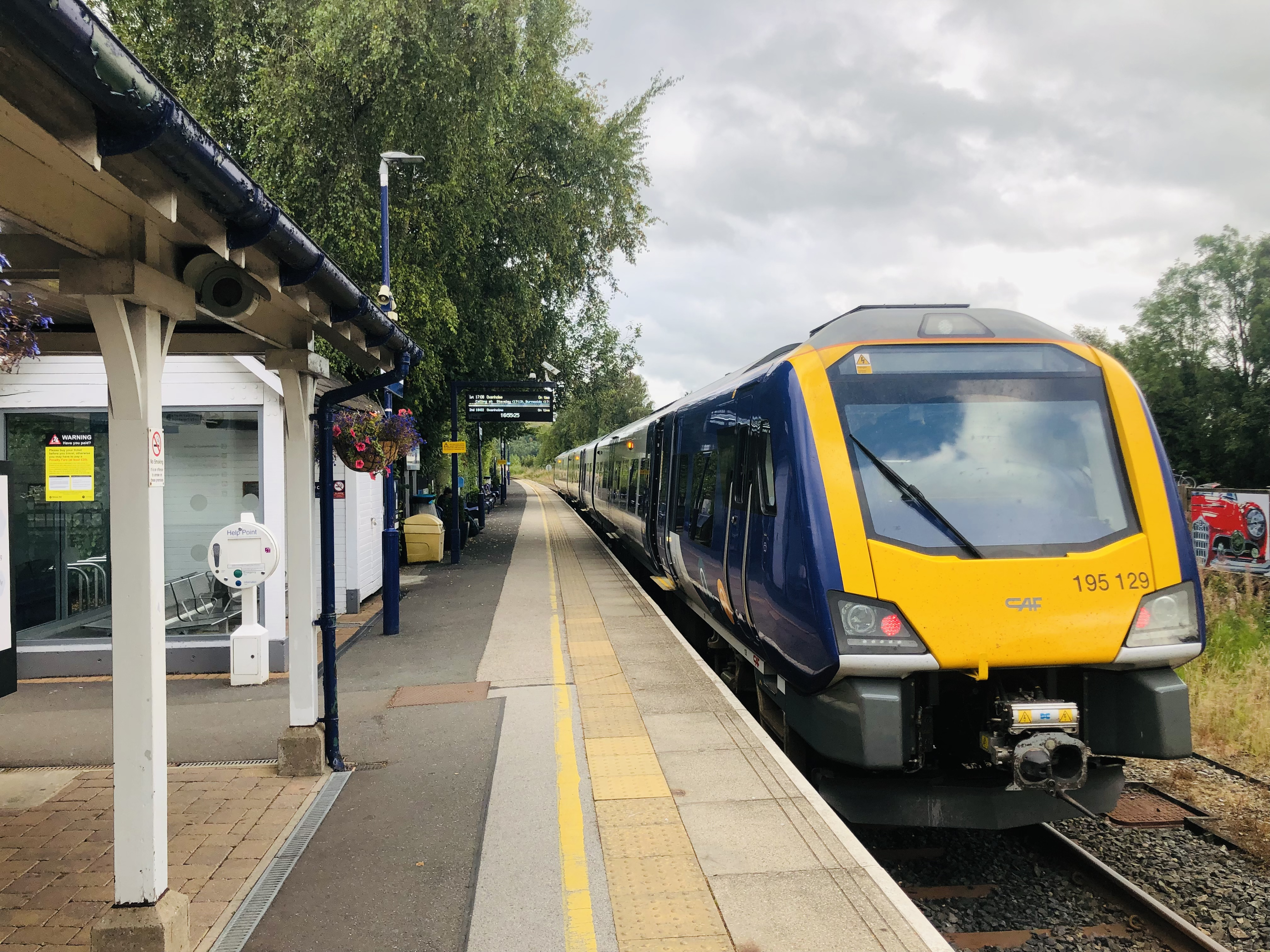
- A Class 195 at the platform

General information
- Location: Windermere, Westmorland and Furness; England
- Grid reference: SD413986
- Manager: Northern Trains
- Platforms: 1

Other information
- Station code: WDM
- Classification: DfT category E

History
- Opened: 1847
- Original company: Kendal and Windermere Railway
- Pre-grouping: London and North Western Railway
- Post-grouping: London, Midland and Scottish Railway; London Midland Region of British Railways

Key dates
- 20 April 1847: Opened
- 1973: Reduced to single track

Passengers
- 2020/21: ▼0.115 million
- 2021/22: ▲0.310 million
- 2022/23: ▲0.316 million
- 2023/24: ▲0.363 million
- 2024/25: ▲0.403 million
Location
- Location within the former South Lakeland district Location within Cumbria
Notes
- Passenger statistics from the Office of Rail and Road

Windermere railway station serves the town of Windermere, in Cumbria, England. It is the northern terminus of the Windermere Branch Line, which runs from Oxenholme. It is owned by Network Rail and is operated by Northern Trains, which provides all passenger train services.

It is located just south of the A591, about 25 min walk or a short bus ride from Lake Windermere. The station is located behind a former branch of the Booths supermarket chain, which occupies the site of the original station building, in front of the Lakeland store.

== History ==
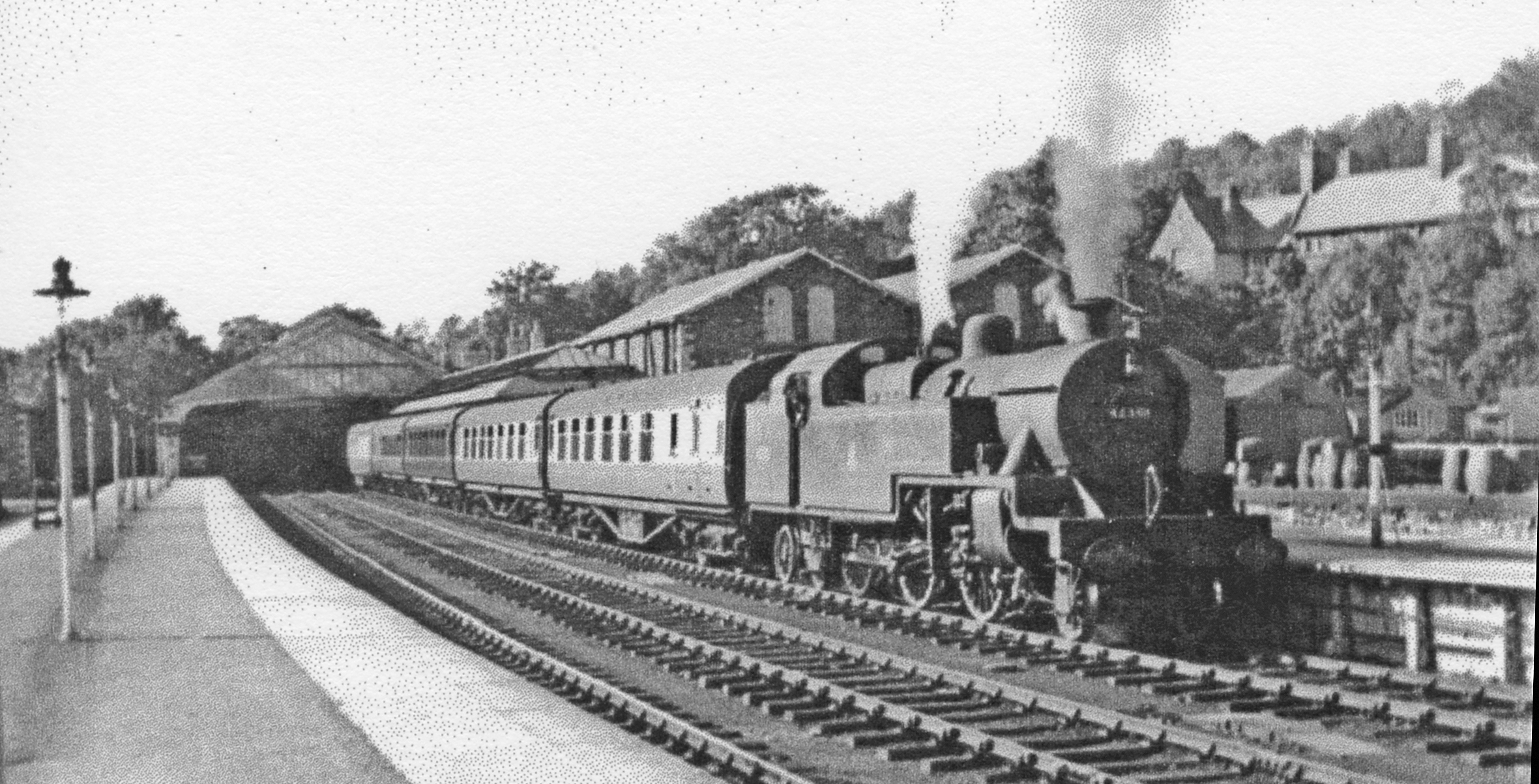
Windermere station in 1951

It is the terminus of the former Kendal and Windermere Railway.

The Terrace, a row of cottages built for railway executives in 1849, is said to have been designed by the architect Augustus Pugin. One of the fireplaces is a copy of one of his in the Palace of Westminster.

The selection of the town of Birthwaite as the location of the station serving the lake was what led to it taking the name Windermere, even though it is not on the water; nowadays, it has essentially grown together with Bowness-on-Windermere, which touches the lake.

The station was at one time bigger than at present, with four platforms and an overall roof. Three tracks were taken out of use when the branch was reduced to a one-train operated single line in 1973 as an economy measure. The single track was cut back to a new truncated station in 1986, following the demolition of the train shed and the building of a Booths supermarket; this has been designed to mimic the appearance of the original train shed and incorporates the facade and canopy of the original station.

== Facilities ==
The station has a staffed ticket office that is open throughout the week (06:00 to 20:45 on weekdays and Saturdays, 10:30 to 20:45 on Sundays); a self-service ticket machine is also provided for use outside these times and for collecting pre-paid tickets. A post box, toilets and a waiting room are available, along with cycle hire facilities and a pay phone. Running information is offered on customer information screens and timetable posters. Level access is available from the ticket office and station entrance to the platform. Responsibility for operating the line passed from First TransPennine Express to Northern in April 2016.

== Services ==
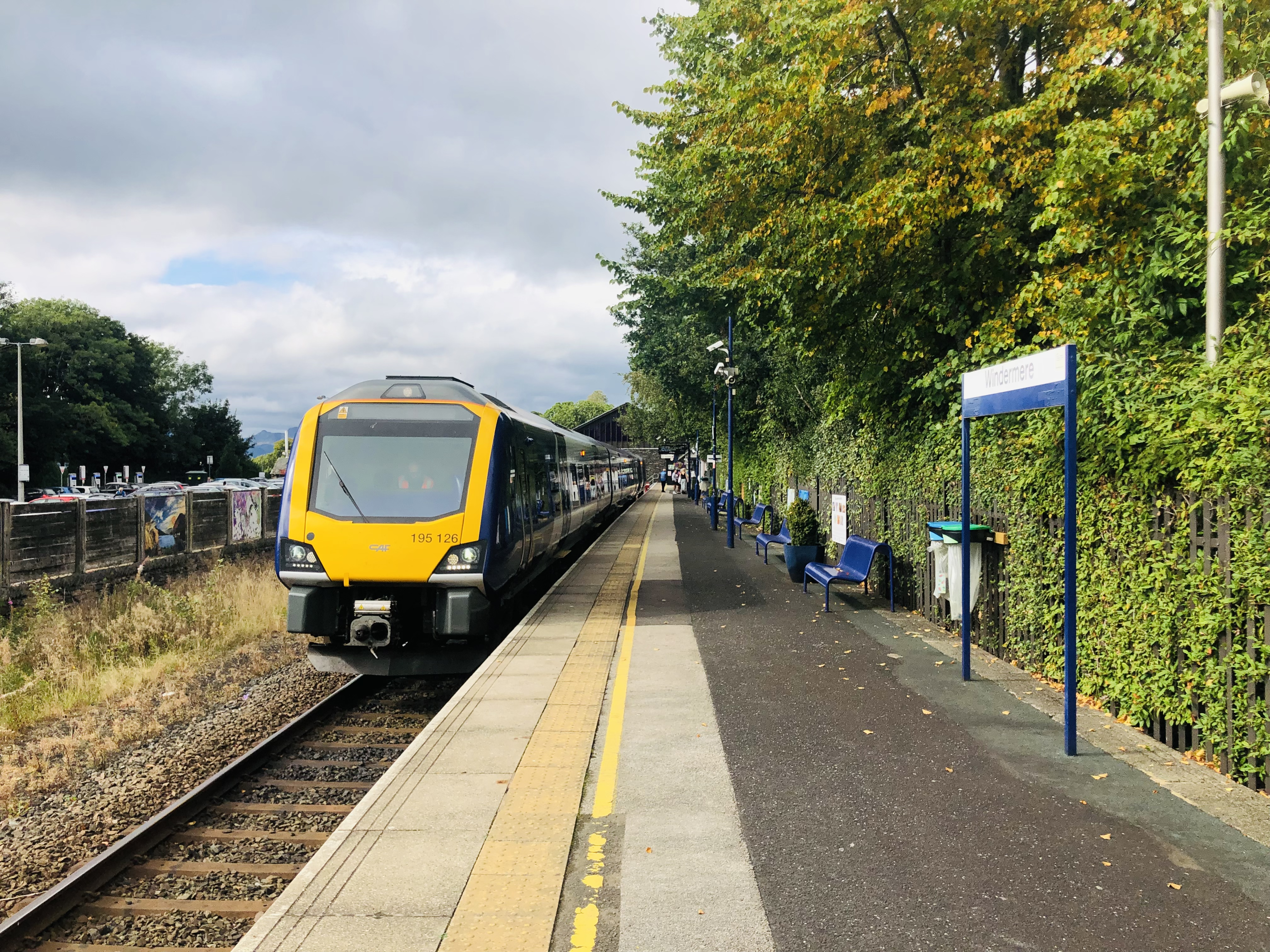
A Class 195 diesel multiple unit awaiting departure for Oxenholme Lake District

Northern Trains operates a generally hourly service to Staveley, Burneside Kendal and Oxenholme Lake District, with some services extended to Manchester Airport which generally runs every 2 hours.

Preceding station	National Rail	Following station
Terminus	Northern Trains Windermere branch line	Staveley
Terminus	Northern Connect; Windermere - Manchester Airport	Staveley (limited service)
Terminus	Northern Connect; Windermere - Manchester Airport	Kendal

== Bus services ==
The station is also a hub for Stagecoach Cumbria & North Lancashire bus services connecting Windermere with Coniston, Grasmere, Keswick, Kendal and other destinations in Cumbria.

Stagecoach also runs regular buses through the town to the lake at Bowness-on-Windermere on the 599 route; these buses are open-top double-decker buses and run every 20 minutes in the summer. The 597 minibus service links the station with the housing estates and health centre three mornings a week.
