= Oxenholme =

Hamlet in Cumbria, England

Coordinates: 54.30163°N 2.72373°W

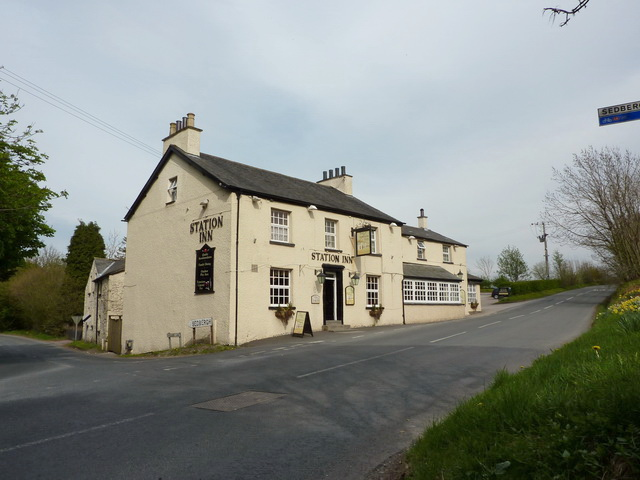
- Station Inn, Oxenholme

- Location within Cumbria
- OS grid reference: SD530898
- Civil parish: Kendal
- Unitary authority: Westmorland and Furness
- Ceremonial county: Cumbria
- Region: North West
- Country: England
- Sovereign state: United Kingdom
- Post town: KENDAL
- Postcode district: LA9
- Dialling code: 01539
- Police: Cumbria
- Fire: Cumbria
- Ambulance: North West
- UK Parliament: Westmorland and Lonsdale

Oxenholme (/ˈɒksənhoʊm/ OX-ən-hohm or locally /ˈɒksnoʊm/ OX-nohm) is a hamlet in the Westmorland and Furness area of Cumbria, England. It is in the historic county of Westmorland and is part of the civil parish of Kendal, and lies just to the south east of the town. It is best known for Oxenholme Lake District railway station on the West Coast Main Line.

== History ==
Oxenholme station opened in 1847 as Kendal Junction and was renamed Oxenholme in 1860. The village grew around the station. The station name had the suffix "Lake District" added in 1988.

== Name ==
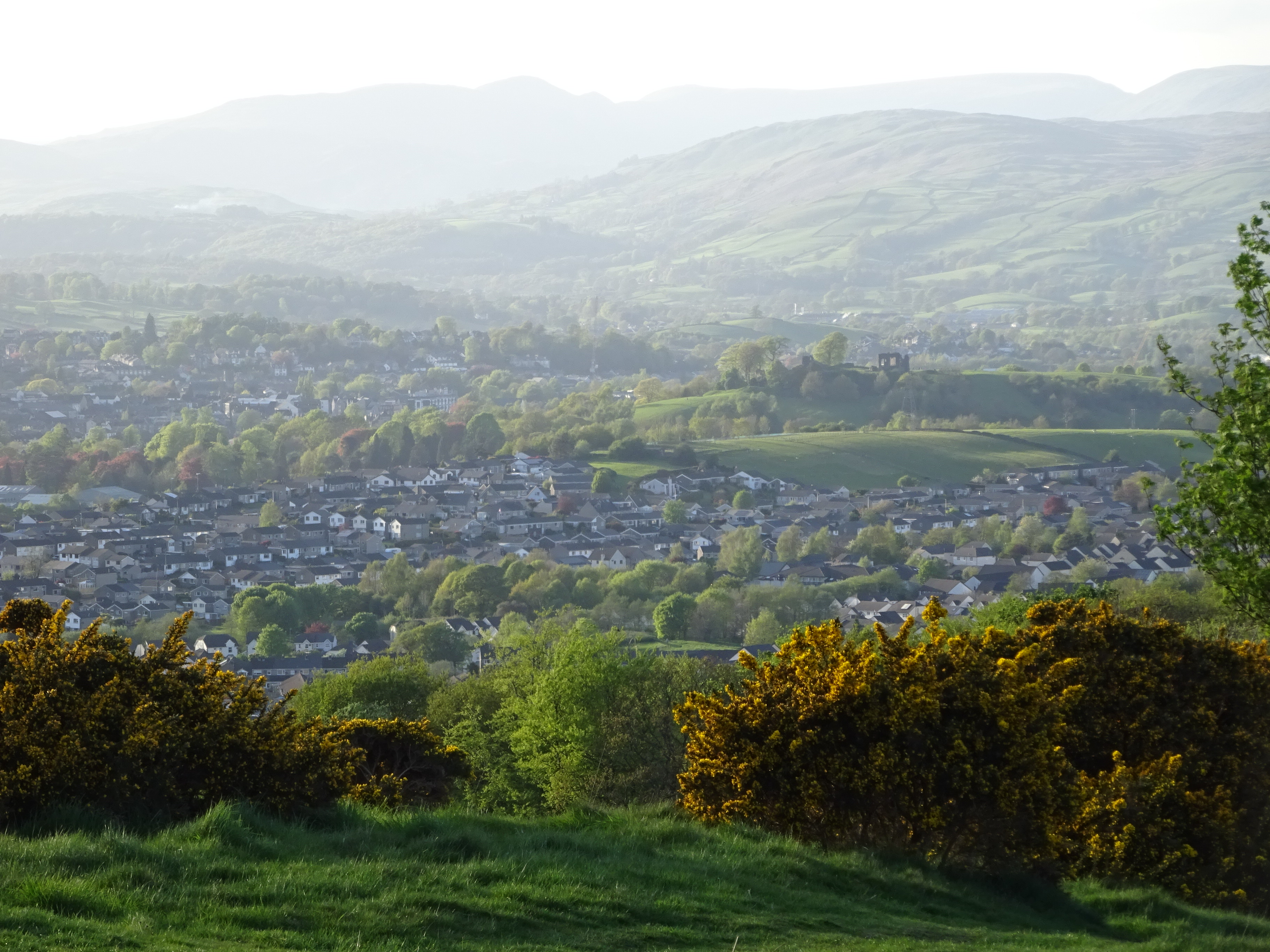
View of Kendal from the Helm, a hill at Oxenholme

The village has always been called Oxenholme, after a local farm whose name suggests a cow farm. The name is usually pronounced oxen-home, though pronounced ox-nome locally.

== Governance ==
The village is part of the Kendal civil parish.

The village is in the Kendal South ward on Westmorland and Furness unitary authority and Kendal Town Council.

As of 2023 Oxenholme has been represented by Jonathan Brook and Doug Rathbone, both members of the Liberal Democrat Party.

As of 2022 Oxenholme has been represented by Liberal Democrat Guy Tirvengadum on Kendal Town Council.

It is part of the Westmorland and Lonsdale constituency and the MP as of 2024 is Liberal Democrat Tim Farron.

== Crime ==
Oxenholme has a low crime rate; only one crime, a minor theft, was reported in 2009.

== Health ==
The village is part of the Cumbrian National Health Service area. Westmorland General Hospital, the local hospital, is located just outside the village.

== Transport ==
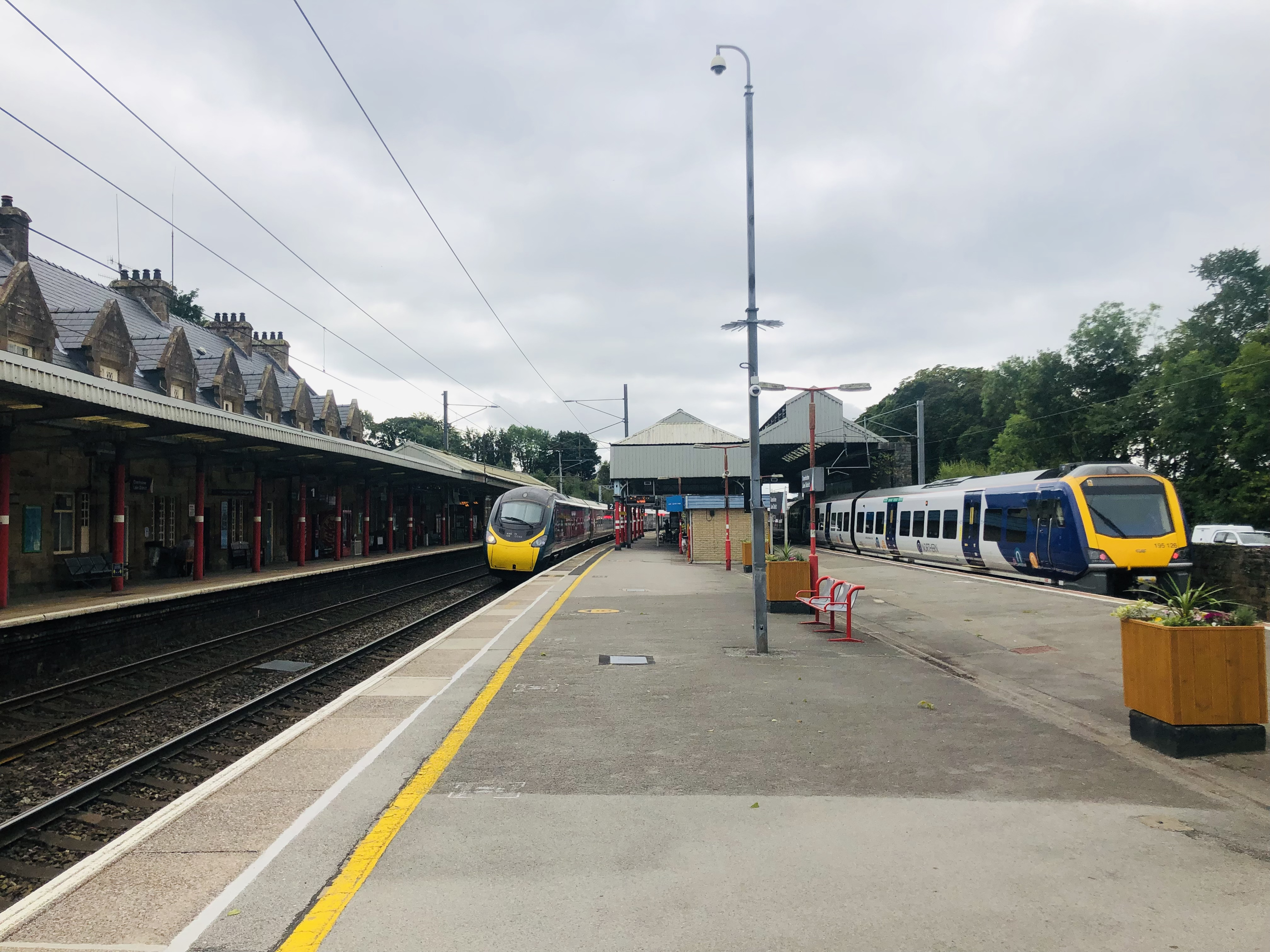
Oxenholme railway station

=== Train ===
Oxenholme Lake District station, located in the village, is a junction between the West Coast Main Line and the Windermere Branch Line.

=== Road ===
The A65 runs through the village and is close to the M6 motorway.

=== Bus ===
The village has 3 bus routes. The Kendal town circular's 41/41A and the 567 to Kendal or to Kirkby Lonsdale then Ingleton.

=== Air ===
The nearest airports are Leeds Bradford (62 miles) and Teesside International (70 miles) and Manchester (78 miles).

== Media ==
The local newspaper covering the area is The Westmorland Gazette.

Local radio includes BBC Radio Cumbria, Heart North West and Smooth North West.

The village is covered by both the ITV Border and BBC North West TV regions.

== Oxenholme in the news ==
Oxenholme appears in the news more often than a typical settlement of its size. Most of the news is to do with the railway.

- On 10 February 1965 fugitive John Middleton shot two policemen while hiding in the waiting room at Oxenholme railway station. Carlisle policemen George Russell and Alex Archibald were shot, and Russell died in hospital a few hours later.
- On 27 May 2006, a 19-year-old man was stabbed aboard a Glasgow-Paignton train as it was coming into the station. A 22-year-old man was jailed for 21 years for the murder in November 2006.
- A Virgin Pendolino train derailed on 23 February 2007 close to nearby Grayrigg shortly after leaving Oxenholme station. The crash left one person dead, and 22 others injured.
