= Blackburn King Street TMD =

Railway depot in Blackburn, England

Coordinates: 53.743°N 2.492°W

- Interactive map of Blackburn King Street TMD

Location
- Location: Blackburn, Lancashire

Characteristics
- Owner: Network Rail
- Operator: Northern Trains
- Depot code: ??
- Type: DMU
- Rolling stock: Class 150; Class 156; Class 195

History
- Opened: 2017

Blackburn King Street TMD is a railway traction maintenance depot (TMD) located in Blackburn, England. Opened and commissioned in late 2017, Blackburn King Street is a stabling, cleaning and maintenance point for diesel multiple units operated by Northern Trains, which is the largest train operator in Northern England.

== History ==
Construction of Blackburn King Street TMD, which was then provisionally known as "King Street depot", was given the go ahead to commence by Blackburn with Darwen Council in September 2016, as part of a wider investment package in the area's rail infrastructure. The location selected for the new depot, which was known as "The Wrangling", was the site of disused coal sidings near to Blackburn station on the East Lancashire line.

Built by the Stowe-based Buckingham Group at a cost of £23 million, construction of Blackburn King Street was completed on schedule in August 2017, with official opening taking place in October. The depot became operational in November 2017.

== Usage ==
Up to thirty diesel powered units can be stabled across Blackburn King Street's six sidings.

Unit classes which are currently stabled at Blackburn King Street are the Class 150, Class 156 and Class 195.
