= Oxenholme Lake District railway station =

Railway station in Cumbria, England

Oxenholme Lake District
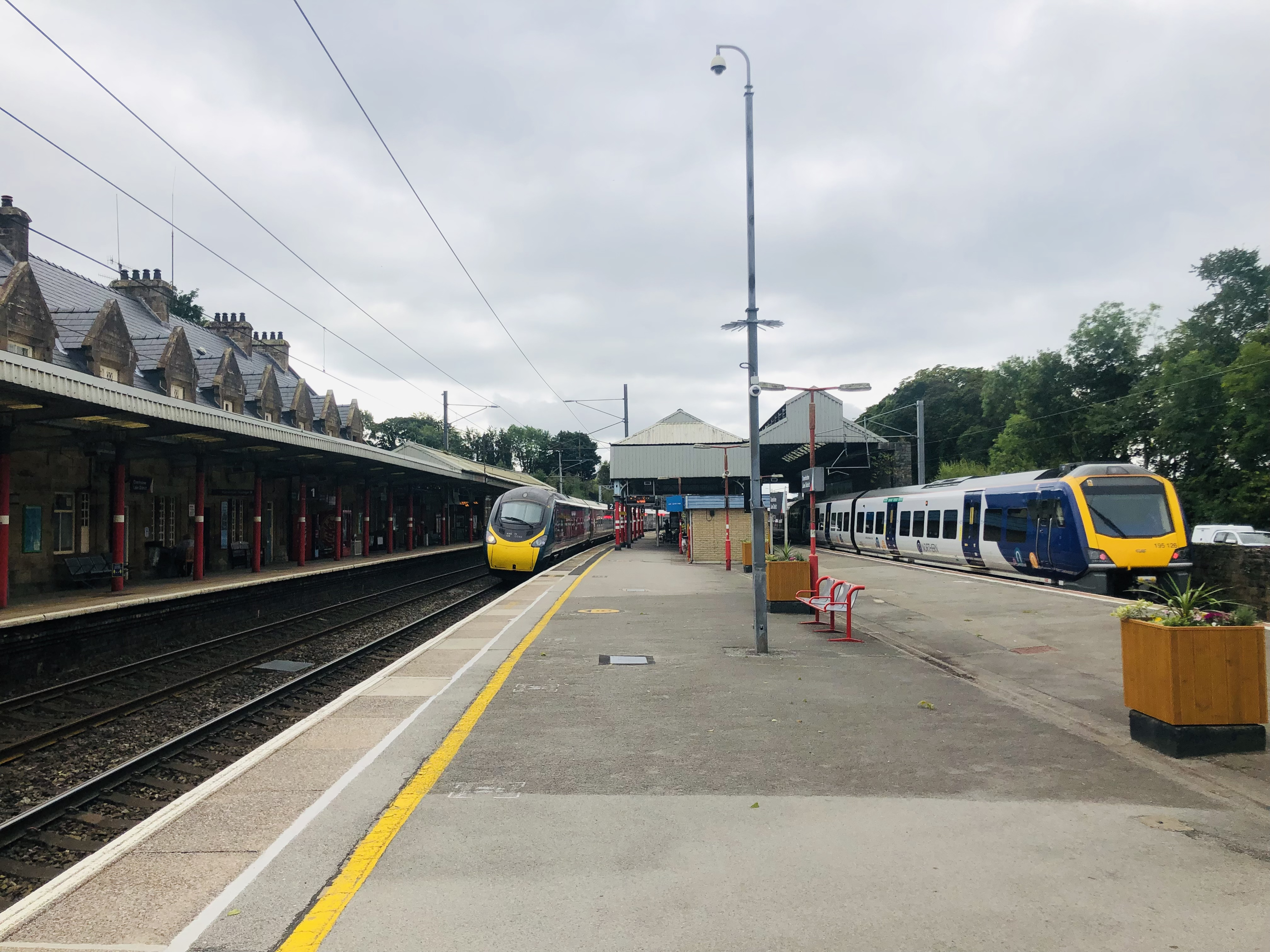
- An Avanti West Coast Class 390 and a Northern Trains Class 195, looking south

General information
- Location: Oxenholme, Westmorland and Furness; England
- Coordinates: 54.305°N 2.722°W
- Grid reference: SD531901
- Manager: Avanti West Coast
- Platforms: 3

Other information
- Station code: OXN
- Classification: DfT category D

History
- Original company: Lancaster and Carlisle Railway
- Pre-grouping: London and North Western Railway
- Post-grouping: London, Midland and Scottish Railway

Key dates
- July 1847: Opened as Kendal Junction
- c. 1860: Renamed Oxenholme
- 1988: Renamed Oxenholme The Lake District

Passengers
- 2021/22: ▲0.700 million
- Interchange: ▲0.177 million
- 2022/23: ▼0.482 million
- Interchange: ▲0.354 million
- 2023/24: ▲0.542 million
- Interchange: ▲0.484 million
- 2024/25: ▲0.675 million
- Interchange: ▲0.701 million
- 2025/26: ▲0.798 million
- Interchange: ▲0.748 million
Location
Notes
- Passenger statistics from the Office of Rail and Road

Oxenholme Lake District railway station serves the village of Oxenholme, near Kendal, in Cumbria, England. It is a stop on the West Coast Main Line and is the south-eastern terminus of the branch line to Windermere. The station is managed by Avanti West Coast and is owned by Network Rail.

== History ==
The station was constructed as part of the Lancaster and Carlisle Railway, which is now a section on the West Coast Main Line from London to Glasgow. Initially the railway was earmarked to pass through Kendal; however, a 2.1 miles (3.4 km) tunnel would have had to have been built north of the town to accommodate this route. As it was deemed too expensive an option, a line running 1 mile (1.6 km) east of Kendal was adopted. The line between Lancaster and Oxenholme opened in September 1846. Trains from Lancaster passed through Oxenholme to a temporary terminus at Kendal; this ended when the line to Carlisle was completed in December 1847.

With the decision to avoid Kendal, the Kendal and Windermere Railway was promoted instead, with Oxenholme becoming a junction station. The branch line would operate between Oxenholme and its terminus at Windermere, although it lies in Birthwaite about 0.75 miles (1.2 km) from Windermere itself. The station opened in April 1847 as Kendal Junction and was renamed Oxenholme in 1860.

The station's popularity with visitors to The Lakes was fictionalised by Arthur Ransome in the Swallows and Amazons series of children's books, where it was renamed Strickland Junction. In Pigeon Post Roger releases a homing pigeon there.

=== Incidents ===
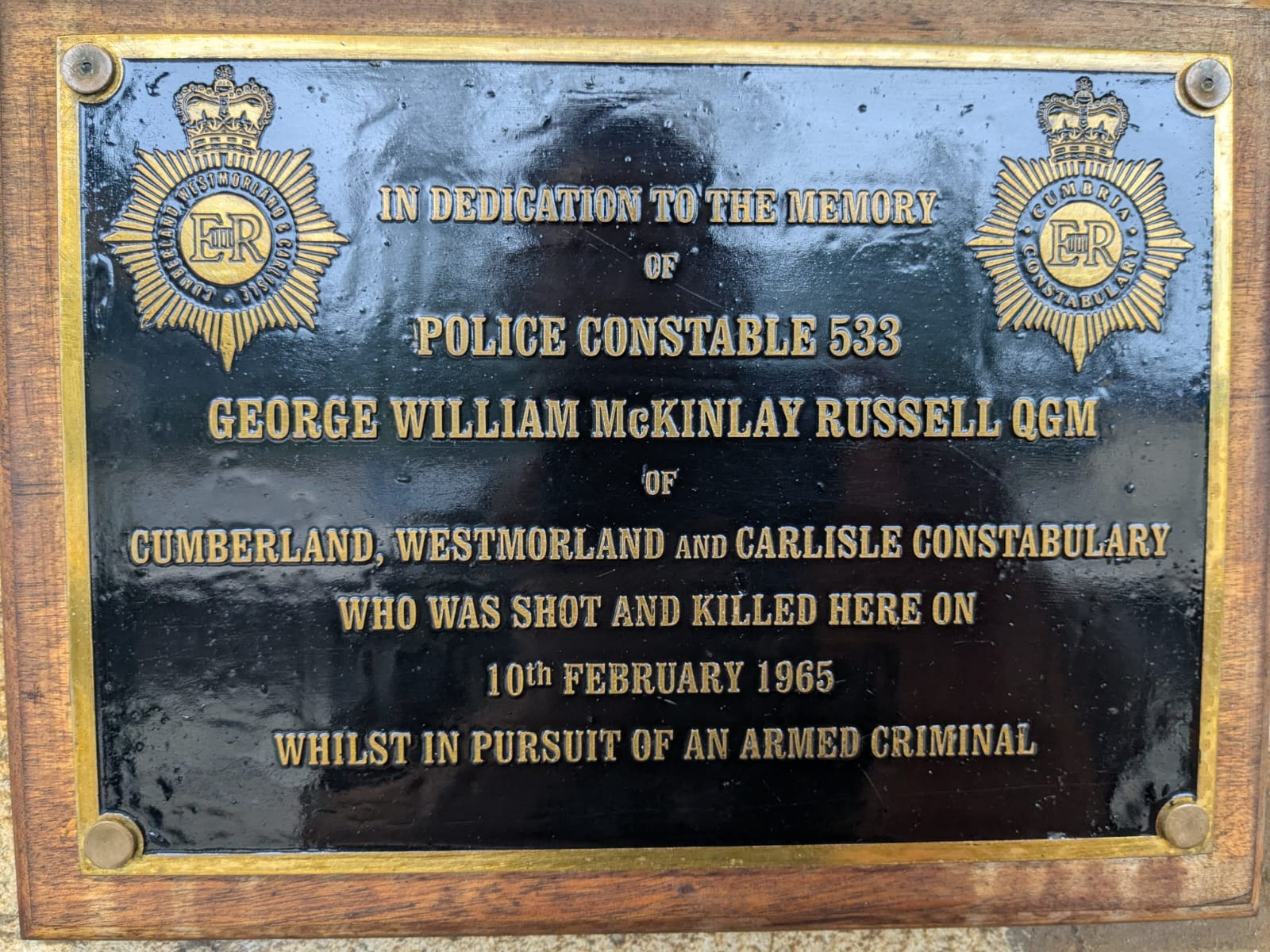
Memorial plaque of George Russell, murdered at Oxenholme railway station

On 10 February 1965, fugitive John Middleton, who was hiding in the waiting room, shot Carlisle policeman Alex Archibald at the station. His colleague, George Russell, who was also shot, died a few hours later in hospital. The killer later shot himself in the head.

On 27 May 2006, a 19-year-old man was fatally stabbed on board a Glasgow Central to Paignton train as it was entering the station. A 22-year-old man was jailed for 21 years for the murder in November 2006.

The Grayrigg rail crash happened on 23 February 2007, when a Virgin Trains Class 390 Pendolino derailed shortly after it had left Oxenholme Lake District station; one person died and 22 others were injured in the crash.

On 16 August 2022, passengers departing at Oxenholme from a delayed service from London Euston were locked in at the station after staff went home early; some passengers attempted to escape by climbing a security fence. A Network Rail worker eventually reopened the exit 45 minutes after the train had arrived.

== Facilities ==
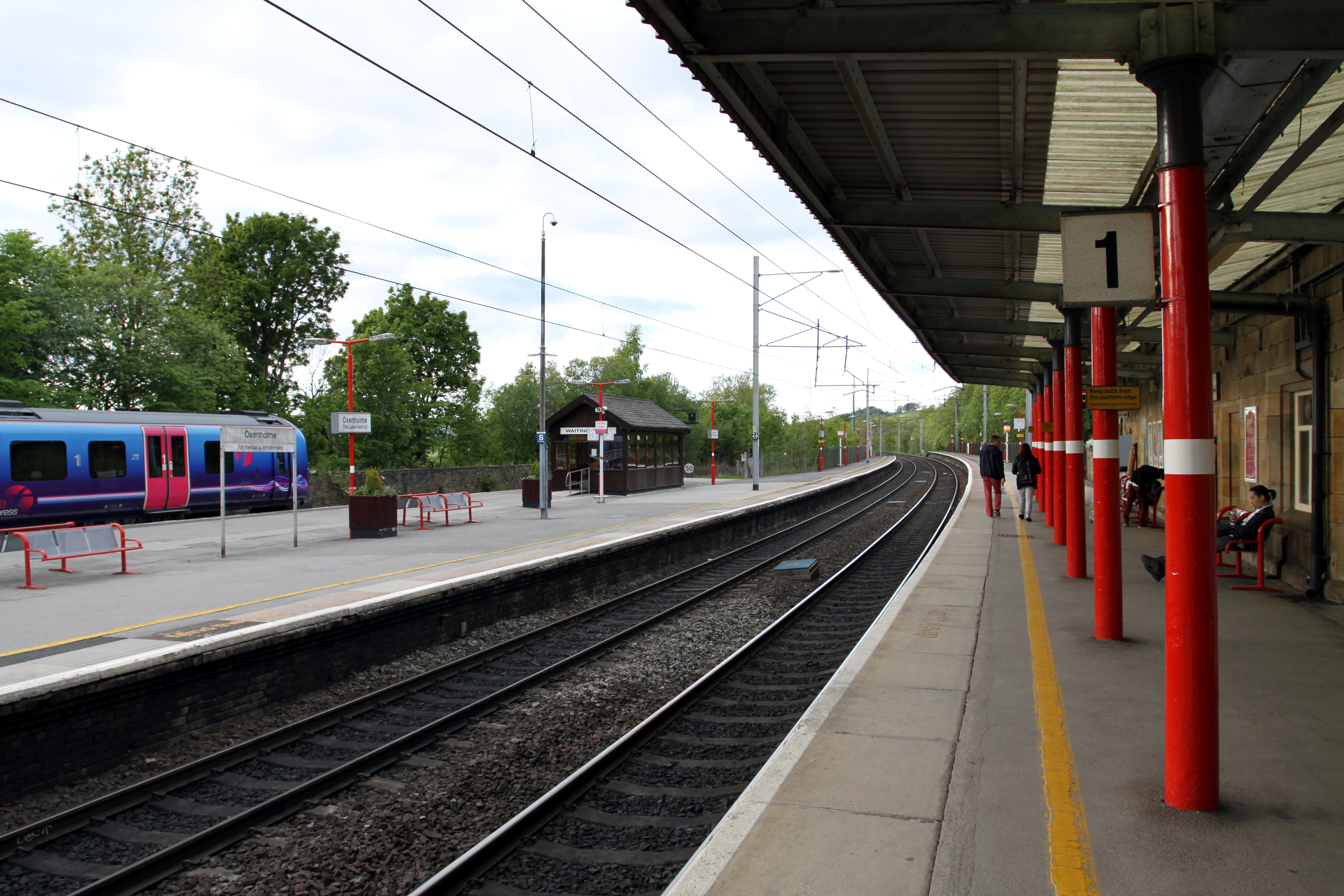
The station in 2013, looking north

The station is fully staffed, with the ticket office open all week (Monday - Saturday 05:45 - 19:00, Sunday 10:45 - 20:15). A self-service ticket machine is also available in the booking hall for use outside these times and for collecting pre-paid tickets. Waiting rooms are provided on both platforms, along with a variety of other amenities including a coffee kiosk, cycle racks, toilets, shop and food/drink vending machines. Train running information is offered via automated announcements, digital display screens and customer help points. The subway linking the platforms and both entrances have inclined ramps and so is accessible for disabled passengers; wheelchair users are advised to request assistance from station staff as the ramps are quite steep.

== Services ==
The station is served by three train operating companies:

- Avanti West Coast services between London Euston to Glasgow Central or Edinburgh Waverley call here to provide connections with the Windermere branch. There is usually one train per hour to London Euston (either direct or Birmingham New Street) and every hour to Edinburgh or Glasgow via Carlisle, with more at peak times.
- TransPennine Express services between Manchester Airport and Glasgow/Edinburgh also serve the station once per hour each way, with one direct train per day serves Liverpool
- Northern Trains operates services to and from Windermere. Most services start and terminate here, but some occasionally run through to Lancaster, Preston and Manchester Airport.

Preceding station	National Rail	Following station
Carlisle	Avanti West Coast West Coast Main Line	Lancaster
Penrith North Lakes	Avanti West Coast West Coast Main Line	Lancaster
Carlisle	TransPennine Express TransPennine North West; Edinburgh / Glasgow Central–Manchester Airport	Lancaster
Penrith North Lakes	TransPennine Express TransPennine North West; Edinburgh / Glasgow Central–Manchester Airport	Lancaster
Carlisle	TransPennine Express TransPennine North West; Glasgow Central–Liverpool Lime Street	Lancaster
Penrith North Lakes	TransPennine Express TransPennine North West; Glasgow Central–Liverpool Lime Street	Lancaster
Kendal	Northern Trains; Windermere–Manchester Airport	Lancaster
Kendal	Northern Trains; Windermere branch line	Terminus
