= Windermere branch line =

Railway line in Cumbria, England

- 195109 near Staveley with a service to Windermere

Overview
- Status: Operational
- Owner: Network Rail
- Locale: Cumbria, North West England
- Termini: Windermere, Oxenholme Lake District
- Connecting lines: West Coast Main Line
- Stations: 5

Service
- System: National Rail
- Operator: Northern Trains
- Rolling stock: Class 195

History
- Opened: 1847

Technical
- Line length: 10 mi 15 ch (16.40 km)
- Number of tracks: 1
- Track gauge: 1,435 mm (4 ft 8 1/2 in) standard gauge
- Loading gauge: W6
- Operating speed: 60 mph (97 km/h) maximum
Route map
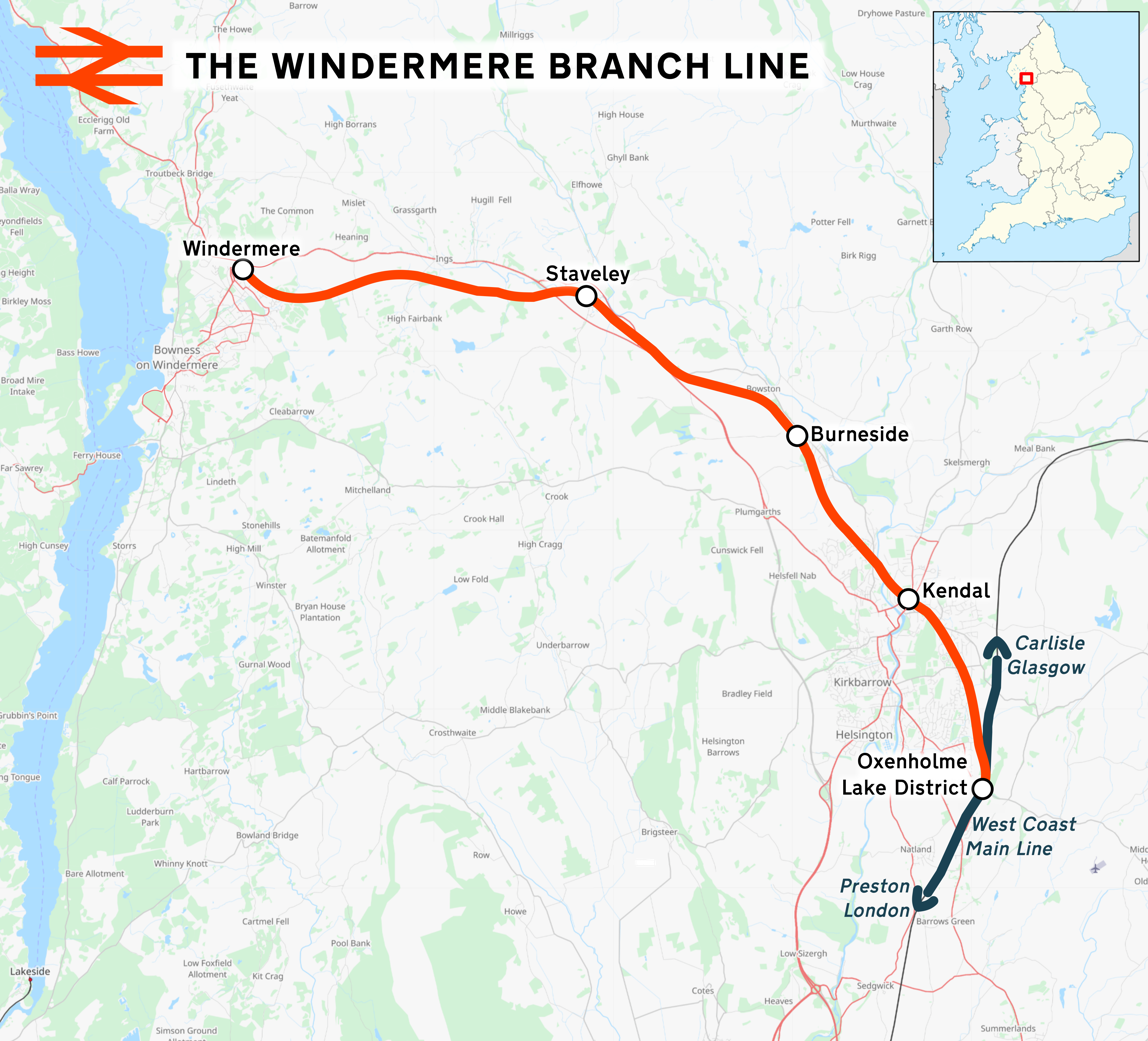
(Click to expand)

The Windermere branch line, also called the Lakes line, is a railway line in the Westmorland and Furness area of the county of Cumbria, in North West England. It runs between Oxenholme (on the West Coast Main Line), Kendal and Windermere. The line has a loading gauge of W6.

== History ==
The ten mile (16 km) long line, which opened on 20 April 1847, was built as the Kendal and Windermere Railway and at its southern end connected into the Lancaster and Carlisle Railway. In 1859, it became part of the London and North Western Railway, then the London, Midland and Scottish Railway at the 1923 Grouping.

Upon nationalisation in 1948, it was managed by the London Midland Region of British Railways. On privatisation in 1994, it was initially operated by First North Western, then First TransPennine Express from 2005 and by Northern from April 2016.

The line was built originally as a double-tracked main line, with through links to destinations including Morecambe Euston Road, Preston, Manchester Exchange and London Euston. It was reduced to a single line branch in May 1973, when the West Coast Main Line, which it joins at Oxenholme, was resignalled and electrified. Freight traffic to the last active depot at Kendal had previously ceased in 1972.

There are no passing loops or sidings on the route, which is operated under One Train Working with Train Staff regulations, with only one train allowed on the line at any time. Entry to and exit from the branch is controlled by the signalling centre at Carlisle; before a service can proceed beyond the branch platform at Oxenholme, the driver must collect the train staff from a cabinet on the platform, which is electrically released by the Carlisle signaller. Once the train has made its journey to the terminus and back again, the staff must be returned to the cabinet before the train can either leave for the south or make another return trip along the single line.

Due to the lack of a run round loop at the Windermere terminus, all services need to be operated by diesel multiple units or locomotive-hauled trains operating in top and tail mode. In British Rail days, the service was operated as a self-contained shuttle and passengers were required to change at Oxenholme but, since privatisation, some through trains to Lancaster, Preston and Manchester Airport have been operated.

On 4 June 2018, Arriva Rail North announced that all trains on the line would be suspended and replaced by a bus service to allow for driver training. The service suspension was initially to be for 2 weeks until 18 June 2018, but this was later extended until 2 July 2018. However, on 17 June 2018, charter train operator West Coast Railways introduced its own services on the line, which attracted substantially more passengers than the regular Arriva Rail North services. The reason for this may be that no fares were charged to passengers. The £5,500 per day reported cost, with a total of approximately £80,000 over two weeks of operation, is said to have been paid for by the Department for Transport.

== Services ==
There is a generally hourly service between Windermere and Oxenholme Lake District, with some services extended to Manchester Airport.

== Rolling stock ==
The line currently uses the British Rail Class 195.

When the route was run by First TransPennine Express between 2007 and April 2016 it was run by the Class 185. Between April 2016 and the introduction of the Class 195 it was run by the Class 156.

== Electrification proposal ==
In August 2013, the Department for Transport announced that the line was to be electrified as part of the wider scheme to wire many other routes in North West England, such as the Manchester–Preston line. The £16 million scheme would have allowed through trains from Lancaster and points south to use electric multiple units, rather than the current diesel operation, and also improve capacity on the route to allow new direct services to London Euston. Funding was approved in 2014 and electrification was planned to be undertaken in CP6, which covers 2019–2024.

However, on 20 July 2017, it was announced that electrification of the Windermere branch had been cancelled. As an alternative, Northern originally planned to utilise Class 769 bi-mode units, which would operate under electric power between Manchester and Oxenholme, then under diesel power on the Windermere branch. However, it was later announced that new Class 331 Civity units would be installed with batteries with trials starting from 2021. Currently these trains do not operate however, and all services remain diesel operated.

Platform 3 at Oxenholme Lake District was electrified in 2018, despite the cancelled branch line electrification. In 2023, the former Cumbria County Council, now Westmorland and Furness Council submitted a bid to the UK Government to create a dynamic passing loop. This would run to the west of Burneside station and include reinstating the missing platform. The whole project would include line speed improvements, as well as the much discussed electrification.

== The line in fiction ==
The branch line appears in fiction in Arthur Ransome's children's novel Pigeon Post; two of the children releasing a pigeon at Strickland Junction before they go up "the little branch line that led into the hills" (and to the lake).
