= Kendal and Windermere Railway =

Railway company in England

The Kendal and Windermere Railway built a branch line from the main line to Kendal and on to Windermere, in Cumbria in north-west England. It was promoted by local interests in Kendal when it became clear that the Lancaster and Carlisle Railway would not be routed through Kendal. It was built from a junction at Oxenholme to Kendal to a terminus near Windermere; at the time there was no settlement of that name. The line opened in April 1847. The engineer was Joseph Locke and the partnership of contractors consisted of Thomas Brassey, William Mackenzie, Robert Stephenson and George Heald.

Excursion traffic and residential development was greatly encouraged by the branch line, and the town of Windermere flourished but the company was not commercially successful and sold its line to the London and North Western Railway. The leisure business on which the branch line depended declined considerably around 1960 and the infrastructure was simplified. It remains open as the Windermere branch line.

== Origin ==
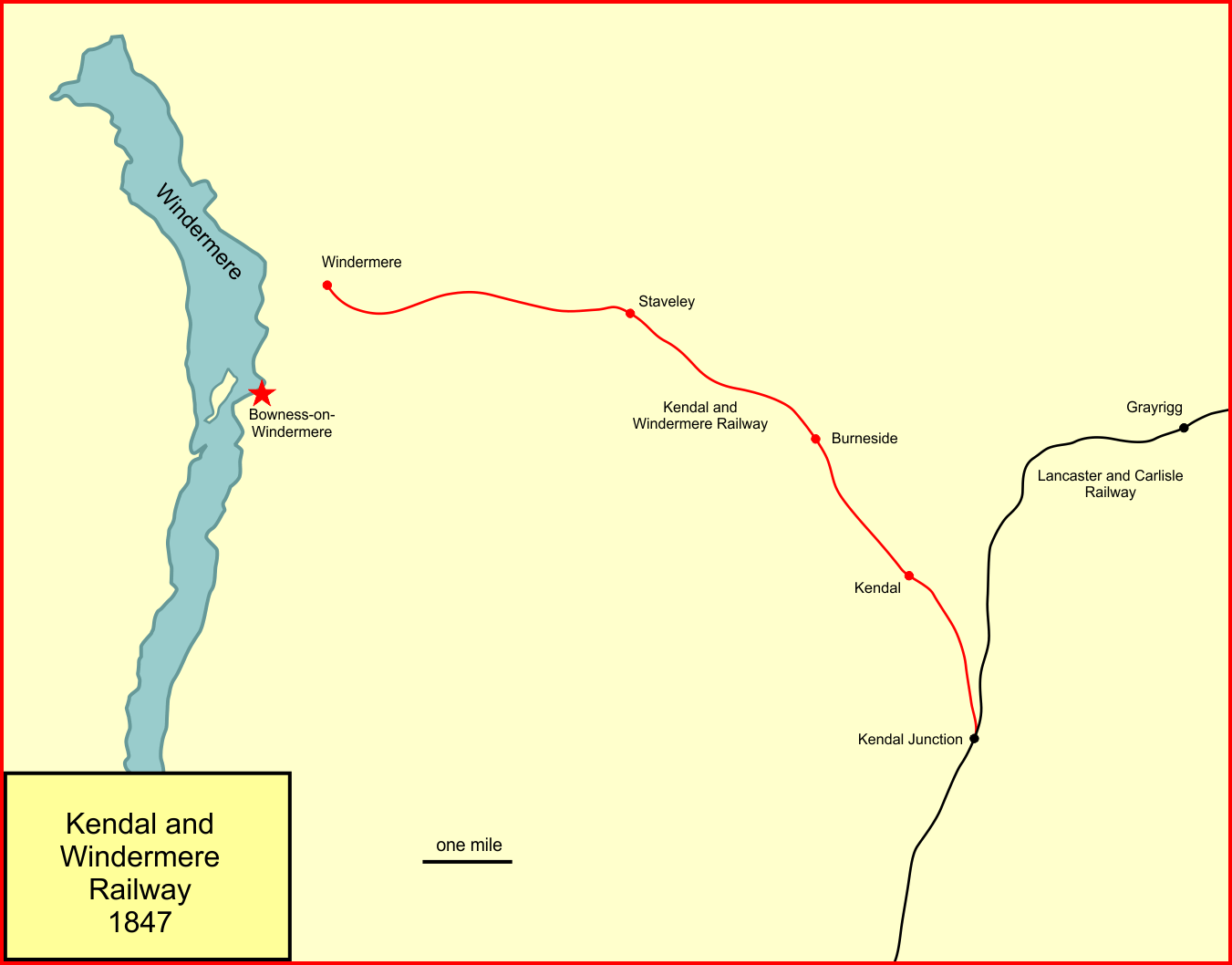
Kendal and Windermere Railway in 1847

In the 1830s there were parallel efforts to construct railways in both England and central Scotland, but the two networks were not connected. From 1832 it became increasingly certain that a connection between England and Scotland would be built northward from Preston to Carlisle and beyond. The difficult terrain presented a significant challenge, particularly because steam engines did not have a great hauling power in the early years. A line following the Cumberland coast reached by a massive barrage across Morecambe Bay was proposed, but although it gave access to population centres, it was a very roundabout route and the cost of the Morecambe Bay barrage would be considerable.

More direct routes were proposed involving steep gradients and long tunnels and several were viable. Kendal was the only town of any size between Lancaster and Carlisle and there was great dismay in Kendal when the favoured routes by-passed the town. A possible route running north from Kendal along Long Sleddale required a long and deep tunnel to proceed to the west shore of Hawes Water. (Note: Later developed as Haweswater Reservoir.)

Finance was hard to come by and proponents of the Lancaster and Carlisle Railway, delayed presenting a Bill in Parliament, but in 1843 their engineer, Joseph Locke, made some modifications to the intended route to save expense, and published a route passing several miles east of Kendal. Interested parties in Kendal decided to build a branch railway to their town from the Lancaster and Carlisle Railway and continue it to the shore of Windermere, which was by then a tourist attraction.

Kendal and Windermere Railway Act 1845
- Act of Parliament
- Parliament of the United Kingdom
- Long title: An Act for making a Railway from the Lancaster and Carlisle Railway to Birthwaite in the Parish of Windermere, to be called "The Kendal and Windermere Railway."
- Citation: 8 & 9 Vict. c. xxxii

Dates
- Royal assent: 30 June 1845

In the 1845 session of Parliament, a bill was presented for the Kendal and Windermere Railway which was to run from Oxenholme to Birthwaite, a small community in what is now Windermere town. It would make a junction with the Lancaster and Carlisle Railway at Oxenholme. The bill passed without opposition, and royal assent was given to the Kendal and Windermere Railway Act 1845 (8 & 9 Vict. c. xxxii) on 30 June 1845. The line would be single track between Kendal and Windermere, although it was changed to double track, without increasing the authorised £125,000 share capital. Construction was carried out in collaboration with the Lancaster and Carlisle Railway.

== Opening ==
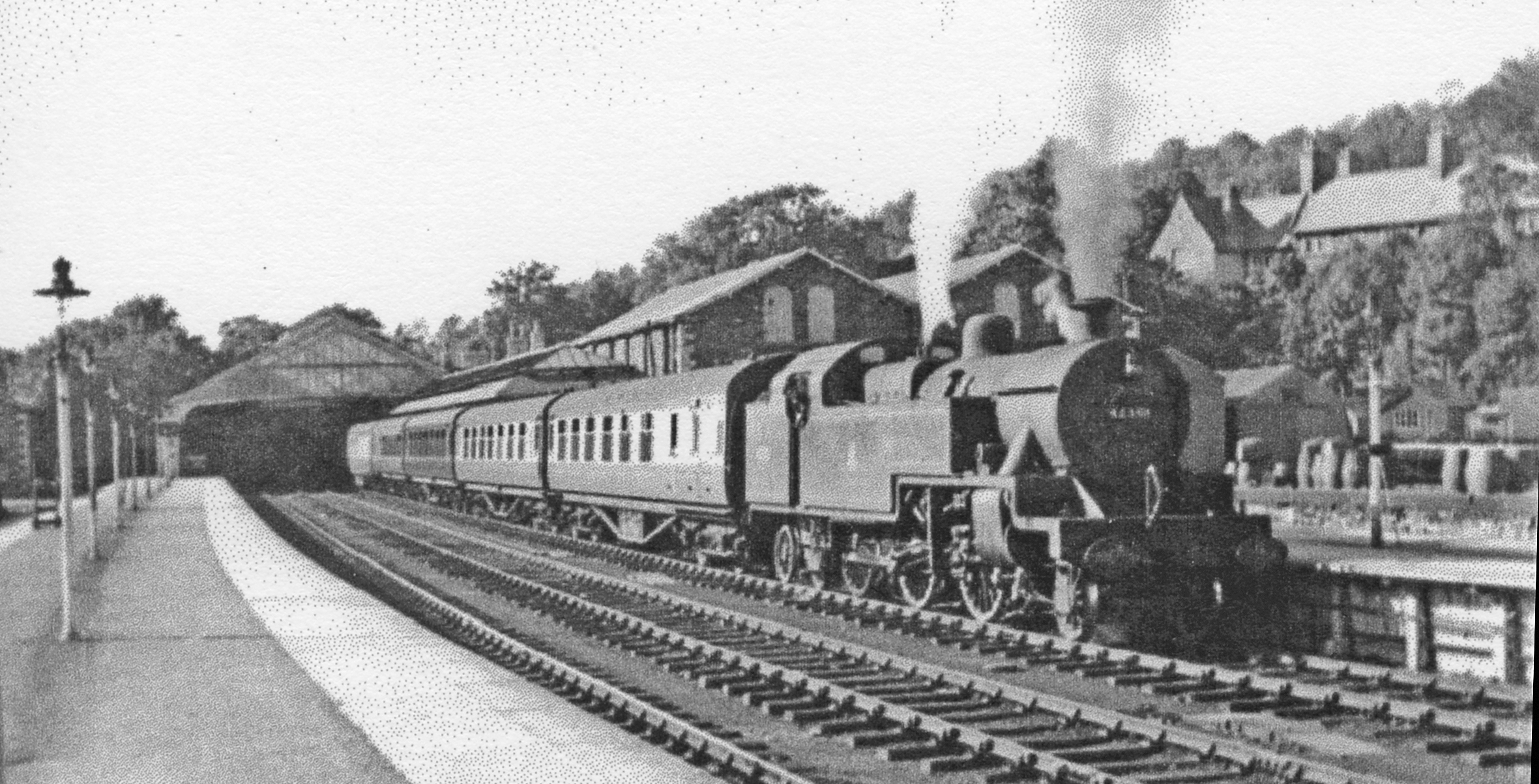
Windermere station in 1951

The line was opened ceremonially on 21 September 1846 at the same time as the L&CR line opened between Lancaster and Kendal Junction. The opening to passenger traffic was on the following day. Until the L&CR line was opened northwards, the line was operated between Lancaster and Kendal. After the opening of the L&CR to Carlisle, some Kendal trains were worked as a shuttle service between Kendal and Oxenholme, a practice perpetuated when the K&WR opened throughout to Windermere, on 20 April 1847. Goods traffic on the Kendal line began on 4 January 1847. The junction station was named Kendal Junction and was an exchange platform not accessible other than to change trains.

== Early operation ==
At first there were five trains a day in each direction between Kendal and Windermere, with extra trips to Oxenholme; but by the summer of 1853 there were six trains each way between Kendal and Windermere and nine return journeys between Kendal and Oxenholme. A passenger carriage was attached to the 16.00 goods train out of Windermere. On special holidays a cheap day return ticket from Kendal to Windermere cost 6d.

The K&WR company was constantly in financial and operational difficulty and petty disagreements with the L&CR, on which it relied for onward journeys were commonplace. By 1848 the K&WR saw that independence was difficult and made overtures to the L&CR to lease or buy the line, but was not received favourably. For ten years there was constant friction. K&WR trains were often late arriving at Oxenholme and main line trains were held until the L&CR grew impatient and told the K&WR to get its trains to the junction ten minutes earlier.

The branch was worked by the London and North Western Railway as part of the pool of rolling stock it made available to the Lancaster and Carlisle Railway. From summer 1850 the working was transferred to E. B. Wilson, of Leeds, until the company took on its own working in November 1851.

The K&WR system was leased in perpetuity to the L&CR from 1 May 1858 and parliamentary ratification took place in the Lancaster and Carlisle Railway Act 1859 (22 & 23 Vict. c. cxxiv) of 13 August 1859 when the L&CR was leased to the LNWR which guaranteed the K&WR shareholders 3 per cent on ordinary shares and 6 per cent on the preference shares. The Kendal and Windermere Railway Company continued as a financial entity until 21 July 1879.

== Development ==
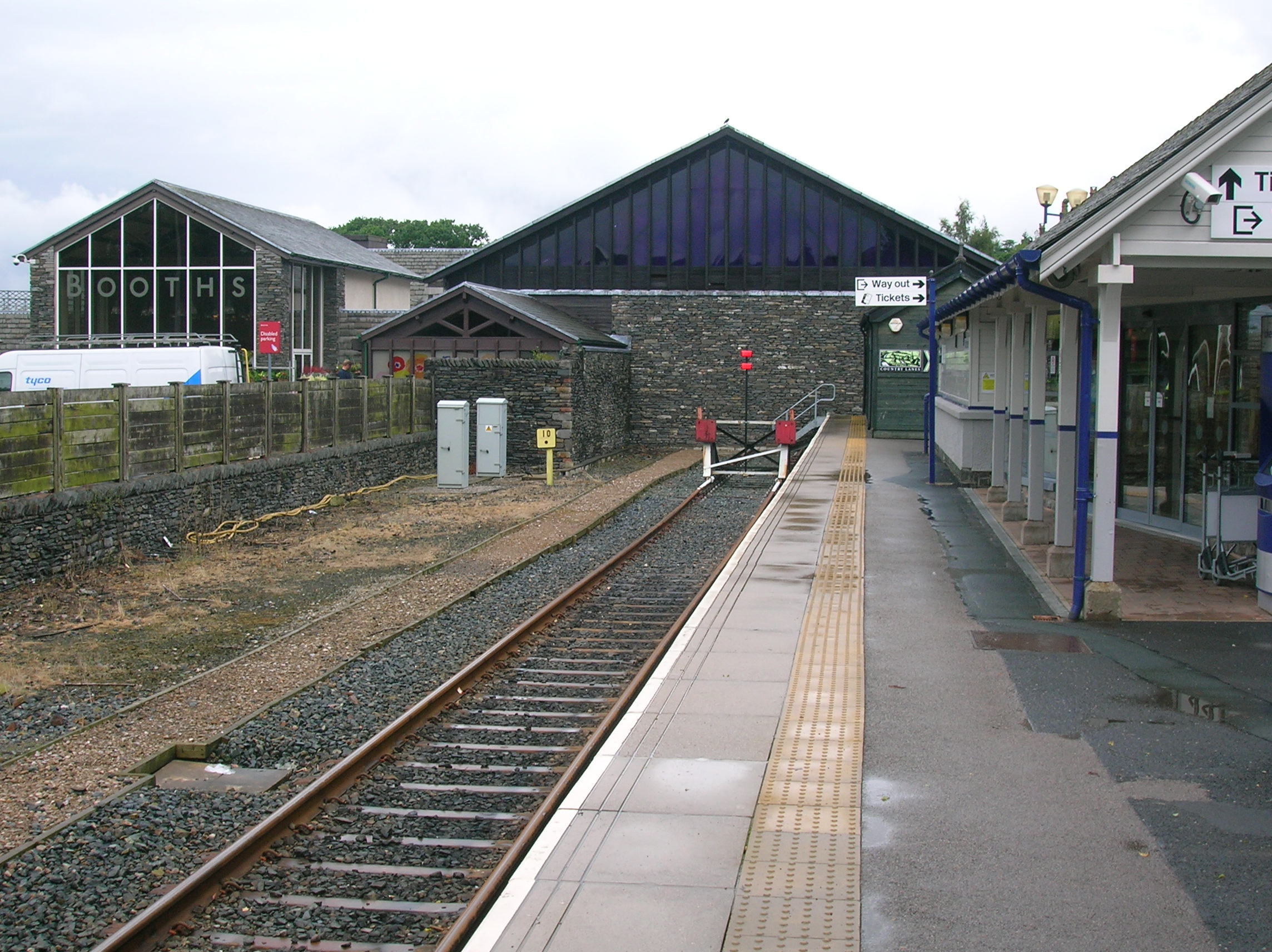
Windermere station in 2008

At first Windermere station stood alone with only the Windermere hotel nearby, but the lake was an attractive destination for visitors and also for residences for the wealthy merchants of Lancashire's industrial towns. The growth of excursion travel and local businesses to support it was phenomenal. On Whit Monday 1883, excursion visitors numbered 8,000 persons. Wealthy merchants were provided with an exclusive club car working in to Windermere on Friday afternoons, but later running each way daily. The vehicle continued in use until 1939.

Kendal station was inadequate and the LNWR reconstructed it in 1861 as "a handsome and substantial structure".

== Decline ==
Although Kendal was an industrial centre, the line could not sustain its importance without the leisure traffic, and that declined in the 1960s. The route was reduced to a single line without a run-round facility at Windermere in 1973, and Joy remarks that:

This created the bizarre situation of excursions having to terminate at Oxenholme and disgorge their passengers on to droves of road coaches while the trains were worked empty over the 50 miles to Carlisle for turning and servicing.

In 1986 the station site at Windermere was simplified, a supermarket was built on the former goods yard and the station was relocated a short distance from its original position.

== Opposition ==
Opposition to the line came from people against what they saw as destruction of the Lake District landscape. They included the poet William Wordsworth. His letters to the editor of the Morning Post are reproduced in The Illustrated Wordsworth's Guide to the Lakes, P. Bicknell, Ed. (Congdon and Weed, New York, 1984), pp. 186–198. His reactions to the technological and "picturesque" incursions of man on his beloved, wild landscape most famously include the following sonnet:

Is then no nook of English ground secure
From rash assault? Schemes of retirement sown
In youth, and 'mid the busy world kept pure
As when their earliest flowers of hope were blown,
Must perish;—how can they this blight endure?
And must he too the ruthless change bemoan
Who scorns a false utilitarian lure
'Mid his paternal fields at random thrown?
Baffle the threat, bright Scene, from Orresthead
Given to the pausing traveller's rapturous glance:
Plead for thy peace, thou beautiful romance
Of nature; and, if human hearts be dead,
Speak, passing winds; ye torrents, with your strong
And constant voice, protest against the wrong.

On the opening of the railway in 1847 one of the contracting engineers, George Heald, wrote an impassioned riposte to Wordsworth accusing him of wanting to obstruct the opportunities the railway would bring. It is dated 15 April 1847, the Locomotive at Orrest Head. He argues for the democratising influence of the railway and the cultural and social benefits it will bring rather than the economic reasons that might be expected from a railway engineer:

Baffle the Rail, bright scene from Orrest Head,
Somewhere in Wordsworth I this line have read;
Who calls on Winds and Torrents fierce and strong
In sound and fury to forbid the wrong.
They heard the call in vain; - on "English ground"
"No sacred nook" has ever yet been found
To scare the dead, when enterprise could throw
A fair surmise, that "flowers of hope" might grow.
Our "earliest flowers" we offer to the Bard,
Although his compliments were rather hard;
"Round his paternal fields at random throw"
No "false" enchantments; but a kindly glow;-
"Utilitarian lures?" – 'tis even so.
To feast upon the "beautiful romance"
"Given to the pausing traveller's rapturous glance,"
Shall be the lot of thousands who shall feel
The vast advantage of a road of steel;
Who 'mongst its pleasing features shall recount,
An easy pilgrimage to Rydal Mount,
"Retirement" "from the busy world, kept pure"
They may admire, but could not well endure;
The Bard need not "the ruthless change bemoan"
When Art flings double charms round Nature's throne.
The Train has stopped it buzzing, roaring wheels,
But the Lake's ripples follow at its heels:
For gliding down its bosom, smooth and clear,
Steamers on Windermere itself appear:-
How shall the Poet's soul "this blight endure!"
His powers will sink! - I fear to rise no more:-
"The rash assault!" "Are humans so dead"
To all that fills a poet with such dread;
As to commit such outrage, and such wrong
In spite of protests which though vain were long?
Come to the bar ye wriggling Rail and Barge
Say if ye can, - Not Guilty! to the charge.
Or why invade the land, (the Plaintiff pleads)
Sacred to solitude, to rocks and weeds;
O'er my "paternal fields" a line to throw
Comes near the darker verge of human woe:
Why give each town-cramp'd soul the sight so grand
To view the peaks that decorate our land?
Speak! - answer why! - or crumble into sand
The Rail and Barge both glory in the deed,
To the impeachment gladly Guilty plead,
But conscious of the bounties they dispense
They offer this, a short and firm defence.
Not to disturb the pure and classic fount
That graceful, flows in ink from Rydal Mount,
But to unite the ground with tamer scenes,
And show to each, that each with beauty teems:
To give the hamlets of the mountain dells
The Arts in which the busy South excells;
To give the South to view the peaks sublime,
That bid defiance to the scythe of time;
To give to town-cramp'd souls the power to soar,
And taste of pleasures never known before:-
WE won our way – through rocks – o'er waters grand,
Opening, (we trust) the beauties of the land.
If from "paternal fields" we take a part,
We pay most handsomely by way of smart;
We give a double value for the slice,
And make the remnant worth a double price.
And for the Bard, - (as Off'ring for our crimes)
We'll give the world to appreciate his rhymes,
The mind will surely place his beauties higher
When read 'mid scenes that did the thoughts inspire,
We'll spread his fame: - what more can he require?
Are not these motives good, and clear, and strong,
Full satisfaction for the sons of song?
Carrying conviction wheresoever read,
Appealing to the heart, as well as head.
Conscious from wrong our cause we have been clearing,
We'll give the Plaintiff good Words,-worth the hearing
The judgement of a jury never fearing.

== See also ==
- History of rail transport in Great Britain
- List of early British railway companies
