= British Rail Class 175 =

Class of diesel multiple unit passenger train

British Rail Class 175 Coradia 1000
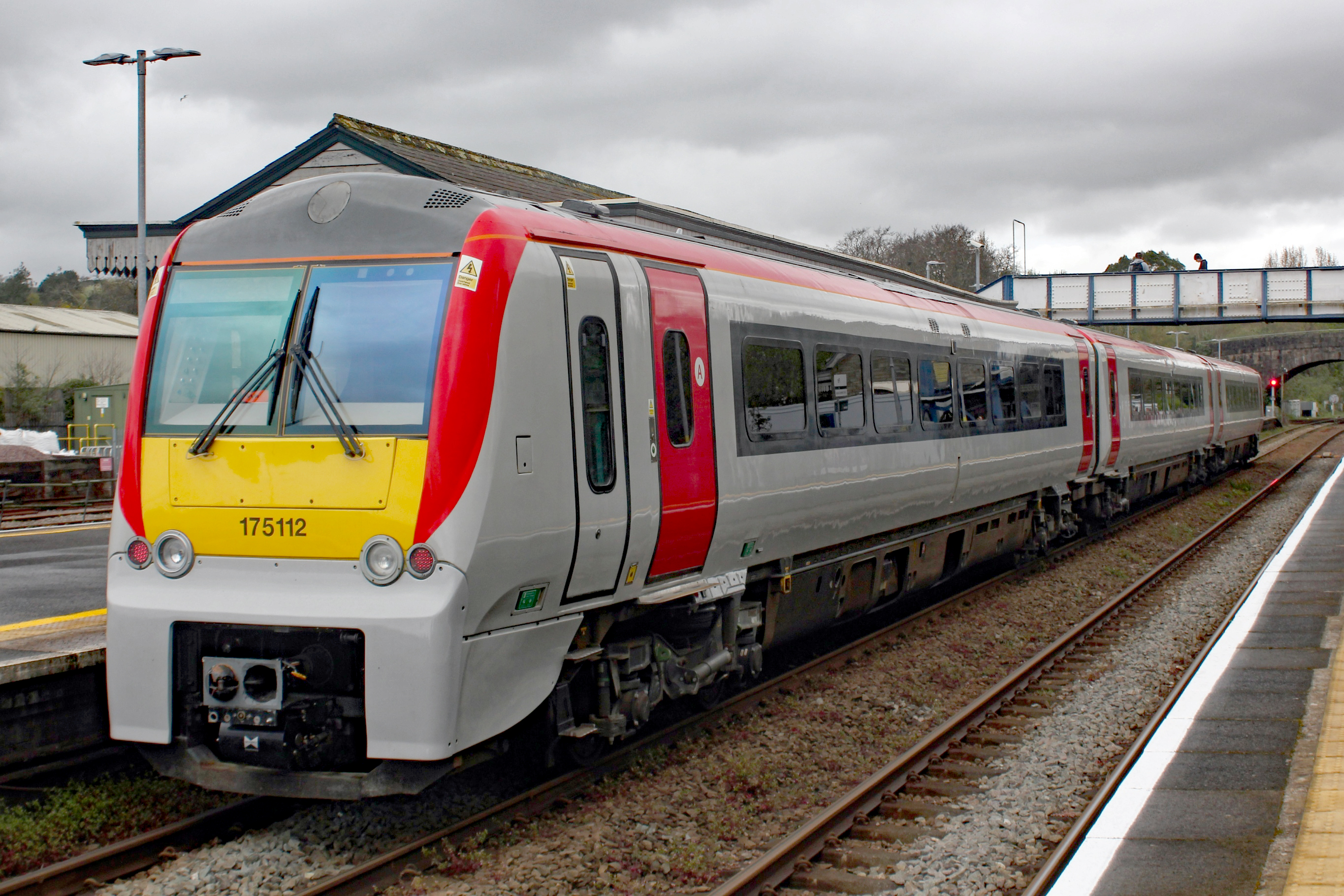
- Great Western Railway 175 at Par

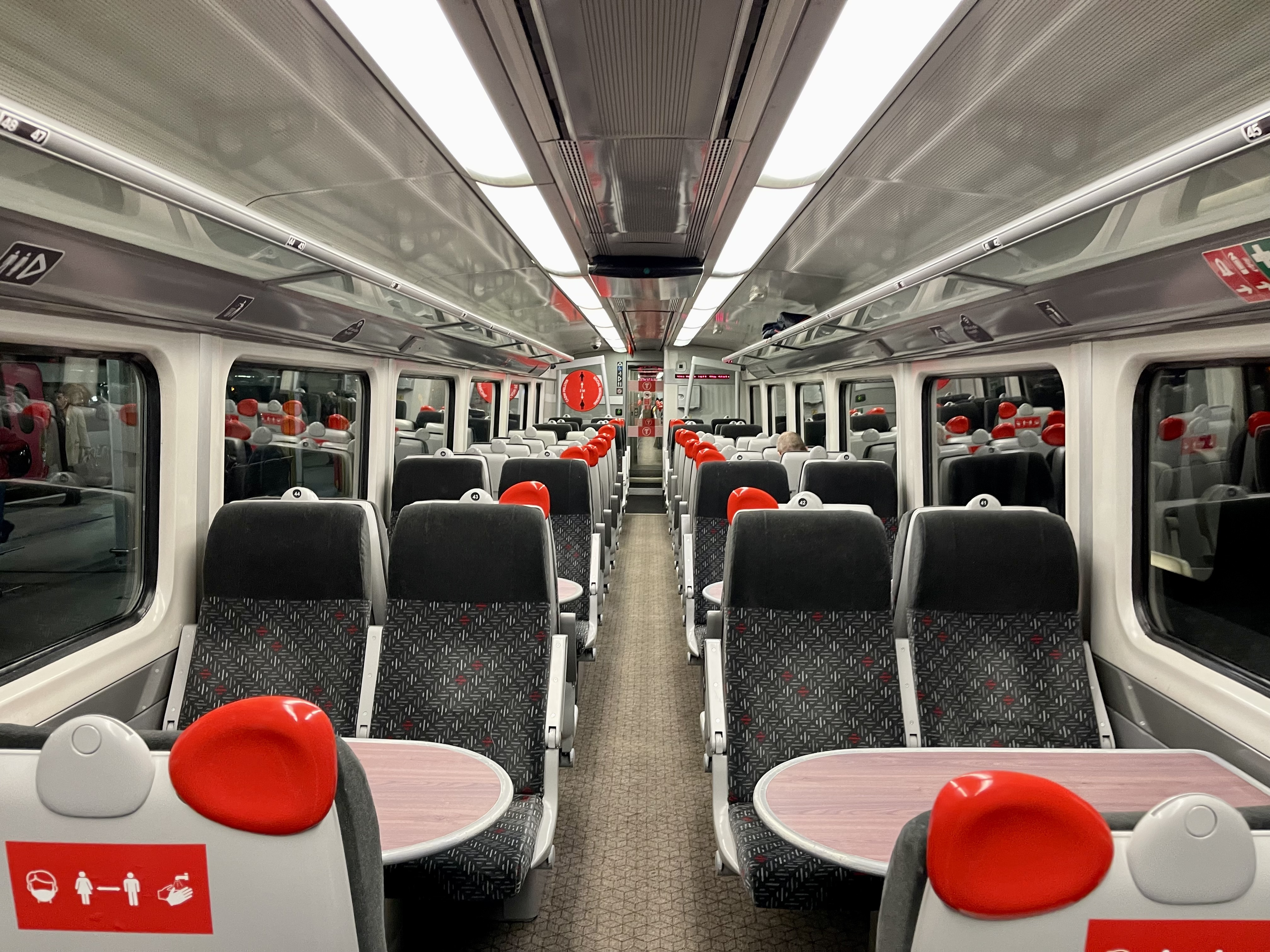
- Interior of a refurbished Transport for Wales Rail Class 175 unit
- In service: GWR: 15 December 2025 – present; Others: 20 June 2000 – 17 October 2023
- Manufacturer: Alstom
- Built at: Washwood Heath, Birmingham
- Family name: Coradia 1000
- Replaced: Class 255; Class 101; Class 309
- Constructed: 1999–2001
- Refurbished: 2019–2022
- Number built: 27
- Number in service: 13
- Successor: Class 185; Class 197
- Formation: 2 cars per 175/0 unit: DMSL-DMSL; 3 cars per 175/1 unit: DMSL-MSL-DMSL
- Fleet numbers: 175/0: 175001–175011; 175/1: 175101–175116
- Capacity: 136 seats per 2-car unit
- Owner: Angel Trains
- Operators: Current: Great Western Railway; Former: Arriva Trains Wales; First North Western; First TransPennine Express; KeolisAmey Wales; Transport for Wales Rail; Wales and Borders
- Depots: Current: Laira; Former: Cardiff; Chester

Specifications
- Car body construction: Steel
- Car length: DMSL vehicles: 23.71 m (77 ft 9 in); MS vehicles: 23.03 m (75 ft 7 in)
- Width: 2.73 m (8 ft 11 in)
- Doors: Single-leaf sliding plug
- Maximum speed: 100 mph (160 km/h)
- Weight: DMSL vehs: 56.51 t (55.62 long tons; 62.29 short tons); MSL vehs: 55.80 t (54.92 long tons; 61.51 short tons); DMSL vehs: 57.50 t (56.59 long tons; 63.38 short tons)
- Axle load: Route Availability 1
- Prime mover: 2 or 3 × Cummins N14E-R (one per vehicle)
- Engine type: Inline-6 4-stroke turbo-diesel
- Displacement: 14 L (855 cu in) per engine
- Power output: 340 kW (450 hp) per engine
- Transmission: Voith T 211 re.3 (hydrokinetic, one per vehicle)
- Braking system: Electro-pneumatic (Note: The units can also be braked by a hydrodynamic retarder fitted to the transmission, but this has been disabled.)
- Safety systems: AWS; TPWS
- Coupling system: Scharfenberg Type 330
- Multiple working: Within class, and with Class 180
- Track gauge: 1,435 mm (4 ft 8 1/2 in) standard gauge

Notes/references
- Sourced from except where otherwise noted.

The British Rail Class 175 Coradia is a type of diesel-hydraulic multiple unit (DHMU) built by French train manufacturer Alstom for their Coradia 1000 platform. Constructed between 1999 and 2001 at Washwood Heath, Birmingham, the first Class 175 entered revenue service with the train operating company First North Western on 20 June 2000.

By 2003, Wales and Borders and then Arriva Trains Wales inherited the fleet; at this point early reliability problems had been mostly resolved. First TransPennine Express also briefly operated several units on hire from ATW. During October 2018, KeolisAmey Wales inherited the fleet and made plans to replace the full fleet. These plans were taken forward when the government-owned Transport for Wales Rail took over in February 2021. The full fleet of Class 175 units returned to their owner, Angel Trains, by the end of 2023.

Their future was uncertain until Great Western Railway signed to lease the fleet in 2024. The units then began to enter service with GWR in December 2025 and into 2026.

== Background ==
During July 1997, the train operating company North Western Trains placed an order reportedly valued at £64 million with the French train manufacturer GEC Alsthom (which in late 1998 would be rebranded as Alstom) for a total of 27 diesel multiple-units, comprising 11 two-carriage units with a top speed of 100 mph (160 km/h), seven three-carriage units with a top speed of 100 mph, and nine three-carriage units with a top speed of 125 mph (200 km/h). The specification called for the train to be a redesign of the Alstom Coradia Juniper family, with considerable emphasis placed on ride smoothness. Their introduction would enable the withdrawal of rolling stock dating back four decades by that point already. Manufacturing was undertaken at Alstom's facility in Washwood Heath, Birmingham.

However, the company subsequently decided to reconfigure the order to instead cover 11 two-carriage and 16 three-carriage units, all of which possessed a maximum speed of 100 mph (160 km/h). In conjunction with the procurement of the new fleet, purpose-built facilities were established to service it at Chester TMD. This new depot was capable of refuelling, cleaning, washing, and performing general maintenance works for the whole Class 175 fleet.

The trains underwent low speed testing at the Severn Valley Railway prior to additional testing and driver training being conducted at the Old Dalby Test Track from November 1999. The first Class 175 entered revenue service on 20 June 2000.

== Description ==
The Class 175 is a long distance diesel multiple-unit (DMU) that was built in either two-carriage or three-carriage configurations. The two-carriage units are numbered 175001–175011, while the three-carriage units 175101–175116. The individual carriages are labelled as coaches A–B–C, with the two-car units lacking a coach B. The interiors were built to a bespoke design specified by the initial operator, North Western Trains.

Various amenities are incorporated into the train. A relatively novel feature at the time was the presence of airline-style at-seat entertainment systems at some seats that enabled passengers with headphones to listen to radio and recorded audio tracks. Various noise-dampening measures were incorporated, such as a floating floor, acoustic ceiling panels, and high levels of insulation, to produce a relatively quiet interior; a low-noise air conditioning system was also fitted. The Class 175 is furnished with a passenger information system, consisting of onboard LED display and audio announcements that communicate both the destinations and arrivals. Each Class 175 has provisions to accommodate two disabled passengers in coach A, as well as for the storage for two bicycles in coach C.

The exterior of the Class 175 has been designed for improved aerodynamics over preceding rolling stock; it is equipped with a skirted underside and has been shaped to minimise exterior noise. Its launch operator stated that the train possessed both reduced drag and improved fuel efficiency over its existing rolling stock. The suspension system involved a dual air-and-spring arrangement that has been claimed to provide a smoother ride than the British Rail Class 465.

== Operations ==
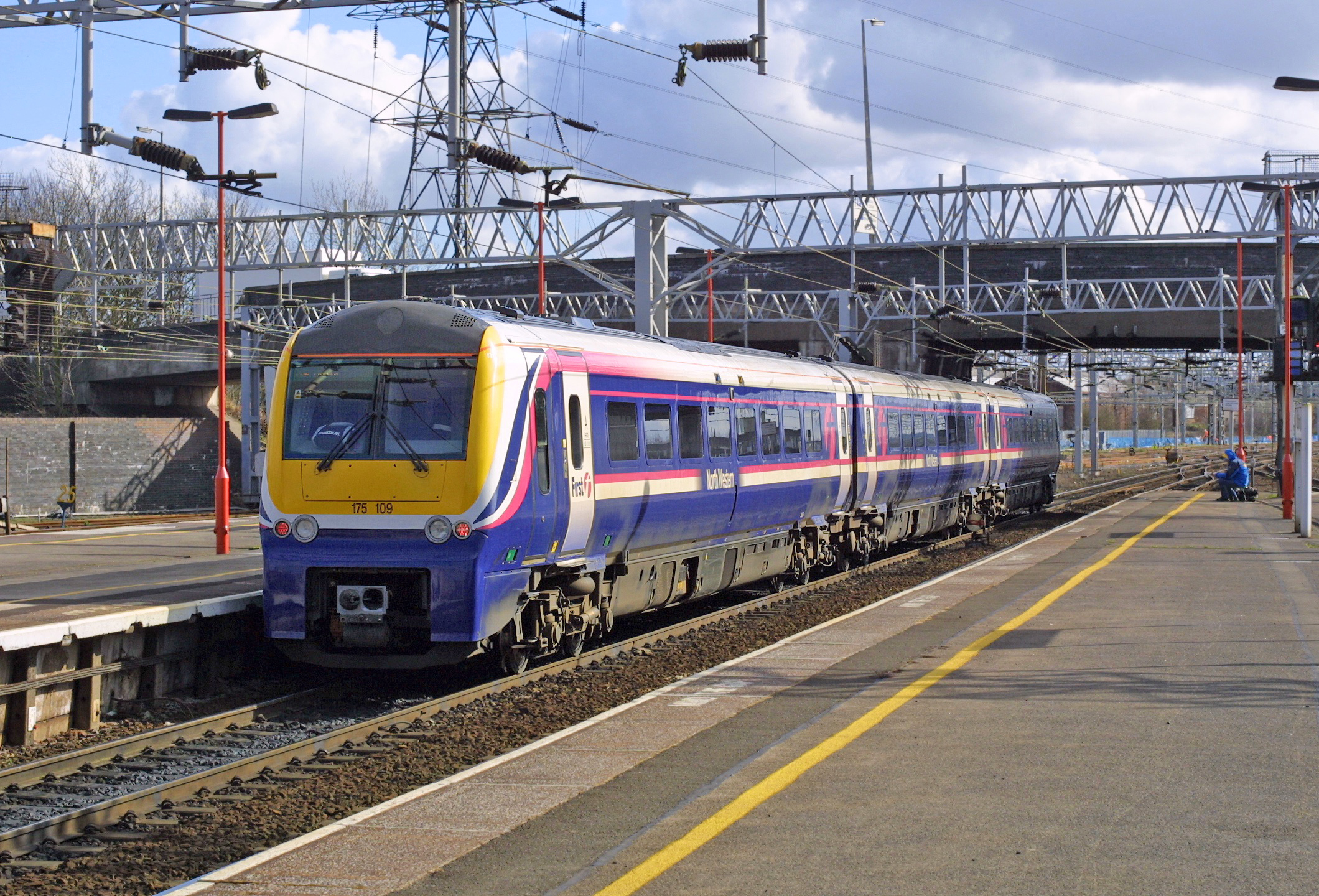
First North Western Class 175 at Stafford in 2003

=== First North Western ===
The Class 175 fleet was initially operated by First North Western (FNW), which placed them on routes serving Birmingham New Street, Crewe and Manchester to Llandudno, Holyhead, Barrow-in-Furness and Windermere. The type quickly displaced the elderly rolling stock that had been used on these routes, such as locomotive-hauled rakes of British Railways Mark 1 carriages.

Early operations of the Class 175 were troubled by low unit availability on account of reliability problems; several services were substituted for by older locomotive-hauled trains at short notice. To address these issues, the fleet was subject to remedial work, which was largely centred around improvements to the performance of the brakes and bogies. These changes were reportedly successful, having resulted in the reliability of the trains improving substantially.

=== Wales & Borders franchise ===
As part of a restructure of franchise areas, during October 2003, FNW's services on the North Wales Coast Line from Birmingham and Manchester to Llandudno and Holyhead were transferred to the Wales & Borders franchise. All 27 Class 175s were transferred to Wales & Borders, who then sublet 11 to FNW. This arrangement was maintained following FNW's Manchester to Barrow and Windermere services being transferred to First TransPennine Express (FTPE) in February 2004. After FTPE took delivery of Class 185 DMUs, this arrangement ceased during December 2006.

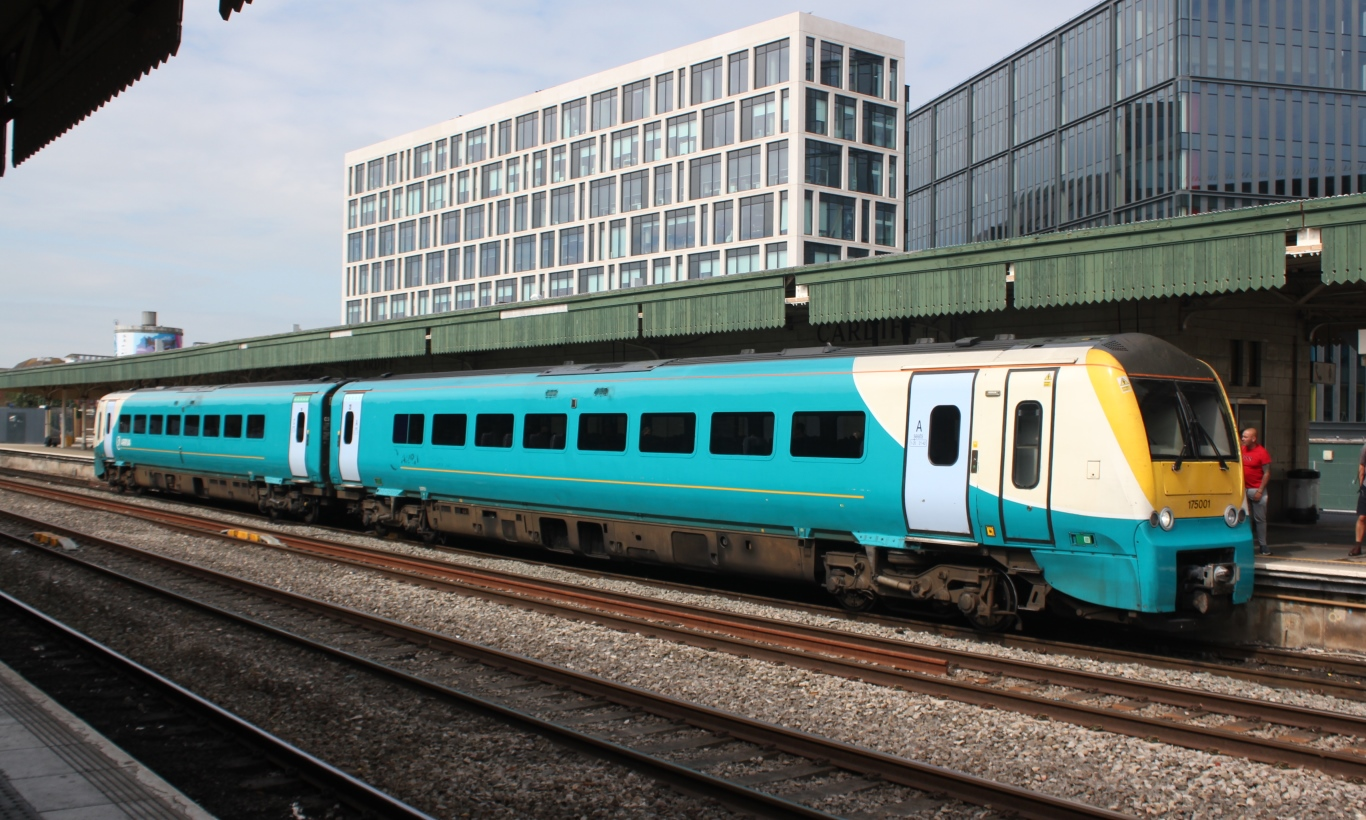
Arriva Trains Wales Class 175 at Cardiff Central in 2018

During December 2003, all of the Class 175s were transferred along with the Wales & Borders franchise to the new franchisee Arriva Trains Wales. Their sphere of operations was promptly extended to South Wales via the Welsh Marches Line, serving destinations such as Cardiff, Swansea, Pembroke Dock,Fishguard and Milford Haven. In October 2018, the fleet passed with the franchise to KeolisAmey Wales; earlier that same year, the operator had announced its plans to replace the Class 175 with new-build Class 197 DMUs by 2023.

In 2019, a comprehensive refurbishment of the Class 175 fleet commenced. Performed at Alstom's Widnes facility, this work saw various improved amenities being installed for passengers, such as re-covered seats, the addition of at-seat USB and electrical sockets, new carpets throughout, and various other new interior fittings; a new external livery was also applied. Refurbishment of the last unit was reportedly completed in January 2022. During February 2021, operation of the Class 175s was transferred along with the franchise to the Welsh Government-owned operator Transport for Wales Rail.

TfW Rail began to wind down its fleet of Class 175s in February 2023, with the placing into storage of 175002 and 175005. These units, along with three more (two of which had been damaged by fire in February 2023) were returned to lessor Angel Trains in May 2023. The last of the class were withdrawn by the end of 2023, being replaced by Class 197 DMUs.

=== Great Western Railway ===
In August 2024, Rail Express reported that Great Western Railway were planning to lease the Class 175 fleet, and this was confirmed in November 2024 when the company formally signed the lease for the fleet, with a plan for the fleet to enter service in December 2025. The first example, 175002, was delivered on 27 November 2024. On 10 March 2025, FirstGroup and Great Western Railway officially confirmed the lease of 26 units out of the 27 units in the Class 175 fleet with an introduction on Devon and Cornwall services expected later that year with the full fleet expected to be in operation by the end of 2026.

In December 2025, GWR entered their first Class 175 set into service following the withdrawal of their Class 255 Castle sets a couple days prior. This was unit 175001, which operated the 1340 Plymouth to Penzance and return 1552 service. Going into 2026, more Class 175 units were gradually introduced into service between Exeter, Plymouth and Penzance and the summer timetable change that year also saw them introduced onto the Par to Newquay branch line too as part of the Mid Cornwall Metro project.

As the summer timetable went on and more of the units entered service with GWR, there was a high level of reliability issues with the fleet and this saw a heavy impact on performance on GWR services in Devon and Cornwall throughout the summer of 2026. These issues led GWR to reduce their timetable in September 2026 with removal of certain services between Exeter, Plymouth and Penzance. GWR also introduced a new program in which each Class 175 unit had to operate 1,000 miles in simulated passenger operation without any major faults before they could re-enter revenue earning service.

== Accidents and incidents ==
On 16 January 2010, unit 175103 operating the 08:30 service from Manchester Piccadilly to Milford Haven struck two cars at Moreton-on-Lugg crossing between Hereford and Leominster. The front seat passenger in one of the cars was fatally injured, although there were no casualties on the train. The train did not derail. The signaller had raised the barriers in error when the train was approaching the crossing, and he was arrested on suspicion of manslaughter in July 2010; he was convicted of charges under health and safety legislation following a trial at Birmingham Crown Court in 2013, and was fined £1,750 and ordered to carry out 275 hours of community service.

The same service collided with a trailer on the Morfa Main level crossing near Kidwelly on 31 January 2011. No-one was injured, but the unit involved, 175108, received nearly £82,000 worth of damage due to striking the trailer at 75 miles per hour (121 km/h). The farmer in charge of the trailer was sentenced to a 36-week suspended jail sentence and was ordered to carry out 200 hours of community work.

On 19 December 2011, unit 175002 collided with a lorry at the Llanboidy level crossing near Whitland. The train was operating the service from Milford Haven to Manchester Piccadilly and the driver of the lorry was arrested on suspicion of endangering safety.

Class 175 units have caught fire in 2004 at Preston (175008), 2009 at Prestatyn, 2011 at Manchester Piccadilly, 2017 both at Shrewsbury (175109) and between Chester and Crewe, 2018 at Deganwy, and in 2019 both near Pontrilas (175107) and at Gowerton (175102).

In February 2018, following the discovery of a number of instances of damaged wheels on Class 175 units, the entire fleet was temporarily withdrawn from service for safety checks. After further investigation, it was found that a track fault between Newport and Cwmbran had caused wheel damage to several trains, not only Class 175s but also some Class 158s.

On 8 February 2023, Transport for Wales Rail unit 175008 was travelling from Holyhead to Cardiff Central when the North Wales Fire and Rescue Service and Network Rail were alerted to a fire aboard the train. This was followed by two further fires, both at Wilmslow, on 22 February and 1 March 2023. All three fires were attributed to a build-up of "debris, leaf litter, and other contaminants" in the units' under-floor engine bays; CAF, who had taken over Chester Traincare Centre from Alstom, had stopped periodic underframe cleaning of the units, and had to implement a remediation programme. Acknowledging that the three incidents in quick succession would "raise concerns", TfW Rail decided on 2 March to temporarily withdraw from service all Class 175 units that had not been through the cleaning programme. This caused disruption to TfW operations, though the level of disruption reduced in the following days as cleaned units returned to service. A further remediation includes replacement of the engines' intercoolers.

== Fleet details ==
Class	Operator	Qty.	Year built	Cars per unit	Unit nos.
175/0	Great Western Railway	7	1999–2001	2	175001-175003, 175006-175007, 175009-175011
175/0	Stored	2	1999–2001	2	175004-175005
175/0	Stored	1	1999–2001	1	175008 (Note: Undamaged driving vehicle 50751 given to unit 175101)
175/1	Great Western Railway	6	1999–2001	3	175101, 175111-175112, 175113-175115
175/1	Stored	11	1999–2001	3	175102-175110, 175116 (Note: 175101 Contains driving vehicle 50751 from 175008)

=== Named units ===
Some of the class have received names:

- 175003 - Eisteddfod Genedlaethol Cymru
- 175004 - Mencap - Pengwern College
- 175006 - Brondyffryn Trust
- 175008 - Valhalla Blackpool Pleasure Beach
- 175103 - Mum
- 175105 - Bruce
- 175107 - Coronation Street Rovers Return
- 175111 - Brief Encounter
- 175112 - South Lakes Wild Animal Park - Sumatran Tiger
- 175114 - Manchester 2002 - Commonwealth Cruiser
- 175116 - Peter V. L. Jones, Community Rail Officer Conwy Valley Line

All except for Eisteddfod Genedlaethol Cymru were named by First North Western. The nameplates were all removed in 2009 when the fleet was repainted into Arriva Trains Wales livery.

== Sources ==
- Marsden, Colin J. (2011). Traction Recognition (2nd ed.). Ian Allan Publishing. ISBN 978-0-7110-3494-5. OCLC 751525080. OL 26823660M. Wikidata Q112224327.
