= 0N =

0N (zero N) or 0-N may refer to:

- 0N or 0°N, an expression of the latitude of the equator
- Zero norm in mathematics
- HP 0N, ISO/IEC 8859-1 character set on printers by Hewlett-Packard0ñ

== See also ==
- N0 (disambiguation)
- On (disambiguation)
