= On =

On, on, or ON may refer to:

== Language ==
- On, a Basque-language honorific equivalent to Spanish Don (honorific)
- On, a preposition
- On, one of the French personal pronouns

== Arts and entertainment ==
=== Music ===
- On (band), a solo project of Ken Andrews
- On (EP), a 1993 EP by Aphex Twin
- On (Echobelly album), 1995
- On (Gary Glitter album), 2001
- On (Imperial Teen album), 2002
- On (Elisa album), 2006
- On (Jean album), 2006
- On (Boom Boom Satellites album), 2006
- On (Tasmin Archer album), 2006
- On (Tau album), 2017
- "On" (song), a 2020 song by BTS
- "On", a song by Bloc Party from the 2006 album A Weekend in the City
- "On", a song by Anson Lo, 2023

=== Other media ===
- Ön, a 1966 Swedish film
- On (Japanese prosody), the counting of sound units in Japanese poetry
- On (novel), by Adam Roberts
- On-chan, a mascot of Hokkaido Television Broadcasting

== Businesses and organizations ==
=== Broadcasters ===
- ONdigital, a failed British digital television service, later called ITV Digital
- Ongehoord Nederland, a Dutch public broadcaster
- Overmyer Network, a former US television network

=== Other businesses and organizations ===
- On (company), a Swiss athletic shoe and sportswear company
- ON Semiconductor, a semiconductor manufacturing company
- Nauru Airlines (IATA airline designator ON)
- Ordine Nuovo, Italian fascist group
- Orka náttúrunnar (ON Power), Icelandic geothermal power company
- OS/Net, the OpenSolaris Community

== Places ==
- On (Ancient Egypt), a Hebrew form of the ancient Egyptian name of Heliopolis
- On, Wallonia, a village now part of the municipality of Marche-en-Famenne
- Ahn, Luxembourg, known in Luxembourgish as On
- Ontario, a Canadian province
- On, Egyptian name of Heliopolis

== Science, technology, and mathematics ==
=== Biology and medicine ===
- Operative note, documentation of care relating to an operation
- Optic neuritis, especially relevant in multiple sclerosis
- Osteonecrosis, death of bone tissue
- Osteonectin, a glycoprotein

=== Other uses in science, technology, and mathematics ===
- O'Nan group, a mathematical group
- On, the proper class of all ordinal numbers

== Other uses ==
- On (biblical figure), son of Peleth
- On Kawara, Japanese artist
- Old Norse, a North Germanic language commonly referenced in etymology
- Ontology, a branch of philosophy that deals with the concept of being
- On'yomi, reading of Japanese kanji characters
- Order of the Nation, a Jamaican honour
- Overground Network, a railway scheme in South London
- ON convoys, a series of WWII trade convoys

== See also ==
- O(n)
- Yōon
