= British Rail brand names =

Aspect of branding in Great Britain's railway network (c. 1965–1993)

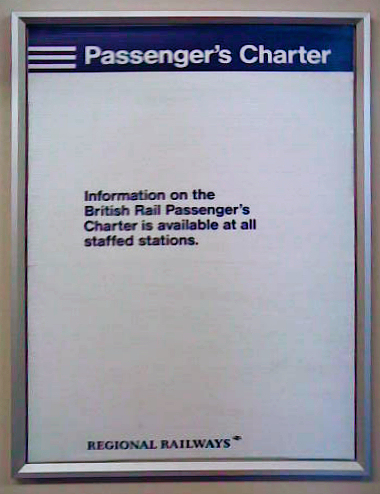
Regional Railways branding on an in-train poster, still displayed by default in 2007

British Rail was the brand image of the nationalised railway owner and operator in Great Britain, the British Railways Board, used from 1965 until its breakup and sell-off from 1993 onwards.

From an initial standardised corporate image, several sub-brands emerged for marketing purposes and later in preparation for privatisation. These brands covered rail networks, customers services and several classes of new trains.

With the size of British Rail's fleet, due to the time required to repaint rolling stock, brand switchovers could be lengthy affairs, often lasting years. This worsened into privatisation, with the same services using trains using three or four different liveries.

Following privatisation, most of the brand names disappeared, although some such as ScotRail, Merseyrail, Eurostar and Freightliner still exist today.

The double-arrow symbol, which was the symbol of British Rail from 1965, still remains after privatisation as a unifying branding device used by the privatised National Rail network. It is shown on most tickets, stations, timetables, publicity and road signs indicating stations, but not trains. It is, however, set to be used more generally once again by Great British Railways.

== Timeline of brands ==
Under the Transport Act 1962, responsibility for the state railway operation, British Railways, was transferred from being a trade name and subsidiary of the British Transport Commission, to a separate public corporation, under the British Railways Board.

As the last steam locomotives were being withdrawn by 1968, under the 1955 Modernisation Plan, the corporation's public name was rebranded in 1965 as British Rail, which introduced the double-arrow symbol, a standard typeface named Rail Alphabet and the BR blue livery, which was applied to nearly all locomotives and rolling stock.

The first major BR sub-brand to appear was InterCity. This was augmented with the InterCity 125 brand in 1976, in conjunction with the introduction of the InterCity 125 High Speed Train.

In the 1980s under sectorisation, blue livery was phased out as the organisation converted from a regional structure to being sector-based. The InterCity brand was relaunched and passenger brands Network SouthEast and Regional Railways introduced; these divisions introduced many sub-brands. Freight operations were split into the Trainload Freight, Railfreight Distribution and Rail Express Systems sectors.

In the late 1980s and early 1990s, new multiple-unit train designs being introduced to replace rolling stock also brought new brand names; these were often linked to other branding exercises, such as the Networker which was built for Network SouthEast.

In the 1990s, BR created the European Passenger Services division to run passenger services through the Channel Tunnel, under the Eurostar brand. After construction delays, this was operated from 1994, until it passed to the London and Continental Railways consortium in 1996 as Eurostar.

In preparation for privatisation, the freight sectors were further split into smaller business functions; these were as regional splits of Trainload Freight or further splits along customer market, such as inter-modal traffic, each with their own branding. With almost all freight businesses going straight to EWS, most of these brands were short lived.

== List of brands ==
=== Networks ===
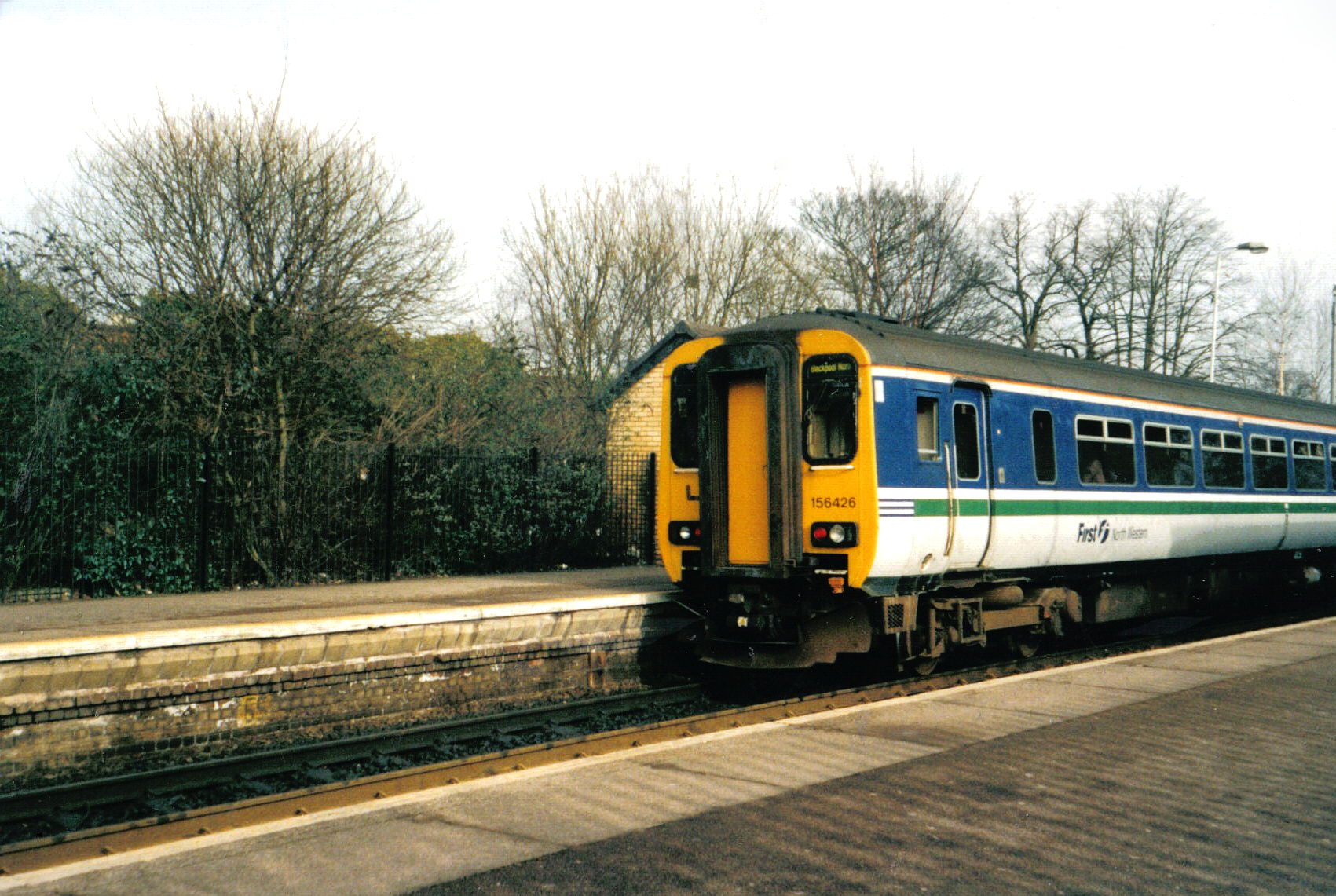
A First North Western Class 156 at Romiley station, near Manchester, in 2001. It is painted in its former Network NorthWest Regional Railways livery

- Island Line - passenger services on the Isle of Wight (Ryde - Shanklin) from 1989. Part of Network SouthEast
- Merseyrail - a passenger service brand for Merseyside
- Network NorthWest - passenger service brand paralleling Network SouthEast for Greater Manchester and Lancashire, introduced in 1989 as part of Regional Railways. After a few years, it was replaced by the Regional Railways branding
- Network SouthEast (originally London & South Eastern) - commuter and medium-distance trains operating in an area bounded roughly by King's Lynn, Peterborough, Worcester, Bedwyn, Exeter and Weymouth and included the Waterloo & City line, which is now part of the London Underground
- Regional Railways (originally Provincial) - other passenger services in England and Wales, often suffixed by a regional description, e.g. Regional Railways North West
- Ryde Rail - passenger services on the Isle of Wight (Ryde - Shanklin) 1985–1989. Part of Network SouthEast from 1987.
- ScotRail - passenger services within Scotland (officially part of Regional Railways, but with a distinct identity)
- Strathclyde Transport - brand operated by ScotRail on behalf of Strathclyde Regional Council. Strathclyde transport operating commuter services within Greater Glasgow and the wider Strathclyde area; it had its own distinct livery (orange/black from 1983, carmine/cream from 1997 onward). The brand survived privatisation and was later shortened to SPT; it disappeared completely when responsibility for co-ordinating rail services was taken away from SPT following the Transport (Scotland) Act 2005 when Strathclyde Passenger Transport Executive (and Authority), along with the WESTRANS voluntary regional transport partnership, were replaced by the Strathclyde Partnership for Transport
- Tynerail and Tynerider - passenger service brand for Tyneside (pre-Tyne & Wear Metro).

=== Express passenger services ===
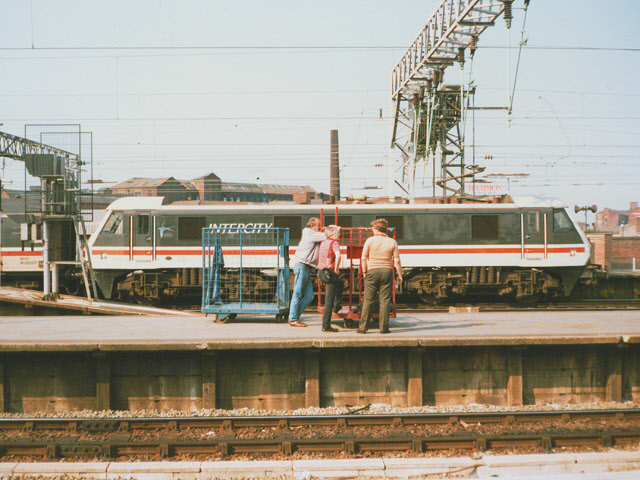
Class 90 at Manchester Piccadilly, in InterCity's Swallow livery

- Alphaline - sub-brand of Regional Railways, for regional express services on secondary routes, operated using 90 mph Class 158 trains, complementing the InterCity network
- Eurostar - an international high speed passenger train service connecting London with Paris and Brussels through the Channel Tunnel, using Network SouthEast main line tracks in England
- InterCity - high-speed express trains connecting major towns and cities
- TransPennine Express - sub-brand of Regional Railways, for regional express services on secondary routes in the North East, complementing the InterCity network.

=== Other services ===
- Motorail - long-distance passenger services that also carried cars (operated as part of InterCity)
- Pullman - first class carriages in InterCity trains, offering a full at-seat catering service (mainly marketed to business travellers)
- Railair - through ticketing service for coach links to airports
- Sealink - ferry services.

=== Freight services ===
- Rail Express Systems - Royal Mail Post Office and parcels services
- Red Star Parcels - express parcel delivery
- Trainload Freight - whole-train services, divided into sub-sectors covering Coal, Construction, Metals and Petroleum
- Freightliner - container services
- Speedlink - wagonload services.

=== Rolling stock classes ===
Brand name		Unit Classes
Diesel Units
Blue Pullman		251
Trans-Pennine		124
Heritage		100 to 131
InterCity 125 (or High Speed Train)		253, 254 (later Class 43 and Mark 3 hauled coaching stock)
Pacer (or Skipper on Western Region)		140, 141, 142, 143, 144
Sprinter family	Sprinter	150
Sprinter family	Super-Sprinter	153, 155, 156
Sprinter family	'Express-Sprinter' or 'Express'	158
Sprinter family	South Western Turbo	159 (Network SouthEast)
Networker family	Networker Turbo	165
Networker family	Networker Express Turbo	166
Networker family	Clubman (Note: The Clubman was never operated by British Rail. Network SouthEast planned it for their new service to Birmingham, via the Chiltern Main Line, and nicknamed it the Clubman; however, privatisation intervened. In 1996, new private operators Chiltern Railways (former Chiltern Line managers) ordered five Class 168/0s, which were only cosmetically different from the units planned by NSE.)	168
Electric Units
Advanced Passenger Train		370
Blue Train		303, 311
Clacton Express		309
Eurostar		373
InterCity 225 (Note: The InterCity 225 is not a multiple unit; sets are made up of a single Class 91 electric locomotive, nine Mark 4 coaches and a Mark 4 Driving Van Trailer.)		91 and Mark 4 hauled coaching stock
Networker family		365, 465, 466
Wessex Electric		442
