= Network NorthWest =

Regional passenger sector of British Rail

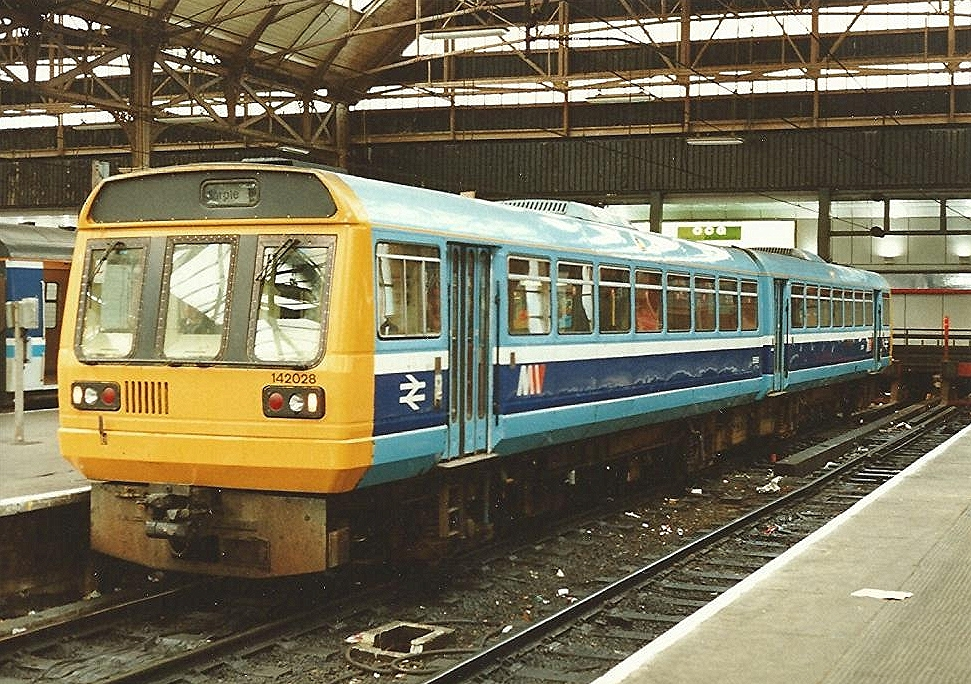
- Class 142 at Manchester Piccadilly in Network NorthWest/BR Provincial livery
- Main regions: Manchester, North West England
- Parent company: Regional Railways

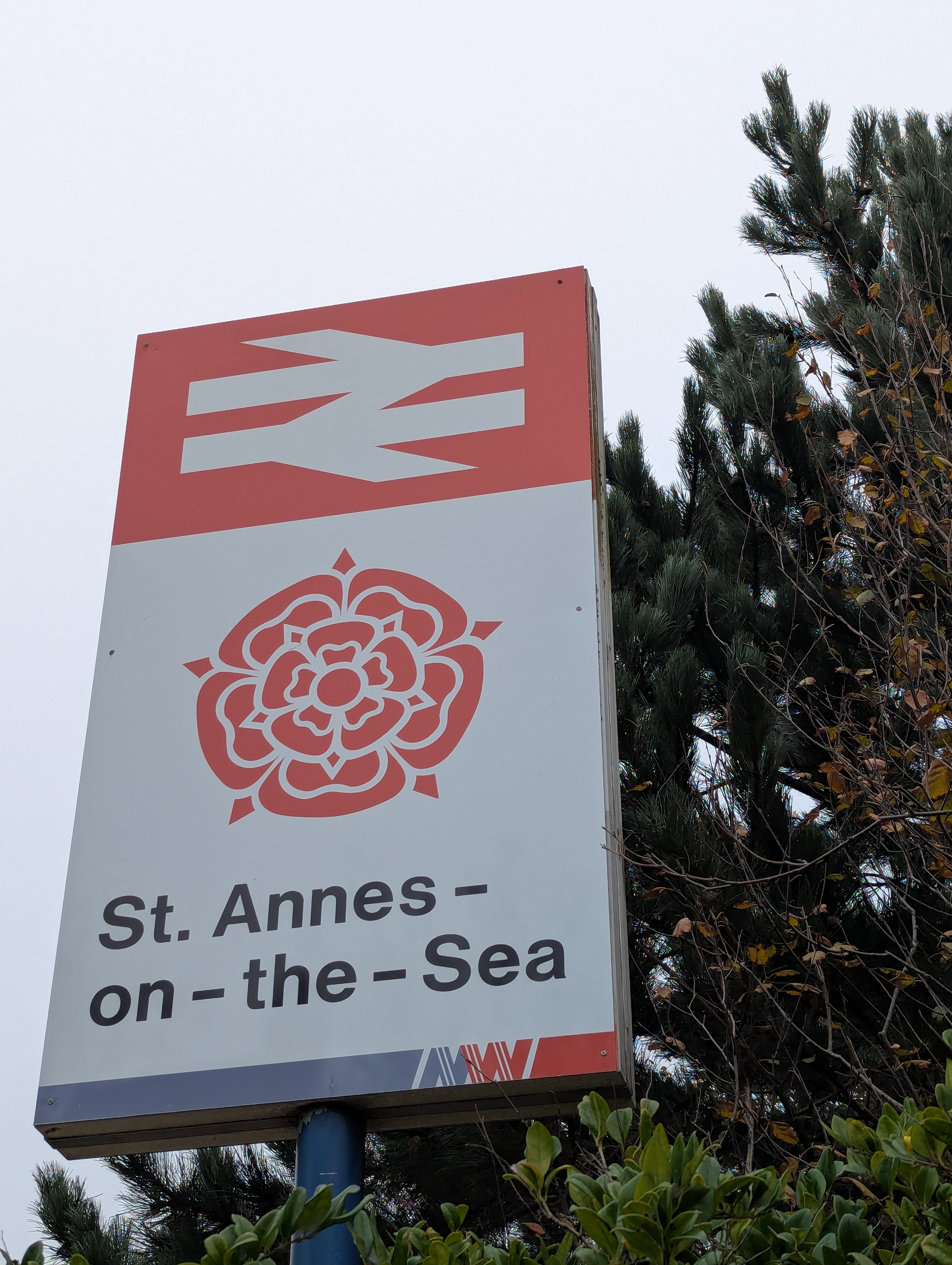
A Network NorthWest sign at St. Annes-on-the-Sea

Network NorthWest was a brand name of British Rail which was applied for a short period to the provincial railway network in North West England. It was launched in 1989 during British Rail's sectorisation programme which created distinct brand identities for regional sub-divisions.

The Network NorthWest name mirrored the larger Network SouthEast brand which had been rolled out on the rail network around London and the South East of England since 1982. Network NorthWest promoted suburban and regional railway services centred on Manchester and was jointly funded by British Rail, the Greater Manchester Passenger Transport Executive and Lancashire County Council. Some Network NorthWest services overlapped with those of neighbouring Merseyrail, another British Rail regional network which was centred on Liverpool.

== History ==
The public launch of the brand took place on 4 April 1989 at an event hosted by television presenter Stuart Hall at the Manchester Museum of Science and Industry, sited around the former Manchester Liverpool Road railway station. Invited guests travelled on a special train formed of a Class 150 from the museum to Chorley, then back from Adlington (Lancashire) to Manchester Oxford Road. Souvenir tickets were issued for the journey. The Provincial sector of British Rail, which was responsible for the new network, then ran a series of roadshows in town centres across northwest England in June and July 1989 to increase public awareness of the brand.

With effect from 15 May 1989, when the summer 1989 timetable was introduced, all rail services operated by the Provincial sector of British Rail across a large area of northwest England were marketed and operated under the Network NorthWest name. The area was bounded by Shotton, Runcorn, Warrington Central, Wigan North Western, Southport (via Parbold), Blackpool South, Blackpool North, Wennington, Colne, Littleborough, Greenfield, Hadfield, Grindleford, Buxton, Congleton and Crewe. The Wigan Wallgate–Kirkby and Preston–Ormskirk branches were also included, but the West Coast Main Line between Crewe and Wigan North Western was excluded because it was run by the InterCity sector. (Note: This left three gaps between the Network NorthWest area and the Merseyrail network: Warrington Central–Hough Green, Bryn–Garswood and Ormskirk–Maghull. The Merseyrail area could be reached via Southport or Kirkby though.)

Also introduced at this time were two one-day Rail Rover tickets allowing unlimited off-peak travel in either the full Network NorthWest area (at £7.60, with reductions for children and Railcard holders) or a smaller zone described as the "central area" (£3.80). Ticket issuing facilities at stations were also overhauled during the Network NorthWest era: some stations were destaffed or saw reductions in ticket office opening hours, the new APTIS and SPORTIS systems were installed at many stations, and three types of self-service ticket issuing system were trialled at various locations.

From 15 May 1990, the Merseyrail area was added to Network NorthWest, and additional Rover tickets were introduced to cover various parts of the network. A Rover covering the whole enlarged area cost £10.90.

Network NorthWest was a short-lived venture and few examples remain of the Network NorthWest brand today. Network NorthWest was eventually absorbed into the Regional Railways operation prior to the privatisation of British Rail and the brand disappeared from use. After privatisation, railway services in the Network NorthWest zone were taken over by North Western Trains and subsequently operated by Northern Rail, Arriva Rail North and Northern Trains, while two local lines were taken into the Manchester Metrolink light rail system.

== Branding and rolling stock ==
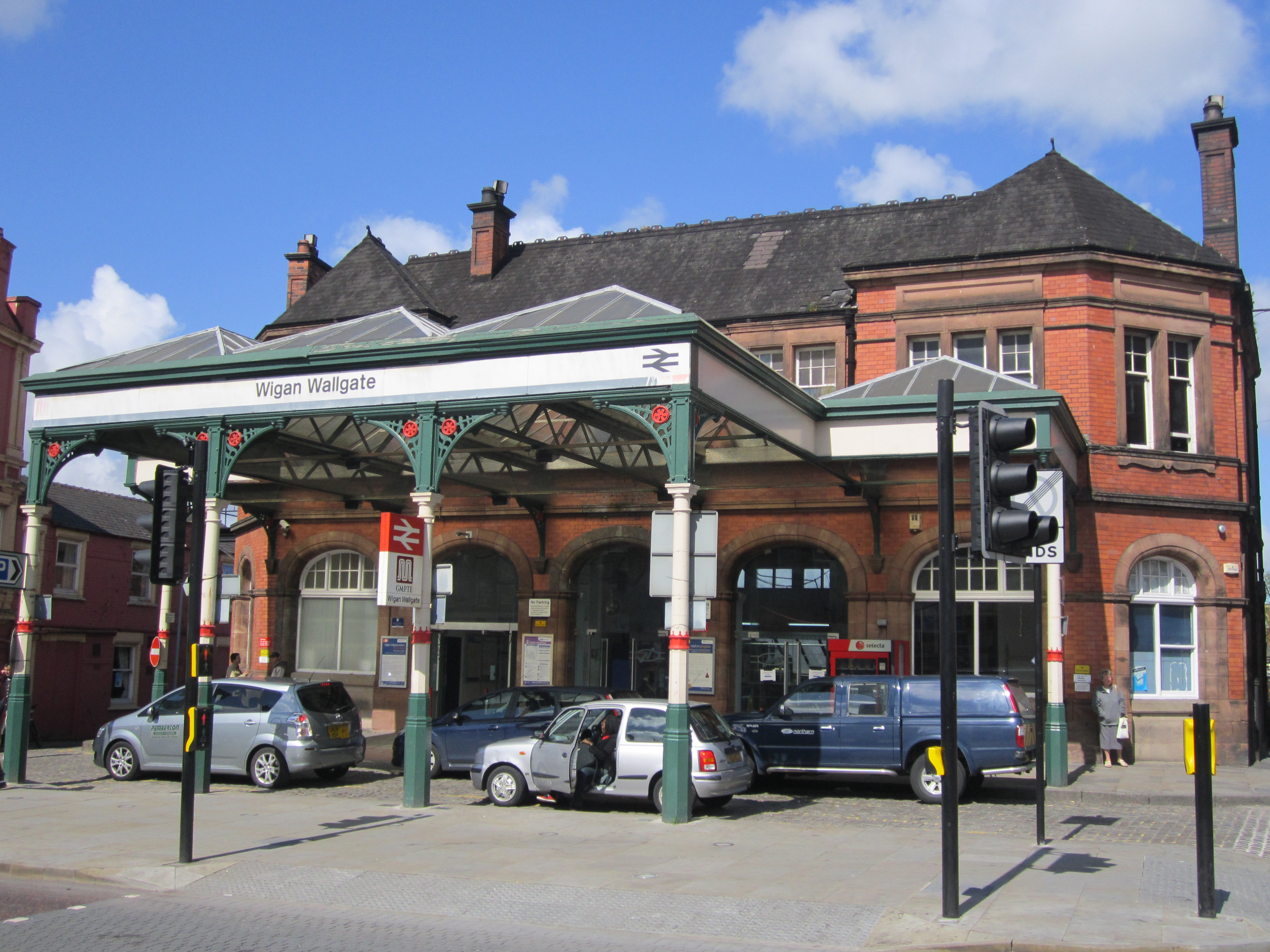
Network NorthWest branding at Wigan Wallgate in 2012

Network NorthWest featured a red and grey NW logo which was applied to publicity, timetables, station signage and some rolling stock across the region. The limited NorthWest provincial train livery was a blue upper body, light grey lower body and a red and grey bodyside stripe with an "NW" Logo. The livery was applied to a number of Class 150 Sprinters serving routes in and out of Manchester, and some Class 142 Pacers in light blue British Rail Provincial livery had the "NW" emblem applied alongside the British Rail double arrow logo.

== See also ==
- Overground Network – a pilot brand used for London rail 2003–2006
