= British Rail Class 309 =

Electric multiple unit

British Railways AM9 British Rail Class 309 Clacton Express
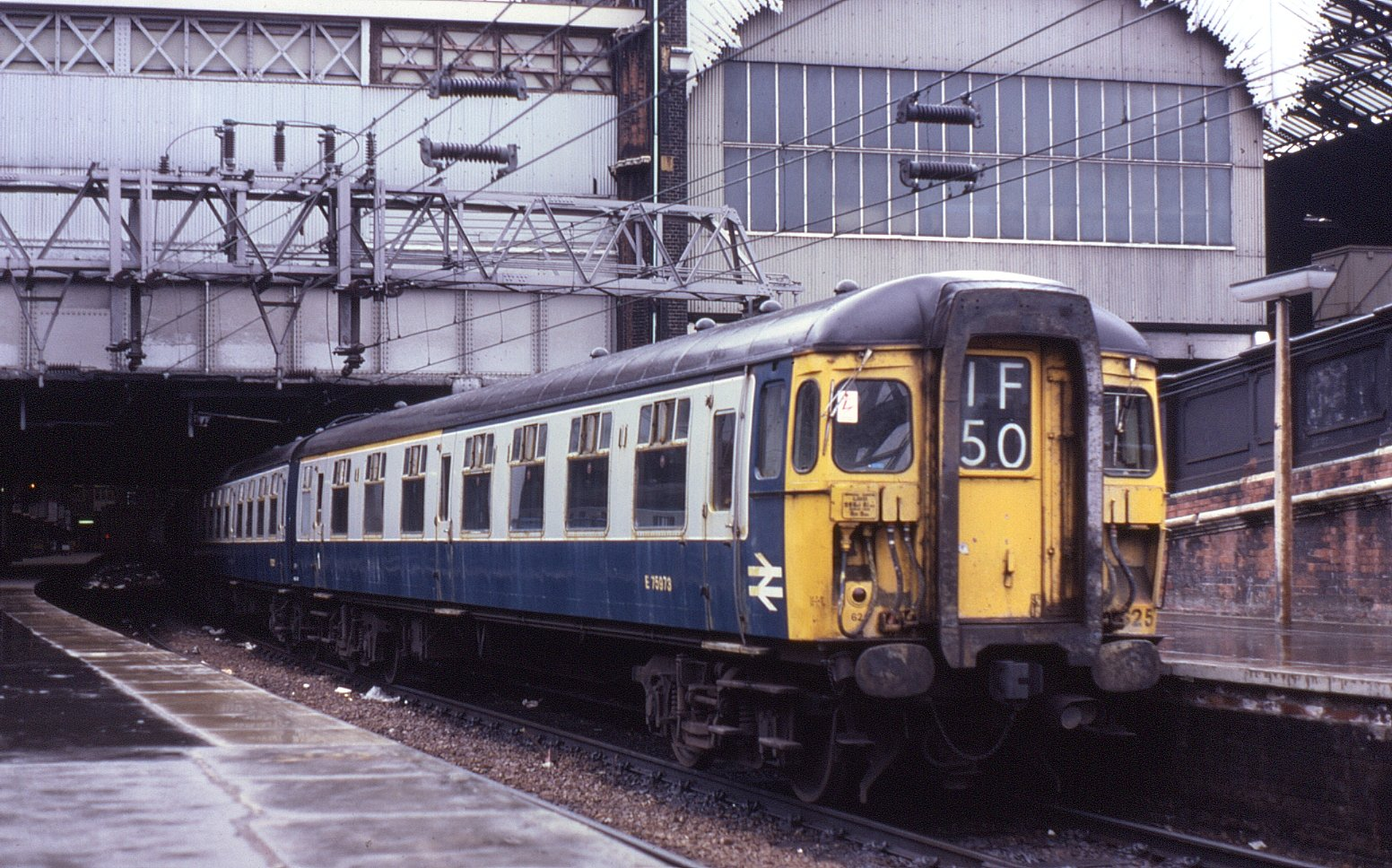
- Class 309 at London Liverpool Street in 1981
- In service: 1963–2000
- Manufacturer: British Rail
- Order nos.: 30675 (75962-75968); 30676 (61925-61931); 30677 (70253-70259); 30678 (75969-75975); 30679 (75637-75644); 30680 (61932-61939); 30681 (69100-69107); 30682 (75976-75983); 30683 (75984-75991); 30684 (61940-61947); c30707 (69108); 30871 (71107-71110); 30872 (71111-71114); 30893 (71277-71280); 30954 (71569-71576); 31001 (71754-71761)
- Built at: Holgate Road, York; Wolverton Works
- Family name: 1962 Express
- Replaced: BR Standard Class 7
- Constructed: 1962–1963
- Entered service: 1963
- Refurbished: 1985–1987
- Scrapped: 1992–1994; 2001–2004
- Number built: 24
- Number preserved: 2 (plus 1 additional vehicle)
- Number scrapped: 22
- Successor: Class 321; Class 323
- Formation: 2, 3 or 4 cars per trainset: DMBSK+BDTS (309/1); BDTC+MBSK+TRB+DTC (309/2); BDTC+MBSK+TSO+DTC (309/3); DMBS+TS+TC+BDTS (309/1 - modified, 309/4); BDTC+MBS+TS+DTS (309/3, modified)
- Diagram: EB206, EB207, BR421 (61940-61947); ED209, ED218, BR418 (61925-61931, 61932-61939); BR426 (69100-69107); BR495 (69108); EE229, BR448 (75969-75975); EE229, BR447 (75976-75983); EF216, EF209, BR446 (75984-75991); EF301, EF305, BR448 (75637-75644, 75962-75968); EH206, EH229, BR471 (70253-70259); EH207, EH227, BR469 (71107-71110); EH209, BR476 (71277-71280); EH220, EH227 (71569-71572); EH228 (71754-71761); EH306, EH309, BR462 (71111-71114); EH309 (71573-71576)
- Fleet numbers: 309/1: 601-608, later 309601-309608 (sets); 61940-61947 (DMBSK); 75984-75991 (BDTS); 309/2: 611-618 (sets); 75637-75644 (BDTC); 61932-61939 (MBSK); 69100-69107 (TRB); 75976-75983 (DTC); 309/3: 621-627, later 309621-309627 (sets); 75962-75968 (BDTC); 61925-61931 (MBSK); 70253-70259 (TSO); 75969-75975 (DTC)
- Capacity: 108S (309/1); 36F/112S/32U (309/2); 36F/176S (309/3); 24F/196S (309/1, modified); 18F/194S (309/3, modified)
- Operators: Eastern Region of British Rail; First North Western; Network Southeast; Regional Railways
- Depots: Clacton; Ilford; Longsight Electric TMD
- Lines served: Crewe–Manchester line; Great Eastern Main Line; Sunshine Coast Line

Specifications
- Car body construction: Steel
- Train length: 132 ft 9 1/4 in (40.469 m) (2-car); 265 ft 8 1/2 in (80.988 m) (4-car)
- Car length: 64 ft 6 in (19.66 m) (over body)
- Width: 9 ft 3 in (2.819 m) (overall)
- Height: 12 ft 9.5 in (3.899 m) (overall)
- Doors: Slam
- Wheelbase: 46 ft 6 in (14.173 m) (bogie centres)
- Maximum speed: 100 mph (161 km/h)
- Weight: 309/1 Total: 99 long tons (101 t; 111 short tons); 309/2: Total: 168 long tons (171 t; 188 short tons); 309/3 Total: 167 long tons (170 t; 187 short tons)
- Traction system: Electric Multiple Unit
- Traction motors: 4 × GEC WT401 of 210 kW (280 hp)
- Power output: 1,128 hp (841 kW)
- Acceleration: 0.41 m/s^{2} (0.92 mph/s)
- HVAC: Electric
- Electric system: 25 kV AC OHLE
- Current collection: Pantograph
- UIC classification: Bo′Bo′+2′2′ (309/1); Bo′Bo′+2′2′+2′2′+2′2′ (309/1 modified); 2′2′+Bo′Bo′+2′2′+2′2′ (others)
- Bogies: Commonwealth
- Braking system: Air (EP/Auto)
- Coupling system: Buckeye (outer); Solid shank (inner)
- Multiple working: Classes 302–312
- Track gauge: 1,435 mm (4 ft 8 1/2 in) standard gauge

The British Rail Class 309 "Clacton Express" electric multiple units (EMUs) were built by British Rail (BR) York Carriage Works from 1962 to 1963. They were initially classified as Class AM9 before the introduction of TOPS. These units were the first express 25 kV alternating current (AC) units to be built by British Rail and were their first EMUs capable of 100 mph.

== Description and design ==
Twenty-four units were built in three different configurations:

- 601–608 – Two-car units (309/1)
- 611–618 – Four-car units containing a griddle car (309/2)
- 621–627 – Four-car units (309/3)

Each unit had identical electrical equipment. The original concept called for increasing the power-to-weight ratio when strengthening trains from eight to ten cars in peak periods using the 2-car units, in order to make the peak timetable more resilient.

Due to problems that had been encountered with the BR1 bogie design then current for Mk1 loco-hauled coaches, the Class 309s were built with Commonwealth bogies, heavier than the more modern design, but more robust. The exception to this is vehicle E69108 which was originally a BR Class 123 Buffet Vehicle No. W59831. This was converted to a 309 griddle car but retained its B4 bogies, becoming the only vehicle in the class with this type. This vehicle also had 36 seats in the Buffet area compared to 24 in the other units.

The front end design incorporates the drivers cab but retained passenger access between units via a pullman gangway, needed to allow access to the griddle car from all coaches. Notable was the curved wrap-around glass on the cab windows which proved expensive to replace. Later an additional pillar was inserted so that flat glass could be used. The units were originally class AM9 (AC Multiple Unit) pre-TOPS, and were painted in the BR standard coaching stock maroon livery lined black & yellow, with the driving end gangway doors painted warning panel yellow.

Units 605-608 were expanded to 4 coaches in 1973 by the addition of a Corridor Second (SK) and a Corridor Composite (CK) and reclassified 309/4. In 1981 units 601-608 were again altered, the formation was reduced to 3 coaches to become MBS-TC-DMS, set 605-608 were reclassified back to 309/1.

== Operations ==
The units were originally planned to be used on the original proposed East Coast Main Line Electrification Scheme, however, when this was abandoned the units were deployed on Great Eastern Main Line (GEML) express services from London Liverpool Street to Clacton-on-Sea and Walton-on-the-Naze (also marketed as the Sunshine Coast Line) thus gaining them the class nickname Clacton Express. Trains would be formed of three units in a ten-car formation (i.e. one two car unit, and two four car units). The train divided at Thorpe-le-Soken, with one of the 4-cars units used on the Walton section, and the remaining six cars continuing to Clacton. The Clacton portion usually included the griddle car unit, and was always the second to leave Thorpe-le-Soken, being the rear (London end) portion of the coastbound train. The choice of building units with only two coaches may seem unusual, but these were intended only for use in strengthening pairs of four coach units at peak times to produce a ten coach train, and with this in mind they only had second class accommodation.

The Class 309 units were considerably more powerful than the Britannia pacifics that they replaced with a typical 10-coach formation (2 x 4-car units plus 1 x 2-car unit) producing 3,384 hp for 428 long tons (435 t) tare. However, from 1971 it was found that additional seating capacity was required for the evening peak and the 17.40 departure from Liverpool Street station was increased to 12 coaches by the addition of a second 2-car unit bringing the power output up to 4,512 hp from a train of 521 long tons (529 t) tare.

In 1973-74 the two-car units 605–608 were expanded to four-car units with the addition of TSK with TCK converted former Mk1 SK and CK coaches. In 1978 the two car units 601–604 were expanded with the addition of TCK and TSOL converted former Mk1 CK and TSO coaches which formed 4 car sets. In the early 1980s units 611-618 had the griddle cars taken out of use and replaced by TSOL from 601 to 604 and TSK from 605 to 608. 601-608 were thus reduced to 3-car units until refurbishment work in 1985–86. In 1986-87 8 Mk1 TSO coaches were converted to TSO trailers for units 611–618 with the borrowed TSOL and TSK trailers all being converted to TSOL trailers and reformed back into 601–608.

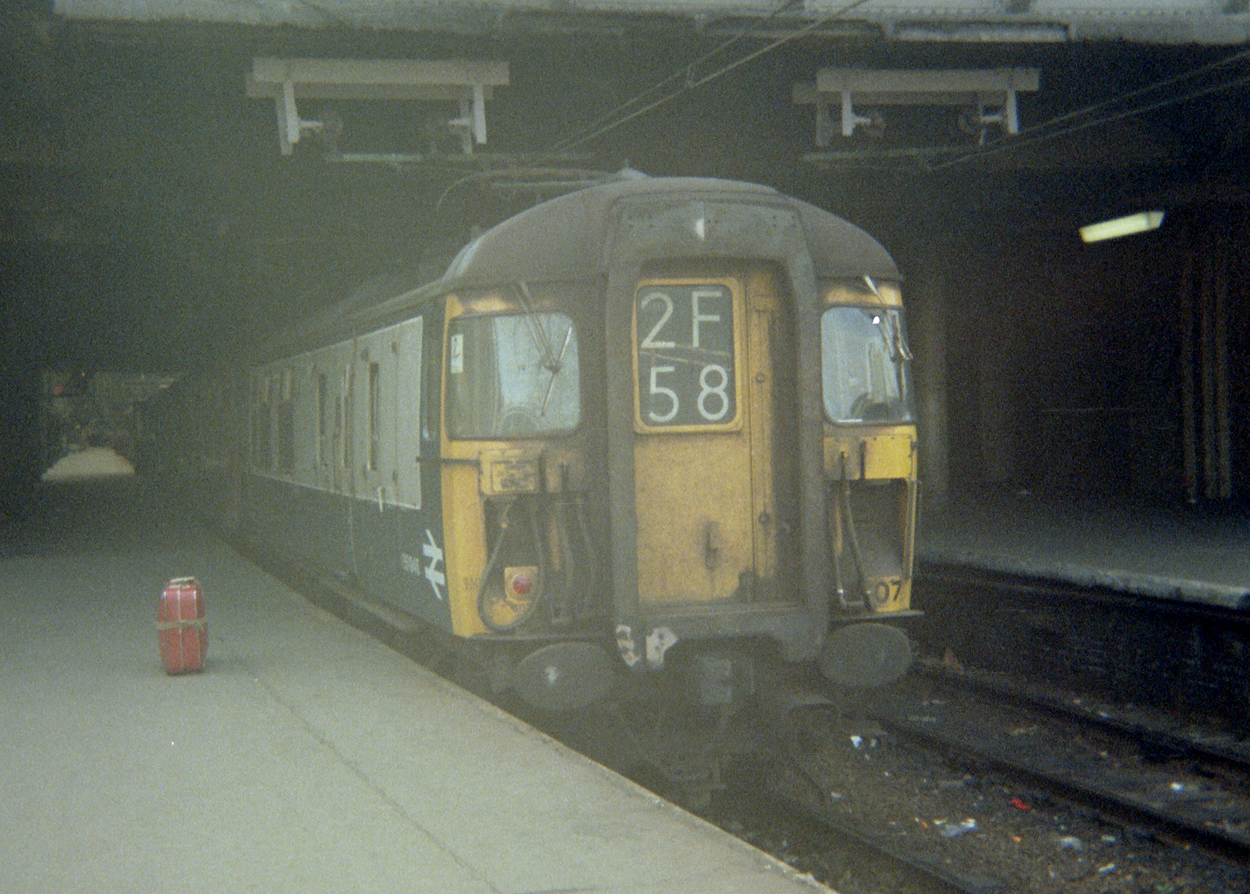
The front of a Class 309 train in blue/grey BR livery with original 'wrap around' cab windows at London Liverpool Street station

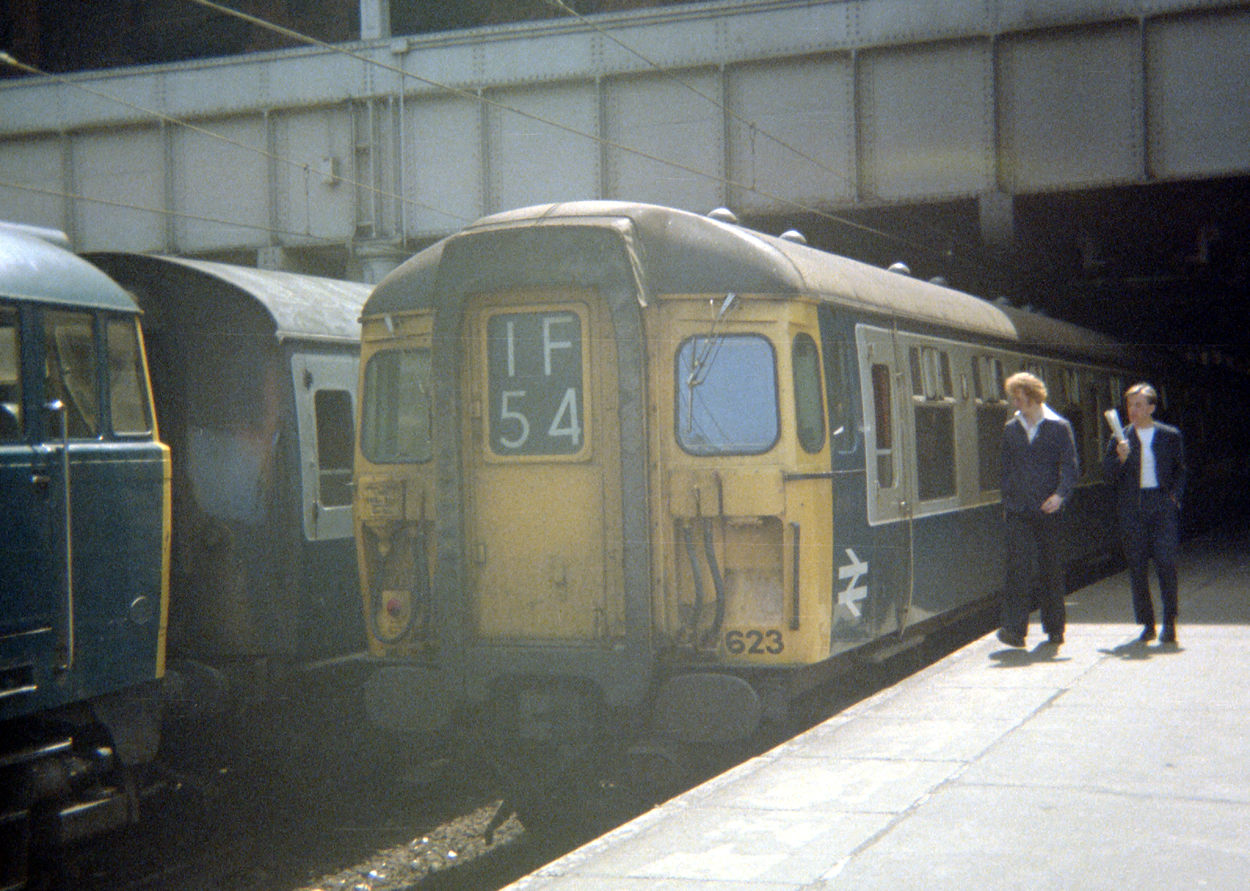
The front of a Class 309 train in blue/grey BR livery with modified front windows at London Liverpool Street station

The entire fleet was refurbished in the period 1985–1987, with the single-glazed wooden framed windows replaced by aluminium-framed double-glazed units with hopper ventilators. Another change was 2 + 2 seating in open saloons replacing the second class compartments, this change producing an increase in seating capacity.

The first refurbished units outshopped were painted in the new London and SouthEastern "Jaffa Cake" livery. However, this was soon superseded by the Network SouthEast livery, which was introduced in 1986. Coinciding with the refurbishment work, in 1985 electrification spread north from Colchester to Ipswich, and later to Harwich and Norwich. This meant the Class 309 units domain expanded to Ipswich and Harwich.

In 1989, new Class 321/3 units were introduced onto GEML services partially replacing both class 309 and Class 312 diagrams. The "Clacton Express" units however continued until May 1992 in main service and then a reduced fleet operated a few rush hour services until January 1994. The last units were withdrawn on 22 January 1994 after working a final railtour on 15 January 1994. The final Saturday diagram was run with 309626/613/616 ending on the 1800 Liverpool Street - Clacton-on-Sea. 15 units were scrapped with seven retained for reuse around Manchester on suburban trains, the units were stored at Blackpool.

In 1994, North West Regional Railways (NWRR) acquired the seven units . The units, nos. 309613/616/617/624/626/627, were quickly put to use operating suburban passenger services from Manchester Piccadilly to Crewe and Stoke-on-Trent. Six of the seven units were repainted in the Regional Railways blue livery with the addition of a green stripe. The seventh, no. 309624, was repainted in a special blue livery to commemorate the opening a new railway line to Manchester International Airport in 1996. Upon privatisation, the units passed to the North Western Trains (NWT) franchise. This was later renamed First North Western (FNW) following FirstGroup taking 100% ownership of Great Western Holdings.

By the late 1990s, the seven units saw continued use around Manchester. They also saw some use on longer distance services, with one booked daily Manchester Piccadilly-Birmingham International service and return. On occasion, units were used on NWT's Manchester-London Euston service, deputising for a non-available Class 322 unit. At one point, it was planned to use the units on a new Crewe-Carlisle stopping service, but this did not happen. Part of FNW's franchise commitment was to replace their slam-door rolling stock, including the Class 309 units so new Class 175 diesel multiple units were introduced in 2000, and FNW discontinued its Manchester-Euston service. The remaining class 309 units were then surplus to requirements. As a farewell gesture, three units were used on a final railtour from Manchester to their old haunt of Clacton-on-Sea via Liverpool Street station. All seven units were then withdrawn in late 2000 and sent for storage at MoD Pig's Bay near Shoeburyness. Four of the seven units were scrapped in 2004.

== Further use ==
Following withdrawal from normal service, three units were transferred to Eastleigh works: numbers 616, 617 and 624. In 2001, two of these units were converted to Class 960 departmental units for cab-signalling tests at the Old Dalby test track. They were reduced to 3 cars and painted in a blue and white livery. The units' designations were 960101 (ex-309616), named West Coast Flyer, and 960102 (ex-309624), named New Dalby. They were withdrawn in 2004, following completion of the tests and were stored at MoD Pig's Bay, near Shoeburyness, Essex, until early 2009 when they entered preservation. The third unit, 617, was used as a spares donor and sat derelict at Eastleigh until it was scrapped in August 2004.

The TSO from 309623 was purchased by West Coast Railways in 2003 for spares use remaining unrestored at Carnforth MPD, in its Regional Railways livery.

== Preservation ==
Several unsuccessful attempts, since their original withdrawal in 1994, have been made to preserve a Class 309. Once no further work was found for the last 2 units in departmental use units 309616 and 309624 were preserved by AMPSRail Limited in 2009, and went to the Electric Railway Museum, Warwickshire. When this was forced to close in 2018 the sale of 624 was used to fund transport costs for 616, and the two sets went to different locations.

Unit 616, still in the care of AMPSRail, went to Tanat Valley Light Railway in Oswestry. It has remained as a static exhibit with the interior now used as a Cafe and tea room, titled "The Clacton Cafe"

Unit 624 was sold to the Lavender Line and arrived in 2018. Minor conservation work was carried out, but due to changing priorities at the railway, the set was put up for sale in 2021. In March 2022, the unit was purchased by the CEPG, funded by a private benefactor with it remaining at the Lavender line. In May 2024 BDTC 75965 and MBS 61928 were donated to the East Anglian Railway Museum for full restoration of both vehicles. Due to a lack of space at the EARM DTS 75972 has been donated to the Rushden, Higham and Wellingborough Railway who intend to restore it to operational condition.
