= N0 =

N0 ("N" followed by number zero) may refer to:

- Neutron (n^{0}), a subatomic particle
- $\mathbb{N}_0$, the natural numbers including zero
- Norse Atlantic Airways (IATA code: N0), a Norwegian airline

== See also ==
- 0N (disambiguation)
