= London Rail =

Directorate of Transport for London

- Formation: 2003
- Type: Directorate of Transport for London
- Purpose: Overseeing regional rail operations
- Region served: Greater London, UK
- Parent organisation: Transport for London

A topological map of the London Rail services, showing all lines and stations. The London Overground, DLR, Tramlink, and Elizabeth line are shown, as well as the London Underground system, to show how London Rail's services integrate with each other.

London Rail was a directorate of Transport for London (TfL), involved in the relationship with the National Rail network within Greater London, UK which managed TfL's non-London Underground train services.

Rail for London, established in 2006, provides rail passenger transport services in London.

== Operations ==
London Rail managed the London Overground (LO), London Trams, the Docklands Light Railway (DLR), and the Elizabeth line. As part of an internal restructure within TfL, it recently merged with the (previously separate) London Underground directorate, bringing all of Greater London local transport services on rails under one division.

The London Overground was established in 2007 when TfL took over the control of the former National Rail Silverlink franchise in 2007. It has since taken on more services through a former London Underground line and over other Network Rail lines. London Rail lets a concession to operate the Overground. Operation is contracted to Arriva Rail London (owned by Arriva UK Trains) until 2024.

London Trams is responsible only for the Croydon Tram known as Tramlink. Tramlink was set up in 2000 by a private finance initiative. It was bought by TfL in 2008 and is operated on its behalf by FirstGroup. London Trams has been working on proposals for other tram schemes in west and central London, however as of 2011 all are unfunded or cancelled.

The Docklands Light Railway was established in 1987 and has seen significant expansion since. Its operation has been contracted out as a concession to KeolisAmey since 2014. There are also other concessionaires who have built and managed extensions.

The Elizabeth Line (constructed by the Crossrail project) also operates as a concession from London Rail. It already operates the Shenfield Metro services, taking over from Abellio Greater Anglia on 31 May 2015, as well as the ex-Heathrow Connect route since 20 May 2018.

== National Rail in Greater London ==
The National Rail network within Greater London carries large numbers of commuters into London and also provides many local services, especially within South London.

Under the Greater London Authority Act 1999 Transport for London was given powers to consult with the train operators and as such London Rail is therefore more of an enabler than an operator, and has developed partnerships with the Department for Transport (who are responsible for rail strategy), Network Rail (who own the infrastructure) and the various train operating companies (who operate the services) in order to further its aims.

A pilot project was launched in 2003 to promote the various services provided by train operating companies in South London under one umbrella brand, Overground Network. The scheme included station upgrades, signage and publicity, but promotion of the brand had ceased by 2007.

London Rail also influences rail freight and freight depots in Greater London. In August 2007, London Rail published its 'Rail Freight Strategy' report.

Both former Mayors of London Ken Livingstone and Boris Johnson have expressed the desire to gain control of all local rail services in Greater London in the future and make them part of the London Overground. London Overground has already taken over Lea Valley Lines services from Liverpool Street to Enfield Town, Cheshunt and Chingford and Romford to Upminster Line services on 31 May 2015.
