= Overground Network =

Defunct rail brand in London

Overview
- Owner: Strategic Rail Authority; Transport for London
- Locale: Greater London
- Transit type: Pilot umbrella brand for multiple commuter rail services

Operation
- Began operation: 2003
- Ended operation: 2006 (approximate)
- Operators: Connex South Eastern; South Central Trains; South West Trains

Overground Network (abbreviated on or ON) was a branding initiative launched in 2003 by the Strategic Rail Authority (SRA) and Transport for London (TfL), the public transport authority in Greater London, England. Its aim was to encourage use of National Rail services in South London. The project was a partnership between the SRA, TfL, three train operating companies (Connex South Eastern, South Central Trains and South West Trains), the South and West London Transport Conference (SWELTRAC) and the South East London Transport Strategy (SELTRANS). The scheme is no longer being promoted and the Overground Network project has since been abandoned.

Note that in common parlance within London, the term "overground" may be used in reference to any National Rail line, in order to distinguish it from the Underground.

== Background ==
Suburban rail services in London, as in the rest of Great Britain, are run on a system of rail franchises and operated by a number of private train operating companies, managed by National Rail.

South London is poorly served by the London Underground network, but does have a large number of suburban rail lines. Transport studies had suggested that the public perceived the South London rail network as confusing, with multiple operators and a lack of consistent information design, in contrast to the clarity of London Underground's Tube map.

A pilot scheme was launched on 30 September 2003 to bring National Rail services operated by multiple companies at 41 stations under one branding umbrella within London.

== Control of rail services ==
Unlike the today's London Overground, TfL exercised no operational or regulatory control over rail services on the Overground Network, but funded station improvements such as standardised information presentation, branded signage, CCTV and lighting. Operational powers remained with the individual train operators.

In 2004 TfL put forward proposals for a "London Regional Rail Authority" to be established, which would give TfL regulatory powers over rail services in and around Greater London. The Department for Transport considered that granting operational control of rail services to the London mayor would result in fragmentation of the National Rail system. Out of these proposals evolved a new mechanism for giving the London mayor more control over rail services within London, and London Overground was established as a National Rail franchise managed by TfL in 2007. This new system, mostly in North London, was the successor to the Overground Network pilot. ON was quietly forgotten and TfL now promotes LO as its rail service.

== Ticketing ==
The Overground Network pilot was a branding exercise and did not include any new ticketing policies. When London Overground was launched, it was fully integrated into TfL's ticketing network from its launch, including full acceptance of the Oyster card electronic smartcard system. This ticketing policy was not extended to the former Overground Network, and for a number of years Oyster card pay-as-you-go tickets were not valid at stations bearing the "ON" brand, despite the similarity of the two network brand names. In January 2010, Oyster card was fully rolled out across National Rail services in London, and Oyster pay-as-you-go is now valid across the whole London rail network, including the former "ON" system.

== The ON brand ==
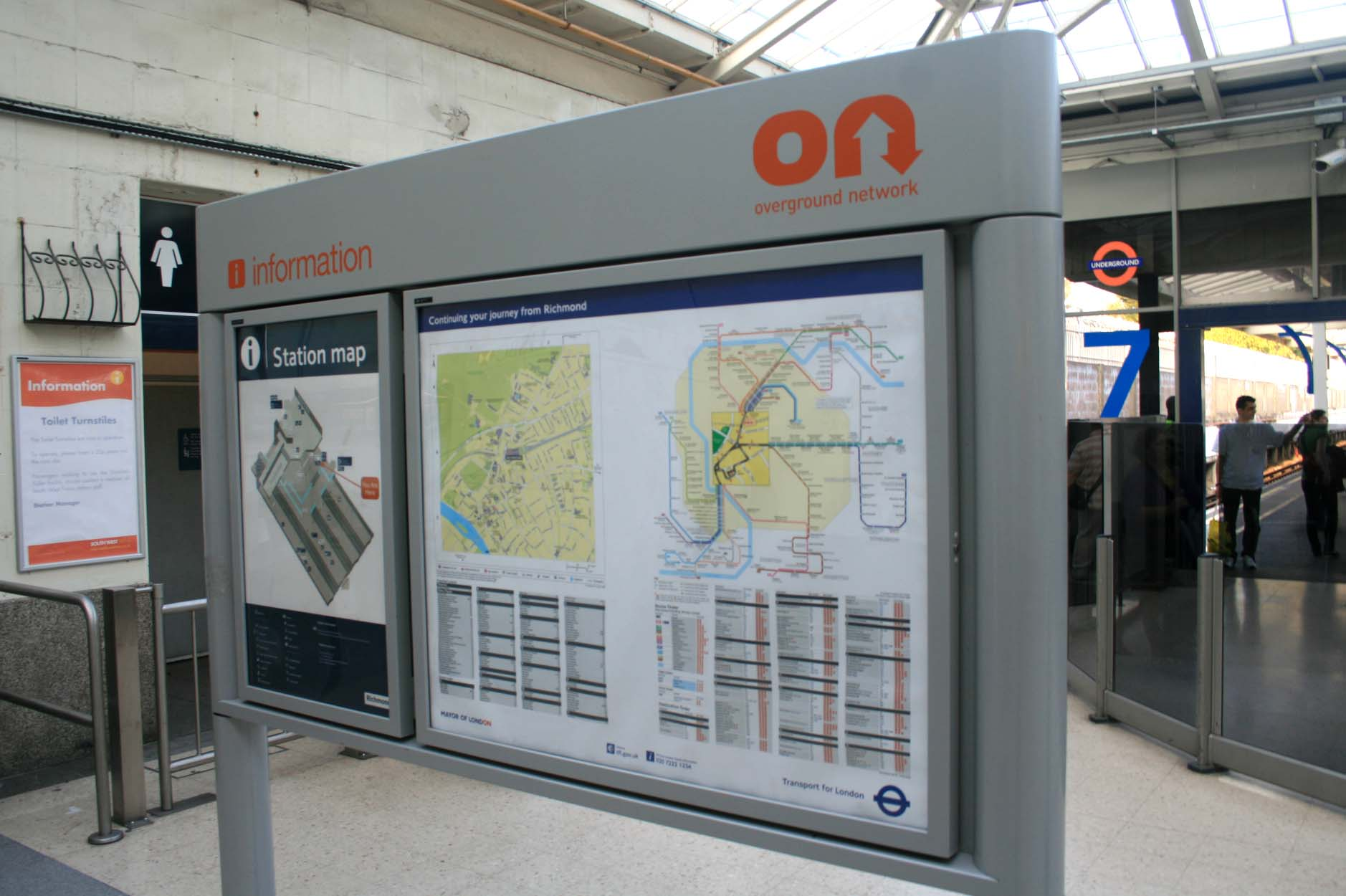
ON-branded signs

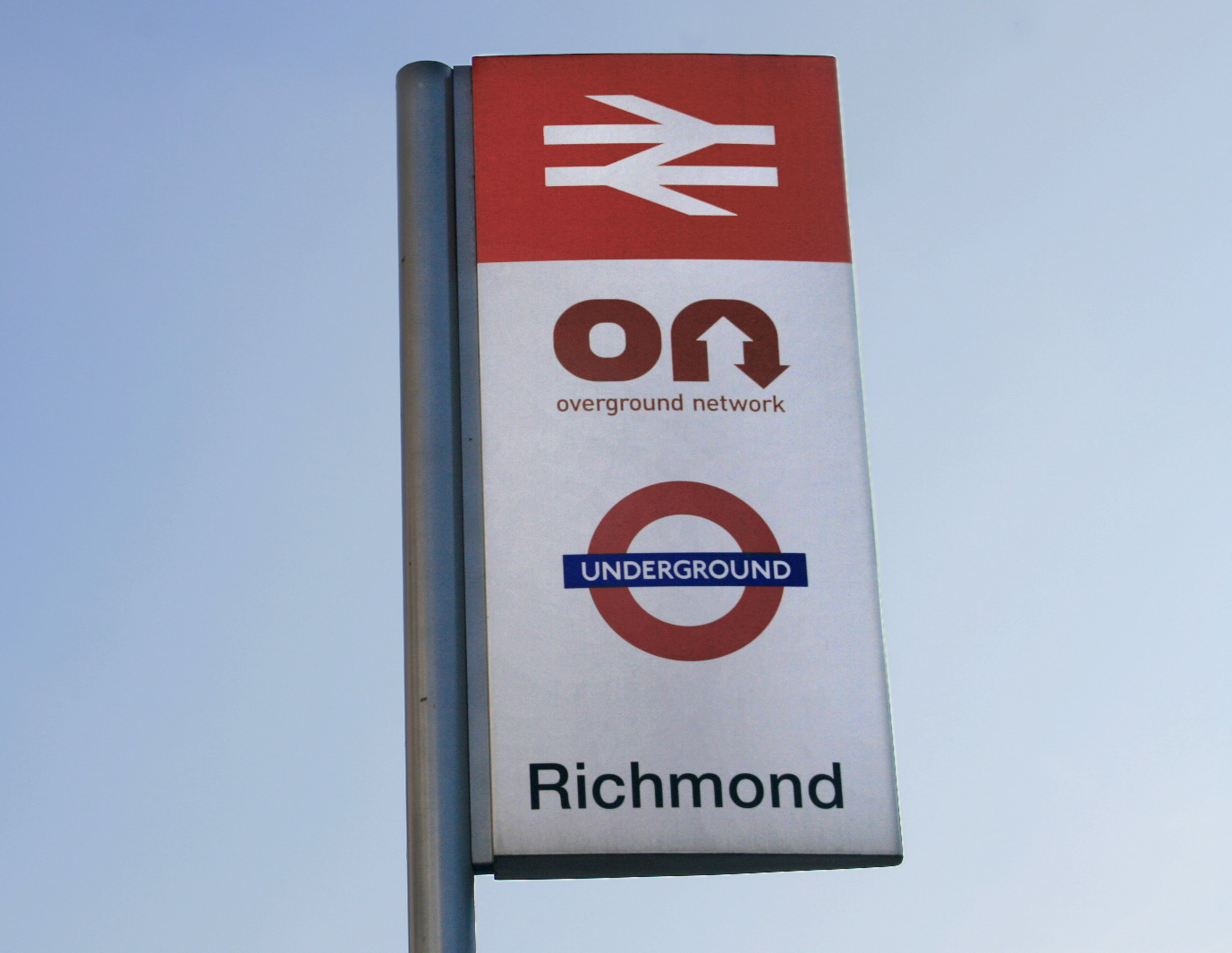
Sign at Richmond

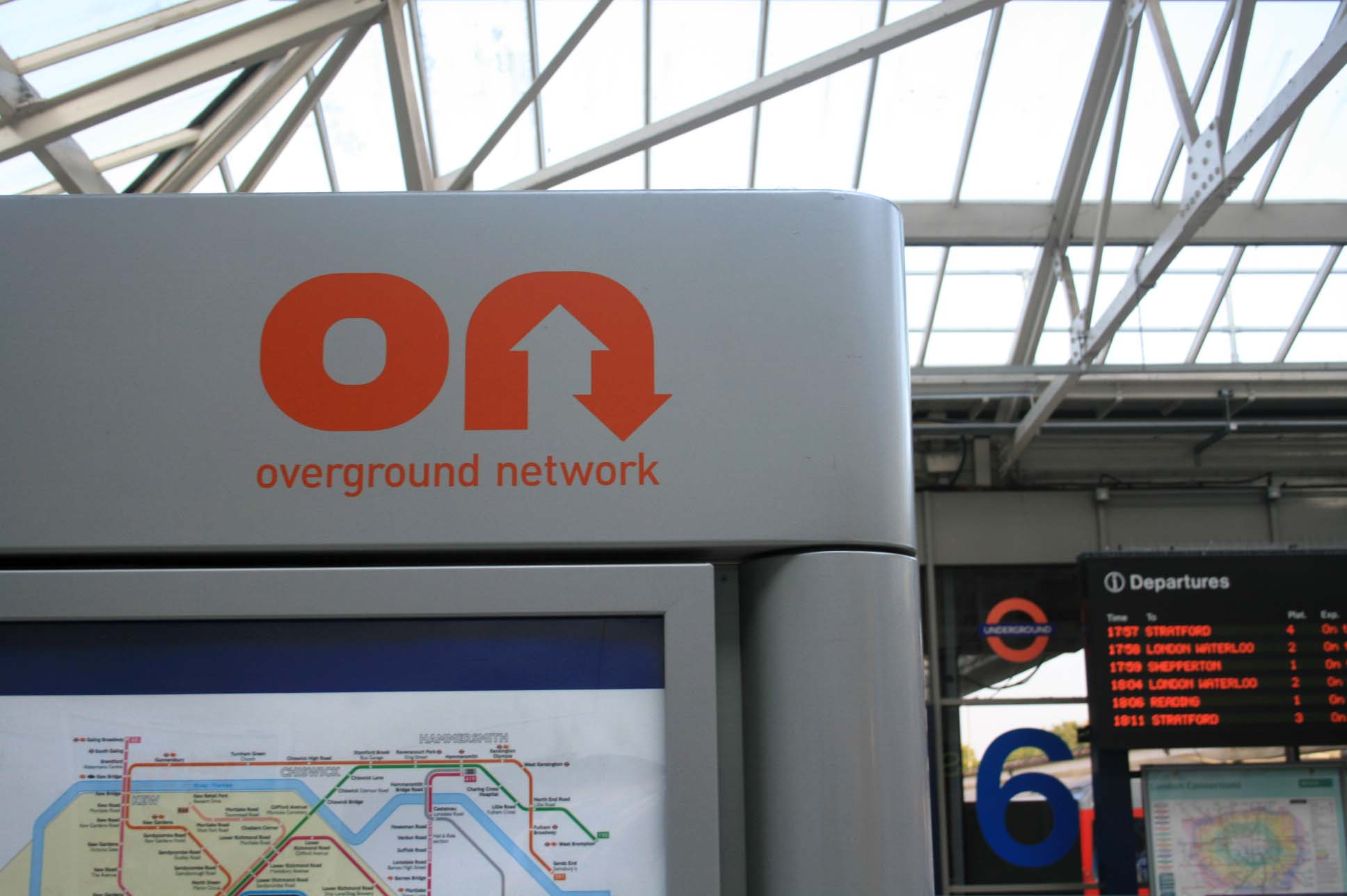
Overground Network branding

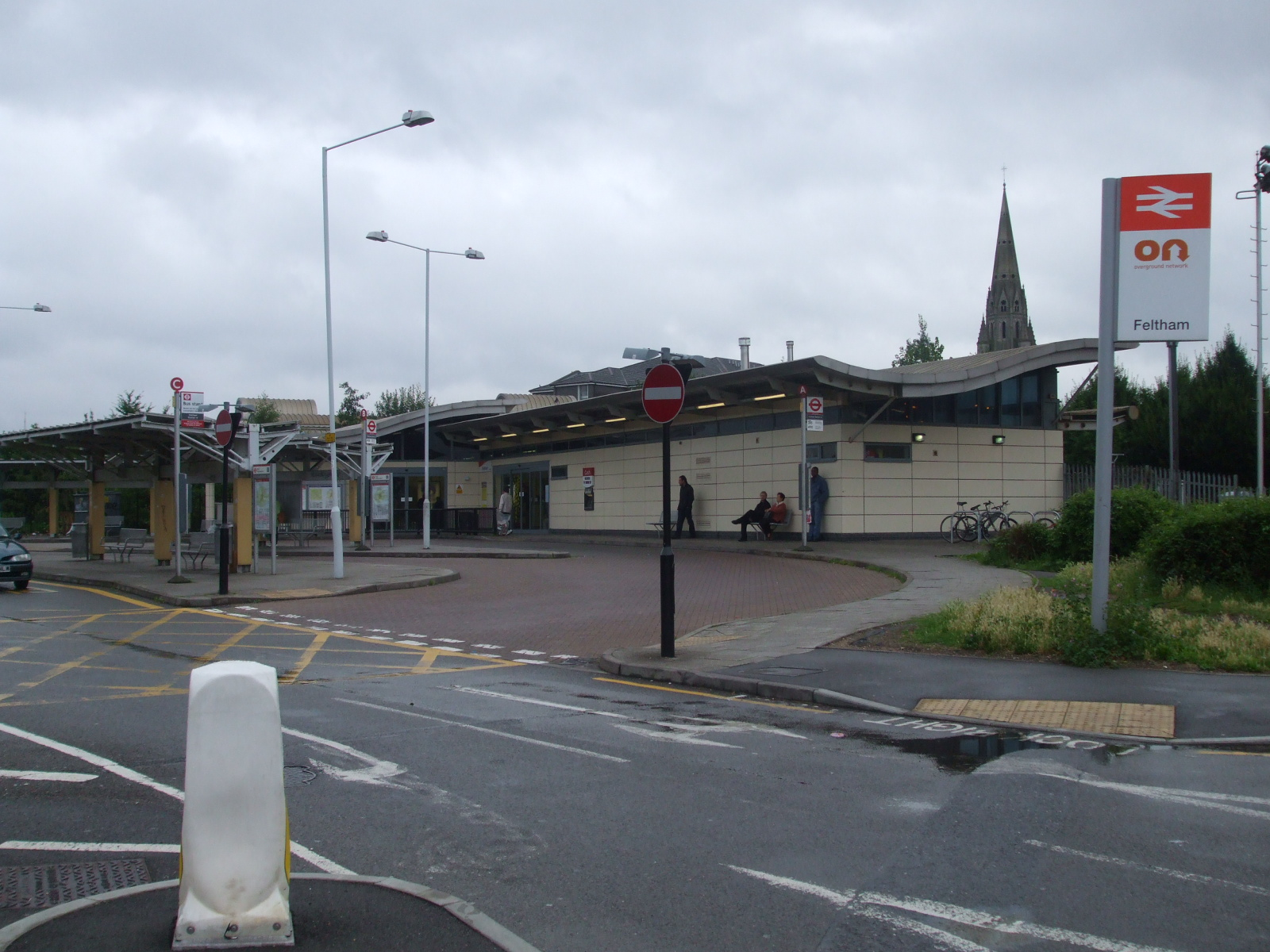
Feltham railway station, with "ON" signage outside (far right)

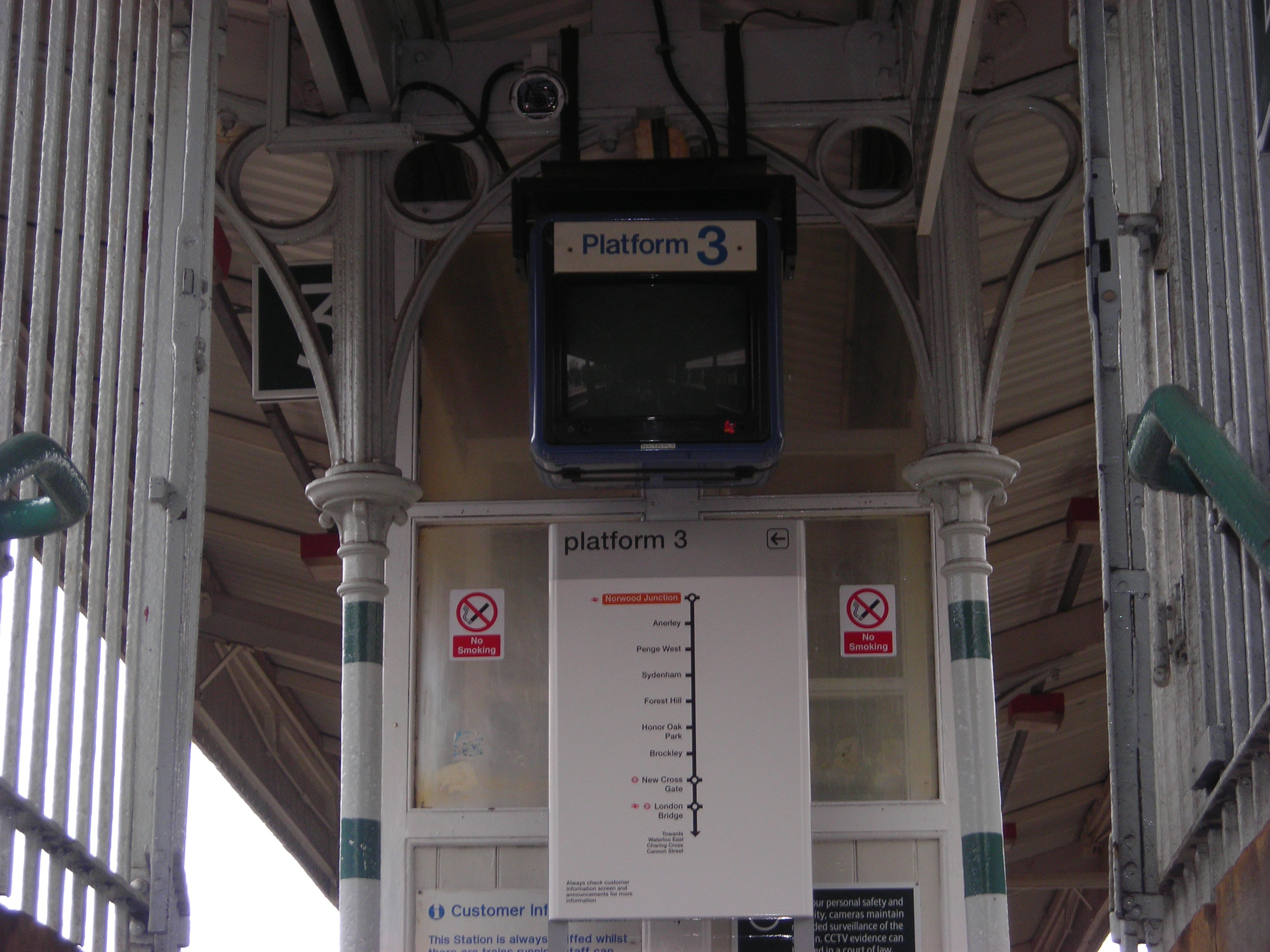
ON line map at Norwood Junction station

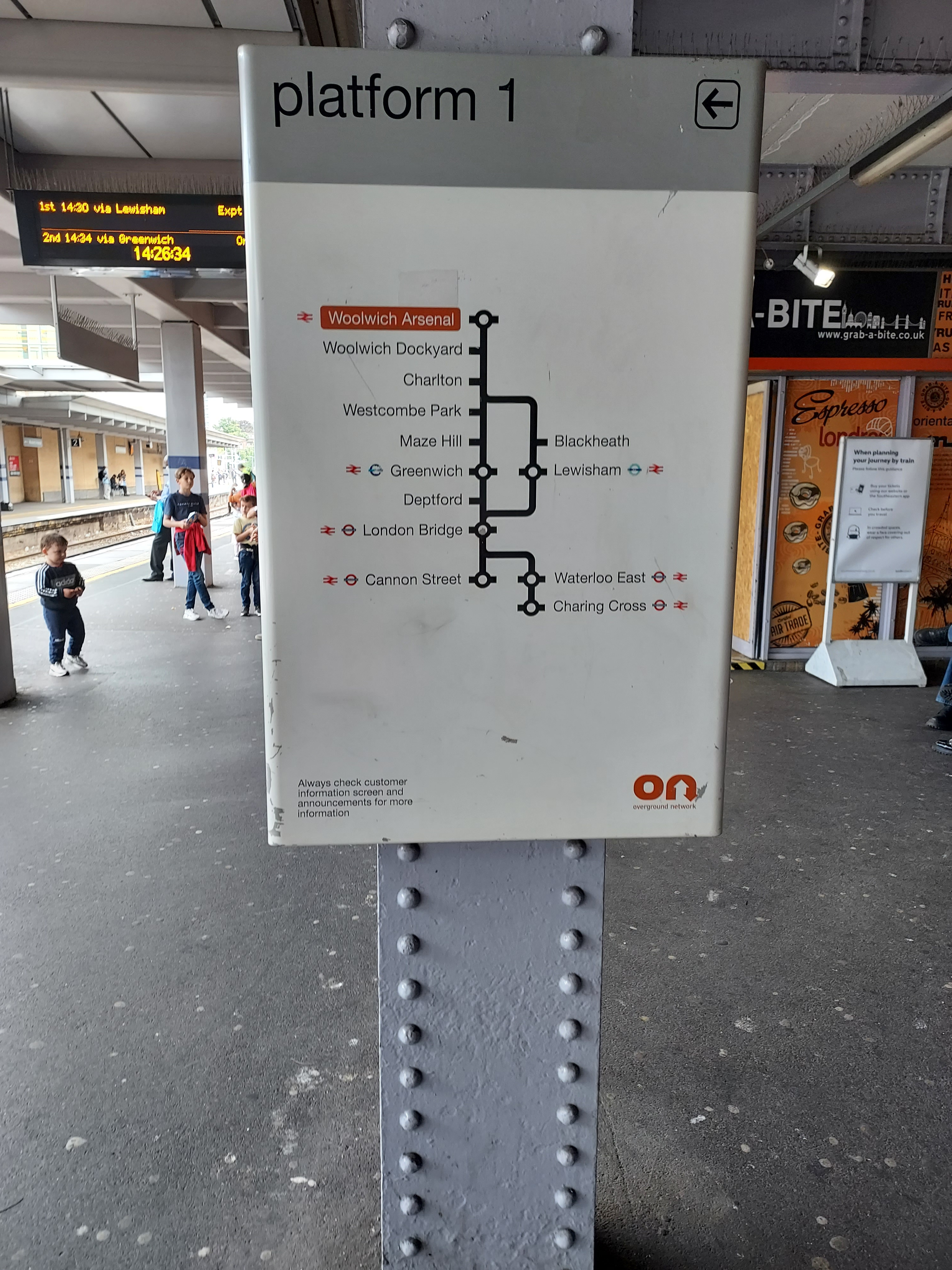
ON line map at Woolwich Arsenal station in August 2021

Using the Overground Network brand, Transport for London introduced consistent information displays, station signage and maps on selected routes in South London, along with prominent "ON" branding on station exteriors. Railway stations selected for the Overground Network were those with a service frequency of 4 or more trains per hour to a London terminus. The scheme sought to encourage metro-style usage of these services. A diagrammatic map of the Overground Network was published to support passenger information provision, showing high-frequency routes in colour, with Underground and Tramlink connections. The ON branding was not applied to trains, which retained the livery of the individual train operating companies.

The "ON" brand was conceived by the brand agency Fitch and featured a logo formed from orange-coloured, lower-case "ON" initials. The letter "N" was stylised to look like a rounded arrow pointing down, with an arrow cutout shape penetrating upwards.

Although this pilot was purely an exercise in branding, this was the first instance of TfL having a visible influence over National Rail services in London. The Overground Network pilot has since been withdrawn.

As of September 2006, the scheme had not been expanded. However, TfL has helped fund several similar station upgrade programmes including enhanced passenger information and line guides without applying the "on" branding, leaving the future of the scheme in doubt. The Overground Network website was shut down in February 2007, and now redirects to the TfL pages for London Rail.

== End of the brand ==
According to a talk given by Innes Ferguson of TfL at the London Transport Museum on 24 September 2007, the Overground Network scheme is now "dead"; the logo is no longer being used on train operating companies' (TOCs) publicity material nor is the network being promoted by TfL. He added that whilst TfL funded the installation of Overground Network "on" signage at appropriate National Rail stations, it is being left to individual TOCs to remove these at their own expense, hence the many that remain in situ in 2008, and even some are still left as of 2021.

In 2006, TfL launched London Overground, a similar but more comprehensive scheme in north London unrelated to Overground Network. Again, according to Innes Ferguson, TfL's medium-term aspiration is for the former to be expanded to cover other National Rail services in London and the South-East, either by direct TfL operation through a concession-holder (as with the ex-Silverlink routes) or by a TOC agreeing to operate under the London Overground "brand".

== Routes ==
These routes were part of the scheme, and carried the on branding on station signs:

- Kingston Loop Line
  - Waterloo to Teddington via Wimbledon (South West Trains)
- Waterloo to Reading Line
  - Waterloo to Twickenham via Richmond (South West Trains)
- Sutton & Mole Valley Lines
  - Victoria to East and West Croydon via Norbury (Southern)
- Greenwich Line/North Kent Line
  - London Bridge to Dartford via Greenwich (Connex South Eastern)

Additionally, these routes were shown on the network map as having four trains per hour service:

- Waterloo to Epsom, Surbiton, Staines and Hounslow.
- Victoria to Epsom, Peckham Rye and Bromley South
- London Bridge to Crystal Palace and Smitham.
- Blackfriars to Streatham and East Croydon.
- Charing Cross and Cannon Street to Crayford, Blackheath and Hayes

== See also ==
- London Overground
- Network NorthWest - a short-lived brand used for rail services in North West England in 1989
