= Brondyffryn Trust =

Welsh charitable organisation

The Brondyffryn Trust was a charity for autistic children based in Wales.

The trust was formed in 2002 by parents and governors at Ysgol Plas Brondyffryn, a school for autistic children in Denbigh, Wales, to raise money for residential facilities and a support centre for parents with autistic children. It sought to raise £1.3 million for the residential facilities and £2.2 million to build a 16 plus college and parent centre. By May 2003, the Trust had raised £500,000, enabling work to begin on the residential phase of the project, with construction expected to begin in 2004. Following the failure to create a partnership agreement with the local governing body Denbighshire County Council, by which the Trust would have financed the building of the residential centre and the furnishings while the Denbighshire County Council would help run the centre, the Trust was dissolved in March 2004.
