= O(n) =

In mathematics, O(n) may refer to:

- O(n), the orthogonal group
- Big O notation, indicating the order of growth of some quantity as a function of "n" or the limiting behavior of a function, e.g. in computational complexity theory
- The nth tensor power of Serre's twisting sheaf $\mathcal{O}(1)$
