= First North Western =

British train operating company

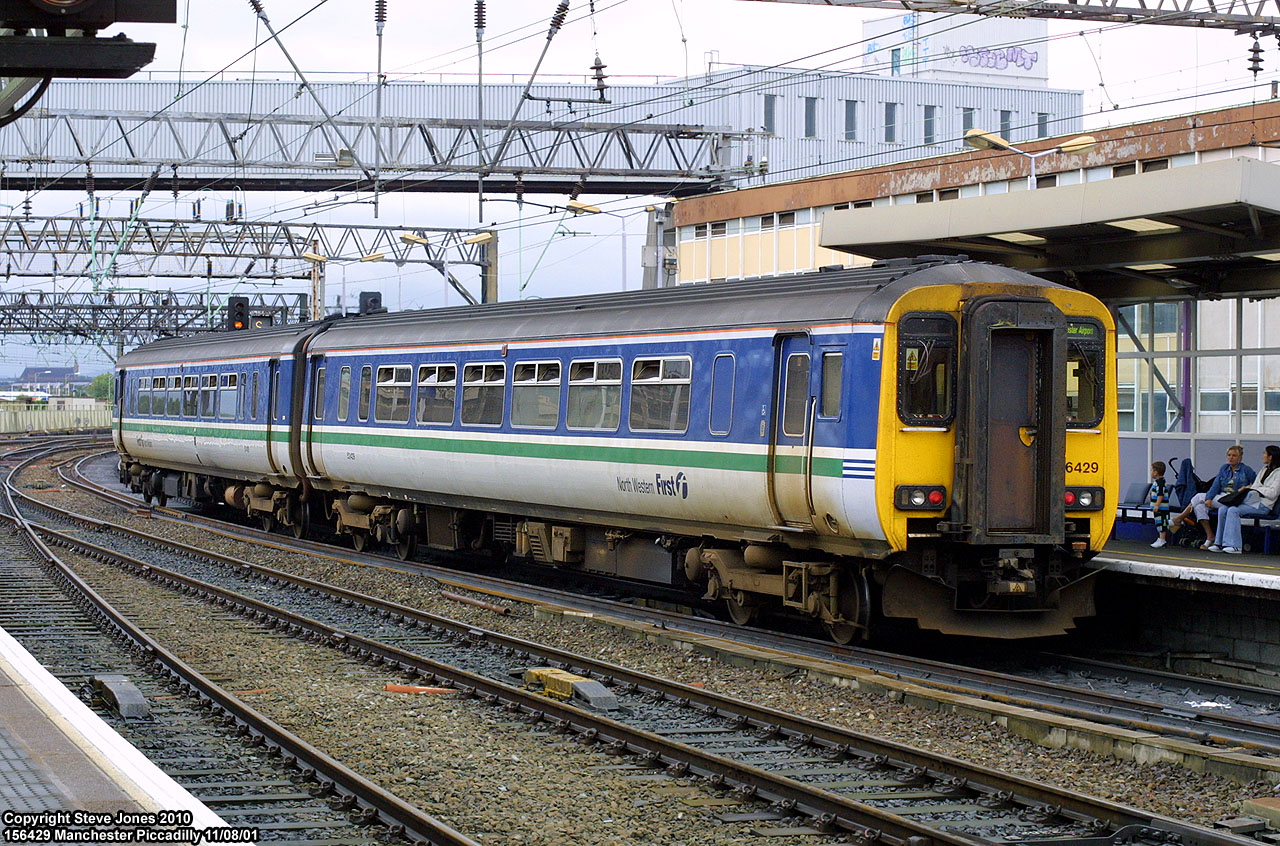
- Class 156 at Manchester Piccadilly in 2001

Overview
- Franchises: North West Regional Railways; 2 March 1997 – 11 December 2004
- Main regions: North West England; North Wales
- Other regions: London; Birmingham; Yorkshire
- Fleet: 184
- Stations called at: 247
- Parent company: FirstGroup
- Reporting mark: NW
- Predecessor: Regional Railways
- Successors: First TransPennine Express; Northern Rail

First North Western was a British train operating company owned by FirstGroup that operated the North West Regional Railways franchise from March 1997 until December 2004.

== History ==
In the lead up to the privatisation of British Rail, the North Western section of Regional Railways was established. For a brief period from 1989, this section was operated under the short-lived Network NorthWest brand name, before becoming North West Regional Railways. The franchise was awarded by the Director of Passenger Rail Franchising to Great Western Holdings, with operations commencing on 2 March 1997 under the North Western Trains brand.

On 27 October 1997, a new livery of dark blue with a gold star was unveiled. In March 1998, FirstGroup bought out the other shareholders in Great Western Holdings. The business was rebranded from North Western Trains to First North Western in November 1998 with First's corporate blue, pink and white livery adopted.

== Services ==
First North Western operated a mix of urban and rural passenger services in North West England and North Wales, radiating out from Manchester to Birmingham, Chester, Holyhead, Liverpool, Blackpool North, Windermere and Sheffield.

In May 1998, North Western Trains commenced services from Manchester Airport and Rochdale to London Euston. The Manchester Airport service ceased in May 1999 and the Rochdale service in May 2000.

From May 2003, services from Manchester ceased operating south of Stoke-on-Trent and Crewe.

== Rolling stock ==
First North Western inherited a fleet of Mark 2 carriages, Class 101, 142, 150, 153, 156 and 158 diesel multiple units, and Class 309 and 323 electric multiple units. The Mark 2 carriages were generally hauled by EWS Class 37 locomotives and were used on North Wales services.

To operate the Manchester Airport to London Euston services, two Class 322s were hired from West Anglia Great Northern.

First North Western ordered 11 two-carriage and 16 three-carriage Class 175 Coradia 1000s to replace the Mark 2 carriages, Class 101s and Class 309s. Originally some were to be Class 180 Adelantes, capable of running at 125 mph (201 km/h), but this was later changed to an all-Class 175 fleet.

Problems with the Class 175s saw locomotive-hauled trains reinstated on North Wales services from June 2002, with EWS Class 47s and First Great Western Mark 2 carriages.

In February 2004, Class 31 locomotives were hired from Fragonset to top and tail Mark 2 carriages on Blackpool to Chester services.

Class	Image	Type	Top speed		Number	Built
Class	Image	Type	mph	km/h	Number	Built
101		DMU	75	120	6	1956–1959
142 Pacer		DMU	75	120	79	1985–1987
150 Sprinter		DMU	75	120	27	1984–1987
153 Super Sprinter		DMU	75	120	8	1987–1988
156 Super Sprinter		DMU	75	120	18	1987–1989
158 Express Sprinter		DMU	90	145	8	1989–1992
175 Coradia 1000		DMU	100	160	27	1999–2001
309		EMU	100	160	9	1962–1963
322		EMU	100	160	4	1990
323		EMU	90	145	17	1992–1995

== Depots ==
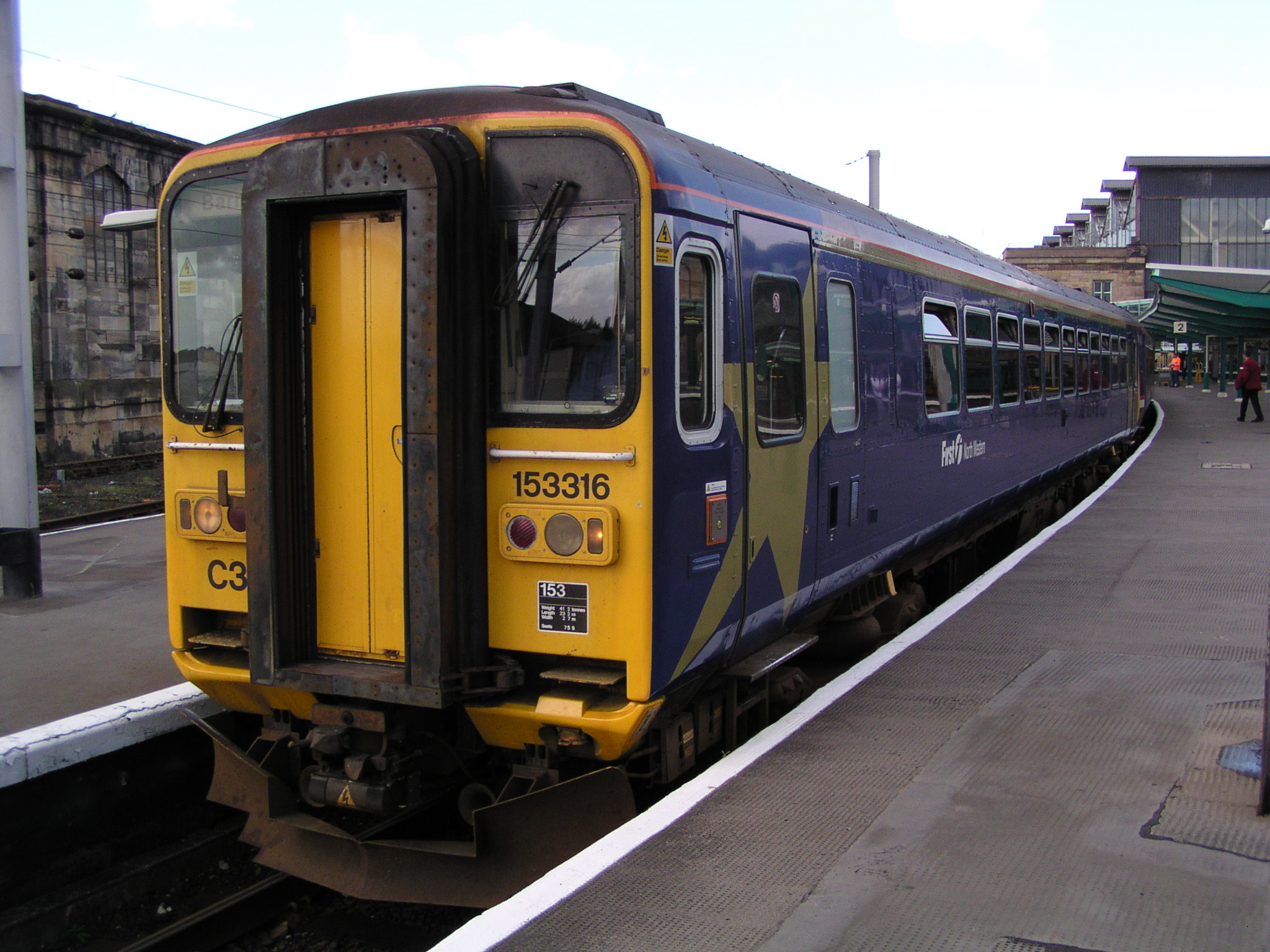
North Western Trains liveried Class 153 at Carlisle station in August 2004

First North Western's diesel fleet was maintained at Newton Heath Depot, and the electric fleet at Longsight Depot. The Class 175s were maintained at a purpose built depot in Chester.

== Demise ==
In 2000, the Strategic Rail Authority announced that it planned to create a new TransPennine Express franchise transferring First North Western's Barrow-in-Furness and Windermere services, with the North Wales Coast Line services transferred to a new Wales & Borders franchise and the remaining services combined with those of Arriva Trains Northern to form a new Northern Rail franchise.

On 28 September 2003, the North Wales Coast Line services transferred to Wales & Borders.

In July 2003, the Strategic Rail Authority awarded the TransPennine franchise to FirstGroup/Keolis with services operated by First North Western transferring to First TransPennine Express on 1 February 2004.

In July 2004, the Strategic Rail Authority awarded the Northern Rail franchise to a 50:50 joint venture between Serco and NedRailways with the remaining services operated by First North Western transferring to Northern Rail on 12 December 2004.

Preceded by Regional Railways (Network NorthWest); As part of British Rail	Operator of the North West Regional Railways franchise 1997–2004	Succeeded by Wales and Borders; Wales & Borders franchise (North Wales Coast services)
Preceded by Regional Railways (Network NorthWest); As part of British Rail	Operator of the North West Regional Railways franchise 1997–2004	Succeeded by First TransPennine Express; TransPennine Express franchise
Preceded by Regional Railways (Network NorthWest); As part of British Rail	Operator of the North West Regional Railways franchise 1997–2004	Succeeded by Northern Rail; Northern Rail franchise
