= British Rail Class 129 =

- In service: 1958–1973
- Manufacturer: Cravens
- Order no.: 30418
- Family name: First generation
- Replaced: Steam locomotives and carriages
- Constructed: 1955
- Entered service: 1958
- Scrapped: 1975; 1986
- Number built: 3
- Number scrapped: All
- Formation: Single car: DMLV
- Diagram: BR531
- Fleet numbers: 55997-55999
- Capacity: Luggage space only
- Operator: British Railways
- Depots: Chester; Newton Heath
- Line served: London Midland Region

Specifications
- Car body construction: Steel
- Car length: 57 ft 6 in (17.53 m) (over body ends)
- Width: 9 ft 3 in (2.82 m) (overall)
- Height: 12 ft 4 1/2 in (3.772 m) (over roof)
- Doors: Slam
- Wheelbase: 40 ft 0 in (12.19 m) (bogie centres); 8 ft 6 in (2.59 m) (bogies)
- Maximum speed: 70 mph (113 km/h)
- Weight: 30 long tons (30 t; 34 short tons)
- Prime mover: 2 × BUT (AEC) 150 hp (110 kW)
- Power output: 300 hp (220 kW)
- Braking system: Vacuum
- Coupling system: Screw
- Multiple working: ♦ Yellow Diamond
- Track gauge: 1,435 mm (4 ft 8 1/2 in) standard gauge

The British Rail Class 129 was a class of single car diesel multiple units (DMU) built in 1955 for British Rail. Only three were built by Cravens and were introduced in 1958. The class was built for parcels traffic like the Class 128. One unit (55997) survived into departmental service being named 'Hydra'. The driving ends of a Class 129 car bore a visible similarity to that of the Class 105, also built by Cravens.

== Departmental usage ==
One unit, M55997, was converted as a test bed for hydrostatic drive in 1980, was renumbered RDB 975385, and named Laboratory 9 ‘Hydra’.
