= Tyseley TMD =

Railway depot in Birmingham, England

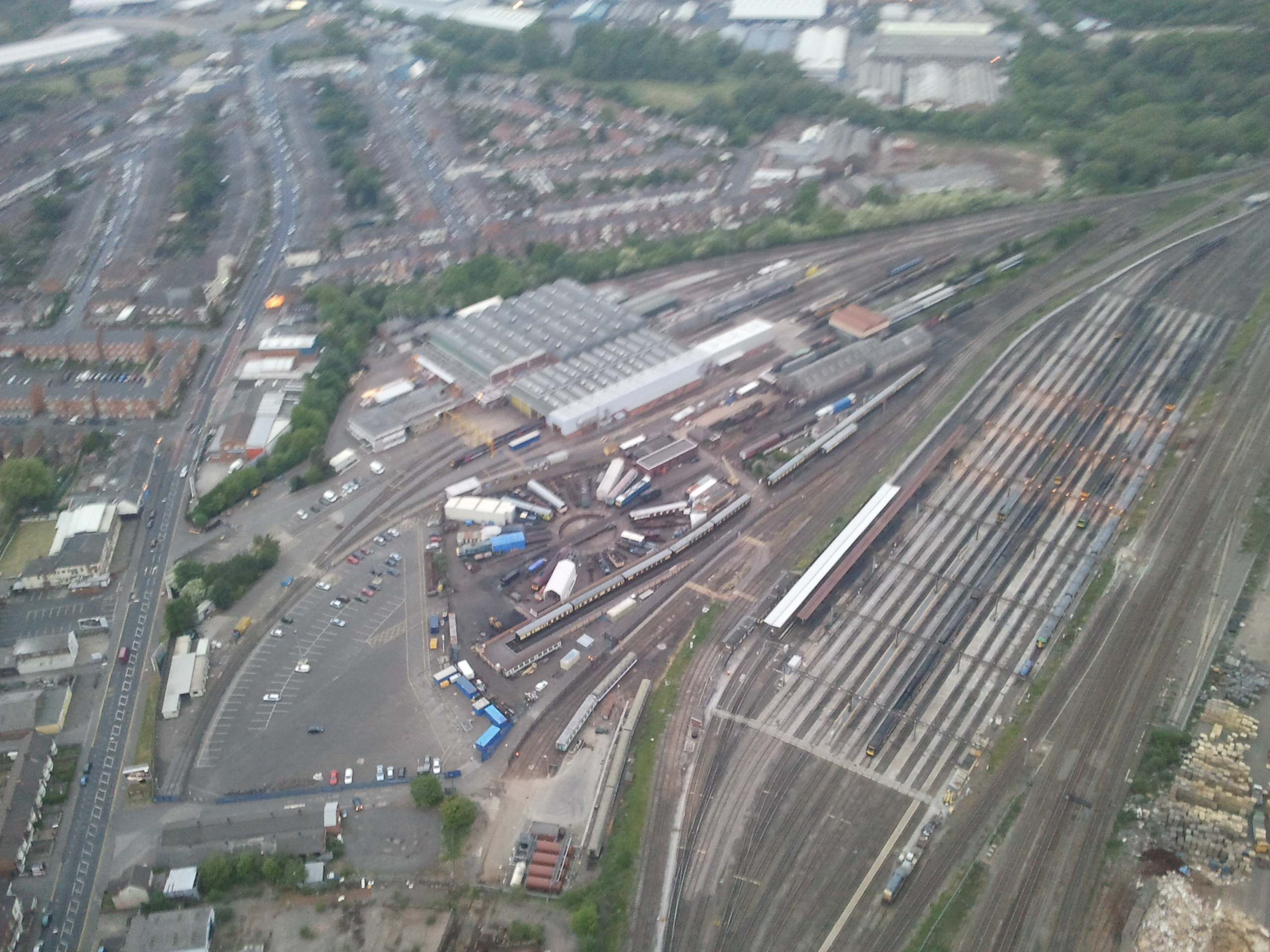
- Tyseley Traction Maintenance Depot (top); Tyseley Locomotive Works (around the turntable); and carriage sidings
- Interactive map of Tyseley TMD

Location
- Location: Tyseley, Birmingham, England
- Coordinates: 52.4552°N 1.8447°W
- OS grid: SP105842

Characteristics
- Operator: West Midlands Trains
- Depot code: TS (1973-)
- Type: DMU

History
- Opened: 1908
- Former depot code: TYS; 84E (1948-1963); 2A (1963-1973)

Tyseley TMD is a railway traction maintenance depot situated in Tyseley, Birmingham, England.

== Origins ==
To counter the critic of the Great Western Railway (GWR) actually standing for "The Great Way Round", the GWR started a series of straightening projects between London Paddington and its two major hubs of Taunton and Birmingham. It hence sponsored the Birmingham and North Warwickshire Railway to create a more direct route between south Birmingham and Stratford-upon-Avon, which would bypass the existing route via Lapworth, effectively creating the last mainline railway built in the United Kingdom. The line also provided a new service to Henley-in-Arden, rendering redundant the original GWR branch from Rowington Junction to Henley, which consequently closed to passengers in 1915.

== History ==
=== GWR: TYS/174 ===
The North Warwickshire Line came into operation from 1908, and the GWR immediately adopted it and ran all services. However, its major depot in the area was at Wolverhampton (Stafford Road), and so it needed a facility south of Birmingham.

Its existing locomotive depot at Bordesley was too small, and so land was acquired to build a G.J. Churchward-style twin-turntable layout depot, allowing for extension towards the Warwick Road for two further 65 feet (20 m) turntables should the need arise. The east turntable was nominally allocated to passenger locomotives, the west to freight classes. A standard twin-track ramped coal stage was built in between the entrance roads to the roundhouses, above which was a water softening facility, and associated water tank which stored 98,000 imperial gallons (450,000 L; 118,000 US gal) to supply the entire site. On the west side was a large repair depot which became known as "The Factory", equipped with heavy lifting gear and full engineering facilities to repair and completely overhaul any GWR locomotive. To the east were a series of carriage sidings and maintenance sheds.

The final facility which opened in July 1908, was similar in design to other large GWR depot facilities, such as the original four turntable layout at Old Oak Common. The twin 65 feet (20 m) turntables gave access to 28 roads each of varying length, each with an inspection pit, in total capable of accommodation up to thirty-six tender engines and twenty-eight tank engines.

Most major express trains ran north and terminated or changed engines at Birmingham Snow Hill or Wolverhampton, making access to Wolverhampton (Stafford Road) TMD easier and quicker. Hence Tyseley always played second fiddle to its major regional sister shed, its allocation mostly made up of tank engines and freight locomotives.

Allocated 72 engines on opening in 1908, it fulfilled both local services as well as those heading south from Tyseley South Junction and Bearley to Stratford-upon-Avon, Cheltenham, Gloucester, Bristol, South Wales and the West Country.

The GWR shed code was TYS.

=== British Railways: 84E ===
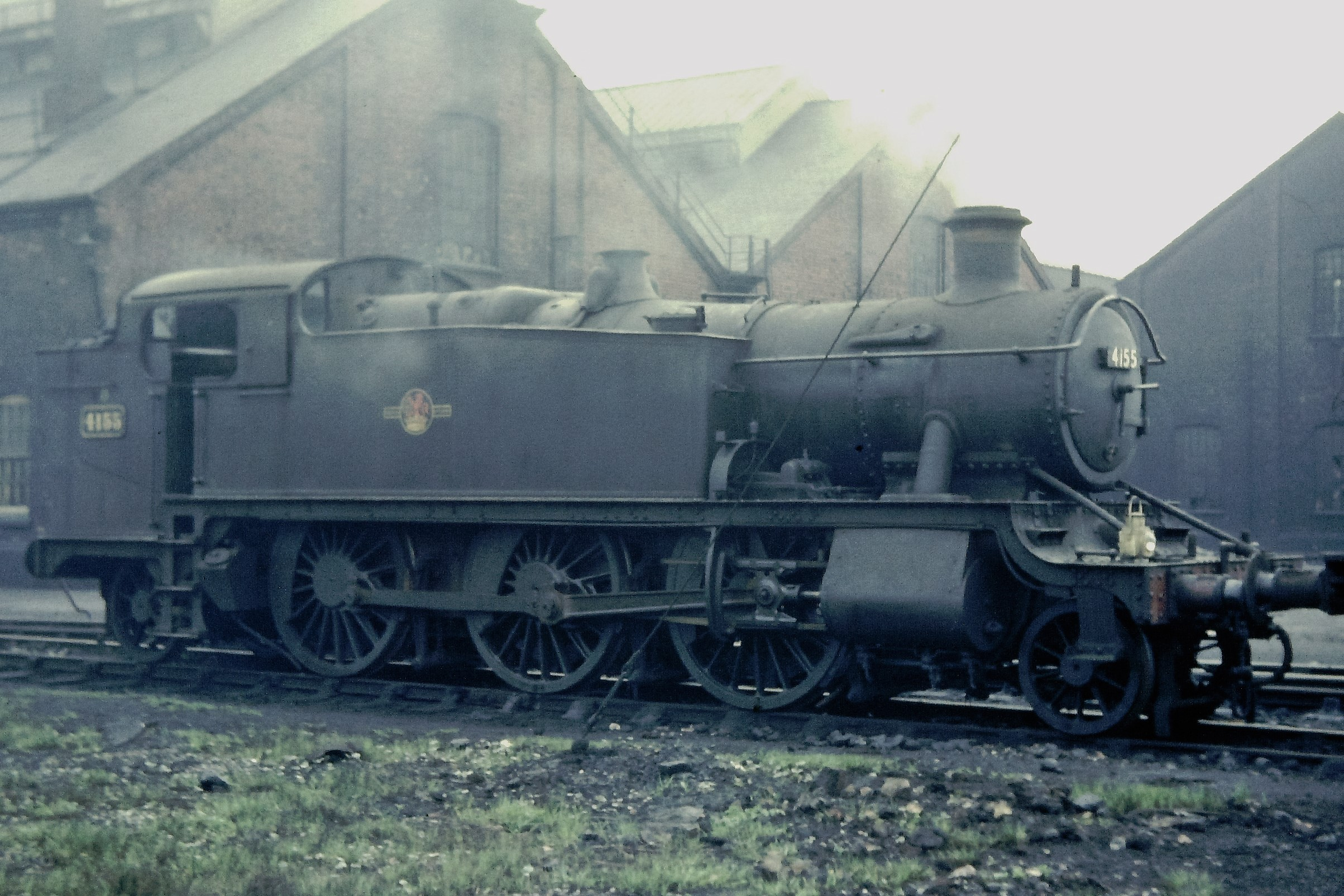
GWR 5101 Class 4155 at Tyseley MPD in 1964

Post nationalisation in 1948, locomotive numbers rose till by the mid-1950s there were 100 engines allocated, a mix of former GWR, LMS and new BR standard classes. In 1957 Diesel Multiple Units were introduced by the Western Region of British Railways, which covered the Birmingham area suburban and local services. A new DMU depot was developed on the extreme west of the site beyond the Factory.

This marked the height of the depot, and beyond this point much of the site was in decline, in part as from 1963 the depot became allocated to the London Midland Region. In the same year the freight turntable and covering shed were demolished, followed in 1964 by the Factory, on top of which a new diesel repair facility was built. The GWR roots of the depot survived until the end, with the last allocated steam locomotives being three Pannier tanks that worked the Hawne Basin on the Dudley Canal from Halesowen railway station, until 1967.

When British Railways allocated depot codes in 1949 (based on the former LMS system), Western Region depots were numbered between 81 and 89, and Tyseley was given the code 84E. Following transfer to the London Midland Region, the depot was given the code 2A in September 1963.

=== British Rail ===
In 1987, the depot had an allocation including Class 08 shunting locomotives and Classes 101, 108, 115, 116, 118, 119, 121, 122, 127 and 128 DMUs. The depot was also a stabling point for Class 20 and 47 locomotives.

=== Privatisation era ===
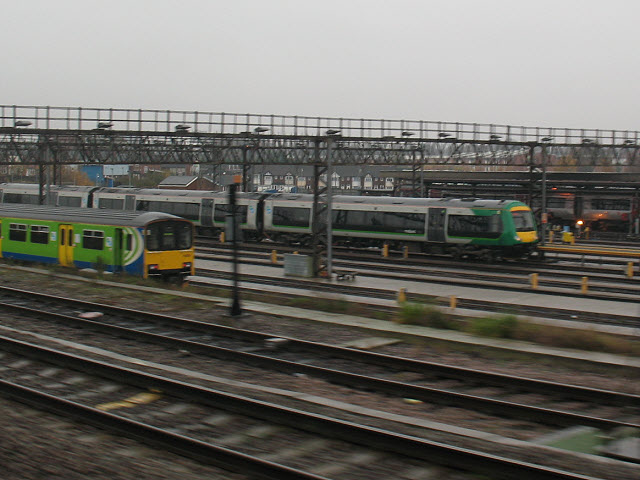
London Midland Class 150 and Class 170 at Tyseley TMD in November 2008

After the privatisation of British Rail, Tyseley TMD was operated by Central Trains. As well as maintaining Central Trains' Class 150, Class 153, Class 156, Class 158 and Class 170s, it also performed heavy maintenance on fellow National Express operator Wessex Trains' fleet. It was transferred with the franchise to London Midland in 2007 and West Midlands Trains in 2017.

== Tyseley Locomotive Works ==
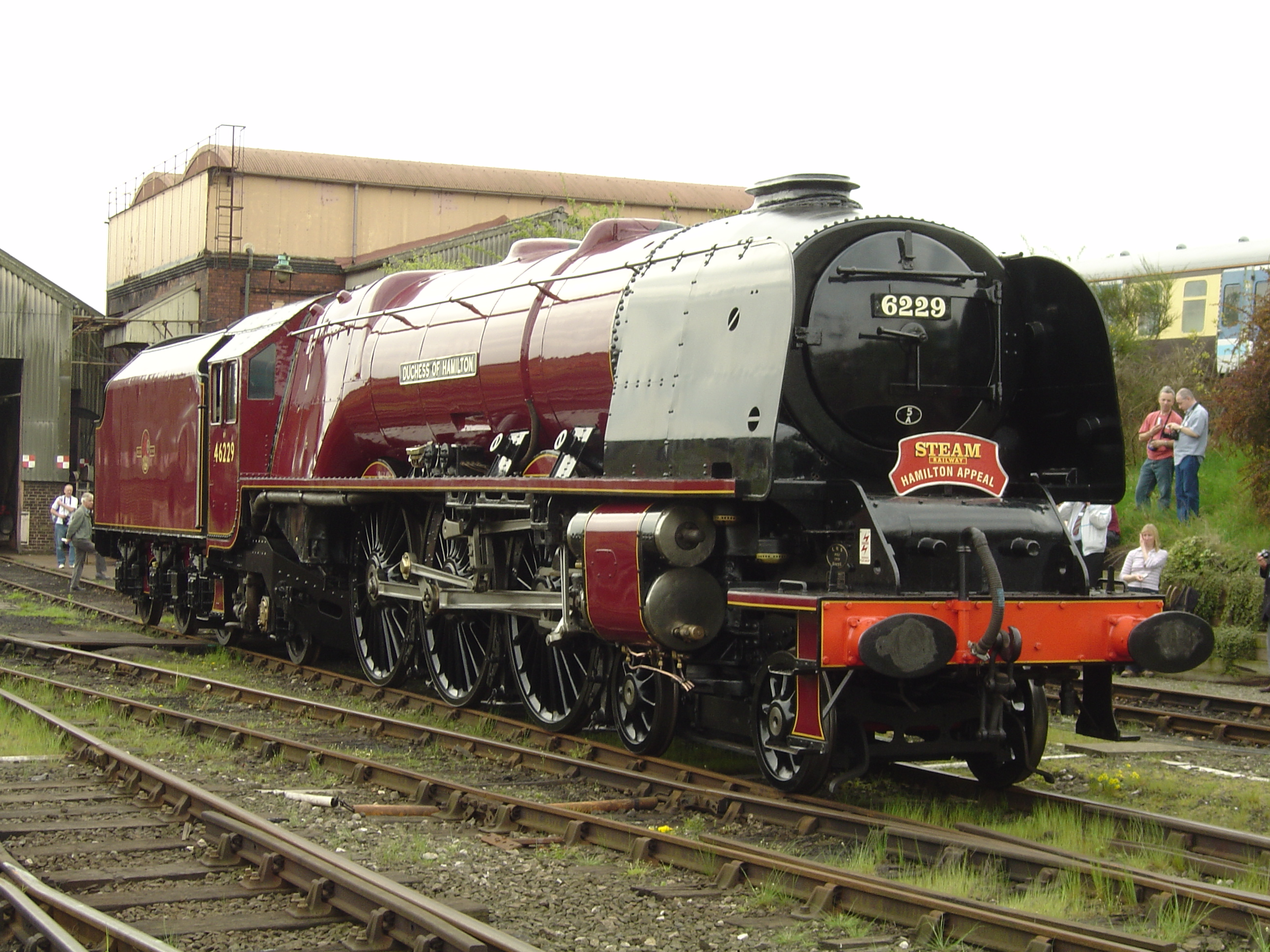
Preserved LMS No.6229 Duchess of Hamilton at Tyseley Locomotive Works. The preserved original GWR coaling stage is visible in the background

With the demise of steam on BR in the summer of 1968, the passenger roundhouse was demolished in the same year, with plans to do similar to the coal stage. However, Patrick Whitehouse the new owner of No.7029 Clun Castle negotiated a lease bid, with plans to adapt it for steam locomotives. This and the fact that Birmingham City Council placed a preservation order on the turntable managed to create a strip of land inside the depot, that today is the Tyseley Locomotive Works.

== Present ==
As of 2025, the depot currently stables and maintains West Midlands Trains Class 172s and Class 196s, as well as CrossCountry Class 170s.

== Incidents ==
On 14 December 2019 Abdul Rehan, a West Midlands Trains driver, died after being caught between two Class 172/3 DMUs that another driver was attempting to couple together. The Rail Accident Investigation Branch determined that WMT had insufficient safe working practices for drivers in depots (especially walking between trains), and also that Rehan had not used the authorised walkway. An inquest in March 2022 returned a verdict of accidental death.

== See also ==
- List of British Railways shed codes
