= British Rail Class 110 =

Diesel multiple unit train, 1961–1991

British Rail Class 110 (BRCW Calder Valley)
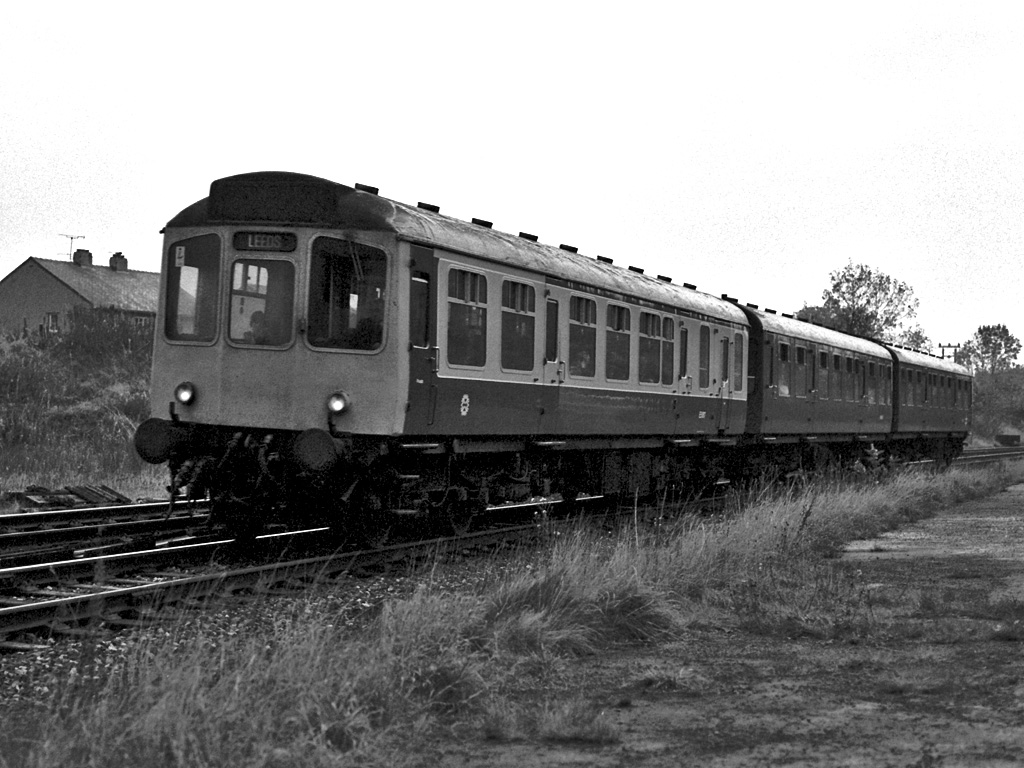
- In service: 1961 – 1991
- Manufacturer: BRCW
- Family name: First generation
- Replaced: Steam locomotives and carriages
- Constructed: 1961–1962
- Refurbished: 1979-80
- Scrapped: 1963-1991
- Number built: 30 sets
- Number preserved: One 3-car set, One 2-car set
- Formation: Three-car sets: DMBC-TSL-DMCL (TSL removed from many sets in 1982)
- Capacity: DMBC: 12 first, 33 second TSL: 72 second DMCL: 12 first 54 second
- Operator: British Rail

Specifications
- Car length: 57 ft 6 in (17.53 m)
- Width: 9 ft 3 in (2.82 m)
- Height: 12 ft 9 in (3.89 m)
- Maximum speed: 70 mph (113 km/h)
- Weight: DMBC: 32 long tons 0 cwt (71,700 lb or 32.5 t); TSL: 24 long tons 0 cwt (53,800 lb or 24.4 t); DMCL: 31 long tons 10 cwt (70,600 lb or 32 t)
- Prime mover: Two Rolls-Royce C6NFLH engines per power car
- Power output: 720 hp (537 kW) per set 180 bhp (130 kW) per engine
- Transmission: 4-speed epicyclic gearbox
- UIC classification: (1A)′(A1)′+2′2′+(1A)′(A1)′
- Braking system: Vacuum
- Safety system: AWS
- Coupling system: Screw-link
- Multiple working: ■ Blue Square
- Track gauge: 4 ft 8 1/2 in (1,435 mm)

The Class 110 diesel multiple units were built by the Birmingham Railway Carriage and Wagon Company in conjunction with the Drewry Car Co. to operate services on the former Lancashire and Yorkshire main line. They originally entered service exclusively in this region, which earned them the name of the 'Calder Valley' sets. They were an updated version of the Class 104, with more powerful engines, a revised cab design and raised bodyside window frames.

== Description ==
The fact that they were primarily intended for services on the arduous Calder Valley route meant that Class 110 needed more power than other first generation DMUs, so they were fitted with 180 hp (130 kW) Rolls-Royce C6NFLH engines, and when delivered they had the highest hp/ton of any of the first generation DMUs, including the lightweights. With a set weighing 87½ tons (tare), this gave a power-to-weight ratio of 8.3 hp / ton, which was appreciably higher than any other DMU in use at the time using normally aspirated engines.

Performance tests included a standing start against a ruling gradient of 1 in 261 and a set in tare condition achieved a speed of 30 mph (48 km/h) in 45 seconds, 50 mph (80 km/h) in 2 minutes 4 seconds, and 70 mph (110 km/h) in 4 minutes 6 seconds. From a standing start on a 1 in 45 gradient a speed of 25 mph (40 km/h) in third gear was reached in 42 seconds. Each set had 24 first class and 159 second class seats.

== Timeline ==
The first twenty sets, for the NER, were ordered in March 1959 and were allocated to Bradford Hammerton Street depot. The second batch were allocated to the LMR in January 1961, based at Newton Heath in Manchester. Deliveries of the two batches was concurrent, starting in 1961, and these were the penultimate class of first generation sets to be built.

All sets were concentrated at Hammerton Street by 1976.

Refurbishment of the class took place in 1979 - 1980, with fluorescent lighting, new seat covers, new internal panelling and mechanical modifications to reduce the occurrence of the fires in the exhaust system which were common on many classes of first generation DMU.

During refurbishment the class was repainted, first in the white livery with a blue stripe below the windows that was standard for refurbished DMUs and later in the standard British Rail blue and Grey livery. All sets that were turned out in the white livery were later repainted in blue and Grey.

The TSLs were removed from most sets and scrapped in 1982 to reduce maintenance costs and to allow a higher performance for an accelerated timetable on the Calder Valley line. At 11.2 hp/ton these sets now had by far the highest power/weight ratio of any first generation DMU, but with a significantly reduced capacity of just 111 seats.

At the same time all First Class seats were declassified to Second although the seats were not replaced.

The reduced capacity caused a problem with the upturn in traffic of the mid 1980s and some sets were supplemented in 1984–85 with centre cars from withdrawn Class 111 units.

Bradford Hammerton Street depot closed in 1984, and all remaining Class 110 units were transferred to Neville Hill in Leeds.

The small fleet size together with maintenance costs of the non-standard Rolls-Royce engines ensured their early withdrawal. The engines were mounted with cylinder heads facing inwards, unlike all other DMU classes, and this required specialised facilities for engine removal which were only available at their home depot. Class 150/2 'Sprinters' were introduced on the Calder Valley route in 1987.

Most displaced units continued in traffic until October 1989, but were no longer common in the Calder Valley.

== Orders ==
Lot No.	Diagram	Car type	Qty	Fleet number	Notes
30592	564	Driving Motor Brake Composite (DMBC)	20	51809–51828	
30593	563	Driving Motor Composite with lavatory (DMCL)	20	51829–51848	
30594	648	Trailer Second with lavatory (TSL)	20	59693–59712	
30691	564	Driving Motor Brake Composite (DMBC)	10	52066–52075	
30692	563	Driving Motor Composite with lavatory (DMCL)	10	52076–52085	
30693	648	Trailer Second with lavatory (TSL)	10	59808–59817	

== Preservation ==
Five vehicles are preserved:

- Lakeside & Haverthwaite Railway two-car set (52071 & 52077)
- Llangollen Railway three-car set (51813, 59701 & 51842)

Set number	Vehicle numbers			Livery	Location	Notes
Set number	DMBC	TSL	DMCL	Livery	Location	Notes
-	51813	59701	51842	BR Green	Llangollen Railway	Undergoing overhaul
-	52071	-	52077	BR Green	Lakeside and Haverthwaite Railway	Operational

=== Model railways ===
In 1982 Hornby Railways launched its first version of the BR Class 110 in OO gauge.
