= List of British Rail diesel multiple unit classes =

British DMU classification system

This is a list of British Rail diesel multiple-unit train classes.

For a historical overview of diesel multiple unit train development in Great Britain, see British railcars and diesel multiple units.

== Pre-nationalisation designs ==
- GWR railcars
- LMS railcars

== First generation ==
=== Early BR DMUs (79xxx series) ===
Manufacturer	Engines (per motor car)	Transmission	Type	Built	Quantity (sets)	Withdrawn	Notes	Image	Scrapped
BR Derby 'Lightweight'	2 × Leyland 125 bhp (93 kW) or 2 × AEC 150 bhp (112 kW)	hydraulic (2 car) or mechanical (single car)	low density	1954–1959	217 vehicles	1967–1969; 1977–1994 (departmental use)			215
Metro-Cammell 'Lightweight'	2 × AEC 150 bhp (112 kW)	mechanical	low density	1955–1956	36 sets	1967–1969; 1981 (departmental use)			All
AC Cars Railbuses	1 × AEC 150 bhp (112 kW)	mechanical	railbus	1958	5	1968			3 (1 in preservation)
Bristol-ECW Railbuses	1 × Gardner 112 bhp (84 kW)	mechanical	railbus	1958	2	1966			All
Park Royal Railbuses	1 × AEC 150 bhp (112 kW)	mechanical	railbus	1958	5	1966–1968			All
Waggon and Maschinenbau Railbuses	1 × Büssing 150 bhp (112 kW)	mechanical	railbus	1958	5	1966–1967			1
Wickham Railbuses	1 × Meadows 105 bhp (78 kW)	mechanical	railbus	1958	6	1966; 1997 (departmental use)			5

=== TOPS classes ===
Class	Manufacturer	Engines (per motor car)	Transmission	Type	Built	Quantity (sets)	Withdrawn	Notes	Image	Scrapped
Class 100	Gloucester RC&W	2 × AEC 150 bhp (112 kW)	mechanical	low density	1957–1958	40 sets (80 cars)	1969–1988			About 79 (3 in preservation)
Class 101	Metro-Cammell	2 × AEC 150 bhp (112 kW)	mechanical	low density	1956–1960	527 sets	1957 (1); 1978–2003; 2009–2012 (departmental use)			About 502 (9 in preservation)
Class 102	Metro-Cammell	2 × Leyland 150 bhp (112 kW)	mechanical	low density	1956–1960	106 sets	1957 (1); 1978–2003; 2009–2012 (departmental use)			About 502 (9 in preservation)
Class 103	Park Royal	2 × AEC 150 bhp (112 kW)	mechanical	low density	1957	20 sets (40 cars)	1972–1983; 1985–1990 (departmental use)		The rear oil lamp being placed on a Class 103 at Kingswear station.	About 19 (3 in preservation)
Class 104	Birmingham RC&W	2 × Leyland 150 bhp (112 kW)	mechanical	low density	1957–1959	302 cars	1980–1995			About 63
Class 105	Cravens	2 × AEC 150 bhp (112 kW)	mechanical	low density	1956–1959	302 cars	1976–1988; 1989–1990 (departmental use)			About 300
Class 106	Cravens	2 × Leyland 150 bhp (112 kW)	mechanical	low density	1956–1959	302 cars	1976–1988; 1989–1990 (departmental use)			About 300
Class 107	BR Derby 'Heavyweight'	2 × AEC 150 bhp (112 kW)	mechanical	low density	1960	26 sets (78 cars)	1973 (1); 1983–1992; 1995 (departmental use)			About 19 sets (66 cars)
Class 108	BR Derby 'Heavyweight'	2 × Leyland 150 bhp (112 kW)	mechanical	low density	1958–1961	333 cars	1964 (1); 1974 (1); 1990–1993			About 138
Class 109	D Wickham & Co	2 × Leyland 150 bhp (112 kW)	mechanical	low density	1957–1958	5 sets	1971			4
Class 110	Birmingham RC&W 'Calder Valley'	2 × Rolls-Royce C6NFLH 180 bhp (134 kW)	mechanical	low density	1961–1962	30 sets	1963 (3); 1971–1972 (3); 1983 (3); 1986–1991			About 28 sets (85 vehicles)
Class 111	Metro-Cammell	2 × Rolls-Royce C6NFLH 180 bhp (134 kW)	mechanical	low density	1957–1960	23 train sets	1989	Last unpowered car went in 2000		About 23 (50 vehicles)
Class 112	Cravens	1 × Rolls-Royce C8NFLH 238 bhp (177 kW)	mechanical	low density	1959–1960	25 sets (50 cars)	1968–1969			All
Class 113	Cravens	1 × Rolls-Royce C8NFLH 238 bhp (177 kW)	hydraulic	low density	1959–1960	25 sets (50 cars)	1968–1969			All
Class 114	BR Derby 'Heavyweight'	2 × Leyland 230 bhp (172 kW)	mechanical	low density	1956–1957 (entered service 1960)	50 sets (100 cars)	1962 (1); 1965 (1); 1967 (prototype); 1970–1971 (6); 1992; 2004 (departmental use)			About 48 sets (95 vehicles)
Class 115	BR Derby 'Suburban'	2 × Albion 230 bhp (172 kW)	mechanical	high density	1960	41 four-car sets	1991–1994			About 30 sets (149 vehicles; 3 in preservation)
Class 116	BR Derby 'Suburban'	2 × Leyland 150 bhp (112 kW)	mechanical	high density	1957–1961	310 cars	1961 (1); 1983 (32); 1987–1995	2 converted to Class 130		About (304 vehicles; 5 in preservation)
Class 117	Pressed Steel 'Suburban'	2 × Leyland 150 bhp (112 kW)	mechanical	high density	1959–1961	123 cars	1993–2000			30
Class 118	Birmingham RC&W 'Suburban'	2 × Leyland 150 bhp (112 kW)	mechanical	high density	1960	15 sets (45 cars)	1994			About 14 sets (44 cars)
Class 119	Gloucester RC&W 'Cross-Country'	2 × Leyland 150 bhp (112 kW)	mechanical	cross country	1958	84 cars	1992–1995			About 28 sets (81 cars)
Class 120	BR Swindon 'Cross-Country'	2 × AEC 150 bhp (112 kW)	mechanical	cross country	1958	194 cars	1989			About 64 sets (193 cars)
Class 121	Pressed Steel 'Bubble Car'	2 × AEC 150 bhp (112 kW)	mechanical	high density	1960–1961	16 (DMBS); 10 (DTS)	1978 (2); 1991–2017	Last first-generation DMU in service, 55022 is still in departmental use.		12 (2 in preservation)
Class 122	Gloucester RC&W 'Bubble Car'	2 × AEC 150 bhp (112 kW)	mechanical	high density	1959	20 (DMBS); 9 (DTS)	1979–1995; 1998–2011 (departmental use)			8
Class 123	BR Swindon 'Intercity'	2 × Albion 230 bhp (172 kW)	mechanical	intercity	1963	40 (Ten 4-car units)	1984	Buffets withdrawn in 1970 and a DMBS and DMSK withdrawn in 1977 and 1979 respectively.		All
Class 124	BR Swindon 'Trans-Pennine'	2 × Albion 230 bhp (172 kW)	mechanical	intercity	1960	Eight 6-car sets, plus 3 spare cars	1972 (3); 1975; 1979–1984			All
Class 125	BR Derby 'Lea Valley'	2 × Rolls-Royce C8NFLH 238 bhp (177 kW)	hydraulic	high density	1958	20 three-car sets	1971 (1); 1976–1977; 1986–1988 (departmental use)			All
Class 126	BR Swindon 'Intercity'	2 × AEC 150 bhp (112 kW)	mechanical	intercity	1959	22	1970 (1); 1973 (3); 1979–1982			About 21 (62 cars; 3 in preservation)
Class 127	BR Derby 'Bed-Pan'	2 × Rolls-Royce C8NFLH 238 bhp (177 kW)	hydraulic	high density	1959	30 sets (120 vehicles)	1964 (1); 1966 (1); 1968 (1); 1972 (1); 1975–1977 (8); 1982–1993	22 rebuilt in 1985		About 27 vehicles (112 vehicles; 3 in preservation)
Class 128	Gloucester RC&W 'Parcels'	2 × Albion 230 bhp (172 kW)	mechanical	parcels	1959–1960	10	1971 (1); 1979–1980 (2); 1982 (2); 1990			All
Class 129	Cravens 'Parcels'	2 × Leyland 150 bhp (112 kW)	mechanical	parcels	1955 (entered service 1958)	3	1972–1973; 1986 (departmental use)			All
Class 130	Parcels conversion from Class 116	2 × Leyland 150 bhp (112 kW)	mechanical	parcels	1957–1961 (converted 1969)	2	1972	Parcels conversion from Class 116		All
Class 131	Parcels conversion from Class 122	2 × AEC 150 bhp (112 kW)	mechanical	parcels	1959 (converted 1966/69/71)	3	1976	Parcels conversion from Class 122		All

== Second generation ==
=== Lightweight railcars ===
Class	Manufacturer	Date Built	Number Built	Withdrawn	Image	Scrapped
Class 139	Parry People Movers	2008	2 × single cars	still in use		None

=== Pacers ===
Class	Manufacturer	Date Built	Number Built	Withdrawn	Image	Scrapped
Leyland; Prototypes	BREL-Leyland	1978–1984	4 × single cars	1978–1997		None
Class 140	BREL-Leyland	1980	1 × 2-car set	1981		None
Class 141	BREL-Leyland	1984	20 × 2-car sets	Britain 1997, Iran 2005		4 (2 in preservation)
Class 142	BREL-Leyland	1985–1987	96 × 2-car sets	2019–2021		52
Class 143	Barclay-Alexander	1985–1986	25 × 2-car sets	2020 (GWR) 2021 (TFW)		5
Class 144	BREL-Alexander	1986–1987	13 × 2-car and 10 × 3-car sets	2020		1

=== Sprinters ===
Class	Manufacturer	Date Built	Number Built	Withdrawn	Image	Scrapped
Class 150; Sprinter	BREL	1984–1987	135 × 2-car and 2 × 3-car sets	Still in use		3 (equiv.)
Class 151	Metro-Cammell	1985	2 × 3-car units	1989		Both
Class 152	N/A	Never built	Proposed single car conversion of Class 156	Never built		Never built
Class 153; Super Sprinter	BREL-Leyland	1991–1992	70 × single cars (Converted from Class 155)	Still in use		12
Class 154	BREL	1985	1 × 3 car unit converted from Class 150	Converted back to Class 150		None
Class 155; Super Sprinter	BREL-Leyland	1987–1988	42 × 2-car sets 7 × 2-car sets still in original form	Still in use		None
Class 156; Super Sprinter	Metro-Cammell	1987–1989	114 × 2-car sets	Still in use		None
Class 157; Strathclyde Sprinter	N/A	Never built	Proposed Strathclyde PTE Sprinter	Never built		Never built
Class 158; Express Sprinter	BREL	1989–1992	165 × 2-car and 17 × 3-car sets	Still in use		1
Class 159; South Western Turbo	BREL	1992–1993	22 × 3-car sets	Still in use		2 vehicles

=== Turbos ===
==== Networker ====
Class	Manufacturer	Date Built	Number Built	Withdrawn	Image	Scrapped
Class 165; Networker Turbo	BREL/ABB York	1990–1992	49 × 2-car and 26 × 3-car sets	Still in use		1
Class 166; Networker Turbo Express	BREL/ABB York	1992–1993	21 × 3-car sets	Still in use		None

==== Turbostar ====
Class	Manufacturer	Date Built	Number Built	Withdrawn	Image	Scrapped
Class 168; Clubman	Adtranz/Bombardier, Derby	1998–2004	9 × 3-car and 10 × 4-car sets	Still in use		None
Class 170; Turbostar	Adtranz/Bombardier, Derby	1998–2005	44 × 2-car and 89 × 3-car sets	Still in use		None
Class 171; Turbostar	Bombardier, Derby	2003–2004	9 × 2-car and 6 × 4-car sets	Still in use	171805 at York Uckfield	None
Class 172; Turbostar	Bombardier, Derby	2010–2011	24 × 2-car and 15 × 3-car	Still in use		None

=== Coradias ===
Class	Manufacturer	Date Built	Number Built	Withdrawn	Image	Scrapped
Class 175; Coradia	Alstom, Washwood Heath	1999–2001	11 × 2-car and 16 × 3-car sets	Still in use		None
Class 180; Adelante	Alstom, Washwood Heath	2000–2001	13 x 5-car sets and 1 x 4-car set (180 110)	Still in use		None

=== Desiro ===
Class	Manufacturer	Date Built	Number Built	Withdrawn	Image	Scrapped
Class 185 Desiro	Siemens	2005–2006	51 × 3-car sets	Still in use		None

=== Civity ===
Class	Manufacturer	Date Built	Number Built	Withdrawn	Image	Scrapped
Class 195 Civity	CAF	2017–2020	25 × 2-car sets 33 × 3-car sets	still in use		None
Class 196 Civity	CAF	2019–2022	12 x 2-car sets 14 x 4-car sets	still in use		None
Class 197 Civity	CAF	2020–	51 x 2-car sets 26 x 3-car sets	still in use		None

== Diesel-electric multiple units (DEMUs) ==
=== Southern Region DEMUs ===
Class	SR code	Built	Quantity (sets)	Withdrawn	Image	Scrapped
Class 201	6S	1957–1958	7 × 6-car sets	1986		About 5
Class 202	6L	1957–1958	9 × 6-car sets	1986		About 8 (46 cars)
Class 203	6B	1958	7 × 6-car sets	1990		5
Class 204	2H/3T	1957	4 × 3-car sets (formed using Class 205 and 206 cars)	1987		About 3 (19 vehicles)
Class 205	2H/3H	1957–1962	4 × 2-car and 29 × 3-car sets	1992–2004		About 21
Class 206	3R	1964	6 × 3-car sets (formed using Class 201 and 416 cars)	1979		All
Class 207	3D	1962	19 × 3-car sets	1990–2004		About 16

=== Second Generation ===
Class	Manufacturer	Date Built	Number Built	Withdrawn	Notes	Image	Scrapped
Class 210	BREL, Derby	1982	1 × 3-car and 1 × 4-car set	1987	mostly scrapped, with 1 carriage preserved and 2 carriages converted to Class 455	210001 at Reading for a service to Didcot	4 carriages
Class 230; D-Train	Metro-Cammell (original builders); Vivarail (conversion)	2015 (prototype)	1 × 3-car set (prototype); 3 × 2-car 5 × 3-car	still in use	Converted from former London Underground D78 Stock		None
Class 231; FLIRT	Stadler	2021–2022	11 × 4-car sets	still in use			None
Class 769; Flex	BREL, York; Brush Traction (conversion)	2017	35 × 4-car sets	still in use	Converted from Class 319 EMUs		None

=== Voyager-style express DEMUs ===
Class	Manufacturer	Date Built	Number Built	Withdrawn	Image	Scrapped
Class 220; Voyager	Bombardier, Bruges, Belgium	2000–2001	34 × 4-car sets	still in use		None
Class 221; Super Voyager	Bombardier, Bruges, Belgium	2001–2002	4 × 4-car and 40 × 5-car sets	still in use		None
Class 222; Meridian/Pioneer	Bombardier, Bruges, Belgium	2003–2005	4 × 4-car, 7 × 9-car and 17 × 5-car sets	still in use		None

=== High-speed trains ===
Class	Manufacturer	Information	Date Built	Number Built	Withdrawn	Image	Scrapped
Class 251	Metro-Cammell	Blue Pullman	1959–1960	2 × 6-car 3 × 8-car	1973		All
Class 252	BREL	Prototype HST	1972	1 × 10-car plus 2 spare coaches	1982		2 vehicles
Class 253	BREL	HST	1975–1982	58 × 9-car	still in use		22
Class 254	BREL	HST	1975–1982	36 × 10-car	still in use		22
Class 255	BREL	HST Challenger	2002 (planned refurbishment)	14 (planned)	Never built		Never built
Class 800	Hitachi Kudamatsu & Newton Aycliffe	Electro-diesel units designed with both pantograph for OHLE use and internal diesel powerplant for non-electrified lines	2014–2019	46 × 5-car 13 × 9-car	still in use		None
Class 802	Hitachi Kudamatsu & Pistoia	Electro-diesel units designed with both pantograph for OHLE use and internal diesel powerplant for non-electrified lines	2017–2020	27 x 5-car 7 x 9-car	still in use		None
Class 805	Hitachi Newton Aycliffe	Electro-diesel units designed with both pantograph for OHLE use and internal diesel powerplant for non-electrified lines	2021–	13 x 5-car	still in use		None
Class 810	Hitachi Newton Aycliffe	Electro-diesel units designed with both pantograph for OHLE use and internal diesel powerplant for non-electrified lines	2021–	33 × 5-car	rollout underway		None

== See also ==
- List of British Rail classes
- List of British Rail modern traction locomotive classes
- List of British Rail electric multiple unit classes
- British Rail locomotive and multiple unit numbering and classification
- British Rail coach type codes
