= Class 110 =

Class 110 may refer to:

- British Rail Class 110 diesel multiple unit
- DB Class E 10 locomotive of German national rail system
- DR Class V 100 locomotive, redesignated Class 110 in 1970
