= Manchester Victoria (disambiguation) =

Manchester Victoria may refer to:

- Manchester Victoria railway station
  - Manchester Victoria Reversing Sidings
  - Manchester Victoria stabbing attack
- Victoria Park, Manchester
- Victoria University of Manchester
