= Class 113 =

Class 113 can refer to:

- Class 113 - British diesel multiple unit, a version of the Class 112
- DB Class E 10 - German electric locomotive
