= British Rail Class 128 =

British diesel multiple unit for parcels

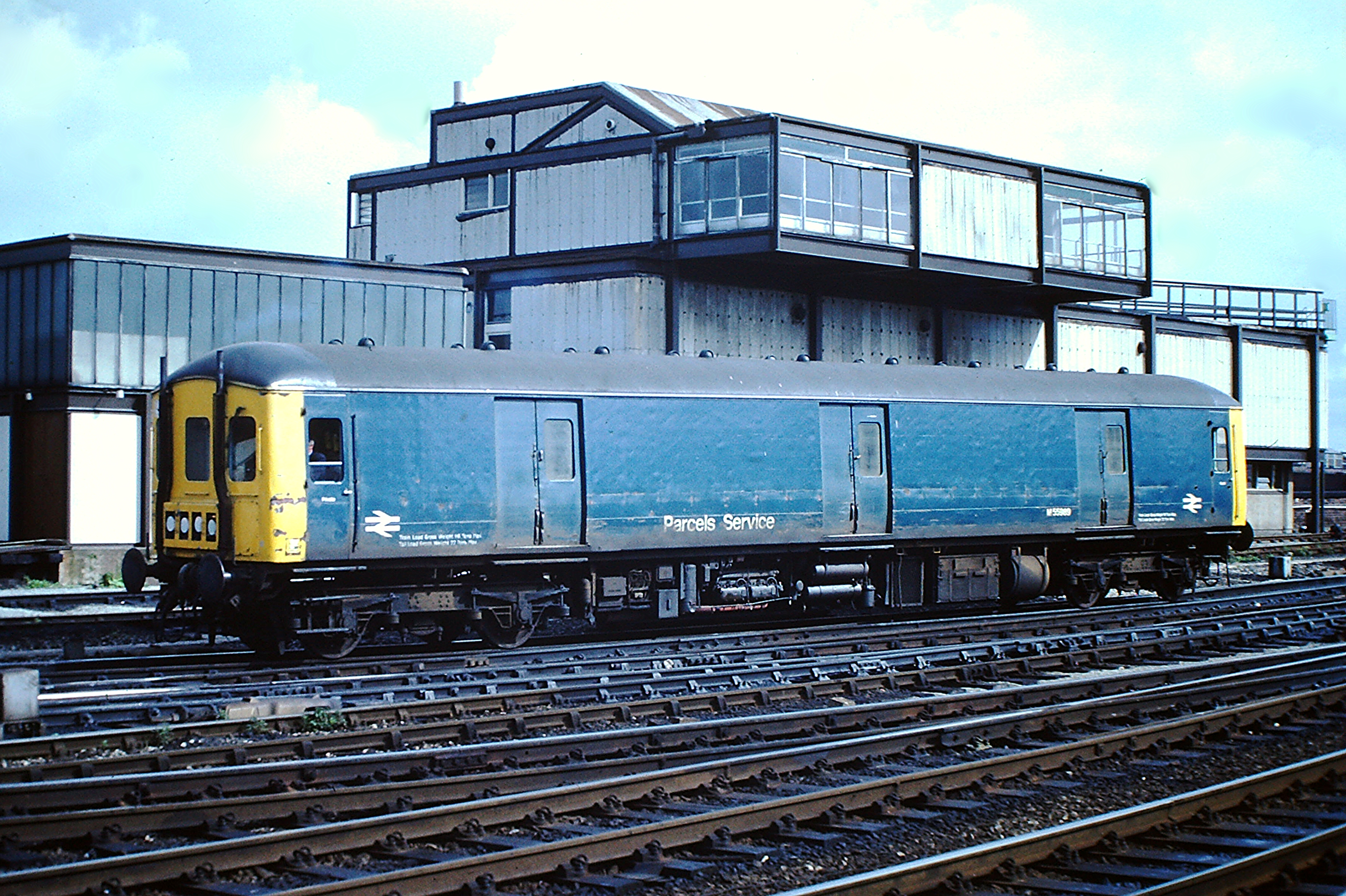
- M55989 Post Office motor parcels van at Manchester Victoria, 1982
- In service: 1959–1990
- Manufacturer: Gloucester Railway Carriage and Wagon Company
- Order no.: 30551 (55991-55996); 30552 (55987-55990)
- Family name: First generation
- Replaced: Steam locomotives and carriages
- Constructed: 1959-1960
- Entered service: 1959
- Scrapped: 1971-1991
- Number built: 10
- Number scrapped: All
- Formation: Single car: DMPMV
- Diagram: DX501 or BR643; DX502 or BR644
- Fleet numbers: 55987-55996
- Capacity: Luggage space only
- Operators: British Rail
- Depots: CA Cambridge; CH Chester; NH Newton Heath; RG Reading; TY Tyseley
- Lines served: Western Region (1960-1988); London Midland Region; Eastern Region (1988-1990)

Specifications
- Car body construction: Steel
- Car length: 64 ft 6 1/8 in (19.663 m) (over body)
- Width: 9 ft (2.7 m) (over body at waist)
- Height: 12 ft 8 1/4 in (3.867 m) (over vents)
- Floor height: 4 ft 3 7/16 in (1.307 m)
- Doors: Slam for cab, sliding for luggage
- Wheelbase: 46 ft 6 in (14.17 m) (bogie centres); 8 ft 6 in (2.59 m) (bogies)
- Maximum speed: 70 mph (110 km/h)
- Weight: 41.5 tonnes (40.8 long tons; 45.7 short tons) (Diagram DX501); 40.5 tonnes (39.9 long tons; 44.6 short tons) (Diagram DX502)
- Prime mover(s): 2 × 230 hp (170 kW) Leyland Albion RE901
- Engine type: Diesel
- Cylinder count: 6 (horizontal)
- Power output: 460 hp (340 kW)
- Transmission: Mechanical
- HVAC: Oil burning air heater
- UIC classification: Bo'Bo'
- Bogies: Derby
- Braking system(s): Vacuum
- Safety system(s): AWS
- Coupling system: Screw
- Multiple working: ■ Blue Square
- Track gauge: 4 ft 8 1/2 in (1,435 mm)

The British Rail Class 128 was a class of diesel multiple unit, built for British Rail. Introduced in 1959, ten of the class were built by Gloucester Railway Carriage and Wagon Company, each with two 230 hp British United Traction - Albion engines. The class was built specifically for parcels, fitted out with parcel racks and bike storage at each end, and did not feature any passenger accommodation. The last members of the class were withdrawn in 1990 and broken up the following year, and none were preserved.

== Numbering ==
Table of orders and numbers
Lot No.	Type	Diagram	Qty	Fleet numbers	Notes
30551	Gangwayed Motor Parcels Van	643 or DX501	6	W55991–W55996	Worked on the Western Region
30552	Non-gangwayed Motor Parcels Van	644 or DX502	4	M55987–M55990	Worked on the London Midland Region

== Livery ==
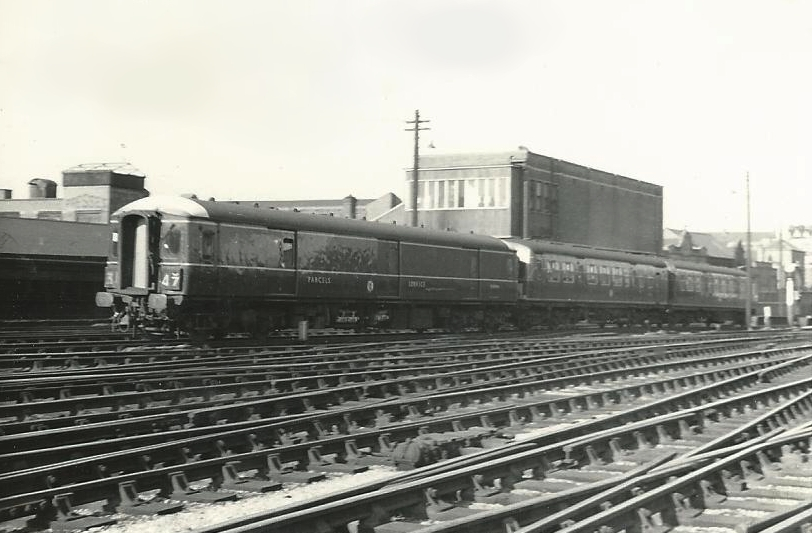
British Rail Green Livery, 1967

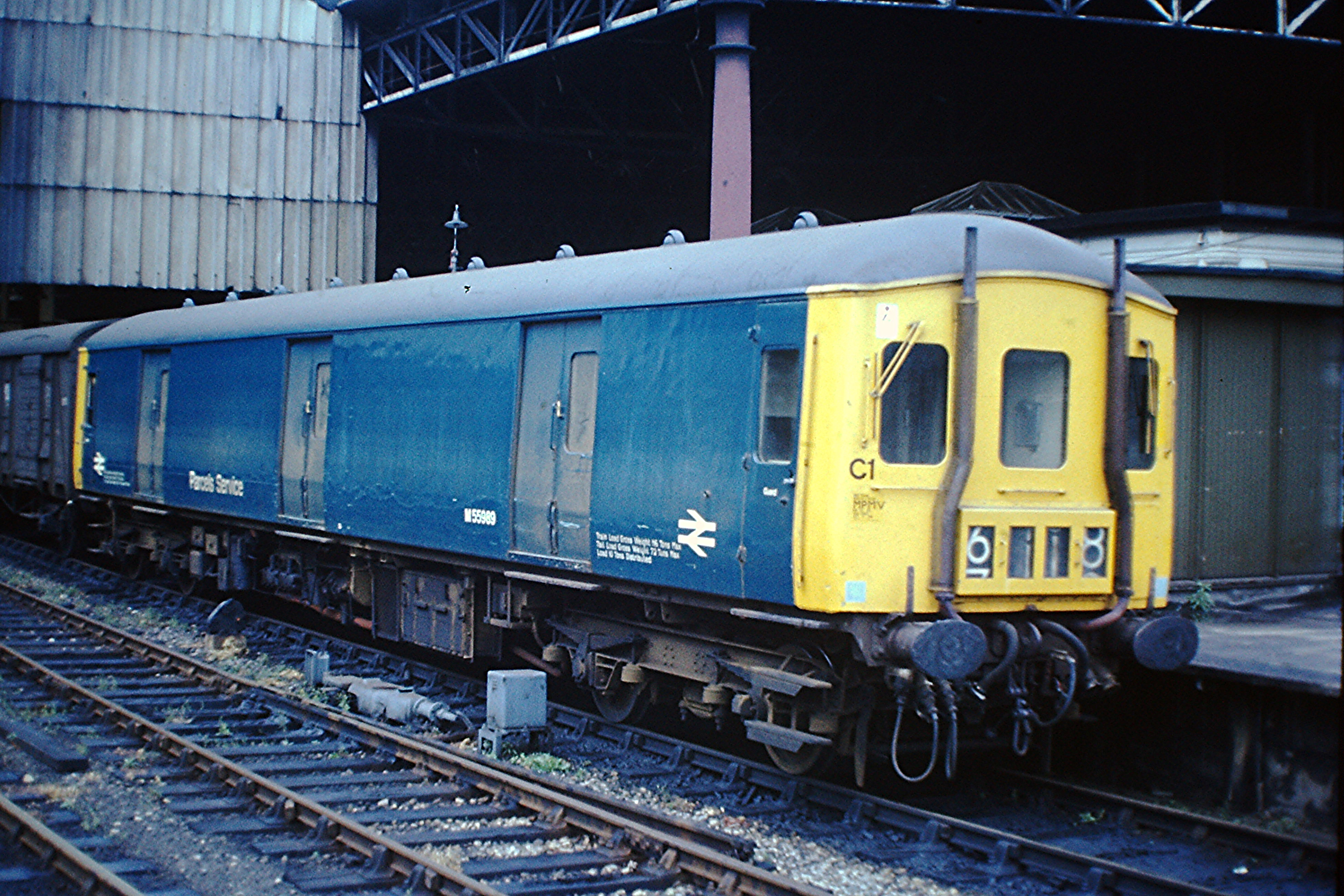
British Rail Blue livery, 1982

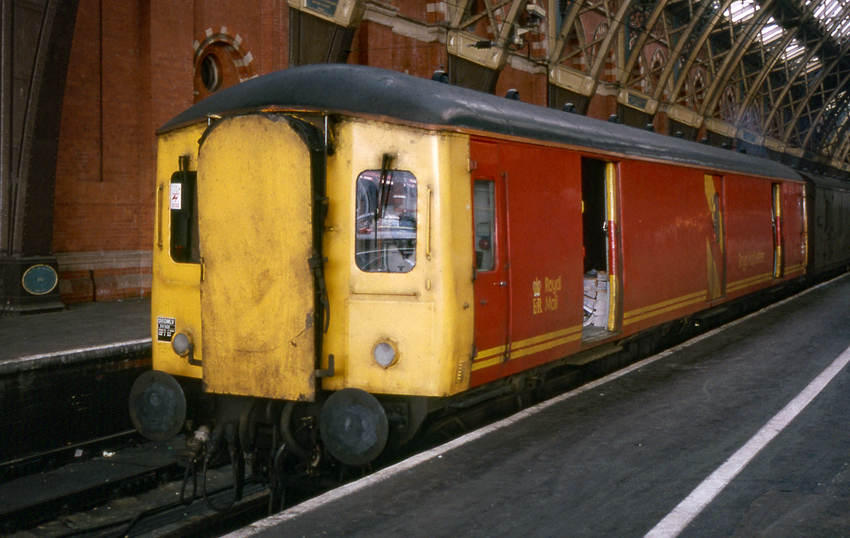
Royal Mail Livery, 1990

== Operation ==
Introduced in 1959, the Class 128s were given the TOPS classification DXV in 1973. By 1978, the initial unit M55987 had been withdrawn, and four of the six units originally intended for use on the Western Region had moved to the Midland Region.

== Models ==
Heljan have produced a 00 scale model in British Railways all over green, Rail Blue and Royal Mail Post Office Red liveries, although these only represent the later version with corridor connection. By 2021 these models were no longer in production.

In 2018, Revolution Trains announced that they are to produce six different variants of the Class 128 in N gauge covering BR green, Rail Blue and Royal Mail Red liveries.
