= Manchester Victoria Reversing Sidings =

Train stabling point in Manchester, Greater Manchester

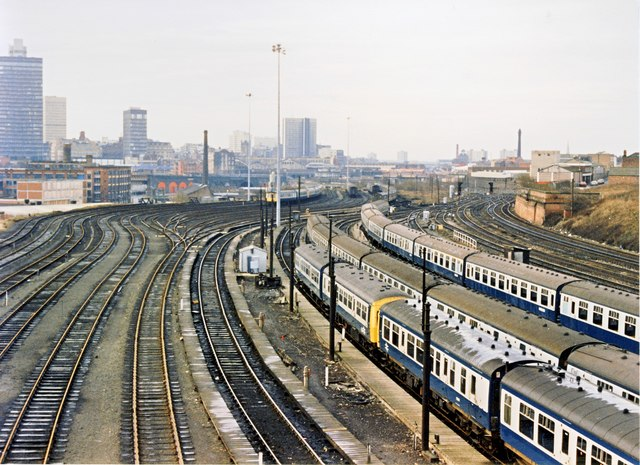
- The sidings in 1989
- Interactive map of Manchester Victoria Reversing Sidings

Location
- Location: Manchester
- Coordinates: 53.4896°N 2.237°W
- OS grid: SJ843992

Characteristics
- Owner: Northern
- Depot code: MV (1973 -)
- Type: EMU

History
- Opened: 1945

Manchester Victoria Reversing Sidings is an electric traction depot located in Manchester, England. The depot is situated on the Liverpool to Manchester Line and is located near Manchester Victoria station.

== History ==
Before its temporary closure in 1989, the depot was known as Manchester Victoria Red Bank and it was a stabling point for Class 101, Class 104 and 108 DMUs. Newspaper vans also used to be stored here until their nightly duties.

== Present ==
As of 2023, the site has been cleared and all tracks removed. The area at one end is occupied by the Manchester Metrolink Queens Road depot

A turnback location is used at the opposite side of Manchester Victoria station towards Salford where Northern services are stabled between servicesClass 319 EMUs.
