= Rolls-Royce C range engines =

Series of diesel engines

Rolls-Royce C range engines (C6SFL model specifications)

Overview
- Manufacturer: Rolls-Royce Limited

Layout
- Configuration: Six-cylinder, supercharged diesel
- Displacement: 12.17 litres (740 cu in)
- Cylinder bore: 5 1/8 inch (130 mm)
- Piston stroke: 6 inch (152 mm)

Combustion
- Fuel type: Diesel
- Oil system: Dry sump
- Cooling system: Water-cooled

Output
- Power output: 190 brake horsepower (140 kW) at 1,800 rpm
- Torque output: 600 lb⋅ft (810 N⋅m) at 1,300 rpm

The Rolls-Royce C range was a series of in-line 4, 6 and 8 cylinder diesel engines used in small locomotives, railcars, construction vehicles, and marine and similar applications. They were manufactured by the Rolls-Royce Oil Engine Division headed by William Arthur Robotham to 1963, initially at Derby and later at Shrewsbury, from the 1950s through to 1970s.

Although officially termed the C range, they were best known for the most common C6SFL six-cylinder variant. Most had an output of around 200 bhp, with 233 bhp for the final models. Their construction was a conventional water-cooled vertical inline 6 four-stroke diesel engine of 12.17 litres (743 cu in). Most were supercharged by a Roots blower, but there were also variants with a turbocharger or naturally aspirated.

A later addition to the range was the SF65C model. This was a lower-rated version of the C range 6-cylinder engine and shared many of the advantages of the range's component rationalisation. It was available in naturally aspirated or turbocharged variants, and both industrial and marine versions were available.

== Construction ==
The engine was constructed around a monobloc cylinder and crankcase casting. Unusually, this was available in either cast iron or aluminium alloy. The cylinders were replaceable wet liners, with pumped water cooling. Valves were single OHV exhaust and inlet valves. Seven bearings with cross-bolted caps supported the nitrided crankshaft. The fuel injection system was direct, into a toroidal combustion chamber within the aluminium pistons. Supercharging was by a Roots blower driven at twice crankshaft speed, for a boost pressure of 8 psi.

An unusual feature was the ability to build the engines with the flywheel and output drive arranged at either end. The supercharger, fuel injection pump, and other auxiliaries also changed sides. Although the crankshaft always rotated the same way within the block, this was the equivalent of offering left and right-handed rotation engines (the C6SFR variant).

For a diesel at its introduction date of 1951, the engine operated at relatively high speed, up to 1,800 rpm. This was assisted by a viscous torsion damper at the opposite end to the flywheel. High rotational speed made the engine an attractive choice in the developing market for small diesel-hydraulic locomotives.

Variants of the C range engine
Model	Cylinders	Aspiration	Layout	Power	Application
C4NFL	4	Natural	Vertical		
C4SFL	4	Supercharged	Vertical		
C4TFL	4	Turbocharged	Vertical		
C4NFLM	4	Natural	Vertical		Marine
C4SFLM	4	Supercharged	Vertical		Marine
C6NFL	6	Natural	Vertical		
C6SFL	6	Supercharged	Vertical	190 bhp	
C6TFL	6	Turbocharged	Vertical		
C6NFLH	6	Natural	Horizontal	180 bhp	Railcar
C6SFLH	6	Supercharged	Horizontal	233 bhp	Railcar
C6TFLH	6	Turbocharged	Horizontal	315 hp	Railcar
C6NFLM	6	Natural	Vertical		Marine
C6SFLM	6	Supercharged	Vertical		Marine
C6TFLM	6	Turbocharged	Vertical		Marine
C8NFL	8	Natural	Vertical		
C8SFL	8	Supercharged	Vertical	300 bhp	
C8TFL	8	Turbocharged	Vertical		
C8NFLH	8	Natural	Horizontal		Railcar
C8SFLH	8	Supercharged	Horizontal	250 bhp	Railcar
C8TFLH	8	Turbocharged	Horizontal		Railcar
C8NFLM	8	Natural	Vertical		Marine
C8SFLM	8	Supercharged	Vertical		Marine
C8TFLM	8	Turbocharged	Vertical		Marine

== Rolls-Royce Sentinel ==
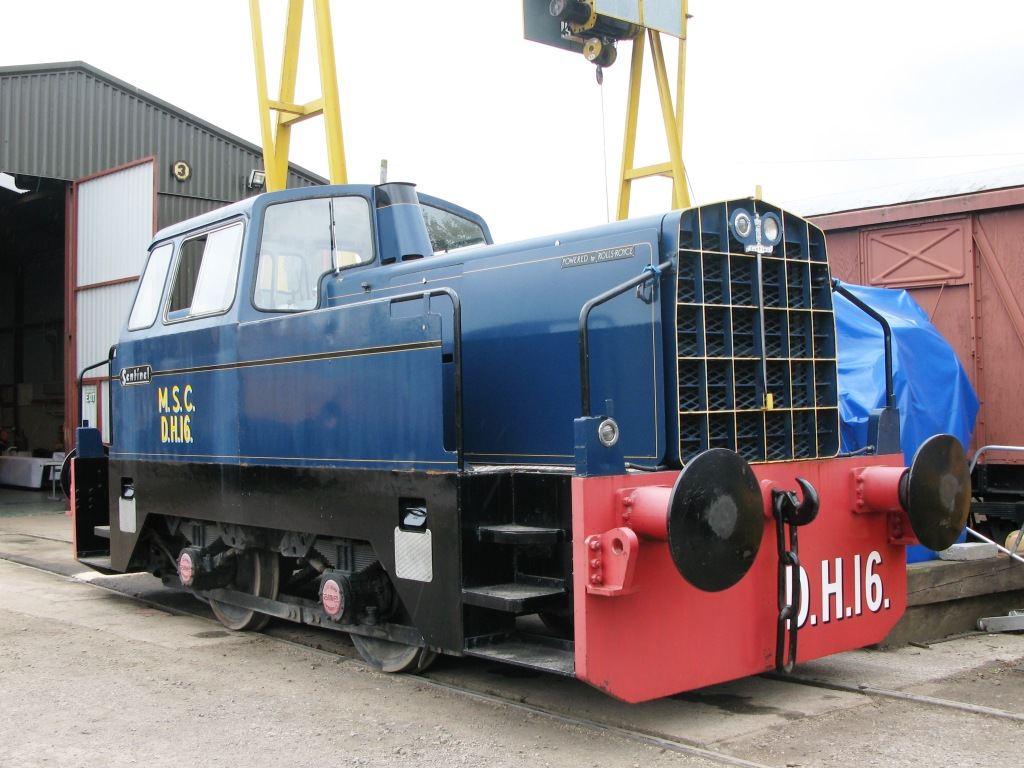
Sentinel diesel locomotive, badged as Powered by Rolls-Royce

In 1957, Rolls-Royce acquired the Sentinel company of Shrewsbury, a builder of steam wagons and small steam locomotives. Production of the C6 was relocated from Derby. Although Rolls-Royce had only intended to build prime movers, i.e. engines here, by the end of 1957 they had decided to continue with Sentinel's previously successful market for small shunting locomotives. This was initially the LB class, 0-4-0 with a typically Sentinel final chain drive, of 1959-1971.

In the 1980s, the Shrewsbury diesel engine plant was acquired by Perkins Engines.

== Horizontal engines ==
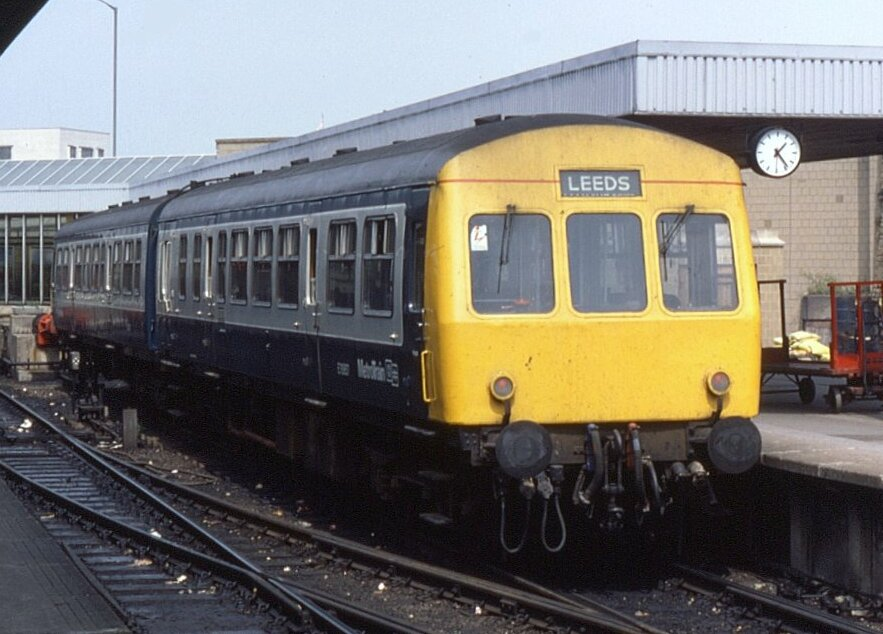
British Rail Class 111 DMU with twin C6NFLH horizontal engines in each power car

The horizontal versions of the C range engine were principally used in railcars / diesel multiple units (DMUs), mounted beneath the floor. "H" in the model number indicated "horizontal". The cylinders were inclined slightly upwards at 17½ degrees. Wet sump lubrication was used. Many of the ancillaries and servicing points were relocated to what were now the sides of the engine, so that they could be serviced from the sides of the railcar, rather than having to lift out floor panels.

=== Australia ===
Forty C6SFLH engines (at two under each vehicle) were fitted in 1960 to new South Australian Railways 300 class railcars.

Twin supercharged C8SFLH engines of 250 hp were used in some of the early New South Wales 620 Class railcars with Twin Disc transmissions, built under licence.

The three South Maitland Railway railcars of 1961 used supercharged C6SFLH units of 233 bhp with a licence-built Twin Disc transmission.

=== Canada and Norway ===
C8SFLH engines and licence built Twin Disc transmissions were used to re-engine a number of Canadian National and Canadian Pacific's Budd railcars.

Norwegian State Railways retrofitted supercharged C6SFLH engines to the Norwegian Class 86 and 91 DMUs.

=== United Kingdom ===
The C6NFLH produced 180 bhp at 1,800 rpm. It was used by Metropolitan-Cammell in the Class 111 DMUs of the late 1950s and 1960s, rather than the 150 bhp BUT engines used in earlier classes. Supercharged C6SFLH units of 230 bhp were trialled in a single Class 111 DMU. Two engines were used for each power car, marshalled into two or three car sets with a power car at each end, giving 720 bhp overall. This extra power was also used for the Birmingham Railway Carriage & Wagon Company built "Calder Valley" sets.

An eight-cylinder version, C8NFLH, of 238 bhp at 1,880 rpm was also used. A single unit was used in each power car of the 112 and 113 classes. These were very similar, the 112 having a mechanical pre-selector transmission and the 113 a Lysholm-Smith Twin-Disc torque converter (licence-built by Rolls-Royce) in a hydraulic transmission. The high density 125 and 127 classes used twin engines.

The C8NFLH, governed to 180 bhp at 1,500 rpm, was also used as the pair of auxiliary generators powering the air-conditioning, lighting and galley of the Blue Pullman sets.

== Vertical engines ==
The vertical versions of the C range were installed in many of the British Rail first-generation diesel multiple units. They were also used in a range of small shunting locomotives, sometimes in pairs for power outputs up to 600 bhp:

- Rolls-Royce Sentinel
- Several diesel-electric and diesel-hydraulic locomotives manufactured by the Yorkshire Engine Company:
  - 170 hp 0-4-0 diesel-hydraulic (also British Rail Class 02) – one C6NFL
  - 200/220 hp 0-4-0 diesel-hydraulic – one C6SFL
  - 200/220 hp 0-4-0 and 0-6-0 diesel-electric – one C6SFL
  - 300 hp 0-4-0 and 0-6-0 diesel-electric – one C8SFL
  - 300 hp 0-6-0 diesel-hydraulic – one C8SFL
  - 400/440 hp 0-6-0 diesel-electric “Janus” – two C6SFL/C6TFL
  - 600 hp Bo-Bo diesel-electric "Olympus" – two C8SFL
  - 600 hp 0-8-0 diesel-hydraulic "Taurus" and "Indus" – two C8SFL
- Midland Railway of Western Australia E class, built by Commonwealth Engineering
- New Zealand DSC class
- BHP Newcastle 37 class diesel-electric - two C6TFL built by A Goninan & Co, Broadmeadow
- Norwegian State Railways Skd 220 (1963–1973)

=== Marine ===
The marine variants of these engines were available in each of the 4, 6 and 8 cylinder models. These marine models were all of the vertical arrangement. Marine gearing options included M.R.F.10 3B, M.R.F.16B, M.R.F.16B/1B and M.R.F.21/B units from Self-Changing Gears, of Coventry and Thornycroft Type B units from Transport Equipment (Thornycroft) Ltd. of Reading.

- Thornycroft 43 ft Range Safety Launch

A pair of C6SFLM (marinised) were used for a speed of 20 knots.

=== Construction vehicles ===
- Vickers-Armstrongs VR180 'Vigor' crawler tractor
- Thornycroft Antar Mk3 heavy tractor unit and tank transporter.
- FV180 Combat Engineer Tractor C6TFR
- International Harvester BTD20 Bulldozer
- Sisu K-50SS ballast tractor

=== Fire appliances ===
- Dennis F101 pumping appliances, especially for use by London Fire Brigade from 1956 onwards.

== See also ==
- Rolls-Royce B range engines
