= British Rail Class 125 =

Class of three-car diesel multiple units

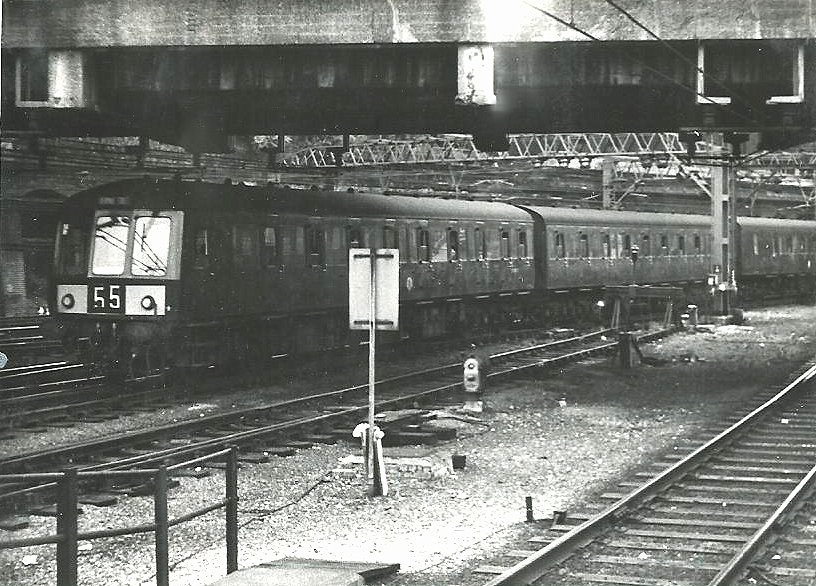
- Class 125 unit entering Liverpool Street in 1966
- In service: 1959–1977
- Manufacturer: BR
- Built at: Derby Works
- Family name: First generation
- Replaced: Steam locomotives and carriages
- Constructed: 1958–1959
- Scrapped: 1971 (1), 1976–1988
- Number built: 20 three-car sets
- Number scrapped: All
- Successor: Class 312
- Formation: DMBS-TS-DMS
- Fleet numbers: 50988 - 51007 (DMS); 51154 - 51173 (DMBS); 59449 - 59468 (DTS)
- Capacity: 266 second-class, no first
- Operator: British Railways
- Depots: Stratford (1959–1969); Finsbury Park (1969–1977)
- Lines served: Lea Valley; West Anglia; East Coast Main Line

Specifications
- Car body construction: Steel
- Car length: 64 ft 0 in (19.51 m) over body
- Width: 9 ft 4 1/2 in (2.858 m)
- Height: 12 ft 9 1/2 in (3.899 m)
- Doors: Slam
- Maximum speed: 70 mph (113 km/h)
- Weight: Power cars: 39.0 long tons (39.6 t; 43.7 short tons); Trailers: 32.0 long tons (32.5 t; 35.8 short tons)
- Prime mover: Two 238-brake-horsepower (177 kW) Rolls-Royce C8NFLH
- Power output: 952 bhp (710 kW) for 3-car set
- Transmission: Hydraulic, Twin-disc (Rolls-Royce) torque converter
- Coupling system: Screw
- Multiple working: Orange Star
- Track gauge: 4 ft 8 1/2 in (1,435 mm)

The British Rail Class 125 was a design of three car diesel multiple unit (DMU) built by BR Derby at Derby Works in 1958. They were almost identical in appearance to the Class 116.

== History ==
The Class 125 was built in 1958 at Derby Works as high capacity suburban railcars specifically for the Lea Valley Lines near Stratford. They were fitted with powerful Rolls-Royce engines, allowing them to have comparable performance to contemporary EMUs. They bore a close resemblance to the similar Class 116, which were also built at Derby. The Class 125 had a unique multiple working code (orange star), due to their unique pneumatic, rather than electric, engine control system. They also had a non-standard jumper cable arrangement and were therefore incompatible with other British Rail diesel multiple unit classes. They were withdrawn in 1977 and like many other first generation DMUs, never wore their Class 125 TOPS classifications.

== Operational history ==
The Class 125 operated semi-fast suburban services on the Lea valley lines until their electrification in 1969, after which they were replaced by EMUs. They also operated commuter services on the West Anglia Main Line. These services were operated alongside locomotive hauled trainsets until the line was also electrified in 1969, after which class 302 and 308 electric multiple units took over the newly electrified routes. The trains were then transferred onto the East Coast Main Line commuter services out of King's Cross, where they worked for the rest of their operational lifetimes.

== Departmental use ==
Two trailers (59458 + 59466) were taken into departmental (non-revenue earning) service in November 1982 and March 1984 as 975993 + 975964. They were used at the Railway Technical Centre in Derby and used as fire test vehicles. They were both withdrawn and scrapped in February 1986 and August 1988.

== Withdrawal and Scrapping ==
The Class 125s were withdrawn from ECML commuter routes in 1977, following the electrification of the ECML. They were then scrapped after a brief time in storage. No class 125 units survive to this day, as they were withdrawn before the interest in preserving multiple units began.

== Numbering ==
Table of orders and Numbers
Lot No.	Type	Diagram	Fleet Number	TOPS Class	Seats	Notes
30462	Driving Motor Second (DMS)	596	50988–51007	125/1	91	
30463	Trailer Second (TS)	597	59449–59468	185	110	
30464	Driving Motor Brake Second (DMBS)	595	51154–51173	125/1	65	

== Liveries ==
They were delivered in an unlined medium shade of Brunswick green with white cab roofs and yellow speed whiskers. The whiskers were replaced during the early 1960s by split yellow warning panels, one either side of the central character train describer which remained green.

During the mid 1960s rail blue appeared, and white cab roofs were gradually dispensed with and buffer beams became black. Initially the yellow warning panels were expanded to cover the complete lower front of the driving cabs and later the whole cab fronts became yellow.
