= British Rail Class 111 =

Class of diesel train

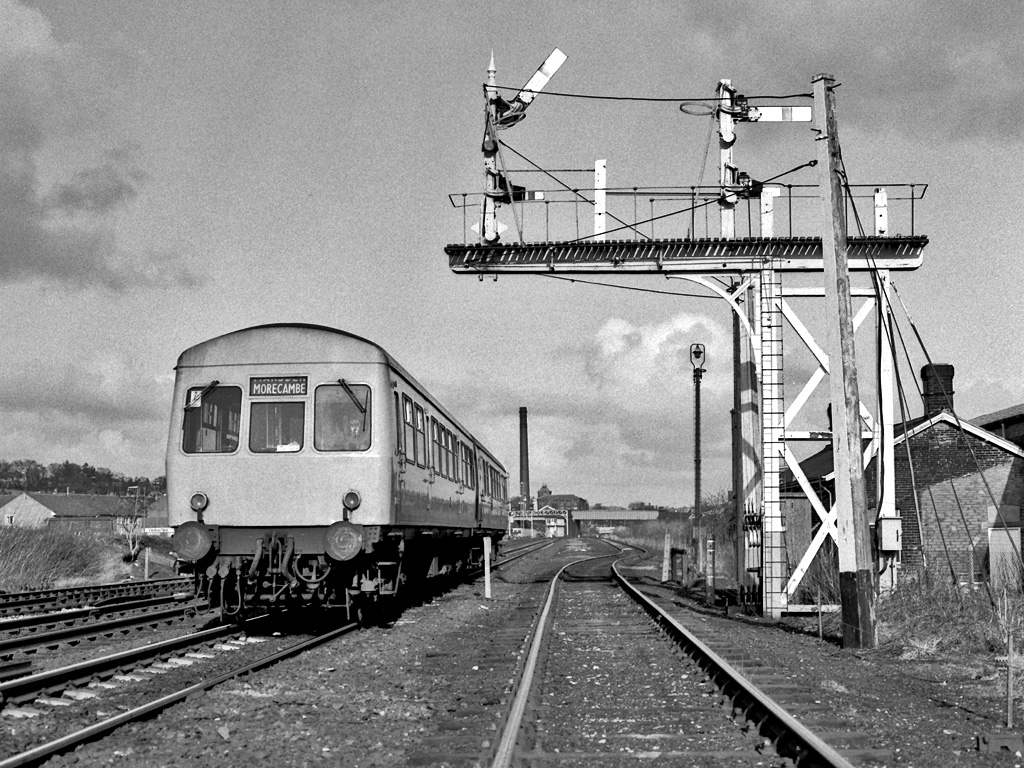
- British Rail class 111 passing Skipton in 1983
- In service: 1957–1989
- Manufacturer: Metropolitan Cammell
- Family name: First generation
- Replaced: Steam locomotives and carriages
- Constructed: 1957–1960
- Number built: 24 sets (DMBS: 24, DMCL: 20, DTCL: 4, TSL: 14, TSBL: 6)
- Number preserved: 1 trailer
- Formation: 2-car sets: DMBS-DTCL or 3-car sets: DMBS-TSL/TSBL-DMCL
- Capacity: DMBS: 52 second DMCL/DTCL: 12 first 53 second TSL: 71 second TSBL: 53 second
- Operator: British Rail

Specifications
- Car length: 57 ft 0 in (17.37 m)
- Width: 9 ft 3 in (2.82 m)
- Height: 12 ft 4 in (3.76 m)
- Maximum speed: 70 mph (113 km/h)
- Weight: Power cars: 33 long tons 0 cwt (73,900 lb or 33.5 t); Trailer cars: 25 long tons 0 cwt (56,000 lb or 25.4 t)
- Prime mover: Two Rolls-Royce C6NFLH
- Power output: 180 hp (134 kW) per engine, 360 hp (268 kW) per power car
- Transmission: Mechanical: 4-speed epicyclic gearbox
- Braking system: Vacuum
- Coupling system: Screw-link
- Multiple working: ■ Blue Square
- Track gauge: 4 ft 8 1/2 in (1,435 mm)

The Class 111 DMUs were based on Class 101/2s, but with different engines. The only external body difference was on the final batch of cars where a four character headcode box was fitted above the front cab windows, with the destination indicator on top of a reduced height centre window.

== History ==
The first cars built, part of an order for 339 Metro-Camm cars, were 4 power/trailer sets for the LMR Manchester area built in early 1957. One of these was equipped with supercharged Rolls-Royce C6SFLH 230 hp 6-cylinder engines. This was followed by ten 3-car sets comprising DMBS/TSL/DMCL for the NER at Bradford, then a further ten 3-car sets. The type lasted in service until 1989 when the class was withdrawn.

| Number | Order | Type | TOPS | Weight | Seats | Lot No. | Diagram | Formation | Year |
|---|---|---|---|---|---|---|---|---|---|
| M50134–50137 | 2d | DMBS | 111/2 | 33 tons | 52 second | 30248 | BR 520 | P/Trailer | 1957 |
| E50270–50279 | 2xb | DMCL | 111/1 | 33 tons | 12 first 53-second | 30268 | BR 616 | 3-car | 1957 |
| E50280–50289 | 2xb | DMBS | 111/2 | 33 tons | 52 second | 30338 | BR 524 | 3-car | 1957 |
| E51541–51550 | 4c | DMBS | 111/2 | 33 tons | 52 second | 30508 | BR 615 | 2/3-car | 1959/60 |
| E51551–51560 | 4c | DMCL | 111/1 | 33 tons | 12 first 53-second | 30509 | BR 617 | 2/3-car | 1959/60 |
| M56090–56093 | 2d | DTCL | 147 | 25 tons | 12 first 53-second | 30337 | BR 628 | P/Trailer | 1957 |
| E59100–59109 | 2xb | TSL | 164 | 25 tons | 71 second | 30269 | BR 623 | 3-car | 1957 |
| E59569–59572 | 4c | TSL | 164 | 25 tons | 71 second | 30510 | BR 623 | 3-car | 1959/60 |
| E59573–59578 | 4c | TSBL | 165 | 25 tons | 53 second | 30615 | BR 625 | 3-car | 1960 |

=== Preservation ===
One car survives, buffet 59575 currently operational at the Great Central Railway. It operates as the centre car between two Class 101 power cars.

== Bibliography ==
- Marsden, Colin J. (1982). Motive Power Recognition: 3 DMUs. Ian Allan. ISBN 0711012016.
- Robertson, Kevin (2004). British Railway Pictorial: First Generation DMUs. Ian Allan. ISBN 0711029709.
- Haresnape, Brian (1985). British Rail Fleet Survey 8: Diesel Multiple Units - The First Generation. Ian Allan. ISBN 0711014957.
- Golding, Brian (1995). A Pictorial Record of British Railways Diesel Multiple Units. Cheona. ISBN 1900298007.
