= British Rail Class 127 =

British diesel multiple-unit passenger trains

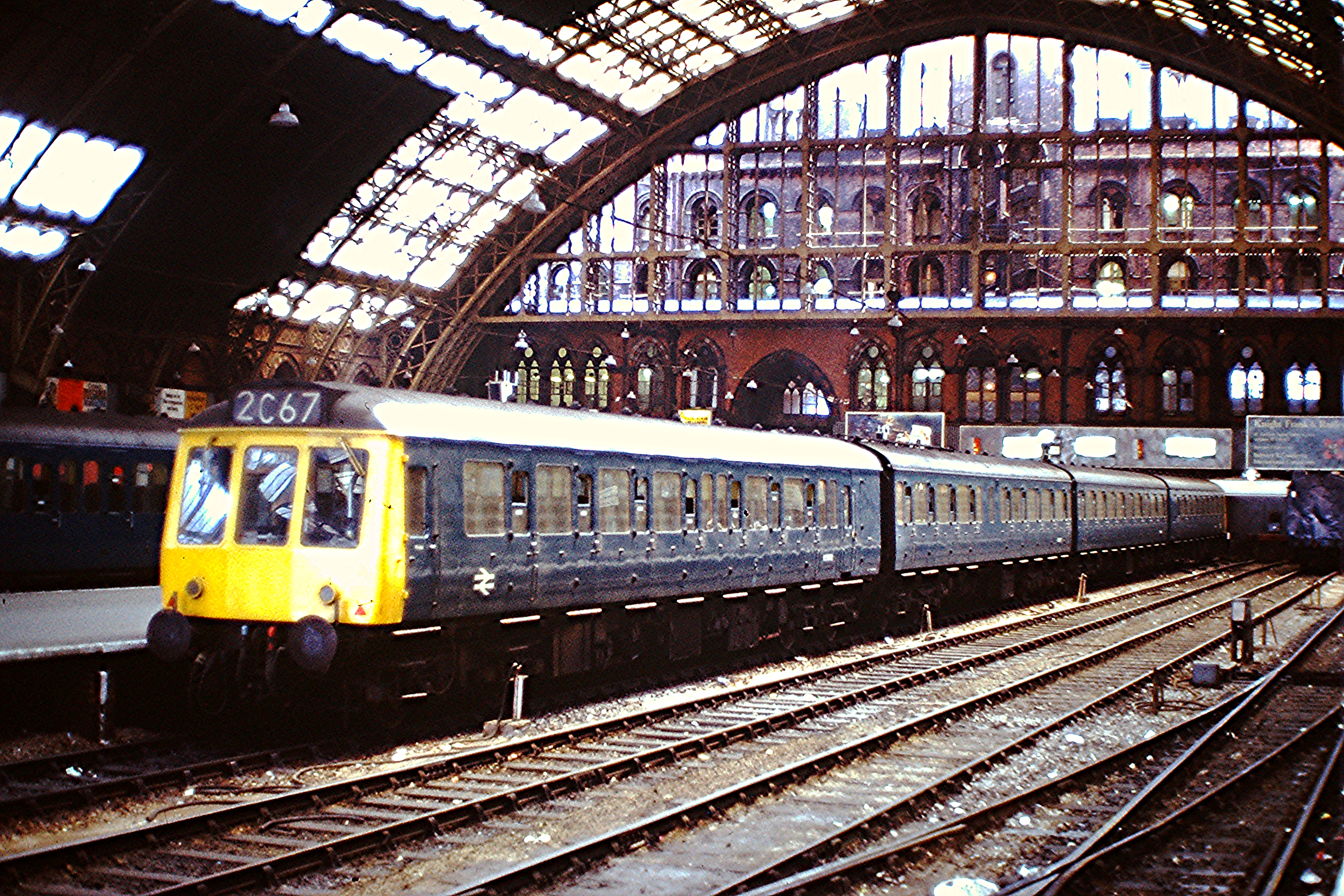
- BR (Derby) Class 127 4-car Suburban DMU at St Pancras, 1975
- In service: 1959–1993
- Manufacturer: BR Derby
- Built at: Derby
- Family name: First generation
- Replaced: Steam locomotives and carriages
- Constructed: 1958–1959
- Number built: 30 sets (120 vehicles)
- Number preserved: 3 sets (8 vehicles)
- Number scrapped: 27 sets (112 vehicles)
- Successor: Class 317
- Formation: 4-cars sets: DMBS + TSL + TS + DMBS
- Fleet numbers: 51591–51650 (DMBS); 59589–59618 (TSL); 59619–59648 (TS)
- Capacity: DMBS: 78; TSL: 90 (2 lavatories); TS: 106
- Operator: British Rail

Specifications
- Car length: 64 ft 0 in (19.51 m)
- Width: 9 ft 3 in (2.82 m)
- Height: 12 ft 4 1/2 in (3.772 m)
- Maximum speed: 70 mph (113 km/h)
- Weight: DMS: 40 long tons (41 t; 45 short tons); TSL: 30 long tons (30 t; 34 short tons); TS: 29 long tons (29 t; 32 short tons)
- Prime movers: Rolls-Royce C8NFLH, 2 per power car
- Power output: 476 hp (355 kW) per power car
- Transmission: Hydraulic
- Multiple working: ■ Originally Blue Square but later changed to ▲Red Triangle
- Track gauge: 4 ft 8 1/2 in (1,435 mm)

The British Rail Class 127 diesel multiple units were built by BR Derby in 1959. Thirty 4-car units were built, formed of two outer driving motor vehicles, sandwiching two intermediate trailers which were classified class 186.

== Replacement ==
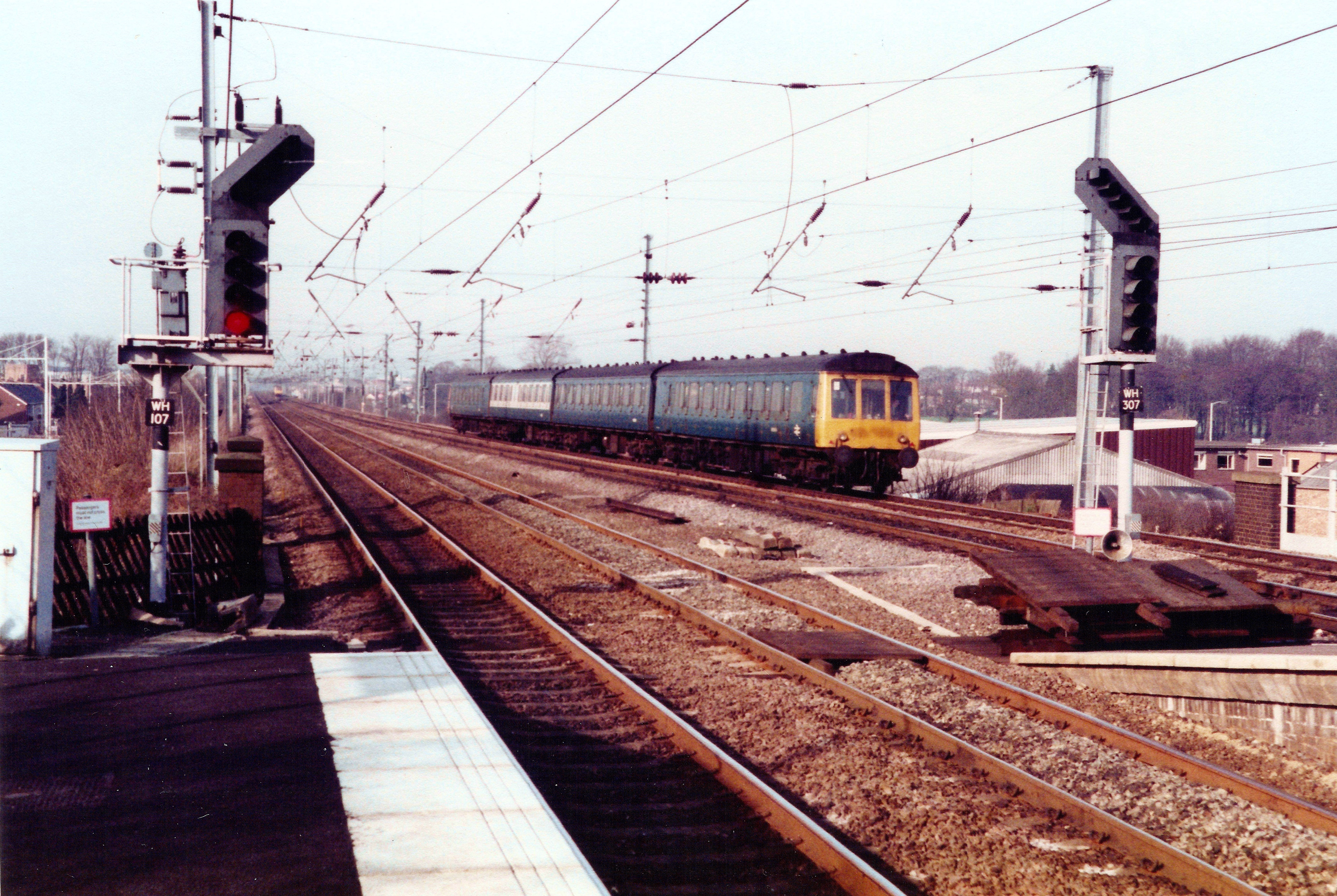
A diesel powered class 127 operating under the wires in 1983.

The class 127 units operated one of the most intensive passenger services worked by diesel multiple units and, by the late 1970s, it was clear they needed replacing. It was therefore decided to electrify the Bedford line and replace the Class 127 units with new Class 317 electric multiple units. The class 127 units should have been withdrawn by 1982, however, delays with the new trains meant they had to struggle on in service until July 1983. This was largely due to an industrial dispute with the unions over Driver only operation, which resulted in the new electric trains being stored at Cricklewood depot for nearly a year, awaiting the resolution of the dispute.

== Accidents and incidents ==
- On 10 October 1964, on an eight-car London St Pancras to Bedford service, a cardan shaft failed on rear car 51591 near Wilshamstead. The failed shaft pierced two fuel tanks, which then caught fire. One person was killed and four injured by jumping from the train. The fire caused only minor damage and was brought under control by the train crew and a railwayman passenger.

== Preservation ==
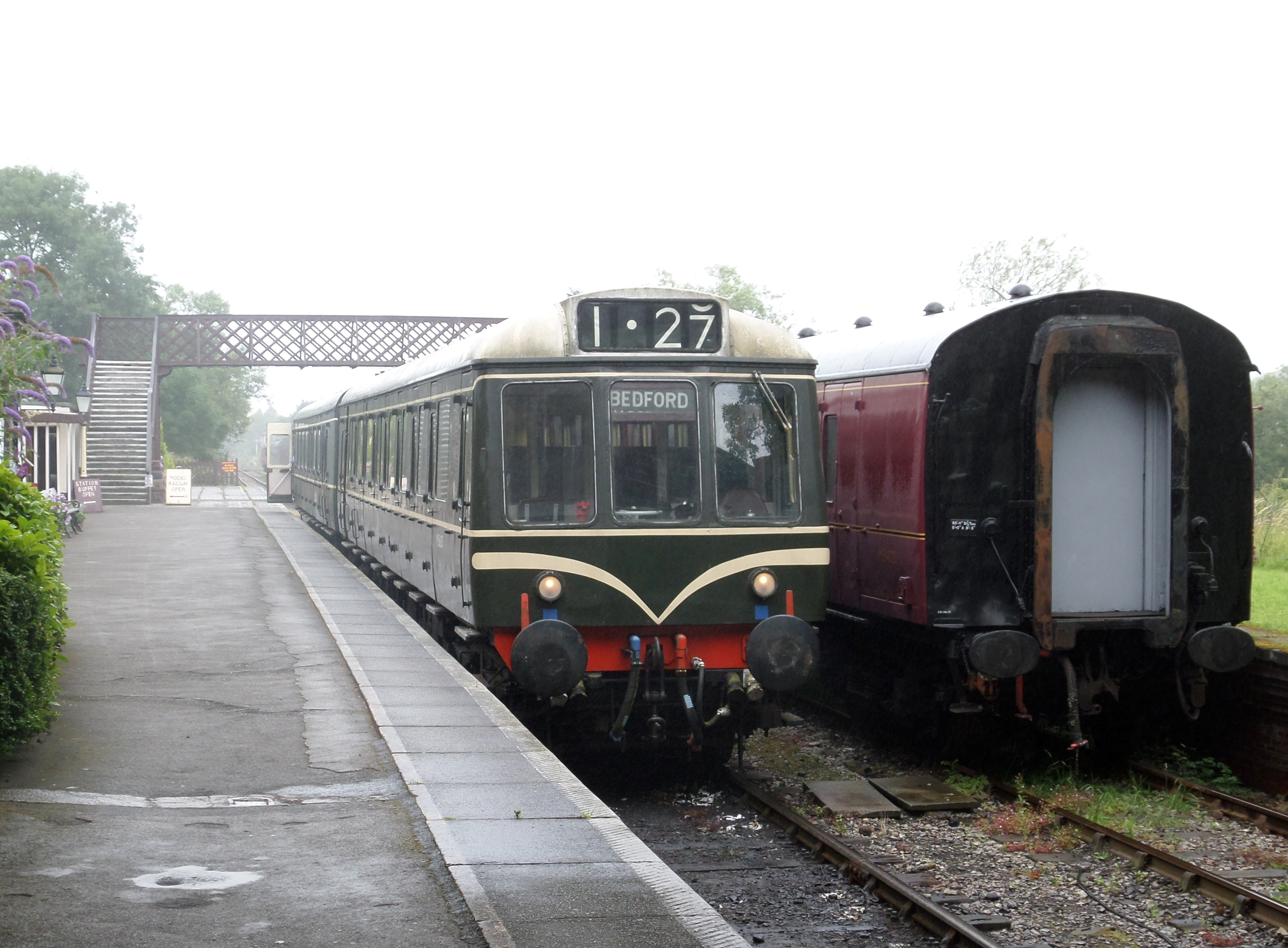
A Class 127 at the Midland Railway Centre, Butterley.

Vehicles Numbers			Livery	Location	Comments
51616	-	-	BR Green	Helston Railway	
51622	-	-	BR Green	Helston Railway	
