= British Rail Classes 112 and 113 =

British diesel multiple unit train, 1960-1969

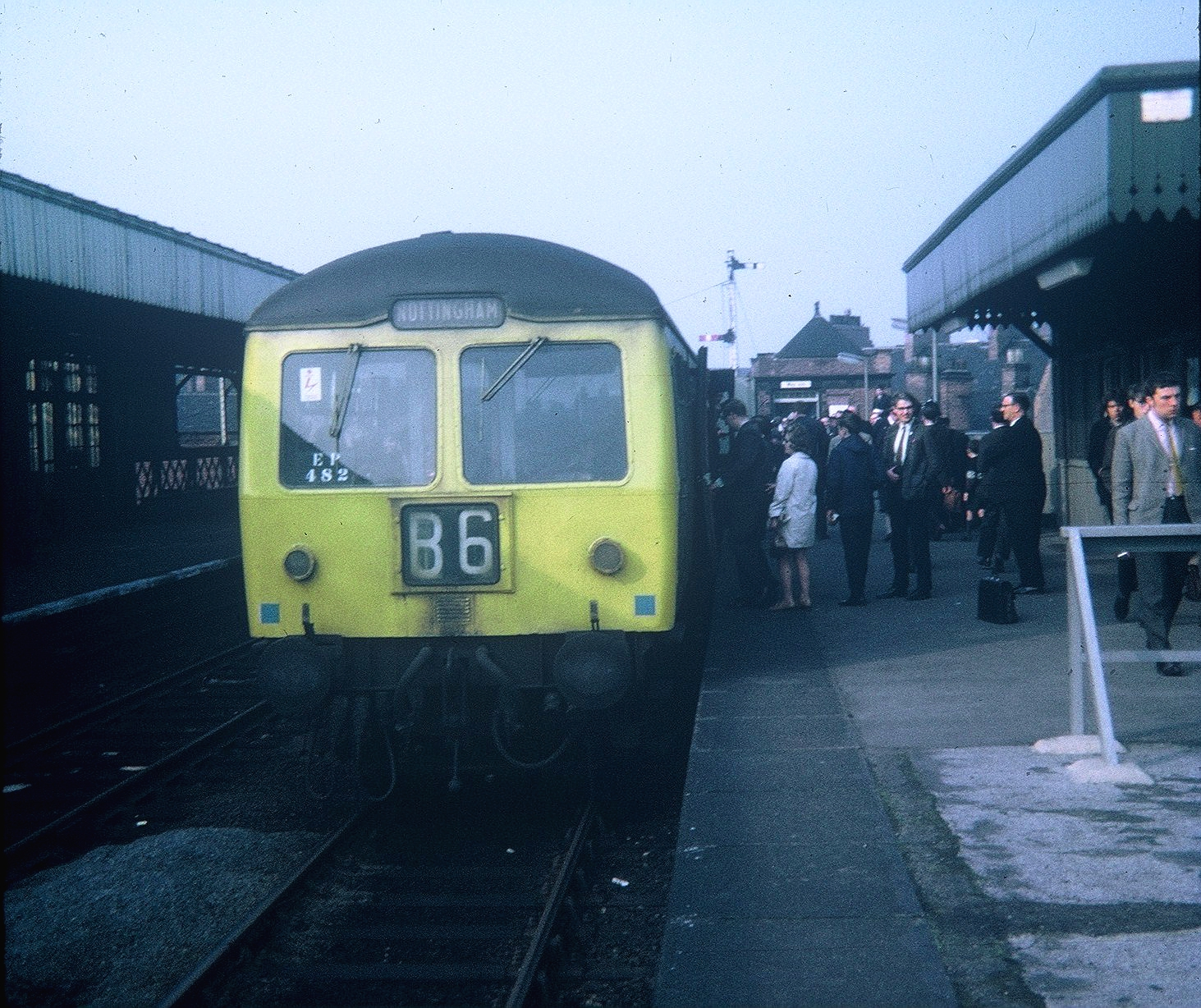
- Last train from Nottingham Arkwright Street, 1969
- In service: 1960–1969
- Manufacturer: Cravens
- Family name: First generation
- Replaced: Steam locomotives and carriages
- Constructed: 1959–1960
- Scrapped: 1968–1969
- Number built: Class 112: 25 sets (50 cars); Class 113: 25 sets (50 cars)
- Formation: Power-twin: DMBS-DMCL
- Capacity: DMBS: 52 second DMCL: 12 first, 51 second
- Operator: British Rail
- Line served: London Midland Region

Specifications
- Car body construction: Steel
- Car length: 57 ft 6 in (17.53 m)
- Width: 9 ft 3 in (2.82 m)
- Doors: Slam
- Maximum speed: 70 mph (110 km/h)
- Weight: DMBS: 30 long tons 0 cwt (67,200 lb or 30.5 t), DMCL: 30 long tons 0 cwt (67,200 lb or 30.5 t)
- Prime mover: One Rolls-Royce C8NFLH
- Power output: 238 hp (177 kW) per car
- Transmission: Class 112: Mechanical 4-speed epicyclic gearbox Class 113: Hydraulic
- UIC classification: (1A)(A1)+(1A)(A1)
- Braking system: Vacuum
- Coupling system: Screw-link
- Multiple working: ■ Blue Square
- Track gauge: 4 ft 8 1/2 in (1,435 mm)

The Class 112 and Class 113 DMUs used the standard Cravens body used on Class 105s but had a single Rolls-Royce C8NFLH engine rated at 238 hp (177 kW) per car, all of which formed into 'power twins' – two car sets with both vehicles powered.

There were two batches built, the first 50 vehicles (25 sets) had standard mechanical transmission via a gearbox and were allocated the Class 112. The second batch of 50 cars (25 sets) had hydraulic transmissions, and became Class 113s.

The cars were built for services in the LMR Central Division and in the Liverpool - St Helens area, where the gradients in the Lancashire & Yorkshire area required more power. Both types also spent some time working from Cricklewood.

The gross weight of a set with all seats occupied was approximately 70 tons, giving 6.8 hp (5.1 kW) per ton. Empty, it was 8.1 hp/ton, which compared favourably with 5.7 hp/ton that the Cravens power/trailer had.

== Orders ==
Lot No.	Diagram	Car Type	Qty	Fleet numbers	Notes
30533	602	Driving Motor Brake Third (DMBS)	25	51681–51705	Class 112
30534	603	Driving Motor Composite with lavatory (DMCL)	25	51706–51730	Class 112
30535	604	Driving Motor Brake Third (DMBS)	25	51731–51755	Class 113
30536	605	Driving Motor Composite with lavatory (DMCL)	25	51756–51780	Class 113

== Withdrawal ==
The first withdrawal was M51780 in February 1962. Four more cars were withdrawn in 1964 (M51770), 1966 (M51763) and 1967 (M51705, M51724). General withdrawal of class 112 began in November 1968 – 29 cars were withdrawn that month, and was completed in November the following year. General withdrawal of class 113 began in February 1969, and was completed in July the same year. Some were cut up at BR workshops such as Derby and Doncaster, but most were sold to scrap merchants. The last of these were broken up in 1971, although two units survived in industrial use until 1982. None were preserved.

== Further use ==
By 1973, two units were in use by British Steel at Shotton Works on Deeside. They were used as mobile work vans by the permanent way staff and were not self-propelled, having their engines removed. They were last noted on site derelict in September 1982.
