= British Rail Class 104 =

British diesel multiple unit train

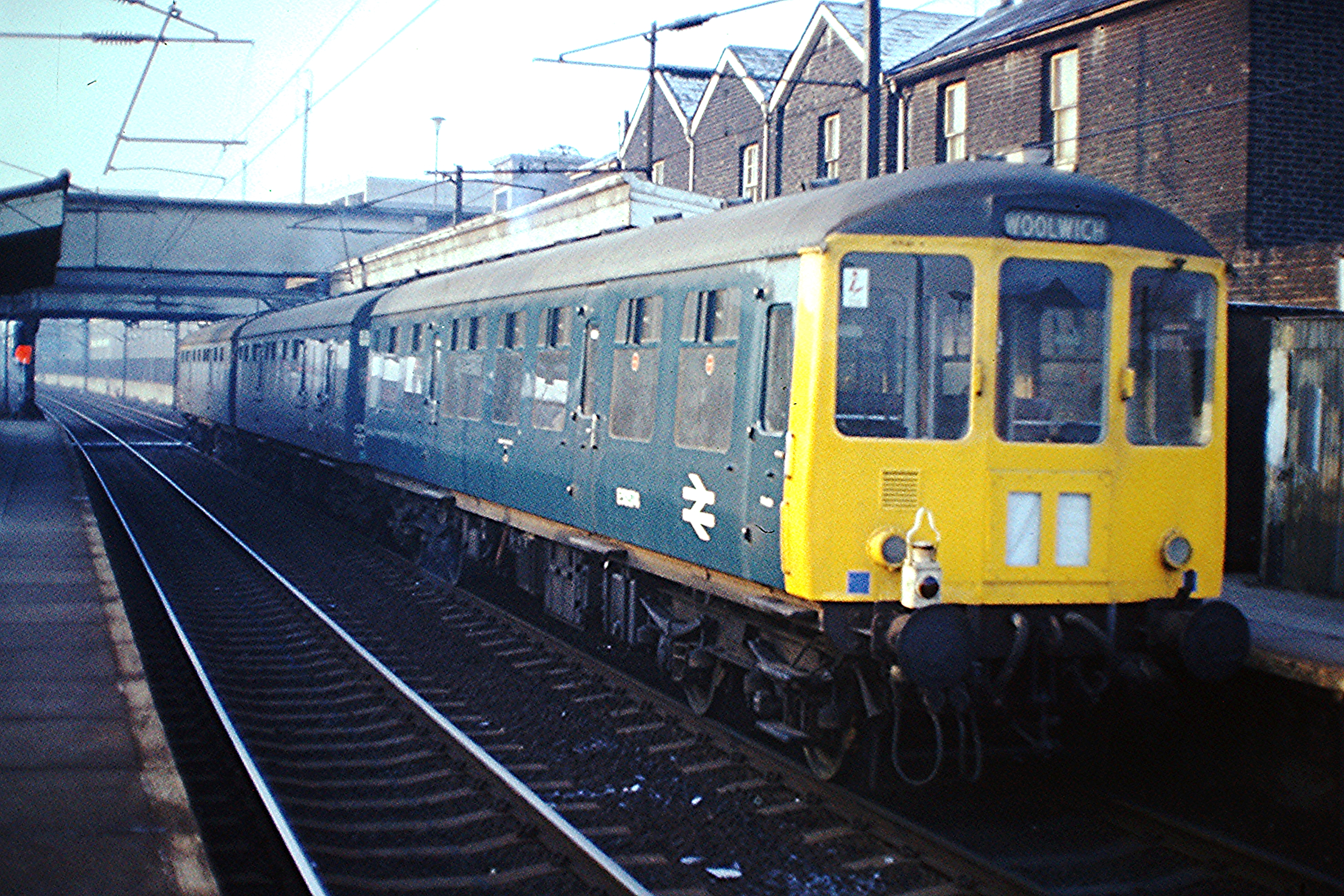
- Class 104 at Tottenham Hale in 1976
- In service: 1957–1993
- Manufacturer: Birmingham Railway Carriage and Wagon Company
- Family name: First generation
- Replaced: Steam locomotives and carriages
- Constructed: 1957–1959
- Number built: 71 DMBS, 108 DMCL, 15 DTCL, 56 TCL, 26 TBSL, 26 TSL. Total: 302 cars
- Number preserved: 13
- Formation: 2 car sets: DMBS-DTCL; 3 car sets: DMBS-TCL-DMCL; 4 cars sets:DMCL-TSL-TBSL-DMCL
- Capacity: DMBS: 52, DMCL/DTCL: 12F 51S, TCL: 12F 54, TBSL: 51, TSL: 69
- Operator: British Rail

Specifications
- Car body construction: Steel
- Car length: 57 ft 6 in (17.53 m)
- Width: 9 ft 3 in (2.82 m)
- Maximum speed: 70 mph (110 km/h)
- Weight: DMCL/DMBS: 31 long tons (31.5 t), TBSL: 25 long tons (25.4 t), DTCL/TCL/TSL: 24 long tons (24.4 t)
- Prime mover: Two B.U.T. (Leyland) 6-cylinder diesels of 150 bhp each
- Power output: 300 bhp (220 kW)
- Transmission: Mechanical: 4 speed epicyclic gearbox
- Braking system: Vacuum
- Safety system: AWS
- Track gauge: 4 ft 8 1/2 in (1,435 mm)

The British Rail Class 104 diesel multiple units were built by Birmingham Railway Carriage and Wagon Company from 1957 to 1959.

A product of British Rail's Modernisation Plan of 1954, the 104s were designed for general branch line and commuter routes. The first units ordered were for the London Midland Region, with the majority of the class for use in North West of England. The Class 110 was a re-engineered version of the 104 with more powerful engines, but did not last as long in service. The 104s had asbestos insulation removed during the 1970s.

== Operations ==
=== Greater Manchester ===
The 104 was introduced on 17 June 1957. The type was seen regularly on services from Manchester to Buxton, Marple, New Mills and Blackpool. The 104 was ideal for these routes as the lightweight chassis were well suited to the hilly lines in the northwest of England. A regular sight in the Greater Manchester area for over 30 years, the 104s were replaced by Sprinters by 1990, with the last running on 4 May 1990.

=== Scotland ===
In early 1984 a few units reallocated to Scotland to replace Class 107s. A fire at Ayr depot had destroyed several trains and the 104s were called in to replace them. One unit was repainted in a unique maroon and white livery for services to Oban – it became known as the "Mexican Bean". The 104s were withdrawn from Scotland in April 1989 and were replaced by Sprinter DMUs.

=== London Region ===
Other vehicles spent time in London and the last vehicles could be found on the Gospel Oak to Barking line. They were withdrawn in 1995.

== Orders ==
Lot numbers, car numbers regional allocation and formation
Lot No.	Car type	Qty	Fleet numbers	Service
30290	Driving Motor Brake Second (DMBS)	4	50420–50423	L.M.R. three car sets
30291	Driving Motor Lavatory Composite (DMCL)	4	50424–50427	L.M.R. three car sets
30292	Trailer Lavatory Composite (TCL)	4	59132–59135	L.M.R. three car sets
30293	Driving Motor Brake Second (DMBS)	52	50428–50479	L.M.R. three car sets
30294	Driving Motor Lavatory Composite (DMCL)	52	50480–50531	L.M.R. three car sets
30295	Trailer Lavatory Composite (TCL)	52	59136–59187	L.M.R. three car sets
30296	Driving Motor Brake Second (DMBS)	10	50532–50541	L.M.R. two car sets
30297	Driving Trailer Lavatory Composite (DTCL)	10	56175–56184	L.M.R. two car sets
30298	Driving Motor Lavatory Composite (DMCL)	42	50542–50583	N.E.R. four car sets (2 per set)
30299	Trailer Second Lavatory (TSL)	21	59188–59208	N.E.R. four car sets
30300	Trailer Brake Second Lavatory (TBSL)	21	59209–59229	N.E.R. four car sets
30301	Driving Motor Lavatory Composite (DMCL)	10	50584–50593	N.E.R. four car sets (2 per set)
30302	Trailer Second Lavatory (TSL)	5	59230–59234	N.E.R. four car sets
30303	Trailer Brake Second Lavatory (TBSL)	5	59240–59244	N.E.R. four car sets
30404	Driving Motor Brake Second (DMBS)	5	50594–50598	N.E.R. two car sets
30405	Driving Trailer Lavatory Composite (DTCL)	5	56185–56189	N.E.R. two car sets

== Accidents and incidents ==
- On 18 January 1986, a Class 104 unit (vehicles 53433 & 53482) suffered a brake failure, ran past three signals at danger and collided with Class 47 locomotive 47 111 near Preston. Forty-four people were injured.

== Departmental Use ==
A number of Class 104s were used following their withdrawal from passenger services.

The last two London Midland DTCL vehicles to survive, M54182 & M54183, were converted in 1987/1988 into loco hauled Sandite cars and renumbered ADB977554/ADB977555 respectively. Used until 1994, M54183 was scrapped in February 1994 while M54182 was stored at Buxton until June 2000 and was saved for preservation.

Other Sandite cars included 53472, 53478 & 53530 which were used in Scotland until April 1989.

Derby RTC, known for their railway testing, used 53475, 53506 & 53422 (renumbered 977342, 977343 & 977344 respectively) as carriage washing test coaches. They also used 53451 & 53529 as part of DMU auto-gear experiments until February 1991.

M54182 was the only vehicle converted for non-passenger use to survive into preservation. In 2008 after several years in storage, the vehicle was restored externally, retaining its departmental condition and run in a demonstration capacity with Class 37 37075 for a gala weekend at the Churnet Valley Railway. It was believed by the organisers to be the first and only time that departmental DMU Sandite operations had been recreated in a heritage setting.

== Preservation ==
13 Class 104 vehicles are preserved, all were owned privately by two individuals. 12 vehicles were preserved in 1992 in a bulk tender from British Rail who at the time were reluctant to sell individual vehicles or sets. The thirteenth was saved in 2000 after protracted storage after departmental use. In 2020 the first one was scrapped (50556) due to its extremely poor condition at the East Lancashire Railway.

Set number	Vehicle numbers			Livery	Location	Notes
Set number	DMBS	TCL	DMCL	Livery	Location	Notes
-	50437	-	50494	NSE/BR Blue	East Lancashire Railway	Stored
-	50447	-	-	BR Green/BR Blue	Llangollen Railway	Stored
-	50454	-	50528	BR Blue	Great Central Railway	Operational
-	50455	-	50517	BR Blue	East Lancashire Railway	Operational
-		-	50531	BR Green	Telford Steam Railway	Stored
-	-	59228(TBSL)		BR Blue	East Lancashire Railway	Stored
-	50479	-	56182(DTCL)	BR Blue/BR Green	North Norfolk Railway	Stored/Under Restoration
-	-	59137	-	BR Green	East Lancashire Railway	Stored Next for restoration

=== East Lancs Railway ===
The East Lancs Railway is now the main location for Class 104 preservation, with a number of vehicles based there. The line is geographically appropriate to the Class, being close to Manchester, and lines that the Class 104's served for most of their lives. During their time at the Churnet Valley Railway a small restoration team returned a 2-car set to service between 1997 & 2004. Between 2005 & 2010 attention turned to the rebuild of unique Trailer Composite Lavatory (TCL) M59137 to strengthen the 2-car set to 3 cars, however limited resources put the restoration on hold. Driving Trailer Composite Lavatory (DTCL) ADB977554 was also cosmetically restored into BR Blue livery in 2008 and performed demonstration sandite trains that year with Class 37 Diesel 37075.

=== Great Central Railway ===
In early 2026, the Great Central Railway took delivery of the 2-car set M50454/M50528, which had formally been located at the Llangollen Railway. Like at Llangollen, this was on a long term hire basis. The unit had been at Llangollen since 1994, and had been regularly in service, however the need for bodywork repairs saw the unit withdrawn in late 2025. The Llangollen group did not feel they had the resources to carry out the repairs necessary, and so the lease was terminated and the set moved to the Great Central.

=== North Norfolk Railway ===
The North Norfolk Railway received DTCL 56182 in February 2015 from the Churnet Valley Railway for restoration back to original condition. It was then joined by 50479 in October 2020 from the Telford Steam Railway for restoration but is currently stored until 56182 is completed. 50479 will receive a rolling restoration, so it can be used to haul 56182 at special events, of body and interior to bring it up to a fully restored condition. Once restoration of both vehicles are complete they will run in a as delivered 2-car power trailer formation.

=== Telford Steam Railway ===
The Telford Steam Railway was home to the remaining four vehicles (also on long-term loan), which arrived between 1999 and 2001 from Oswestry, Crewe and Meadowhall. Between 1999 & 2004 the railway operated a 2-car set formed of M50479/M50531 but it was later downgraded to coaching stock use only and by 2010 only M50479 was used. Then in 2018 M50479 was finally withdraw and stored. The other two vehicles, E59228 & E53556, are in poor condition and have not run in preservation. E53556 left for the East Lanchshire Railway in November 2017 to be scrapped. M50479 left in October 2020 for the North Norfolk Railway after the loan was terminated. It will be restored after M56182. E59228 left in October 2020 for the East Lancashire Railway where it will be stored for the foreseeable future after the loan terminated in 2017.

== Bibliography ==
- Fox, Peter; Webster, Neil (July 1982). Multiple Unit Pocket Book. Sheffield: Platform 5 Publications. ISBN 0-906579-26-0.
- Golding, Brian. A Pictorial Record of British Railways Diesel Multiple Units.
- Haresnape, Brian. British Rail Fleet Survey 8: Diesel Multiple Units – The First Generation.
- Marsden, Colin J. Motive Power Recognition: 3 DMUs.
- Robertson, Kevin. British Railway Pictorial: First Generation DMUs.
- The ABC of British Railways Locomotives combined volume. Shepperton, Surrey: Ian Allan Limited. c. 1990 [1959]. ISBN 0-7110-0726-8.
