= Newton Heath TMD =

Railway maintenance depot in Newton Heath, Manchester

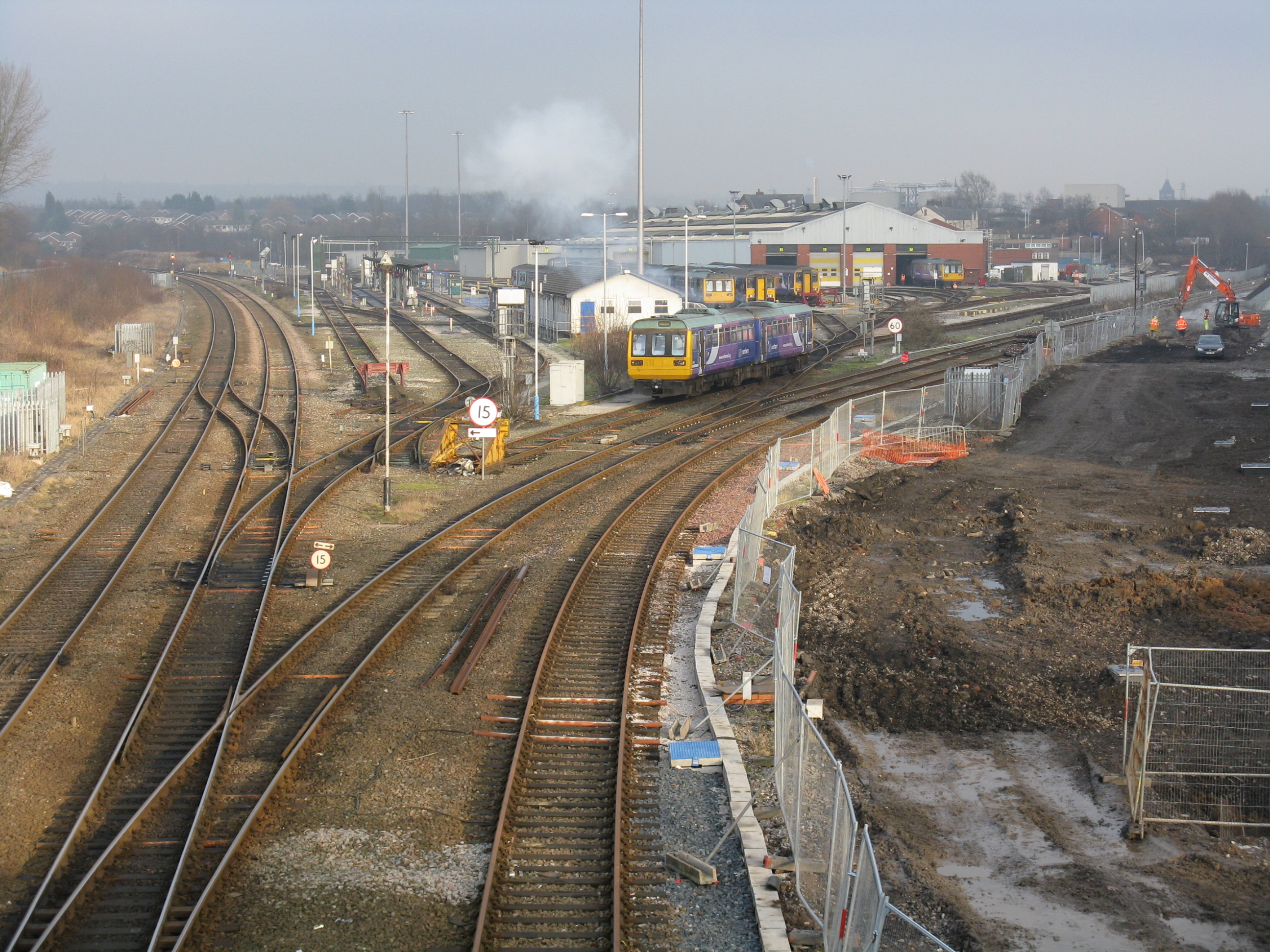
- Newton Heath Traction Maintenance Depot in 2011
- Interactive map of Newton Heath TMD

Location
- Location: Manchester, England
- Coordinates: 53.5044°N 2.1884°W
- OS grid: SD875009

Characteristics
- Owner: Northern Trains
- Depot code: NH (1973-)
- Type: DMU, Diesel
- Roads: 4 through, 3 other

History
- Opened: 1876
- Original: L&YR
- Pre-grouping: LNWR
- Post-grouping: LMS
- BR region: London Midland Region
- Former depot code: 1 (1876-1930); C1 (1930-1935); 26A (1935-1963); 9D (1963-1973)

Newton Heath TMD is a traction maintenance depot in Newton Heath, Manchester, England, at the junction of the Calder Valley Line and the former Oldham Loop Line 2 1/4 mi (3.6 km) east of Manchester Victoria station.

== History ==
The depot was first opened by the Lancashire & Yorkshire Railway in 1876. Two years later in 1878, a football club was formed, known as the Newton Heath LYR Club. The club was renamed Manchester United in 1902.

In 1922, the L&YR was amalgamated with the London & North Western Railway. A year later, the LNWR became part of the London Midland Scottish Railway before being nationalised into British Railways in 1948.

In 1987, the depot's allocation of rolling stock included Classes 101, 104, 108, 142 and 150/2 DMUs. Although, Classes 08, 31, 45 and 47 could also usually be seen at the depot. By 1994, the depot's allocation included Classes 142, 150/1, 150/2, 153 and 156.

== Allocation ==
Northern Trains Class 150, and Class 156 Sprinters and Class 195 Civity trains are allocated here.
