= British Rail regional multiple unit numbering =

Southern Region units are excluded from this page, as they perpetuated the four-digit numbering series commenced by the Southern Railway - see SR Multiple Unit Numbering and Classification.

Prior to the introduction of TOPS, electric multiple unit numbers were allocated by British Rail regions in their own series. Diesel multiple units did not carry unit numbers at first, but the Scottish and Western Regions later adopted their own series for these units, whilst elsewhere individual depots allocated unit numbers, often prefixed by their two-letter TOPS depot code (e.g. TS for Tyseley).

When TOPS numbers were applied to multiple units, the unit numbers were prefixed by the class number to make the new six-digit unit numbers. These regional series have been perpetuated since TOPS because it eases the description of individual units and avoids potential confusion if there is only one unit with a particular identifier working in a certain area.

== Diesel Multiple Units ==
=== London Midland Region ===
There was no regional number series for DMUs: individual depots had their own series, prefixed by their two-letter TOPS depot code. The table below shows the series used by Tyseley depot (in the Western Region until 9 September 1963).

Range	Classes
003-005	Class 128
012-014 / 050-062	Class 122
021-027	Class 114
301-315	Class 117
316-318	Class 118
319-342	Class 116 (Replaced 5xx/6xx Series)
401-421	Class 115
501-545	Class 116 (Non-gangwayed)
600-629	Class 116 (Gangwayed)

=== Scottish Region ===
The table below shows the broad arrangement of numbers, though a couple of Class 104 units took numbers in the 3xx series. Class 107 units were later renumbered twice, first to 7xx following introduction of the Class 156 with 4xx unit numbers in the Regional Railways Sprinter series, and then to 0xx following introduction of the Class 158 with 7xx unit numbers in the same series.

Range	Classes
301-366	Class 101
385-396	Class 116
425-449	Class 107
450-453	Class 104
501-517	Class 120

=== Western Region ===
Unit numbers were prefixed by a letter (letters prior to 1970) to indicate which area (or depot) the unit was allocated to. The table below lists the prefixes used; Tyseley had transferred to the London Midland Region by the time the 1971 changes took place so was not included, though it did shorten its prefix to TS.

Prefix		Area	Depot
Post-1970	1958-1970	Area	Depot
B	BL	Bristol	Bath Road
C	CAT	Cardiff	Cathays
C	CDF	Cardiff	Canton
L	RDG	London	Reading
L	-	London	Old Oak Common
P	LA	Plymouth	Laira
S	-	Swansea	Landore
-	TYS	Birmingham	Tyseley

The unit number ranges used were:

Range	Classes
100-119	Class 122 (Driving Motor 55000-019)
120-135	Class 121 (Driving Motor 55020-035)
200-225	Class 101 (Motor + Trailer Units)
280-289	Class 121 (Driving Trailer 56280-289)
290-299	Class 122 (Driving Trailer 56291-299)
300-395	Class 116
400-450	Class 117
460-480	Class 118
500-560	Class 120 (not headlight fitted)
571-596	Class 119
600-622	Class 120 (fitted with headlight for Central Wales line)
700-709	Class 123
800-874	Class 101 (Power twin and 3-car units)
900-995	Class 108

Before 1970 unit numbers were not generally painted on the ends of the units, but at some depots were carried on boards visible through the driver's cab windows. Also, each depot used its own number range within the overall scheme outlined above, so that there could be (and was) a Bristol-based Cross-Country set BL516 and a Cardiff-based set CDF516 at the same time! Inter-depot transfers meant frequent renumbering of sets, so that in about 1970 the fleet was renumbered into a common Region-wide series and from about 1972 permanent set numbers began to be painted (or applied by transfers) onto the ends of units, beneath the right-hand driver's cab window (as viewed looking directly at the front of the unit).

=== Network SouthEast ===
NSE adopted the former Western Region series, and expanded it to include diesel multiple units used on the former London Midland Region, which took unit numbers in the 7xx series. This included units from classes 101, 104, 108 and 117.

=== Regional Railways ===
Sprinter (Class 15x) units carried the last three digits of their carriage numbers in the 52xxx and 57xxx series. The 6xx series was reserved for the aborted Class 157, and was adopted by refurbished Class 143 601-625 and 101 651-695. Refurbished class 117 and 122 kept their Tyseley 3xx and Laira (Western Region) 1xx unit numbers respectively.

== Electric Multiple Units ==
=== Eastern Region ===
When introduced, Class 306 were numbered 01-92 and Class 307 01s-32s. These numbers were amended as they were converted from 1500 V DC to 25 kV AC operation. Parcels and departmental units in the 99x series have included Classes 308/4, 302/9, 316 and 937.

First Use		Second Use	
Range	Class	Range	Class
001-092	Class 306		
101-132	Class 307	101-121	Class 360/1
133-165	Class 308/1		
201-312	Class 302/0	301-366	Class 321/3
313-321	Class 308/2	301-366	Class 321/3
401-452	Class 305/1		
453-455	Class 308/3		
481-485	Class 322		
501-519	Class 305/2		
601-627	Class 309		
701-799	Class 312		
801-861	Class 315		
990-999	Parcels & Departmental		

=== London Midland Region ===
First Use		Second Use	
Range	Class	Range	Class
001-045	Class 304		
046-095	Class 310/0		
101-113	Class 310/1		
133-189	Class 501		
201-204	Class 312/2	201-243	Class 323
301-348	Class 317/1		
401-448	Class 321/4		

=== Scottish Region ===
First Use		Second Use	
Range	Class	Range	Class
001-091	Class 303	001-040	Class 334
092-110	Class 311		
201-216	Class 314		
250-270	Class 318		
301-322	Class 320		
