= British Rail Classes 101 and 102 =

British diesel multiple unit train

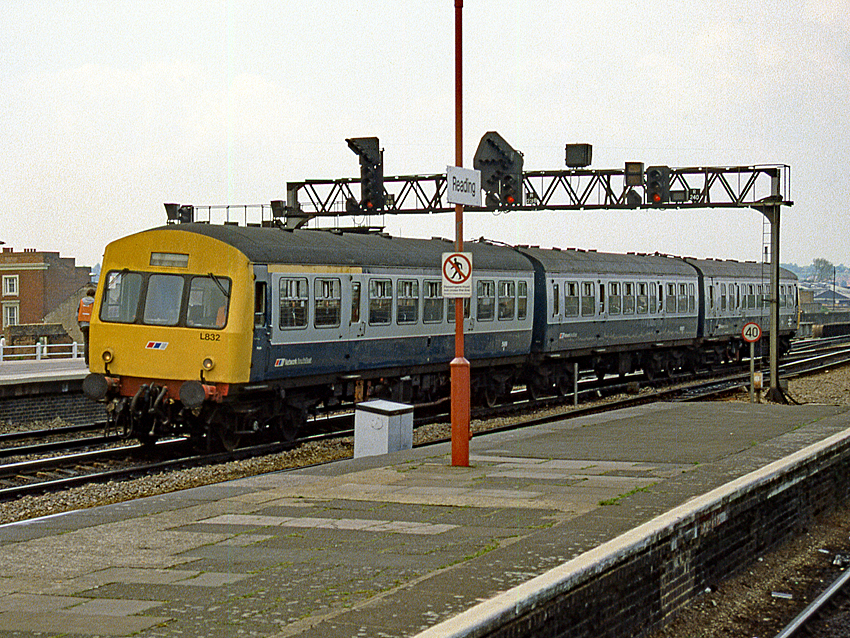
- A Class 101 at Reading in 1989

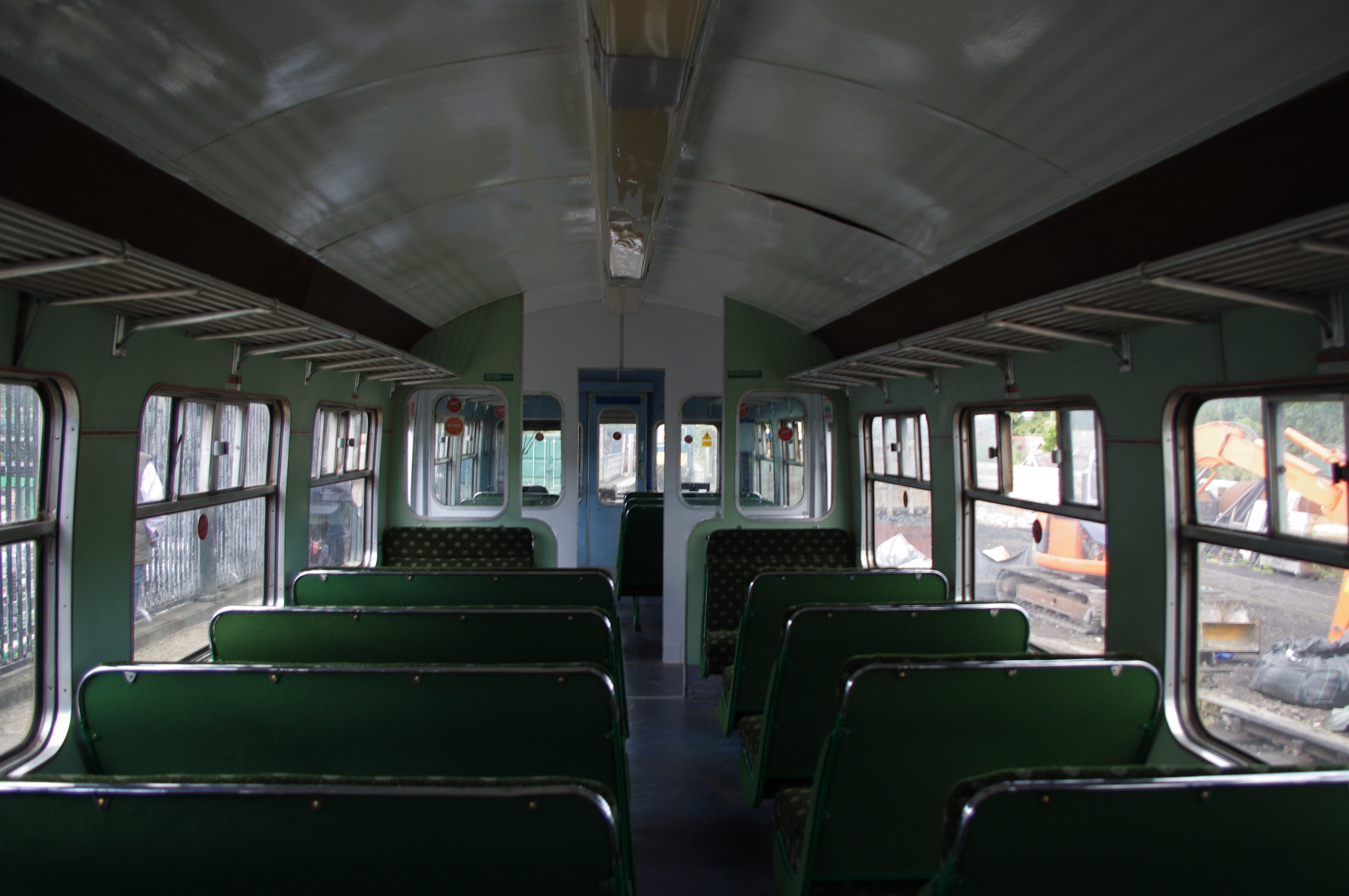
- Interior of 101654
- In service: 1956–2003
- Manufacturer: Metropolitan Cammell
- Order nos.: List: 30467 (DMBS, 51174-51253); 30500 (DMBS, 51425-51470); 30501 (DMCL, 51495-51540); 30587 (DMCL, 51795-51801); 30588 (DMCL, 51802-51808); 30249 (DMCL, 53138-53150); 30252 (DMBS, 53153-53157); 30253 (DMCL, 53158-53163); 30254 (DMBS, 53164-53166); 30255 (DMCL, 53168-53171); 30256 (DMCL, 53172-53197); 30259 (DMBS, 53198-53208); 30261 (DMBS, 53211-53233); 30263 (DMCL, 53234-53245); 30339 (DMBS, 53247-53248); 30266 (DMBS, 53250-53259); 30267 (DMCL, 53260-53269); 30270 (DMBS, 53290-53296); 39275 (DMBS, 53303-53320); 30276 (DMCL, 53321-53338); 30271 (DMCL, 53746-53751); 30260 (DTCL, 54050-54092); 30340 (DTCL, 54218-54220); 30468 (DTCL, 54332-54409); 30250 (TSL, 59042-59048); 30251 (TBSL, 59049-59055); 30257 (TSL, 59060-59072); 30258 (TBSL, 59073-59085); 30264 (TSL, 59086-59091); 30265 (TBSL, 59092-59097); 30269 (TSL, 59101-59107); 30274 (TBSL, 59112-59113); 30277 (TCL, 59114-59130); 30273 (TSL, 59302-59306); 30502 (TCL, 59525-59568); 30510 (TSL, 59569-59571); 30589 (TCL, 59686-59692)
- Family name: First generation
- Replaced: Steam locomotives and carriages
- Constructed: 1956–1960
- Entered service: 1956
- Number built: 620 vehicles (DMCL(AEC engines): 97, DMCL(Leyland engines): 53, DMBS(AEC engines): 164, DMBS(Leyland engines): 53, DTCL: 123, TCL: 71, TSL: 31, TBSL: 28)
- Number preserved: 41 cars
- Formation: 2-, 3-, or 4-car sets
- Operators: British Rail; Network SouthEast; ScotRail; First North Western
- Depots: Ayr; Bristol Bath Road; Buxton; Cambridge; Cardiff Canton; Chester; Crown Point; Derby Etches Park; Eastfield; Haymarket; Heaton; Hull Botanic Gardens; Longsight; Landore; Neville Hill; Old Oak Common; Reading; Tyseley

Specifications
- Car length: 57 ft 0 in (17.37 m)
- Width: 9 ft 3 in (2.82 m)
- Height: 12 ft 4 in (3.76 m)
- Maximum speed: 70 mph (113 km/h)
- Weight: 32.5 tonnes (32.0 long tons; 35.8 short tons) (powered), 25 tonnes (25 long tons; 28 short tons) (unpowered)
- Prime mover: Two BUT (AEC or Leyland) 6-cylinder diesels
- Power output: 150 bhp (112 kW) each engine
- Transmission: Mechanical: 4-speed epicyclic gearbox
- Braking system: Vacuum
- Coupling system: Screw-link couplings, British Standard gangways
- Multiple working: ■ Blue Square
- Track gauge: 4 ft 8 1/2 in (1,435 mm)

The British Rail Classes 101 and 102 diesel-mechanical multiple units were built by Metro-Cammell at Washwood Heath in Birmingham, England, from 1956 to 1959, following construction of a series of prototype units. These classes proved to be some of the most successful and longest-lived of BR's First Generation DMUs, second in longevity only to the Class 121, with the final five units being withdrawn on 24 December 2003. The oldest set was, by then, just over 47 years old.

== Background ==
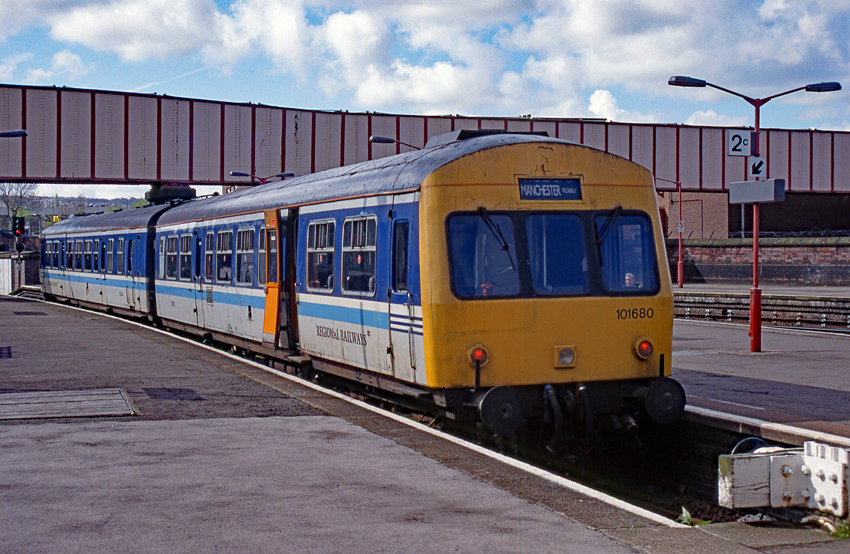
101680 in Regional Railways livery at Sheffield in 1998

In 1955, British Rail published a Modernisation Plan to streamline the railway network, bringing it up to date in comparison to European standards. Steam power would be phased out in favour of diesel powered railcars and locomotives, and projects were put out to tender. BR hoped that by replacing steam with DMUs, costs would be reduced sufficiently to make rural lines viable.

Since there was no time for BR to issue a standard specification, train builders were invited to submit plans on the understanding that the units could be built and put into service quickly. Having gained experience with early lightweight DMUs, Metro Cammell won a contract and put the Class 101 into production. The type featured a steel chassis with an aluminium body to reduce weight. Five orders for batches were placed for the type.

Metro-Cammell advertised their new train highlighting the wide availability and modern features the 101 offered. Demand was so high that at one point four cars per week were rolling off the Washwood Heath production lines. The trains underwent testing on the Sutton Park line near the works from 1956, before the sets were released to BR.

The 101s came in two, three or four car units, with two driving carriages one or two of which were powered by 11.3 litre BUT six cylinder diesel engines with epicyclic gearboxes. Being a first generation DMU, they were a prime example of a slam-door train. They had a top speed of 70 mph (110 km/h).

== Operations ==
In the mid-1970s, the type was chosen for a refurbishment to extend their service life. Vehicle interiors were improved with the fitting of fluorescent lighting, new upholstery and carpeting, and fitting of extra heating equipment. They also had uprated engines fitted. The work was carried out by BR Doncaster.

The Class 111 was a variant of the 101, having more powerful Rolls-Royce engines. They were built to serve Greater Manchester and West Yorkshire PTE. The 111 lasted in service until 1989, fourteen years earlier than the 101.

=== Scotland ===
Class 101s operated various routes in Scotland starting in July 1958. Edinburgh - Dundee was a regular working, with units stabled at Dundee depot.

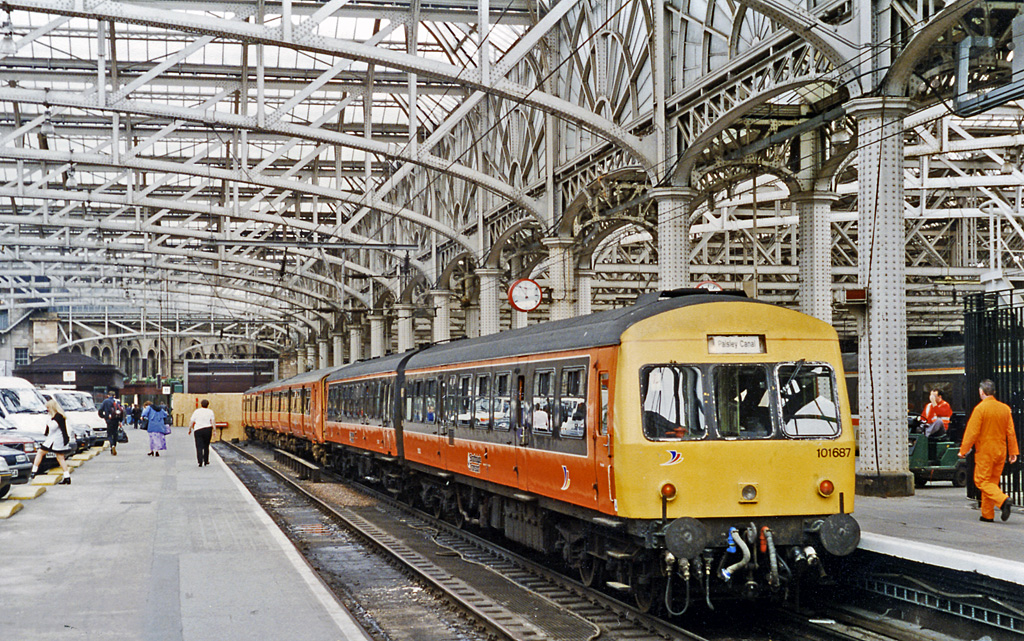
Class 101 in Strathclyde PTE livery at Glasgow Central.

Upon Privatisation in 1997, ScotRail retained eleven units in service, running the Glasgow to Barrhead, East Kilbride, Paisley Canal and Whifflet as well as the Motherwell to Cumbernauld services. Newer Class 170s started a stock cascade and the type's withdrawal began. Upon the 101s final withdrawal from Scotland in November 1999, the remaining sets were returned to Manchester.

=== Wales ===
The type was seen in South Wales working commuter routed around the Valleys and West Wales Line until the early 1990s, and on rural Welsh lines until the early 2000s. In the 1970s, a diagram from Birmingham to Aberystwyth via the Cambrian Line was a regular route for the 101s. From 1982, they were used on the Central Wales Line between Shrewsbury and Swansea. The 101s were scheduled along with a mixture of other first generation DMUs and Sprinters to work the Crewe - Holyhead services from the early 1980s.

=== West Midlands ===
Starting on 14 April 1958, the region received a batch of two and three car units. Class 101s were extensively used for commuter services on the Cross-City Line and Chase Line in Birmingham and services to Worcester before being put to work in outlying areas.

Operating from Tyseley depot, the type was used all over the West Midlands well into the 1980s. Just as with the Class 116 which was also heavily used on the same routes, the 101s were withdrawn from WMPTE service on 12 July 1993 when the Cross-City Line was fully electrified. In all, the 101 served the West Midlands for over 35 years.

=== Teesside ===
Arriving in 1957 at the newly opened Darlington depot, the 101s were initially used on runs between Darlington and Saltburn on the Tees Valley Line. Most of the first batch of 101s ordered were allocated to Darlington. The class continued to serve the line well into the 1980s.

=== Tyneside ===
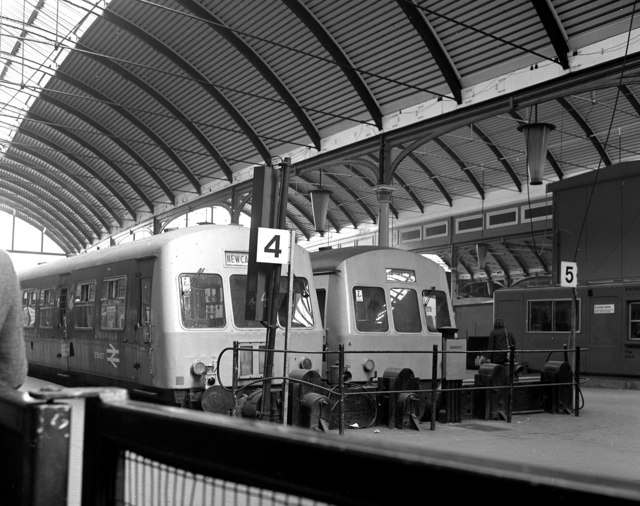
A pair of Class 101s at Newcastle Central

The initial order of 339 vehicles were allocated to the Tyneside area. The 101s first went into service on 24 October 1956 when seven 4-car and 10 2-car units were delivered. A route from Newcastle to Middlesbrough followed. From February 1957, they began operating a stopping service between Newcastle and Carlisle. A longer diagram between Newcastle and Leeds offered a buffet service. The 101's routes were expanded to the whole Tyneside area, replacing the local steam-hauled services. This included the Alston line between Haltwhistle and Alston where the class operated until the line closed in 1976.

=== West and South Yorkshire ===
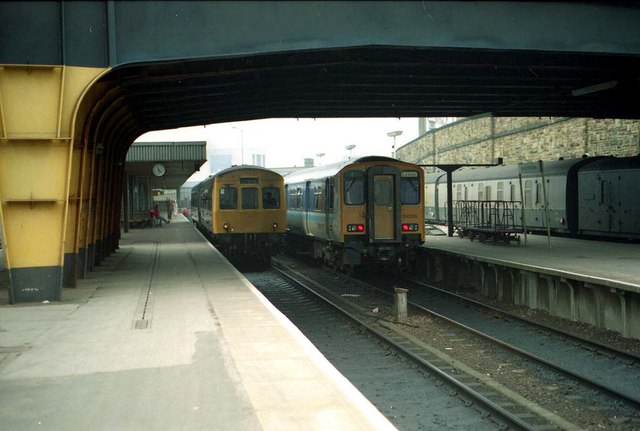
Class 101 at Bradford Interchange alongside a Class 150

An initial batch of 10 units went into service in Bradford in December 1956. Operating out of Neville Hill depot in Leeds, the 101s were used extensively for short commuter services. Because of the relatively underpowered engines, the more powerful Class 111 was paired up with some 101 units, while others were moved to other depots. Occasional services between York - Manchester and beyond were worked via the Calder Valley. Regular services were run between Leeds, Bradford, York and Sheffield but the units could also be seen in places such as Scarborough and Whitby.

=== Western Region ===
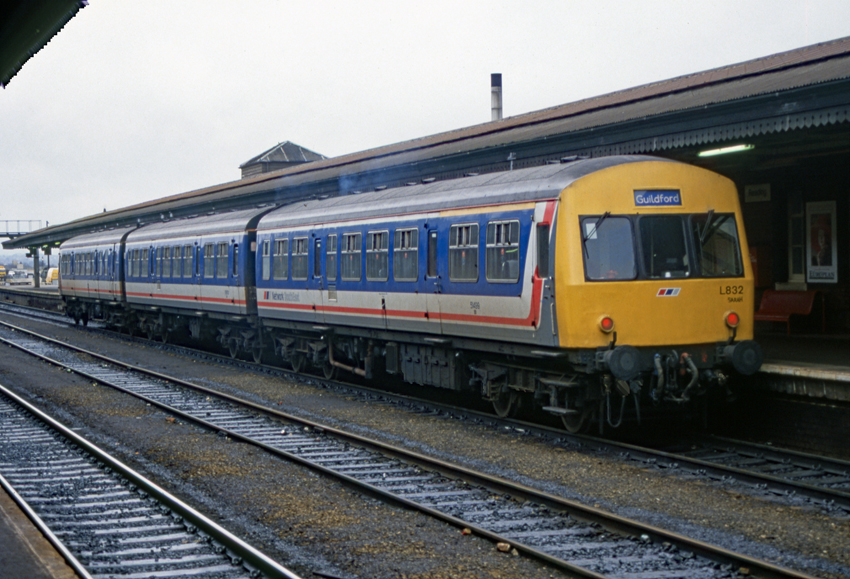
NSE 101 L832 Sarah at Reading on a North Downs line service in 1991

From 1967, several 101 sets were transferred to serve the South West. Services from Reading to Gatwick Airport and Oxford to Paddington were common. Diagrams expanded as more 101s arrived in the region with regular runs in the Bristol area. They were stabled at Reading and Plymouth Laira depots, with the units serving until 1987 when they were largely replaced by Class 108s. Several 101s received Network Southeast branding and by the early 1990s had been scaled back to running local services between Didcot, Oxford and Bicester. However, some 101 units were still working in the Plymouth area as late as May 1993 with the final withdrawal coming in 1996.

=== East Anglia ===
First introduced in the region in January 1970, the 101 units were allocated to Norwich depot and used on rural lines, notably Norwich to Sheringham and on the Fen line, as well as regular services to Ipswich amongst others. In later years, additional units were based at Cambridge. The Cambridge-based trains primarily ran shuttle services from Cambridge to Royston and from Hitchin to Huntingdon. However, with the electrification of the region and introduction of newer rolling stock, by the early 1990s they had fallen out of favour and were re-allocated to other parts of the rail network. The remaining 101 unit was finally withdrawn from Norwich in August 1996.

=== Greater Manchester ===
Despite the intention to phase out the type and other Heritage DMUs in favour of newer stock, the 101 proved to be a dependable workhorse in the Manchester area. Thirty five units were removed from service by 1992 and received a further refurbishment. At this point, they were repainted in Regional Railways livery, and had the class number applied concurrently with several Sprinter and Pacer sets. The work was once again undertaken at Doncaster. Along with other first generation types, corrosion of the body panels and asbestos used during construction was seen as major concerns and were leading causes for their eventual retirement.

Once the units from Scotland had returned, they were put into use working the rural lines around Greater Manchester, especially the Buxton and Hope Valley Lines on services into Manchester Picadilly.

=== Post privatisation ===
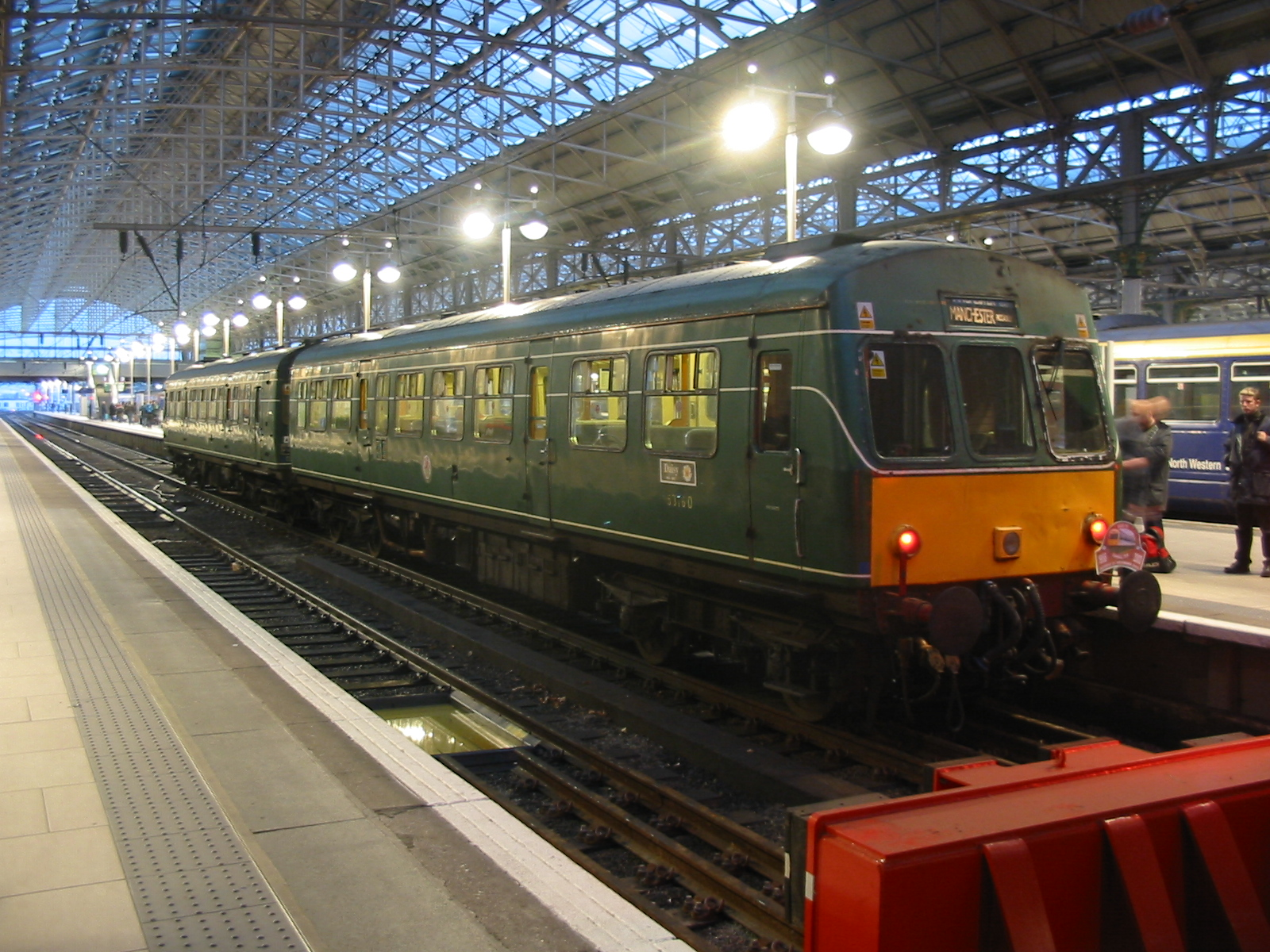
First North Western 101685 at Manchester Piccadilly on 24 December 2003, the last day of service

Following privatisation the remaining 101 sets in mainline service fell under the ownership of Angel Trains and operated by First North Western once the units from Scotland had been returned to Manchester. FNW declined to repaint the trains again, and they retained their former liveries. A total of 18 sets were in service initially. Ongoing problems with the Pacer units and the Sprinters' use on other lines meant that the 101s were called on to continue in service. The 101s outlasted the Class 141 Pacer in service, a type which had been intended to replace the older unit.

The 101 was seen regularly running on the North Wales Coast Line service between Crewe and Holyhead alongside loco hauled trains as late as 1999. The type was unsuited to the route, and was replaced with the Class 175 from 2000. It fell to the 101s to run the stopping service from Manchester to Stoke-on-Trent, along with other rural routes in the north west.

Beginning in late 2000, the age of the units was starting to tell and the remaining 101s were gradually retired. They were used exclusively on the Hope Valley services until the end of their career. The very last scheduled service for the type anywhere was run on 24 December 2003 between Rose Hill and Manchester Piccadilly at which point the final five units were decommissioned from service, and sent to Shoeburyness for storage.

=== Farewell ===
Because of the type's popularity and longevity in service, a final farewell tour for the 101s was run in late 2003 which was a railtour of northwest England.

== Accidents and incidents ==
- On 10 August 1961, Class 45 D105 running light to Neville Hill over-ran signals and collided with a Leeds - Scarborough Class 101 almost opposite Leeds East Signal Box. Leaking diesel caught fire and the leading two DMU vehicles (51440 & 59533) overturned, but were returned to traffic after repair. One person was killed, and two injured. The driver of the locomotive mistakenly accepted the signal that had been cleared for the DMU.
- On 15 June 1965, an empty stock train passed a colour light signal and two ground subsidiary signals at danger before colliding at slow speed with the leading coach of the approaching 15.57 Scarborough - Leeds Class 101. Both drivers and twelve passengers were injured.
- On 11 July 1967, A 101 working on the 10.11 Chester to Manchester Exchange service collided at a speed of approx. 20 mph (32 km/h) with the rear of the 02.00 Margam to Carlisle Class 5 freight train which was standing at the Winwick Junction Down Fast Home signal. There were no injuries.
- On 16 February 1977, an express passenger train hauled by Class 55 locomotive 55 008 collided with a Class 101 diesel multiple unit operating an empty stock train after failing to stop at Darlington. One of the vehicles of the DMU overturned. The guard of the express was slightly injured. The cause of the accident was that the brakes on the carriages of the express had become isolated whilst the train was moving in a freak event. The train had struck an object on the track, which had caused a traction motor cover to come loose. This struck the handle of the brake isolating cock, closing it and thus separating the brakes between the locomotive and train.
- On 28 March 1983, the 20.58 Falkirk Grahamston to Glasgow Queen St. service collided with a van that was allowed to roll away and drop 40 ft (12 m) into the cutting near Eastfield shed.

== Preservation ==
The Class 101 was one of the largest classes of first-generation DMUs and, partly thanks to their relatively late withdrawal from revenue-earning service, numerous vehicles have been preserved on heritage railways, including the Great Central Railway and the North Yorkshire Moors Railway. There are only three centre cars preserved: at the Severn Valley Railway, North Yorkshire Moors Railway and Mid-Norfolk Railway. No Trailer Brake Seconds were preserved.

Set number	Vehicle numbers			Livery	Location	Image	Notes
Set number	DMBS	TCL	DMCL	Livery	Location	Image	Notes
101685	50164	59539	50160	BR Green	North Yorkshire Moors Railway		Last to be withdrawn, operational
960992	-	-	50193	BR Blue and Grey	Great Central Railway		Stored.
-	50203	-	50266	BR Blue	Great Central Railway		Operational
101680	50204	-	51511	BR Green	North Yorkshire Moors Railway		Stored
Iris 2	50222	-	50338	BR Green	Barry Island Railway		Operational
101692	50253	59303 (TSL)	50170	BR Green	Severn Valley Railway		Operational. Moved to the SVR in September 2024.
-	50256	-	56343(DTCL)	BR Blue	Wensleydale Railway		Stored
-	51187	-	51512	BR Green	Cambrian Heritage Railways		Under repair
-	51188	-	51505	BR Blue	Ecclesbourne Valley Railway		Operational (51188 on loan to North Norfolk Railway for 2018/19)
-	51189	-	51803	BR Blue	Keighley and Worth Valley Railway		Operational
-	51192	-	56352(DTCL)	BR Green	North Norfolk Railway		Operational
-	51205	-	56055(DTCL)	BR Green	Cambrian Heritage Railways		Operational
101678	51210	-	50746	BR Blue / BR Blue and Grey	Wensleydale Railway		Last to be withdrawn, under restoration
-	51213	-	56358(DTCL)	BR Blue and Grey / BR Blue	East Anglian Railway Museum		Operational
101695	51226	-	51499	BR Green	Mid Norfolk Railway		Operational
-	51228	-	56062(DTCL)	BR Green	North Norfolk Railway		Operational
960993	51427	59575 (Class 111)	50321	BR Green	Great Central Railway		Operational
L836	51434(DMBC)	59117	51503	BR Blue and Grey	Mid Norfolk Railway		Operational (Currently as 2-car only)
-	-	-	56342(DTCL)	BR Blue and Grey	Great Central Railway		Under restoration
-	-	-	56347(DTCL)	BR Green	Mid Norfolk Railway		Operational
-	-	-	56356(DTCL)	Non Standard Green and Cream	Barry Island Railway		Stored
-	-	-	56408(DTCL)	SR Malachite Green	Lavender Line		Operational
-	50211	-	-	Regional Railways	Private Site		Stored, cab only
-	-	-	50269	Regional Railways	Private Site		Stored, cab only
-	51177	-	-	BR Blue	Private Site, Ashton-under-Lyne, Lancashire		Cab only, used as a store room.

== Model railways ==
Hornby Railways first produced a version of the BR Class 101 in OO gauge in 1958 which was last produced in 1977. Lima also produced a Class 101 for a number of years, in Green, Blue/Grey, Regional Railways and Network Southeast liveries. The tooling was used by Hornby following purchase of their assets. In 2007, Hornby reintroduced the Lima version of the OO gauge Class 101 in BR green and BR blue liveries. Bachmann Industries launched their BR Class 101 in OO gauge in 2014 and this has also been produced in a variety of liveries.

== In fiction ==
The Class 101 DMUs were the basis for the character Daisy the Diesel Railcar in The Railway Series books written by the Rev. W. Awdry, and the adapted television series Thomas the Tank Engine and Friends, although Daisy is a single car. 101685 on the North Yorkshire Moors Railway is named after her.
