= Ayr TMD =

Railway maintenance depot in Ayr, Scotland

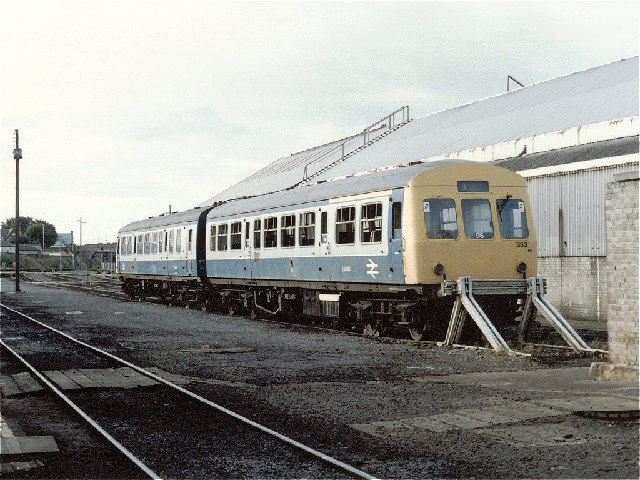
- A Class 101 at Ayr Railway Depot in 1989
- Interactive map of Ayr TMD

Location
- Location: Ayr, Scotland, UK
- Coordinates: 55.4703°N 4.6227°W
- OS grid: NS342227

Characteristics
- Depot code: AY (1973-)
- Type: Diesel, DMU

History
- Closed: 2010
- BR region: Scottish Region
- Former depot code: 67C (1948-1973)

Ayr TMD was a railway traction maintenance depot in Ayr, Scotland. The depot was located to the south of Newton-on-Ayr railway station. The depot code is AY.

== History ==
In 1987 the depot had an allocation of Class 08 shunters and DMU Classes 101, 105 and 107. The depot also had two snowploughs. Other classes usually stabled at the depot included Classes 20, 26, 27, 37 and 47. It was used as a loco and wagon maintenance depot by EWS then DB up till 2010 when the depot closed. It has since been demolished. The site as of 2025 has been bought by Ayr United F.C. and construction has started on a new gym, overflow carpark and training pitch.
