= Coldham Lane Depot =

Railway maintenance depot in Cambridge, Cambridgeshire

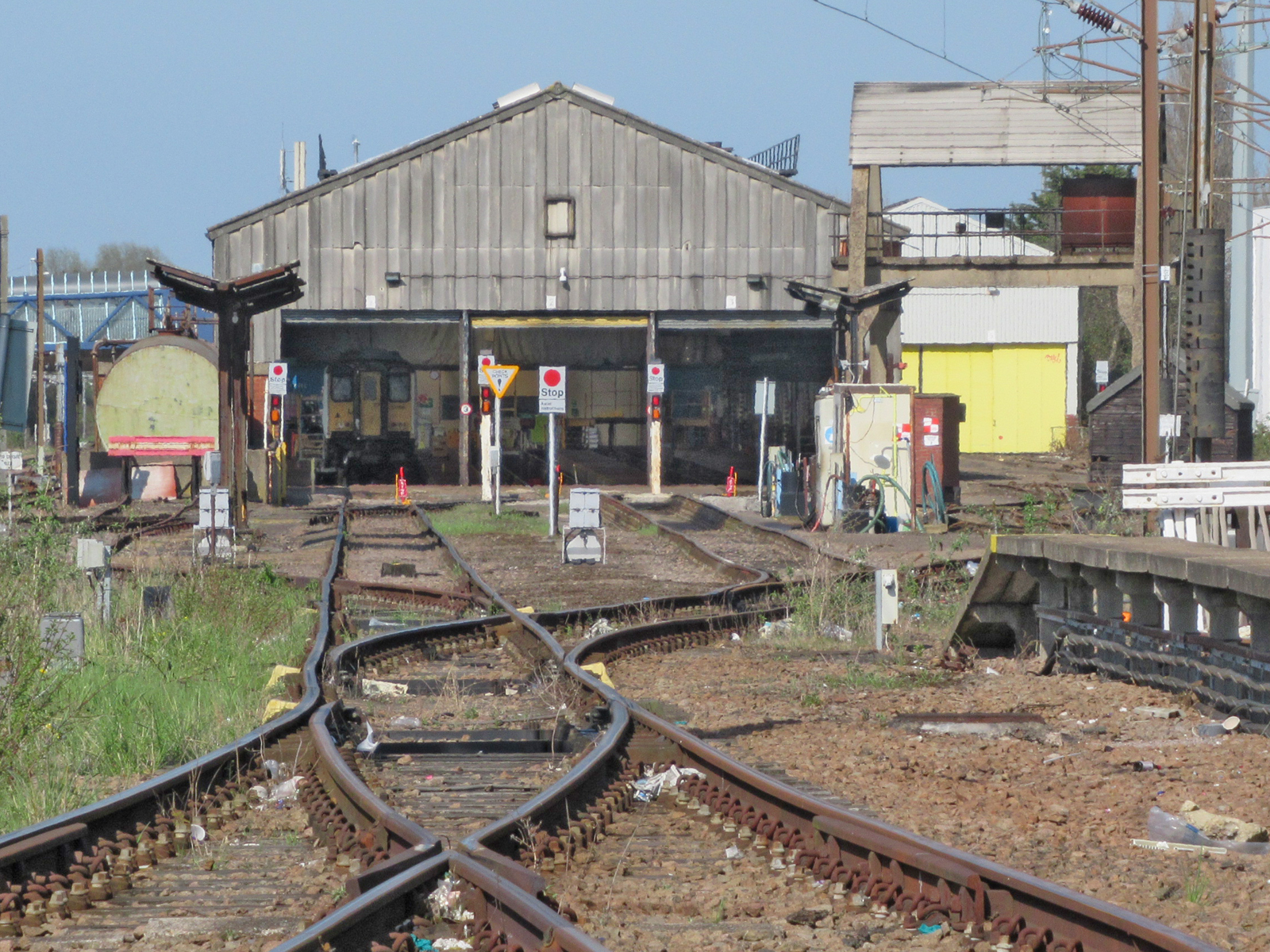
- Looking northwards into the depot from Cambridge carriage sidings
- Interactive map of Coldham Lane Depot

Location
- Location: Cambridge, Cambridgeshire
- Coordinates: 52.2056°N 0.1463°E
- OS grid: TL467585

Characteristics
- Owner: Arriva TrainCare
- Operator: Arriva TrainCare
- Depot code: CA (1973 -)
- Type: DMU

Coldham Lane Depot is a traction maintenance depot located in Cambridge, Cambridgeshire, England. The depot is situated on the eastern side of the Fen Line and is to the north of Cambridge Station.

The depot code was CA.

== History ==
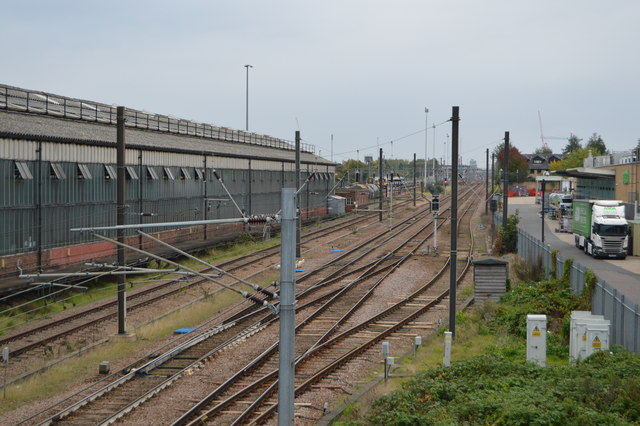
The maintenance shed alongside the Fen Line

The depot is a three-track dead-end shed which was opened by British Rail in 1958, replacing the steam depot adjacent to Cambridge Station which lingered on until closure on 18 June 1962. Up to 1987, when the assignment of rolling stock to the depot ceased, it had an allocation of Class 101, 105, 114 and 120 DMUs. It was also a stabling point for Class 08 shunters. Following the privatisation of British Rail, the depot was used for maintenance purposes by Rail Express Systems (RES) until its temporary closure in 1996, being reopened by Central Trains less than eighteen months later.

The Cambridge University Railway Club adopted number of shunting locomotives down the ages at Coldham Lane Depot. For each locomotive, CURC fitted them with nameplate, "EAGLE _{(CURC)}". In 1996, RES closed down its operations in Coldham Lane, so the loco was going elsewhere. Therefore the CURC presented the nameplate to the retiring depot manager.

== Allocation ==
As of 2016, the depot's allocation consists of CrossCountry Class 170 Turbostar trains.

== See also ==
- List of British Railways shed codes
