= British Rail Class 116 =

Class of 108 diesel multiple units

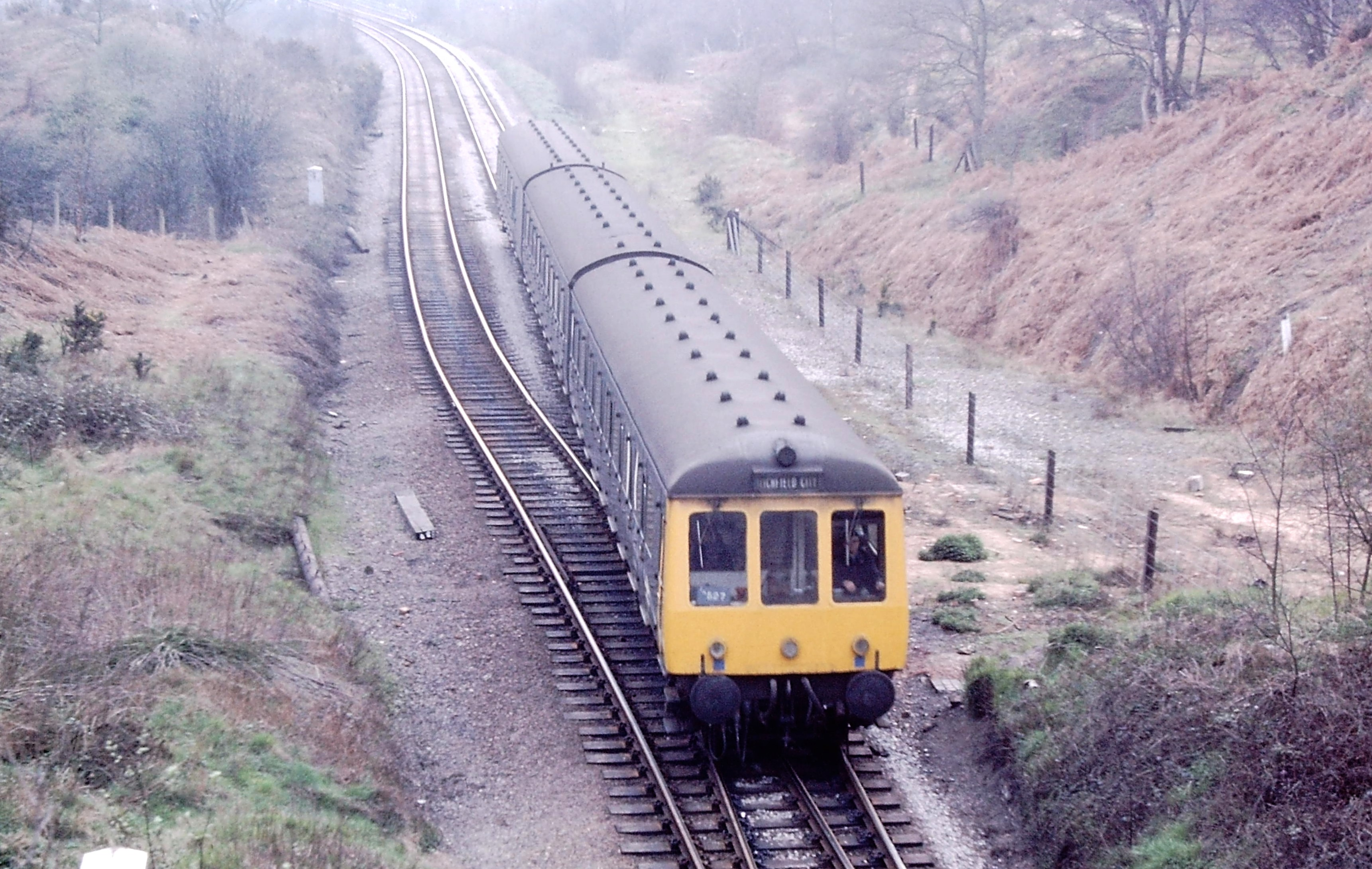
- Class 116 near Kenilworth in 1976

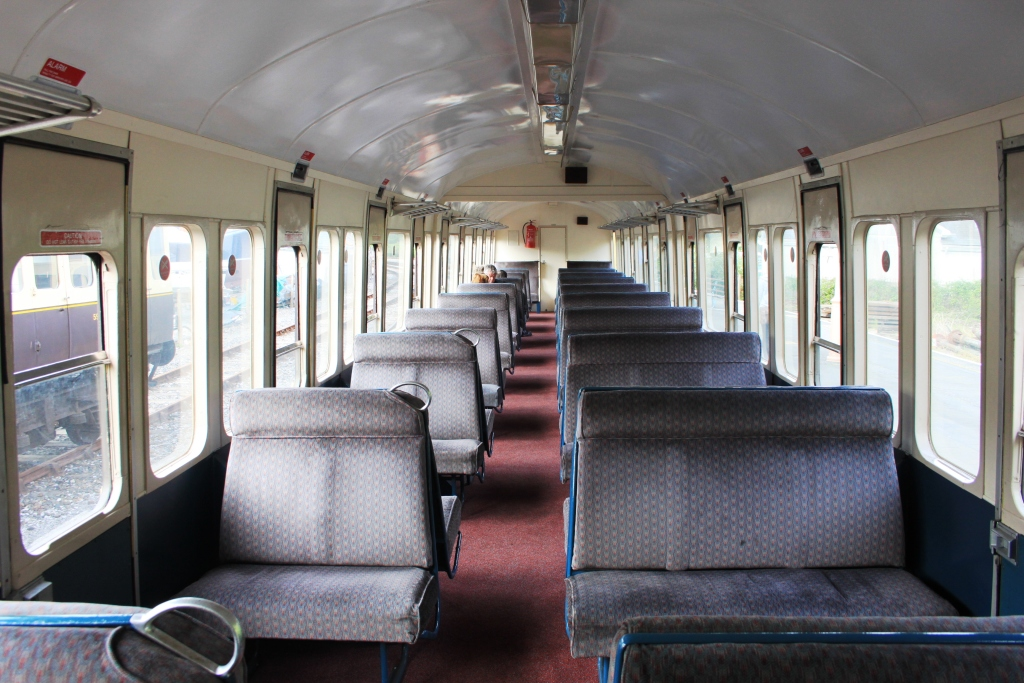
- Interior
- In service: 1957–1995
- Manufacturer: Derby Litchurch Lane Works
- Built at: Derby
- Family name: First generation
- Replaced: Steam locomotives and carriages
- Constructed: 1957–1961
- Number built: DMBS: 108; DMS: 108; TC: 94
- Number preserved: DMBS: 5; TC: 1
- Number scrapped: DMBS: 103; DMS: 108; TC: 93
- Formation: 2 or 3 cars per trainset
- Capacity: DMBS: 85 second; DMS: 95 second; TC: 28 first, 74 second
- Operator: British Rail

Specifications
- Car body construction: Steel
- Car length: 64 ft 0 in (19.51 m)
- Width: 9 ft 3 in (2.82 m)
- Height: 12 ft 4 1/2 in (3.77 m)
- Maximum speed: 70 mph (113 km/h)
- Weight: Power cars: 36 long tons 0 cwt (80,600 lb or 36.6 t), Trailer cars: 28 long tons 10 cwt (63,800 lb or 29 t)
- Prime mover: Two BUT of 150 hp (112 kW) per power car
- Power output: 600 hp (447 kW) per set
- Multiple working: ■ Blue Square
- Track gauge: 4 ft 8 1/2 in (1,435 mm)

The British Rail Class 116 diesel multiple units were built by BR Derby from 1957 to 1961. Introduced as part of the British Railways Modernisation Plan in the mid-1950s, as with other first generation DMUs the 116 was intended to replace steam trains and reduce costs across the rail network. Alongside Metro-Cammell, BR Derby had prior experience with DMUs, having developed a Lightweight Unit, and so was awarded a contract for a new design.

== Background and design ==
BR ordered the type in large numbers but Derby Works could not keep up with demand, with 108 three-car sets being built in all. Variants of the type, British Rail Class 117 and British Rail Class 118, were built by Pressed Steel and the BRC&W respectively under licence. These units were originally ordered for use on suburban and local services in the Birmingham area, but many found their way to other areas such as South Wales.

The type was powered by twin BUT 11.3-litre (2.5 imp gal; 3.0 US gal) six-cylinder diesel engines, each producing 150 bhp (110 kW), with mechanical transmission. The type came in two or three car formations; in a three-car set, the trailer (centre carriage) was unpowered. Built of an all steel construction, the 116 and its variants were classed as heavyweight DMUs but were capable of speeds of 70 mph (110 km/h).

Like other BR Derby output, the type underwent testing on the Ecclesbourne Valley Railway which had been closed to passenger trains by the mid-1950s.

The class were similar in design to the Class 114, sharing the same heavyweight steel chassis but were fitted out as high-density sets, built for short-distance, high-capacity services, and so were built without gangways or toilets, although gangways were later fitted on some units. The Class 117 and 118 types were equipped with toilets however. They were originally capable of accommodating 262 passengers. On introduction, they were heavily marketed based on their appeal to commuters, and offered cheap fares.

Some sources claim that the Class 116 had issues such as poor ride and weak build quality, causing difficulties in later service.

Table of order and numbers
Lot No.	Type	Diagram	Qty	Fleet numbers	Notes
30211	Driving Motor Brake Second (DMBS)	553	42	50050–50091	
30212	Trailer Composite (TC)	555	32	59000–59031	
30213	Driving Motor Second (DMS)	554	42	50092–50133	
30363	Driving Motor Brake Second (DMBS)	553	53	50818–50870	
30364	Driving Motor Second (DMS)	554	53	50871–50923	
30365	Trailer Composite (TC)	555	51	59326–59376	
30385	Trailer Composite (TC)	600	10	59032–59041	
30446	Driving Motor Brake Second (DMBS)	553	13	51128–51140	
30447	Driving Motor Second (DMS)	554	13	51141–51153	
30448	Trailer Composite (TC)	555	11	59438–59448	

== Regular use ==
=== West Midlands ===
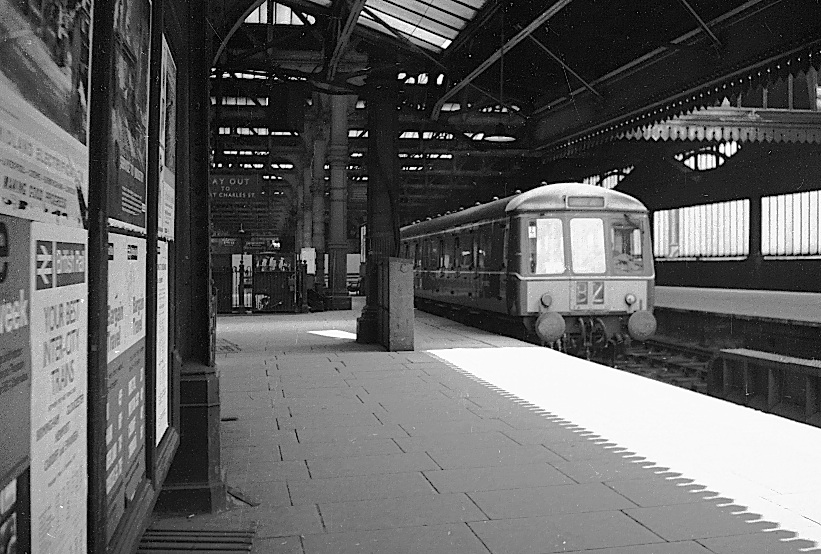
A 116 at Birmingham Snow Hill in 1967

Twenty-nine 116 units (50050–50078, 59000–59028 and 50092–50120) were first introduced into service on 17 June 1957, operating from Birmingham Snow Hill. The 116 was used extensively around the commuter belts of Birmingham before being used on longer routes to Oxford and Worcester from spring, 1958. The type was a familiar sight on the Cross City Line, the Rugby–Birmingham–Stafford line and across the West Midlands for the next thirty years, including services between Leamington Spa and Stratford-upon-Avon. Several units were painted in West Midlands PTE livery.

The 116s were refurbished several times in their lifetime, but with the electrification of the Cross City Line, the type was wound down in the area along with the Class 101, with which it worked in tandem with. Withdrawal started from November 1992 and they were fully replaced by EMUs on 12 July 1993.

From the mid-1960s, surplus units were transferred to the Eastern and Scottish Regions. The first three Class 116 units were transferred to Scotland in October 1966, initially on loan to Hamilton depot, but the move became permanent in November, and by December that year eight units were based at Hamilton.

=== Scotland ===
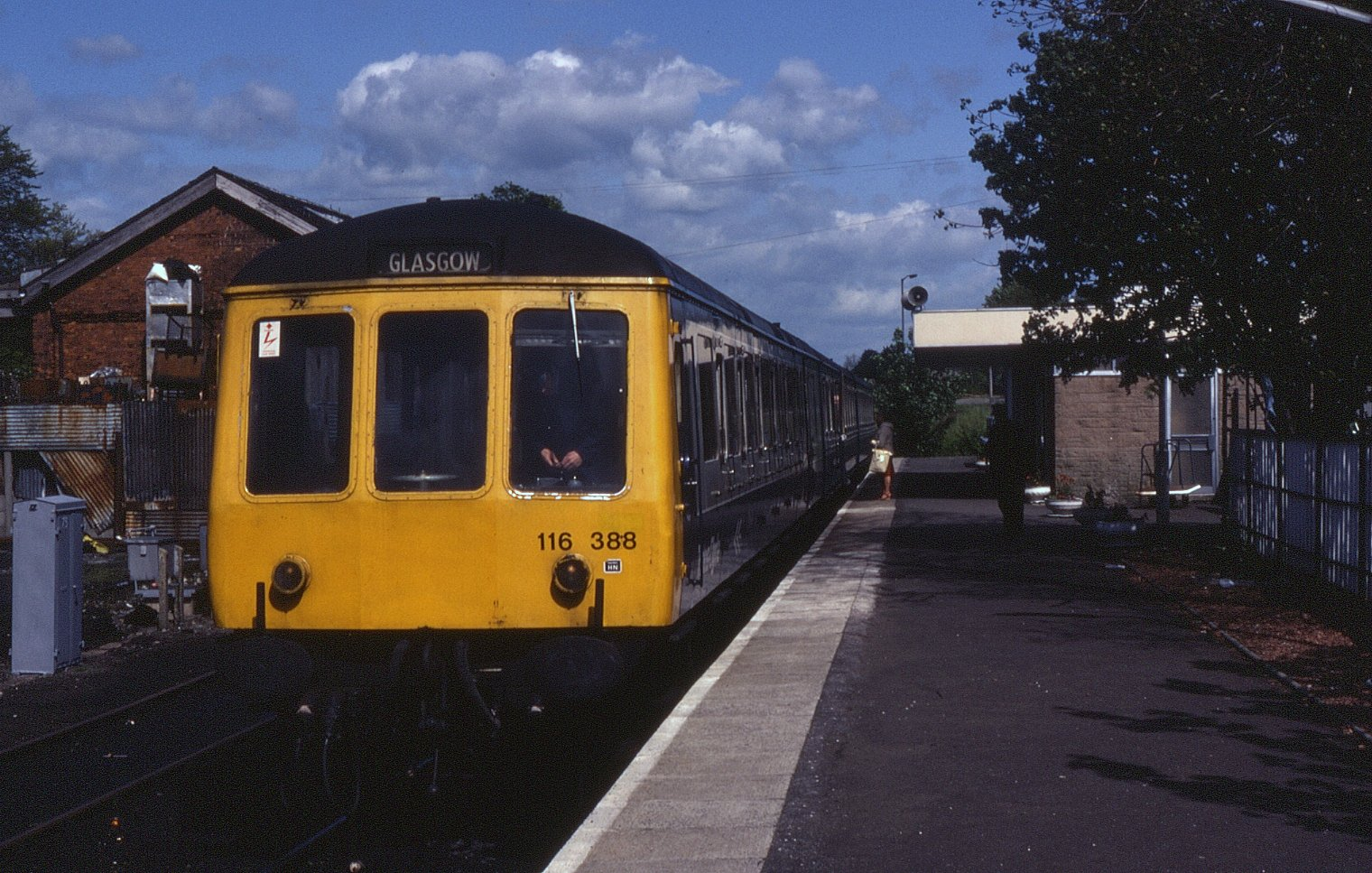
Class 116 running East Kilbride to Glasgow Central service, 1983

The Scottish 116 units were put to work immediately. Initially with eight sets available, they worked out of Glasgow Central to East Kilbride, Barrhead, Kilmarnock, Kilmacolm, sometimes reaching Largs and Edinburgh via Shotts. By July 1972, a total of fourteen sets were in service. The class was repainted in Trans Clyde livery, and were used on longer routes between Glasgow and Ayr.

Hamilton Depot closed in August 1982 and so the class 116 fleet was reallocated to Eastfield. In theory the units were out-based at Corkerhill, continuing to work services out of Glasgow Central. After electrification, the 116's were phased out of use. The last 116 unit left service in Scotland in March 1987, being returned to the Birmingham area in favour of the Class 107, which returned to service after an overhaul of the fleet.

=== South Wales ===
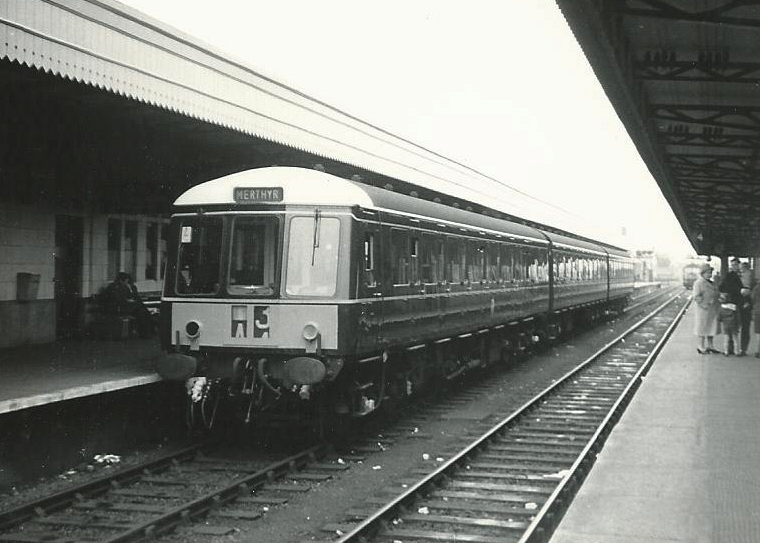
Class 116 running a Cardiff to Merthyr Tydfil service, 1965

The 116 was extensively used in South Wales, being belatedly introduced on 2 December 1957 in the Cardiff Valley region. Originally intended to be introduced in September, a lack of vehicles caused the delay into service. They were housed at Canton depot. Just as in the Birmingham region, the new trains were heavily advertised. The units were used for the next 30 years almost exclusively in the South Wales area, but did occasionally work services to Bristol and Bath.

With the introduction of Sprinters, the 116 became obsolete and were slowly withdrawn from service in favour of British Rail Class 150s starting in 1987. The final 116s were withdrawn from Wales on 18 September 1992.

=== Eastern Region ===
The Eastern region based 116 units were based at Stratford, running services to and from Liverpool Street and Kings Cross. They had been transferred from the Western region with a view to running a Kings Cross – Cambridge all DMU service. A delay in introducing new trains to the London region from the Chiltern area saw the 116 pressed into service to fill the gap.

== Later use ==
The 116 fleet and its variants were extensively refurbished in the late 1970s. The carriages were renovated with new interiors including gangways, improved lighting and improvements to the onboard heating. The work was awarded to BR Swindon. The type was subsequently seen in use everywhere from Tyneside to Devon.

Still in extensive use across the West Midlands during the 1980s, eventually the 116s were joined by brand new Class 150 trains beginning in 1984, with the aim of phasing out the older DMU.

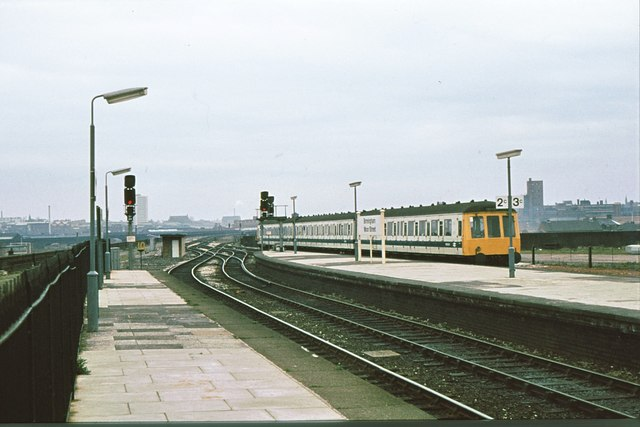
Class 116 wearing WMPTE livery on approach to Birmingham Moor Street

By the early 1990s, the 116 units had aged to the point where hybrid sets were created from available serviceable stock. The 116 had originally been designed for short-distance commuter services, so did not have a toilet. Hybrid sets usually had a toilet to overcome this problem. They stayed in regular service until 1990, when they began to be withdrawn from traffic along with other first generation types. The age of the trains along with concerns about corrosion and the asbestos used during the initial building and subsequent renovations were the reasons given.

They were gradually replaced on regional services by the new "Sprinter" derivative units, or by Class 323 electric multiple units on services around Birmingham, with several units still being used until the final day of diesel running before electrification. The remaining units in use were transferred to Tyseley depot to partially replace the retired British Rail Class 114 and their workings in Lincolnshire.

The final units lasted in traffic until around June 1995. However, a few saw further use in departmental service, as sandite or route-learner units. Several of this class have been saved for preservation.

== Accidents and incidents ==
- On 16 November 1960, W50083/W59033/W50125 was operating a journey from Neath to Treherbert when the leading car, W50125, was struck by a runaway coal train headed by ex-GWR pannier tank 9737, on the single line track at Pontrhydyfen Junction. The driver was killed.
- On 11 June 1974, Set 152 was involved in a fatal accident at Pollokshield East when it was in collision with Class 311 EMU no 108. The cab end of SC50874 was severely damaged, and was never repaired, with the vehicle officially withdrawn 16/2/76.
- In early hours of 3 August 1983, Set 116391 was being returned from a Works visit, conveyed on the rear of a parcels train from London, when it derailed and caught fire at Portobello on the East Coast Main Line. As the vehicles were asbestos contaminated the unit was withdrawn in October 1983 and eventually disposed of by burial in Paterson's Tip, Mount Vernon in July 1984.

== Pacer substitution ==
Several units were allocated to Heaton TMD in the late 1980s to carry out Pacer replacement services during the latter's troubled introduction period. During this time, the individual cars were often mixed into hybrid sets with, for example, class 119 vehicles. Services worked included Bishop Auckland to Saltburn.

== Parcels use ==
Three units were converted to carry parcels traffic and reclassified as Class 130, though the individual coaches were not renumbered. The units involved were:

- 50819 + 50872
- 50862 + 50915
- 51137 + 51150
- W50915 reverted to standard Class 116 configuration in 1977 and transferred to Tyseley

To provide extra capacity, they worked with modified General Utility Vans (GUV) as centre trailers.

== Preservation ==
Five vehicles have been preserved on heritage railways.

Vehicles Numbers			Set Number	Location	Comments
DMBS	TC	DMS	Set Number	Location	Comments
51131	-	-	T326	Battlefield Railway	
51138	-	51151	T333	Great Central Railway Nottingham	51138 was used as a sandite vehicle after retirement from normal service.
-	59003	-	-	Paignton and Dartmouth Steam Railway	
-	59004	-	-	Paignton and Dartmouth Steam Railway	
-	59444	-	-	Chasewater Railway	

=== Preserved then scrapped ===
In addition, the following vehicles were previously preserved at the Swansea Vale Railway, but were scrapped in 2009 due to an arson attack.

- DMBS 51134/5
- DMS 51147/8
- TC 59445
