= British Rail Class 114 =

Class of 49 two-car diesel multiple units built by Derby C&W Works

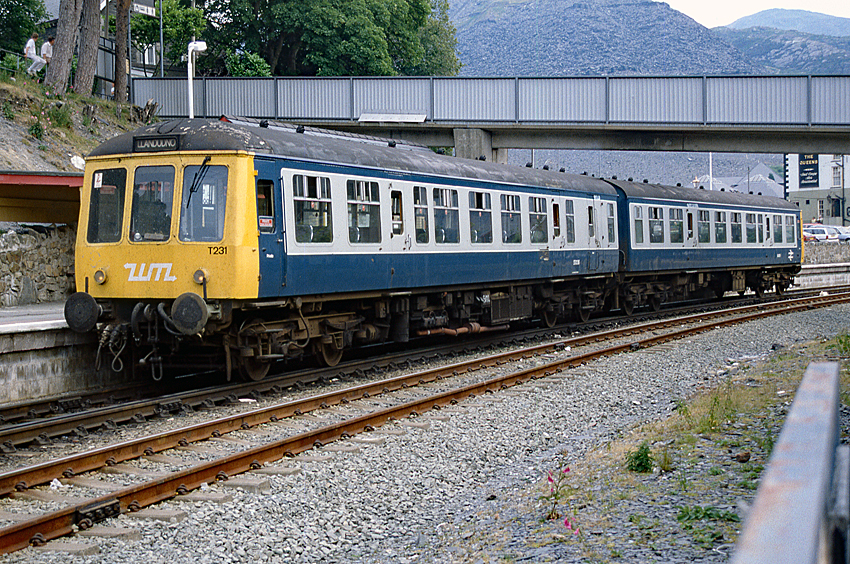
- 114 T231 at Blaenau Ffestiniog in BR blue and grey
- In service: 1957–2002
- Manufacturer: BR Derby
- Family name: First generation
- Replaced: Steam locomotives and carriages
- Constructed: 1956–1957
- Number built: 50 sets (100 cars)
- Number preserved: 2 sets (4 cars)
- Formation: DMBS+DTCL
- Capacity: DMBS: 62 second; DTCL: 12 first, 62 second
- Operator: British Rail

Specifications
- Car body construction: Steel
- Car length: 64 ft 6 in (19.66 m)
- Width: 9 ft 3 in (2.82 m)
- Height: 12 ft 4 1/2 in (3.77 m)
- Maximum speed: 70 mph (113 km/h)
- Multiple working: ■ Blue Square
- Track gauge: 4 ft 8 1/2 in (1,435 mm)

The British Rail Class 114 diesel multiple units were built by BR Derby from September 1956 to July 1957. Forty-nine 2-car units were built, numbered E50001-49 for driving motors (later renumbered 53001-49) and E56001-49 for driving trailers (later renumbered 54001-49). The units were used in the early days out of 40A Lincoln TMD (LN) on services all over the county, although a small number were transferred to 41A Sheffield (Darnall) during 1959/60.

The vehicles were the first type to be built at Derby with the longer 63 ft 6 in underframe, and the first Derby vehicles to be built from steel. This design would be re-used in the 116 and 117. The type was classed a heavyweight unit; with their original 150 hp (110 kW) BUT engines, they were found to be underpowered for the local scheduled services, and lost time especially when towing a van (which was a regular occurrence in that area). The most problematic stretch was the 1 in 122 for just under a mile near Ancaster which reduced these units to 45 mph (72 km/h) even on full power. As a result of this, several 3-car formations were put together using two power cars and one trailer. The type was re-engined with Leyland Albion 230 bhp (170 kW) motors.

These were used in the main on Grantham - Boston/Skegness and Lincoln - Cleethorpes workings during 1957, and would be a familiar sight in the Lincolnshire area until the early 1990s.

== Formations ==
Formations noted in Railway Observer magazine were E50008/E50007/E56007, E50011/E50012/E56012, E50038/E50039/E56015 and E50015/E50035/E56035. Spare trailers were stored at various locations - E56016/25/40 at Blankney & Metheringham, E56010/39 at Bardney and E56004/20/22/37/38/44/45 near Sleaford South Junction.

E50029/30/31/32/33/34 and their respective trailers were transferred to Stratford between February and April 1957 in exchange for Derby 2-car lightweight units, but between June and October the 114s moved back to Lincoln.

== History ==
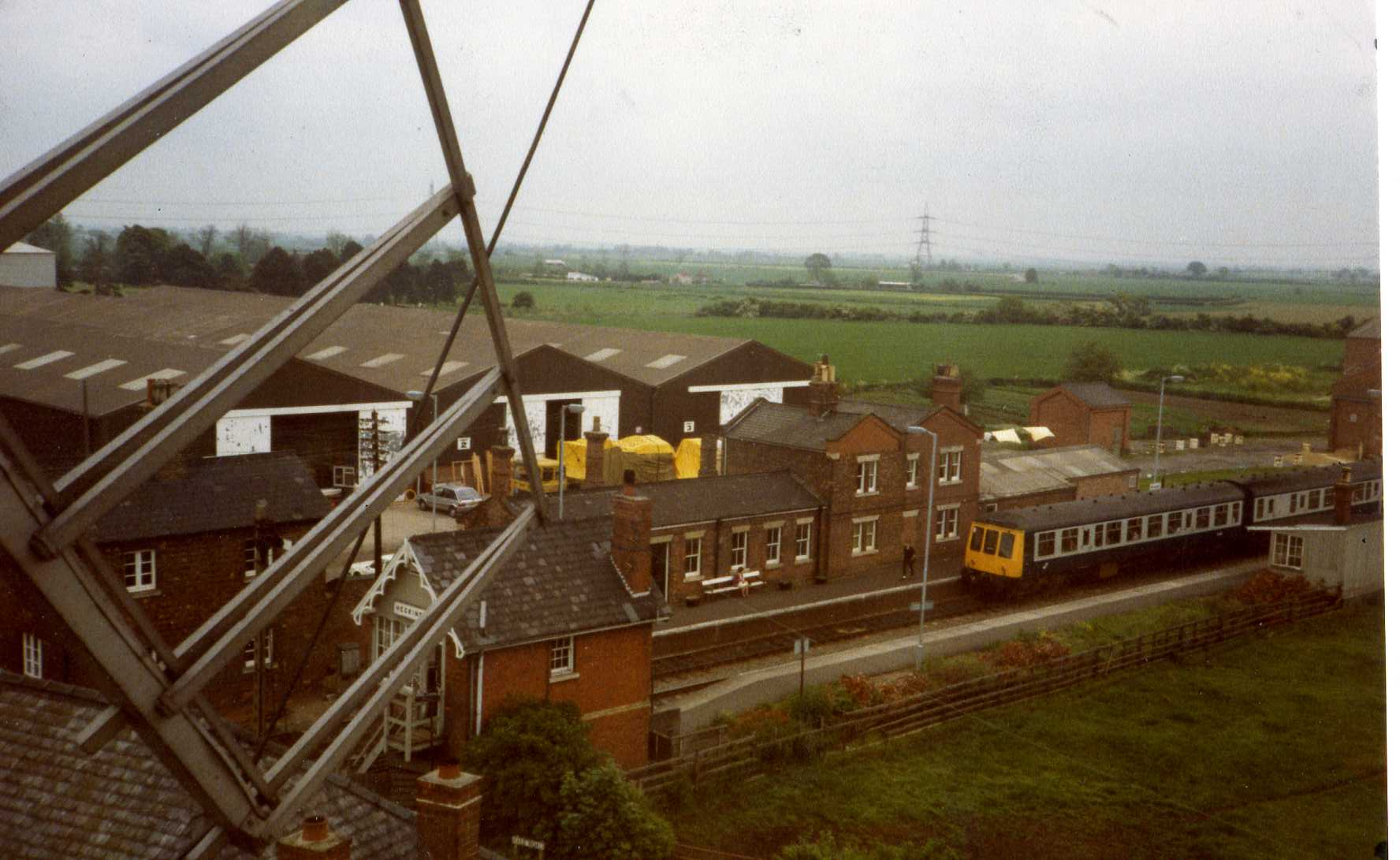
Class 114 at Heckington, 1984.

E50049/E56049 was introduced with 230 hp (170 kW) versions of the power unit, which proved to have a much more acceptable power to weight ratio, and during 1959 and 1960 all the class were fitted with these more powerful engines and settled down to work most Lincolnshire local services (with regular visits to South Yorkshire and Nottinghamshire) for over 25 years.

One of the class (one of the cars 50040) along with another 3-car unit was on one of the last passenger service from Louth to Grimsby on 20 December 1980. Other services where Cleethorpes to Barton-upon-Humber, Cleethorpes to Sheffield via Retford, and Peterborough to Grimsby via Boston, Willoughby and Louth.

The units were rarely seen outside of their normal working area, but in June 1957 E50029/E56029 worked a special excursion from Ipswich to Chessington South.

Later in their life, they were moved to the Tyseley TMD (TS) West Midlands, but still came back to the Lincolnshire area on a regular basis.

== Accidents and incidents ==
- On 25 January 1963, a set working the Grantham - Lincoln Central service collided with the rear (tender) of a stationary Class B1 steam locomotive near Bracebridge Gas Sidings Signalbox near Lincoln. Two people were killed and three injured.
- On 12 February 1968, the 06:48 Sheffield - Cleethorpes was hit in the rear by a coal train ran. The Class 114 had a parcel van as a tail load which took the force of the impact, but the rear cab was still severely crushed.
- On 28 November 1969, 50031 + 56031 ran through level crossing gates at Great Coates level crossing near Grimsby, striking a Dodge articulated lorry and carrying it 46 feet into the station. 3 people needed hospital treatment. The driver had run a red signal.
- On 28 January 1970, 56020 & 50020, travelling at 50mph, struck a tanker traversing Dowdyke Bank level crossing between Spalding & Boston.
- On 9 December 1983, 53049 + 54049 working the 17:32 Cleethorpes - Sheffield collided with the 15:02 Drax - Lindsey (900-tons of empty oil tanks hauled by 47299) at Wrawby junction, a convergence of lines just outside Barnetby, Lincolnshire. One passenger was killed.
- On 26 July 1986, 53016 + 54034, coupled to Class 105 54434 + 51278, collided with a van that had driven onto Lockington Level Crossing against flashing lights. 54434 derailed and ran down the embankment, turning 180 degrees before coming to rest on its side. All vehicles were badly damaged. Nine people were killed.

== Prototype unit ==
In addition to the 49 production units, a fiftieth two-car unit (cars 50000 and 56000) was built to test the Rolls-Royce engine type and Twin Disc hydraulic transmission later used on the Class 127 units. Initially the unit underwent trials on the Cockermouth, Keswick and Penrith railway in early 1957, but was subsequently also allocated to Lincoln and worked the same diagrams as the other 49. The unit was withdrawn in October 1967 as it was deemed to be non-standard, thus never received an official TOPS class designation.

Table of orders and numbers
Lot No.	Type	Diagram	Qty	Fleet numbers	Weight	Notes
30209	Driving Motor Brake Second (DMBS)	516	48	50001–50048	37 long tons 10 cwt (84,000 lb or 38.1 t)	
30210	Driving Trailer Composite with lavatory (DTCL)	641	49	56001–56049	29 long tons 10 cwt (66,100 lb or 30 t)	
30341	Driving Motor Brake Second (DMBS)	632	1	50000	41 long tons 3 cwt (92,200 lb or 41.8 t)	
30342	Driving Trailer Composite with lavatory (DTCL)	641	1	56000	31 long tons 3 cwt (69,800 lb or 31.6 t)	
30459	Driving Motor Brake Second (DMBS)	516	1	50049	37 long tons 10 cwt (84,000 lb or 38.1 t)	

Table of engines fitted
Vehicle number	Engine
50000	Two (2) Rolls-Royce 238 hp (177 kW) engines and torque converter drives
50001–50048	Two (2) Leyland 150 hp (112 kW) engines initially, but later were replaced by two 230 hp (172 kW) BUT engines.
50049	Two (2) Albion 230 hp (172 kW) engines

== Withdrawal ==
The units were replaced by newer "Sprinter" units in the late 1980s. By 1992, only two units were still in service, based at Tyseley depot in Birmingham, and all were withdrawn by July of that year. The final set, T027, was eventually preserved at Midland Railway Centre, Butterley.

== Non-passenger use ==
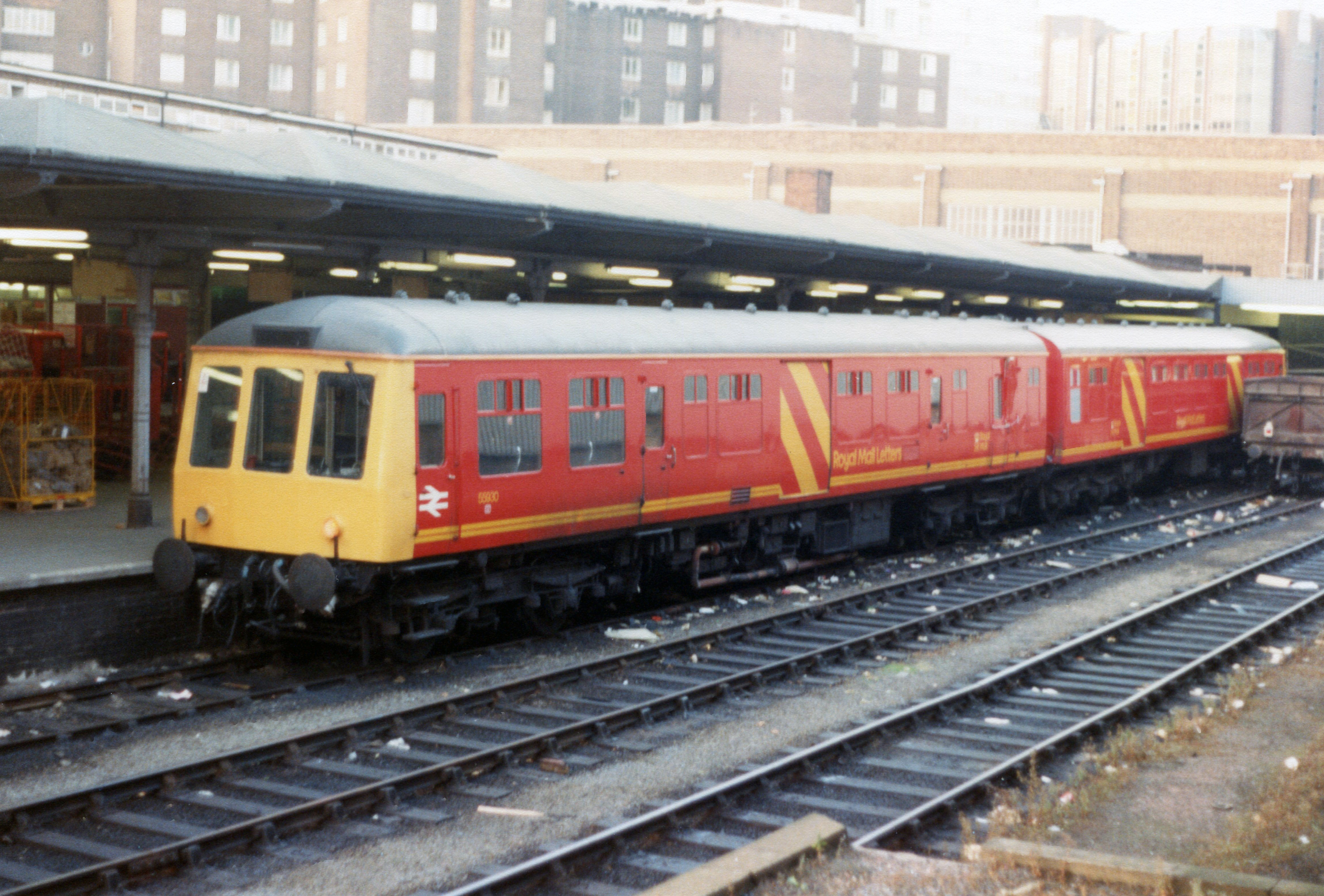
No. 55930 in Royal Mail livery

Five units were rebuilt as parcels units with roller-shutter doors in 1988. These were repainted in Royal Mail red livery, and were based at Cambridge depot. They were withdrawn in 1991. Four of the units were scrapped, whilst the fifth was rebuilt as a test train for the new automatic train protection (ATP). This unit passed into EWS ownership with the privatisation of Britain's railways. It was then used in a new role of a route-learner unit, until it was withdrawn in 2002. It was eventually preserved in 2004.

Parcels cars - converted in 1986

Original number	2nd TOPS number	Parcel number	Parcel number2
50010	53010	55930	
50015	53015	55929	
50018	53018	55928	
50032	53032	55932	
50040	53040	55931	
56009	54009	54903	
56015	54015	54904	
56016	54016	54901	
56034	54034	55933	54900
56036	54036	55932	54902

All were allocated to CA. Initially only the seats were removed, although later a more substantial conversion was carried out, including the fitting of roller shutter doors, with two sets of these on the DTCs where the vestibules/passenger doors had been.

== Departmental ==
Original number	2nd TOPS number	Parcel number	Department number	Usage
50015	53015	55929	ADB977775	ATP Test Unit
50036	53036	-	977769	-
56015	54015	54904	977776	ATP Test Unit
56027	54027	-	977770	-

ADB 977775/6 were converted into an Automatic Train Protection demonstration train and fitted with both types of ATP systems from the BR pilot schemes c1991. Following the abandonment of ATP development, the unit found a new lease of life with EWS as a route learning and inspection saloon based initially at Margam South Wales.

== Preservation ==
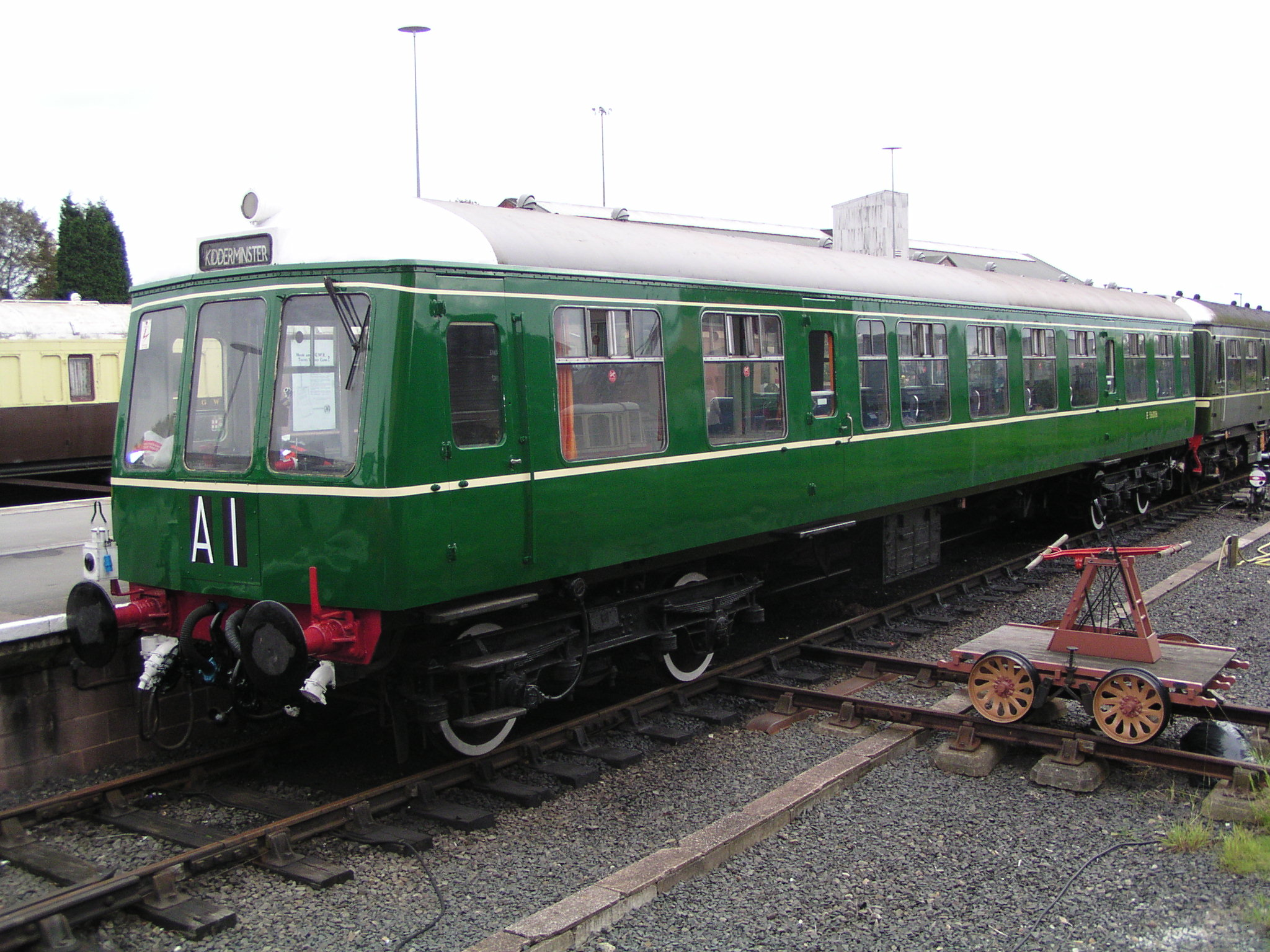
56006 at Kidderminster

Only two sets have been preserved on heritage railways.

Vehicles numbers		Set number	Location	Comments
DMBS	DTCL	Set number	Location	Comments
50019	56006	T027	Midland Railway - Butterley	-
50015	56015	CA924	Midland Railway - Butterley	Rebuilt to parcels unit 55929+54904. Later rebuilt to test unit 977775+977776.
-	54047	TS022	Strathspey Railway	-
