= British Rail Class 118 =

Class of diesel multiple units

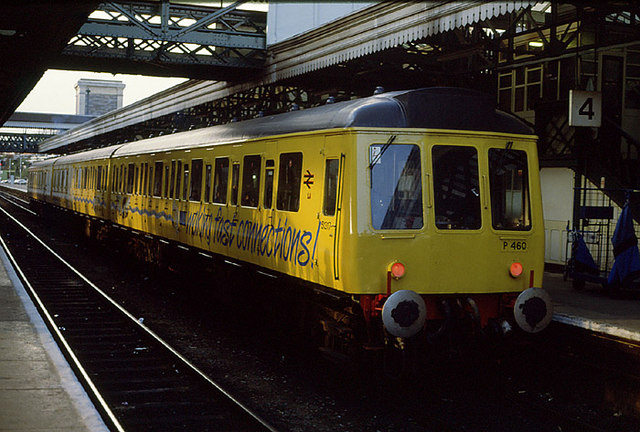
- BR class 118 DMU in British Telecom advertising livery
- In service: 1960-1994
- Manufacturer: Birmingham Railway Carriage and Wagon Company
- Number built: 15 sets (45 cars)
- Number preserved: 1 car (DMS 51321)
- Formation: 3-car sets: DMBS-TCL-DMS
- Capacity: DMBS: 65 second TCL: 24 first, 50 second DMS: 89 second
- Operator: British Rail
- Line served: Western Region

Specifications
- Car length: 64 ft 6 in (19.66 m)
- Width: 9 ft 3 in (2.82 m)
- Maximum speed: 70 mph (113 km/h)
- Weight: Power cars: 36 long tons 0 cwt (80,600 lb or 36.6 t), Trailer cars: 30 long tons 0 cwt (67,200 lb or 30.5 t)
- Prime mover: Two BUT engines per power car
- Power output: 150 hp (112 kW) per engine
- Safety system: AWS
- Multiple working: ■ Blue Square

The British Rail Class 118 diesel multiple units were built by the Birmingham Railway Carriage and Wagon Company (BRCW) and introduced from 1960. It was a licence-built version of the British Rail Class 116.

== History ==
BR Derby was inundated with orders for the Class 116, so the work was put out to tender. All Class 118s were built in Birmingham by Birmingham Railway Carriage and Wagon Company.

In its final days, vehicles were allocated to Tyseley depot in Birmingham, and were all withdrawn by the end of 1994. Like most first generation DMUs they were originally BR Green, then plain blue, and finally blue and grey, with a few receiving Network SouthEast livery. One set was painted in all over yellow with advertisements for British Telecom.
