= British Rail Class 120 =

Class of British diesel multiple unit train

British Rail Class 120 Swindon 3-car Cross-country sets
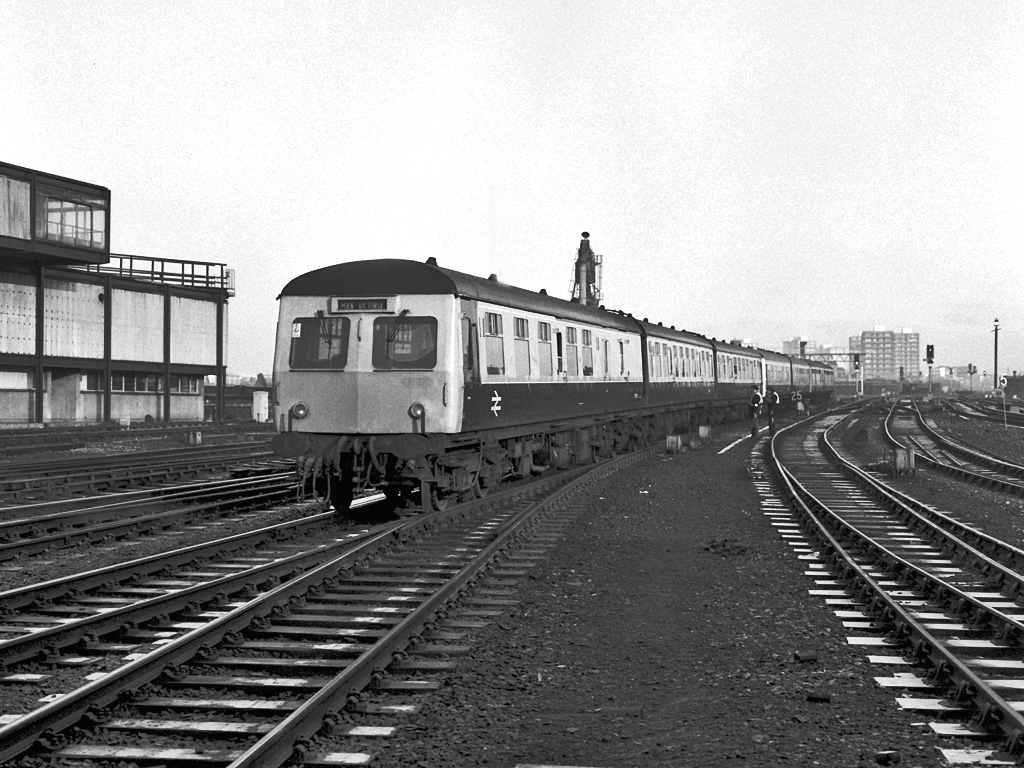
- In service: 1958–1989
- Manufacturer: British Railways
- Order nos.: 30334 (50647-50695); 30335 (50696-50744); 30336 (59255-59301); 30515 (51573-51581); 30516 (51582-51590); 30517 (59579-59588); 30559 (51781-51787); 30560 (51788-51794); 30561 (59679-59685)
- Built at: BR Swindon Works
- Family name: First generation
- Replaced: Steam locomotives hauling auto coaches and coaches
- Constructed: 1957–1960
- Number built: 194 cars
- Number preserved: 1 car (a TSLRB)
- Number scrapped: 193 cars
- Formation: 3 car sets: DMSL-TSL[RB]-DMBC
- Diagram: DP204 or BR586; DP205 or BR637; DQ101 or BR587; DQ303 or BR587; DQ304 or BR636; DT210 or BR572; DT217 or BR561
- Fleet numbers: 51573-51581, 51781-51787, 53696-53744 (DMBC); 59255-59301, 59579-59588, 59679-59685 (TSLRB); 50647-50695, 51582-51590, 51788-51794 (DMSL)
- Capacity: DMC: 18 first class and 16 second class seats; DMSL: 68 second class seats; TSLRB: 60 second class seats; TSL: 68 second class seats
- Operator: British Rail
- Depots: CA Cambridge; CF Cardiff Canton; CH Chester; DY Derby Etches Park; HA Haymarket; LA Laira; RG Reading
- Lines served: Halwill Junc - Wadebridge; Par - Newquay; St Erth - St Ives; Truro - Falmouth; Truro - Newquay

Specifications
- Car body construction: Steel
- Car length: 64 ft 7 7/16 in (19.70 m) (DP205, DQ304, over body); 64 ft 6 1/8 in (19.66 m) (others, over body)
- Width: 9 ft 3 in (2.82 m) (overall)
- Height: 12 ft 9 1/2 in (3.90 m) (overall)
- Doors: Slam
- Wheelbase: 46 ft 6 in (14.17 m) (bogie centres); 8 ft 6 in (2.59 m) (bogies)
- Maximum speed: 70 mph (113 km/h)
- Weight: Dia 586: 36.50 long tons (37.09 t; 40.88 short tons); Dia 587: 36.35 long tons (36.93 t; 40.71 short tons); Dia 561: 30.60 long tons (31.09 t; 34.27 short tons); Dia 636: 36.95 long tons (37.54 t; 41.38 short tons); Dia 637: 37.05 long tons (37.64 t; 41.50 short tons); Dia 572: 30.15 long tons (30.63 t; 33.77 short tons)
- Prime mover: Two BUT (AEC) of 150 hp (110 kW) per power car
- Power output: 600 hp (447 kW) per 3-car set
- Transmission: Standard mechanical
- HVAC: Oil burning air heater
- Bogies: DD1 mk1 and mk2 (one of each); DD2 mk1 and mk2 (one of each); DT3 mk1 and mk2 (one of each)
- Braking system: Vacuum
- Safety system: AWS
- Coupling system: Screw
- Multiple working: ■ Blue Square
- Track gauge: 4 ft 8 1/2 in (1,435 mm)

The British Rail Class 120 was a cross-country DMU in three-car formation, built at the British Rail Swindon Works.

== Operation ==
From first introduction, units were based at Laira and operated several services in Cornwall including the Truro and Newquay Railway route via Perranporth.

== Accidents and incidents ==
- On 12 May 1978, the unit containing 51793-59684-51794, struck a lorry at Oyne and the front two cars were derailed. The unit was on the 07:43 Aberdeen to Inverness. Out of the 54 passengers on board, only 5 people suffered minor injuries.
