= British Rail Class 121 =

Class of British diesel multiple units

British Rail Class 121 Bubble Car
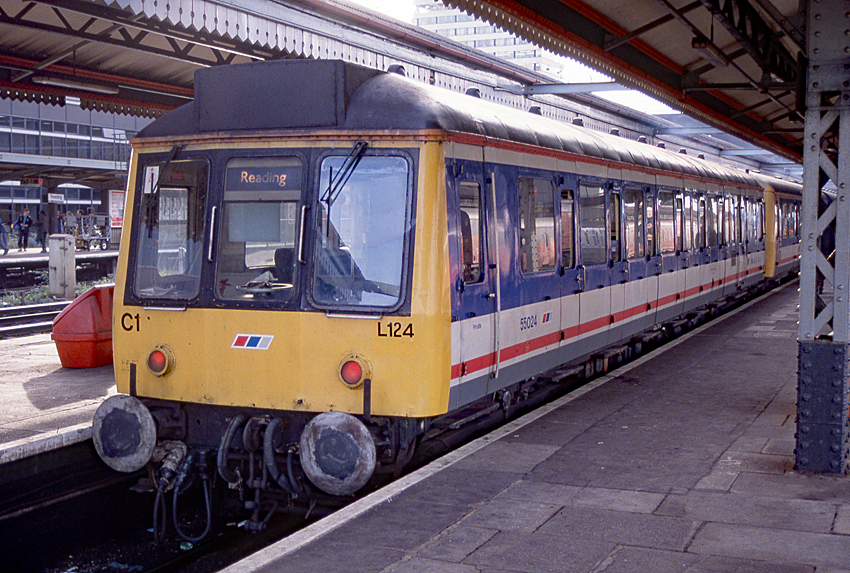
- A Class 121 at Reading in 1992

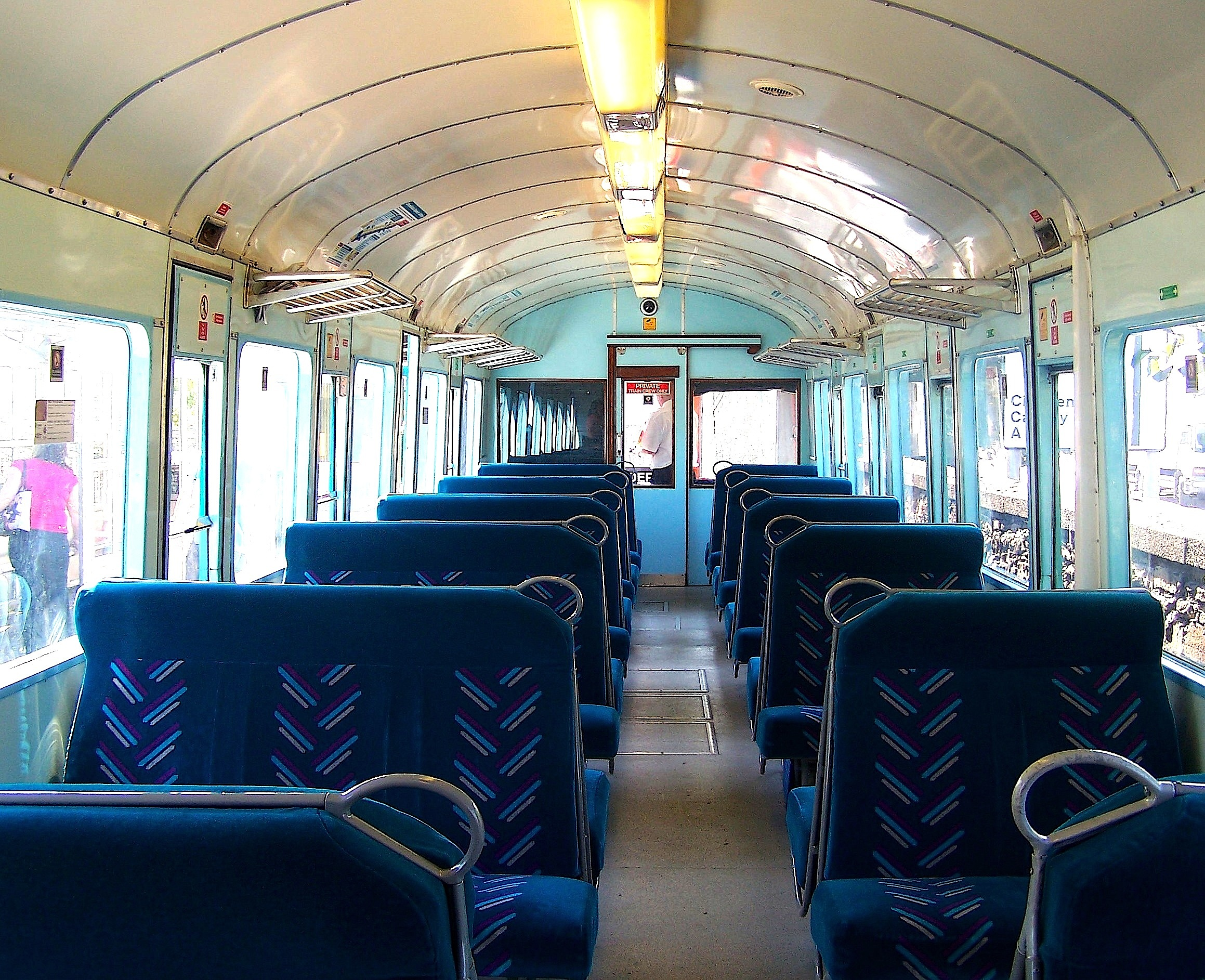
- Interior of 121032
- In service: May 1960 – present
- Manufacturer: Pressed Steel Company
- Order nos.: 30518 (DMBS); 30519 (DTS)
- Family name: First generation
- Replaced: Steam locomotives and carriages GWR railcars
- Constructed: 1960–1961
- Entered service: 1960
- Scrapped: 1978–2011
- Number built: 16 (DMBS); 10 (DTS)
- Number preserved: 10 (DMBS); 2 (DTS)
- Number scrapped: 4 (DMBS); 8 (DTS)
- Formation: Single car (with trailer); DMBS (+DTS)
- Diagram: DQ221 (DMBS); DS201 (DTS); DX201 (DMBS, by 1994)
- Fleet numbers: 55020–55035 (DMBS); 56280-56289 (DTS, as built); 54280-54289 (DTS, renumbered)
- Capacity: 65 (DMBS); 91 (DTS)
- Operators: British Railways, Network SouthEast, Regional Railways, Silverlink, Railtrack, Network Rail, Arriva Trains Wales, The Chiltern Railways Company
- Depots: BR Bath Road; BY Bletchley; LA Laira; RG Reading; TS Tyseley
- Lines served: Aylesbury–Princes Risborough line; Lostwithiel – Fowey; North Cornwall Railway; St Erth - St Ives

Specifications
- Car body construction: Steel
- Car length: 64 ft 6 in (19,660 mm) (over body)
- Width: 9 ft 0 in (2,740 mm) (over body)
- Height: 12 ft 4 1/2 in (3,772 mm)
- Doors: Slam
- Articulated sections: Single car (2)
- Wheelbase: 46 ft 6 in (14.17 m) (bogie centres); 8 ft 6 in (2.59 m) (bogies)
- Maximum speed: 70 mph (113 km/h)
- Weight: 38 t (37 long tons; 42 short tons) (DMBS); 30 t (30 long tons; 33 short tons) (DTS)
- Prime movers: 2 × AEC of 150 hp (110 kW) per DMBS; or; 2 × Leyland 1595 of 150 hp (110 kW) per DMBS
- Engine type: 11.1-litre naturally aspirated Diesel
- Cylinder count: 6 (horizontal) per engine
- Power output: 300 hp (220 kW) (DMBS)
- Transmission: Mechanical (DMBS)
- HVAC: Oil burning air heater
- Bogies: DD10 mk3 and mk4 (DMBS, one of each); DT9 mk4 and mk5 (DTS, one of each)
- Braking system: Vacuum
- Safety system: AWS (DMBS)
- Coupling system: Screw
- Multiple working: ■ Blue Square
- Headlight type: Fluorescent and tungsten
- Track gauge: 4 ft 8 1/2 in (1,435 mm)

The British Rail Class 121 diesel multiple units were built by Pressed Steel from 1960 to 1961. Sixteen driving motor vehicles were built, numbered 55020–55035, which were supplemented by ten single-ended trailer vehicles, numbered 56280–56289 (later renumbered 54280–54289). They have a top speed of 70 mph (113 km/h), with slam-doors and vacuum brakes. The driving motor vehicles were nicknamed "Bubble Cars" by some enthusiasts, a nickname endorsed and made official by final passenger service operator The Chiltern Railways Company. The Class 121 is Britain's longest-serving DMU, operating in passenger service for 57 years until 2017.

== British Railways service ==
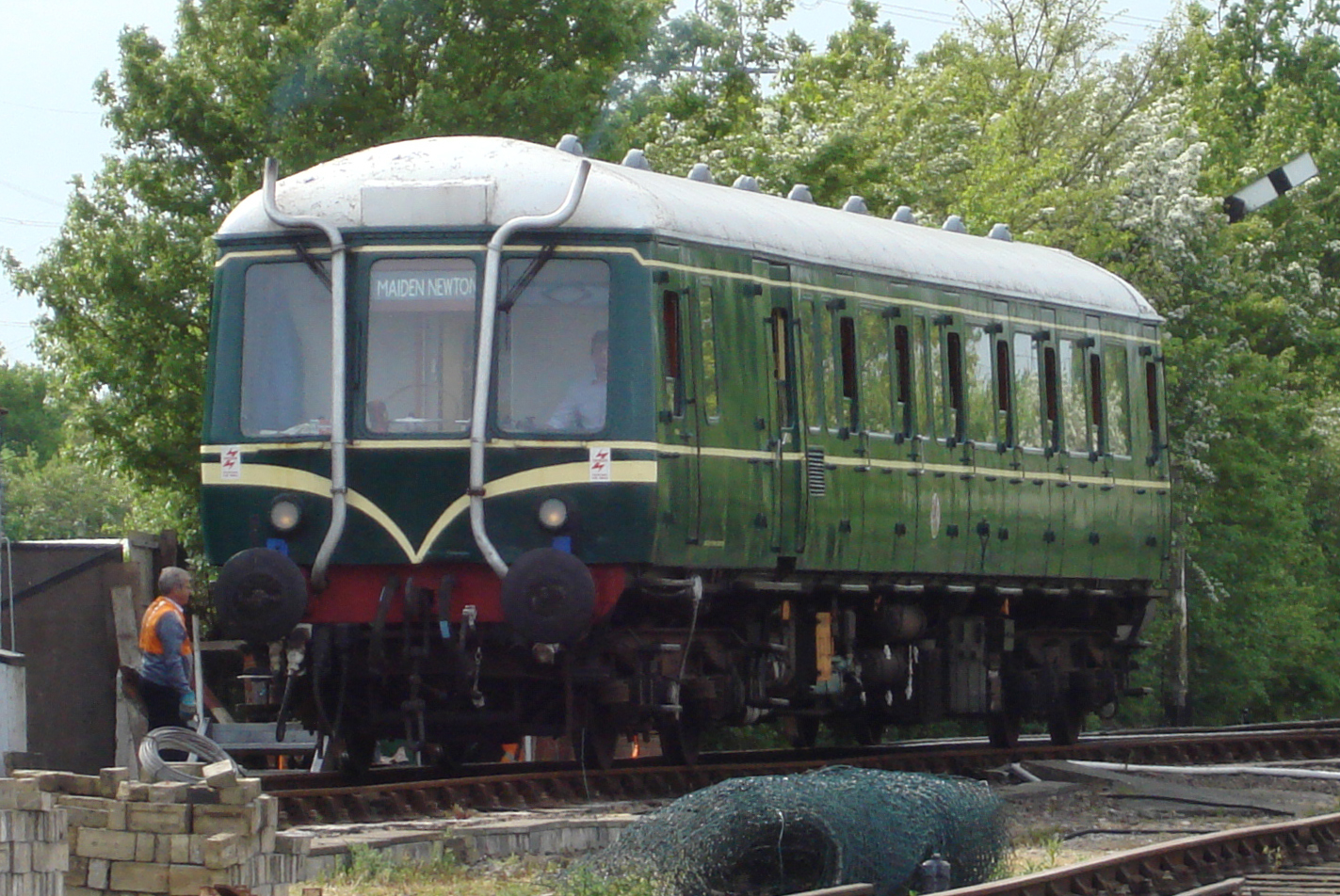
Preserved W55033 at the Colne Valley Railway in original green livery, with yellow "speed whiskers" (warning stripes) on the cab front. This unit differs from the rest of the class by the fitment of a small route indicator box above the centre window, like a Class 122, rather than a large headcode box.

The Class 121 vehicles were introduced in 1960 for use on the Western Region of British Rail. They were used on various lightly-used branch lines in Cornwall, including the Looe branch; the branch lines off the main line in the Thames Valley, including the Greenford branch line; the Bridport branch line, closed in 1975; and the Severn Beach line in Bristol. In 1978, all of the units were still allocated to Western Region depots.

Unlike the earlier, but similar, Class 122, which had a small destination indicator in the roof dome, the Class 121 had a four-character headcode box in the roof dome, with the destination indicator inside the top of the centre cab window.

== Past operations ==
=== Silverlink ===
Silverlink inherited a small fleet of four "Bubble Cars". They were mainly used on the Marston Vale line from Bletchley to Bedford, as well as non-electrified lines in North London, such as the Gospel Oak to Barking line. The units replaced the previous fleet of Class 108 and Class 115 units, and were supplemented with a fleet of Class 117 units cascaded from Thames Valley services.

The four units, nos. 55023/27/29/31, were based at Bletchley depot, where staff repainted set L123 (55023) into its original British Railways green livery; the others remained in obsolete Network SouthEast livery. In 1996, set L123 was withdrawn from traffic, and the other three were hired to Great Eastern for use on the Sudbury branch. These returned to Bletchley in 1997/98. Two of the units (121027 and 121029) were repainted into Silverlink's purple and green livery, and the third (121031) into Network SouthEast livery. The three units also received names from withdrawn Class 117 units.

- 121027 - Bletchley TMD
- 121029 - Marston Vale
- 121031 - Leslie Crabbe.

The units were replaced on Silverlink duties in 2001 by Class 150 Sprinter units, which had been cascaded from Central Trains. The units have all since been transferred to departmental duties.

=== Arriva Trains Wales ===
In 2005, unit 55032 (121032) was purchased from preservation by Arriva Trains Wales and returned to mainline service, working Cardiff Bay services. It was sold to Chiltern Railways in 2013.

=== Chiltern Railways ===
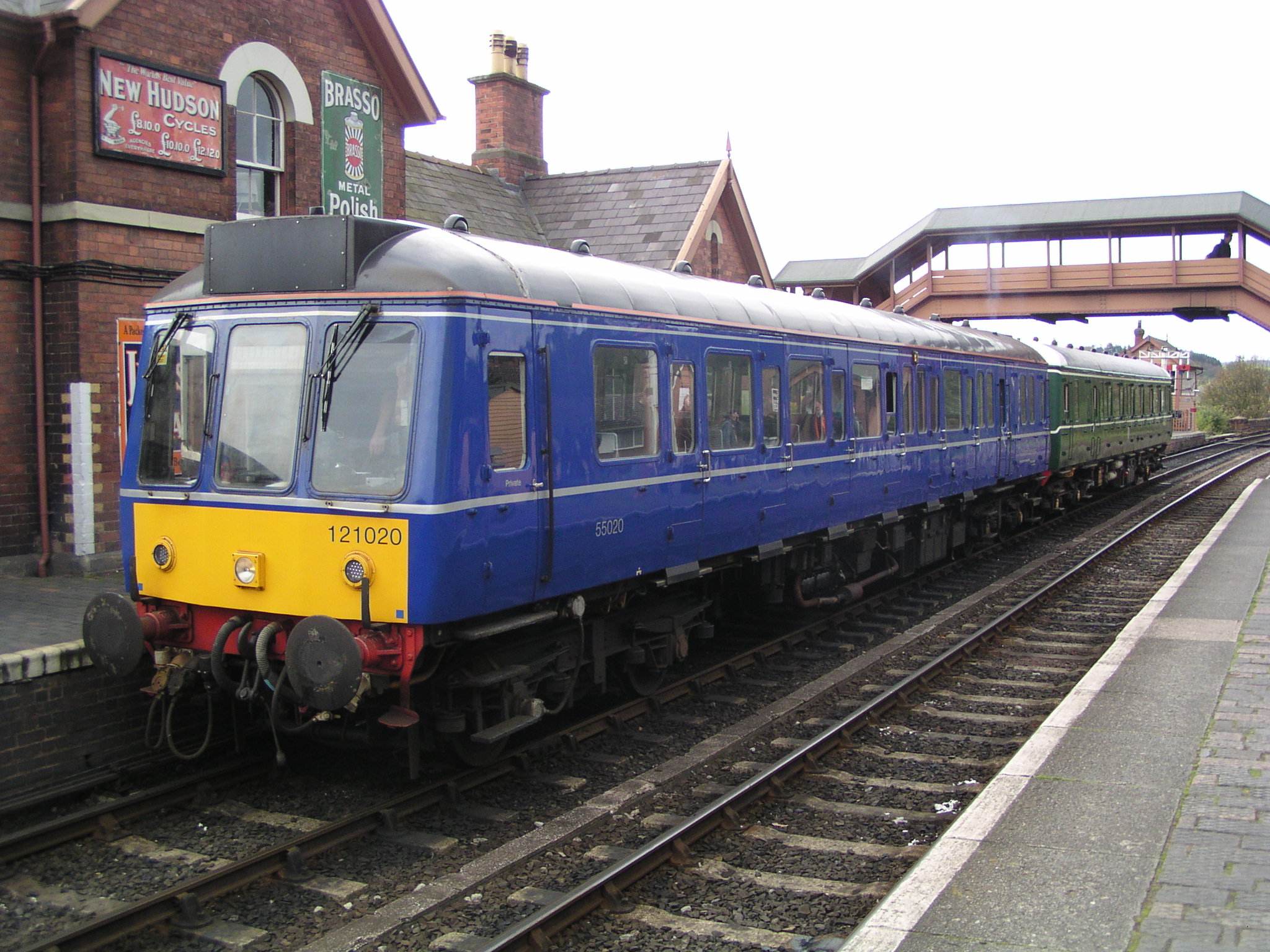
121020 and 121034 at Bewdley in 2004

In 2003, Chiltern Railways reintroduced "Heritage" diesel multiple units on its Aylesbury to Princes Risborough shuttle service. For this purpose, unit 121020 was purchased from Network Rail and heavily refurbished to allow it to operate passenger services. It was repainted into Chiltern Railways' blue livery. The introduction of this unit allowed the release of a Class 165 Network Turbo unit; this unit has been fitted with secondary (magnetic) door locking and other safety features, and thus was exempt from 30 November 2005 deadline for the withdrawal of all Mark 1 vehicles. Electronic destination indicators and internal passenger information systems were recovered from 165032 at refurbishment and fitted to this unit. The external exhaust pipes were rerouted through the brake van area.

In May 2011, a second "Bubble Car" was reintroduced to regular service. Unit 121034, previously based at Tyseley Loco Works, was less-extensively refurbished for use by the Birmingham Railway Museum. It is painted in BR Green livery and was also used on Aylesbury to Princes Risborough services, when required.

Both units were additionally used on shuttles, as required, between Aylesbury and Quainton Road, on the occasion of events at the Buckinghamshire Railway Centre.

In March 2013, Chiltern Railways acquired 121032 from Arriva Trains Wales; it sold the unit for preservation in 2015.

Chiltern's two final units were withdrawn from service on 19 May 2017, due to difficulties in obtaining spare parts given the age of the units, which were more than 50 years old. They were subsequently sold.

== Current operations ==
Upon the privatisation of British Rail, the Class 121 fleet was only operated by one train operating company, namely Silverlink, with several more units in departmental duties with Railtrack. Since Chiltern Railways retired its final two units in May 2017, there have been no examples left in revenue-making service.

As of 2026, two units are owned by Locomotive Services Limited:

- 55022 (former Chiltern Railways/Network Rail route learner 977873/960014) was acquired in 2016. It has been heavily refurbished and, as of September 2023, operates as part of the chairman's private fleet, bearing the name 'Flora'.
- 55034 (former Chiltern Railways 121034) was acquired for use as a route learner in 2017. It has since been loaned to heritage railways; as of June 2024, it is on loan to the Cholsey and Wallingford Railway, having previously been loaned to the Ecclesbourne Valley Railway.

== Preservation ==
Class 121s have proved popular for preservation on heritage railways:

Vehicle no.		Unit no.	Vehicle type	Location	Notes
Original	Departmental	Unit no.	Vehicle type	Location	Notes
56287	–	L211	DTS	Epping Ongar Railway	
56289	–	L263	DTS	East Lancashire Railway	
55020	977722	L120	DMBS	Bodmin and Wenford Railway	Departmental unit 960002 (1992–2002) then returned to passenger use until 2017
55023	–	L123	DMBS	Chinnor and Princes Risborough Railway	
55024	977858	L124	DMBS	Chinnor and Princes Risborough Railway	Returned to traffic 30 March 2019
55025	977859	L125	DMBS	Vale of Berkeley Railway	Unit stored pending restoration
55027	977975	P127	DMBS	Ecclesbourne Valley Railway	Previously Severn Tunnel emergency train 960302
55028	977860	L128	DMBS	Swanage Railway	
55029	977968	L129	DMBS	Rushden, Higham and Wellingborough Railway	Damaged by fire in May 2015.
55031	977976	T002	DMBS	Ecclesbourne Valley Railway	Previously Severn Tunnel emergency train 960303
55032		T003	DMBS	Wensleydale Railway	
55033	977826	T004	DMBS	Colne Valley Railway	Only bubble car to have carried Midline livery, when operating in the West Midlands PTE area.

== Order details ==
Table of orders and numbers
Lot No.	Type	Diagram	Qty	Fleet numbers	Notes
30518	Driving Motor Brake Second (DMBS)	512	16	55020–55035	
30519	Driving Trailer Second (DTS)	513	10	56280–56289	

== Model railways ==
An OO gauge model of the Class 121 was produced by Lima in 1998, as unit 55035 in all-over rail blue livery and unit 55027 in Network SouthEast livery. In 2006, Hornby Railways launched its first version of the BR Class 121 in OO gauge. This model was produced in BR blue and BR green, using the Lima body mouldings that Hornby had acquired. Since 2017, Hornby have produced a basic representation of the prototype as part of their Railroad range in BR Green.
