= British Rail Class 117 =

British diesel multiple-unit passenger trains

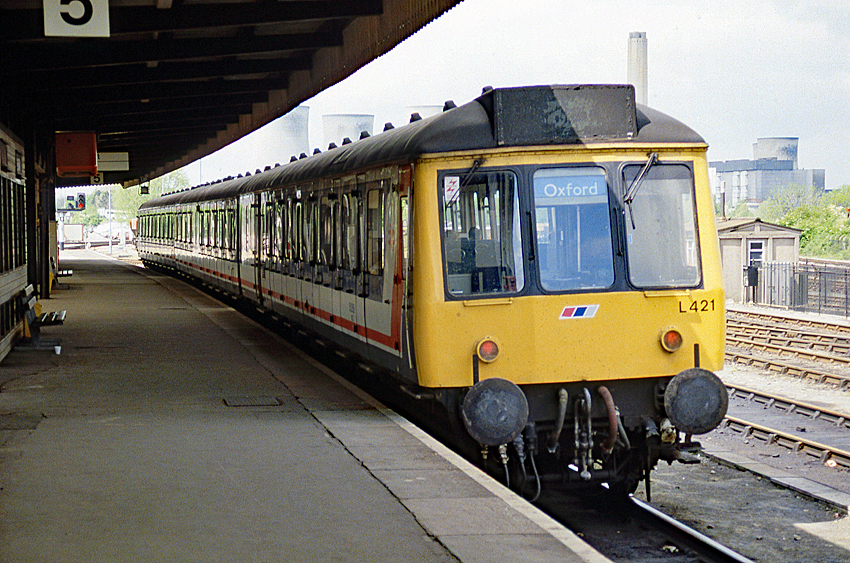
- A Class 117 at Didcot Parkway, 1989

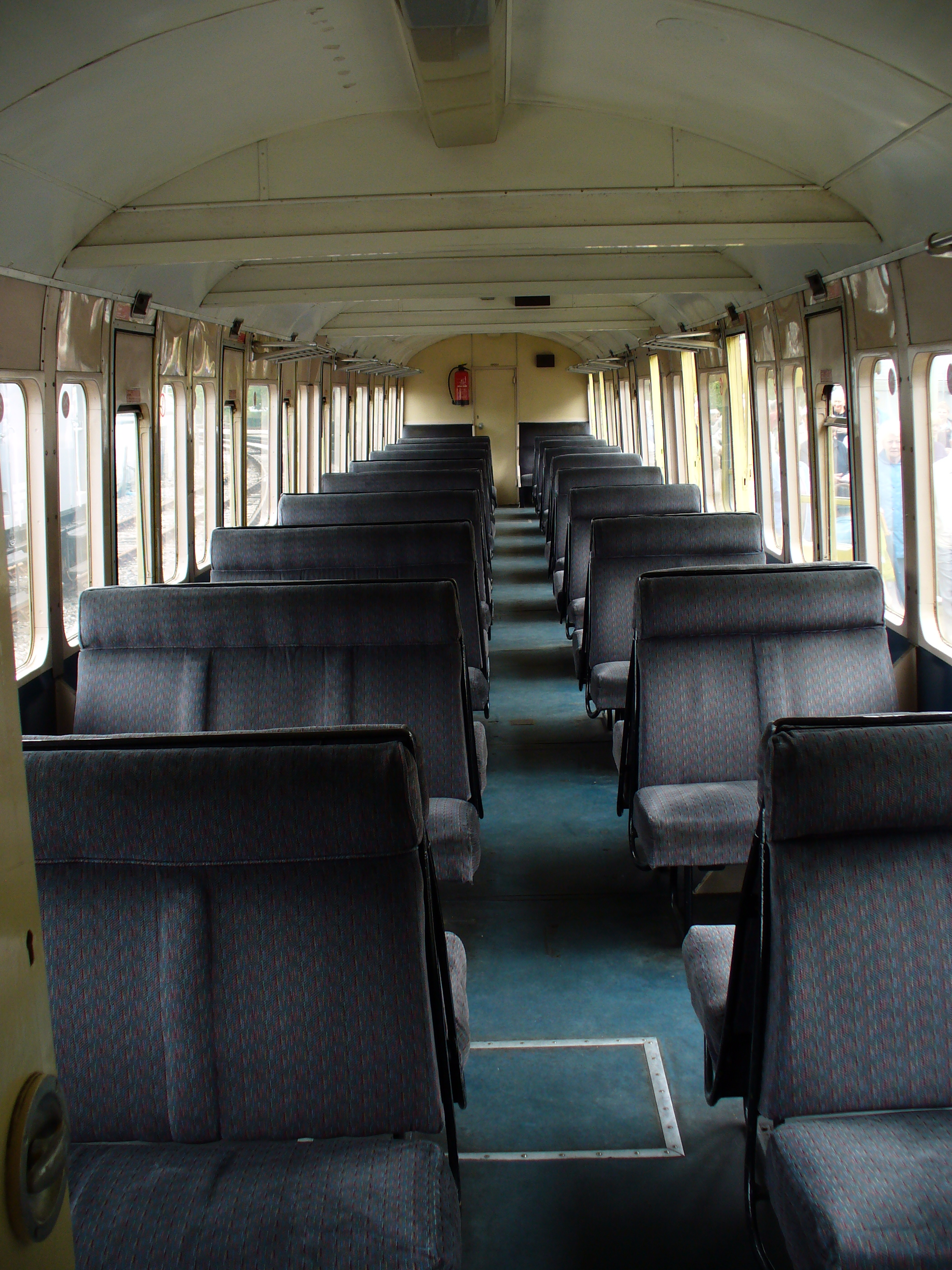
- Interior of a Class 117.
- In service: 1959–2000; one unit used in departmental use until 2015
- Manufacturer: Pressed Steel Company
- Family name: First generation
- Replaced: Steam locomotives and carriages
- Constructed: 1959–1961
- Number built: 123 cars (42 DMBS, 42 DMS, 39 TCL)
- Number preserved: 35 cars (17 DMBS, 16 DMS, 23 TCL)
- Number scrapped: 88 cars (25 DMBS, 26 DMS, 16 TCL)
- Successor: Class 150; Class 153; Class 156; Class 165; Class 166
- Formation: DMBS-TCL-DMS
- Operators: British Rail; ScotRail; Silverlink
- Lines served: Western Region; London Midland region; Scottish region

Specifications
- Car body construction: Steel
- Car length: 64 ft 0 in (19.51 m)
- Width: 9 ft 3 in (2.82 m)
- Height: 12 ft 8 1/2 in (3.87 m)
- Doors: Slam
- Maximum speed: 70 mph (113 km/h)
- Weight: Power cars: 36 long tons 0 cwt (80,600 lb or 36.6 t), Trailer cars: 30 long tons 0 cwt (67,200 lb or 30.5 t)
- Prime movers: BUT (AEC) then BUT (Leyland), of 150 hp (110 kW), (both types), two per power car
- Power output: 600 hp (450 kW) per 3-car set
- Transmission: Mechanical
- HVAC: Oil burning air heater
- Braking system: Vacuum
- Safety system: AWS
- Coupling system: Screw
- Multiple working: ■ Blue Square
- Track gauge: 4 ft 8 1/2 in (1,435 mm)

The British Rail Class 117 diesel multiple units (DMUs) were built by Pressed Steel from 1959 to 1961. It was a licence-built variant of the British Rail Class 116.

== Original work ==
A total of 123 Class 117 cars were built by Pressed Steel between 1959 and 1961, delivered as 39 three-car units plus three pairs of spare motor coaches. When first introduced in 1960, these three-car units were all based with the similar Class 121 single carriage (railcar) units on British Railways Western Region for suburban work out of London Paddington. The units were largely based at Reading and Southall depots. The units remained here for many years working these services.

The type was used for a railtour from Paddington to the south west on 31 May 1969.

== Later operations ==
In the 1980s, expiry of other DMUs facilitated moves for some units from the Western Region to Birmingham, as below, and Scotland, prior to the delivery of new units to replace them. They were given refurbishments.

The first changes in ownership occurred in the late 1980s, when the Scottish, Welsh, Cornish and Birmingham based units were transferred to Provincial Services, later Regional Railways, in the sectorisation of British Rail, while the Southall-based units transferred to Network SouthEast.

They were replaced on the lines out of Paddington when the Class 165/1 Network Turbo units came into service by 28 November 1992.

They continued operation on the former Western Region until replaced by Class 150 and Class 153 DMUs by 21 May 1993, although the type could be found running Penzance - Looe services until 1997. An attempt was made to remove them from Cornish work using Class 142 "Skipper/Pacer" railcars, but these fixed wheelbase units proved to be a liability on the tight Cornish branchline curves, increasing rail and wheel wear, and were transferred to the North of England instead. The 117s were finally replaced with the advent of more Class 150s and Class 153s freed up from other areas.

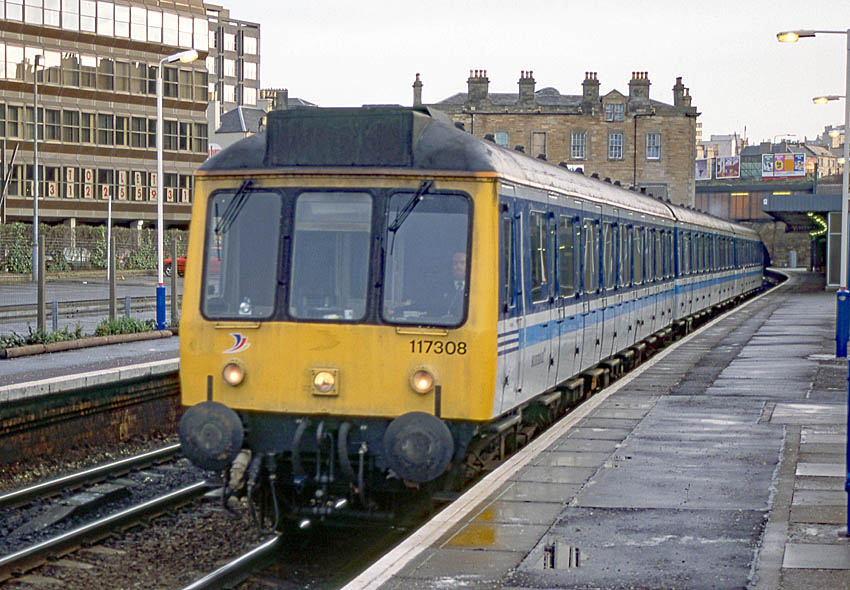
117308 in Scotrail livery at Edinburgh Haymarket in 1994

The type was used in Scotland between Edinburgh - Perth, Cowdenbeath and Markinch using the Forth Bridge and continued to work in Scotland until 12 January 1998, where they were replaced with Class 156s. The final day of 117s running in Scotland was 27 November 1999.

In 2000, Class 150 Sprinter units replaced the Class 117 units on Silverlink, finally bringing to an end decades of service on Britain's rail network in front line service.

Table of orders and numbers
Lot No.	Type	Diagram	Qty	Fleet numbers	Notes
30546	Driving Motor Brake Second (DMBS)	534	42	51332–51373	
30547	Trailer Composite with lavatory (TCL)	601	39	59484–59522	
30548	Driving Motor Second (DMS)	535	42	51374–51415	

== Preservation ==
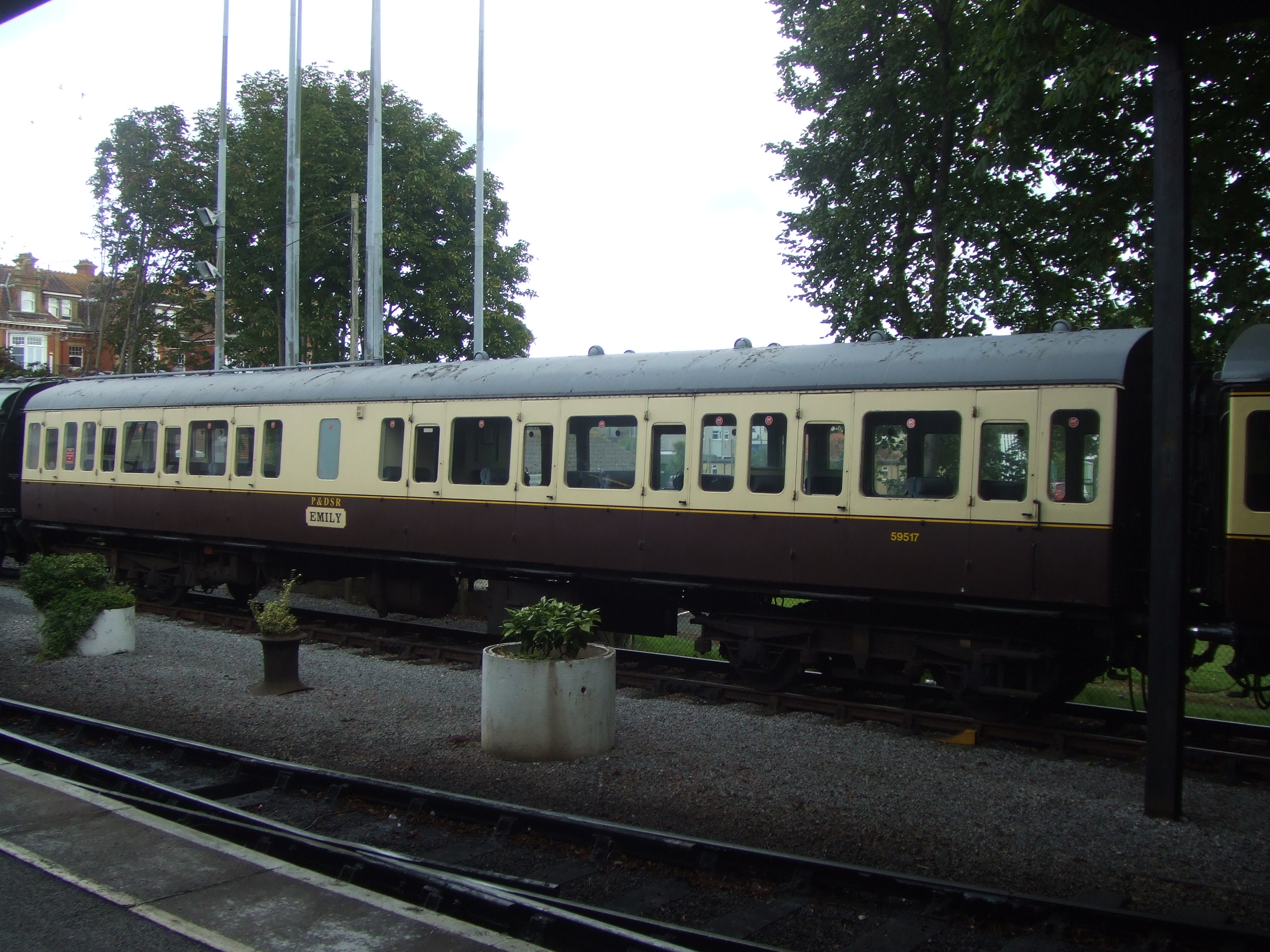
Built as part of a Class 117 3-car dmu, No.59517 is now used as a loco hauled coach on the Paignton & Dartmouth Steam Railway. It is a TC(L) Trailer Composite built by Pressed Steel in 1959. Now in P&DSR branded chocolate & cream livery.

Due to the type's longevity, 12 units have been preserved on heritage railways.

Set number	Vehicle numbers			Livery	Location	Notes
Set number	DMBS	TCL	DMS	Livery	Location	Notes
L425	51363	59510	51405	BR Green	Bo'ness & Kinneil Railway	Moved from the Gloucestershire Warwickshire Railway in operational condition in late 2024
117204	51365	-	51407	BR Green	Plym Valley Railway	Awaiting restoration.
117301	51353	-	-	ScotRail	Wensleydale Railway	Bought by a local community group. 51395 Scrapped March 2013.
117310	-	-	51381	Regional Railways	Mangapps Railway Museum	In active use.
117311	51352	-	51376	Yellow DMBS, Green with whiskers DMS	South Devon Railway	Currently Under Restoration to run with W55000.
-	51371	-	51413	BR Green	MOD Long Marston	Preserved June 2015
117313	51339	-	51382	BR Green	Avon Valley Railway	Moved from the Colne Valley Railway in 2026.
L702	51356	59492	51392	BR Green	Swanage Railway	51356 restored to main line standard.
-	51342	-	51384	BR Green	Epping Ongar Railway	Repainted into BR green from EOR dark blue livery
-	51346	59486	51388	BR Green	Swanage Railway	Overhauled & Mainline Registered.
117444	51360			BR Blue	Gloucestershire Warwickshire Railway	Moved from the Ecclesbourne Valley Railway in 2013
-	51347	59508	51401	BR Green	Gwili Railway	Stored away, awaiting repairs.
-	51367	59511	51402	BR Green	Strathspey Railway	51402 and 51367 both now repainted, 59511 being restored
L432	51370	59520	51412	BR Blue	Mid-Norfolk Railway	In storage as car 51412 is stored first.
-	51372	-	-	BR Blue	Bo'ness & Kinneil Railway	Moved from the Gloucestershire Warwickshire Railway in late 2024, to be used for spares for L425
-	-	59509	51400	BR Green	Wensleydale Railway	Main-line certificated by RESCO
-	51351	-	51397	Green	Pontypool and Blaenavon Railway	
L720	51354	-	51396	BR Green	Peak Rail	
-	-	-	51375	BR Green	Chinnor and Princes Risborough Railway	Rebuilt as an intermediate car by Chiltern Railways for use as a water jetting van. Sold in 2015 to its current owner
-	-	59488	-	Green and Cream	Paignton and Dartmouth Steam Railway	
-		59493	-	BR Green	West Somerset Railway	
-	-	59494	-	Chocolate and Cream	Paignton and Dartmouth Steam Railway	
-	-	59500	-	Green and Cream	Wensleydale Railway	
-	-	59501	-	BR Green	Great Central Railway	Awaiting restoration.
-	-	59503	-	Chocolate and Cream	Paignton and Dartmouth Steam Railway	
-	-	59506	-	BR blue	Great Central Railway	
-	-	59507	-	Chocolate and Cream	Plym Valley Railway	
-	-	59513	-	Chocolate and Cream	Paignton and Dartmouth Steam Railway	
-	-	59514	-	BR Green	Swindon and Cricklade Railway	As of 2025, in storage and for sale.
-	-	59515	-	Blood and Custard	Yeovil Railway Centre	In service.
-	-	59517	-	Chocolate and Cream	Paignton and Dartmouth Steam Railway	In service
-	-	59521	-	Scotrail	Helston Railway	Restoration stalled.
-	-	59522	-	BR Blue and Grey	Chasewater Railway	Scrapped
-	-	59511	-	BR Green	Strathspey Railway	As of 2022, the car is in restoration.
-	51366	-	-	-	-	parts survive
-	-	59505	-	BR Green	Gloucestershire Warwickshire Railway	Under restoration, owned by Cotswold Diesel Railcar Ltd
