= British Rail Class 107 =

Diesel Multiple Unit used in Scotland

British Rail Class 107 (Derby short heavyweight)
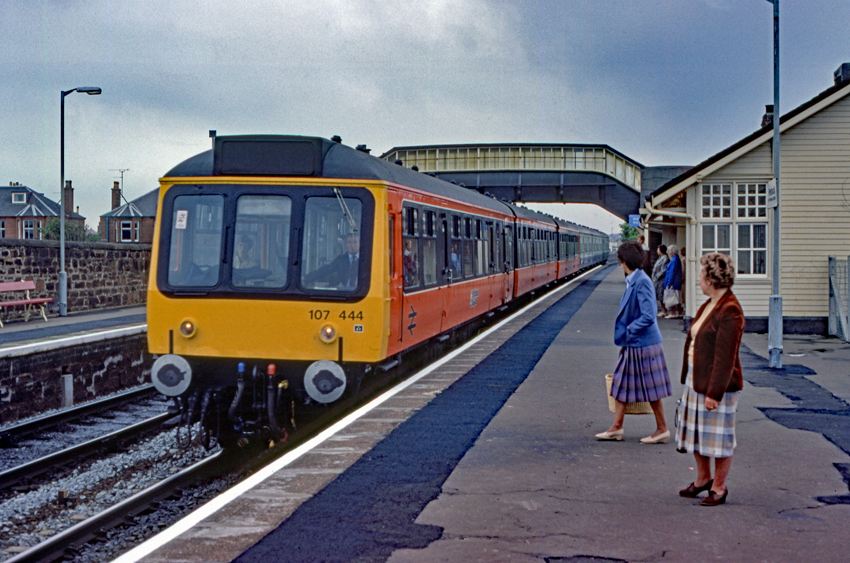
- 107444 in Strathclyde livery at Prestwick
- In service: 1960–1991
- Manufacturer: BR Derby Works
- Built at: Derby Works
- Family name: First generation
- Replaced: Steam locomotives and carriages
- Constructed: 1960
- Number built: 26 sets (78 cars)
- Formation: 3-car sets: DMBS-TSL-DMCL
- Capacity: DMBS: 52 second-class TSL:71 second-class DMCL: 12 first-class, 53 second-class
- Operator: British Rail

Specifications
- Car length: 58 ft 1 in (17.70 m)
- Width: 9 ft 3 in (2.82 m)
- Height: 12 ft 4 in (3.76 m)
- Maximum speed: 70 mph (113 km/h)
- Weight: DMBS: 35.0 tonnes (34.4 long tons; 38.6 short tons); TCL: 28.5 tonnes (28.0 long tons; 31.4 short tons); DMCL: 35.5 tonnes (34.9 long tons; 39.1 short tons)
- Prime mover: Two BUT 6-cylinder diesels per power car
- Power output: 600 bhp (447 kW) per set, 300 bhp (224 kW) per power car, 150 bhp (112 kW) per engine
- Transmission: Mechanical: 4-speed epicyclic gearbox
- Safety system: AWS
- Coupling system: Screw-link, British Standard gangways
- Multiple working: ■ Blue Square
- Track gauge: 1,435 mm (4 ft 8 1/2 in)

The British Rail Class 107 diesel multiple units were built by the Derby Works of British Railways and were introduced in 1960. The class looked similar to the later Class 108 units but were heavier, being built from steel.

== Usage ==
The Class 107s were initially built for suburban workings on the south side of Glasgow and the Class remained in BR's Scottish Region for its service life. When new, a number were used on Dundee/Arbroath services. In later years, they were used almost exclusively on services radiating from Glasgow Central to such destinations as Barrhead, East Kilbride, and Kilmacolm, and—prior to electrification—on Glasgow/Ayrshire services (especially Largs). Most were withdrawn from service by 1991.

Many of the units went into departmental use after being withdrawn from passenger use. The class suffered from a structural problem, however, which could result in the bodies separating from the chassis under heavy braking.

== Orders ==
Lot No.	Car Type	Qty	Fleet number	Notes
30611	Driving Motor Brake Second (DMBS)	26	51985–52010	
30612	Driving Motor Composite with lavatory (DMCL)	26	52011–52036	
30613	Trailer Second with lavatory (TSL)	26	59782–59807	

Originally, there were no fixed set formations, but eventually, sets were numbered as 107425-449 in DMBS order (the DMCLs and TSLs were formed into the sets at random). Renumbered to 107725-749 in 1988 to avoid confusion of set numbers with new Class 156 units which also had 4xx numbers. Renumbered again to 107025-049 about 1990 to avoid similar confusion with new Class 158s numbered in 7xx series.

== Other technical details ==
- Coupling Code: Blue Square
- Transmission: Standard mechanical

For coupling codes see British United Traction

== Preservation ==
Several examples of the class have entered preservation.

Set number	Vehicle numbers			Livery	Location	Notes
Set number	DMBS	TSL	DMCL	Livery	Location	Notes
-	51990	-	-	Strathclyde	Strathspey Railway	Donor of spare parts
-	51993	-	52012	BR Green	Tanat Valley Light Railway	Under Restoration
-	52005	-	52031	BR Green	Tanat Valley Light Railway	Operational
-	52006	-	52025	BR Green	Somerset & Dorset Railway Heritage Trust	Operational
-	52008	-	52030	BR Green	Strathspey Railway	Under Restoration
-	-	-	52029	Strathclyde	Fife Heritage Railway	Purchased from GWR in 2023 and now undergoing restoration.
-	-	59791	-	BR Green	Tanat Valley Light Railway	Static Display
