= Class (locomotive) =

Railroad classification system

A class of locomotives is a group of locomotives built to a common design, typically for a single railroad or railway. Classes can vary between country, manufacturer, and company. For example, the United States generally used the Whyte notation for steam locomotive classification, but the Baldwin Locomotive Works had their own classification system. A list of locomotive classification systems follows:

== United States of America ==
- Whyte notation
- AAR wheel arrangement
- Pennsylvania Railroad locomotive classification
- List of Milwaukee Road locomotives
- List of Norfolk and Western Railway locomotives

== Britain ==
- British Rail locomotive and multiple unit numbering and classification
- List of British Rail classes
- Locomotives of the Caledonian Railway
- Locomotives of the Great Northern Railway
- Locomotives of the Midland Railway
- GWR locomotive numbering and classification
- SR locomotive numbering and classification
- Southern Railway multiple unit numbering and classification
- LMS locomotive numbering and classification
- LNER locomotive numbering and classification
- Steam locomotives of British Railways

== Ireland ==
- Steam locomotives of Ireland
- Diesel locomotives of Ireland
- Multiple units of Ireland

== Germany ==
- List of Bavarian locomotives and railbuses
- German locomotive classification
- DRG locomotive classification
- DR locomotive classification
- DB locomotive classification
- UIC classification of locomotive axle arrangements

== Finland ==
- List of Finnish locomotives

== France ==
- List of SNCF classes

== Indonesia ==
- List of locomotives in Indonesia

== Russia ==
- List of Russian steam locomotive classes

== China ==
- List of locomotives in China

== Switzerland ==
- List of stock used by Swiss Federal Railways
- Swiss locomotive and railcar classification

== South Africa ==
- South African locomotive numbering and classification
- List of South African locomotive classes

== Japan ==
- Japan Railways locomotive numbering and classification

== New Zealand ==
- Locomotives of New Zealand
