= Prussian T 16.1 =

Class of German steam locomotives

Prussia, Alsace-Lorraine T 16.1 DRG Class 94.5–17 DB Class 094, DR Class 94.1 ÖBB Class 694 PKP Class TKw1/TKw2 SNCF 050 TA/TB SNCB Type 98 (36/53)
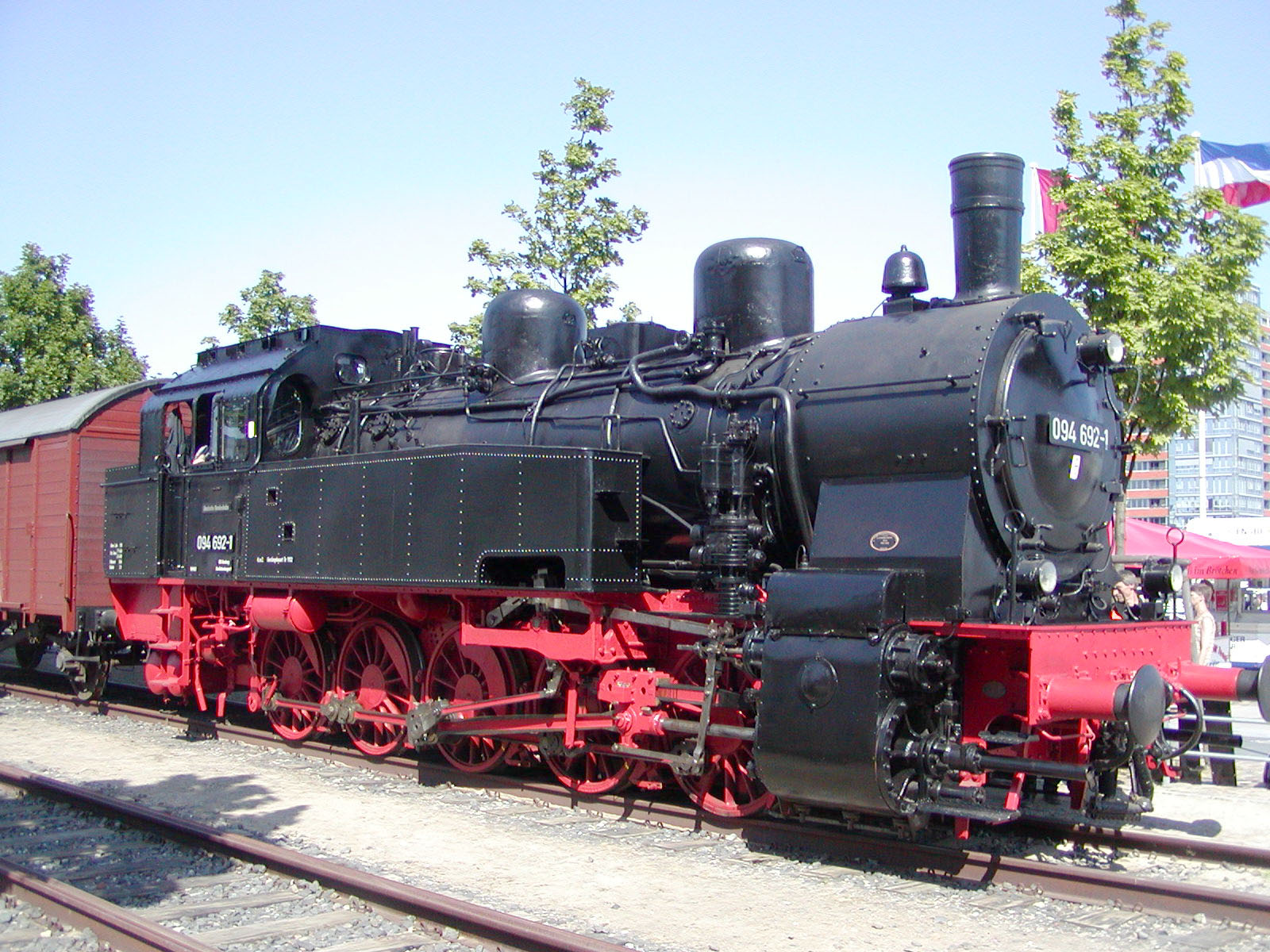
Type and origin
- Builder: BMAG; Grafenstaden; Hanomag; Linke; Henschel & Sohn
- Build date: 1913–1924
- Total produced: 1,242
Specifications
- Configuration
  - Whyte: 0-10-0T
  - German: Gt 55.17
- Gauge: 1,435 mm (4 ft 8 1/2 in) standard gauge
- Driver dia.: 1,350 mm (53 1/8 in)
- Length
  - Over beams: 12,660 mm (41 ft 6 3/8 in)
- Axle load: 17.0 t (16.7 long tons; 18.7 short tons)
- Adhesive weight: 84.9 t (4.8 long tons; 5.4 short tons)
- Service weight: 84.9 t (83.6 long tons; 93.6 short tons)
- Fuel capacity: Coal 3.4 t (3.3 long tons; 3.7 short tons)
- Water cap.: 8,000 litres (1,800 imp gal; 2,100 US gal)
- Boiler pressure: 12 bar (1,200 kPa; 170 psi)
- Heating surface
  - Firebox: 2.30 m^{2} (24.8 sq ft)
  - Radiative: 11.7 m^{2} (126 sq ft)
  - Evaporative: 129.36 m^{2} (1,392.4 sq ft)
- Superheater
  - Heating area: 45.27 m^{2} (487.3 sq ft)
- Cylinders: 2
- Cylinder size: 610 mm (24 in)
- Piston stroke: 660 mm (26 in)
- Valve gear: outside Walschaerts (Heusinger) with Kuhn slide
- Train heating: steam
- Loco brake: automatic, single-stage compressed-air brake
- Auxiliary brake: available
Performance figures
- Maximum speed: 50 km/h (31 mph)
- Indicated power: 787 kW (1,070 PS; 1,055 hp)
Career
- Numbers: DRG 94 502–1740
- Retired: 1974

The Prussian T 16.1 locomotives were built for the Prussian state railways as goods train tank locomotives about the time of the First World War. Six examples were also procured by the Imperial Railways in Alsace-Lorraine.

== History ==
Including follow-on orders by the Deutsche Reichsbahn, a total of 1,242 locomotives were delivered between 1913 and 1924. They were later redesignated as DRG Class 94.5–17 by the DRG in their renumbering plan and were given the numbers 94 502–1380 and 94 1501–1740. Three of the T 16.1 engines belonging to the Imperial Railways in Alsace-Lorraine remained in Germany and were given numbers 94 1378–1380.

As part of the reparations required of Germany after the First World War, 36 went to Belgium (36/53 SNCB Type 98), 21 to the Chemin de fer du Nord (5.505 to 5.525), 19 to the Chemins de fer de Paris à Lyon et à la Méditerranée (5816–5828, later 5.AT.16 to 5.AT.28), four to the Railways of the Saarland (8101–8104, which went into the Deutsche Reichsbahn in 1935 as 94 1381 to 94 1384) and two to Italy (FS 897). In addition, 37 were given to the Polish State Railway, where they were designated the TKw1. Some of these locomotives were given the Reichsbahn numbers 94 1385–1416 in the Second World War. After 1945 several former French and Belgian locomotives were left with the Deutsche Reichsbahn in East Germany as numbers 94 1801–1810. In addition, in 1950, another T 16.1 from the Halberstadt-Blankenburg Railway was acquired and numbered as 94 6776.

Poland received over 100 locomotives after World War II, and these were classified as TKw2.

On the introduction of the new DB renumbering scheme in 1968 the Deutsche Bundesbahn locomotives were redesignated as Class 094; the DR renumbering scheme of 1970 saw the DR in East Germany reclassifying its engines as Class 94.1.

In addition to heavy shunting and line duties the locomotives were also employed on steep lines such as the Friedbergbahn (Suhl–Schleusingen), Scheldetalbahn (Dillenburg-Gönnern), Rennsteigbahn (Ilmenau–Schleusingen), the Erkrath–Hochdahl ramp and the Murgtalbahn (Rastatt–Freudenstadt). For such duties the steam engines were equipped with Riggenbach counter-pressure brakes. The great success of this class on inclines made it possible to do away with fiddly and time-consuming rack railway operations on many ramps.

In the Bundesbahn the last examples of this class were retired in 1974. In the Reichsbahn they were withdrawn even later. They were replaced in ramp duties by rebuilt diesel locomotives of Class 118.

A total of 43 representatives of Class 94.5–17 remained after the Second World War in Austria. The majority were handed over to the MÀV in Hungary or SŽD. The remaining 14 units were retained as ÖBB Class 694. The locomotives of this class were mainly used in heavy pusher service and retired by 1966 or sold to steel works as industrial locomotives.

== Preserved locomotives ==
Several locomotives of this class have been preserved, some of which are still working, including numbers 94 1292 and 94 1538 shown in the photographs. In Austria the oldest preserved member of the class, 94 503, later renumbered to 694.503 is preserved at the ÖGEG's locomotive park at Ampflwang, but still awaiting restoration.

== Gallery ==
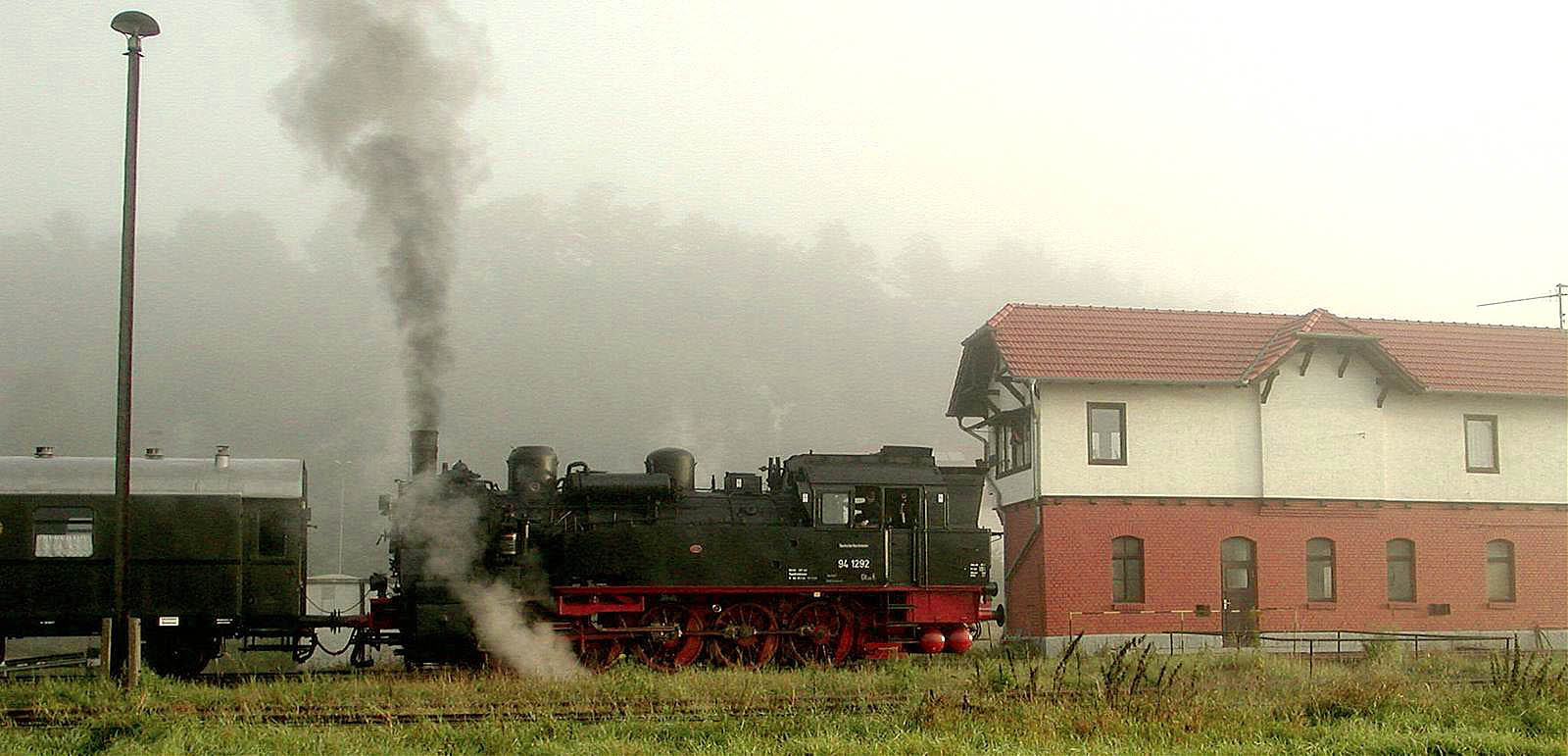
94 1292 in Grimmenthal

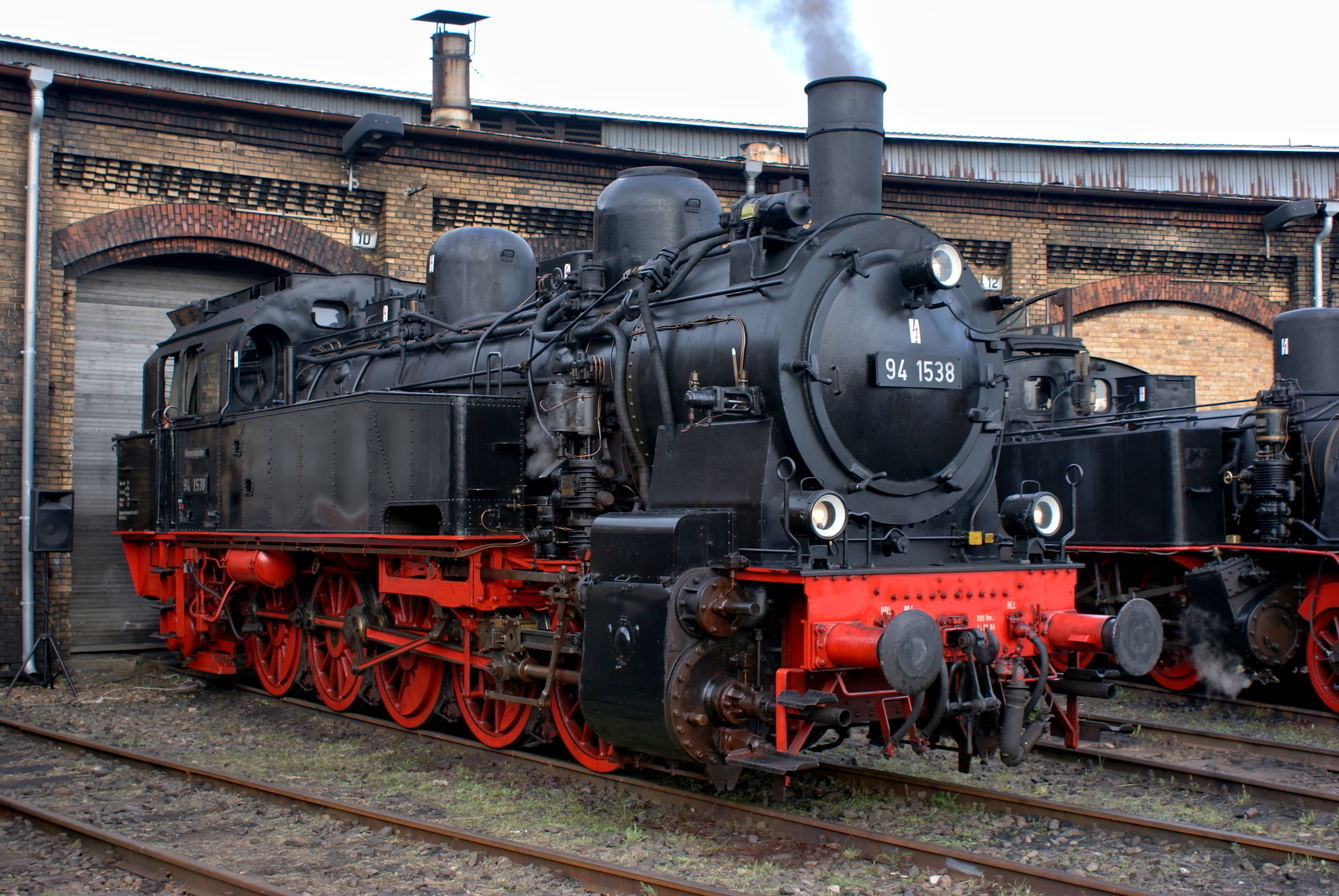
Dampflokomotive 94 1538 Bw Berlin-Schöneweide

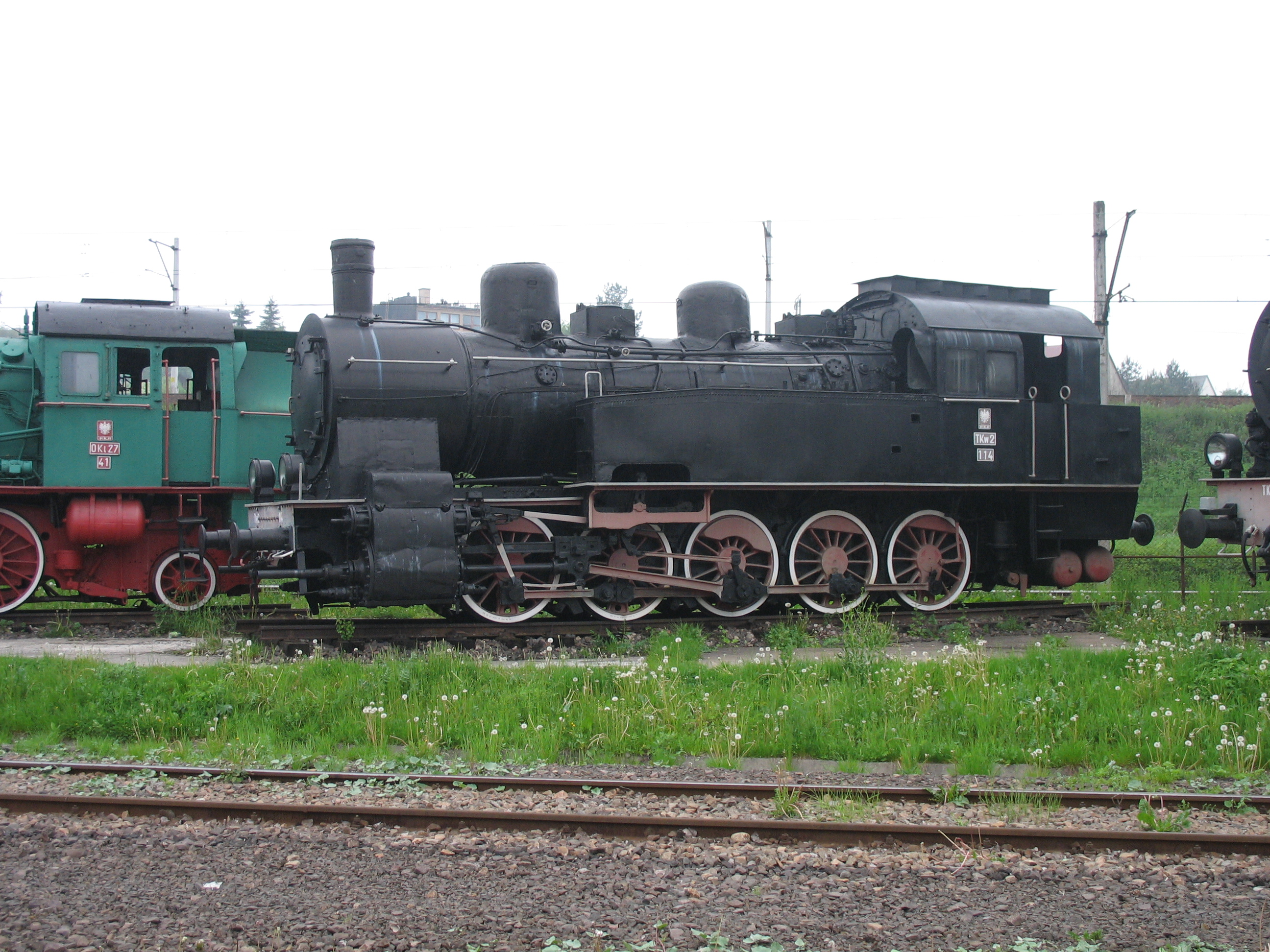
TKw2-114 in Chabówka

== See also ==
- List of DRG locomotives and railcars
- List of Prussian locomotives and railbuses
- List of preserved steam locomotives in Germany
