= British Rail locomotive and multiple unit numbering and classification =

Numbering and classification system

A number of different numbering and classification schemes were used for locomotives and multiple units operated by British Railways (BR), and this page explains the principal systems. This section also covers the post-privatisation period, as the broad numbering and classification arrangements have not altered since the break-up of BR.

Locomotives and multiple units (the majority being self-propelled) have frequently had similar arrangements for classification and numbering, so are considered together here.

== Constituent companies ==
In 1948, BR inherited a variety of locomotives and multiple units from the Big Four railway companies and some smaller concerns. Details of the numbering and classification systems used by the Big Four companies are covered in the following pages:

- Great Western Railway: GWR locomotive numbering and classification
- Southern Railway: SR locomotive numbering and classification and SR multiple unit numbering and classification
- London, Midland and Scottish Railway: LMS locomotive numbering and classification
- London and North Eastern Railway: LNER locomotive numbering and classification

In the main, new locomotives and multiple units built by BR to pre-nationalisation designs were numbered and classified according to the principles applied by the relevant Big Four company.

== 1948 numbering and classification ==
Immediately after nationalisation, BR had to decide how to number and classify the stock it had inherited from the Big Four companies, and how newly built stock would be included. In the main, it decided to simply adapt what was already there.

=== Locomotives ===
The classification systems of the Big Four were left unchanged for the inherited locomotives. However, BR decided to adopt the LMS power classification system as its preferred model and all inherited locomotives received a classification in this series as well as their traditional classification.

In order to remove the duplications of locomotive numbers, all locomotives were placed into a new number series as follows:

Range	Description	Renumbering
1-9999	Ex-GWR steam locomotives	Numbers unchanged
10000-19999	Diesel and gas turbine locomotives	Without reference to previous number, except pioneer mainline locos LMS 10000/10001, whose numbers were unchanged
20000-29999	Electric locomotives	SR CC1-3 to 20001-3, LNER 6000 to 26000, others without reference to previous number
30000-39999	Ex-SR steam locomotives (except Isle of Wight (Note: Isle of Wight locomotives retained their existing numbers in a separate series commencing at W1, and locomotives transferred to the island by BR were renumbered into that series - and vice versa for those returned to the mainland.))	Addition of 30000, except: C1 etc. to 33xxx, 21C101 etc. to 34xxx, 21C1 etc. to 35xxx, 3xxx series renumbered without reference to previous number
40000-59999	Ex-LMS steam locomotives	Addition of 40000, except 2xxxx series renumbered without reference to previous number into the 58xxx series
60000-69999	Ex-LNER steam locomotives	Addition of 60000, except 10000 to 60700
70000-79999	BR-design tender steam locomotives	New Build
80000-89999	BR-design tank steam locomotives	New Build
90000-99999	BR & War Department large freight locomotives	ex-War Department locos renumbered without reference to previous number

This approach meant that the numbering arrangements adopted by the pre-Nationalisation companies were retained in the new system, and new locomotives built to the designs of the old companies were numbered appropriately in their series. Locomotives inherited from smaller concerns were numbered in the most appropriate regional list, e.g. ex-East Kent Railway stock utilised blank numbers in the 3xxxx ex-SR series.

The new series for diesel, petrol, gas and electric locomotives were arranged as follows:

Range	Description
10xxx	Mainline diesel locomotives
11xxx	Diesel-mechanical & diesel-hydraulic shunters (British Railways orders)
12xxx	Ex-LMS shunters 300 hp (224 kW) and over
13xxx	Diesel electric shunters (British Railways orders) (Note: Number 13000 was initially allocated to a 250 hp (186 kW) ex-LMS shunter, but this locomotive was withdrawn before being renumbered.)
150xx	Ex-LNER shunters
151xx	Ex-GWR shunters
152xx	Ex-SR shunters
18xxx	Gas turbine locomotives
20xxx	Ex-SR electric locomotives
26xxx	Ex-LNER electric locomotives
27xxx	Express passenger electric locomotives

=== Modern traction ===
Numbering of electric multiple units was undertaken on a regional basis, with each region having its own series commencing from 001. Most diesel multiple units were not allocated unit numbers, though in later years numbers were allocated on a regional basis in the Scottish and Western regions, and by individual depots elsewhere. For more details on these series, see British Rail Regional Multiple Unit Numbering.

To classify electric stock, a two-letter prefix was used to indicate what type it was, followed by a number issued sequentially from 1 (e.g. EM1). This was a system adapted from that used by the LNER for its electric stock). The additional prefixes used were:

- AL: AC electric locomotive
- AM: AC electric multiple unit

The Eastern and North Eastern regions used a series of different classifications for diesel locomotives. The first method was also adapted from the old LNER system, and applied only to diesel shunters operating on those regions. It comprised a prefix, indicating the transmission type and wheel arrangement, followed by a number allocated sequentially from 1. The prefixes used were:

- DEJ: Diesel-electric, 0-6-0 wheel arrangement
- DJ: Diesel-mechanical or hydraulic, 0-6-0 wheel arrangement
- DY: Diesel-mechanical or hydraulic, 0-4-0 wheel arrangement

The second classification system was developed in 1955 and applied to all types then in existence on British Rail. It was based on the format Dx/y, where x was the power of the locomotive in hundreds of horsepower and y was a number allocated sequentially to specific types (e.g. D1/1 would be a shunter with a 100 to 199 hp (75 to 148 kW) rating, D33/1 would be a Type 5 locomotive). The series was extensively re-arranged in 1962 in a somewhat confusing way, but following the same basic principles.

The Southern Region followed existing numbering (for its multiple units) and classification systems (for both multiple units and locomotives) inherited from the SR. The EMU classification system (e.g. 4SUB) was also extended to include their diesel-electric multiple units, but with a single letter. Locomotives were given a two-letter code, with the second letter indicating detail differences within the main type. For instance, what were to become Class 33 locomotives from 1973, were Class KA or KB depending on whether they were the standard design or that fitted for push-pull working with 4TC units.

== 1957 numbering and classification ==
In the early period of British Railways, steam locomotion had continued to be of prime importance. Apart from a growing selection of diesel shunters, there had been almost no development of mainline diesel or electric traction beyond the few locomotives ordered by the Big Four companies.

The 1955 Modernisation Plan heralded big changes in this situation, and from 1957 a new numbering system was used for diesel and electric locomotives ordered by British Railways, including those shunters ordered before 1957, which were renumbered into the new system. All steam and gas-turbine locomotives, and diesel and electric locomotives built to pre-nationalisation orders retained their existing numbers under the 1948 arrangements, though some had a 'D' or 'E' prefix added to their number in error.

=== Diesel locomotives ===
The numbering system matched up the new 'Type' classification that had been adopted for diesel traction, and which was based on the power of the locomotive. The broad categories were as follows:

Range	Type	Engine power
D1-D1999	Type 4	2000 to 2999 hp
D2000-D2999	Shunters	Under 300 hp
D3000-D4999	Shunters	300 to 799 hp
D5000-D6499	Type 2	1001 to 1499 hp
D6500-D7999	Type 3	1500 to 1999 hp
D8000-D8999	Type 1	800 to 1000 hp
D9000-D9999	Type 5	Over 3000 hp

Of the shunters that were renumbered, the only transparent renumbering was for those that had been numbered in the 13xxx series, for which the '1' was simply replaced with a 'D'. All the others were completely renumbered to separate out the different classes.

As always, there were some oddities. The 650 hp diesel hydraulic locomotives later Class 14 were numbered from D9500 upwards. When the Type 2 series got too crowded later on, new Sulzer Type 2 locomotives (later class 25) were numbered from D7500 upwards. Some experimental locomotives carried D0xxx numbers.

When the last mainline steam locomotive was withdrawn in August 1968 (leaving only three on the self-contained narrow gauge Vale of Rheidol Railway), the 'D' prefix was dropped.

=== Electric locomotives ===
The numbering system was divided into two series, one for AC locomotives and one for DC locomotives. DC locomotives were numbered from E5000 upwards, and DC electro-diesel locomotives, with a diesel generator for working off electrified lines, were numbered from E6000 upwards.

For AC locomotives, the first number was to be an indication of power. For example, if the power was in the range 2000 to 2999 hp, it would be numbered between E2000-E2999, and so on. In fact, apart from E2001 (the prototype AC locomotive, converted from a gas turbine locomotive, later Class 80), all AC locomotives were numbered from E3001 upwards. When new 5000 hp locomotives were under construction (later Class 87), these were allocated numbers from E3201 upwards, though they never carried these numbers as the 1973 arrangements were already in place by the time the first one was built.

== 1973 numbering and classification - TOPS ==
At the end of the 1960s, British Rail adopted the Total Operations Processing System (TOPS), a computerised system developed by IBM, the Southern Pacific Transportation Company and Stanford University in the United States. All types of locomotive received a TOPS classification, and multiple units were later included according to this broad division:

Class	Allocation
(0)xx	Locomotives and Ships (leading zero was ignored)
1xx	Diesel-Mechanical (including hydraulic) Multiple Units
2xx	Diesel-Electric Multiple Units
3xx	AC and Multi-Voltage Electric Multiple Units
4xx	Southern Region DC Electric Multiple Units
5xx	Other DC Electric Multiple Units
9xx	Departmental (non-revenue earning) Multiple Units

From late 1970, British Rail started to apply new numbers to locomotives and multiple units based on the TOPS classification system, the first classes to be dealt with being the LNER-design EM1 type (TOPS class 76) and the AL3 and AL4 types of AC electric locomotives (TOPS classes 83 and 84). The format of these numbers is xxxyyy, where xxx is the class number and yyy the unique identifier for that locomotive or unit. All locomotive classes have unique identifiers that commence at xx001, except classes 43 (High Speed Train power cars, originally classified as multiple-unit vehicles), 97 and 98 (departmental and steam locomotives). Multiple unit classes are treated differently, because an attempt has been made to give units working within the same region or sector unique identifiers (for more information see British Rail Regional Multiple Unit Numbering). In recent years, unit numbers have also been tied in with the numbers of the carriages within a unit (e.g. 150201 is formed of carriages 52201 and 57201). As a result, very few multiple unit classes commence from xxx001.

Where there are variations within a class, subclasses are used in the format xxx/y. When the main renumbering scheme was published in 1973, many sub-classes were redesignated to better align the locomotives to be numbered in that sub-class with the sub-class number. Thus, class 47 was originally divided into sub-classes 47/1 (locomotives fitted with steam-heating equipment), 47/2 (not fitted with train-heating equipment) and 47/3 (fitted with electric train-heating equipment), but in 1973 these sub-classes were redesignated 47/0, 47/3 and 47/4. Usually, the subclass is connected to the first digit of the unique identifier, so that the first locomotive in subclass 47/3 was 47301. However, some caution is required on this point for the following reasons:

- Where there are more than 100 examples in a subclass the identifier becomes obscured, e.g. 31201 is in subclass 31/1, which runs from 31101 to 31327.
- Some classes renumbered from the 1957 arrangements simply had consecutive numbers from xx001, which ignored the subclasses identified, e.g. 25033 was in subclass 25/1.
- Where numbers within a class became congested, it wasn't always possible to make the connection, e.g. locomotives in subclass 47/2 were fitted with Green Circle multiple-working equipment but retained their original numbers. In other cases it wasn't possible to start from xxxy01, e.g. subclass 08/9 started from 08991 because subclass 08/0 ran from 08001 to 08958.
- Because of the different arrangements for numbering multiple units (see above), subclasses may have no link to the unique identifier at all; this is especially true on the Southern Region. Sometimes, where there is a principal run of units and a small variant subclass, the majority will be subclass xxx/0 whatever their identifier, but the variant's subclass does reflect the identifier, e.g. Subclass 302/0 for the standard passenger units (302201-312) and 302/9 for the postal units (302990-302993).

So far as renumbering from the 1957 arrangements was concerned, most locomotives retained the last two digits of their number, though some classes were renumbered without reference to their previous numbers. This was usually where sub-classes had already been or were in the process of being created (for example classes 45 and 47, in which some members were being fitted with electric train heating equipment, and 86, subject to various modifications, mainly to the suspension). The other exception was if the first locomotive of a class had carried a number ending in "00" under the 1957 arrangements, because TOPS could not handle numbers ending in "00". These were either renumbered at the end of the class (e.g. the prototype class 50 D400 became 50050), or took a vacant number of another class member that had already been withdrawn (e.g. prototype class 24 D5000 became 24005, D5005 having been withdrawn in 1969), or were renumbered at the end of a sub-group within the class. Class 20 was particularly complicated in this respect. The class had been built in batches between 1957 and 1967 and all 228 members were still in service when the TOPS renumbering scheme was drawn up, but instead of class prototype D8000 being renumbered 20228 at the end of the class (which was not divided into sub-classes) it became 20050, displaced D8050 became 20128, and D8128 in turn became 20228.

The situation was different for multiple units. Where unit numbers were carried, they were usually three-digit already. TOPS simply prefixed these existing unit numbers with the newly allocated TOPS class number. The process was more complicated on the Southern Region, which used four-digit unit numbers and where a more general unit renumbering was required so that the first number of the unit coincided with the last digit of the class number. Many diesel multiple units were not kept in regular formations, so did not have existing unit numbers, and this situation was not changed under TOPS (except following refurbishment).

The TOPS system has been perpetuated by the privatisation of British Rail, though the allocation of classes and numbers appears to have become more random and less governed by the rules followed by British Rail (but even they made exceptions). See British Carriage and Wagon Numbering and Classification for an explanation of how TOPS applied also to carriages and wagons.

Please Note: This section explains the successful application of TOPS to multiple unit stock, the arrangement that persists today. However, there was an earlier attempt to apply TOPS that differed from the arrangement set out below. More details about the first arrangement may be found here.

=== Locomotives ===
The series of locomotive classes were allocated according to the following pattern:

Class	Allocation
01-69	Diesel locomotives (excluding second use of class 70)
70-79	DC electric and electro-diesel locomotives (including first use of class 70)
80-96	AC and multi-voltage electric locomotives (including first use of class 89)
89	Heritage diesel and electric locomotives (second use of class)
97	Departmental (non-revenue earning) locomotives
98	Steam locomotives
99	Ships

The following table shows in more detail how the classification of diesel locomotives was overlaid on the 1957 classification by Type:

Class	Type	Horsepower	Previous number range
01-07	Shunters	Under 300	D2000-D2999
08-13	Shunters	300 – 799	D3000-D4999
14-20	Type 1	650 – 1000	D8000-D8999/D9500-D9999
21-32	Type 2	1001–1499	D5000-D6499/D7500-D7999
33-39	Type 3	1500–1999	D6500-D7499
40-54	Type 4	2000–2999	D1-D1999
55-69	Type 5	Over 3000	D9000-D9499

AC electric locomotive classes AL1 to AL6 became 81-86 in order. Class 01 was subsequently reused to register any ex-industrial/Ministry of Defence shunters used on the national network regardless of horsepower.

=== Multiple units ===
The multiple unit series were divided up as follows:

Class	Type	
100-114	Diesel-Mechanical/Hydraulic	'Low Density' passenger units (i.e. few doors per carriage) - mostly short (57'0") frame, but Class 114 are long
115-127	Diesel-Mechanical/Hydraulic	Mixture of 'High Density' (i.e. doors to every seating bay) and 'Cross-Country' (long distance) passenger units - long (63'6") frame
128-131	Diesel-Mechanical/Hydraulic	Parcels units - mostly long frame, but Class 129 are short
140-144	Diesel-Mechanical/Hydraulic	Second generation railbus (4-wheel) units (Pacers)
150-199	Diesel-Mechanical/Hydraulic	Second generation bogie units (Sprinters, Networkers, Turbostars, Coradias, Desiros & Civitys)
200-207	Diesel-Electric	First generation units
210-249	Diesel-Electric	Second generation units
250-299	Diesel-Electric	Express units
300-312	AC Electric	First generation units
313-369	AC Electric	Second generation units
370-399	AC Electric	Express units since the privatisation of British Rail (Electrostars, Desiros, Pendolinos, Hitachi A-trains & Civitys)
920-935	Departmental units	Southern Region departmental units
936-939	Departmental units	Other departmental electric multiple units
950-960	Departmental units	Other departmental diesel multiple units (since the privatisation of British Rail, this series has included electric multiple units)

AC electric multiple units AM1-AM11 became 301-311 in order (in fact the AM1 units had already been withdrawn, so Class 301 was never actually used). The 1xx and 2xx series were originally arranged so that driving motors, driving trailers and trailer cars all had their own individual class numbers (presumably because these units were more prone to being reformed), but this was subsequently revised so that each type of unit had a single class number, as allocated to the driving motor car.

Whereas within most ranges class numbers were allocated sequentially as new types were constructed, the Southern Region adopted a more complicated system for their electric multiple units, with the second and third digits indicating in more detail the type of unit. Second digits were allocated as follows:

Class	Type
40x	Southern Railway-designed units
41x	1950s British Railways-designed units
42x	1960s British Railways-designed units
43x	1967 Bournemouth Electrification units
44x	1970s British Railways-designed units
45x	1980s British Railways-designed units
46x	1990s Networkers
48x	London Underground ('Tube'-sized) units (also temporary formations and Gatwick Express units)
49x	Unpowered trailer units (later 4x8)

Third digits were allocated as follows:

Class	Type
4x0	Express units with buffet (later 4x2)
4x1	Express units
4x3	Four-car outer-suburban units
4x4	Two-car outer-suburban units
4x5	Four-car inner-suburban units
4x6	Two/three-car inner-suburban units
4x7	Special purpose units (e.g. first Gatwick Express units)
4x9	Single car units

Of course, many exceptions arose over time. One major change was to change the classification of unpowered trailer units from 49x numbers to 4x8 numbers (which involved reclassifying Class 491 to Class 438). When Southern Region unit numbers were changed to fit with the TOPS classification system, former 4x0 classes were all reclassified to 4x2. This was necessary because Southern Region units only displayed the last four digits of their six-digit TOPS number, and it was decided that no painted unit number should commence with a '0'. It is worth noting that despite only showing the last four digits, the actual number of the unit was still the six-digit TOPS number. This often causes confusion both to enthusiasts and those outside the field alike.

== 2011 numbering and classification alterations and extensions - TOPS ==
In September 2011, the UK Rail Safety and Standards Board issued Railway Group Standard GM/RT2453, which made some alterations to the TOPS classes allocated to various types of locomotive and multiple unit - primarily extending the number ranges for certain types of locomotives and multiple units where the previous allocation ranges were becoming exhausted. The standard also provided for the allocation of European Vehicle Numbers to most mainline rail vehicles in Britain, as part of the implementation of EC Directive 2008/57/EC (the Railway Interoperability Directive). Allocations made prior to the introduction of the GM/RT2453 standard were not changed.

Railway Group Standard GM/RT2453 was superseded in December 2017 by Rail Industry Standard RIS-2453-RST, which introduced the requirement for all new rail vehicles receiving authorisation to enter service in Britain after 1 January 2018 to display their full 12-digit European Vehicle Number regardless of whether or not the vehicle is intended for use only on domestic services. Allocations made prior to the introduction of the RIS-2453-RST standard were not changed.

The RIS-2453-RST allocation ranges are as follows:

=== Locomotives ===
Vehicle Type	UIC Type Code	Class Allocation
Diesel shunting locomotives	98	01–09
Electric shunting locomotives	97	01–09 and 80–96 (Note: Electric shunting locomotives do not have their own range and may be allocated from the diesel shunting locomotive or the electric locomotive ranges.)
Diesel locomotives	92	10–79 (Note: Although InterCity 125 power cars are commonly described as being Class 43 diesel locomotives, the standard treats them as belonging to diesel multiple units for the purposes of vehicle numbering.)
Electric locomotives	91	80–96
Existing electro-diesel locomotives	91	73 only
Heritage locomotives	90	98 only
Unallocated	—	97 and 99 (Note: Class 99 has subsequently been allocated to a fleet of bi-mode locomotives ordered in 2022.)

=== Multiple units and fixed-formation sets ===
Unit Type	Class Allocation
Diesel-mechanical and diesel-hydraulic multiple-unit sets	100–199
Diesel-electric multiple-unit sets	200–299
AC and AC/DC electric multiple-unit sets	300–399 and 700–749
DC electric multiple-unit sets	400–599
Multiple-unit sets powered by diesel and/or other fuels	600–699
Multi-mode (Note: A multi-mode unit is one with two or more sources of traction power, at least one of which is external.) multiple-unit sets	750–799
High-speed (Note: A high-speed unit is one capable of operating at speeds above 190 kilometres per hour (120 mph).) multiple-unit / fixed-formation sets	800–899
Infrastructure maintenance and other non-passenger multiple-unit / fixed-formation sets	900–999

== See also ==
For further information on individual classes of locomotive or multiple unit, see these pages:

- List of British Rail classes
- Steam locomotives of British Railways
- Locomotives of the Great Western Railway
- Locomotives of the Southern Railway
- Locomotives of the London, Midland and Scottish Railway
- Locomotives of the London and North Eastern Railway
- British electric multiple units
- British railcars and diesel multiple units

Related pages on BR numbering and classification include:

- British Rail TOPS first arrangement
- British Rail Regional Multiple Unit Numbering
- British Carriage and Wagon Numbering and Classification
- Route availability
