= British Rail TOPS first arrangement =

At the end of the 1960s, British Railways adopted the Total Operations Processing System (TOPS), a computerised system developed by the Southern Pacific Railroad in the United States. All types of locomotive and multiple unit received a TOPS classification, but the first attempt at applying TOPS was soon modified. This page explains the first attempt at using TOPS and cross-refers the classes allocated with those adopted in the successful re-arrangement. An explanation of the final arrangements for TOPS classification may be found here.

== Locomotives ==
The first attempt to apply TOPS differed from the latter approach in two significant ways:

- xx/0 was not a valid subclass number. When the second arrangement was applied, original subclasses xx/1 became xx/0, xx/2 became xx/1 and so on.
- Some detail differences within classes were considered sufficient for a different class number to be allocated, rather than indicate it with a subclass. In addition, there are a number of cases where conversions led to complete reclassification, where similar circumstances later would be indicated simply by allocating a new subclass. The change in approach led to some odd gaps in the list of locomotive classes when they were re-arranged, as the principal class numbers were retained unaltered. Classes affected by this change in approach include:
  - Class 29 (re-engined Class 21)
  - Class 31 (re-engined Class 30)
  - Class 34 (became Class 33/1)
  - Class 43 (North British Locomotive-built Class 42 with different make of engine and torque-converter)
  - Class 48 (Class 47 with experimental Sulzer vee-formation engine; later rebuilt to standard class 47 with in-line twin-bank engine)
  - Class 72 (became Class 73/0)

== Diesel Multiple Units ==
The first attempt to apply TOPS to diesel multiple units saw each carriage within a unit being allocated its own unique class number. This was probably because most DMUs were not kept in permanent formations. Classes were allocated according to the following division:

100-131: Driving Motor cars
140-150: Driving Trailer cars
160-190: Trailer cars
201-203: DEMU Driving Motor cars
211-212: DEMU Driving Trailer cars
221-225: DEMU Trailer cars
    251: Express DEMU Driving Motor cars
    261: Express DEMU Trailer cars

However, this arrangement was later revised so that each unit adopted the class number previously given just to the main type of Driving Motor car (the exception being the DEMU units, which were completely changed). The table below cross-references the old and new TOPS classes:

First TOPS	Second TOPS	First TOPS	Second TOPS	First TOPS	Second TOPS	First TOPS	Second TOPS
102	101	106	105	140	104	141	105
142	108	143	100	144	101	145	103
146	109	147	111	148	114	149	121
150	122	160	104	161	107 & 108	162	101
163	110	164	101	165	111	166	104
167	108	168	101 & 111	169	104	170	105
171	101	172	116	173	115	174	118
175	116	176	117	177	115	178	119
179	120	180	124	181	124	182	123
183	123	184	123	185	125	186	127
187	126	188	126	189	126	190	130
201/1	201	201/2	202	201/3	203	202/1	206
202/2	207	202/3	205	203	204	211/1	206
211/2	207	211/3	205	212	204	221/1	201
221/2	202	221/3	203	222/1	206	222/2	205
223/1	201	223/2	202	223/3	203	224	207
225	203	261	251				

== Electric Multiple Units ==
The first attempt to apply TOPS to the Southern Region's fleet of electric multiple units, saw classes being allocated according to the following division:

- 40x: Southern Railway designed units
- 41x: 1951-type British Railways designed units
- 42x: 1957-type British Railways designed units
- 43x: 1963-type British Railways designed units
- 44x: 1967-type British Railways designed units
- 45x: Underground ('Tube'-sized) units
- 46x: 1971-type British Railways designed units

In comparison with the later re-arrangement, the types that were different were given the same class (e.g. the single-car luggage vans) and identified only by subclass, while those that were later treated as variations of the same class, were separated according to their construction period (e.g. early or late 1950s builds). When the new arrangement was applied, 40x classes were left untouched, but the others were changed as follows:

SR code	First TOPS	Second TOPS
4-EPB	411	415/1
2-HAP	412	414/1 & 414/2
2-EPB	413	416
4-CEP	414/1	411/1
4-BEP	414/2	410/1
4-CEP	421/1	411/2

SR code	First TOPS	Second TOPS
4-BEP	421/2	410/2
MLV	422/1	419
TLV	422/2	499
4-EPB	423	415/2
2-HAP	424	414/3
4-CIG	431/1	421

SR code	First TOPS	Second TOPS
4-BIG	431/2	420
4-VEP & 8-VAB	432	423 & 480
4-REP	441	430
3-TC	442/1	492
4-TC	442/2	491

SR code	First TOPS	Second TOPS
3-TIS	451	486
4-VEC	452	485
WC	453	487
2-PEP	461	446
4-PEP	462	445
