= DRG Class E 18 =

Class of German electric locomotives

DRG Class E 18 DB Class 118, DR Class 218 ÖBB 1018/1118
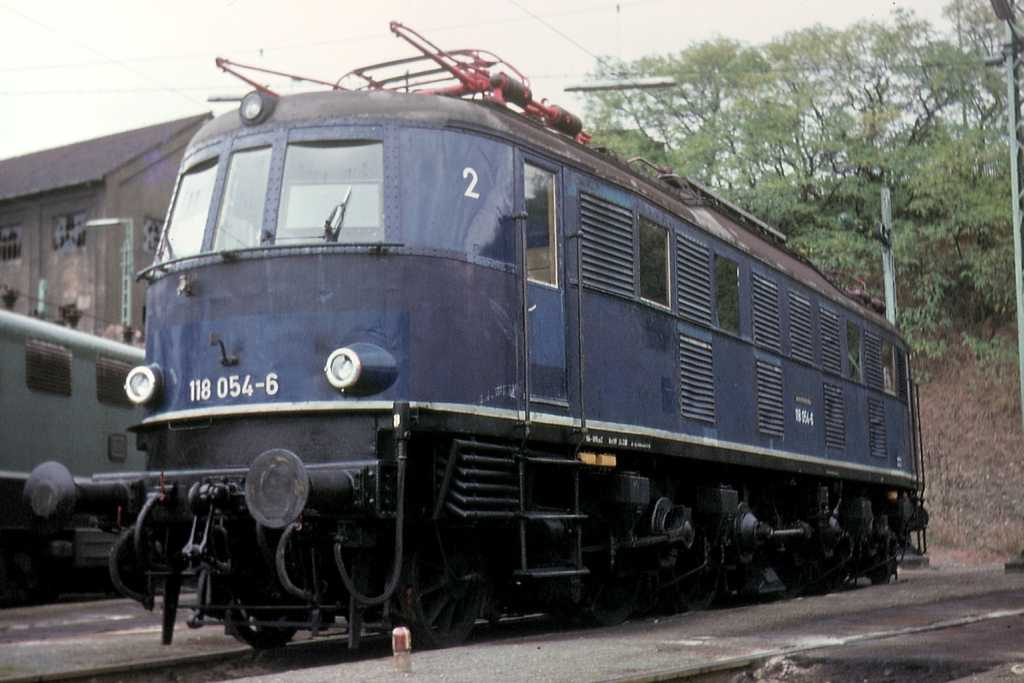
- 118 054 in Bw Würzburg, 1983
Type and origin
- Builder: AEG, Krupp, Lokomotivfabrik Floridsdorf
- Build date: 1935−1939 (61 locomotives); 1954−1955 (2 locomotives)
- Total produced: 63
Specifications
- Configuration
  - UIC: 1′Do1′
- Gauge: 1,435 mm (4 ft 8 1/2 in)
- Length
  - Over beams: 16,920 mm (55 ft 6 in)
- Axle load: 18.1 t (17.8 long tons; 20.0 short tons)
- Service weight: 108.5 t (106.8 long tons; 119.6 short tons)
- Electric system/s: 15 kV 16 2/3 Hz AC Catenary
- Current pickup: Pantograph
- Traction motors: 4
- Transmission: Helical spring gear
- Running step switch: Camshaft controller with secondary transformer and precision regulator
- Train heating: Electric
- Loco brake: HikssbrmZ Compressed air brake; both sides of driving and carrying wheels
- Train protection: Sifa/Indusi
Performance figures
- Maximum speed: 150 km/h (93 mph)
- Power output
  - 1 hour: 3,040 kW (4,080 hp)
  - Continuous: 2,840 kW (3,810 hp)
- Power index: 28.0 kW/t
- Tractive effort
  - Starting: 206 kN (46,000 lb_{f})
Career
- Numbers: DRG E 18 01–44, E 18 045-053, E 18 201-208; DB E 18 054–055
- Retired: 1984 (DB)/1991 (DR)

The Deutsche Reichsbahn-Gesellschaft (DRG) Class E 18 is a class of electric locomotives built in Germany and Austria between 1935 and 1955. With exception of Class E 19 it was Deutsche Reichsbahn's fastest electric locomotive. After 1945 most of the surviving locomotives were operated by Deutsche Bundesbahn (DB), although a few passed to Deutsche Reichsbahn (DR) and Österreichische Bundesbahnen (ÖBB).

In addition to the 55 locomotives built in Germany, a further 8 locomotives of a modified design were built in Austria in 1939 as Class E 18.2 (later ÖBB class 1018).

== Development ==
Electric traction passenger services in Germany dates back to the year 1881, when the first public line was taken into service in Berlin. Despite successful test runs with three-phase current electric railcars up to a top speed of 210 km/h (130 mph) in 1903, the German state railways decided to use single-phase alternating current because the overhead line of three-phase current was very complicated. (Note: Until the late second half of the 20th century it was not possible to convert AC to three-phase current inside the locomotive, the overhead lines had to comprise at least two wires (if the tracks were used for the third phase). This very complicated systems was only invented in Italy, because most railways weighed the high installation and maintenance costs higher than the advantages of the smaller and easier to maintain three-phase motors. This has recently changed, as today's electronics allow the transformation inside the loco without excessive weight or space needed.) The first mainline electric locomotives were all equipped with large, slow-going single electric motors.

Obviously the large single engines and the resulting power transmission by connecting rods made for poor operation characteristics at high speed. Nevertheless, it was not before 1913 that first electric main line locomotives with nose-suspended, fast-going single motors were commissioned. This development was further delayed by World War I. The decisive breakthrough was finally made in the 1920s, as large numbers of electric trainsets were developed for the electrification of the Berlin Stadtbahn in 1928. Accordingly, also in 1928 the first Class E 17 electric main line express locomotive entered service.

Class E 17 was a huge success, with a total of 38 units produced. The smaller Class E 04 was derived for lighter service in the less mountainous middle German regions. However, during the mid-1930s DRG decided to speed up its express train services over the 120 km/h (75 mph) that Class E 17 was admitted for. (Note: This is true not only for electric services: DRG's standard steam main line express Class 01, commissioned in 1926, was capable of an operating speed of 130 km/h (81 mph). In order to increase operating speed, the stronger and streamlined Class 01.10 with a top speed of 150 km/h (93 mph) was developed during the mid-1930s and commissioned 1939.) The newly developed Class E 18's basic layout was accordingly based on Class E 17. (Note: It was not until Class E 44 successfully proved the concept of an electric locomotive with drive wheels only that DRG had the heart to abandon the design of leading idler wheels for fast locomotives.) The electric design was based on the newer Class E 04. With respect to the higher speeds new class E 18's shape was streamlined. The Class E 18 was capable of operating a 935-tonne (920-long-ton; 1,031-short-ton) train at 140 km/h (87 mph) on level track, and up to 360 tonnes (350 long tons; 400 short tons) at 75 km/h (47 mph) on a 2% gradient. Another innovation was that the Class E 18 was the first electric locomotive with an engineer's seat. Earlier models were operated standing.

== Service ==
=== Deutsche Reichsbahn-Gesellschaft ===
In 1935 two prototypes were taken into service and tested by DRG. As no major changes were necessary, serial production began shortly afterwards. From the start these powerful locomotives took over most of the express services on electrified lines. Originally intended for service on the Berlin - Munich main line, due to a different layout of the overhead lines in middle Germany (World War II prevented the planned modification). Most locomotives were used in southern Germany. Some also served in Silesia. During the development of the following Class E 19, DRG undertook several trial runs with Class E 18 in 1935 and 1936 on which a top speed of 165 km/h (103 mph) was achieved. With regards to the power, top speed and elegant design in 1937 during the Universal Exposition in Paris a Gold Medal was awarded to Class E 18.

Eight locomotives based on the E 18 series were ordered by Bundesbahn Österreich (BBÖ) in 1937 for the electrification of the Salzburg to Linz line. These were built in Austria (by Lokomotivfabrik Floridsdorf) to a modified specification. To cope with the steeper gradients in Austria's mountainous geography these units were equipped with stronger motors (developed for class E 19) and their top speed was reduced to 130 km/h (81 mph) by a different gear transmission ratio, resulting in a significantly higher tractive effort. By 1939 when the units were delivered, Austria was occupied by Germany and the locomotives were delivered to DRG as Class E 18.2 (numbers E 18 201-208). (Note: At the time DRG planned to build more than one hundred of the German version of Class E 18, and to leave room for these the different Austrian units were accordingly numbered in the 200 series.)

With 61 units so far delivered, DRG ordered an additional series of another 48 units, but these were not delivered due to the war . During the war seven units were lost to air attacks and two to accidents. The seven units deployed in Silesia were in 1945 transferred to Bavaria in order not to leave them to the advancing Red Army.

=== Deutsche Bundesbahn ===
After the war 34 units passed to the Deutsche Bundesbahn in West Germany, to which were added a further 5 locomotives purchased from East Germany in 1952 and 2 newly built Class E 18s commissioned in 1955. In 1968 Class E 18 was renumbered to DB Class 118. Even though the first production-series Class E 10 locomotives (top speed 150 km/h or 93 mph) entered service in 1956, it was not until the after the deployment of the new Class 103 TEE production-series locomotives in 1970 that Class 118 was withdrawn from main line express services. They were then used for regional services and charter trains until being retired between 1976 and 1984.

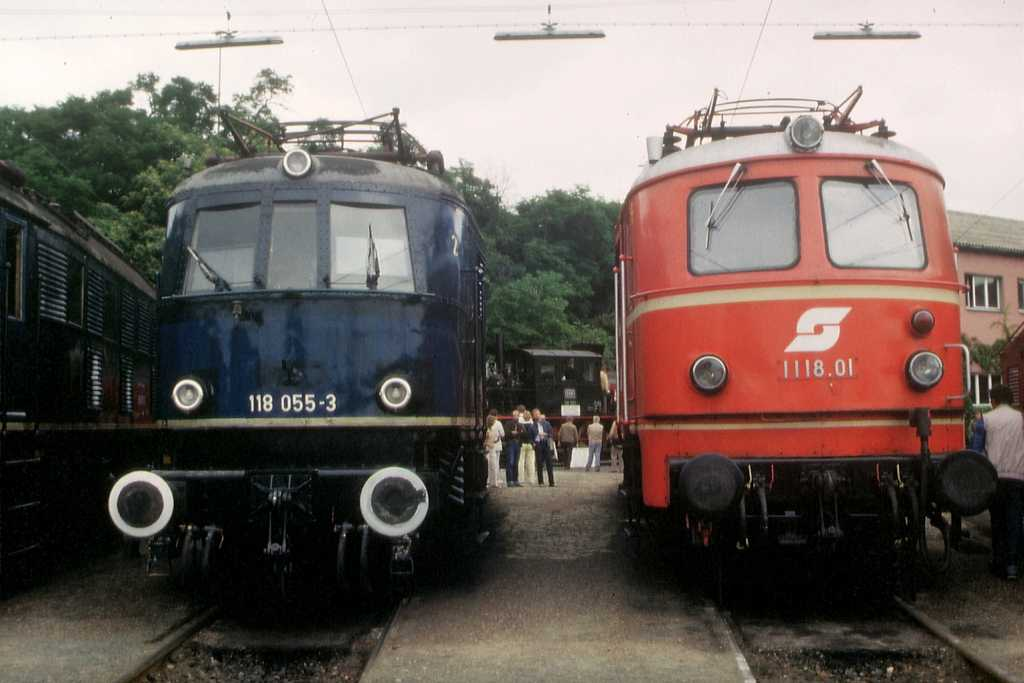
DB 118 and ÖBB 1118 in Würzburg, 1984

=== Deutsche Reichsbahn ===
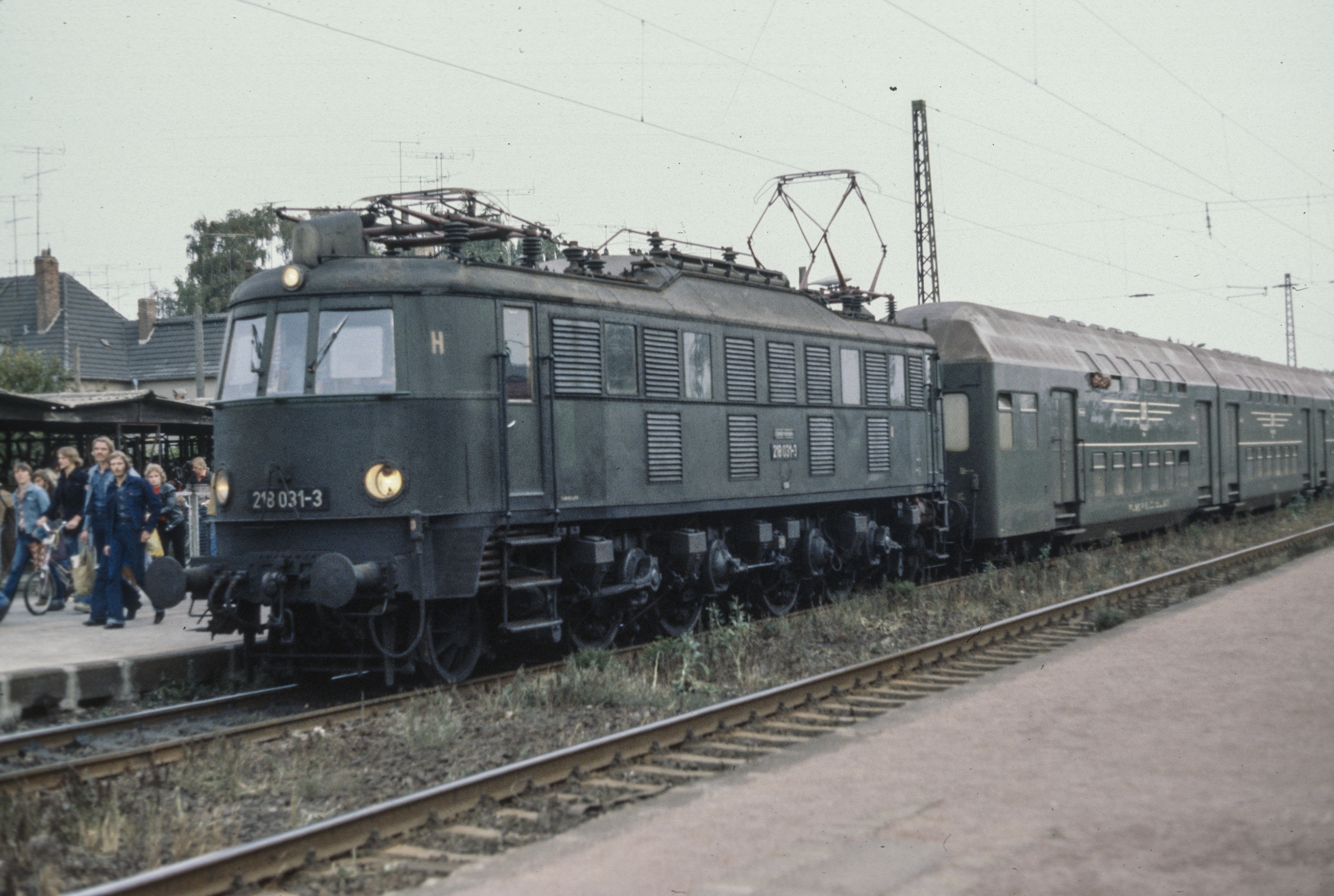
The DR Class 218 in East German service, 1979

Those Class E 18s which were left in Eastern Germany had a rather adventurous history after the war. The five units which were in usable condition were seized by the Soviet Union in 1946 as war reparations. When they were returned in 1952 (in a poor condition), Deutsche Reichsbahn (DR) sold them to West Germany's Deutsche Bundesbahn. This was partly due to the fact that much of East Germany's railway system and most of its electrification equipment had also been transferred to the Soviet Union in the early years of Soviet occupation, thus leaving little work for electric locomotives. However, during the second half of the 1950s DR began to restore electrification to its lines and therefore needed fast electric locomotives. Six damaged E 18 locomotives had been stored at the AEG factory in Hennigsdorf since the war, from which three usable units were re-assembled in 1958-60. They were converted to a top speed of 180 km/h (110 mph) in 1969. One of these locomotives was wrecked in 1969, but the other two were renumbered as DR Class 218 in 1970. The two surviving Class 218 were in service until German reunification, but were taken out of regular service shortly thereafter.

=== Österreichische Bundesbahnen ===
After the war, the newly reformed Austrian Federal Railways (now named Österreichische Bundesbahnen (ÖBB)) renumbered the seven remaining usable Class E 18.2 to ÖBB Class 1018 (1018.01-05, 07 and 08). In addition to these, one working locomotive (1018.101) was assembled from the parts of war-damaged E 18 046 and E 18 206. The ÖBB also inherited the German E 18 42, which became the solitary ÖBB Class 1118 (1118.01). These two mavericks retained German gear transmission ratios, and were ÖBB's fastest locomotives until Class 1042.5 was commissioned in the late 1960s.

The ÖBB locomotives received some modernisations (e. g. new cabfront windows, with two windows instead of the original three), and the last examples remained in service until the early 1990s.

== Preserved ==
Of the 55 Class E 18 locomotives built, six have been preserved. No. E 18 03 is in the DB Museum Koblenz. E 18 08 is owned by the Garmisch Stiftung Bahn-Sozialwerk and is stored at Augsburg Railway Park. E 18 19 is privately owned and is kept in the former Bahnbetriebswerk at Glachau. The town of Gemünden am Main is seeking to turn E 18 24 into a worthy monument with its long tradition as a railway hub, but at present it is being restored in Weimar by the TEV Thüringer Eisenbahn. E 18 31 (formerly in the DR fleet) belongs to the Dresden Transport Museum and is stored in shed P. No. E 18 47 is owned by the Nuremberg Transport Museum.

== Sources ==
- Bäzold, Dieter; Obermayer, Horst J. Eisenbahn-Journal Sonderausgabe IV/92: Die E 18 und E 19 (in German). Hermann Merker Verlag GmbH. ISBN 3-922404-38-3.
- Braun and Hofmeister (1979). E18 Portrait einer deutschen Schnellzuglok - Eisenbahnclub München e.V. (in German). München: Verlag Mayer.
- Obermayer, Horst J. (1970). Taschenbuch Deutsche Elektrolokomotiven (in German). Stuttgart: Franckh'sche Verlagshandlung. ISBN 3-440-03754-1.
- Rampp, Brian (2003). Die Baureihe E 18 - Legendäre Schnellzuglokomotiven in Deutschland und Österreich (in German). EK - Verlag Freiburg. ISBN 3-88255-218-2.
- Slezak, Josef Otto (1970). Die Lokomotiven der Republik Österreich (in German). Wien: Verlag Josef Otto Slezak. ISBN 3-85416-075-5.
