= DRG locomotive classification =

The DRG locomotive classification system was developed by the German Imperial Railway Company or Deutsche Reichsbahn-Gesellschaft (DRG), which was formed in 1924 following the merger of the German state railways (Länderbahnen) in 1920. A common classification and numbering scheme was needed in order to organise effectively the four hundred or so different steam locomotive classes taken over from the state railways, as well as new locomotives. This process lasted until 1926. Only then was the final renumbering plan fixed.

Similar systems for electric and internal combustion engined locomotives and railbuses were not developed until the 1930s, as the numbers of these types of motive power continued to rise and the previous schemes proved no longer adequate.

This classification or numbering system was repeatedly adjusted, and was continued by the Deutsche Bundesbahn until 1968 and by the Deutsche Reichsbahn in East Germany until 1970. After that the two German railway administrations introduced new computerised vehicle numbers; nevertheless the new DB classification scheme and DR classification scheme were still based on that of the DRG. In addition to the class numbers, a secondary system of German locomotive types was developed that contained the most important operating parameters of the locomotives and which was usually displayed on the cab sides.

== Steam Locomotives ==
The basic numbering system for steam locomotives comprised a class number and a serial number. The class number had two digits, the serial number had three to four digits.

New locomotives procured by the DRG were allocated their own class number. Locomotives taken over from the state railways on the foundation of the DRG were grouped into overall classes according to wheel arrangement and role, with each sub-class (Gattung, the equivalent of a former state railway 'class') being allocated its own range of serial numbers within its class.

A system of 99 class numbers (Baureihennummer, originally called Stammnummer) was established which were grouped as follows:

- 01–19: Express train locomotives
- 20–39: Passenger train locomotives
- 40–59: Goods train locomotives
- 60–79: Passenger train tank locomotives
- 80–96: Goods train tank locomotives
- 97: Rack railway locomotives
- 98: Branch line locomotives
- 99: Narrow gauge locomotives (Lokalbahnlokomotiven or Kleinbahnlokomotiven)

The lower class numbers in each of the first five groups were reserved for the new standard locomotives Einheitslokomotiven that were to be built. The higher numbers in each group were given to the state railway locomotives inherited by the DRG. Their division into state railway sub-classes was achieved by allocating sequential serial numbers, with the last two digits of the serial number being used to denote the individual vehicle and the one or two preceding digits indicating its sub-class.

Locomotives that were on the verge of retirement, were given serial numbers from 7001 onwards. Locomotive sub-classes were indicated by a superscript such as '98^{3}'. The simplified way of writing this was to write the sub-class after a decimal point so that a 'Class 98^{3}' could also be written 'Class 98.3'. The class number was independent of the type of tender attached. Tenders did not have their own numbers but displayed the number of their locomotive at the rear. The Deutsche Bundesbahn and the East German Deutsche Reichsbahn later incorporated additional classes within the classification scheme for new locomotives as well as for many of the rebuilt engines.

== Electric Locomotives ==
The renumbering of electric locomotives followed in 1926/1927 and used a similar scheme as that employed for the steam locomotives, with a main class number and a serial number. They were distinguished from steam locomotives by a preceding letter E. The engines were arranged according to top speed and the number of driven and carrying axles.

- E 00–29: over 90 km/h
  - E 00: two driving axles
  - E 01–09: three driving axles
  - E 10–29: four driving axles
    - E 10–19: two carrying axles
    - E 20–29: more than two carrying axles
- E 30–59: over 65–90 km/h
  - E 30–39: three driving axles
  - E 40–59: four driving axles
    - E 40–49: two carrying axles
    - E 50–59: more than two carrying axles
- E 60–99: under 65 km/h
  - E 60–69: three driving axles
  - E 70–89: four driving axles
    - E 70–79: two carrying axles
    - E 80–89: more than two carrying axles
  - E 90–99: six or more driving axles

If the characteristics and design were otherwise the same, locomotives with a side-rod drive were given lower class numbers than those with individually driven axles.

As a result of technological advances the system was later further expanded and adapted. This resulted in the following scheme:

- E 01–99: Alternating current (AC) locomotives (16,7 Hz)
- E 101–199: Direct current (DC) locomotives
- E 201–299: AC locomotives (50 Hz)
- E 301–399: Dual frequency AC locomotives
- E 401–499: Quadruple system locomotives
- .01–.19: Top speed over 120 km/h
- .20–.59: Top speed of 90 km/h–120 km/h
- .60–.99: Top speed under 90 km/h

== Locomotives with Internal Combustion Engines ==
Locomotives with internal combustion engines were renumbered in 1930/1931. Up to that point the DRG used a provisional system.

Like the leading E used with electric locomotives, these engines were allocated the letter V for Verbrennungslokomotive (internal combustion locomotive). This was followed by a four-digit operating number, the first two digits representing the class and the last two the serial number.

- From V01..: Express train locomotives
- From V30..: Passenger train locomotives
- From V60..: Locomotives for pusher and goods train duties

The locomotives were numbered in a direct sequence one after the other without any regard to the different types.

From 1931 a considerably better system was introduced. This distinguished between larger locomotives of more than 150 PS and the so-called 'small locomotives, of which the Köf I, II and III are probably the best-known examples.

The letter V was retained and was followed by two- or three-digit class numbers and three-digit serial numbers.

The class number was derived from the locomotive power. The number represented one-tenth of its power in PS.

Serial numbers 001–899 were intended for standard gauge locomotives and 901–999 for narrow gauge locomotives.

=== Small Locomotives ===
The term 'small locomotive' was introduced by the Deutsche Reichsbahn in 1931 for engines that were employed in shunting duties, by stations and industrial installations. However they required clearance for working on the open line in order, for example, to be able to deliver goods wagons to junctions outside of station yards. Within this 'job description' there were vehicles called Rangierschlepper that worked exclusively within station yards and industrial sidings. The limit was an engine power of less than 150 PS and a top speed of no more than 30 km/h.

Small locomotives were designated with the letter K for Kleinlokomotiven.

The main letter was supplemented by two further letters describing its technical features:

- b = petrol-driven (Benzin i.e. petrol)
- d = steam-driven (Dampfmaschine i.e. steam engine)
- ö = diesel-driven (Öl i.e. 'oil')
- s = accumulator car (Speicher i.e. storage battery); this letter was changed by the DB in 1960 to a
- e = electrical power transmission (by generator)
- f = hydraulic transmission (Flüssigkeitsgetriebe i.e. hydraulic drive)

In addition the operating numbers were divided into power groups:

- Power group I (Leistungsgruppe I) = motor power less than 40 PS (operating numbers 0001–3999)
- Power group II (Leistungsgruppe II) = motor power more than 40 PS (operating numbers 4000–9999)

== Railbuses ==
Railbuses were arranged by the DRG within the spare number ranges for passenger coaches. No special letter was allocated to these vehicles. The numbers available were: 1–10 199 and from 133 000.

=== Steam Railbuses ===
Numbers 1-200 were reserved for steam railbuses. Operating numbers were supplemented by the name of the Reichsbahn railway division in which they were stationed. Two-axled railbuses were given numbers starting at 1, four-axled ones numbers starting at 51. The letters DT were never officially used.

=== Electric Railbuses ===
In 1924 the electric railbuses in the railway divisions of Altona, Breslau and Munich were initially given the numbers starting at 501 for driving coaches and 5001 for trailer coaches. In addition they were given the name of their home division. Because every Reichsbahn division therefore had numbers beginning with 501, there were many cases of several vehicles with the same number which could only be distinguished by their divisional name. Subsequently, new procurements for other divisions were also incorporated into this system.

S-Bahn vehicles in Berlin were allocated numbers from 2051 for driving coaches and 5051 for trailer coaches.

In 1930, the DRG renumbered these vehicles, resulting in every four-digit operating number only being available once. Catenary railbuses were allocated the range of numbers from 1000 to 1999 and their associated trailer cars were given numbers from 2001. Power coaches on the Berlin S-Bahn were numbered from 3001 onwards; their driving coaches were given numbers starting at 5001 and the trailer coaches at 6001.

In 1940 new designations were decreed by the RZA München. The classification system comprised a leading pair of letters plus a two- or three-digit class number and a two-digit serial number.

Group letters:

- ET: Electric power coach (Triebwagen)
- ES: Driving coach (Steuerwagen)
- EB: Trailer coach (Beiwagen)
- EM: Centre coach (Mittelwagen) in multiple trains

Class numbers:

- ET 01–99: Vehicles for single-phase AC with 16,7 Hz or 25 Hz
- ET 101–199: Vehicles for DC
- ET 201–299: Vehicles for other electrical systems

Number ranges for railbuses were further divided based on their role:

- 01–09: Long-distance express railbuses
- 10–39: Fast railbuses
- 40–59: Fast-stopping railbuses
- 60–79: Commuter railbuses
- 80–89: Branch line railbuses
- 90–99: Special railbuses

=== Accumulator Cars ===
The DRG organised accumulator cars from 1924 into the number range 201–700. Like the electric railbuses, each division began to number its vehicles from 201 onwards. As a result of the obvious disadvantage of this system (several vehicles could have the same number and were only distinguishable by the name of their division), the DRG re-introduced the system that had been used by the Prussian state railways since 1910.

All vehicles were numbered in sequenced starting with 201. Centre coaches were given a leading '0'. The designation AT was only used unofficially.

In 1940 new rules were issued by the RZA München for the designation of accumulator cars, however they were not renumbered until 1948 and then by the Deutsche Bundesbahn. The system envisaged the introduction of a system similar to that of the electric railbuses, with a leading letter group, a class number and a serial number.

Letter groups:

- ETA: Power coach (Triebwagen)
- EBA: Trailer coach (Beiwagen)
- ESA: Driving coach (Steuerwagen)

Because all railbuses were regarded as DC vehicles, they were given a class number range of 100–199 and were organised as follows:

- 140–159: Fast-stopping railbuses
- 160–179: Commuter railbuses
- 180–189: Branch line railbuses

=== Internal Combustion Engined Railbuses ===
From 1924, railbuses with internal combustion engines were allocated the number range 701–899. Again the operating number was supplemented by the name of the division to which the vehicle belonged.

To distinguish between the various types, the following system was adopted:

- 701–750: twin-axled railbuses with petrol motors
- 751–799: four-axled railbuses with petrol motors
- 801–850: twin-axled railbuses with diesel motors
- 851–899: four- and more-axled railbuses with diesel motors

When the railbuses were taken over by the Federal Railways of Austria (BBÖ), numbers after 900 had to be reserved. For goods railbuses, numbers from 10 001 were used.

As a result of the rising procurement of new railbuses these numbers were no longer sufficient. So, from 1932, numbers from 133 000 were used for the new vehicles of 'light construction' or 'light railbuses'. The organisation of these vehicles was as follows:

- 133 000–133 999: twin-axled railbuses with petrol motors
- 134 000–134 999: four-axled railbuses with petrol motors
- 135 000–136 999: twin-axled railbuses with diesel motors
- 137 000–138 999: four- and more-axled railbuses with diesel motors
- 140 000–143 999: twin-axled trailer coaches
- 144 000–144 999: four-axled trailer coaches
- 145 000–146 999: twin-axled driving coaches
- 147 000–149 999: four-axled driving coaches

The numbering of vehicles followed the order in which they were delivered, which meant that vehicles of the same class were not numbered sequentially. The letters VT and SVT were never officially used.

A classification system comparable to that of the electric railbuses was introduced by the Deutsche Bundesbahn in 1948.

== See also ==
- History of rail transport in Germany
- Deutsche Reichsbahn
- Deutsche Reichsbahn-Gesellschaft
- UIC classification

== Literature ==
- Wolfgang Valtin: Verzeichnis aller Lokomotiven und Triebwagen. Bd 1. transpress, Berlin 1992. ISBN 3-344-70739-6
