= DB locomotive classification =

Originally, both Deutsche Bundesbahn and Deutsche Reichsbahn continued the classification system of the Deutsche Reichsbahn (DRG) – see also a short overview of the numbering system of the German railways. When UIC introduced a new classification system that could be processed by the computers of the late 1960s, DB did a major modification of their system, effective 1 January 1968. This system is still in use and now includes the engines of the former GDR railways as well. (See List of Deutsche Bahn AG locomotives and railbuses for a current list.)

== Basics ==
Since January 1, 1968, all vehicles are identified by a seven-digit vehicle number that consists of a three-digit class number, a three-digit serial number, and a check digit, the latter separated by a dash. Series with more than 1,000 vehicles are assigned ascending class numbers.

The first digit of the class number denotes the vehicle type using a scheme that is summarized in the following table, along with the corresponding letters from the DRG vehicle type scheme. While the DRG scheme was officially superseded by the current scheme, it can still be found in informal writing and conversation: for example, "E110" is equivalent to "E10" and "110", and "V216" is equivalent to "V160" and "216".

Vehicle Type Scheme
Number	Letters	Vehicle type
0		Steam locomotives
1	E	Electric locomotives
2	V	Diesel locomotives
3	K	Small shunting locomotives
4	ET	Electric multiple units, not including battery-powered
5	ETA	Battery-powered railcars
6	VT	Diesel multiple units
7		Railbuses and work vehicles
8	ES, EB	Cab cars and accompanying cars to electric railcars
9	VS, VB	Cab cars and accompanying cars to diesel railcars and railbuses

The check digit is used to verify the accuracy of the first six digits and is calculated as follows:

- Sum the first, third, and fifth digits
- Multiply each of the second, fourth, and sixth digits by two
  - If any result is greater than 10, treat it as two separate digits: for example, if the second digit was 8, the results are 1 and 6, not 16, and if the fourth digit was 5, the results are 1 and 0, not 10
- Add the results from the previous step to the result from the first step
  - If the result is an even multiple of 10, the check digit is 0
  - Otherwise, the check digit is the result subtracted from the next higher value of 10

Tenders are not assigned a number because they are regarded a part of the vehicle to which they are coupled.

Cab cars and intermediate cars of multiple units receive the numbers 8 if they belong to an EMU, 9 if they belong to a DMU. If another powered car or engine is present in the multiple unit, its serial number usually is offset by 500, but it is still assigned into the original class.

=== Examples ===
A two-car Class 628 DMU:

- 628 210-7 (powered cab car)
- 928 210-4 (non-powered cab, hence 9 instead of 6)

A class 420 commuter EMU:

- 420 210-1 (powered cab car)
- 421 210-2 (powered intermediate car)
- 420 710-7 (powered cab car, +500)

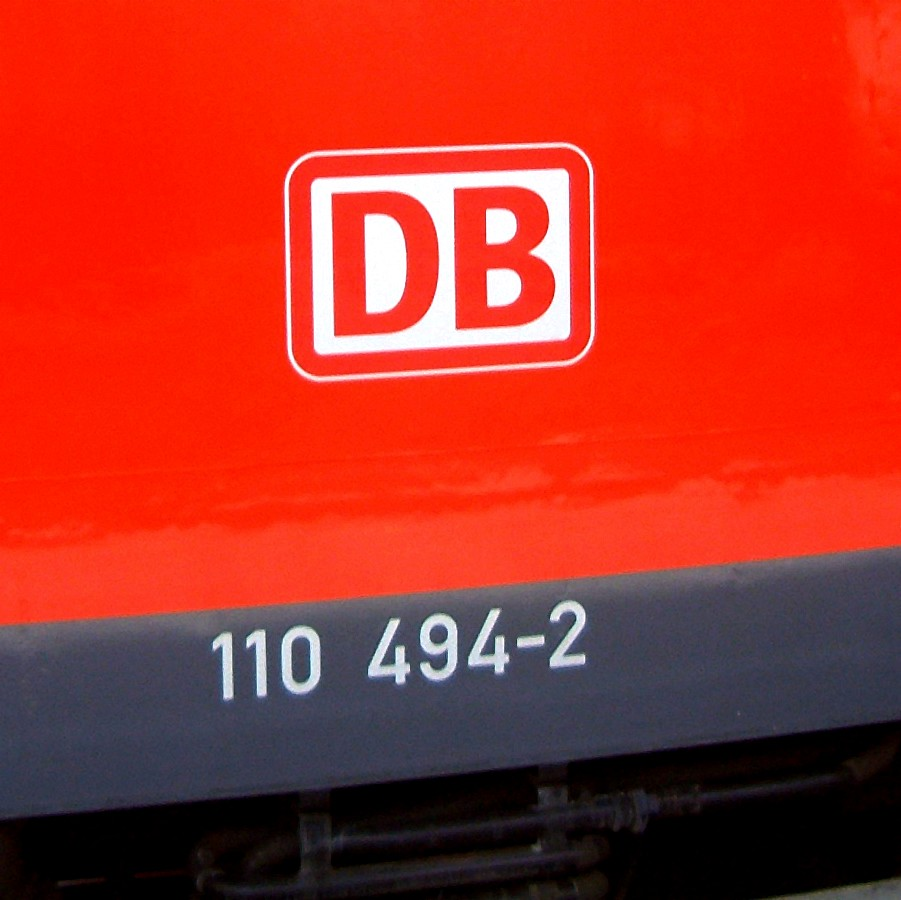
Electric class 110 locomotive - 110 494-2

Detailed example: 110 494-2
Components
110	Class number: first digit (1) denotes electric locomotive
494	Serial number
2	Check digit
Derivation of check digit
10	Sum of first (1), third (0), and fifth (9) digits
18	The second (1), fourth (4), and sixth (4) digits each multiplied by two and summed (2 + 8 + 8)
28	Sum of the previous two values (10 + 18)
30	Next higher multiple of ten from the previous value
2	Difference between the previous two values

Detailed example: 044 557-7
Components
044	Class number: first digit (0) denotes steam locomotive
557	Serial number
7	Check digit
Derivation of check digit
9	Sum of first (0), third (4), and fifth (5) digits
14	The second (4), fourth (5), and sixth (7) digits each multiplied by two, broken down into their component digits if 10 or greater, and summed (8 + 1 + 0 + 1 + 4)
23	Sum of the previous two values (9 + 14)
30	Next higher multiple of ten from the previous value
7	Difference between the previous two values

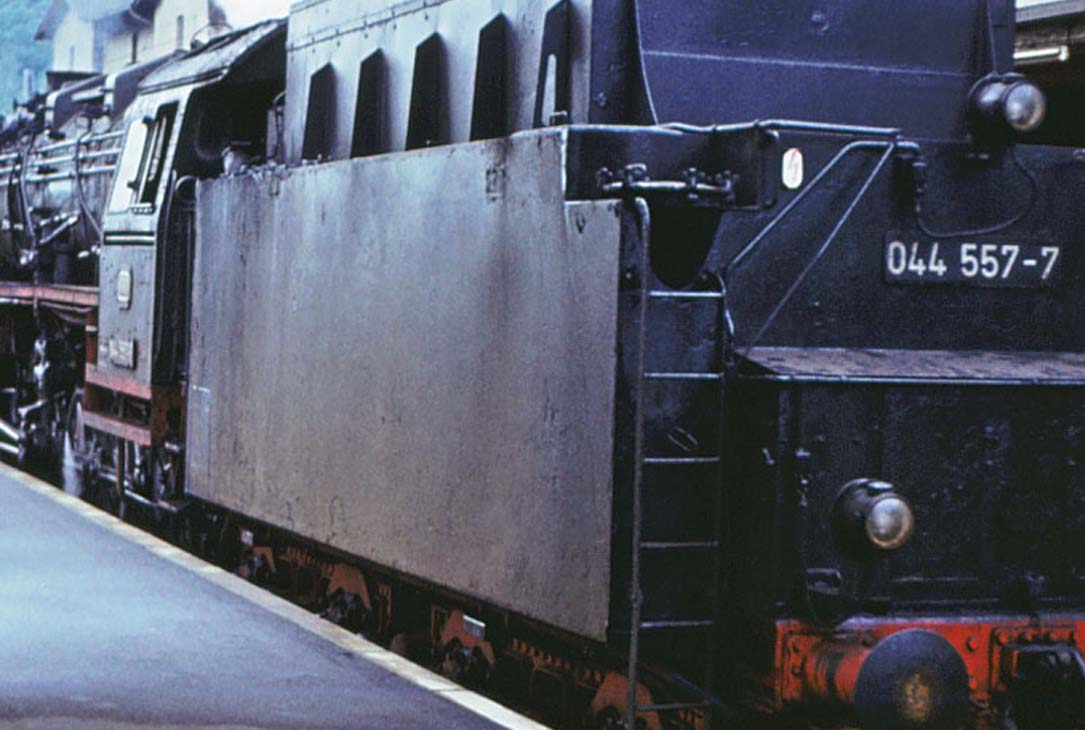
Steam locomotive 044 557-7

== Steam locomotives ==
See also: DRG locomotive classification for the origins of the system.

The number 0 was assigned to steam locomotives, as their end of duty was already foreseeable. The schematics are largely derivative of the DRG system of classification, therefore like in the older system the class numbers were grouped by locomotive types:

Number	Vehicle types
001–019	Express train tender locomotives
020–039	Other Passenger train tender locomotives
040–059	Freight train tender locomotives
060–079	Passenger train tank locomotives
080–096	Freight train tank locomotives
097	Rack locomotives (in theory only - none were left by 1968)
098	Lokalbahn (branch line) engines
099	narrow gauge locomotives

Steam locomotives that had been converted to oil fuelling received separate class numbers from their coal-fuelled counterparts, e. g. oil-fuelled units from the old class 44 were assigned to class 043 while coal-fuelled ones were assigned to class 044 under the new numbering plan. The DRB Class 50 (with originally more than 3,000 units, of which DB still had more than 1,000 by the end of 1967) gave rise to BR 050, 051, 052 and 053.

A noteworthy change from the old system was that four-digit engine numbers were no longer possible. Locomotives with such a number would either be put into an overflow class (e. g. 50 3097 became 053 097-2) or have their number abbreviated to three digits. The latter solution could lead to number conflicts in cases where the original (sub)class had comprised more than 1,000 units. These were dealt with by adjusting one of the numbers involved, e. g., 38 3711 became 038 711-8 while 38 1711 became 038 710-0. This also means that for some classes it is not possible to reconstruct the old number from the new one in a purely systematic way.

The last steam locomotives in the Deutsche Bundesbahn were decommissioned on 26 October 1977 at Rheine und Emden locomotive depot (Bahnbetriebswerk or Bw). These were the 043 903, 043 315 and 043 196 .

== Electric engines ==
Electric engines were considered the most important method of traction, and hence were assigned the number 1. They usually were relabelled by replacing the letter "E" with the number "1". For example, the Einheits-Elektrolokomotiven were relabelled from E 40 into 140, E 10 into 110 and E 10.12 into 112.

== Diesel engines ==
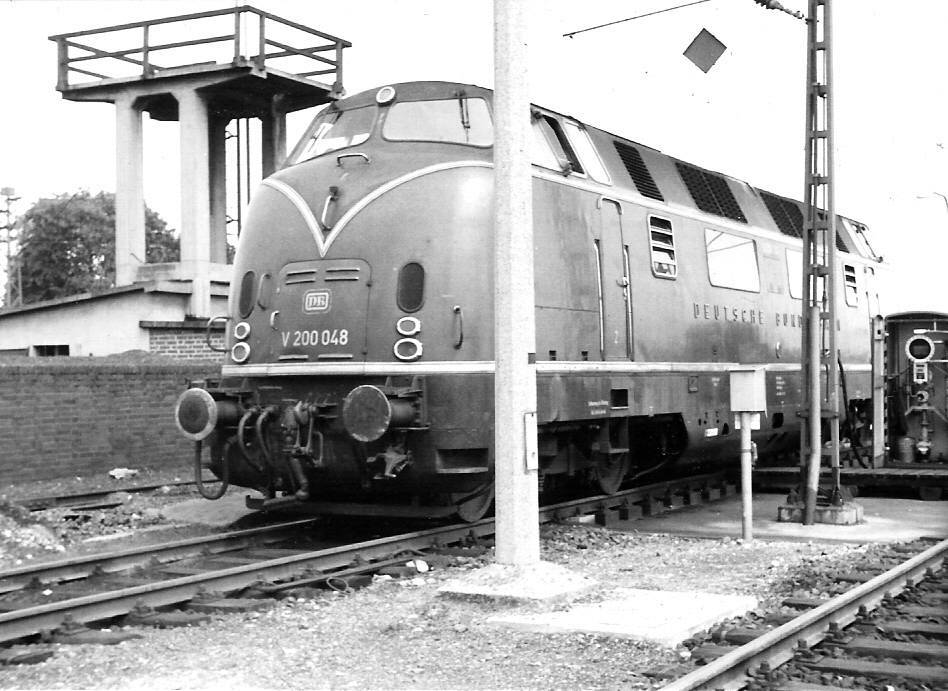
V200 No. 048 in West Germany, circa 1961.

In the pre-1968 scheme, diesel engines were assigned the letter "V" (as in the German term Verbrennungsmotor for combustion engine). The old numbers were directly proportional with the engine power, so that two- and three-digit codes existed. Two-digit codes were transposed one by one (Examples: Class V60 became Class 260, Class V80 became Class 280). Three digit codes generally lost their last digit (V 160 became DB Class 216). Variants of the previously same class were also assigned individual subclasses, the V 160 family, consisting of V 160, V 160 long (V 160.3, V 168), V 162, V 164 and V 169 were assigned the numbers 210, 215, 216, 217, 218 and 219, for example.)

== Small locomotives ==
Small shunting locomotives were assigned the number "3". The second number indicates the engine power (according to 1955 standards). The third number differentiates between brakes and transmission (chain drive or Cardan shafts). Small locomotives of the former Ka series were given the new class numbers 381 (pre-war models) and 382 (new models). The existing narrow gauge locomotives of the Wangerooge Island Railway became Class 329. In 1987 the DB Class 260/261 were also assigned to the small locomotives and labelled as Class 360/361.

== See also ==
- History of rail transport in Germany
- Deutsche Bundesbahn
- UIC classification
