= Mainline steam trains in Great Britain =

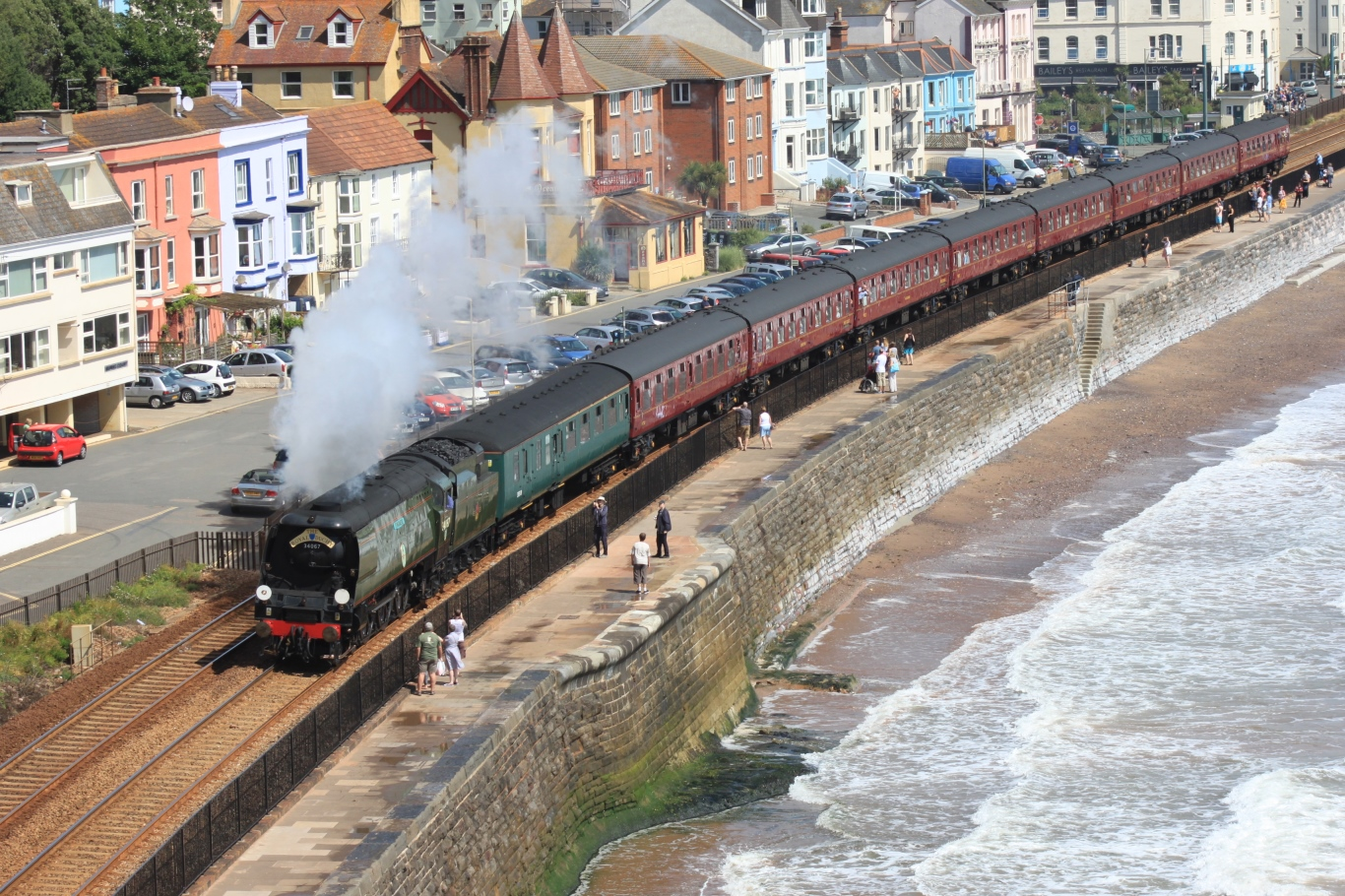
The Royal Duchy train, hauled by Tangmere, along the Dawlish sea wall in 2015

Although steam locomotives were withdrawn from normal railway service in Great Britain in 1968, due to sustained public interest including a locomotive preservation movement, steam hauled passenger trains can still be seen on the mainline railway (i.e. Network Rail owned tracks as opposed to heritage railways) in the present day.

== History ==
Following the focus of BR on diesel trains in the 1960s, the last steam-hauled service trains on the standard gauge mainline of the British Railways network ran in August 1968, the last train itself being the Fifteen Guinea Special on 11 August, although narrow gauge trains were still run until 1987 on the Vale of Rheidol Railway. The day after the final service, BR then imposed a complete ban on mainline steam services, with one exception, Flying Scotsman, due to Alan Pegler having secured a clause in the purchase contract when it was purchased from BR in 1963. After this time, the only place to see steam trains was on privately owned heritage railways and industries.

The ban was lifted in 1971, paving the way for the earliest post-ban heritage services. A train hauled by King George V was the first to run after the ban, and it paved the way for BR to authorise more and more routes for steam operation (based on them having the necessary infrastructure and timetabling capacity); in response to growing public demand for such services, the Steam Locomotive Operators' Association was formed in 1975 to bring together and assist operators wishing to run on the main line, negotiating a programme of tours with BR.

== Operation ==
In the post-privatisation era, the typical manner in which mainline steam trains are operated is for a promoter or customer to contract a charter train operating company (TOC) to run it on their behalf. The TOCs are the legal entities which are licensed to operate trains; they are responsible for providing the three-man professional train crew consisting of the engine driver, fireman and traction inspector, and negotiating access to the network from Network Rail. Locomotives and coaching stock will ordinarily be hired by the TOC on an as needed basis (known as spot-hire), although some stock is owned by the TOCs directly. As of 2013, only two charter TOCs were licensed for steam operation – DB Schenker and West Coast Railways. Of the 410,000 miles of charter train operation in 2012/13, 103,000 of this was steam hauled.

Due to their unique aspects, the safe operation of steam locomotives on the mainline is governed by its own Railway Group Standard, Steam Locomotive Operation, in addition to all other applicable standards. Depending on wheel diameter, locomotives on the mainline are permitted to operate up to maximum speeds ranging from 35 to 75 mph - the maximum permitted on minor and heritage lines normally being 25 mph.

With water troughs having been removed after the withdrawal of mainline steam, trains must now stop for water, being refilled via hoses from road going tankers (preferred over static hydrants due to pressure inconsistencies and the possibility of contamination), although mainline water cranes do still exist in some places. Additionally, water scoops in the tender are also required to be removed as well.

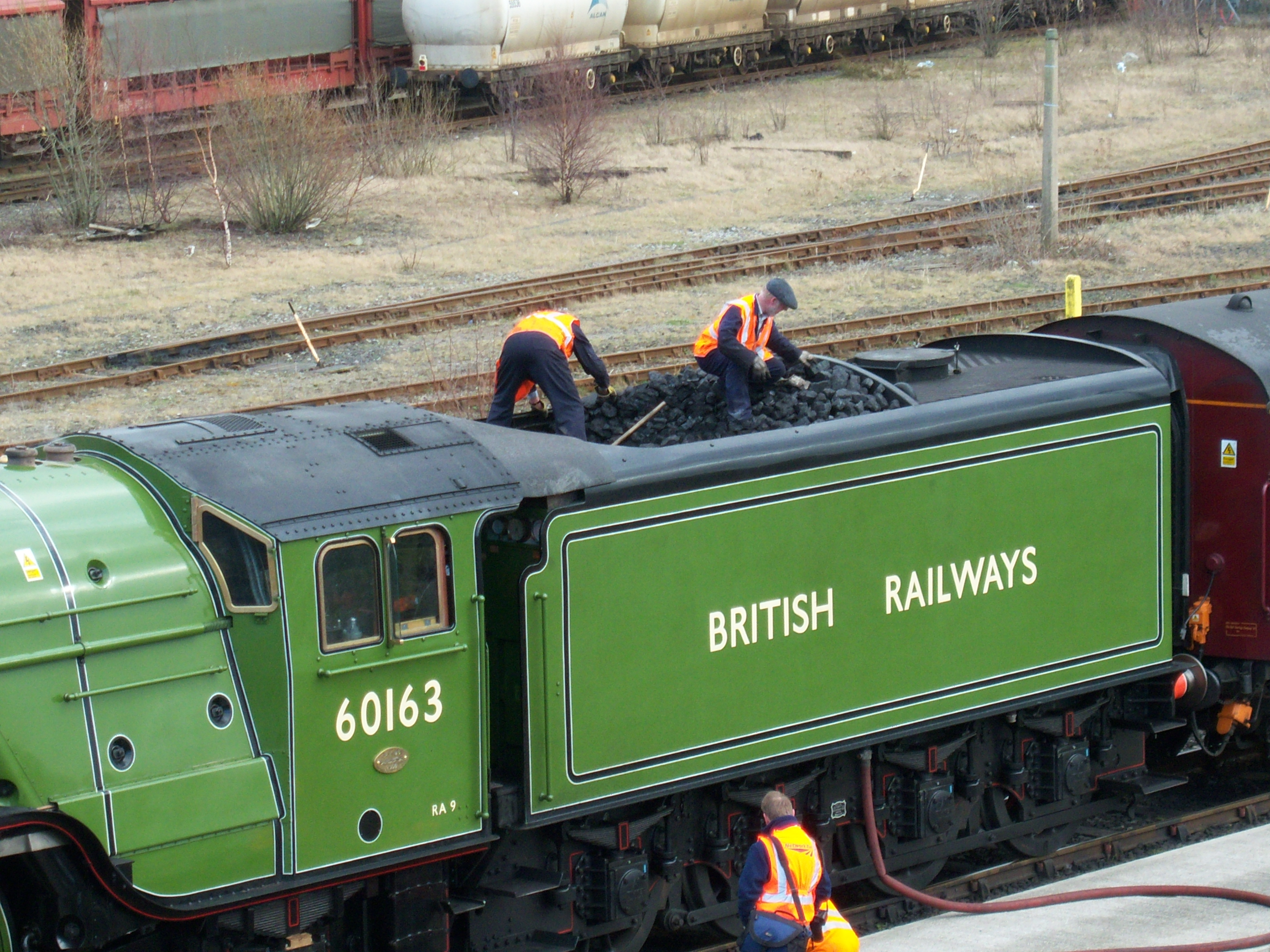
The support crew of Tornado adjust the coal distribution while the tender is refilled with water by hose

With the locomotives often away from their home base, or even any kind of operating base, support crews numbering around half a dozen people usually travel with the train, their role being to prepare the locomotive, tend to it on water stops and repair any fixable issues arising, and clear the ashpan as part of a disposal routine at the end of the day. As a result, as well as the passenger coaches, mainline steam trains will also feature a support coach, normally a passenger brake van of the British Railways Mark 1 or Mark 2 era, specially fitted out to provide seating/sleeping, catering and workshop facilities for the support crew, plus space to carry spares and equipment (i.e. hoses), including that required for the modern equipment needed on a mainline equipped train. While on the move, one support crew member rides on the footplate, to act as the locomotive owner's representative and assist the train crew – who have general knowledge of steam locomotives and the UK mainline – by offering specialist knowledge of the idiosyncrasies of the specific locomotive, and reacting to matters arising. On the move, the remaining crew in the support coach will also record the locomotive's performance while operating, including punctuality and fuel efficiency.

== Locomotives ==
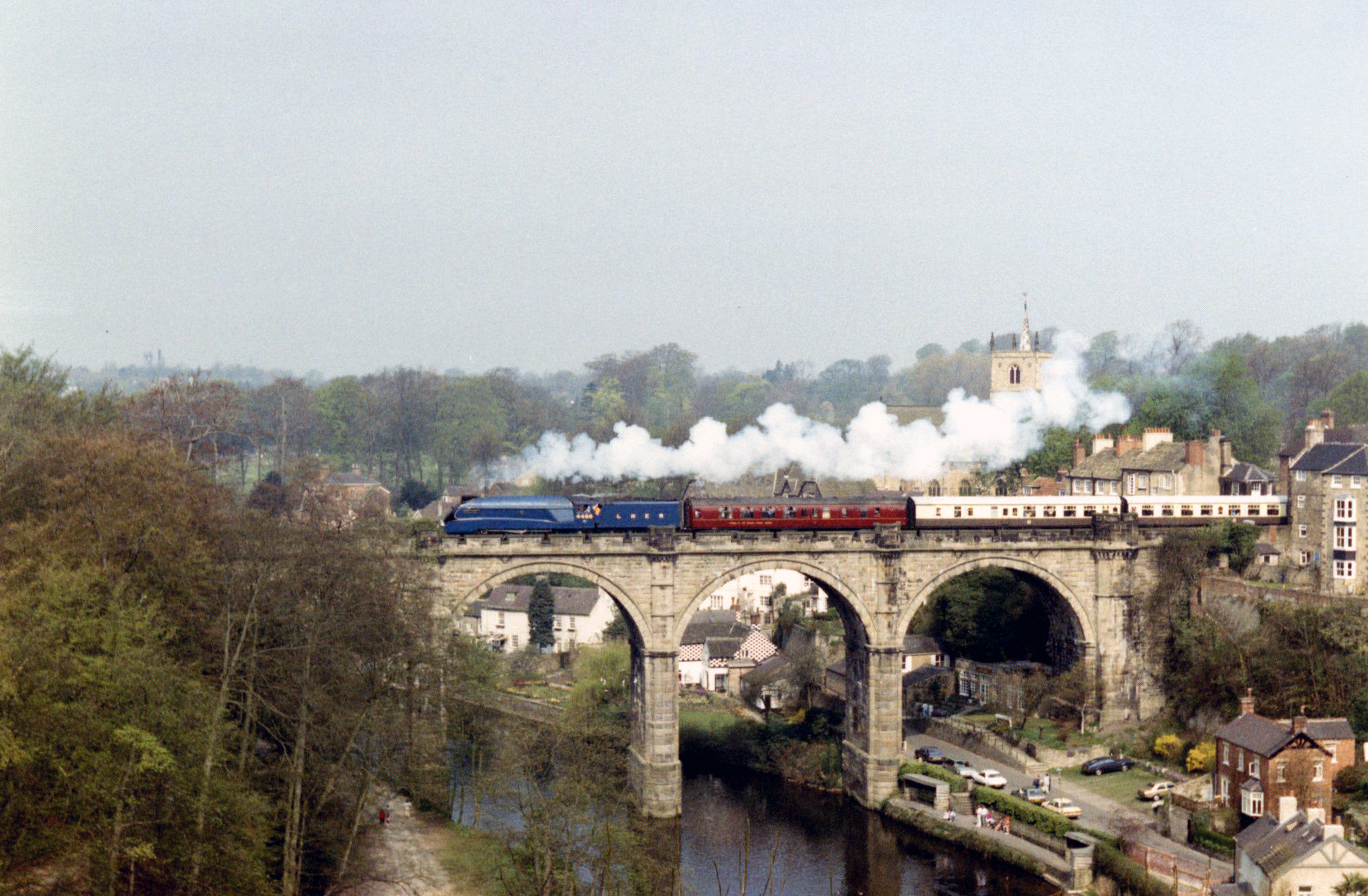
Mallard on Knaresborough viaduct in 1987

Most locomotives used are examples built during the steam era and later preserved, being suitably modified to run on the modern mainline. In 2009 the locomotive Tornado hauled its maiden mainline train, being the first brand new steam locomotive to be built in Britain for use on the main line since Evening Star, completed in 1960.

The most famous steam locomotive operating on the British main line is the 1923 built Flying Scotsman. After being taken into public ownership in 2004, following a decade long refit it returned to mainline service in 2016. The fastest steam locomotive ever built, the 1938 built Mallard, was also certified for main line operation briefly in the 1980s.

== Services ==
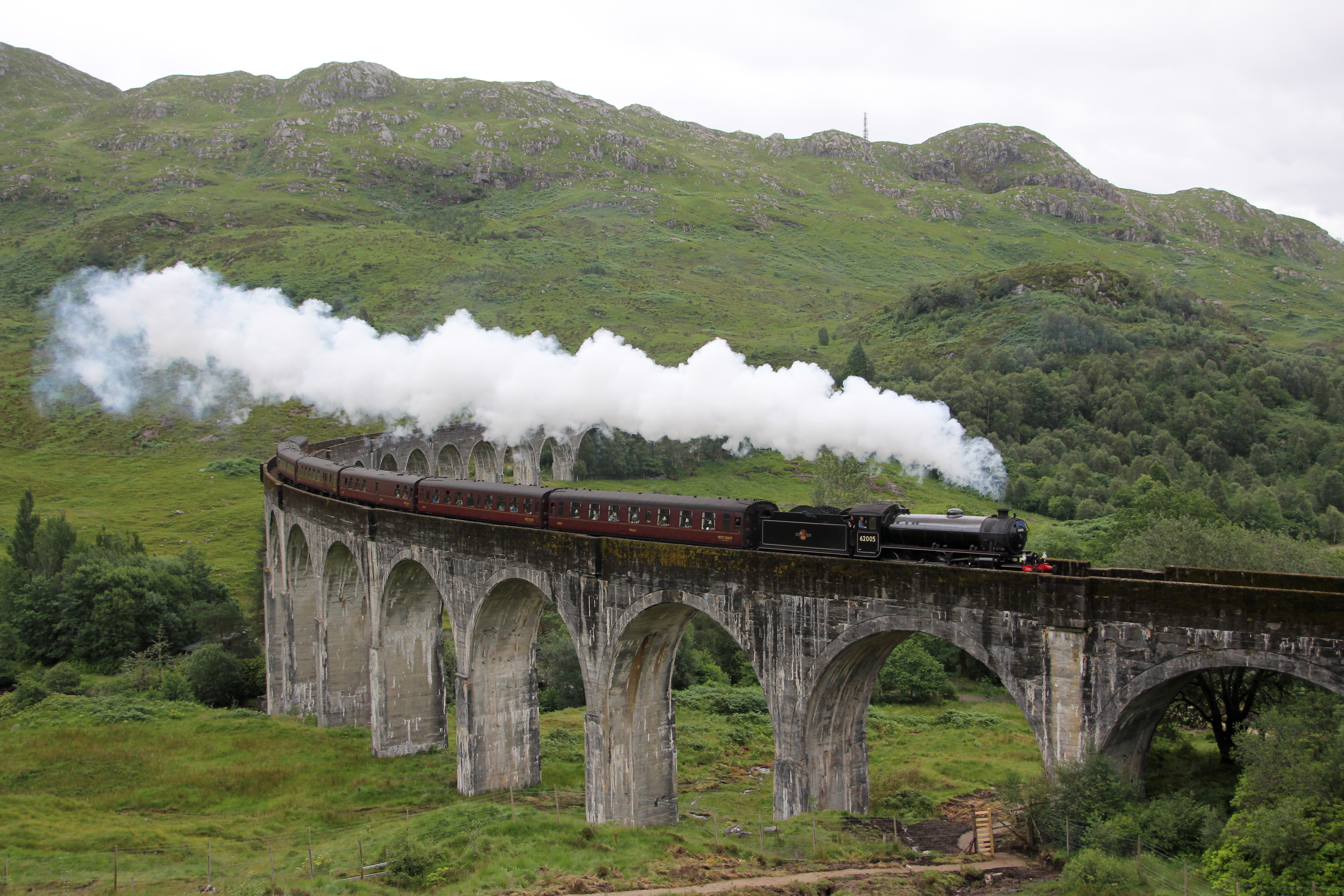
The Jacobite, hauled by Lord of the Isles, crossing the Glenfinnan Viaduct

Most steam-hauled mainline services are operated as public charters - i.e. trains organised by a tour operator and available to passengers on a pre-booked basis only. Certain services however are run as scheduled services. In some cases, trains are operated as private charters. A small number of journeys by the British Royal Train have been hauled by steam traction.

Many of the services have names which echo the historic named passenger trains of the United Kingdom, and will often feature an appropriate headboard. The Jacobite is summer season daily service along the West Highland Line in Scotland, voted the most scenic in the world in 2009. The Torbay Express is a regular summer season weekend service in the South West. The Scarborough Spa Express is another regular summer season service, which was originally run in the BR era of the 1980s, before being revived again in the 2000s by various private operators. Selected services run by the luxury train operator Belmond (formerly Orient-Express) are steam hauled - the UK leg of the Venice-Simplon Orient Express, plus the British Pullman and Northern Belle.

In 2007, the North Yorkshire Moors Railway, a heritage railway, gained permission from Network Rail to extend some of its steam services along a 6-mile stretch of the Esk Valley Line, from Grosmont (the NYMR northern terminus) to Whitby. This marked the first time that a volunteer-run heritage railway had been allowed to operate services on NR track.

In an effort to boost tourism in the summer of 2015, the Abellio ScotRail railway franchise began offering steam specials on scenic routes, although the company was criticised for having not promoted the services enough, leading to an initial shortfall in demand, which Abellio attributed to a late change of operator. The franchise also provided 3 days a week steam specials on the newly opened Borders Railway between Edinburgh and Tweedbank. Network Rail suffered heavy criticism after an error led to it proposing to cancel trips hauled by Flying Scotsman on these services with just two days notice, only to reverse their decision a day later. Hailed as a success, the Borders Railway trips returned for the 2016 season.

On three consecutive days in February 2017, Northern Rail replaced two return journeys between Appleby and Skipton, normally operated by a diesel multiple-unit, with steam-hauled services worked by No. 60163 Tornado. Unlike the services described above, regular National Rail tickets were valid for travel on these trains, thus making them the first regular scheduled steam-hauled passenger trains since the end of BR steam.

== Issues ==
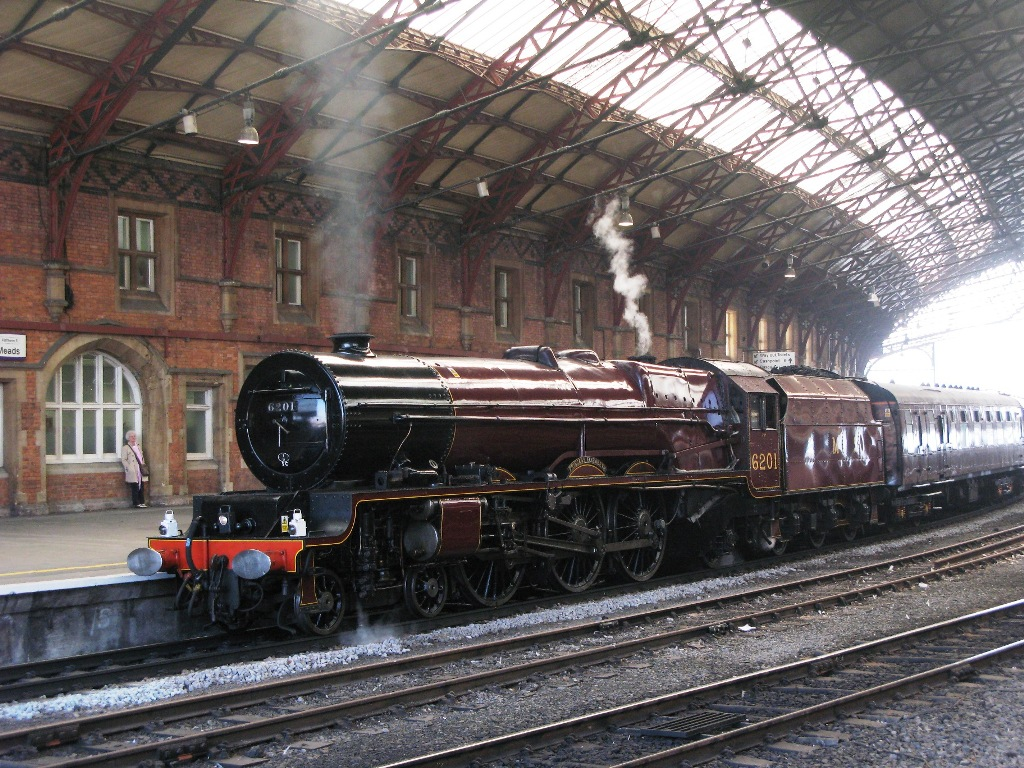
Princess Elizabeth at Bristol Temple Meads during a railtour

Network Rail identify the greatest operational risk of steam locomotives on the modernised network as lineside fires, caused by embers from the fire box, since they can cause both damage to equipment and delays to services. According to Network Rail, the risk to the modern railway is higher than in the days of normal steam operation, as lineside vegetation is thicker and greener due to not being regularly burned back by lineside fires. In 2008 a locomotive was banned from the main line after causing a severe damage to a Cumbrian Coast Line wooden viaduct, although this was presumed to be due to a fault with the engine. Network Rail has issued bans on steam services running on certain parts of its network in response to lineside fires; in 2011 banning weekday services on the East Coast Main Line, and in 2014 banning all services on the LNE & East Midlands Route, although critics have described them as disproportionate and made various arguments as to how they are unjustified. In a pre-emptive measure during a heatwave in August 2013, steam services across much of the network were banned (unless hauled by a diesel over a banned section). Network Rail also pre-emptively bans steam operation in any area affected by industrial action by a Fire Brigade.

The operational risks of steam locomotives on the network were highlighted to the wider public in 2015 following the Wootton Bassett SPAD incident, when a steam charter train passed a signal at danger (SPAD) near Wootton Bassett Junction. Although no collision resulted, it led to the major steam train charter operator, West Coast Railways, having their network access license suspended, and then revoked in February 2015 after further issues came to light. This resulted in serious disruption of main line steam services due to their being the largest operator in the British steam hauled market by a wide margin. Their prohibition was finally lifted in March 2016. In June 2016 the driver was given a suspended four-month prison sentence after pleading guilty to breaches of Health and Safety law, while WCRC were fined £260,000 after also admitting to two breaches.

Due to the popularity of steam trains with the public, trespassing on the railway is seen as a major issue by Network Rail and the British Transport Police. The debut of Flying Scotsman resulted in Network Rail having to pay £60,000 in compensation (to train operators) after 59 services were affected by a combined total of more than 8 hours of service delays. As a preventive measure, timings of its subsequent trips were deliberately not released to the public, and reminders have been issued that trespass on the railway is a criminal offence and that offenders risk a criminal record and fines of up to £1,000. The final last resort would be banning Flying Scotsman from the mainline if excessive trespassing and disobeying railway safety was repeated.

== Economic impact ==
Mainline steam operation is estimated to contribute at least £30 million annually to the economy.

== See also ==
- List of British heritage and private railways
