= DR locomotive classification =

Emblem of the Deutsche Reichsbahn in East Germany

The DR locomotive classification scheme in East Germany in the initial post-war period used the DRG system, consisting of a class number (Baureihennummer) followed by a serial number (Ordnungsnummer). With the introduction of computerised (EDP) numbers in 1970 as part of the UIC framework, the system was fundamentally changed for the first time.

In the allocation of operating numbers up to 1970 the Deutsche Bundesbahn and the Deutsche Reichsbahn in East Germany took care, for the most part, to ensure that they did not overlap with one another.

== To 1970 ==
=== Steam locomotives ===
On 1 January 1950 almost all the public railways that did not belong to the Reichsbahn were nationalised. In order integrate the many, different locomotives into the existing numbering system, it was essential to adopt the renumbering plan of 12 December 1949 that built on the previous system.

The locomotives were grouped together into classes of the same or similar design. Locomotives were given the range of numbers from 5000 to 7000. However, the numbering was not consecutive, but was based on two technical aspects.

The first two figures gave the axle load in Mp. However, in order to ensure numbers fell within the allocated range, the number 50 had to be added. So, for example, locomotives with an axle load of 10 Mp were given the serial number 60.

The last two figures were based on whether the locomotive used saturated or superheated steam. Saturated steam locomotives were given the numbers 01 to 75 and superheated locomotives the numbers 76 to 99.

For narrow gauge locomotives with the class number 99 a similar scheme was chosen. Here, however, there were additional rules which were supposed to be followed when allocating the operating numbers (Betriebsnummer). Due to their complexity, these rules were not always adhered to. The first digit gave the rail gauge: 3 = 600 mm, 4 = 750 mm, 5 and 6 = 1,000 mm. The next digit indicated the axle load, with a '0' being used for 10 Mp and a '1' for 11 Mp. The last two digits indicated whether the engine was a tank locomotive (01 to 50) or a tender locomotive (from 51). The last steam locomotives in the Deutsche Reichsbahn were decommissioned in the 1980s.

=== Internal Combustion engined locomotives ===
The DRG locomotive classification scheme continued to be used.

=== Electric Locomotives ===
The DRG locomotive classification scheme continued to be used.

=== Railcars ===
As part of the nationalisation of private railways on 1 January 1950, railcars also had to be integrated into the numbering scheme. The spare numbers from 500 were used for this purpose. The railcars were, however, given different class numbers (Stammnummern) from those in the DRG's system. Class 133 was allocated to light, rail-omnibus-like, two-axled vehicles without standard drawbars or buffers. All other twin-axled railcars were given the class number 135. Petrol-driven vehicles were given serial numbers 501 to 503, diesel-motored ones numbers 509 to 550 and diesel-electric vehicles the numbers 551 to 553.

All four-, five- and six-axled railcars were organised into Class 137. Those with diesel-mechanical drives were given serial numbers 511 to 532, diesel-electrics were number from 551 to 566 and diesel-hydraulic vehicles were given numbers from 571 onwards.

The electric railcars that were taken over were designated as Class ET 188 and the steam railcars acquired from the Oderbruchbahn were grouped into Class DT 151.

Modified railcars used their previous DRG wagon numbers, but these were prefixed by the DR with the letters VT.

For new vehicles another scheme was used. In 1954 a new system was introduced for the fast Ganz (DR Class VT 12.14) railcars imported from Hungary. After the class letters 'VT' the next two digits indicated the top speed divided by 10. The average axle load followed, separated by a full stop. After a second full stop, were the two digits of the vehicle's serial number.

Yet another system was used from 1956. With this one the first group of numbers gave the motor power divided by 100, the second group the top speed/10 and the third group the 2- or 3-digit serial number. Trailer coaches, driving coaches and centre coaches were designated with the letters VB, VS and VM. Examples are Classes VT 2.09 and VT 18.16.

So by 1970 the DR had three different classification systems.

== From 1 July 1970 ==
The conversion to computerised (EDP) numbers required six-figure numbers plus a check figure. Existing systems had to conform or new systems had to be introduced.

=== Steam locomotives ===
For the steam locomotives the previous class numbers remained largely unchanged and were left as two-digit numbers. Because, however, the first figure had to be a 1 for diesel locomotives and a 2 for electric locomotives, those classes affected had to be renumbered.

Example:

- 18 314, when computerised would have become 183 14.. and was therefore renumbered to 02 0314–1.

The following classes were changed:

- Class 18 to Class 02
- Class 19 to Class 04
- Class 22 to Class 39.10
- Class 23 to Class 35.20
- Class 23.10 to Class 35.10
- Class 24 to Class 37.10

The serial number which followed the two-digit class number was generally four digits long and the first one was used to distinguish between the different locomotive types.

The following rules applied to the serial numbers of standard gauge locomotives (Classes 01 to 98):

- leading 0: Locomotive with oil-firing
- leading 1: Locomotive with grate-firing
- leading 2: Locomotive with grate-firing where a leading 1 would cause confusion with other locomotives after renumbering (e.g. so that Class 03 locomotives would not be mixed up with Class 03.10 engines)
- leading 5: Locomotive with grate-firing, only for Class 38 to indicate former Saxon locomotives
- leading 8: Locomotive with grate-firing, only for Class 93.0-4
- leading 9: Locomotive with coal dust firing

The following rules applied to the serial numbers of narrow gauge locomotives (Class 99):

- leading 1: Locomotive with grate-firing, 750 mm gauge
- leading 2: Locomotive with grate-firing, 900 mm gauge
- leading 7: Locomotive with grate-firing, 1,000 mm gauge

Only grate-fired narrow gauge locomotives were renumbered, but if a narrow gauge locomotive was to be converted to oil-firing in subsequent years it would be given a:

- leading 0: Locomotive with oil-firing

In case an oil-fired locomotive was rebuilt to grate-firing, the first number was to be changed as follows:

- Class 44: from 0 to 2, where the original serial number was three digits
- Class 44: from 0 to 1, where the original serial number was four digits (and therefore a 1)
- Classes 01.5, 03.10 und 95: from 0 to 1
- Class 99: from 0 to the number before the conversion to oil-firing (i.e. the original number after EDP-renumbering).

=== Internal Combustion Engined Locomotives ===
The class numbers for internal combustion engined locomotives generally comprised 3 digits with a leading 1. The subsequent numbers were borrowed from their previous class numbers.

The serial numbers for internal combustion engined locomotives were retained as far as possible or reduced to the required three digits by dropping the first figure.

The small locomotives (Kleinlokomotiven) were given the class number 100. The serial numbers of locomotives in power group I were given a leading 0; power group II were given leading figures ranging from 1 to 7. The remaining small locomotives and narrow gauge locomotives were given a leading 9. In 1973 the narrow gauge engines were reclassified to Class 199.

On subsequent rebuilding the designation of locomotives was changed. This led to new classes being formed or sometimes just to the first digit of the serial number being changed.

=== Electric locomotives ===
The class numbers for electric locomotives generally consisted of 3 digits with a 2 as the first number. The following digits were borrowed from their previous class numbers.

To distinguish between different types, a 0, 2 or 9 was used as the leading digit of the 3-digit serial number.

=== Railcars ===
Railcar class numbers usually had 3 digits which started either with a 1 or a 2 depending on the type of traction.

For internal combustion engined railcars, the following system was chosen:

- 7 - Power, driving, trailer or centre cars produced by the GDR
- 8 - Power and centre cars of older types
- 9 - Driving and trailer cars of older types

Narrow-gauge and works railcars were organised into Classes 187 and 188.

To distinguish between the different types of railcar the serial numbers had a 0, 1 or 2 in the first position. Saloon railcars were given serial numbers from 251, centre wagons leading digits 3 to 5, driving cars 6 and 7 and trailers a number 8.

For electric railcars the following leading digits were used:

- 7 - DC, power, driving and trailer cars
- 8 - AC, driving and centre wagons

Classes 270–274 were intended for the new vehicles of the Berlin S-Bahn, classes 280–284 for the planned S-Bahnen in the regional cities. New railcars were to be allocated to classes 290–299.

To distinguish between types the serial numbers began with 0, 2 or 9. Power cars were given odd numbers and driving, centre and trailing cars, even numbers.

== Bibliography ==
- Wolfgang Valtin: Verzeichnis aller Lokomotiven und Triebwagen Bd. 1. transpress Berlin 1992, ISBN 3-344-70739-6
- Horst J. Obermayer, Manfred Weisbrod: Dampflok-Report Band Nr. 2. Hermann Merker Verlag Fürstenfeldbruck 1995, ISBN 3-922404-72-3

== See also ==
- History of rail transport in Germany
- Deutsche Reichsbahn (East Germany)
- UIC classification
