= SR locomotive numbering and classification =

A number of different numbering and classification schemes were used for the locomotives owned by the Southern Railway (SR) and its constituent companies. This page explains the principal systems that were used.

- For information about individual classes and locomotives, see: Locomotives of the Southern Railway

== Numbering ==
=== Post-grouping numbering ===
When the SR was created in 1923, it immediately set about finding a solution to the problem that many of its inherited locomotives carried the same numbers. The first solution, was to prefix all locomotive numbers with a letter derived from the first letter of the main locomotive works on each section of the SR. New locomotives were then given a prefixed number in the appropriate series for the area in which they worked. Later, the letter prefix was dropped and numbers were increased by a certain number of thousands, as follows:

- Ex-South Eastern and Chatham Railway: 'A' (for Ashford), later 1000 added
- Ex-London, Brighton and South Coast Railway: 'B' (for Brighton), later 2000 added
- Ex-London and South Western Railway: 'E' (for Eastleigh), later reverted to original numbers

The LSWR had renumbered its older locomotives into a 'duplicate list' series (for locomotives that were no longer in capital stock, but which were not yet life-expired) by adding '0' to the front of their original number (e.g. 0298). When the prefix letters were dropped by the SR, the surviving locomotives in this list had the '0' replaced with a '3' (e.g. 0298 became 3298).

An exception to this general arrangement was the numbering of locomotives on the Isle of Wight. Inherited locomotives and those transferred to the island by the SR were renumbered into a single list commencing at 1 and prefixed by the letter 'W' (for Wight).

From 1942, the SR adopted a numbering system for new-build locomotives (both steam and electric types) based on their wheel arrangement according to the UIC classification scheme, e.g., C1-40 (for the SR Class Q1 of forty 0-6-0 locomotives), etc. If the UIC classification was applied entirely correctly it would result in confusion on locomotives with trailing axles, since these are represented by a number. Therefore the SR put the unpowered axle counts first, then the driven axles, then the locomotive's unique number; for instance the SR-built Merchant Navy class was numbered 21C1-20 (two leading axles, one trailing axle, three driven axles, twenty locomotives). This system did not clearly distinguish between different classes of locomotives with the same wheel arrangement, although different blocks of numbers could be assigned - the subsequent Light Pacific classes had their numbers start at 21C101 and SR construction finished at 21C170. This approach was not retrospectively applied to older locomotives.

== Classification ==
=== Constituent companies ===
==== London & South Western Railway ====
From 1 January 1879 the principal LSWR works at Nine Elms (and, subsequently, Eastleigh) used an order number series that ran from A1 to Y1, then A2 to Y2, A3 to Y3 and so on (the letter I, J, Q, U, W and Z were omitted). The system was brought to the LSWR by William Adams from the Stratford Works of the Great Eastern Railway, where an almost identical system was in use from 1856 until after Grouping. This series was used for a myriad of items, including locomotives, but it was these numbers that were used to refer to locomotive classes. The highest-numbered locomotive class was 'H16'. The first three orders ('A1', 'B1', and 'C1') were for components: cylinders, tender wheels, and copper fireboxes respectively. The system was inconsistently applied with regard to the LSWR A12 class, for which the first batch was allocated the work number 'A12' in 1887, the second in 1888 was 'E1' and the third the following year was 'M2'. Even if 'A12' was a typographical error for 'A2', it should still have come after 'E1'.

Where more than one order number had been used for a given class, the first order number allocated was used to refer to the whole class: For instance, the 105 examples of the M7 Class were built over 15 years. The first order was for 25 locomotives and was works order number M7. The next order for 10 locomotives was order number V7 and construction continued across a further 13 batches until A15, all designated as M7s after the original order. Where locomotives were purchased from outside manufacturers, they were referred to by the number applied to the first class member. Self-evidently this meant there was no continuity in the LSWR locomotive classification system; save that if the letters be ignored, higher figures generally meant a more modern design.

=== Southern Railway ===
Perhaps because the focus of the SR was on electrification, no standard classification of steam locomotives was developed. Instead, the classes allocated by its pre-Grouping constituents were perpetuated and new locomotive types allocated classes accordingly.

Where SR-design classes were named, then the class was often referred to by the initials of the naming theme, e.g. 'BB' for Battle of Britain class, 'LN' for Lord Nelson class, 'MN' for Merchant Navy class, and 'WC' for 'West Country' class. This did not apply to the 'Schools' class however, which was SR Class V.
