= British diesel and electric multiple units =

British diesel and electric multiple units may refer to:

- British electric multiple units
- British railcars and diesel multiple units
