= Rolling stock of Network SouthEast =

Former British Rail sector

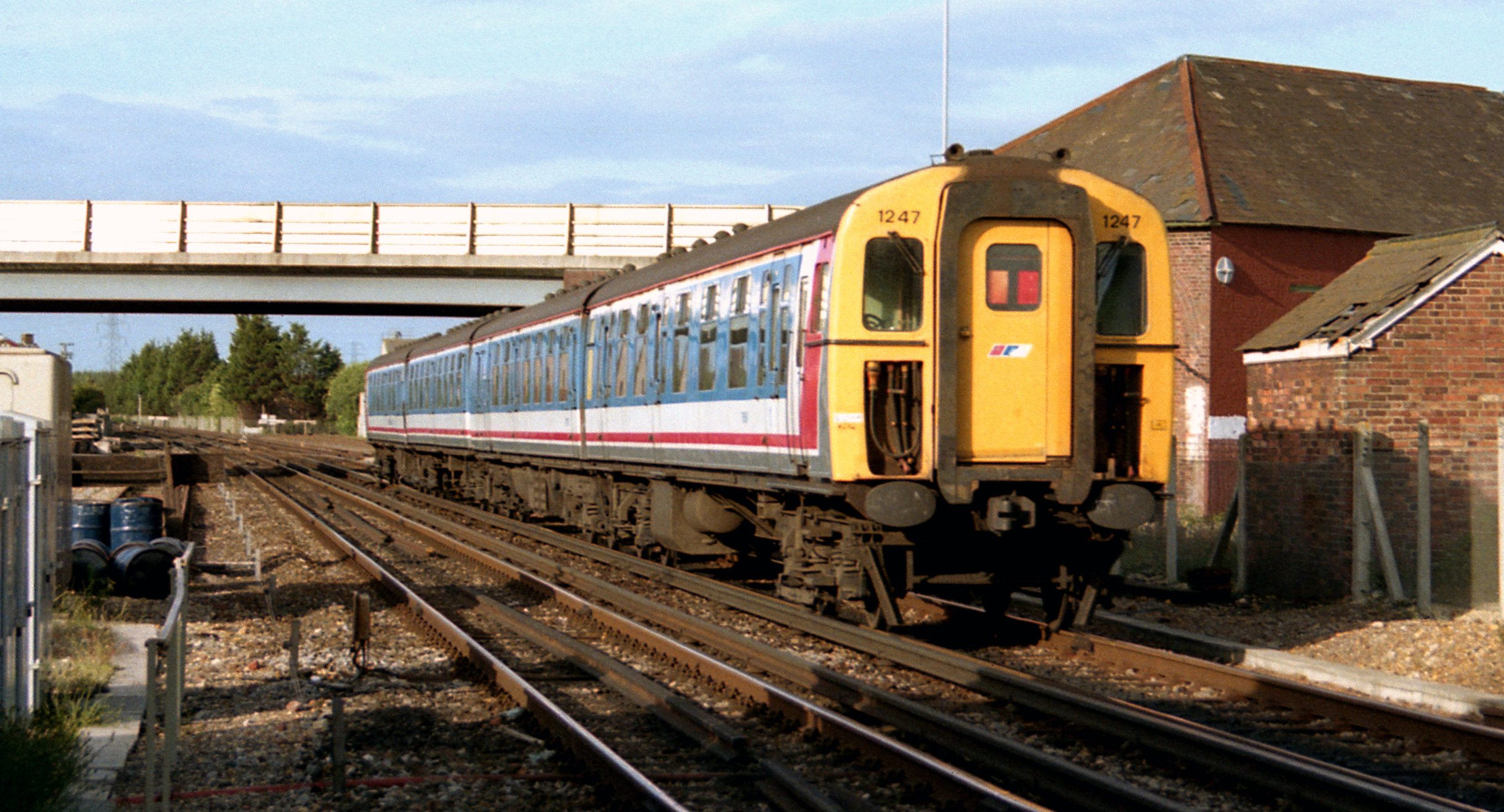
Network SouthEast inherited a large fleet of Class 421 (4CIG) electric multiple unit trains dating from the 1960s.

Network SouthEast (NSE), the sector of British Rail which ran passenger services in London and southeast England between 1986 and 1994, operated a wide variety of rolling stock during its existence. The majority of the network was electrified, and further electrification schemes took place during the 1986–1994 period; and the 7,000 vehicles owned by NSE in 1986 consisted of a mixture of electric, diesel-electric and diesel multiple units, diesel locomotives and the coaches they hauled.

Network SouthEast inherited a large fleet of electric multiple units (EMUs), smaller numbers of diesel (DMU) and diesel electric (DEMU) multiple units, and some diesel locomotives and coaching stock. Much of the fleet was introduced after the 1955 Modernisation Plan; stock was old (some dated from before World War II) and in variable condition, giving a "drab" and "uninspiring" appearance, and was difficult to convert to driver-only operation. Accordingly, the sector invested in many new vehicles during its eight-year history. After initial problems, the Networker range of units proved very successful and is still used across southeast England on the privatised rail network. The same applies to the innovative Class 319 dual-voltage units, built for NSE's new Thameslink service which operated on two incompatible types of electrified line.

== Overview ==
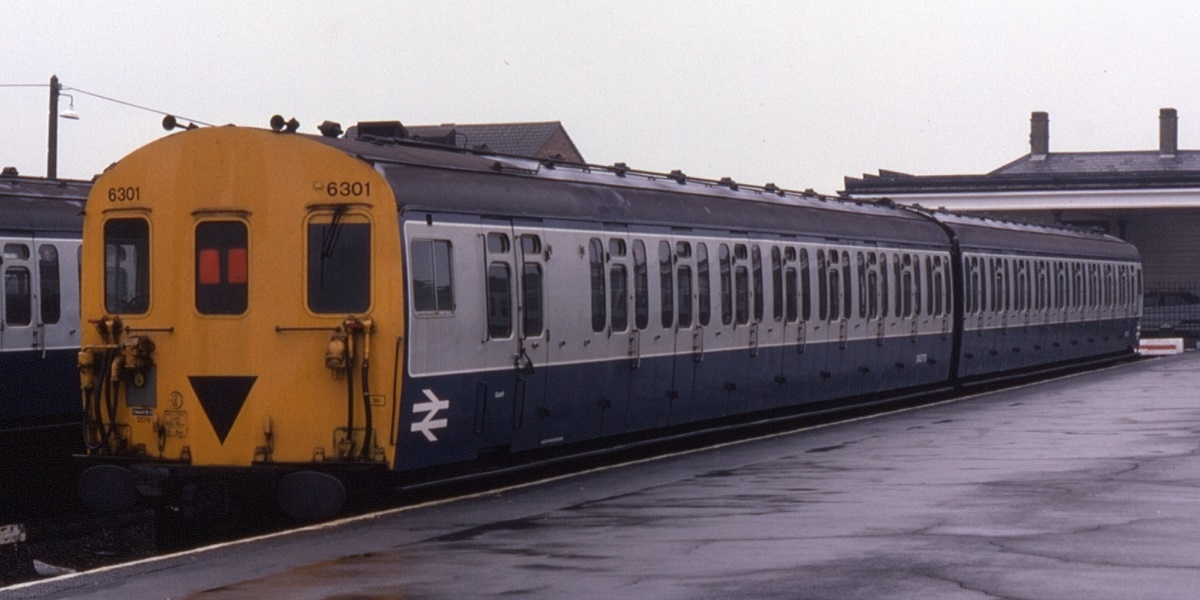
Network SouthEast inherited more than 7,000 vehicles, many "drab" and ageing. This Class 416 unit in British Rail blue and grey livery stands at Tattenham Corner in spring 1984.

The London & South East Sector (L&SE) was created in 1982 when British Rail underwent the process of sectorisation. During the four-year life of this sector—Network SouthEast's immediate predecessor—the number of passenger-carrying vehicles allocated to it was reduced steadily as timetables were adapted in response to a decline in demand caused by the recession. In May 1984 L&SE operated 7,465 vehicles, which was to be reduced to 7,050 by the start of 1986. The NSE era started in June 1986 when the LS&E sector was rebranded, at which point it owned 7,004 vehicles. Of these, the great majority (6,080) were EMU coaches: about 68% of the network's 2,000 route mileage was electrified. There were 489 DMU/DEMU coaches, 57 locomotives and 435 coaches hauled by locomotives. Public address systems and power-assisted sliding doors were available on 51% and 23% of vehicles respectively, and the fleet had a mean age of 24 years. NSE's investment in new coaching stock, refurbishment of existing stock and electrification of routes changed all of these figures over the course of the sector's eight-year existence. By 1990, NSE had nearly 100 more EMU coaches but fewer DMUs and a near-halving of locomotive-hauled stock; and 80% of carriages had a public address system and 33% featured sliding doors.

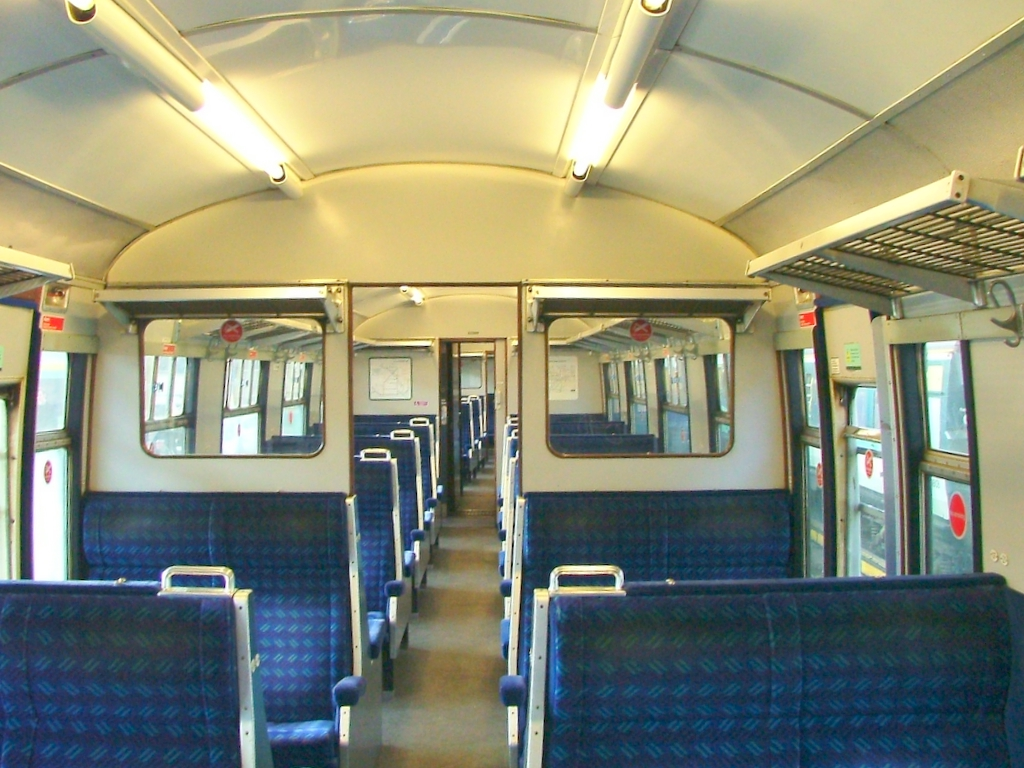
NSE refreshed train interiors (Class 421 vehicle pictured) with blue patterned seating, pale plastic panelling and strip lighting.

By the end of the NSE era in 1994, the sector had acquired 3,020 new coaches and had overhauled a further 2,578. Refurbishment ranged from the "small but important" work undertaken on the Class 487 Waterloo & City line units, funded by City of London-based firm Allied Lyons, to the £17 million spent on the 1,570-coach Class 423 fleet. Except for the small fleet of Class 487 units built in 1940 for the Waterloo & City line and some older ex-London Underground stock cascaded to the Island Line on the Isle of Wight, the oldest EMUs were the hundreds of Class 415 and 416 (EPB) units built in the 1950s (the oldest units dated from 1951 and 1950 respectively). Throughout the LS&E and NSE eras there were more than 800 of these vehicles in service: 139 4-coach Class 415 units and 126 of the 2-coach Class 416s. Some of the oldest examples had underframes reused from interwar stock.

Network SouthEast's fleet of EMUs featured seven different body designs, from 1930s styles based on stock designed by Oliver Bulleid to the "modernistic but attractive" lightweight aluminium Networker range designed "from the ground up" by NSE's own design team. Most vehicles were based on British Rail's standardised Mark 1, Mark 2 and Mark 3 carriages, but there were variations in construction materials (welded steel panels, or steel or aluminium bodies of integral construction), door types (slam-doors or automatic sliding doors), underframe styles, cab fronts and internal layouts. NSE put great emphasis on interior design and the application of its standard livery. Rolling stock of all types was painted in the network's "house colours" of red, white blue and grey horizontal bands, swept up diagonally at the end of each unit. Compared to this bold, bright exterior decoration—popularly likened to toothpaste because of its striped pattern—interiors were plainer and more "restful", featuring grey, blue or white plastic panelling, blue seat moquette and fluorescent strip lights. Most stock had open (saloon-style) seating by the start of the NSE era, but some First Class compartments survived throughout the period.

Most EMUs had one of two incompatible forms of electric traction equipment: 750 volts DC (direct current) or 25,000 volts AC (alternating current). The Class 313 and 319 units were used on routes with both AC and DC electrification and were therefore equipped for both systems. (Note: Class 313 units were used on Northern City line services from Moorgate - Stevenage/Welwyn Garden City where the change from AC to Dc traction took place at Drayton Park and Class 319 units were built for the new Thameslink (Bedford–Brighton/Sevenoaks/Sutton) services via Farringdon, where the change from AC to DC traction or vice versa took place during the station stop at Farringdon.) Units equipped for DC traction collected electrical current from a third rail using a collector shoe attached to their bogies, which were in turn connected to traction motors (mostly built in the 1950s, even those used on newer stock). AC-powered EMUs collected power from overhead lines using a pantograph. Standard across NSE's fleet were electropneumatic brakes and either semi-automatic Buckeye couplers or (on some later units) fully automatic couplers.

== Networker family of trains ==
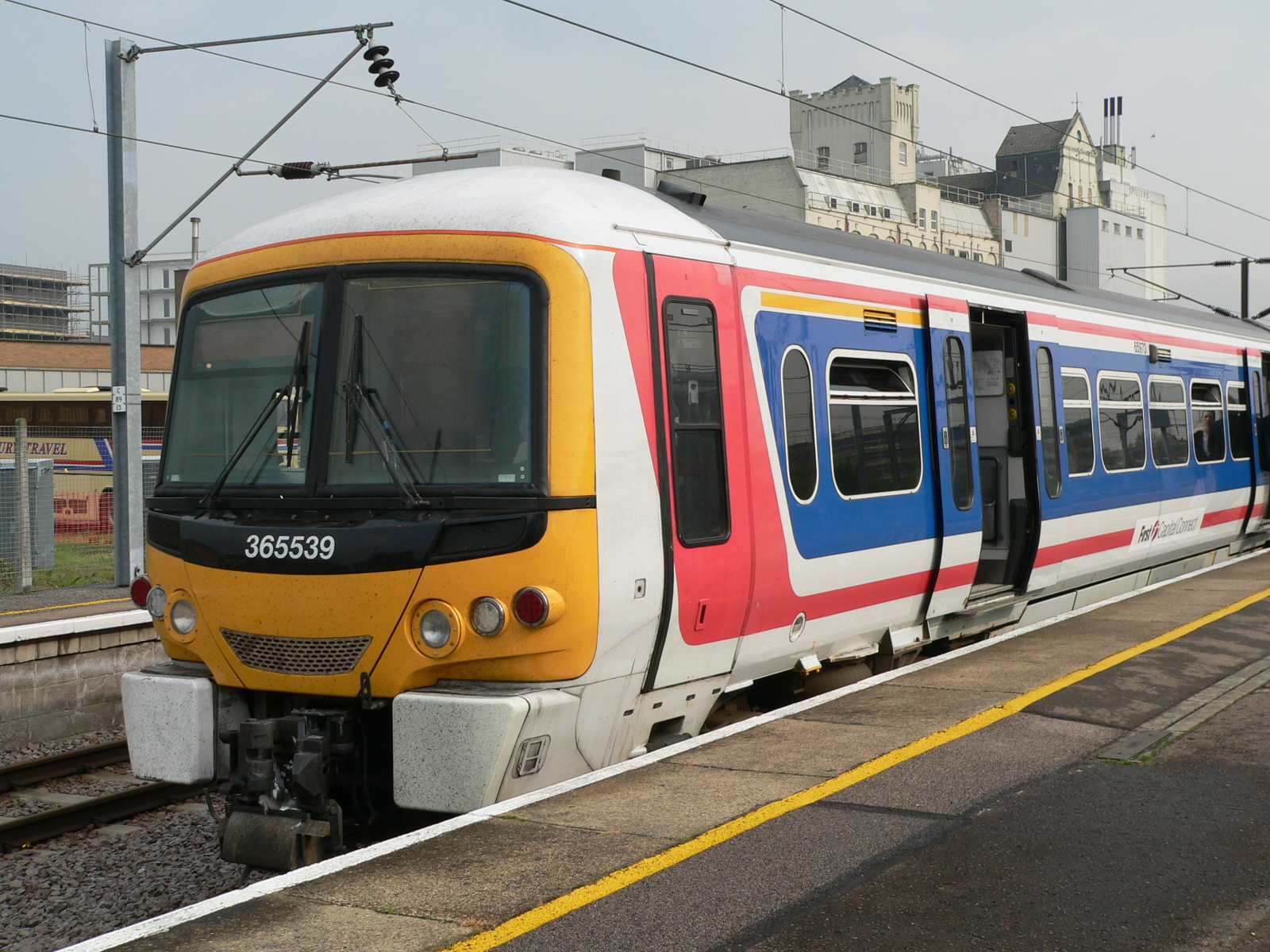
The "Networker" family included Class 365 (pictured), 165, 166, 465 and 466 units, all manufactured in the early 1990s.

Network SouthEast was launched to the public on 10 June 1986 by its director Chris Green. One of his promises at that time was "a new concept for suburban rail travel around London"—the Networker train. This would be a family of closely related classes of diesel and electric rolling stock which shared design and engineering features such as lightweight aluminium alloy bodywork (instead of steel), fully automatic couplings, computer-controlled traction motors, passenger-operated sliding doors and new high-backed seating laid out to give more space around the doors. The diesel version of the train was named the "Network Turbo".

A British Rail research team at Derby Works was developing a concept called the "Advanced Suburban Train" in the mid-1980s, based around innovations such as AC traction motors (smaller, lighter and more reliable than direct current-operated motors) and light aluminium bodies. After visiting Derby in 1986 and investigating the concept, Green committed to buying large numbers of the trains (to be called "Networkers") for NSE in two stages. The first batch would be delivered in 1990, then a second batch incorporating extra technical innovations would be bought in 1993. Until the Networkers were ready, NSE would continue to procure steel-bodied trains to replace ageing stock.

It was decided that the fleet of electric Networkers would replace the entire fleet of ageing slam-door trains on the inner suburban routes of southeast London and Kent. A prototype test train, allocated the TOPS classification Class 457, was built in 1988 and undertook extensive testing from June of that year. The interior design and fittings were comprehensively reviewed and revised at the same time: for example, Network SouthEast arranged with the Job Centre in Dartford to borrow all of its applicants for three days to test the efficiency of embarkation and disembarkation through the newly designed push-button sliding doors. Meanwhile, a full-size wooden mock-up of a Networker was unveiled at the end of 1987 at London Victoria by Secretary of State for Transport Paul Channon. In August 1989 a £690 million contract was signed for the delivery of 842 vehicles and the construction of a maintenance and storage depot at Slade Green near Dartford. The Class 465 and 466 units (the latter identical to the more numerous 465s, but built by Metro Cammell at Washwood Heath) were delivered on 19 December 1991, just before Chris Green left NSE to join the InterCity sector.

Meanwhile, NSE placed smaller orders for Networker variants which could run on other parts of the network. The Class 165 and 166 "Networker Turbo" units—the first of which were delivered in September 1991, before the Class 465 and 466 stock—were diesel units with slightly longer bodies and based on technology used in British Rail's long established Sprinter trains. They were used on the Chiltern Main Line and (from 1992) the Great Western Main Line and its branches, where they proved to be much quicker and more reliable than the old diesel units they replaced. Overall 78 vehicles went to Chiltern and 174 to the Great Western routes out of London Paddington and the North Downs Line. Then 164 dual-voltage Class 365 units were built for Liverpool Street–King's Lynn (Fen Line) services and long-distance services in Kent; the last units in these classes entered service just before the end of the NSE era in 1994.

Other Networker-style units were proposed and in some cases mocked up or built as prototypes. Trains based on the Networker design were intended for the London, Tilbury and Southend line; the planned Heathrow Express and Crossrail routes; (Note: Both schemes were eventually built after privatisation and with new rolling stock not based on the Networker concept.) the Thameslink route; long-distance non-electrified routes such as the West of England Main Line; and long-distance electrified routes. Each was allocated a provisional TOPS classification, but none were ever built—although mock-ups of some units were still in public view until 1992. After the recession of the early 1990s and the announcement that Britain's rail network would be privatised, "the Networker revolution faced sudden death".

== Nicknames ==
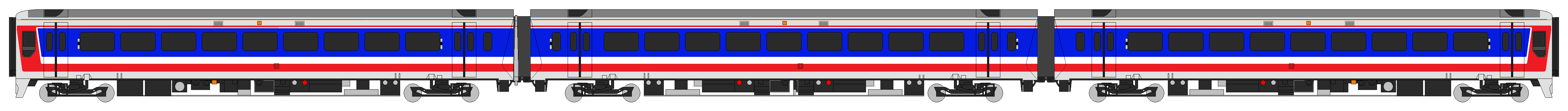
NSE's striped livery was likened to toothpaste.

Rail enthusiasts, staff and the general public gave nicknames to several types of rolling stock based on their appearance or characteristics. The single-coach Class 121 units used on routes out of Paddington and Marylebone were known as "Bubble cars"—a name which has become official since a former operator Chiltern Railways obtained and refurbished one to work on services between Princes Risborough and Aylesbury. The Class 205 diesel-electric units used on the Marshlink Line and Uckfield line had a distinctive low-frequency engine noise and were nicknamed "Thumpers". The Class 206 "Tadpole" units associated with the Hastings Line were so called because of their unusual profile: they were built from the driving car of Class 201 units and narrower driving trailers from redundant Class 416 stock. In reference to a British television gameshow 3-2-1 and its anthropomorphic dustbin mascot, Class 321 units were nicknamed "Dusty Bins".

Rolling stock of all ages and types was painted in Network SouthEast's livery, made up of horizontal stripes of its house colours of red, white, blue and grey. From the solebar upwards, the stripes were grey, white, red, white, blue (the thickest stripe, around the windows and doors), white and red. Much brighter shades of red and blue, and paler grey paint, were used from late 1987. "Bright", "brash" and "garish" in contrast to British Rail's sober dark blues and greys, it was nicknamed the "toothpaste" livery.

== List of rolling stock ==
- Stock is shown in ascending order of class number, as assigned by the TOPS classification scheme.
- Some classes of rolling stock used during the NSE era are still in use by the privatised train operating companies which succeeded it. These are identified by a dagger symbol (†) in the "Class" column.
- Not all images show stock in Network SouthEast livery.
- The "Built" column gives the year in which the first units in this class were built.

Class	Type	Image	Built	Notes	Refs
03	Diesel shunter		1957	Shunters at Ryde depot on the Isle of Wight.	
05	Diesel shunter		1955	Shunter at Ryde depot on the Isle of Wight, where it earned the nickname "Nuclear Fred".	
08†	Diesel shunter		1952	Examples include: 08 600 'Ivor' (97800); 08 631 'Eagle'; 08 641 'Dartmoor'	
33	Diesel		1960		
47	Diesel		1962		
50	Diesel		1967		
73†	Electro-diesel		1965		
86	Electric		1965		
101	DMU		1956	These units were cascaded to southeast England in the 1980s from other parts of the BR network. With two doors on each side per carriage, the boarding and alighting of large numbers of passengers was inconvenient. In the NSE era three-coach units were used on the North Downs Line and two-coach trains on branch lines in Berkshire and Essex. All units were withdrawn in the early 1990s.	
104	DMU		1957	By 1990, "particularly poor" seating in "dingy saloons" meant these Birmingham-built trains had a short life. NSE inherited 20 vehicles (formed into ten two-coach sets) and had halved their number by 1994. The Gospel Oak to Barking line and the lines out of Paddington and Marylebone used these trains, which could reach 75 miles per hour (121 km/h).	
108	DMU		1958	Nine of these two-coach units survived until after 1990 on the Marston Vale Line (Bedford–Bletchley) and on the short-lived extension to Kettering and Corby. They saw occasional use on the Chiltern Line out of Marylebone as well. Known as "Derby Lightweights" because of their place and style of construction, they resembled Class 101 units.	
115	DMU		1960	Throughout their working life—which ended in 1991, apart from occasional journeys, when Class 165 units were introduced—these trains were used solely on the Chiltern Line from Marylebone. NSE inherited a fleet of 23 four-coach units, which had a generous provision of doors but no gangways as standard (some units had them retrofitted). The last unit ran on 29 July 1992 on an evening service to Aylesbury and displayed a commemorative headboard.	
117	DMU		1959	These were used almost exclusively on routes out of London Paddington. By the NSE era, 30 three-coach units survived; all remained in service until Class 165 stock was brought in on these routes during 1992. High-density seating and doors in each bay made them ideal for suburban workings. One unit was also used to supplement Class 108s on the short-lived and "rather makeshift" (Bletchley–Bedford—)Kettering–Corby shuttle service, launched experimentally with local council funding in 1987 and withdrawn three years later.	
119	DMU		1959	"Particularly sumptuous seating" in a spacious layout and "vast [van] space" characterised these three-coach units, eight of which were used on North Downs Line services until just before the end of the NSE era: their luggage capacity made them ideal for Gatwick Airport traffic on that route.	
121	DMU		1959	These were similar to Class 117 stock in many ways: the same builder (Pressed Steel Co., Linwood), same appearance, same area of operation and same fate (replaced by Class 165 units). The main difference was that they were single coaches. By 1990, just before their withdrawal, 11 survived.	
159†	DMU		1990	The locomotives used on the West of England Main Line services between London Waterloo and Exeter were life-expired and unreliable by the early 1990s. Meanwhile, the Regional Railways sector had committed to ordering more new Class 158 units than it needed. In 1990 NSE was able to acquire 66 coaches built for this order; after minor changes and a redesignation to Class 159, they entered service in the first week of 1993.	
165†	DMU		1991	The diesel version of the Networker concept was launched on the Thames and Chiltern routes (from Paddington and Marylebone) from 1991. The fleet size was 204 coaches formed in two- or three-coach units: both types could be found on the Paddington routes, and these were capable of 90 mph running, while on Marylebone routes the trains were two coaches only and were limited to 75 mph. Perkins Engines supplied the 350 hp engines.	
166†	DMU		1992		
201	DEMU		1957	A small number of units in this fleet survived until the start of the NSE era, serving the Hastings Line. This had been electrified with effect from 27 April 1986, (Note: A "Gala Day" of special services was held on this date, Queen Elizabeth The Queen Mother attended the official launch on 6 May, and the new service officially started on 12 May.) just before Network SouthEast was launched, and EMUs eventually replaced all of these narrow-bodied diesel-electric units.	
202	DEMU		1957	Like the Class 201 units, these had six coaches and were built in 1957 for the Hastings Line, which had narrow tunnels necessitating special narrow-bodied stock. Together with the Class 201 and 203 trains, these were known as the "Hastings Diesels". Six units survived until the start of the NSE era.	
203	DEMU		1957	Four of these five-coach units, which apart from their length were identical to Class 201 and 202 stock, were still in use on the Hastings Line when Network SouthEast was launched, but electric multiple units soon supplanted them after the route was electrified in spring 1986. The units had a top speed of 90 mph.	
204	DEMU		1957	As with the other "Hastings Units", a small number of vehicles survived for a short time at the start of the NSE era.	
205	DEMU		1957	Known as "Thumpers" because of the noise of their English Electric four-cylinder engines, these 75 mph trains were introduced to lines in Hampshire but were later used all over southeast England, including occasionally on long-distance services for which they were poorly suited. They were almost identical to, but slower than, Class 414 EMUs.	
206	DEMU		1957	The so-called "Tadpole" units were nicknamed for the different widths of their ex-Class 201 driving cars and the narrower two-coach driving trailers taken from Class 416 stock. Six were inherited by NSE in 1986; they were used on the Hastings and Marshlink Lines for a short time before they were withdrawn from service.	
207	DEMU		1962	By 1990 there were only eight of these three-coach units left; 19 were built originally. They were designed for services in the Kent and East Sussex area which needed to use the Three Bridges to Tunbridge Wells Central Line, which had a narrow tunnel; accordingly they had narrower bodies and fewer seats. A few operated in Hampshire during the NSE era.	
302	EMU		1956	These were built for the London, Tilbury & Southend route at Doncaster and York and received midlife refurbishments before the NSE era, including the retrofitting of gangways. NSE inherited 200 coaches. Later used on the Great Eastern lines as well, the "chronically unreliable units" were used throughout the NSE era and were not replaced until 2000.	
305	EMU		1960	Two sub-classes were built in 1960: 305/1 for inner suburban services from Liverpool Street station, and 305/2 for longer-distance traffic. Both were capable of 75 mph, had "attractive low-backed seating" and a distinctive driving cab, and lacked gangway connections. By the NSE era they were used only at peak times when not enough Class 315s were available.	
307	EMU		1956	NSE inherited a stock of 32 four-coach Class 307 units, which were used exclusively on the Great Eastern route out of Liverpool Street, and got rid of all of them by 1990. The trains had a top speed of 75 mph. "Past their sell-by date, [they] broke down every 5,000 miles" and had to be replaced as quickly as possible.	
308	EMU		1959	NSE had 33 of these units, each of four coaches. They were the same as the Class 305/2 stock and were also used for longer-distance suburban work, although during the NSE era they worked out of Fenchurch Street on the London Tilbury & Southend route. They were only classified with a different TOPS number because they had different traction motors (from English Electric rather than GEC).	
309	EMU		1962	British Rail's first 100 mph EMUs were used on the main lines out of Liverpool Street to places such as Harwich, Norwich and Clacton-on-Sea. By 1990, 23 4-coach units were still in service with NSE. Apart from the cab front, they were very similar to Class 411 stock. During mid-life refurbishment at Wolverton Works, a few units were painted in "Jaffa cake" livery, (Note: A short-lived British Rail corporate livery used by NSE's predecessor, the London & South East Sector, on trains used on certain long-distance routes. From the solebar upwards, the livery consisted of grey/fawn, orange and dark brown bands of unequal width.) but all bore NSE colours by 1990.	
310	EMU		1965	Described as "the AC version of the ubiquitous Class 423 units", which ran on third rail (Direct current) electrified lines south of London, this fleet of 38 four-coach units were used on London Euston—Northampton services until 1988, when NSE transferred them to the routes from Liverpool Street to Essex. Their "stylish" wrap-around windscreens were distinctive. All survived beyond the NSE era.	
312	EMU		1975	A later date of manufacture, flat windscreens and a top speed of 90 mph distinguished these trains from the 75 mph Class 310 trains, to which they were otherwise identical. From 1988, all 49 four-coach units were used on the lines out of Liverpool Street; until then some worked on the Great Northern routes out of Kings Cross.	
313	EMU		1976	When the Great Northern suburban routes to Kings Cross and Moorgate were electrified in the late 1970s, this batch of 64 three-coach units was built to work them. They had sliding doors controlled by the driver after an early experiment with a "rather peculiar form of passenger-controlled" doors. During the NSE era the trains generally worked peak-hour services only. The last sets in service were with Southern and were withdrawn in May 2023.	
315	EMU		1980	These were introduced in 1980 to replace 1940s-built Class 306 units on the lines out of Liverpool Street. The 64-unit fleet had aluminium bodywork, sliding doors, a 75 mph top speed and a "modern appearance" which was similar to the Class 313. Like those units, they were also Standard Class only and had no toilets. The last Class 315s were withdrawn from service on 8 December 2022.	
317	EMU		1981	This 100 mph, 72-unit fleet sat unused for two years because of a DOO dispute; and their design was criticised upon their introduction in the early 1980s. They had a steel Mark 3 bodyshell, a cab "of most peculiar appearance" and unusual window openings. Inside, the poorly fitting parts looked like they were "designed by a colour-blind metalworker with a grudge", to one contemporary report. The units were refurbished during the NSE era. The last Class 317s were withdrawn from service in July 2022.	
319	EMU		1987	Initially 46 four-coach units were ordered, but in May 1987 this was revised to 60 because passenger numbers on the London St Pancras–Bedford route were growing rapidly. The first unit was delivered on 2 September 1987, and the final cost of the order was £75 million. A few Class 319 stock survives in the former NSE region working on West Midlands Trains service out of Euston, since Thameslink withdrew the last of its units on 27 August 2017. From 2015, a number of units were transferred to Northern Rail for use on services in the North West.	
321	EMU		1988	The contract for 46 units to replace life-expired stock on the Great Eastern Main Line was signed off in September 1987—one of NSE's first rolling stock orders. By 1990, 114 units (each of four coaches) had been delivered and they were also in service on the West Anglia Main Line and West Coast Main Line for services to Northampton via the Northampton Loop. They were based on the Class 319 design but had a different front end reminiscent of EMUs used on the SNCF network in France. A grey internal colour scheme resulted in a "rather murky ambience". The 10 remaining complete Class 321 units are currently owned by and in service with Varamis Rail for parcels services.	
322	EMU		1990	Five units of four cars each were built for the Stansted Express service—a non-stop shuttle train between Liverpool Street and London Stansted Airport. The rail link to the new Stansted Airport station opened in May 1991. They were identical to Class 321 units except for their more spacious interior layout, with fewer seats and more luggage space, and their unique livery: mostly white, with horizontal stripes of green and grey, a large "Stansted Express" logo and the logos of Network SouthEast and the British Airports Authority (BAA). The stock was owned by BAA. The units were used in revenue-earning service from late 1990 on the West Anglia Main Line until the new rail link was completed. All were scrapped in 2022.	
365	EMU		1994	The last new units to be delivered in the NSE era, these four-coach trains were high-speed "Express"-branded variants of the Networker concept, capable of 100 mph running. The order for 41 units (164 coaches) was divided between two routes: 25 units went to the lengthy line to Cambridge and King's Lynn, one of NSE's northern outposts, while the other 16 replaced slam-door stock on certain suburban and longer-distance services in Kent. The last Class 365 were withdrawn from service on 15 May 2021, one unit is preserved the rest have been scrapped.	
411	EMU		1956	The Kent Coast lines were electrified by British Railways as part of the 1955 Modernisation Plan, and these units were built between 1956 and 1961 to operate services on them. They were of "extremely conservative design", derived from 1930s 4COR stock, and worked in Kent until well after privatisation. Each unit was of four coaches, and 120 units were built. They were refurbished at Swindon Works between 1980 and early 1984. When used on boat trains to Dover Western Docks, they often ran in formation with a NSE-liveried Class 419 motor luggage van to give extra capacity for baggage and mail.	
412	EMU		1956	These were built alongside the Class 411 units and were identical except for the inclusion of a buffet car. Until the early-1980s refit there were 22 4-coach units of this configuration, but 15 had their buffet facilities removed at that time and were reclassified as Class 411. The remaining seven units were used on the Portsmouth Direct Line during the Network SouthEast era. In 1989 they were refitted with the most modern bogies as part of NSE's investment in improved services on that route.	
413	EMU		1958	These units (22 of which were in service at the start of the NSE era, with some scrapped in 1990) were classified with this number in 1979 when they were formed from pairs of Class 414 two-car units coupled end-on and slightly reconfigured internally. In 1984 they moved from Coastway services in Sussex to suburban Kent, where they continued to operate in NSE days until Networkers superseded them.	
414	EMU		1959	Built in the late 1950s and early 1960s for mainline duties in Kent, these 90 mph two-coach EMUs were outdated and "anachronistic" by the time Network SouthEast was formed, when they were used on the South West Main Line from London Waterloo. The 23 units were refurbished in the early 1990s.	
415	EMU		1950	These four-coach trains were also known as 4EPB units in reference to their electropneumatic brakes. As the first Southern Region units to be so equipped, they were "revolutionary"—but their appearance was old-fashioned, based on the pre-war 4SUB units, and bogies and some other parts were recycled from pre-war stock. The fleet (which numbered around 200 in 1990) were overhauled in 1984, removing compartments and adding better heating and lighting and public address systems.	
416	EMU		1954	These had two coaches but were otherwise identical to the four-car Class 415 units. Built at Eastleigh Works in two batches—100 units in 1954 and 34 in 1959—almost all survived well into the NSE era. They had a top speed of 75 mph, like all but a small subclass of the Class 415 units which were upgraded for 90 mph running.	
418	EMU		1976	This class was formed in 1974 and 1976 when certain Class 414 units of 1950s vintage had their First Class accommodation removed. By the time NSE launched, 31 two-coach units (all from the 1976 conversion programme) were still in service; they continued in use on inner suburban services in south London until shortly before privatisation.	
421	EMU		1964	The first units in this class were built in 1964 and they entered service the following year on the Brighton Main Line. By the NSE era they also worked on main-line services out of London Waterloo (the units used for these workings were built in the early 1970s, to the same design as the earlier stock but with more modest levels of interior trim). Capable of 90 mph running, they remained in use until the early 21st century. There were 133 4-coach units in service in 1990.	
422	EMU		1964	This class consisted of 18 four-coach units which were identical to Class 421 vehicles except for the inclusion of a buffet car in the third coach. Some worked on London Waterloo services until 1983–84, when they were transferred to the Brighton Main Line where the rest of the fleet operated. Some units had their buffet facilities removed during refurbishment in the late 1980s and were reclassified as Class 421 accordingly.	
423	EMU		1967	"The ubiquitous Class 423" was used on all parts of NSE's DC-traction (third rail) network. In 1990 there were 195 units in service, each of four coaches, with a maximum speed of 90 mph. Construction started in 1967 with a batch of 20 for the South West Main Line, which had just been electrified, and continued until 1974 (these later units operated in the Kent area). Every set of seats (laid out in 3x3 and 2x2 formation with an aisle between) had its own door: this was the main visual difference between these units and Class 421/422 vehicles, which had doors only at each end of every coach. The fleet was refurbished from 1988 at Eastleigh Works.	
432	EMU		1967	NSE had 15 of these four-coach units for use on the South West Main Line to Bournemouth prior to the electrification onward to Weymouth. The units were coupled to Class 438 "4TC" (Trailer Control) units, which were carried forward from Bournemouth behind a Class 33 diesel-electric locomotive.	
438	EMU		1967	These four-coach units, originally designated Class 491, ran in single- or double-set formation behind Class 430 units between London Waterloo and Bournemouth, then behind a locomotive as far as Weymouth (or, on occasion, Weymouth Quay—the town's dedicated boat train station). They were superseded by Class 442 "Wessex Electrics" stock from 1988. They also operated on Waterloo–Salisbury services until May 1989 and certain West of England Main Line services until July 1993.	
442	EMU		1988	NSE ordered 24 Class 442 "Wessex Electrics" units in 1988 for the South West Main Line electrification scheme which was completed that year. Although of "sleek" modern appearance—they were based on up-to-date British Rail Mark 3 coaching stock, and had features such as concealed lighting and full air-conditioning—mechanically they were "entirely traditional". Their traction motors were recycled from withdrawn Class 432 units, for example. Other internal features included disabled toilets, payphones and a buffet with a lounge area in the centre coach of the five-coach units. The last Class 442 units were scrapped between 2020 and 2021 with only one carriage preserved.	
455	EMU		1983	The mainstay of NSE's South Western Lines network are still used on the same routes out of London Waterloo as of 2017 by privatised operator South Western Railway. From 1985 some were transferred to London Victoria and London Bridge suburban services. Overall, 137 four-coach units were in use during the NSE era. Poor build quality and design flaws affected the earliest units, but several changes (including to the front ends) were made to later batches. The units operated by Southern were withdrawn and scrapped in 2022.	
456	EMU		1991	These were built at York Works in 1991 after the Class 319 and 321 construction programme finished. The bodies were based on those units, but the couplings were designed so that the 24 two-coach units could be coupled to Class 455 stock if required. NSE specified that toilets should be installed, unlike on Class 455 trains over which the sector had no design influence. All Class 456 units were scrapped in 2022.	
465†	EMU		1991	NSE began the Networker tendering process in April 1988, Transport Secretary Cecil Parkinson authorised the first part of the order (built by British Rail Engineering Limited) in August 1989, and the earliest coaches entered service in 1991. Formed into four-coach units, they were used on the Kent Link and South London Lines divisions as a replacement for Class 415 and 416 stock.	
466†	EMU		1993	NSE was required to offer the Networker contract to more than one company, so Metro Cammell of Washwood Heath (Note: Owned by GEC Alsthom at the time.) built the second set of Networkers which entered service in 1993 and 1994, just before NSE ceased to exist. Some were delivered in two-coach formation and were designated as Class 466.	
482	EMU		1992	The "small size and specialised nature of the fleet" meant that the Class 487 units used on the Waterloo & City line were difficult to replace. In 1992, ten units of two coaches each were constructed to a design based on the London Underground 1992 Stock built at the same time for the Central Line of the Underground. Both orders were fulfilled by British Rail Engineering Limited (BREL). (Note: BREL was bought out in 1989 by a consortium including the ABB Group, which later acquired the whole company.) After testing and painting in NSE livery, they entered service in July 1993.	
483	EMU		1938	To replace the Class 485 units used on the Island Line since 1967, British Rail bought ten two-coach sets of redundant 1930s London Underground stock in October 1988. After extensive refurbishment at Eastleigh Works, they were put into service from July 1989. Acceleration and ride quality were better than their 1920s predecessors, and the units were given modern fittings.	
485	EMU		1923	NSE inherited the Island Line—a detached branch line running between Ryde and Shanklin on the Isle of Wight—and its stock of ancient ex-London Underground trains. Classified as Class 485 after being brought to the island in 1967, they had to be used because Ryde Tunnel was too small for full-size rolling stock. They were meant to be a temporary solution with a lifespan of up to 10 years, but the last units were withdrawn in 1990. Class 483 units replaced them.	
487	EMU		1940	The Waterloo & City line, a deep-level tube, was operated by British Rail from its opening in 1900 until 1994, when it was transferred from Network SouthEast to London Underground. The original (1900) stock was used until 1940, when these units were built to replace them; NSE inherited 12 motor coaches and 16 unpowered (trailer) coaches. They were refurbished and painted in the NSE livery in 1987 with funding help from Allied Lyons, whose logo was also applied to coach exteriors. They were characterised by a rough and noisy ride. Class 482 units replaced them.	

== See also ==
- British Rail locomotive and multiple unit numbering and classification
- Slam door trains

== Bibliography ==
- Brown, David; Jackson, Alan A. (1990). The Network SouthEast Handbook. Harrow Weald: Capital Transport Publishing. ISBN 185414-129-5.
- Glover, John (2001). Southern Electric. Hersham: Ian Allan Publishing. ISBN 0-7110-2807-9.
- Green, Chris; Vincent, Mike (2014). The Network SouthEast Story 1982–2014. Hersham: Oxford Publishing Co. ISBN 978-0-86093-653-4.
- Hardy, Brian (2002) [1976]. London Underground Rolling Stock (15th ed.). Harrow Weald: Capital Transport. ISBN 1-85414-263-1.
- Marsden, Colin J. (1983). Southern Rails in the 1980s. Shepperton: Ian Allan Ltd. ISBN 0-7110-1331-4.
- Morrison, Brian; Brunt, Ken (1991). No. 7: North East, East and South East London. British Railways Past and Present. Great Addington: Silver Link Publishing Ltd. ISBN 0-947971-55-6.
