= British railcars and diesel multiple units =

Classes of British self-powered diesel trains

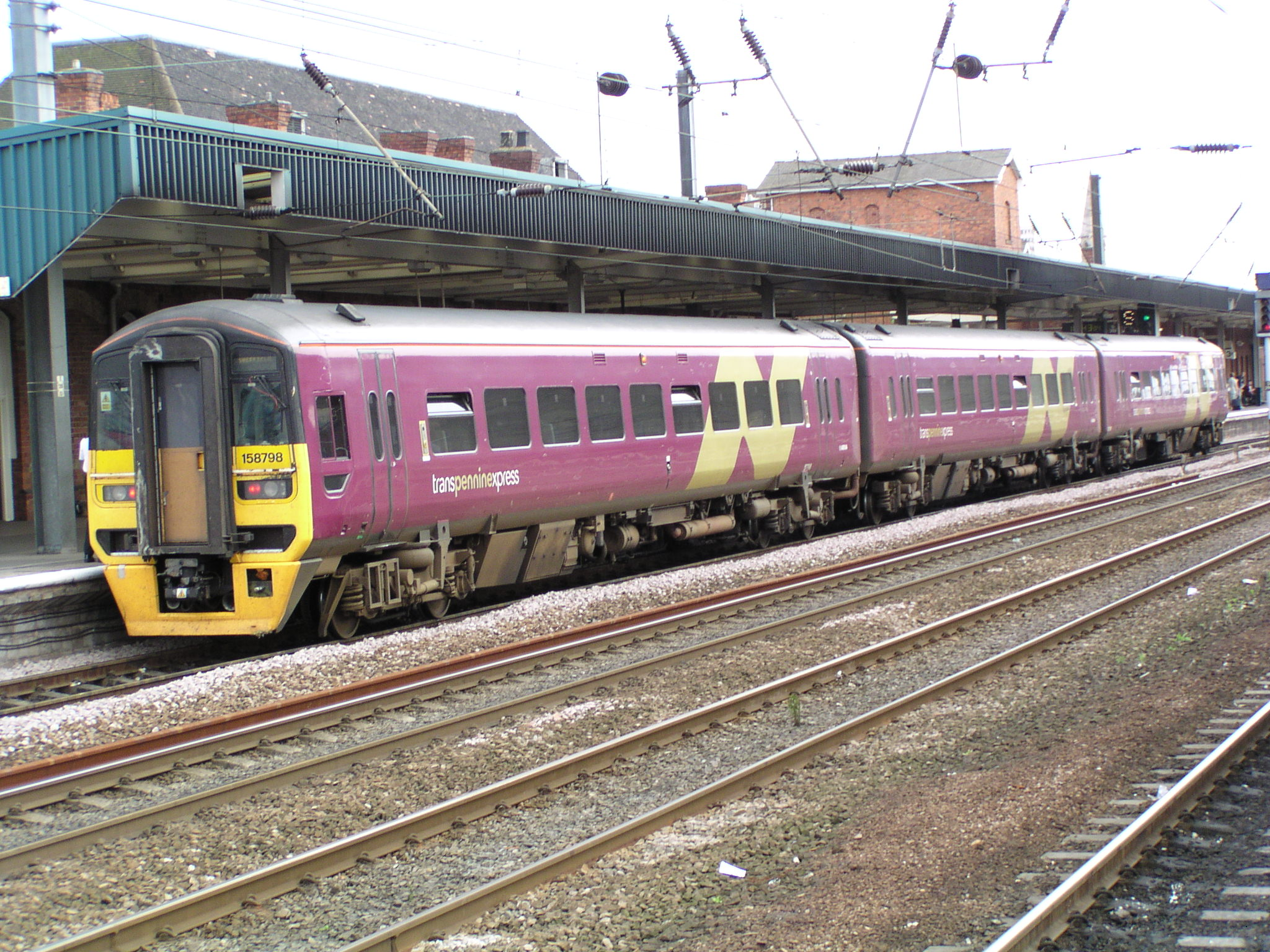
A Class 158 diesel multiple unit at Doncaster, 2003

Diesel multiple units and railcars are trains, usually with passenger accommodation, that are self-powered with diesel engines and do not require a locomotive. Railcars can be single carriages while, in multiple units, cars are marshalled together with a driving position at either end. As of December 2010, 23% of the rail passenger cars used on the National Rail network were part of a diesel multiple unit (DMU).

Some prototype steam-powered railcars appeared in the mid-19th century and over 100 were built at the start of the 20th century. Diesel motors became powerful enough for railway use after World War I; the Great Western Railway built several single cars and multiple units in the 1930s, which lasted until the 1960s. A 1952 report recommended the trialling of lightweight diesel multiple units, followed by plans in the 1955 Modernisation Plan for up to 4,600 diesel railcars. Most of these had a mechanical transmission, but the Southern Region had experience of DC electric multiple units (EMU) and diesel-electric multiple units (DEMU) were introduced.

In 1960, the Blue Pullman service was introduced as a high-speed trainset, consisting of coaches sandwiched between two power cars. This arrangement was later used for the InterCity 125, permitting a top speed of 125 miles per hour (201 km/h). Initially this train was considered to be a DEMU but, for operational reasons, the classification was changed and the power cars became identified as Class 43 diesel locomotives.

== Origins ==
=== Steam railcars ===
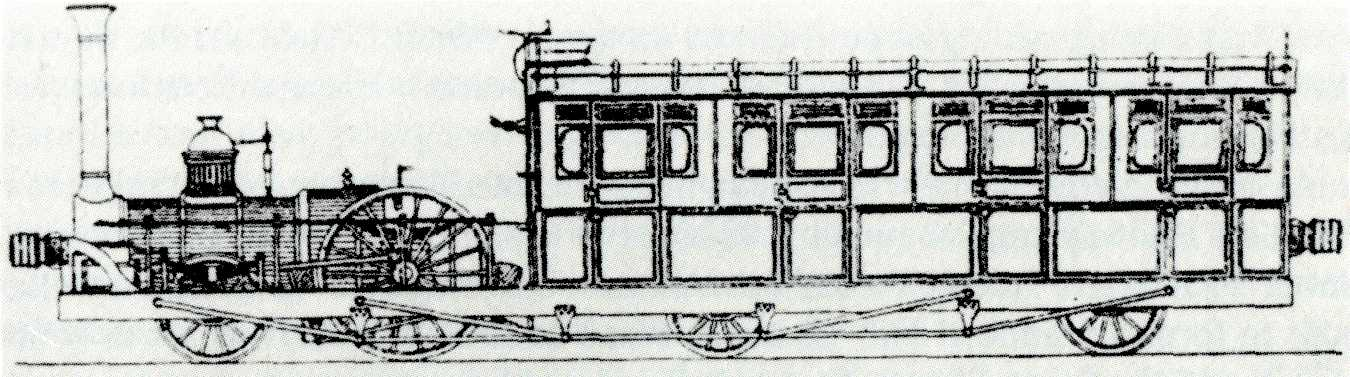
Steam railcar Enfield, built by William Adams for the Eastern Counties Railway in 1849. Note the raised buffers for use with other rolling stock.

From 1847 to 1849, William Bridges Adams built a number of steam railcars, vehicles with a steam engine for propulsion and passenger accommodation. These were the Express or Lilliputian, Fairfield and Enfield. Kitson and Company of Leeds built Ariel's Girdle in 1851. However, the next railcars were built in 1902 for the London & South Western Railway for the line from Fratton to East Southsea, although before entering passenger service it was lent to the Great Western Railway (GWR). By 1908, the GWR had purchased or built 99 railcars (or "railmotors" as it called them) but, from 1917, began converting them into autocoaches for use on push-pull trains with a steam locomotive, as these were more reliable and were able to haul additional carriages or goods wagons. Between 1905 and 1911, the Lancashire and Yorkshire Railway (L&YR) purchased or built seventeen steam rail cars, some running into the 1940s.

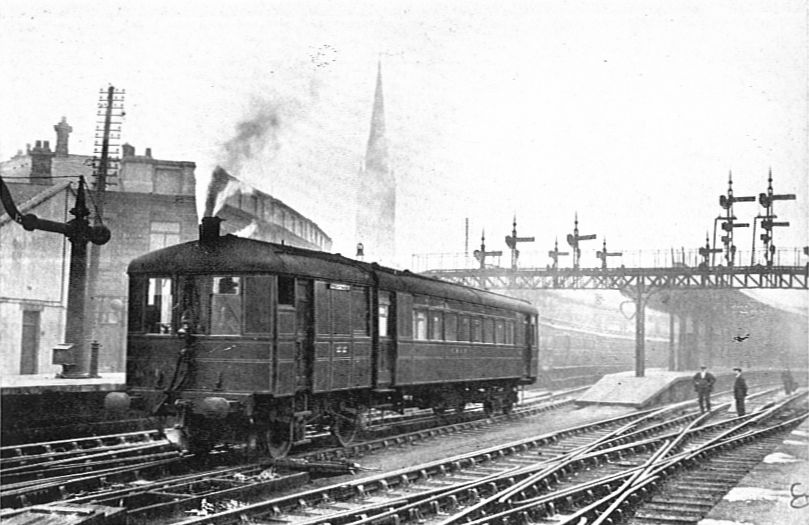
LNER Sentinel-Cammell steam railcar

After trials in 1924, the London & North Western Railway (LNWR) bought three types of steam railcars from Sentinel-Cammell and Claytons. As of 2012, a reconstructed GWR 1908 steam railmotor is operational, based at Didcot Railway Centre and an GWR autotrailer is being restored.

=== Petrol and diesel railcars ===
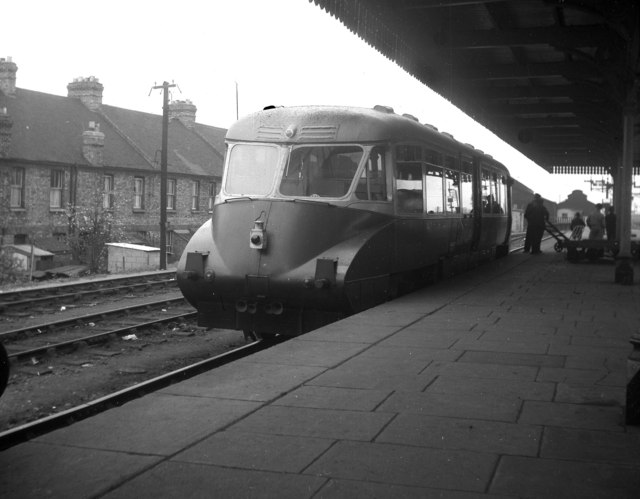
One of the earlier, more-streamlined GWR diesel railcars, still in British Railways' service in 1956

An early petrol railcar was the 1903 Petrol Electric Autocar, built by the North Eastern Railway. In 1914, the London and North Western Railway commissioned a 90 hp (67 kW) petrol-electric railcar, although this was converted into a driving trailer in 1924. After World War I, more powerful diesel engines were available and the London Midland & Scottish Railway (LMS) commissioned a four-car DEMU in 1928, using a 500 hp (370 kW) Beardmore engine; this was similar to that used on the airship R101, placed in a power car that had been used on the Lancashire and Yorkshire Railway's electrified line from Bury to Holcombe Brook. In the early 1930s, Armstrong Whitworth built three railcars for the LMS, London & North Eastern Railway (LNER) and Southern Railway. These had a 250 hp (190 kW) Sulzer engine driving two GEC traction motors and could seat 60 passengers, able to pull trailers or run in multiple. English Electric built a prototype railcar called Bluebird with a 200 hp (150 kW) engine. In 1938, the LMS-built a 3-car articulated multiple unit at Derby, with two 125 hp (93 kW) motors driving the axles using a torque converter, controlled using an electro-pneumatic system. Seating 162 including 24 in first-class, it ran in service between Oxford and Cambridge, but was withdrawn in 1940 due to World War II.

Between 1933 and 1942, GWR received 38 diesel power cars. The first streamlined car used one AEC 120 hp (89 kW) engine, seating 69 passengers. This was followed by three cars with two engines for a cross-country service between Birmingham Snow Hill and Cardiff Central, then suburban passenger cars and a parcels car. No. 18 was designed to pull horse boxes and with electro-pneumatic multiple unit control, followed by twenty more to a similar design. The last four were built with only one driving compartment so as to operate in pairs with a trailer between them. As of 2012, a GWR diesel railcar is preserved in running order at the Didcot Railway Centre, one is a static exhibit at the Museum of the Great Western Railway and one is being restored at the Kent and East Sussex Railway.

== First generation DMUs ==
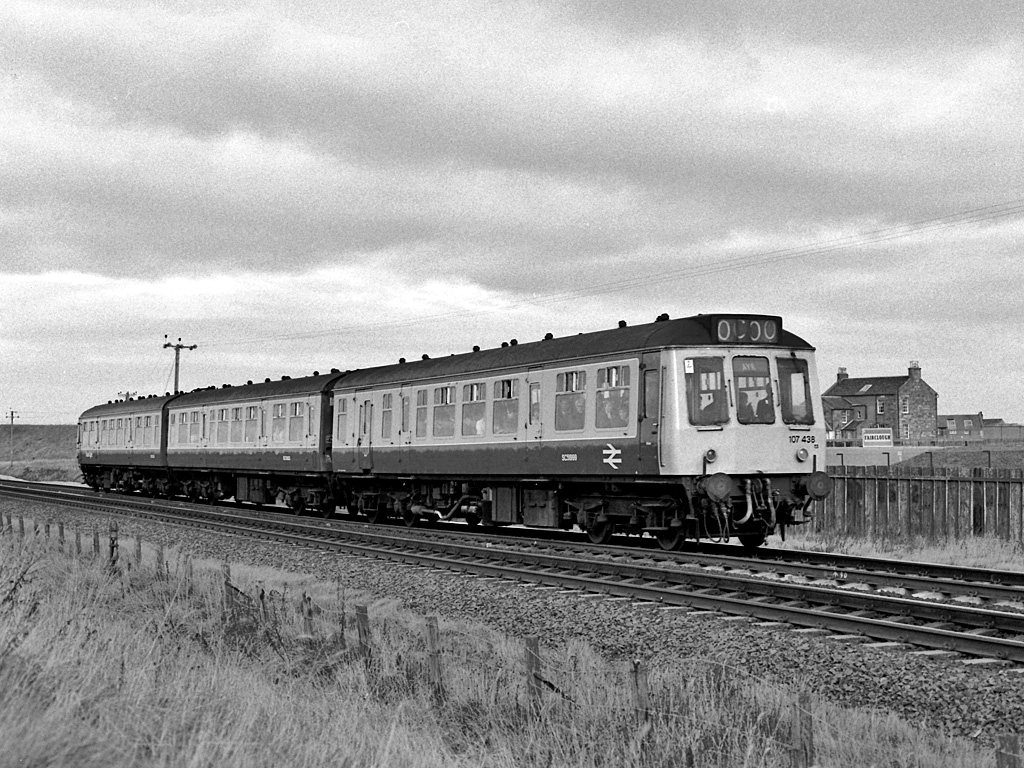
A diesel multiple unit at Gailes in 1983

The railways were placed under Government control two days before war was declared on 3 September 1939. After the war, the railways were in a poor financial state, with a maintenance backlog. Government control was relinquished when the Transport Act 1947 nationalised the railways in Great Britain and control passed to the Railway Executive of the British Transport Commission, which inherited 37 diesel railcars. A 1952 report recommended lightweight DMU trials and a memo to the Board suggested diesel railcars could replace push-pull steam trains on 168 routes. After fuel rationing ended, the first order was placed in November 1952 for 21 two-car sets built at Derby Works, which became known as Derby lightweights.

More were to follow, until this class numbered 66 motor cars and 55 trailers. In 1952, British United Traction made numerous four-wheeled single car railbuses.

As part of the 1955 Modernisation Plan of British Railways, plans were made for up to 4,600 diesel railcars. The British Railway workshops at Derby and Swindon did not have the necessary capacity, so private carriage builders such as Metropolitan-Cammell, Gloucester, Birmingham and Cravens received orders. Not all units could work in multiple with each other, but the blue square coupling code covered 84% of the cars built, using a four-speed gearbox with gear selection controlled pneumatically. Engines could vary in power output from 150 to 230 hp (110 to 170 kW) and vacuum brakes were used. Internally, the units could be classified as suburban, with doors for each seating bay and 3+2 seating in second class; these included Class 118, which were low density with two doors per vehicle side; 3+2 bus-style seating in second class, such as Class 114; and InterCity with interiors to the same standard as locomotive-hauled stock, such as Class 124.

In 1963, Richard Beeching's The Reshaping of British Railways report recommending the closure of 5,000 miles (8,000 km) of mostly rural branch railways, led to the Beeching cuts and halted the manufacture of new vehicles.

As of 2012, about 250 vehicles survive in preservation and various vehicles (mainly Classes 101 and 121/122) survived in departmental use.

== Diesel-electric multiple units ==
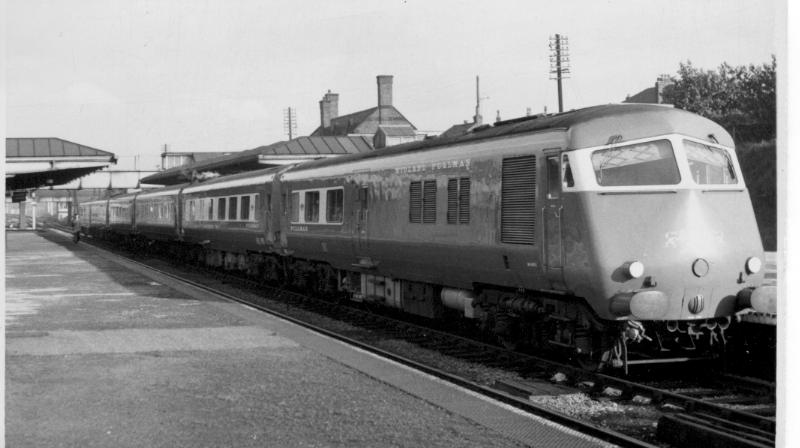
A Midland Pullman at Cheadle Heath in 1960

DEMUs were introduced on the Southern Region, where there was experience of DC EMUs. The Hastings line had special restrictions, due to tunnels on the line, and special narrow stock was needed. The six-car sets had two power cars, each having 500 horsepower (370 kW) diesel generator driving two standard Southern Region 250 horsepower (190 kW) traction motors. Introduction had been planned for June 1957, but special services were run early following a fire at London Cannon Street. When the full timetable started, 12-car trains divided en route into non-stop and stopping portions. Elsewhere, the standard loading gauge could be used and the trailer vehicles were similar to contemporary Southern Region EMUs. Two-car sets were built for local services on unelectrified lines in Hampshire, followed by three-car sets, for which the generator was uprated to 600 horsepower (450 kW).

The Blue Pullman was a class of high-speed luxury DEMUs introduced in 1960. Six-coach sets were used on the London Midland Region, all first class with at-seat service from two kitchen cars. The two power cars had diesel engines, connected to a 870 hp (650 kW) generators, both supplying four 199 hp (148 kW) traction motors. The Western Region units had two additional second class coaches. All cars were double glazed and air-conditioned, a first on British Railways.

There was a desire in British Railways for faster trains, but none of the main line diesel locomotives could achieve anything faster than 100 mph (160 km/h). It had been calculated that 4,000 hp (3,000 kW) was needed and, after the Paxman Valenta engine with an output of 2,250 hp (1,680 kW) became available, a prototype train with two Class 41 power cars and standard Mark 3 coaches was built. In 1973, this prototype achieved 143 mph (230 km/h) and production InterCity 125 trains entered service in October 1976, becoming the first 125 mph (201 km/h) diesel train service in the world. Initially the rolling stock was considered to be DEMUs, with coaches sandwiched between two power cars.

Two prototype Class 210 DEMUs were introduced in 1981, based on the Mark 3 coach bodyshell with a diesel engine mounted at the end of one of the driving cars. It was not a success, due to complexity and cost.

Diesel-electric and diesel-battery-electric Class 230s were converted from London Underground D78 Stock for Transport for Wales and West Midlands Trains.

== Second generation DMUs ==
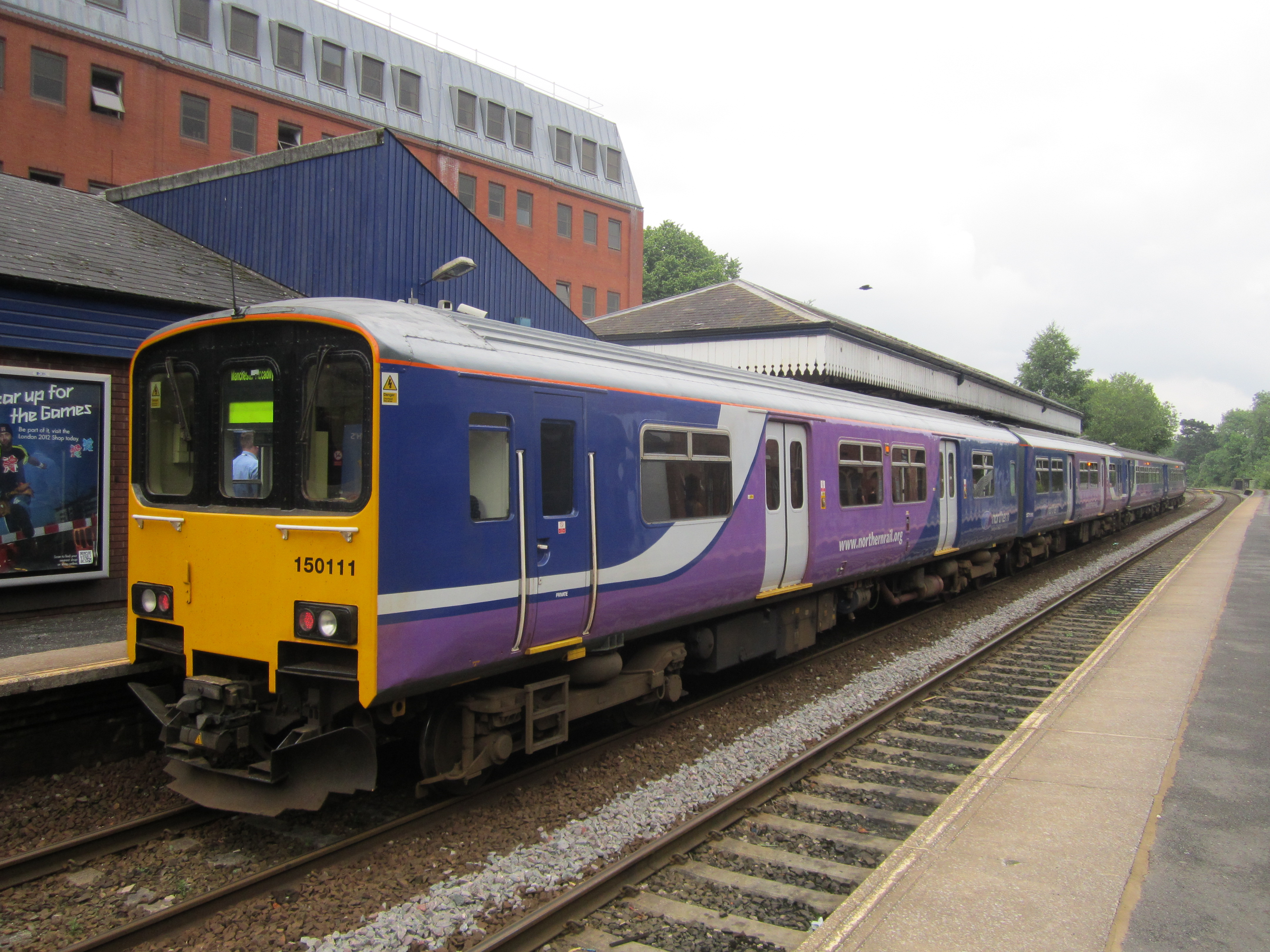
A Northern Rail Class 150 Sprinter at Knutsford

The Pacer series grew out of a single car prototype developed for export that used a body designed by Leyland Motors, with bus components mounted on a four-wheeled high-speed freight underframe. Two-car production units were introduced into Britain from 1981 to 1987.

A prototype Sprinter was built in 1983, based on the Mark 3 bodyshell design. The British Rail Engineering Limited Class 150 with a high density layout, followed by the 150/2 that had gangways between units. The Leyland Class 155 and Metro-Cammell Class 156 were built in 1987–89. Most Class 155 units were split into single-car Class 153 units in 1991–92, with a new compact cab being fitted to the inner ends by Hunslet. The Class 158 was built for long-distance routes, with air conditioning and a quiet interior. An upgraded version of the Class 158, the Class 159, was built for Network SouthEast on the West of England Main Line, between Exeter St Davids and London Waterloo.

The Networker Turbo was built for Network SouthEast in the early 1990s. The Class 165 is a two- or three-coach unit used on local services on Chiltern and Thames routes out of London; this was followed by the 90 mph (140 km/h) Class 166 for longer-distance services.

== Privatisation ==
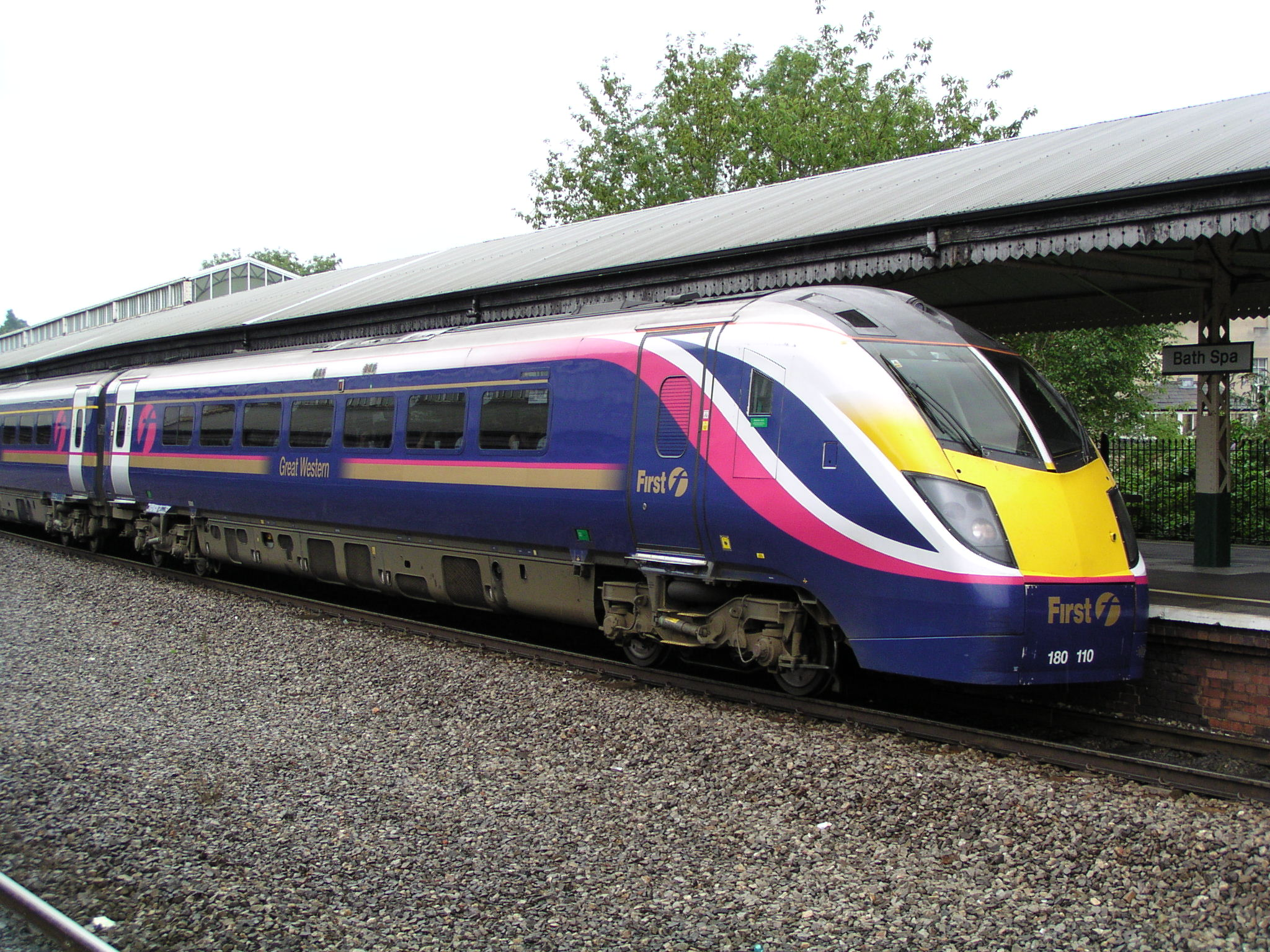
A First Great Western Class 180 at Bath Spa

Train manufacturer British Rail Engineering Limited was privatised in 1989 and, between 1994 and 1997, the rest of British Rail was privatised. Ownership of the track and infrastructure passed to Railtrack on 1 April 1994; passenger operations were later franchised to individual train operating companies and freight services were sold outright. Rolling stock is owned by ROSCOs and leased to the train operators; competitive tenders are invited from manufacturers for new trains.

During the privatisation process, there was a gap of nearly three years during which no new rolling stock orders were placed. The first new order placed was in June 1996 for four Class 168 Clubman DMUs for Chiltern Railways. These were a development of the Networker Turbo design already in use by Chiltern and other operators.

The Bombardier Turbostar was an evolution of the Class 168 and was operated by Anglia Railways, Central Trains, Chiltern Railways, Hull Trains, London Midland, London Overground Rail Operations, ScotRail, South West Trains and Southern. By September 2020, they were operated by Abellio ScotRail, CrossCountry, Govia Thameslink Railway, Northern Trains, Transport for Wales and West Midlands Trains.

Alstom Coradia units were built in between 1999 and 2001. They consists of the 100 mph (160 km/h) Class 175 (27 units), built for First North Western and currently operating for Great Western Railway and Class 180 Adelante (14 units), a 125 mph (201 km/h) high-speed unit built for First Great Western and, as at September 2020, were operated by East Midlands Railway and Grand Central.

The Siemens Desiro Class 185 is in service on TransPennine Express services. The 51-strong fleet was built between 2005 and 2006 for First TransPennine Express.

The Bombardier Voyagers are a series of high-speed DEMUs. Virgin CrossCountry were looking to replace a mixture of life-expired locomotive-hauled trains and mid-life HSTs, and have tilting for use on the West Coast Main Line. The result was the non-tilting Class 220 Voyager and tilting Class 221 Super Voyager. By September 2020, they were operated by Avanti West Coast and CrossCountry. Midland Mainline and Hull Trains ordered the Class 222 Meridian non-tilting version. As at September 2020, all are operated by East Midlands Railway.

As part of the Intercity Express Programme, bi-mode Class 800 and Class 802s entered service on the Great Western Main Line in 2017 and on the East Coast Main Line in 2019.

Class 195 CAF Civity DMUs are now operated by Northern Trains, with Class 196 by West Midlands Trains and Transport for Wales Rail.

Greater Anglia replaced its second generation DMU fleet with new bi-mode Stadler Flirts. The first Class 755 unit entered service on 29 July 2019 and 38 units are operated currently.

The bi-mode Class 769 were converted from several Class 319 for Great Western Railway, Northern Trains and Transport for Wales.

== Refuelling ==
Diesel railcars must be refuelled at depot stops. The refuelling process is usually carried out by a qualified operator with knowledge of rail refuelling. The train driver levels the train up to the platform to meet the refuelling pipes assigned at measured distances according to the length of the DMU and the refill nozzles. A rail refuelling flyte coupler is used to connect the DMU to the fuel line. It is a screw-in connection with a safety dry break mechanism to stop accidental leaks. The flow of fuel must be high volume but low pressure, to ensure the fuel does not overfill. Usually there is a float arm similar to a toilet cistern that cuts off the refuelling once a predefined level is reached but, if the pressure is too high, this can cause the tank to overfill and leak fuel.
