= British electric multiple units =

British self-powered electric trains

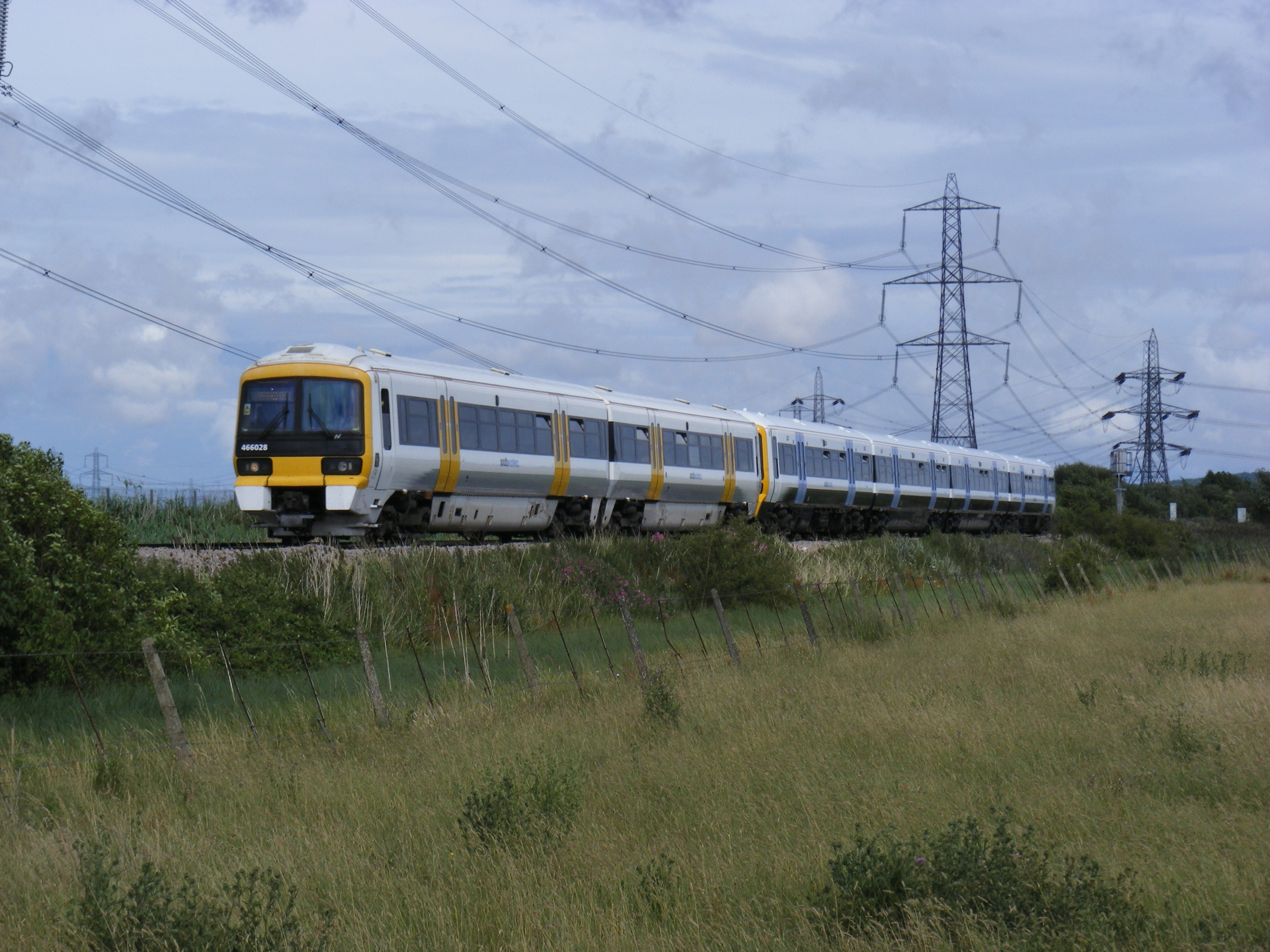
A train formed of Class 466 and 465 EMUs

An electric multiple unit (EMU) is an electric self-powered train, capable of operating in multiple with other EMUs and without the need for a locomotive; these are typically passenger trains with accommodation in every vehicle and a driving position at each end. The term can also be used to describe a train that is a permanent formation with a non-driving power car, such as the Advanced Passenger Train. (Note: A train was made from two units classified as TOPS Class 370 AC EMUs.) As of December 2010, two-thirds of the passenger carriages in Great Britain are formed in EMUs.

Electric railways began in Great Britain in 1883 and the first EMU ran on the Liverpool Overhead Railway in 1893. In the early 20th century, systems were developed where all the motors on a train could be controlled by a low voltage signal from any cab. Due to problems using steam locomotives underground, the underground railways in London and Liverpool were early adopters of 600 V DC electric traction and, by 1907, underground railways in London and some provincial cities were running electric trains. A 6.7 kV 25 Hz overhead system was also used from 1908. After the railway companies were grouped in 1923, the Southern Railway greatly expanded the third-rail DC electrification, replacing some early AC electrification. Overhead lines at 1,500 V DC were planned and installed just before and after the Second World War. The early EMU carriages, similar to contemporaneous locomotive-hauled carriages, were constructed of wood with hinged doors with accommodation in saloons or compartments. As time went on, more steel became used in carriage construction.

After the Second World War, the railways were nationalised and the 25 kV 50 Hz overhead system was installed; this eventually replaced all 1,500 V DC systems. South of London, the Southern Railway third-rail electrification system continued to expand.

== Origins ==
=== Early electric railways ===
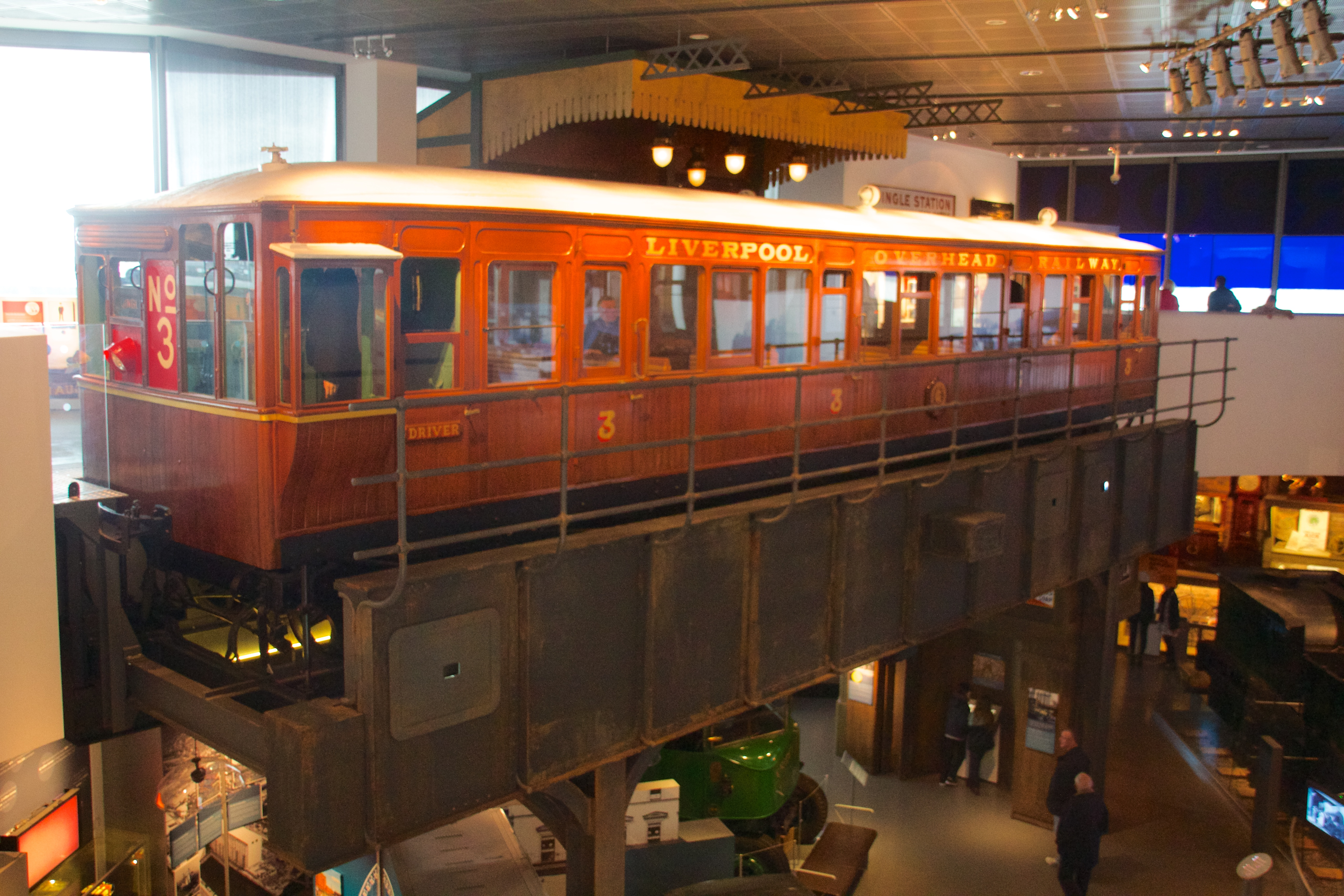
A Liverpool Overhead Railway carriage in the Museum of Liverpool, 2014

Volks Electric Railway, the first electric passenger railway in Britain, opened in 1883 as a short 2-foot (610 mm) gauge electric railway running for 1/4 mi (400 m) in Brighton. At first electrical power at 160 V DC was supplied to a small car using the two running rails, but it was not long before a third live rail was added, a sliding shoe making contact to the top.

The City and South London Railway, a 3.2-mile-long (5.1 km) deep-level tube railway, opened in 1890 with carriages hauled by electric locomotives powered from a third rail beneath the train energised at 500 V DC. In 1893 the Liverpool Overhead Railway opened with two lightweight passenger cars coupled together; on each car one bogie was powered with a single 60 hp (45 kW) motor powered from a third rail between the tracks at 500 V DC. Any number could be coupled together and all the motors controlled by the driver at the front.

In 1898, the deep-level Waterloo and City Railway opened with EMUs, a central third rail providing traction current at 500 V to 530 V DC. The current for the two motor cars could be controlled from either driving cab, but the Board of Trade became concerned about the fire risk presented by the 11 power cables carried on the roof of the train and barred installation of similar systems in deep-level tubes. Therefore, when in 1900 the Central London Railway opened its deep-level tube railway, electric locomotives hauled carriages.

In 1900, the Metropolitan Railway and the District Railway ran an experimental EMU in passenger service for six months. A four-rail system was used, two rails outside the running rails providing the traction current at 500–550 V DC. Only the traction motors in the leading motor car were used, the trailing motor coasting. In 1901, a Metropolitan and District joint electrification committee recommended a three-phase AC system with overhead wires. Initially this was accepted by both parties, but the District needed to raise finance and found an investor in 1901, the American Charles Yerkes. Yerkes soon had control of the District and his experiences in the United States led him to favour DC with a track level conductor rail pickup similar to that in use on the City & South London Railway and Central London Railway. After arbitration by the Board of Trade the DC system was taken up.

=== Low-voltage multiple control ===
In 1897, Frank J. Sprague demonstrated a system where a low-voltage control signal from any driving position controlled all the motors on a train, developed for the South Side Elevated Railroad in Chicago. This electro-magnetic system was developed in Britain by British Thomson-Houston (BTH) and first used in Europe in 1902 on the Central London Railway when it changed over to EMU operation to solve a design problem with its locomotives. Westinghouse Electrical developed an electro-pneumatic multiple unit system that used a lower control current and when in 1903 the District opened its line from Acton Town to South Harrow with experimental EMUs these used control systems from BTH and Westinghouse. After these trials the District selected BTH equipment for its B Stock.

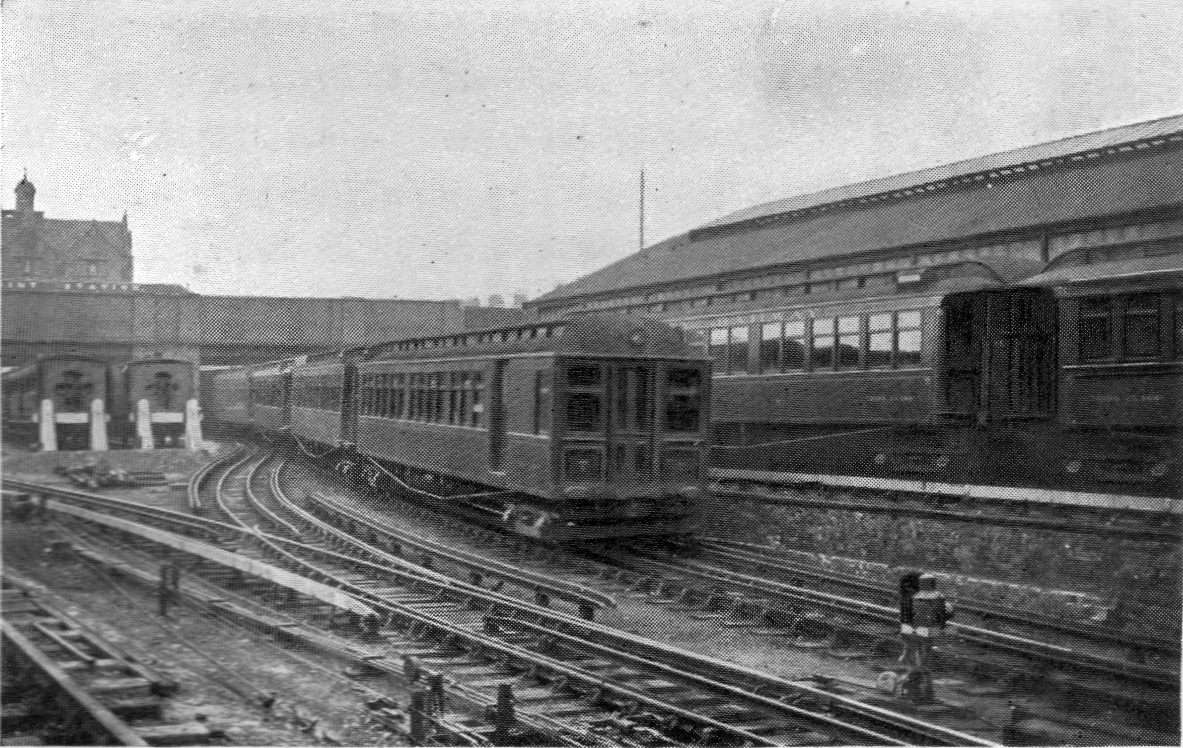
An early electric multiple unit on the Mersey Railway

The underground Mersey Railway started an electric service on 3 May 1903, electrified by British Westinghouse Electric with equipment from the US. A four-rail DC system was installed, with a positive outer rail and a negative return rail between the running rails.

In London, the Great Northern & City Railway was a 3 1/2 miles (5.6 km) underground line from Moorgate to Finsbury Park. EMUs with BTH electrical equipment were used from the opening on 14 February 1904; these picked up traction current from conductor rails both sides of the running rails.

When the Lancashire and Yorkshire Railway (L&YR) was considering electrification of its Liverpool suburban railways, concerns were being expressed, especially in the railway press, that engineering developments in Britain were being overtaken by electrification projects in America and Switzerland. The Preston-based Dick, Kerr & Co. was made responsible for the traction systems and the L&YR built the rolling stock. A 625 V DC four-rail system was adopted, the live rail outside the running rails with a return rail, cross-bonded to the running rails, between them. The two driving motor cars each powered by four 150 hp (110 kW) motors directly controlled from a driving cab at either end of the train. Electric services started between Liverpool Exchange and Southport on 22 March 1904.

The North Eastern Railway (NER) began using EMUs between New Bridge Street and Benton on 29 March 1904 and from 25 July 1904 over a circular route between Newcastle Central and Tynemouth, electrified with a third rail at 600 V DC (see Tyneside Electrics). The EMUs, with BTH electrical equipment, were built at the NER Carriage Works at York with clerestory roofs.

The Metropolitan Railway began its electric services from Uxbridge to Baker Street in 1905 with EMUs using Westinghouse electric equipment; these ran off-peak as three-car units with a motor car and a driving trailer. Twenty trains with BTH equipment were ordered for the Hammersmith & City line, jointly operated by the Great Western Railway and the Met. From June 1905 to the end of 1905 EMUs replaced steam on all District services. In 1906-07 three deep-level tube railways opened: the Charing Cross, Euston and Hampstead Railway, Great Northern, Piccadilly and Brompton Railway and Baker Street and Waterloo Railway, all subsidiary companies of the Underground Electric Railways Company of London. The trains were built by different manufacturers to a similar design. Accommodation in open saloons was accessed by end platforms protected by lattice gates and power was collected from a 550-600 V DC four-rail system and controlled with BTH equipment.

=== Early overhead AC electrification ===
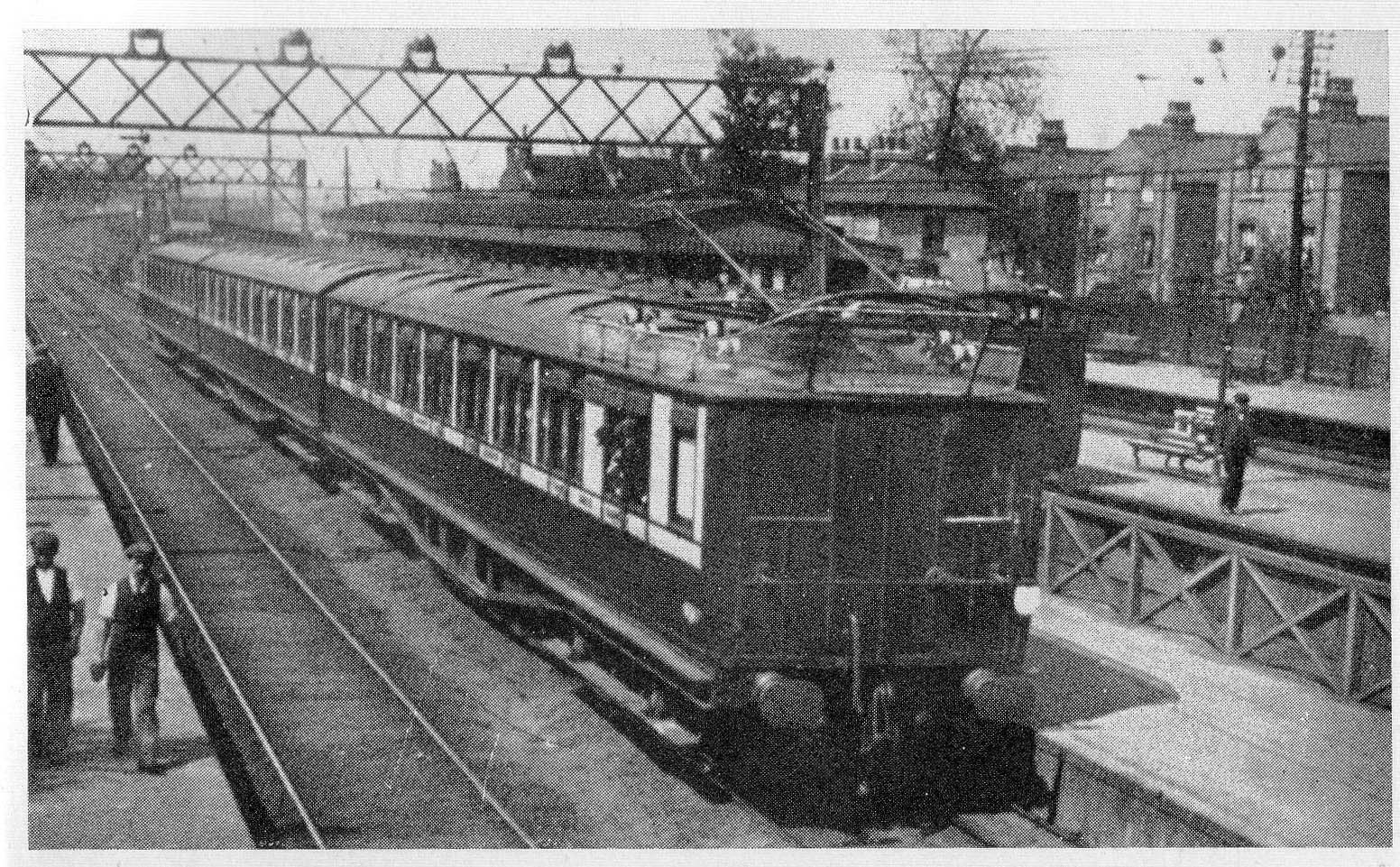
LB&SCR train at Wandsworth Road, circa 1909

In 1908, the Midland Railway introduced EMUs that used overhead line energised at 6.7 kV 25 Hz AC, on its Heysham–Morecambe–Lancaster line. From 1909, the London, Brighton and South Coast Railway (LB&SCR) also used overhead line at 6.7 kV 25 Hz. The first section to be electrified was the South London Line connecting London Bridge with Victoria via Denmark Hill, opened on 1 December 1909. The service was marketed as 'The Elevated Electric' and was an immediate success. By 1921 most of the inner London suburban lines were electrified and services to Coulsdon and Sutton opened on 1 April 1925.

The LB&SCR built three types of stock – the initial South London (SL) stock – was introduced as three-car trains, but after 1910 the first class trailers were removed and subsequently ran in two, four or six-car formations. In 1910 the CP stock was built for the Crystal Palace route; these normally ran as three-car units. The later five-car CW stock had motors fitted in driving motor luggage vans, passenger accommodation being in trailer cars.

From 1913 to 1916, the L&YR operated an experimental electric service in the Manchester area between Bury and Holcombe Brook. The equipment was provided by Dick, Kerr & Co., which was developing its products for overseas sales. The system used was 3.5 kV DC overhead and two two-car units were built. After these trials, the L&YR electrified the Manchester to Bury line using 1200 V DC with four rails. (Note: Like the Liverpool electrification, the fourth rail was bonded to the running rails and later removed.) This opened in 1916 and in 1918 the branch to Holcombe Brook was converted to the same system.

In 1907, the London & North Western Railway (L&NWR) obtained permission for a pair of extra tracks for suburban services beside its main line from Euston to Watford. Connection with the Bakerloo line at Queen's Park was planned with through running of Bakerloo line trains, so the new tracks were electrified using the 630 V DC four-rail system used on the Bakerloo. Delayed by the World War I, the first electric service ran in 1914 from Earl's Court to Willesden Junction, using borrowed District Railway trains. The L&NWR began running electric services from Broad Street to Watford in 1917 and from Euston in 1922. The first trains used electrical equipment from Siemens in Germany, but the following ones used Swiss Oerlikon equipment. The EMUs were three cars, formed from a driving motor car, trailer and a driving trailer.

From 1915, the London and South Western Railway introduced EMUs on suburban routes using a 660 V DC third-rail system. Using converted steam-hauled carriages, three-car units ran with a trailer between two driving motor cars with Westinghouse electrical equipment. After 1920, two-car trailer sets were used between these units to lengthen peak services to eight cars.

In 1921, new trains were introduced on the Underground's Piccadilly line with air-operated sliding doors. Between 1923 and 1934, Standard stock with air-operated doors replaced gate stock on London's deep-level tube railways, improving access to the cars so reducing boarding times.

== Grouping ==
In 1923, the main line railways in Britain were grouped into four companies. South of London the Southern Railway took over 24 1/2 route miles (39.4 km) of railway electrified with overhead line at 6.7 kV, 57 route miles (92 km) with a third rail at 660 V DC, and the 1 1/2-mile (2.4 km) long underground Waterloo & City Railway. The route mileage of third rail electrification was to more than double in 1925, with routes to Guildford, Dorking and Effingham Junction and from Victoria and Holborn Viaduct to Orpington via Herne Hill and the Catford Loop. In 1926 EMUs started to run on the South Eastern Main Line route to Orpington and the three lines to Dartford using the third rail system.

In 1926, the Southern announced that the DC system was to replace the LB&SCR AC system, the last AC train running on 29 September 1929. Including the London Bridge to East Croydon route which was electrified in 1928, by the end of 1929 the Southern operated over 277 1/2 route miles (446.6 km) of third rail electrified track and in that year ran 17.8 million electric train miles.

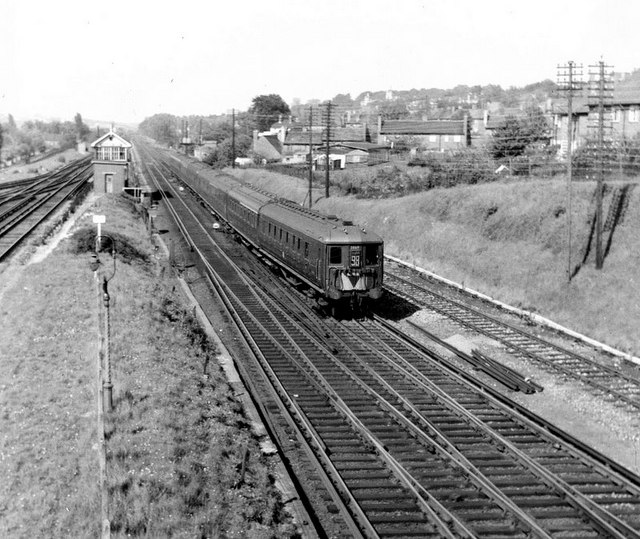
A Southern Railway 4-LAV unit in about 1968

For its suburban railways, the Southern continued the L&SWR practice of running a three-car EMU off-peak and an unpowered two-car trailer between two three-car units during peak hours. Most of the EMUs were re-built by the Southern from locomotive-hauled stock, mounted on new underframes and fitted with Westinghouse electrical equipment. In the 1930s, electrification was extended to main lines, from Brighton to London Victoria and London Bridge on 1 January 1933. For semi-fast services the 4Lav was designed; one composite coach had two toilets, one for first class and another for second class. For fast services six-car units were developed with a Pullman car or pantry in the set; three units had three first class trailers as well as the Pullman car for peak London Bridge services. The Brighton Belle was an all-Pullman EMU, providing 'at seat' meal service during the journey between London and Brighton.

In 1937, electric services began on the direct route to Portsmouth from Waterloo; the 4-COR was developed for this route. As well as gangways within units, there were connections between units. These ran with the similar 4-RES units that had a restaurant car. On suburban services, the lack of a driving position in the unpowered trailer was proving inflexible and in the early 1940s a four-car unit was built. Classified 4-SUB, the three-car units were gradually re-built into four-car units by adding a trailer, and new four-car units were built from 1944 onwards.

In 1927, a Railway Electrification Committee chaired by Sir John Pringle looked at railway electrification and recommended either 750 V DC third rail or 1,500 V DC overhead line. The Standardisation of Electrification Order 1932 set these systems, allowing 3,000 V DC overhead line in exceptional conditions. Work was started by the LNER electrifying the Liverpool Street to Shenfield and Wath to Manchester London Road, via Sheffield Victoria, routes at 1,500 V DC overhead line, but World War II suspended work. On 11 May 1931, the LMS and LNER jointly opened the Manchester, South Junction and Altrincham Railway with a 1,500 V DC overhead system, with Altrincham Electrics EMUs, three-car all-compartment trains with carriages similar to suburban LMS stock.

In London, the formation of the London Passenger Transport Board in 1933 was followed by the 1935–1940 New Works Programme. For sub-surface lines, this involved an investment in rolling stock. For the new Metropolitan line the T Stock standardised the newer compartment stock Metropolitan EMUs; older wooden-bodied stock, with hand-operated sliding doors, was replaced by new O Stock and P Stock. These had air-operated sliding doors and used a new Metadyne control system and electric braking. In 1938, Q Stock was built by replacing the District line EMU wooden trailers with new steel ones and equipping the trains with air-operated sliding doors and electro-pneumatic brakes. Also in 1938, the tube standard stock was replaced by 1,121 new cars of 1938 Stock with the control equipment under the car floor, thus giving 14% more capacity.

Outside London and the South East, the cable system that had been used on the Glasgow Subway since 1896, was changed to an electric system in 1935, with a third rail at 600 V DC. In 1938, the Wirral Railway was electrified with a third rail DC system to allow through running on the independent Mersey Railway, and Class 503 EMUs were introduced with air-operated sliding doors. Similar Class 502 EMUs replaced older stock on the Liverpool to Southport route from 1940 to 1943. In 1938, the Tyneside Electrics third rail DC system was extended to South Shields and LNER Tyneside electric units were bought to allow for service expansion.

== Nationalisation ==
=== Post-war reconstruction ===
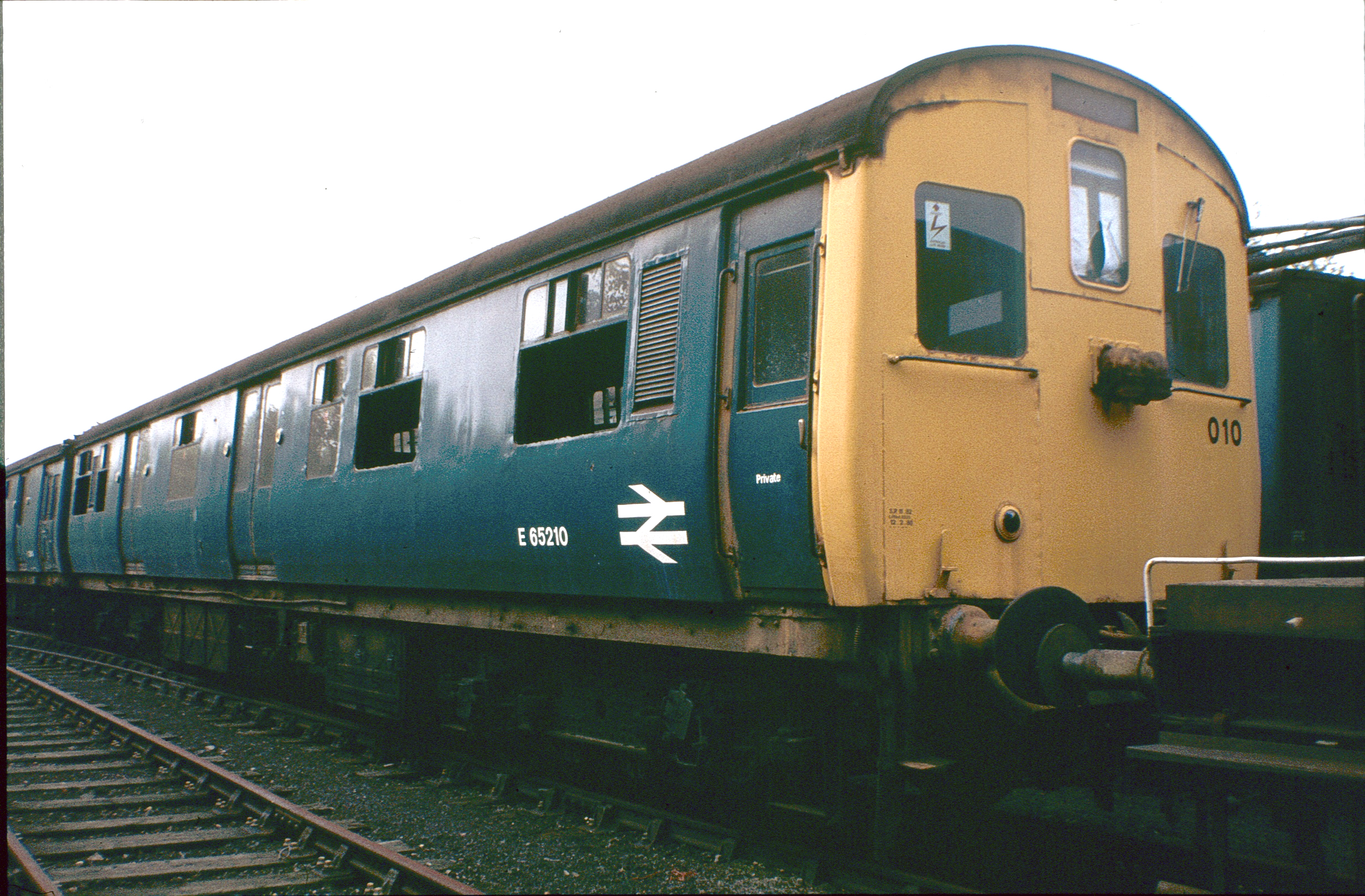
Class 306s were introduced on the London to Shenfield line in 1949; this unit was photographed at the end of its life

The railways were placed under government control two days before war was declared on 3 September 1939. After the war, the railways were in a poor financial state with a backlog of maintenance. Government control was not relinquished before the Transport Act 1947 nationalised most railways and control passed to the Railway Executive of the British Transport Commission. Some pre-war capital investment schemes that had stopped upon the outbreak of hostilities were restarted, such as 1,500 V DC electrification of the Manchester–Sheffield–Wath route and the Great Eastern suburban railways. The London to Shenfield route opened in 1949 with Class 306 Class 306 three-car EMUs with air-operated doors that collected traction current with a single diamond-shaped pantograph. Similar EMUs entered service on the Manchester end of the Manchester–Sheffield–Wath route in 1954. In 1954, Class 307 compartment stock with slam doors was introduced on the London to Southend Victoria route.

In 1948, a further report into electrification was commissioned, and this repeated the recommendations of the 1932 report for third rail at 750 V DC in Southern England and overhead line at 1,500 V DC elsewhere. However, an experiment was authorised in AC overhead line at 6.6 kV 50 Hz on the Lancaster–Morecambe–Heysham line. By 1954, similar experiments had been carried out in France on the Aix-les-Bains line at 25 kV 50 Hz, and both were considered a success. The report concluded that future electrification should be done with overhead line at 25 kV 50 Hz, except for the Southern Region as there was extensive third rail electrification already in place. The Manchester and Crewe line was to be the first to be electrified at 25 kV 50 Hz. Existing overhead line at 1,500 V DC was to be converted to 6.6 kV 50 Hz.

When electrification was installed, the lower voltage was 6.25 kV. Class 304 EMUs were introduced on the Crewe to Manchester route; similar Class 305 EMUs were built for the Great Eastern main line. The Class 504 1,200 V DC units, replacing the older units on the Manchester–Bury line, looked similar. The 1,500 V DC units operating out of Liverpool Street were converted to AC operation in 1959–1960. In 1961, Class 308 was introduced on the London–Tilbury line and, in the following year, the Class 309 became the first 100 mph (160 km/h) EMU on BR, introduced on the route to Clacton.

After World War II, to replace hand-operated sliding doors on the London Underground, unpainted aluminium R Stock reused the newer Q Stock trailers purchased before the war. New pneumatic camshaft mechanism (PCM) control equipment and motors were fitted and the sets formed with new trailers. When the Metadyne equipment on the O and P Stock became unreliable and needed replacement in the 1950s, PCM control equipment was used and the modified motor car became known as CO and CP stock respectively; trailers were classified COP Stock. For the deep-level tubes the unpainted aluminium 1959 stock was developed to replace pre-war designs, and entered service on the Piccadilly line and later on the Central.

In the Southern Region, the first 4-EPB was built at Eastleigh works in 1950, with electro-pneumatic brakes and automatic buckeye couplers. (Note: Only the mechanical coupling was automatic; the brakes and control systems still had to be manually connected.) Accommodation was in saloons and compartments with slam doors at every seat position. Bulleid-bodied production switched to the standard BR Mark 1 body in 1954, when two-car units were built to lengthen trains to ten cars on Kent suburban routes. In 1957, the three-car Class 501, similar to the 4-EPB, was introduced on the LMS lines in north London, replacing the LNWR units.

=== 1955 Modernisation Plan ===
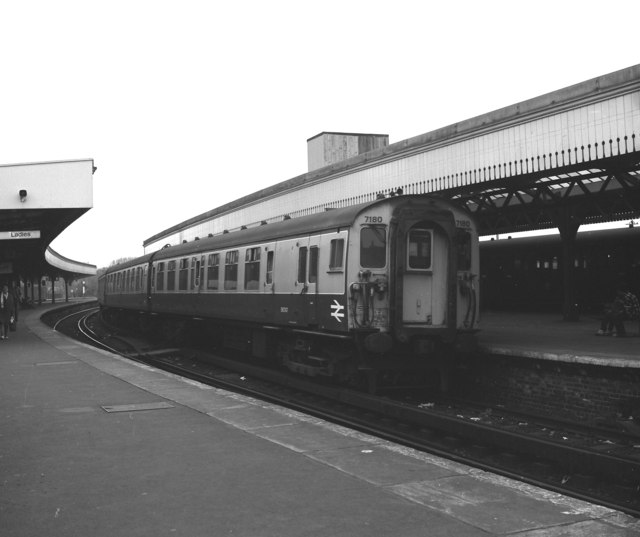
An unrefurbished Class 411 at Margate in 1980

Included in the 1955 Modernisation Plan was the electrification of the SR Kent coast lines. The Tonbridge to Hastings line was excluded because of the restricted loading gauge; the Ashford to Ore line was included in the plan but not electrified. The lines were electrified at 750 V DC and Class 411 stock was built; some units contained a buffet car. These four-car units were similar to the 4Cor units, but using the standard Mark 1 coach design with EPB brakes and an electro-pneumatic camshaft traction control system. The two motor cars each had a pair of 250 hp (190 kW) motors. There were gangways within and between units. Class 414 – two-car compartment stock with a lavatory for second class in one of the cars and another for first class – was built for stopping services. For boat trains MLV motor luggage vans were built with two 250 hp motors, designed to work in multiple with Class 411. Powered from their batteries, they were able to work short distances on non-electrified sections.

In the mid-1960s, to replace the ageing Southern Railway mainline units, four-car Class 421 and Class 423 EMUs were built. These had similar traction equipment and bodies and could work in multiple with Class 414 and Class 411 units, although there was one motor car with four motors. Class 423s were semi-fast stock, with high density 3+2 seating and a door to each seating bay; Class 421s were the express units with doors at the ends and middle. Some express units had buffet cars.

In 1967, the Southern Region wished to replace steam trains to Weymouth with through carriages but could not justify electrification beyond Bournemouth. Class 432 4REP was a high-power unit: between London and Bournemouth it was attached to one or two Class 438 4TC trailer units with driving cabs. At Bournemouth the 4REP was detached and a British Rail Class 33 locomotive adapted for push-pull working was attached at the front. This hauled the trailer units to Weymouth and pushed them back. The line from Bournemouth to Weymouth was eventually electrified in 1988.

In 1965, the railway on the Isle of Wight needed replacement rolling stock, but it had a restricted loading gauge. At the time, London Transport had some surplus standard tube stock and British Railways bought 55 cars. At first it was intended to fit bus engines, but the line was electrified with the third-rail DC system and the cars overhauled and formed into three- and four-car units. These ran from 1967 until replaced in 1989–1990 with 1938 tube stock, formed into two-car units.

A small number of EMUs were designed around the Mark 2 coach. In 1966 the Class 310 AM10 began operating on commuter services from London Euston and in the West Midlands. The Class 312s were similar units introduced in the mid-1970s.

In the early 1960s, the extension of electrification of the Metropolitan line to Amersham saw the introduction of four-car A Stock sub-surface stock. They had PCM control equipment; trains were normally eight cars, formed of two units. These replaced F and T Stock and locomotive-hauled stock. In the early 1970s, six-car C Stock was introduced on the Hammersmith & City and Circle lines, and, in the late 1970s and early 1980s, six-car D Stock and another batch of C Stock replaced Q, CO and CP stock. The deep-level Victoria line was built and with 1967 Stock introduced automatic operation in 1968. The Jubilee line opened in 1979 with 1972 tube stock. One person operation (OPO) was introduced over the London Underground after agreement was reached with the unions with the Hammersmith & City line in 1984: on the Central and Northern lines this required new trains, delivered in the 1990s.

In the late 1960s, British Railways adopted the Total Operations Processing System (TOPS) to manage its rolling stock. EMUs were given six-digit unit numbers, the first three digits representing the class and the last three being a unique identifier. AC EMU class numbers begin with a '3', Southern Region third rail DC EMUs with a '4' and other DC EMUs with a '5'.

In the late 1960s, the need for a new EMU design was recognised. Prototypes of the British Rail New Generation, 1972 or PEP design were built and placed in passenger service in 1971. Built from aluminium, with all vehicles powered and employing rheostatic braking, the production units were built by BREL York Works with two sets of air-operated doors on the sides of the car and fully automatic tightlock couplers. The first units were the dual voltage Class 313 built between February 1976 and April 1977 for the routes out of Moorgate via Finsbury Park. Class 507 DC units were built in two batches from 1978 to 1980 and the similar Class 508 units in 1979–1980. Some of these were transferred to Merseyrail after use on the Southern Region. AC units also followed: Class 314 in 1979 and Class 315 from 1980 to 1981. In the mid-1990s, new trains, which featured regenerative braking and allowed the withdrawal of guards, were introduced on London Underground's Northern and Jubilee lines.

=== Mark 3 coach design ===
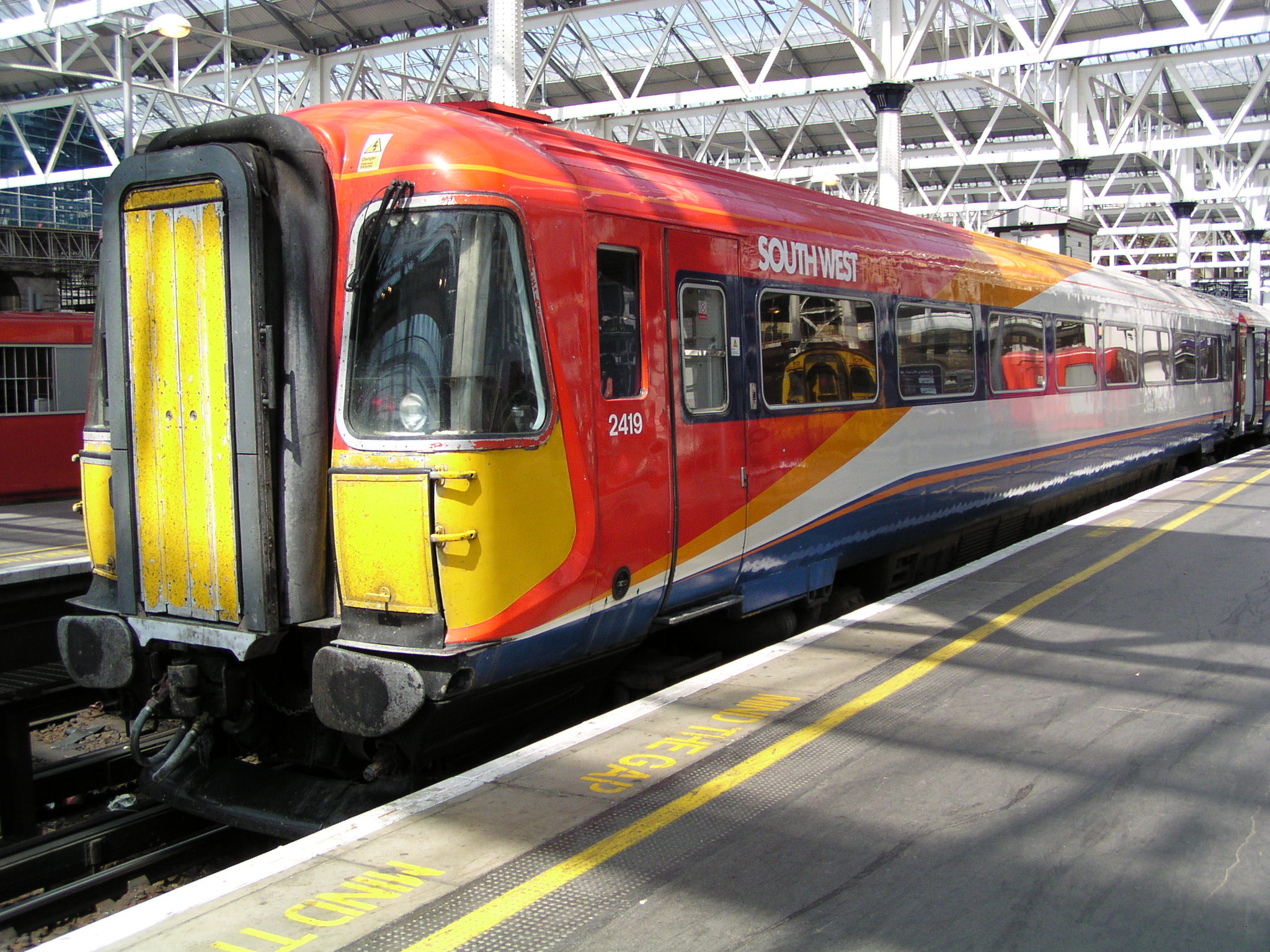
A 1980s Class 442 third-rail EMU based on the BR Mark 3 coach design

Other units were based on the all-steel Mark 3 coach design. Most are 20 m-long (66 ft), with two pairs of air-operated doors on each side of the coaches, built at BREL York. The first to be introduced were the AC Class 317, built in two batches from 1981 to 1982 and 1985 to 1987 with thyristor control systems. The DC Class 455 for inner-suburban duties in South London were built in the early and mid-1980s with recovered traction motors and equipment. The Class 318 were built by BREL for Scotland in 1985–1986. The Thameslink route across London needed dual-voltage units that could change from AC to DC at Farringdon. Class 319 was built in two batches in 1987–1988 and 1990 with gate turn-off thyristor control systems. Class 442 5Wes was built in 1988 for the DC South West Main Line from London Waterloo to Southampton, Bournemouth, Poole and Weymouth. These 23 m-long (75 ft) five-car units have air-operated plug doors at the vehicle ends and air-conditioning. Twenty-four were built in 1988-89 by BREL at its Derby Litchurch Lane Works, using traction equipment from the 4Reps they replaced. The AC Class 321 was built in three batches in 1988–1991 by BREL, with Class 322 and the three-car Class 320. The two-car DC Class 456 was built by BREL at York Works from 1990 to 1991 to work with the Class 455s.

In 1979, testing started on the West Coast Main Line of the Advanced Passenger Train (APT), formed of two Class 370 units composed of a driving trailer, five trailers and a power car. To increase speed the car bodies tilted, but problems meant the trains were withdrawn. The tilt technology was used twenty years later in Class 390 Pendolinos on the same route.

In the 1980s, prototype tube train designs were trialled in order to generate feedback about future developments. These led to the 1992 tube stock that replaced the ageing 1959/62 stock on the Central line. The extension of the Jubilee line saw the introduction of the externally similar 1996 tube stock; refurbishment of the 1983 stock was being considered, but building new trains cost about the same.

In 1980, the Tyne and Wear Metro opened over the Tyneside Electrics route, diverted through tunnels on parts of the line. New trains were introduced based on German Stadtbahnwagen B light rail units and power was taken from an overhead line at 1500 V DC. In London, the automatic Docklands Light Railway opened in 1987; trains are staffed by a train captain who can drive the train in abnormal situations.

In the 1980s and 1990s, Network SouthEast developed Networker trains with micro-processor controlled three-phase AC traction motors on half the axles. The build of the first Class 465 units was split between the newly privatised British Rail Engineering Limited and GEC-Alstholm.

Eurostar trains were ordered in 1989 to run from London to Paris and Brussels through the Channel Tunnel, then being built. They were designed to run over the DC electrified southern British network, through the AC electrified Channel Tunnel, on the French high-speed railway network (LGV Nord) at 300 km/h (186 mph) and Belgium railways. Similar to the French TGV but built the British loading gauge, the trains are 20 coaches long with two power cars, and the bogie on the passenger cars next to the power cars motored. The trains entered service in 1994.

== Privatisation ==
Train manufacturer BREL was privatised in 1989, and between 1994 and 1997 the rest of British Rail was privatised. Ownership of the track and infrastructure passed to Railtrack on 1 April 1994; afterwards passenger operations were franchised to individual private-sector operators and the freight services sold outright. Rolling stock is owned by rolling stock companies (ROSCO) and leased to the train operators; competitive tenders are invited from manufacturers for new trains. To ensure flexibility with leasing arrangements electric multiple units are specified to be able to be modified to run on both the 25 kV AC and 750 V DC systems. Most DC units do not have the transformers and pantographs fitted, but some (such as the Class 377) have sub-classes that operate on routes requiring a switch between AC and DC operation en route.

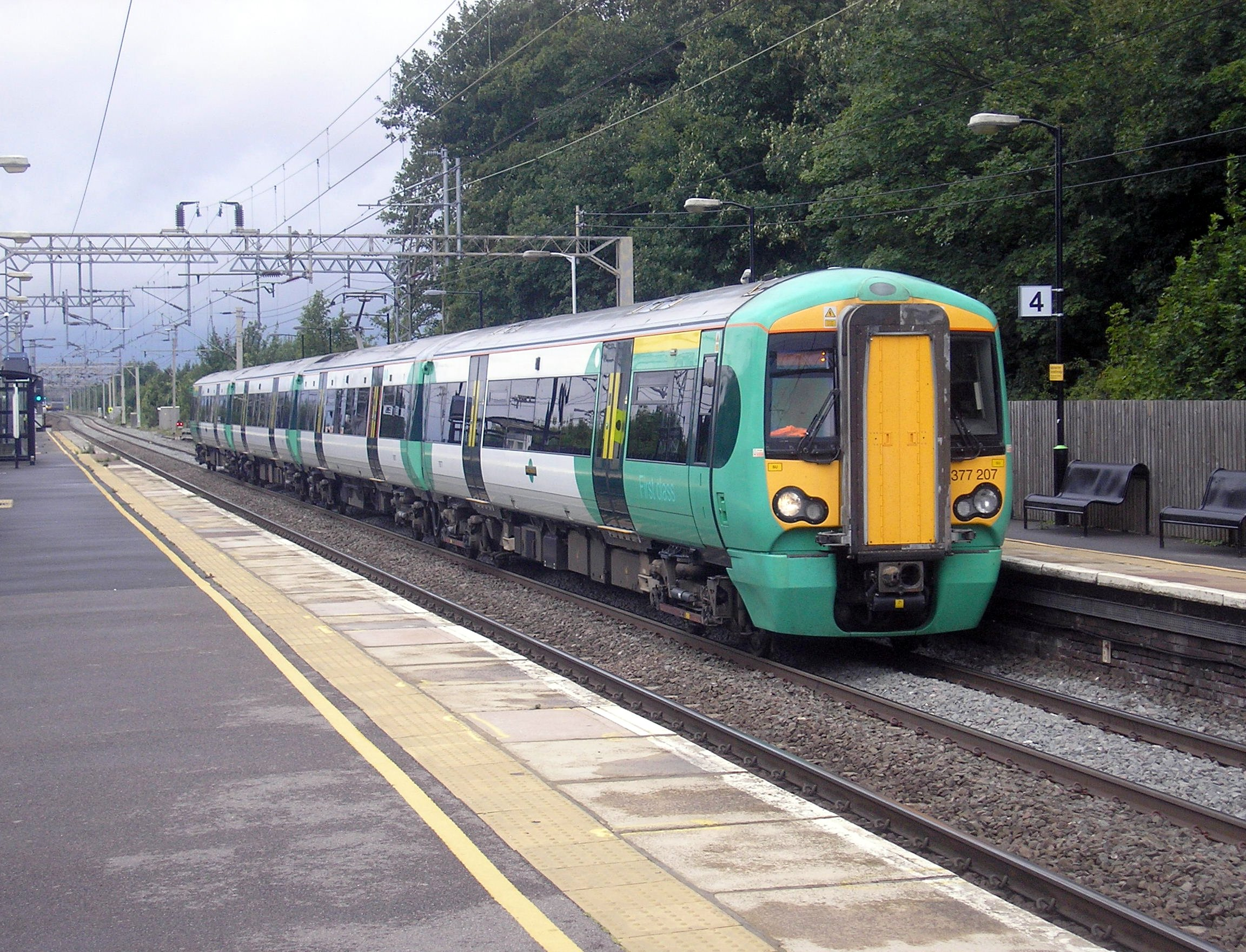
Southern Class 377/2 377207 at Hemel Hempstead with a train from Milton Keynes Central to South Croydon

The first Bombardier Electrostar units were the AC Class 357, built in 1999–2002 for c2c and these were followed by the DC Class 375 built in 1999-05 for Connex South Eastern and Connex South Central. In 1999 the UK Health and Safety Executive issued safety regulation requiring the withdrawal all rolling stock without override protection by 1 January 2003 and with slam doors by 1 January 2005. Mark 1 coaches and multiple units based on the design did not comply with either requirement and needed replacement or modification. However, Connex lost both franchises, and when Govia took over the South Central franchise as Southern they modified their specification and their units became Class 377, although the only major difference today is the Southern units have a camera on the side of every car linked to screens in the driver's cab. Introduction was protracted on both routes with problems such as cab and control equipment so the HSE extended the use of Mark 1 based rolling stock until 31 December 2004 with the proviso: "... that any Mark 1 rolling stock operated by the TOCs after 31 March 2003 must form part of a train fully fitted with a train protection system." It was 2005 before all units and entered service. To increase Southeastern suburban stock the DC Class 376 was delivered in 2004–2005. Dual-voltage Class 378 units were delivered for London Overground from 2007; the AC Class 379 for National Express East Anglia and some more 5-car Class 377s are on order for Southern.

To improve services and replace some of the older trains in 1998 South West Trains ordered 30 four-car Juniper Class 458 DC units; in 1999 similar Class 334 three-car AC units started run in Scotland. The DC units were assembled with eight-car Class 460 units ordered to replace Gatwick Express push-pull trains. The Juniper units had a protracted entry into service; the Class 458 units had poor reliability so it was 2004 before all units were in service, and plans were made in 2005 to withdraw the units from service, although reliability has since improved. As of August 2012 for operational reasons the Class 460 units have been withdrawn and it planned the coaches will be used to extend the Class 458 to five-car units.

Siemens Transportation systems and CAF supplied Class 332 for Heathrow Express in 1998 and the similar Class 333 for Northern Spirt in 2000

When South West Trains needed to replace its Mark 1 stock in 2001, after the problems with the Juniper Class 458 units, the units chosen were the Desiro UK range. The 23 m-long (75 ft) Class 444 was introduced to Portsmouth and Bournemouth and Class 450 for the outer suburban services. AC versions have entered service: Class 350 for stopping services on the West Coast Main Line and Class 360 for outer suburban Liverpool Street services. Similar Class 380 three and four-car AC units were built for the Strathclyde area in 2009–2010.

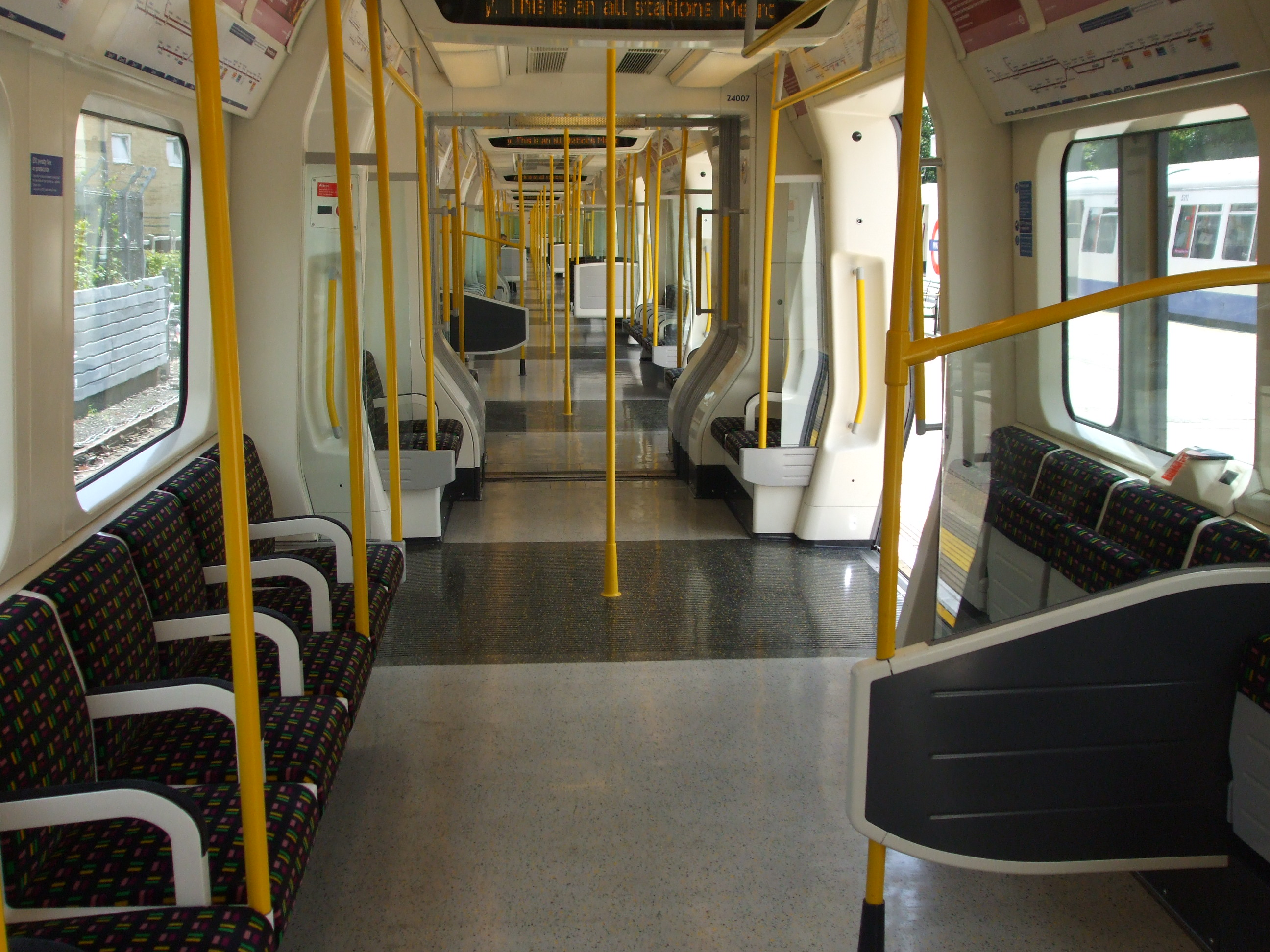
The interior of a London Underground S Stock train, featuring gangways between the individual carriages

From 2000 to 2005 Virgin Trains modernised the West Coast Main Line with Alstom's Class 390 125 mph (201 km/h) capable nine-car units. These use the tilt technology developed 20 years previously by the APT project. These units were designed for speeds of 140 mph (230 km/h), however speeds over 125 mph require in-cab signalling and this has not been installed. As of August 2012 some units are being lengthened to 11 cars, doubling the standard class seats.

In December 2003, approval was given to run domestic services on the planned Channel Tunnel Rail Link (CTRL) (now High Speed 1) from Kent. In October 2004, Hitachi was announced to be the preferred bidder to supply high speed trains for these services. Preview services began in June 2009, a full regular service starting on 13 December 2009. The Class 395 six-car trains are dual voltage, capable of running on High Speed 1 at 140 mph (225 km/h) and on the classic DC lines at 99 mph (160 km/h).

In 2011, new trains were introduced on London Underground's Victoria line with IGBT driven AC asynchronous electric motors and regenerative braking. As of August 2012 S Stock is being introduced on London Underground sub-surface lines in eight-car sets for the Metropolitan line and seven-car sets for the Circle, District and City and Hammersmith lines. Also with IGBT driven AC asynchronous electric motors and regenerative braking these units have every axle motored and are capable of running from 750 V DC. The first air-conditioned London Underground units there is a wide gangway the length of the train. It is planned that an automatic train operation system will be installed in 2018.

== Planned trains ==
As of December 2010, two-thirds of passenger carriages on Network Rail are in EMUs. Of these 32% are capable of 75 mph (121 km/h), 62% 90 or 100 mph (140 or 160 km/h) and the remaining 7% 125 mph (201 km/h). The most common length is four cars, but they vary from two to 12 cars. Cars are 20-or-23 m-long (66-or-75 ft). Seating capacity depends on the intended use; inner suburban units have lower number of seats giving more room for standing passengers, especially around the doors, and easier access, whereas an intercity high speed train would have comfortable seats.

As of August 2011, a quarter of the railway track in Great Britain is electrified with overhead line and 14% with third rail. Third rail electrification is increasingly seen as outdated and inefficient, although the rolling stock can be cheaper and the clearances needed reduced. Overhead electrification at 25 kV 50 Hz is cheaper to install and operate, more energy efficient, operates better after snowfall and allows more power to be delivered to the train. An economic case can be made for replacing DC electrification with AC when the trackside equipment reaches the end of its life as long as the rolling stock is capable of conversion and costly infrastructure works are not needed. Some lines, such as the Merseyrail tunnels in Liverpool and the Thames Tunnel in the East London Railway may not be suitable for conversion. As London's suburban trains such the Networker and the Class 455 are not suitable for conversion but the outer-suburban Desiro and Electrostar are, conversion of the outer suburban lines with trains changing mode en route is considered the best option. The third rail electrification between Basingstoke and Weymouth needs renewal in the next ten years. In the 2012, High Level Output Specification the Department of Transport asked the rail industry to present plans to convert the line from Basingstoke to Southampton Docks by 2019 as part of a new electrified route from North to South and as a pilot conversion project.

A 2013 long term rolling stock strategy considered that because of the planned electrification programme, predicted growth in rail travel and replacement of older trains in phases, 30,000 train sets would have to have been delivered by 2050; it would have been the largest train building every year.
