= Arriva Trains Northern =

Train operating company in Northern England

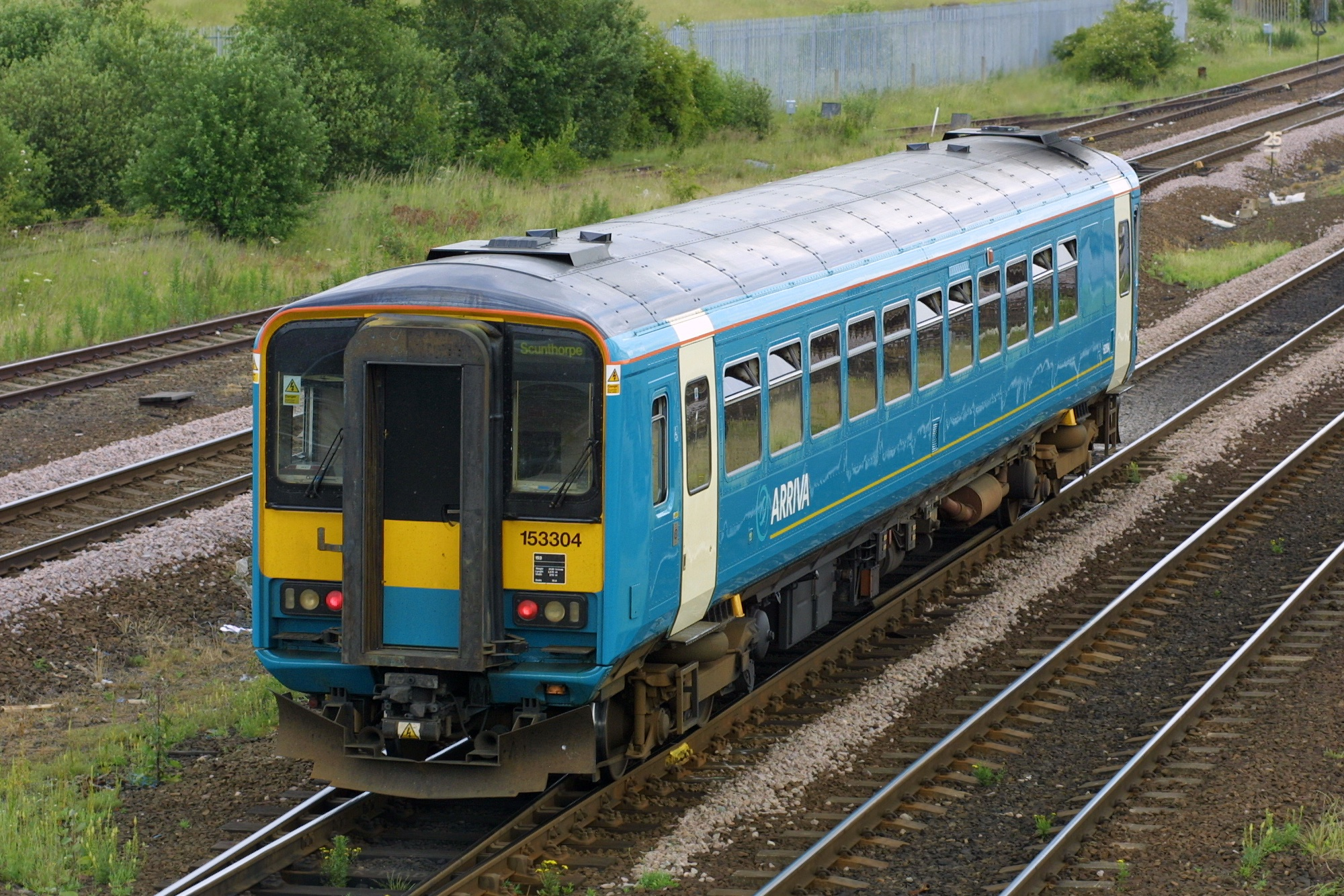
- Class 153 leaving Hatfield and Stainforth

Overview
- Franchises: Regional Railways North East; 2 March 1997 – 11 December 2004
- Main regions: North East; Yorkshire
- Other regions: North West; North Midlands
- Fleet: 169 until February 2004; 141 after February 2004
- Parent company: Arriva
- Reporting mark: AN (NS when Northern Spirit)
- Predecessor: Regional Railways
- Successors: First TransPennine Express; Northern Rail

Other
- Website: arrivatrainsnorthern.co.uk at the Wayback Machine (archived 2004-12-05)

Arriva Trains Northern was a British train operating company owned by Arriva that operated the Regional Railways North East franchise from March 1997 until December 2004.

== History ==
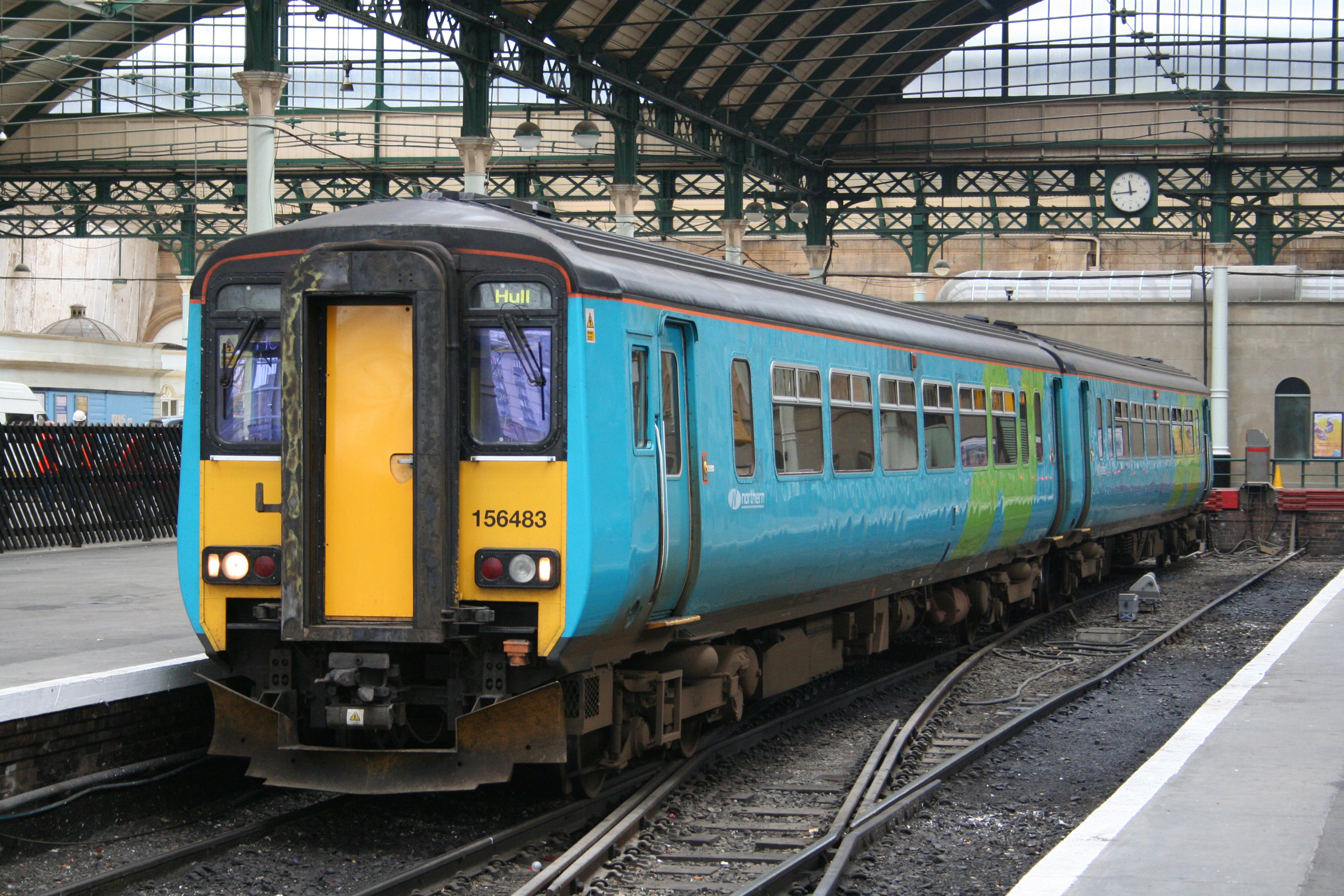
Northern Spirit liveried 156483 at Hull, 2006

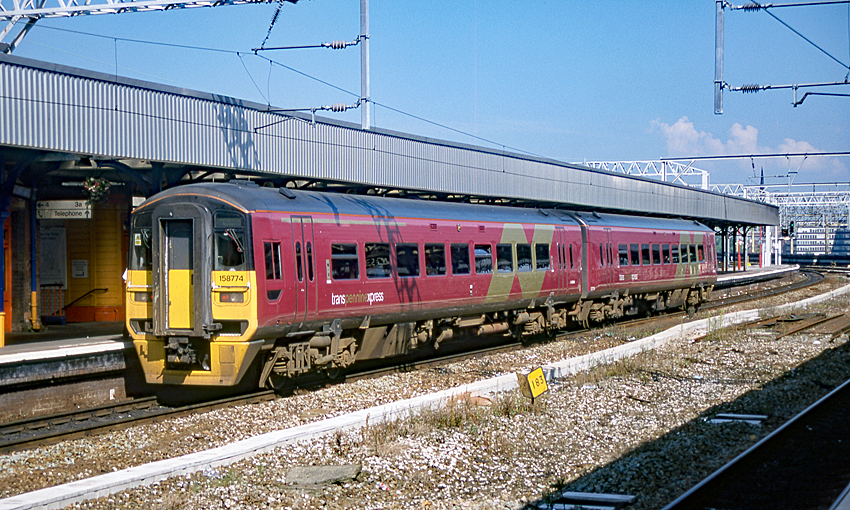
158774 in Trans Pennine Express livery at Stockport

As part of the privatisation of British Rail, the Regional Railways North East franchise was awarded by the Director of Passenger Rail Franchising to MTL after it won the contest from a field of Connex, FirstBus, Grand Central, a management/Via-GTI consortium, National Express, Prism Rail and Stagecoach. The franchise commenced on 2 March 1997.

In May 1998, the franchise was rebranded as Northern Spirit with a livery of turquoise with a lime green stylised italic N across the midsection introduced.

At the same time, the long distance regional services connecting Sunderland, Newcastle, Scarborough and Hull with Manchester, Liverpool and Blackpool were sub-branded under the TransPennine Express banner with rolling stock painted in a base colour of maroon with a gold stylised italic N across the midsection. These services would later become a franchise in their own right from 2004, which is currently operated by TransPennine Express.

On 18 February 2000, MTL was purchased by Arriva, and on 27 April 2001 the franchise was rebranded as Arriva Trains Northern. The Arriva corporate turquoise and stone livery was introduced on refurbished 153352 in July 2001.

== Services ==
Arriva Trains Northern operated a mix of long distance regional, local urban and rural passenger services in the North of England and Yorkshire and the Humber extending across the Pennines.

The network extended from Carlisle and Chathill in the north to Sunderland, Scarborough, Hull and Cleethorpes on the east coast down to Sheffield and across to Manchester, Liverpool, Blackpool and Morecambe on the West Coast.

A daily Leeds to Glasgow Central via the Settle & Carlisle and West Coast Main Lines service was introduced in September 1999, the first time such a service had operated since 1982.

== Problems ==
A long-running dispute with the RMT union lead to a prolonged period of industrial action. As a result, in 2001, the Strategic Rail Authority imposed a £2 million fine. Throughout its life, the franchise suffered a shortage of drivers and rolling stock which led to many cancellations on a daily basis. An emergency timetable was later brought in which cancelled many services on a permanent basis rather than random as before.

== Rolling stock ==
Arriva Trains Northern inherited a fleet of Class 142, Class 144, Class 150, Class 153, Class 155, Class 156, Class 158, Class 308 and Class 321s from Regional Railways.

In September 1998, Northern Spirit traded seven of its Class 142s (142085-091) to Valley Lines in exchange for seven Class 150s (150268-274), although between October and December 2002 these were swapped for unrefurbished units 142072-77 and 142080-083, as 142086-091 had only recently been refurbished by Northern Spirit and Valley Lines wished to start their own refurbishment from scratch. In January 2001, the first of 16 Class 333s ordered to replace the Class 308s, entered service.

A shortage of available rolling stock to meet increasing demand led Arriva Trains Northern to lease Class 37s and ex Virgin CrossCountry Mark 2 carriages from English Welsh & Scottish to top and tail a daily service from Leeds to Carlisle for 12 months from September 2003. It also operated a peak hour Knaresborough to Leeds service.

Some of the rolling stock was owned by the West Yorkshire Passenger Transport Executive and these were repainted red and silver with the Metro logos of the passenger transport executive.

Class	Image	Type	Top speed		Number	Built
Class	Image	Type	mph	km/h	Number	Built
142 Pacer		Diesel multiple unit	75	120	6	1985–1987
144 Pacer		Diesel multiple unit	75	120	23	1986–1987
150 Sprinter		Diesel multiple unit	75	120	10	1985–1987
153 Super Sprinter		Diesel multiple unit	75	120	20	1987–1988
155 Super Sprinter		Diesel multiple unit	75	120	7	1987–1988
156 Super Sprinter		Diesel multiple unit	75	120	46	1987–1989
158 Express Sprinter		Diesel multiple unit	90	145	38	1989–1992
308		Electric multiple unit	75	120	33	1961
321		Electric multiple unit	100	160	3	1991
333		Electric multiple unit	100	160	16	2000–2003
Mark 2 carriage		carriage	100	160	6	1969–1974

== Depots ==
Arriva Trains Northern's fleet was maintained at Heaton depot in Newcastle upon Tyne and Neville Hill depot in Leeds.

== Demise ==
In 2000, the Strategic Rail Authority announced that it planned to create a new TransPennine Express franchise transferring Arriva Train Northern's long distance regional services with the remainder to be combined with those of the Regional Railways North West franchise to form a new Northern Rail franchise.

In July 2003, the Strategic Rail Authority awarded the TransPennine franchise to FirstGroup/Keolis with services operated by Arriva Trains Northern transferring to First TransPennine Express on 1 February 2004.

In July 2004, the Strategic Rail Authority awarded the Northern Rail franchise to a 50:50 joint venture between Serco and NedRailways with the remaining services operated by Arriva Trains Northern transferring to Northern Rail on 12 December 2004.

In 2015, it was announced that Arriva had been awarded the Northern franchise, trading this time as Northern by Arriva. This franchise started in April 2016. However, this franchise was terminated early due to poor performance at the end of February 2020.

Preceded by Regional Railways; As part of British Rail	Operator of the Regional Railways North East franchise 1997–2004	Succeeded by Northern Rail; Northern Rail franchise
Preceded by Regional Railways; As part of British Rail	Operator of the Regional Railways North East franchise 1997–2004	Succeeded by First TransPennine Express; TransPennine Express franchise
