= Platform 1 =

Platform 1 may refer to:

- Platform 1 (charity), a British organisation
- Platform One Media, a studio owned by Boat Rocker Media
- Platform One (band), a South African musical group
