= Northern Rail =

Former British train operating company

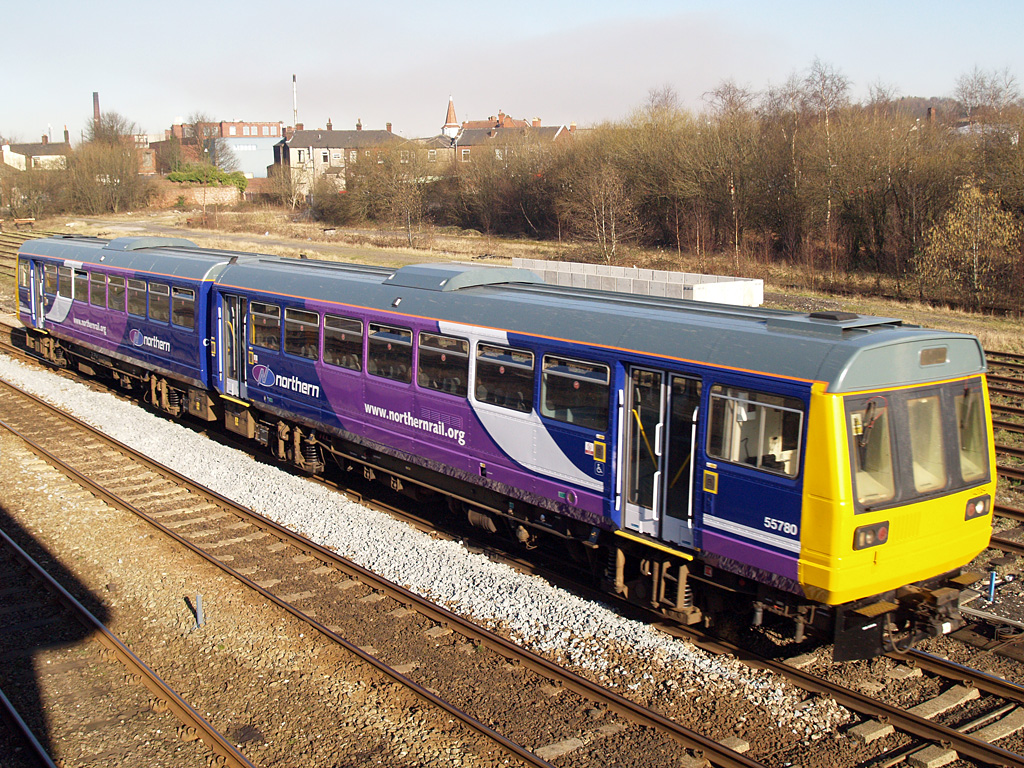
- Class 142 Pacer at Castleton East Junction in 2008

Overview
- Franchises: Northern Rail; 12 December 2004 – 31 March 2016
- Main regions: North West, North East, Yorkshire and the Humber
- Other regions: East Midlands and Staffordshire
- Fleet: 333
- Stations called at: 526
- Stations operated: 464
- Parent company: Serco (50%); Abellio (50%)
- Reporting mark: NT
- Predecessor: Arriva Trains Northern; First North Western
- Successor: Arriva Rail North

Other
- Website: www.northernrail.org

Northern Rail, branded as Northern, was a British train operating company owned by a 50:50 joint venture between Serco and Abellio that operated the Northern Rail franchise from 2004 until 2016. It was the primary passenger train operator in Northern England, and operated the most stations of any train operating company in the United Kingdom. Northern Rail was replaced on 1 April 2016 by Arriva Rail North.

== History ==
In 2000 the Strategic Rail Authority announced that it planned to reorganise the Regional Railways North West and Regional Railways North East franchises operated by First North Western and Arriva Trains Northern. A TransPennine Express franchise would be created for the long-distance regional services, with the remaining services to be operated by a new Northern Rail franchise.

On 1 July 2004 the Strategic Rail Authority awarded the franchise to a 50:50 joint venture between Serco and NedRailways, beating FirstGroup. The franchise was awarded for six years and nine months, with a two-year extension subject to performance targets being achieved.

Serco and NedRailways' bid had assumed that some Class 142 Pacer trains would be released imminently when Manchester Metrolink services started between Manchester and Oldham. Due to a substantial delay in extending the Metrolink, it became clear that this was not going to be the case. As a result, the contract signing was delayed, and the services operated by First North Western and Arriva Trains Northern did not transfer to Northern until 12 December 2004.

In May 2010 the Department for Transport confirmed that Northern had met the performance targets, and the franchise was extended for two years until September 2013. In May 2012 the Department for Transport granted Northern a six-month extension until 31 March 2014. In March 2013 the Secretary of State for Transport announced the franchise would be further extended to February 2016.

In August 2014, the Department for Transport announced Abellio, Arriva and Govia had been shortlisted to bid for the next franchise.

On 9 December 2015, it was announced that Arriva trading as Arriva Rail North had been awarded a new franchise to run from 1 April 2016 through to March 2025.

Before Serco and Abellio's Northern Rail franchise came to an end, unit 158906 received a refurbishment on one of its carriages which included free Wi-Fi, destination displays showing the expected time of arrival, and USB ports at each table.

== Services ==
=== Additional services ===
In December 2008 Northern Rail introduced an express service from Leeds to Nottingham calling at Wakefield Kirkgate, Barnsley, Meadowhall, Sheffield, Dronfield, Chesterfield, Alfreton and Langley Mill using a Class 158 unit. The 10:17 service from Sheffield on Sundays continues to Carlisle creating a direct train service between Sheffield and Carlisle for the first time since the demise of British Rail. The service returns from Carlisle at 15:10.

In May 2015 Northern Rail announced the re-introduction of a direct service between Blackburn and Manchester Victoria via Burnley following the reopening of the Todmorden Curve. The service operates hourly, seven days a week.

=== Former services ===
Services on the route from Thorpes Bridge Junction, Newton Heath to Rochdale East Junction via Oldham, known as the Oldham Loop Line, ceased on 3 October 2009. The line was subsequently converted for Manchester Metrolink operation and reopened as a Metrolink route in 2012.

Northern Electrics was a brand offering electrified rail from Liverpool to Manchester.

== Performance ==
Northern Rail won Public Transport Operator of the Year 2007 at the National Transport Awards and was praised by the judges for attracting 20% more passengers since 2004. When the extension of its franchise was announced, Northern Rail stated that it had improved punctuality from 83.7% in the 12 months to December 2004 to 91.6% in the 12 months to May 2010, meaning that around 200 more trains per day were on time than in 2004.

In the period 15 October 2009 to 14 November 2009, Northern's punctuality was 91.1% and reliability was 92.2%. Northern Rail's passenger charter targets were 91% for punctuality and 99% for reliability.

The franchise agreement commits to a 15% reduction in delays in the first five years and to a new 'incentive/penalty regime' and a more 'local focus on performance'.

The latest official figures released by NR (Network Rail) rate punctuality (PPM) at 91.9% and an MAA of 90.7% for period 7 (2013/2014) and the 12 months up to 12 October 2013.

The annual report for 2012, published in March 2013, of the Nederlandse Spoorwegen stated that Northern Rail transported 263,000 passengers daily. The customer satisfaction decreased to 80%. In May 2011 Northern Rail received the "Sustainable Business of the Year" award.

== Criticism ==
=== Approach to fare evasion ===
Northern Rail had a reputation for its rather tough approach on fare evasion, and was known to take passengers to court for underpaying by a matter of pence.

== Rolling stock ==
Northern Rail operated a large diesel fleet, which was used on most services. There was also a smaller electric fleet used on shorter distance services around Leeds and Manchester and on services between Liverpool and Manchester.

Northern Rail inherited a fleet of Class 142, 144, 150, 153, 155, 156 and 158 diesel multiple units and Class 321, 323 and 333 electric multiple units from Arriva Trains Northern and First North Western.

In October 2006 Northern Rail leased six former Central Trains Class 158s that had been on loan to First Great Western.

In March 2007 Northern Rail announced it would be acquiring a further 30 Class 158s from Arriva Trains Wales, Central Trains and First Great Western to replace 26 Class 142 Pacers. In the event, Northern Rail received only 19 Class 158s, but did gain eight centre carriages from East Midlands Trains in 2008 that were inserted into Northern Rail's ex-First North Western Class 158s. Twelve of the Class 142s were placed in store, then sublet to First Great Western from late 2007; five were returned to Northern Rail in the autumn of 2008 with the remaining seven following in the autumn of 2011.

From December 2008 until December 2011 Northern Rail leased three Class 180s for use on Blackpool North to Manchester Victoria and Hazel Grove services.

From July 2011 Northern Rail received 18 Class 150s from London Midland. In 2011, Northern Rail received the five former Stansted Express Class 322s from First ScotRail.

In March 2015 the first Class 319s entered service on the Liverpool Lime Street to Manchester Airport service.

=== Fleet at end of franchise ===
Class	Image	Type	Top speed		Number	Routes	Built
Class	Image	Type	mph	km/h	Number	Routes	Built
37		Loco	80	130	2	Cumbrian Coast Line (Monday to Saturday only); Loco-hauled services were operated by Direct Rail Services on behalf of Northern Rail.	1960–1965
Mark 2 carriage		Coach	80	130	6	Cumbrian Coast Line (Monday to Saturday only); Loco-hauled services were operated by Direct Rail Services on behalf of Northern Rail.	1963–1975
Mark 2 carriage		DBSO	80	130	2	Cumbrian Coast Line (Monday to Saturday only); Loco-hauled services were operated by Direct Rail Services on behalf of Northern Rail.	1974
142 Pacer		DMU	75	120	79	Manchester Victoria – Southport/Kirkby; Chester – Manchester Piccadilly; Southport – Chester (Sundays only); Manchester Piccadilly – New Mills/Rose Hill Marple/Sheffield; Leeds – Morecambe/Lancaster/Sheffield/York; Liverpool Lime St – Manchester Oxford Rd/Blackpool North; Huddersfield – Manchester Victoria; Colne – Blackpool South; Cumbrian Coast Line; Newcastle – Hexham/Middlesbrough; Bishop Auckland/Darlington – Saltburn; Middlesbrough – Hexham; Crewe/Alderley Edge/Macclesfield – Manchester Piccadilly; Stockport – Stalybridge (one train a week, northbound only); MetroCentre & Newcastle – Morpeth & Chathill; Sheffield – Lincoln; Sheffield – Brigg – Cleethorpes (Saturdays only); Hull – York; Blackburn – Manchester Victoria	1985–1987
144 Pacer		DMU	75	120	23	Leeds – Harrogate/York/Manchester Victoria (stopper)/Huddersfield/Goole/Sheffield/Morecambe; Sheffield/Wakefield Westgate – Huddersfield; Sheffield – Scunthorpe/Lincoln; Sheffield – Brigg – Cleethorpes (Saturdays only); Sheffield – Barnsley – Penistone – Huddersfield; Also seen sometimes pulling Class 158s on the Caldervale line during peak time.	1986–1987
150/1 Sprinter		DMU	75	120	30	Manchester Victoria – Clitheroe/Leeds/Selby; Colne – Blackpool South; Manchester Piccadilly – Buxton/Sheffield/Rose Hill Marple; Liverpool Lime Street – Blackpool North/Manchester Oxford Rd; Manchester Victoria/Airport – Wigan Wallgate/Southport/Kirkby; Chester – Manchester Piccadilly; Southport – Altrincham – Chester (Sundays only); Blackburn – Manchester Victoria; Huddersfield – Manchester Victoria	1984–1987
150/2 Sprinter		DMU	75	120	28	Manchester Victoria – Clitheroe/Leeds; Huddersfield – Selby; Colne – Blackpool South; Wakefield Kirkgate – Knottingley; Manchester Piccadilly – Buxton/Sheffield/Rose Hill Marple; Liverpool Lime Street – Blackpool North/Manchester Oxford Rd; Manchester Victoria/Airport – Wigan Wallgate/Southport; Chester – Altrincham – Manchester Piccadilly; Southport – Altrincham – Chester (Sundays only); Blackburn – Manchester Victoria; Huddersfield – Manchester Victoria; York – Knaresborough/Harrogate/Burley Park (Leeds); Leeds – Harrogate/Knaresborough/Poppleton (York)	1984–1987
153 Super Sprinter		DMU	75	120	18	Manchester Victoria – Clitheroe; Colne – Blackpool South; Preston – Ormskirk; Leeds – Knottingley; Wakefield Kirkgate – Knottingley; Morecambe/Heysham Port/Lancaster – Barrow in Furness/Maryport/Carlisle (Cumbrian Coast Line); Cleethorpes – Barton-on-Humber (Barton Line); Also seen coupled to other trains for additional capacity, sometimes seen in South Yorkshire replacing services usually run by Pacers.	1987–1988 (converted 1991–1992)
155 Super Sprinter		DMU	75	120	7	Leeds – Harrogate/Knaresborough/Poppleton (York); York – Knaresborough/Harrogate/Burley Park (Leeds); Leeds – Bradford – Manchester Victoria; Leeds – Brighouse – Manchester Victoria (Mondays to Saturdays only)	1988
156 Super Sprinter		DMU	75	120	42	Colne – Blackpool South (Sundays only); Cumbrian Coast Line; Newcastle – Carlisle; Blackpool North – Manchester Victoria; Preston – Hazel Grove; Liverpool Lime Street – Blackpool North/Manchester Oxford Road; Manchester Piccadilly – Rose Hill Marple/Buxton/Sheffield; Helsby – Ellesmere Port/Warrington Bank Quay; Manchester Victoria/Airport – Wigan Wallgate/Southport/Kirkby; Chester – Manchester Piccadilly; Southport – Altrincham – Chester (Sundays only); Nunthorpe – Hexham (select journeys only); Middlesbrough – Whitby; Middlesbrough – Carlisle (select journeys only; 2 were transferred to East Midlands Trains 2012 to 2013)	1987–1989
158/7 Express Sprinter		DMU	90	140	35	Express services including: York – Blackpool North; Nottingham – Sheffield – Barnsley – Leeds; Hull – York; Sheffield/Hull – Bridlington/Scarborough; Leeds – Carlisle; Leeds – Brighouse – Manchester Victoria (Mondays to Saturdays only); Leeds – Bradford – Manchester Victoria; Also occasionally seen on the Harrogate Line and other services as a replacement for booked Class 142/144/150s etc.	1989–1992
158/9 Express Sprinter		DMU	90	140	10	Express services including: York – Blackpool North; Nottingham – Sheffield – Barnsley – Leeds; Hull – York; Sheffield/Hull – Bridlington/Scarborough; Leeds – Carlisle; Leeds – Brighouse – Manchester Victoria (Mondays to Saturdays only); Leeds – Bradford – Manchester Victoria; Also occasionally seen on the Harrogate Line and other services as a replacement for booked Class 142/144/150s etc.	1989–1992
319/3		EMU	100	160	20	Electrified services out of Liverpool Lime Street: Liverpool Lime Street – Manchester Airport/Manchester Victoria/Warrington Bank Quay; Liverpool Lime Street – Wigan North Western; Liverpool Lime Street/Liverpool South Parkway – Preston; Manchester Piccadilly – Manchester Airport	1990
321/9		EMU	100	160	3	Wakefield Line; Leeds – Doncaster; Also used on peak-time weekday services on the Airedale and Wharfedale lines.	1991
322		EMU	100	160	5	Wakefield Line; Leeds – Doncaster; Also used on peak-time weekday services on the Airedale and Wharfedale lines.	1990
323		EMU	90	140	17	Electrified routes in and out of Manchester Piccadilly: Manchester Piccadilly – Alderley Edge/Crewe/Glossop/Hadfield/Hazel Grove/Macclesfield/Manchester Airport/Stoke-on-Trent/Manchester United Football Ground (selected matchdays only)	1992–1995
333		EMU	100	160	16	Leeds/Bradford Forster Square – Ilkley (Wharfedale Line); Leeds/Bradford Forster Square – Skipton (Airedale Line); Leeds – Bradford Forster Square	2000–2003

== Stations ==
In 2009, Northern Rail operated 471 stations; more than any other train operating company in the UK. The number fell to 462 later in the same year following closure of the Oldham Loop Line, and increased to 463 by 2013. New stations include Buckshaw Parkway in 2011, and James Cook in 2014. By 2013, trains operated by Northern Rail called at 526 stations.

== Depots ==
The maintenance depots used by Northern Rail were located at:

- Allerton (AN)
- Blackpool North LMD (BP)
- Barrow-in-Furness (BW) (Overnight cleaning)
- Buxton (BX) (Overnight Cleaning)
- Carlisle Station (Overnight cleaning)
- Heaton (Newcastle upon Tyne) (HT)
- Hull Botanic Gardens (BG)
- Longsight TMD (Manchester) (LG)
- Neville Hill (Leeds) (NL)
- Leeds Holbeck (HO) (Light maintenance and Refurbishments)
- Newton Heath TMD (Manchester) (NH)
- Sheffield Station (SM)
- Stockport Carriage Sidings (SQ) (Light maintenance and cleaning)
- Skipton Broughton Road Carriage sidings (333 Stabling)
- Workington (WK) (overnight cleaning for Cumbrian Coast)
- Wigan Wallgate Carriage Sidings (Overnight cleaning)

The train crew depots were located at:

- Leeds
- York
- Newcastle
- Darlington (Driver only)
- Middlesbrough (guard only)
- Carlisle
- Workington
- Blackpool North
- Liverpool Lime Street
- Wigan Wallgate
- Manchester Victoria
- Manchester Piccadilly
- Buxton
- Sheffield
- Skipton
- Huddersfield
- Harrogate
- Hull Paragon
- Barrow-in-Furness
- Doncaster

To run the Cleethorpes to Barton service, one class 153 was stabled at Cleethorpes overnight and was cleaned, the train crew which ran the service were First TransPennine Express staff.

Preceded by Arriva Trains Northern; Regional Railways North East franchise	Operator of Northern Rail franchise 2004–2016	Succeeded by Arriva Rail North; Northern franchise
Preceded by First North Western; North West Regional Railways franchise	Operator of Northern Rail franchise 2004–2016	Succeeded by Arriva Rail North; Northern franchise
