= British Rail Class 144 =

British class of diesel multiple unit trains

British Rail Class 144 Pacer
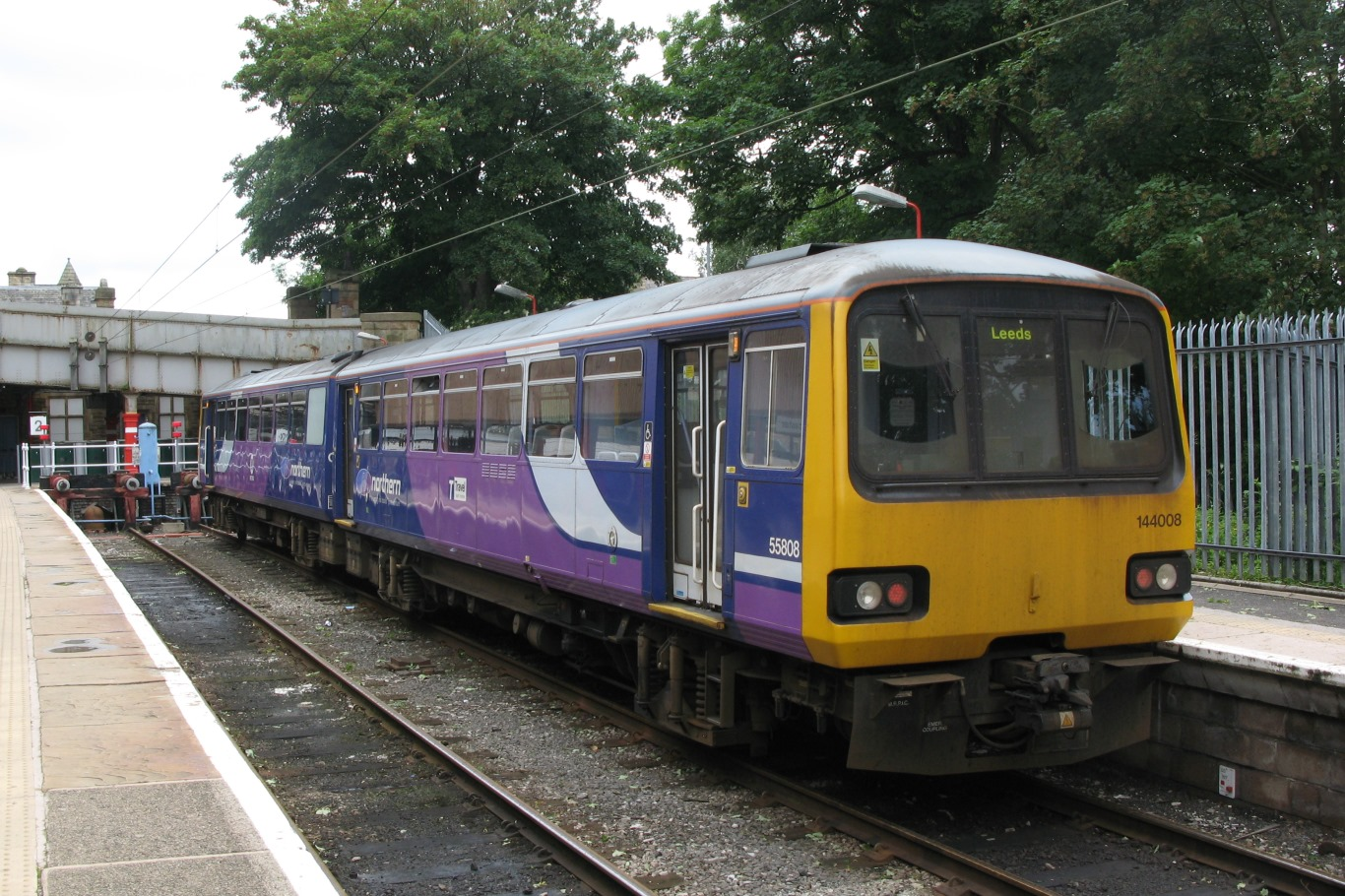
- A Northern Rail Class 144 at Lancaster (2012)

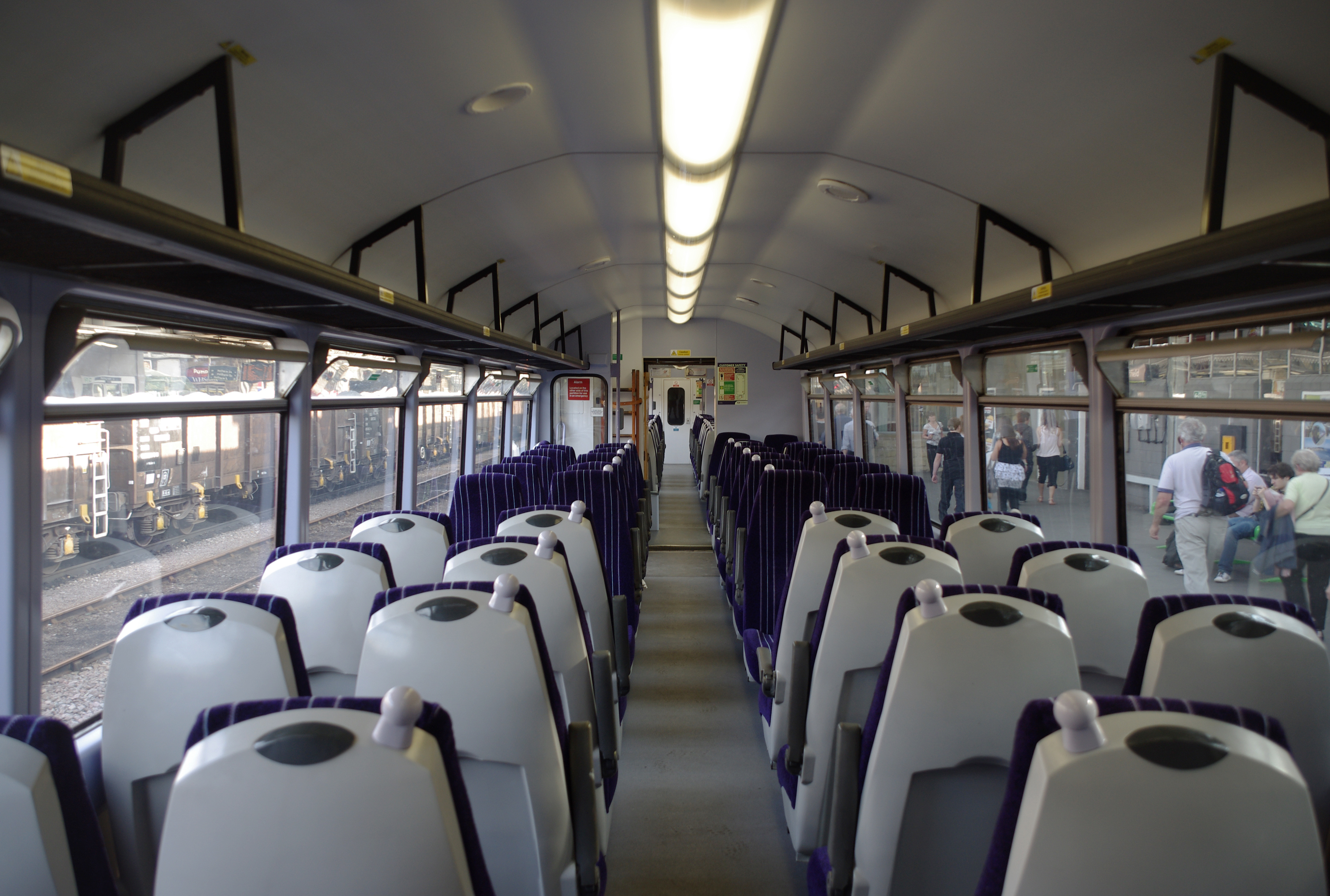
- Northern Rail refurbished Class 144 saloon
- In service: 1986–2020
- Manufacturers: British Rail Engineering Limited; Walter Alexander Coachbuilders
- Order nos.: 31015 (DMS vehicles); 31016 (DMSL vehicles); 31037 (MS vehicles)
- Family name: Pacer
- Constructed: 1986–1987
- Refurbished: 2002–2004; 2010
- Number built: 23 (13 × 2-car, 10 × 3-car)
- Number preserved: 19
- Number scrapped: 4
- Formation: 2 or 3 cars per unit: DMS-DMSL; DMS-MS-DMSL
- Diagram: DMS vehicles: DP240; MS vehicles: DR205; DMSL vehicles: DP241
- Fleet numbers: 144001–144013 (2-car units); 144014–144023 (3-car units)
- Capacity: In 2-abreast configuration: 104 or 162 seats; In 3-abreast configuration: 122 or 195 seats
- Owner: Porterbrook
- Operators: Arriva Rail North; Arriva Trains Northern; British Rail; Network Rail; Northern Rail; Northern Trains; Regional Railways
- Depot: Neville Hill (Leeds)
- Lines served: Airedale Line; Caldervale Line; Hallam Line; Harrogate Line; Huddersfield Line; Penistone Line; Pontefract Line; Wakefield Line; York and Selby Lines

Specifications
- Car body construction: Steel underframe, aluminium alloy body and roof
- Car length: DM vehs.: 15.093 m (49 ft 6.2 in); MS vehs.: 15.186 m (49 ft 9.9 in)
- Width: 2.695 m (8 ft 10.1 in)
- Height: 3.725 m (12 ft 2.7 in)
- Floor height: 1.288 m (4 ft 2.7 in)
- Doors: Double-leaf folding (3 or 5 per side)
- Wheelbase: 9.000 m (29 ft 6.3 in)
- Maximum speed: 75 mph (121 km/h)
- Weight: As built; DMS vehs.: 24.17 t (23.79 long tons; 26.64 short tons); MS vehs.: 23.50 t (23.13 long tons; 25.90 short tons); DMSL vehs.:25.04 t (24.64 long tons; 27.60 short tons)
- Axle load: Route Availability 1
- Prime movers: As built: 2 or 3 × Leyland TL11; After upgrade: 2 or 3 × Cummins LTA10-R; (one per vehicle)
- Engine type: Inline-6 4-stroke turbo-diesel
- Displacement: Leyland: 11.1 L (680 cu in); Cummins: 10.0 L (610 cu in); (per engine)
- Power output: Leyland: 149 kW (200 hp); Cummins: 168 kW (225 hp); (per engine)
- Transmission: As built: SCG RRE5 (4-sp. epicyclic); After upgrade: Voith T 211 r (hydrokinetic)
- Minimum turning radius: 70 m (230 ft)
- Braking system: Electro-pneumatic (tread)
- Safety systems: AWS; TPWS
- Coupling system: BSI
- Multiple working: Within class and with Classes 14x, 15x and 170
- Track gauge: 1,435 mm (4 ft 8 1/2 in) standard gauge

Notes/references
- Specifications as at December 1987 except where otherwise noted.

The British Rail Class 144 Pacer is a retired class of diesel multiple unit (DMU) passenger trains built at Derby between 1986 and 1987. British Rail, seeking to procure improved derivatives of the earlier Class 141, placed an order with the manufacturers British Rail Engineering Limited (BREL) and Walter Alexander to construct their own variant, the Class 144. A total of 23 units were constructed. All units were retired from main line service by 2020, though the majority of the units have been acquired for preservation on heritage railways and for other uses. As of December 2022, 19 units have been purchased following withdrawal, of which 14 are in operational condition.

== Background ==
By the beginning of the 1980s, British Rail (BR) operated a large fleet of first generation DMUs, which had been constructed in prior decades to various designs. While formulating its long-term strategy for this sector of its operations, BR planners recognised that there would be considerable costs incurred by undertaking refurbishment programmes necessary for the continued use of these aging multiple units, particularly due to the necessity of handling and removing hazardous materials such as asbestos. In light of the high costs involved in retention, planners examined the prospects for the development and introduction of a new generation of DMUs to succeed the first generation.

In the concept stage, two separate approaches were devised, one involving a so-called railbus that prioritised the minimisation of both initial (procurement) and ongoing (maintenance & operational) costs, while the second was a more substantial DMU that could deliver superior performance than the existing fleet, particularly when it came to long-distance services. While the more ambitious latter requirement would ultimately lead to the development of the Class 150 and the wider Sprinter group of DMUs, BR officials recognised that a cheaper unit was desirable for service on the smaller branch lines that would not be unduly impacted by lower performance specs or a high density configuration. As such, work to progress both approaches was undertaken by BR's research department during the early 1980s.

During this period, a number of prototypes were constructed to explore different designs and approaches for implementing the railbus concept. One such vehicle was a single two-car unit, designated as the Class 140, that was constructed between 1979 and 1981. This prototype was introduced with much fanfare during June 1981. Initial testing with the Class 140 uncovered several issues, such as difficulty detecting the type via track circuits; this was reliably resolved by swapping the material of the brake blocks from a composite to iron. Two less easily addressable drawbacks were the high level of noise generated during transit, particularly on older jointed rails, which was a consequence of the railbus's direct connection between the underframe and suspension with the body that transmitted impact forces across the body. It was also observed that the inclusion of strengthening members in the mass-produced bus body added significantly to the overall production cost, which eliminated much of the cost advantage that was the primarily goal of the type.

The Class 140 was viewed to be an overall success, and thus BR issued an order for an initial production model, designated Class 141, to British Leyland during 1984 with production commencing thereafter. During its early years of service, the Class 141 experienced numerous issues, particularly with the transmission and ride quality; work undertaken at BR's direct resulted in the quick development of numerous improvements to at least partially address these shortcomings. When it came to ordering more railbuses, however, it was decided that instead of placing these follow-on orders for further Class 141, it would be more desirable to procure improved derivatives of the Class 141. Accordingly, BR placed orders for two new models of the Pacer family with separate manufacturers, these being the Class 142 and Class 143 respectively. Thereafter, another and final Pacer model would be ordered, this being the Class 144.

== Description ==
A total of 23 Class 144 units were constructed. The units have a maximum speed of 75 mph (121 km/h) and are externally similar to the earlier Class 143 Pacers, sharing a near-identical body built by Walter Alexander. The first thirteen of the class – numbers 144001 to 144013 – are two-car units, while the remaining ten – 144014 to 144023 – have a third vehicle that was added later. These ten Pacers are the only ones to use intermediate vehicles.

Units are formed of two driving motors, one of which contains a toilet. The three-car units have an additional intermediate motor. All vehicles have standard-class seating only. The technical description of the formation is DMS-(MS-)DMSL. Individual vehicles are numbered as follows:

- DMS: 55801–55823
- MS: 55850–55859 (units 144014–144023 only)
- DMSL: 55824–55846.

As originally built, the traction arrangement of the Class 142 consisted of a 200 horsepower (150 kW) Leyland TL11 engine, a Self-Changing Gears mechanical automatic gearbox and a Gmeinder final drive unit on each car driving only a single axle. This propulsion arrangement was in part taken from the Leyland National bus, as well as shared with the earlier Class 141. Starting in the early 1990s, every member of the class was mechanically upgraded due to the original parts being determined to be a major source of unreliability. The most substantial change was the replacement of the Leyland-built engine with a more powerful Cummins LTA10-R as well as the original mechanical transmission being substituted for a Voith hydrokinetic unit.

The Class 144 units are equipped with BSI couplers. This allows them to work in multiple with Classes 142, 143, 150, 153, 155, 156, 158, 165, 166 and 170 units, as well as units of the same class.

== Operations ==
=== British Rail ===
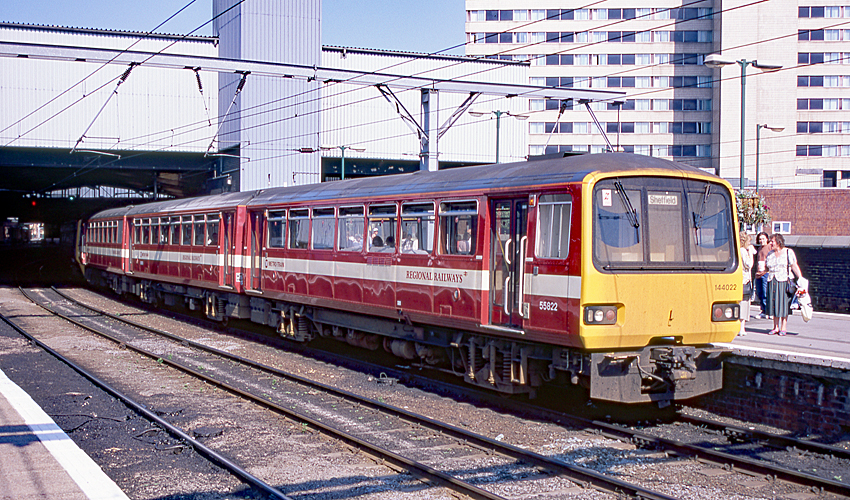
A Class 144 three- car unit in West Yorkshire PTE livery at Leeds in 1996

The first Class 144 units were delivered during 1986. They were produced specifically to perform local services sponsored by the West Yorkshire Passenger Transport Executive (since rebranded as Metro). As such, the fleet was painted in the crimson/cream West Yorkshire Metro livery, although three units (nos. 144011–013) were later repainted into Regional Railways livery. During the British Rail era, the type was normally used on services such as the Harrogate Line between York, Harrogate, and Leeds, the Huddersfield Line's Wakefield section between Leeds and Huddersfield, along with the Huddersfield branch of the Calder Vale line. Class 144s were also operated on the Hallam Line between Leeds, Barnsley, and Sheffield; the Penistone Line between Huddersfield, Barnsley, and Sheffield; and the Pontefract Line between Wakefield and Pontefract.

The Class 144 was also tasked with additional routes, including the Leeds-Morecambe services, services between Scunthorpe and Adwick to Sheffield and Lincoln. From 2008, they operated services between Manchester Victoria and Leeds (usually via Brighouse) amongst others. Prior to 1994, they were also used on Leeds/Bradford-Ilkley and Leeds/Bradford-Skipton services. These lines were electrified in 1994, and passenger services were operated by Class 308 electric multiple units.

Early operations of the type were marred by unreliability to the extent where the Class 144 was commonly substituted for at the last minute by either first generation DMUs or locomotive-hauled trains. Their poor serviceability was common to all production Pacer types. According to industry periodical Rail magazine, the Class 144's mechanical transmission was frequently attributed as being the largely single cause of these issues, while undesirable instances of wheel slippage was another common occurrence. As a consequence, the propulsion systems of not only the Class 144 but its Classes 142 and 143 siblings were replaced after only a few years of service. This refit not only resolved much of the unreliability issues but also gave the Pacer greater acceleration through the installation of a more powerful engine.

=== Privatisation era ===
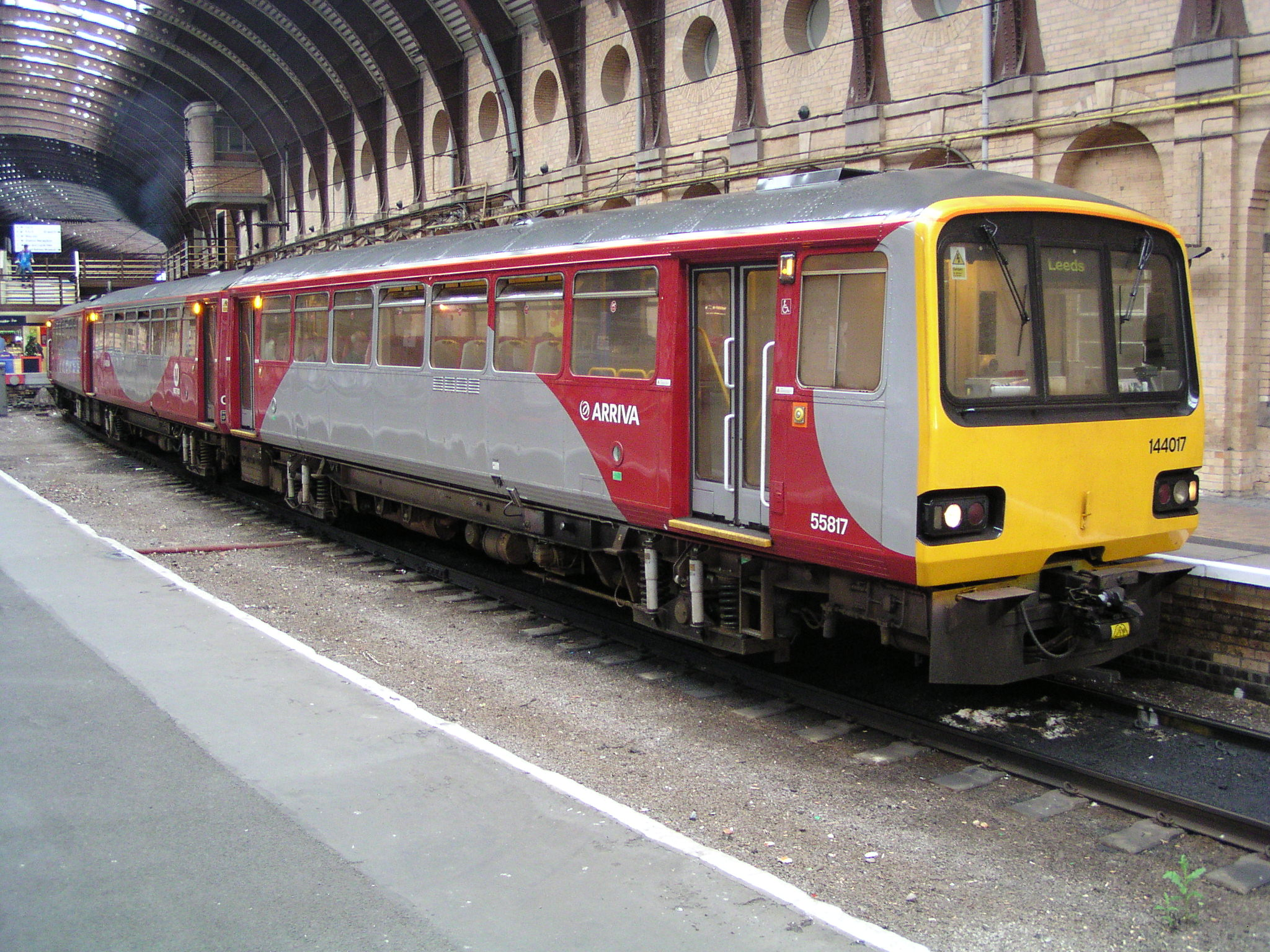
Refurbished Class 144 in Arriva Trains Northern/WYPTE Metro livery, at York in 2004

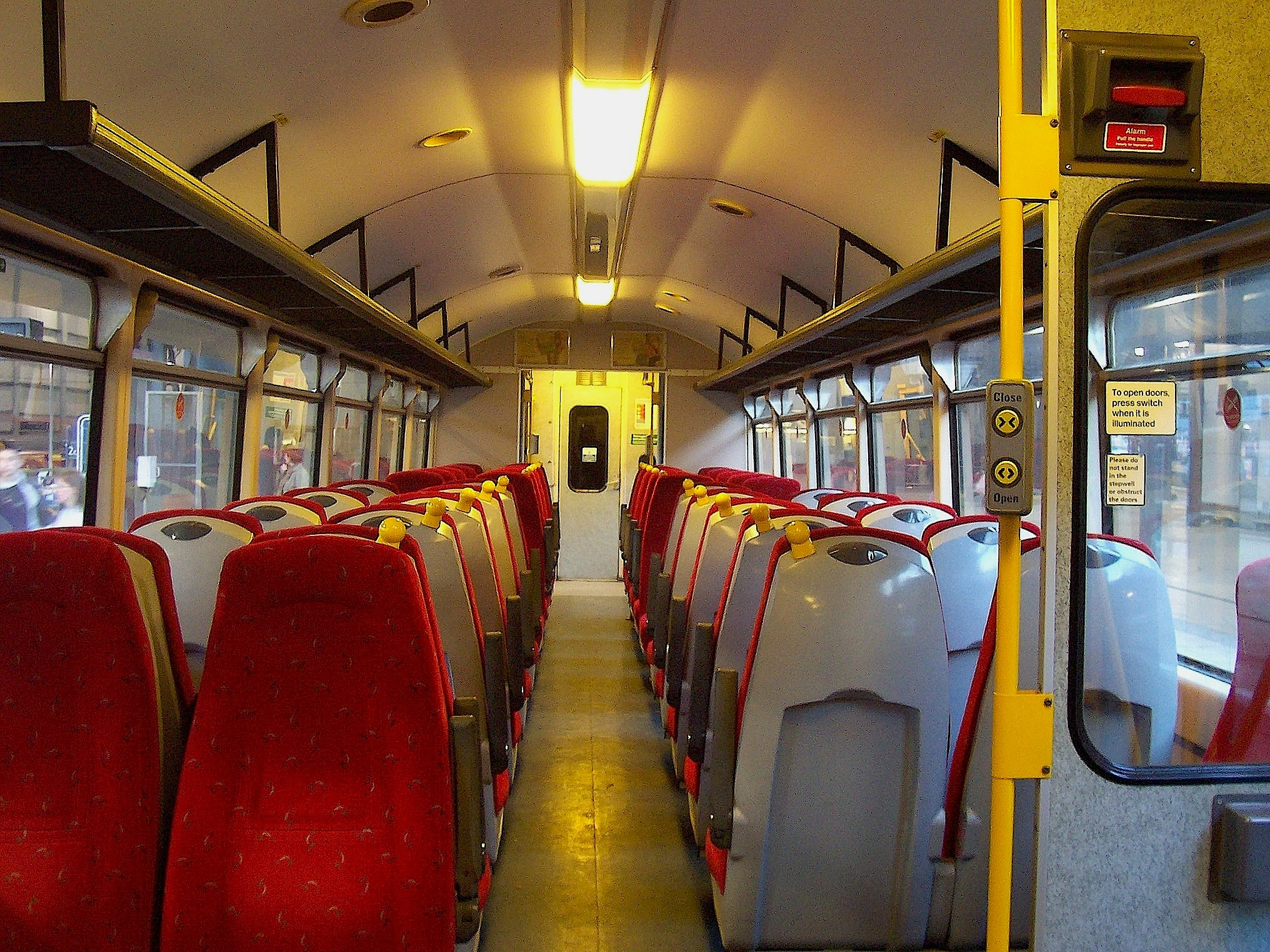
Saloon after Arriva Northern/WYPTE Metro refurbishment

Since the privatisation of British Rail, the Class 144 has been operated by several franchises. The first private operator was Northern Spirit, which was later taken over by Arriva Trains Northern; the latter opted to refurbish its fleet between 2002 and 2004 to enable its continued service. Post-refurbishment, the units emerging in a new silver and red Metro livery complete with refurbished interior. In December 2004, the fleet was transferred to the then-new Northern rail franchise. Northern Rail replaced the silver and red Metro livery with Northern Purple and Blue. By April 2010, all Class 144s had been repainted into this new livery.

Around 2010, Northern Rail subjected their fleet of Class 144s to another refurbishment programme. The first unit to be refurbished was 144006; it had also the first one to be refurbished in the joint Arriva Trains Northern/WYPTE Metro programme in 2002. The refurbishment enhancements involved numerous interior changes, including the installation of 'easy to mop' flooring, an extended area for bike storage at one end of the car by removing a bulkhead wall and extending the perch seats from three to four, repainted hand grips and stanchions, new dado side panels and repainted wall ends, retrimmed seats in the purple Northern Rail moquette, a repainted ceiling, and repainted driving cab.

During April 2016, Northern Rail's Class 144s were all transferred to the new franchisee Arriva Rail North; in turn, Northern Trains took over operations of the fleet on 1 March 2020.

Rail Vehicle Accessibility (Interoperable Rail System) Regulations 2008 and the subsequent Persons of Reduced Mobility - Technical Specification for Interoperability (PRM-TSI) require that all public passenger trains must be accessible by 1 January 2020. As originally delivered, the Class 144 does not meets this requirement and has to be withdrawn without modifications to become compliant. During the 2010s, the rolling stock leasing company Porterbrook proposed an extensive refurbishment of the Class 143 and Class 144 fleets with the purpose of satisfying the diverse needs of this requirement; it was noted that the envisioned modifications would necessitate a significant reduction in the number of seats available. All were to be withdrawn by December 2019. Northern ordered the Class 195 and Class 331 units to replace the Pacers, as well as taking on spare stock from other operators. However, due to the late delivery of the new trains, the 144s were to remain in service in the South Yorkshire area until the middle of 2020. Northern accordingly sought and received a dispensation allowing continued use until 31 August 2020, on certain specified routes only.

=== Withdrawal ===
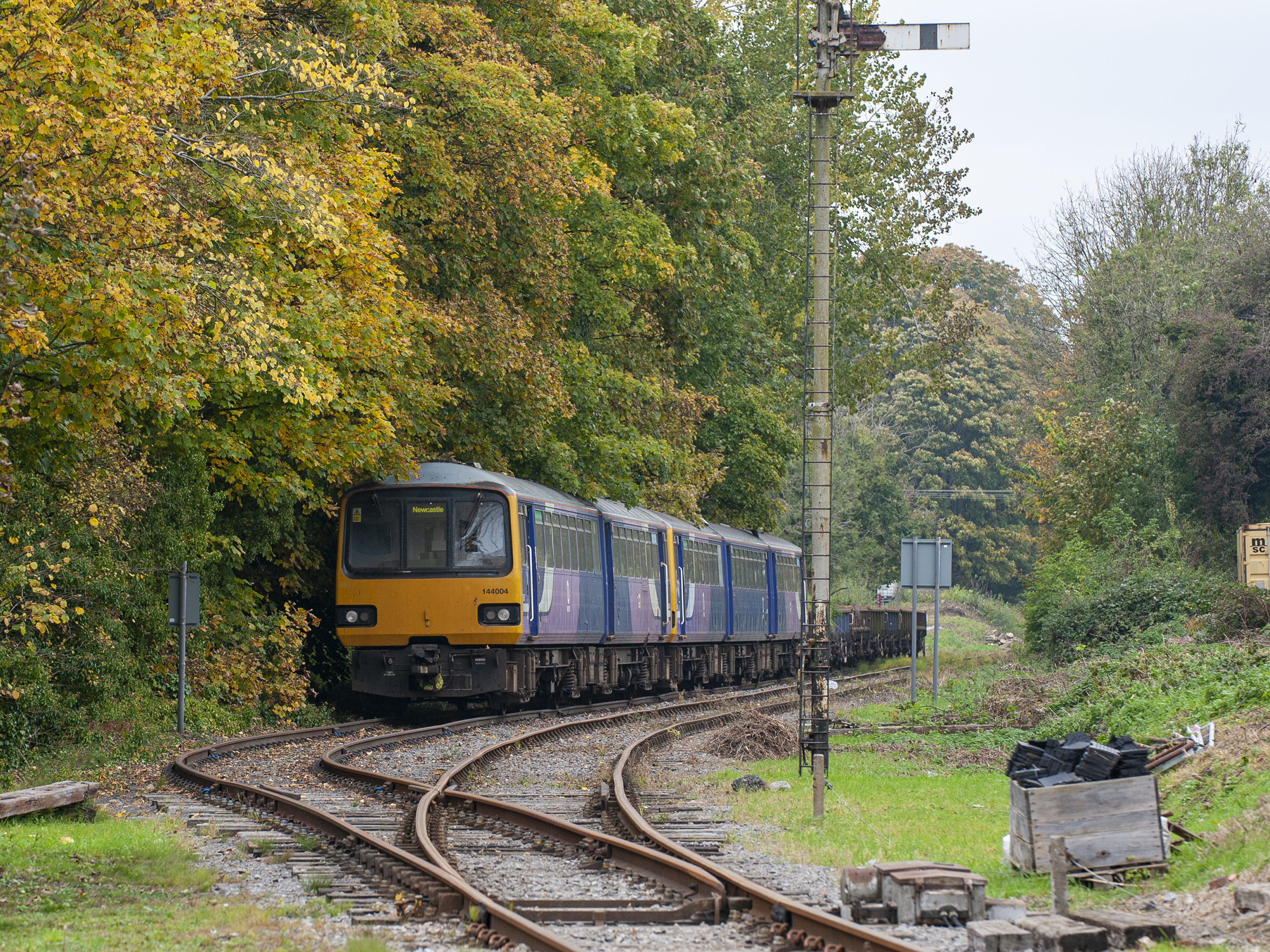
Two ex-Northern Rail Class 144s stored at Bedale on the Wensleydale Railway, prior to being preserved

Following the outbreak of COVID-19 in the UK in March 2020 and the resulting curtailment of passenger services, Northern withdrew the entire fleet prematurely and, by mid-April, had placed all 23 units in storage; 18 units at the Keighley and Worth Valley Railway and the remaining five at Heaton Traction Maintenance Depot in Newcastle upon Tyne. Three units were subsequently scrapped, while the other 20 were distributed to preservation groups and other non-railway users.

== Class 144e ==
The Class 144 Evolution (or 144e) proposal was publicised by fleet owner Porterbrook in 2015, as a way of bringing the fleet into compliance with the PRM-TSI requirements and thus extending its life past the compliance deadline at the end of 2019. One unit, number 144012, was refurbished to the Evolution standard and displayed as a proof-of-concept of upgrades including:

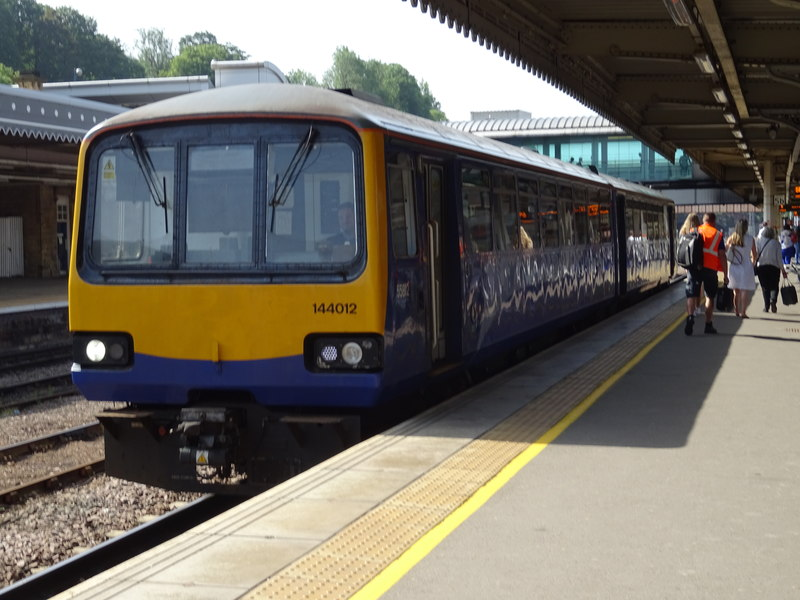
Class 144e unit

- installation of a universally-accessible toilet
- provision of two wheelchair spaces
- provision of a luggage rack and space for two bicycles,
- installation of new Fainsa seats
- installation of passenger wi-fi
- installation of passenger information displays and automatic voice announcements,
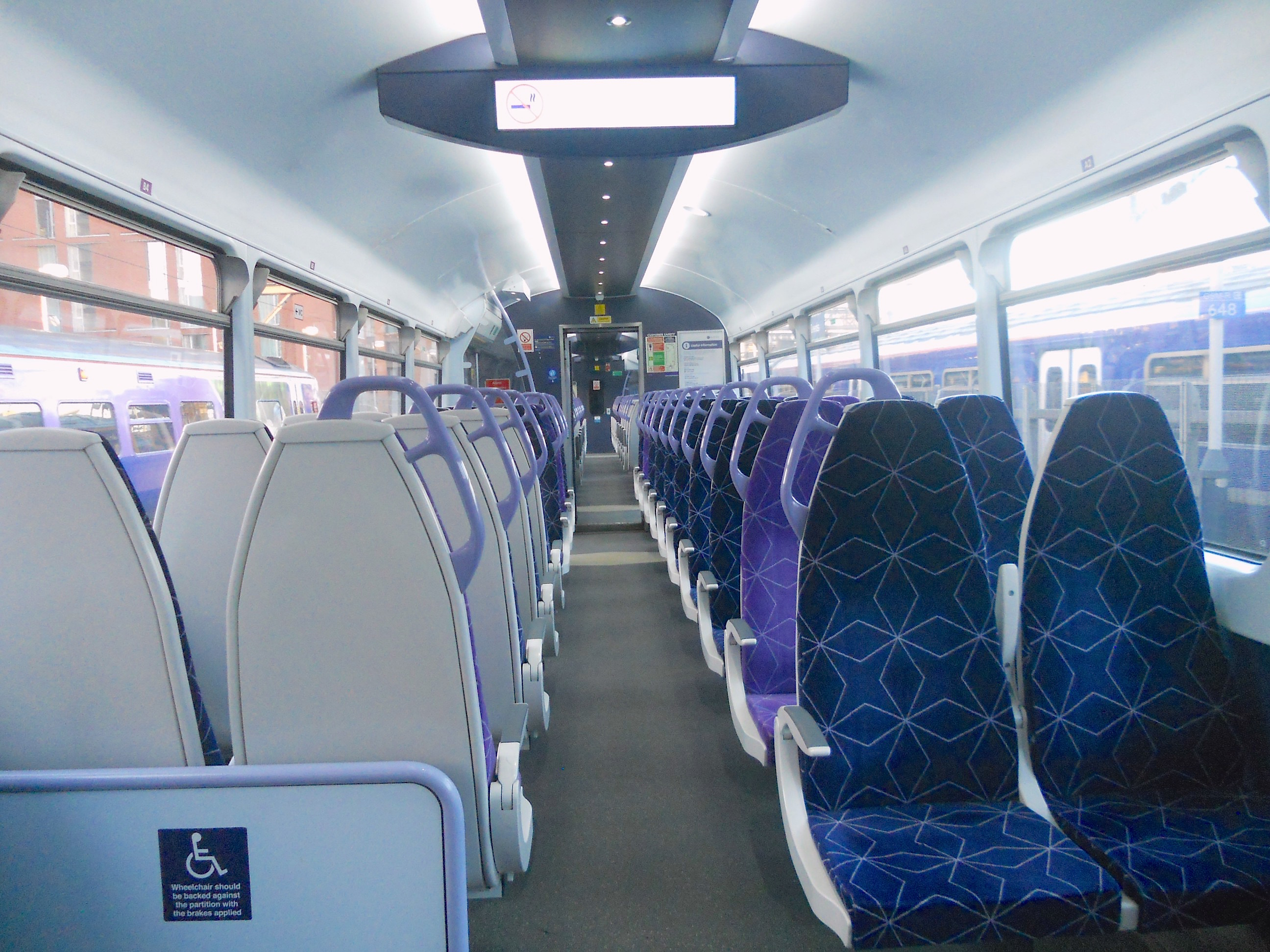
  Class 144e saloon
- installation of CCTV in the saloon, along with forward-facing cameras in the cabs, and,
- conversion of internal lighting from fluorescent to LED.

Porterbrook stated that it had paid £800,000 to prepare the demonstrator unit, but claimed that a price of £175,000 per train carriage, totalling £350,000 per two-car train or £525,000 per three-car train, could be achieved in volume production. It was planned that the demonstrator would enter public service in April 2015, but this was delayed until later in the year. Following withdrawal it was sold in 2021 to Network Rail, but later scrapped.

== Incidents ==
A Northern Rail three-car Class 144 unit caught fire near Smithy Bridge in Rochdale on 21 November 2013.

== Fleet details ==
A total of 23 Class 144 units were built. The first thirteen of the class (nos. 144001 to 144013) are two-car units, while the remaining ten (nos. 144014 to 144023) have a third vehicle that was added later in 1987.

Class	Status	Qty.	Year built	Cars per unit	Unit nos.
144	Converted for non-railway use	4	1986–1987	2	144001–144002, 144008, 144010
144	Preserved	8	1986–1987	2	144003, 144004–144007, (Note: Vehicle 55828 of 144005 scrapped.) 144009, 144011, 144013
144	Preserved	8	1986–1987	3	144014, 144016–144019, 144020, 144022–144023
144	Scrapped	2	1986–1987	2	144005, 144012, 144001 (DMSL 55824)
144	Scrapped	2	1986–1987	3	144015, 144021

=== Named units ===
Unit 144001 received the name The Penistone Line Partnership

== Preservation ==
Fourteen Class 144 units have been preserved in operational condition.

=== Operational ===
Unit	Vehicle numbers			Livery	Location	Notes
Unit	DMS	MS	DMSL	Livery	Location	Notes
144003	55803	—	55826	Northern Rail (unbranded)	Great Central Railway (Nottingham)	Delivered on 3 September 2020.
144004	55804	—	55827	Northern Rail (unbranded)	Aln Valley Railway	Delivered on 15 December 2020.
144006	55806	—	55829	Northern Rail (unbranded)	Cambrian Heritage Railway	Delivered on 22 May 2020.
144007	55807	—	55830	Northern Rail (unbranded)	Cambrian Heritage Railway	Delivered on 22 May 2020.
144009	55809	—	55832	Great Midlands Trains (Fictitious)	East Lancashire Railway	Delivered in September 2020 originally for use as a fire service training rig, later purchased for preservation.
144011	55811	—	55834	MetroTrain (red and white)	Keighley and Worth Valley Railway	Acquired on 26 June 2020.
144013	55813	—	55836	Northern Rail (unbranded)	Telford Steam Railway	Delivered on 1–2 July 2020.
144014	55814	55850	55837	Northern Rail (unbranded)	Tyseley Locomotive Works	For main line use.
144016	55816	55852	55839	Northern Rail (unbranded)	Aln Valley Railway	Delivered on 16–17 December 2020.
144017	55817	55853	55840	Northern Rail (unbranded)	Appleby Frodingham Railway	Acquired by Scunthorpe Industrial Heritage Railways in November 2020, in use for driver experience at British Steel Scunthorpe works.
144018	55818	55854	55841	Northern Rail (unbranded)	Mid Norfolk Railway	Delivered to Dereham in late 2020.
144019	55829	55855	55852	Northern Rail (unbranded)	Tyseley Locomotive Works	For mainline use.
144020	55830	55856	55853	Northern Rail (unbranded)	Wensleydale Railway	
144022	55822	55858	55845	Northern Rail (unbranded)	Keith & Dufftown Railway	Delivered on 4 September 2020
144023	55823	55859	55846	Northern Rail (unbranded)	Tyseley Locomotive Works	For mainline use.

=== Non-railway use ===
Five Class 144 units have been acquired by non-railway organisations. Two of them, numbers 144001 and 144008, were distributed to community organisations via the Department for Transport's "Transform a Pacer" competition.

Unit	Vehicle numbers			Livery	Location	Notes
Unit	DMS	MS	DMSL	Livery	Location	Notes
144001	55801	—	—	Northern Rail (unbranded)	Airedale General Hospital	"Transform a Pacer" winner, to be used as a non-clinical space for children's ward patients.
144001	—	—	55824	Grey, with Platform 1 branding	Huddersfield railway station	"Transform a Pacer" winner, to be used by the Platform 1 mental health charity as an educational kitchen.The charity closed down in 2025 and in October of 2026, the vehicle was removed and subsequently scrapped.
144002	55802	—	55825	TEXO Foundation (black and orange)	The Dales School, Blyth	To be used as a classroom and library.
144008	55808	—	—	Northern Rail (unbranded)	Fagley Primary School, Bradford	"Transform a Pacer" winner, to be converted into a science lab to promote STEM learning.
144008	—	—	55831	Northern Rail (unbranded)	Corby and District Model Railway Society	Used as a static exhibit, for special events and birthday parties.
144010	55810	—	55833	Northern Rail (unbranded)	East Lancashire Railway	Purchased by the Greater Manchester Fire and Rescue Service for use as a training rig, being stripped of parts prior to transfer.
