= Platform 1 (charity) =

UK mental health charity

Platform 1 is a mental health charity based in Huddersfield, England. It is situated near Huddersfield railway station.

== History ==
The charity was started in April 2018 by Bob Morse, who has had depression and suicidal thoughts in the past, and Gez Walsh.

In 2020, the charity was announced as one of the winners of the Department for Transport's Transform a Pacer competition. It received a Class 144 unit on 10 July 2021. It plans to convert the former train carriage into a kitchen.

== Work ==
Platform 1 aims to reduce loneliness by providing a meeting space, support, and community. Activities include bicycle repair.
