= Freddy Gwala =

South African musician

- Born: 6 October 1961 (age 64); Soweto, South Africa
- Children: 5

Freddy Gwala is a South African musician born in Soweto, Johannesburg, South Africa. He started his career as a musician in Soweto.

He invented Zumba, a genre of African music, in the early 1970s. He began his music career with his brothers in 1973 after they formed a group called Pure Gold. He also co-founded another group called Platform One. He has also contributed to albums for different artists such as Brenda Fassie and other artists.

In October 2023, Gwala launched his 19th album, Iparole, in Bulawayo, Zimbabwe. During the album launch, he visited Victoria Falls. Some of his popular songs are "Amadamara", "Tshidi S'khelekhele", "Matshidiso" and "Ngiboshiwe".

== Background ==
=== Early life ===
Gwala was born on 6 October 1961 in Soweto, Johannesburg. He is known for having created the "Zumba" genre of African music, which is a fusion of soul music and disco. One of his popular songs in the genre is "Amadamara".

Gwala spent 10 years in prison for stealing cars in the 1980s. He told the Daily Sun that music saved his life and that he does not want to commit crime anymore because prison is hell.

He has created 18 albums since the 1990s, when he released his first album, titled Amadamara.

In 2023, Gwala was deported after arriving at the Joshua Mqabuko Nkomo Airport in Zimbabwean without a work permit. In 2010 again, he was due to perform at Ibumba Festival in Bulawayo but was refused due to not having a work permit.
