= Shipley TCC =

Train Care Centre in West Yorkshire, England

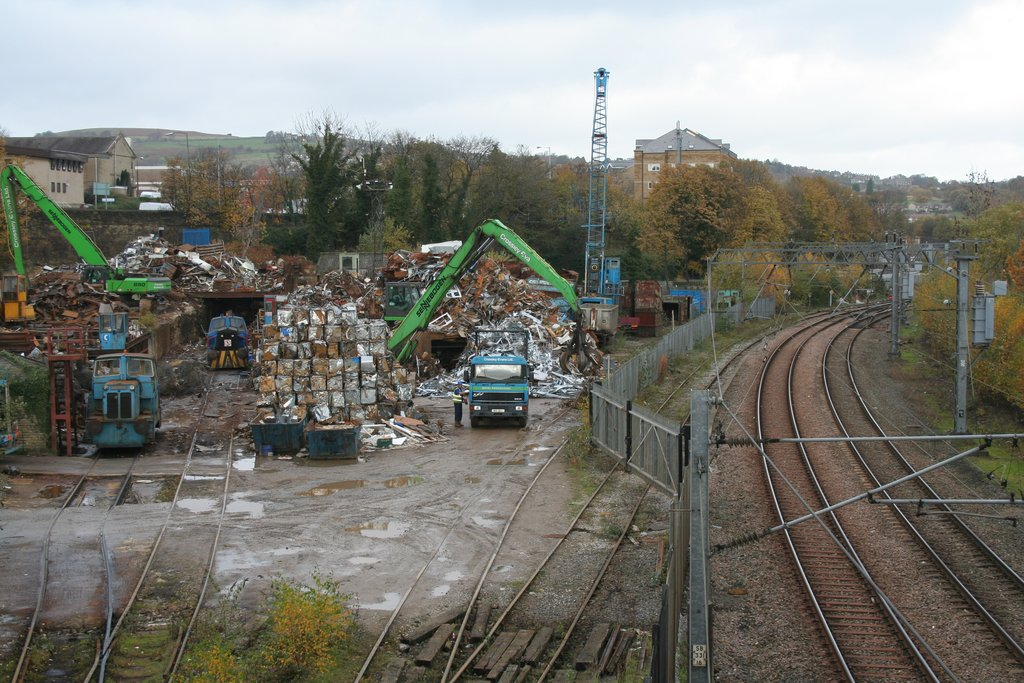
- Interactive map of Shipley TCC

Location
- Location: Shipley, West Yorkshire, England
- Coordinates: 53.8304°N 1.7755°W
- OS grid: SE 148371

Characteristics
- Owner: Network Rail
- Operator: Northern Trains
- Type: EMU

Shipley Traincare Centre (Note: Stylized by Northern and the UK Government as Shipley TrainCare Centre.) is a planned motive power depot in Shipley, West Yorkshire. The facility will be immediately south of Shipley railway station on the west side of the Airedale line branch to Bradford Forster Square on a site bisected by the bridge that carries Valley Road over the railway.

When completed the depot will comprise five sidings for storage of units, north of the Valley Road bridge, with a four-road maintenance shed south of the bridge.

== History ==
The site was originally opened in 1846 as Shipley good yard and stone sidings. From the 1970s onwards, the site was in railway use as a loading point for scrap metal from the Crossley Evans scrapyard which occupied most of the former goods yard, though general goods forwarded and received at the site finished in September 1980. The last scrap train from the site ran in 2016, and Crossley Evans vacated the site in 2023 with clearance work started towards the end of 2023.

The decision to build a depot on the site was prompted by the Transpennine Route Upgrade (TRU), which in the late 2020s, (Note: Projected to be 2026.) will be working on the section of the TRU between Leeds and York. These works will restrict access to the railway depot at Neville Hill east of Leeds, and so Northern developed a contingency plan for storage and maintenance of its electric multiple unit fleet that works the Airedale and Wharfedale railway lines. Even so, when the TRU is complete, the depot at Shipley will remain open to service the EMU fleet. This is partly due to space constraints at Neville Hill; the DMU and EMU shed only has space for seven EMU units at any one time.

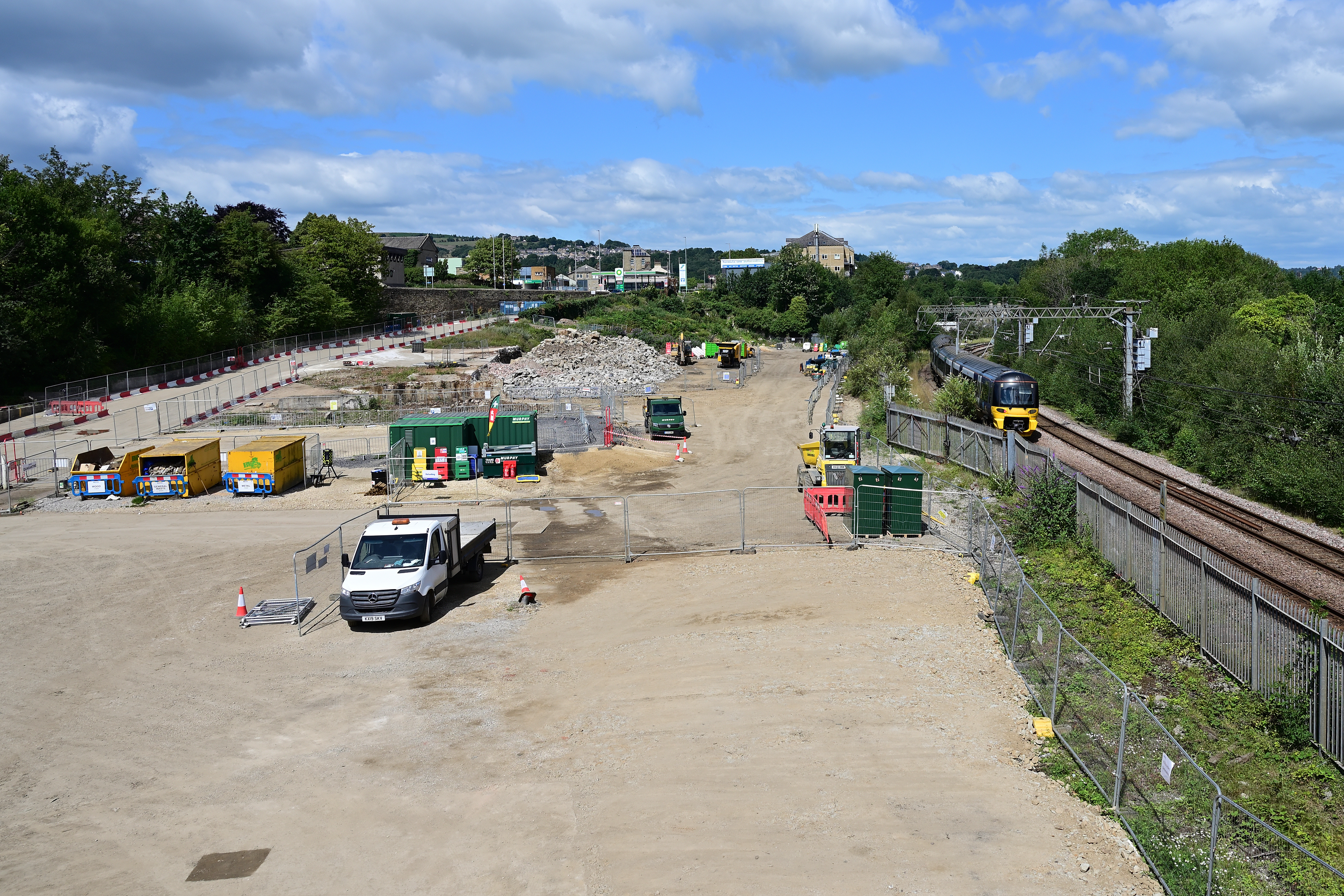
The works on the site in 2025

The plans were confirmed by then rail minister, Huw Merriman, on 14 March 2024, who announced £100 million worth of government funding for the depot. Plans lodged with Bradford Council in October 2023 detailed the site as having a four-road shed, staff facilities, and office, storage space and a site for controlling train movements, with storage space for 40 trains. The headshunt to the south of the site will be capable of handling eight-carriage trains. Cleaning of the interior and exterior of railway vehicles is envisaged (including a carriage wash section), and the site will have the ability to deal with controlled emission toilets (CET). The main building is projected to be 148.5 metres (487 ft) long, by 41.9 metres (137 ft) wide.

The depot will be operated by Northern Trains and will be used for the storage and maintenance of the operator's EMU stock, currently allocated to Neville Hill TMD. Class 331 and Class 333 EMUs will be serviced at the depot, and these provide the services on the Airedale and Wharfedale lines. Additionally, the site may take on the role of refuelling the Class 158 diesel multiple units used on the Leeds-Morecambe and Settle and Carlisle Lines.
