= British Rail Class 331 =

British electric multiple-unit (EMU) train built by CAF

British Rail Class 331 Civity
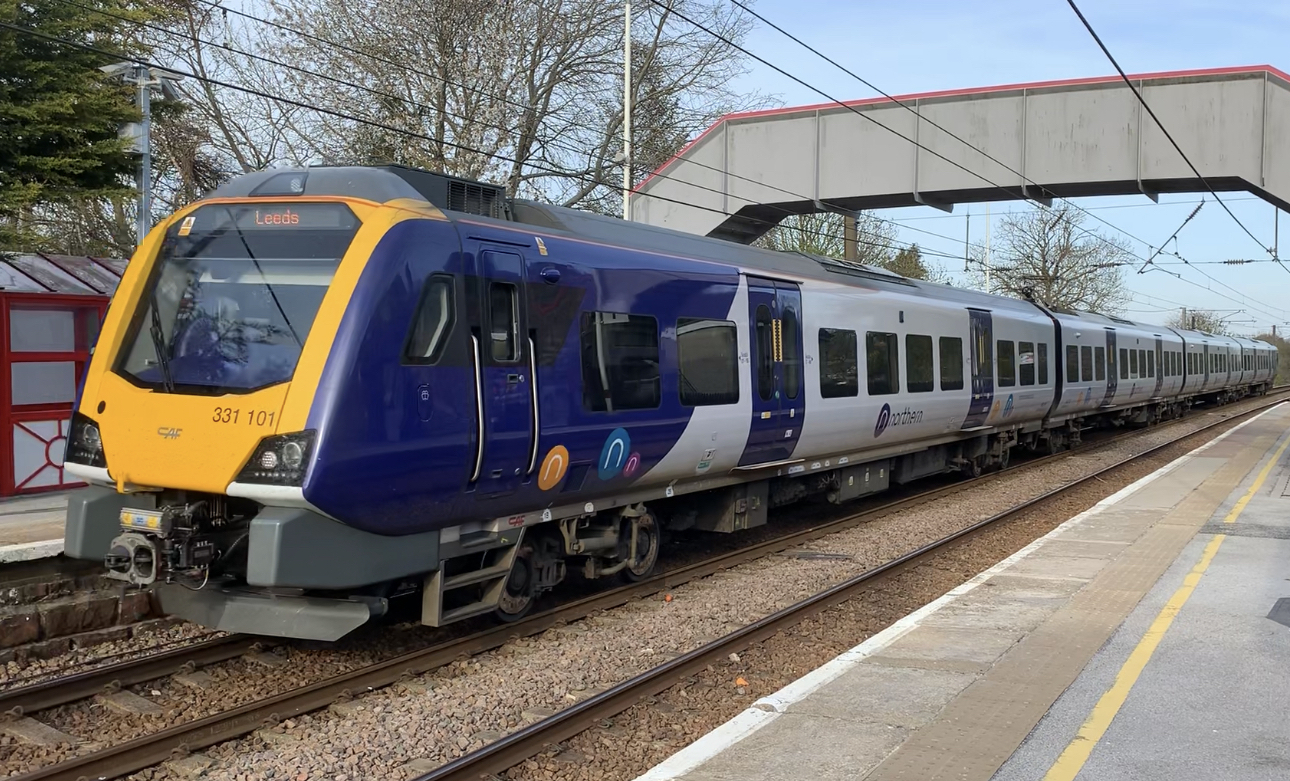
- Class 331 at Ben Rhydding in April 2020

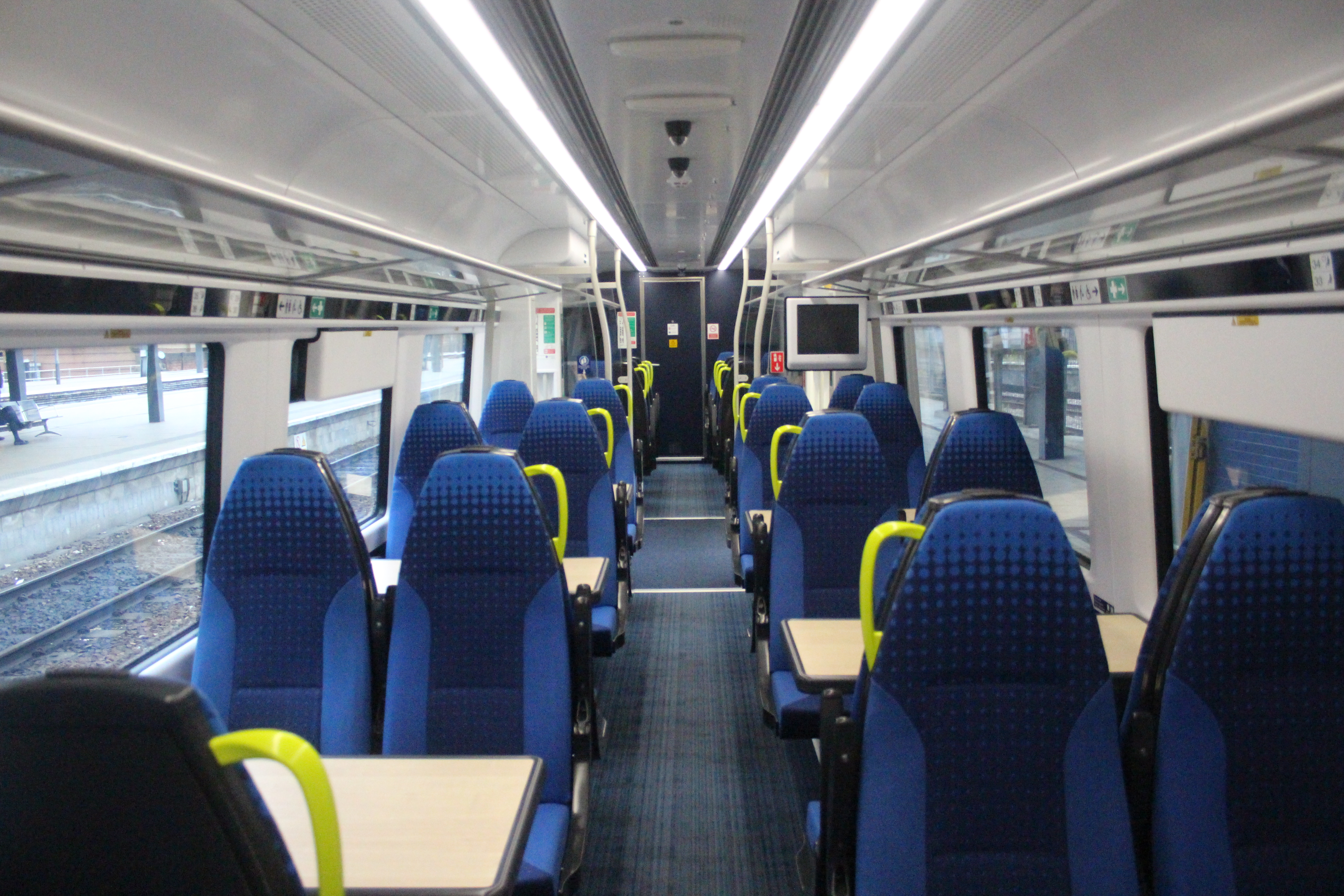
- Interior
- In service: 1 July 2019 – present
- Manufacturer: CAF
- Built at: Zaragoza, Spain; Newport, Wales (1 unit only)
- Family name: Civity
- Replaced: Class 319; Class 321; Class 322
- Constructed: 2017–2020
- Entered service: 2019–2020
- Number built: 43; (31 × 331/0, 12 × 331/1)
- Formation: 3 cars per 331/0 unit: DMSL-PTS-DMS; 4 cars per 331/1 unit: DMSL-PTS-TS-DMS
- Fleet numbers: 331/0: 331001–331031; 331/1: 331101–331112
- Capacity: 331/0: 184 seats (plus 19 tip-up); 331/1: 260 seats (plus 23 tip-up)
- Owner: Eversholt Rail Group
- Operator: Northern Trains
- Depots: Neville Hill (Leeds); Allerton (Liverpool); Shipley (future)

Specifications
- Car body construction: Aluminium
- Train length: 331/0: 71.40 m (234 ft 3 in); 331/1: 94.75 m (310 ft 10 in)
- Car length: DM vehs.: 24.026 m (78 ft 9.9 in); Trailers: 23.350 m (76 ft 7.3 in)
- Width: 2.712 m (8 ft 11 in)
- Height: 3.870 m (12 ft 8 in)
- Doors: Double-leaf sliding plug; (2 per side per car)
- Wheel diameter: 780–710 mm (31–28 in) (new-worn)
- Wheelbase: Bogies: 2.250 m (7 ft 5 in); Over bogie centres: 16.000 m (52 ft 6 in)
- Maximum speed: 100 mph (161 km/h)
- Axle load: DMSL: 11.30 t (11.12 long tons); PTS: 8.88 t (8.74 long tons); TS: 7.97 t (7.84 long tons); DMS: 11.21 t (11.03 long tons); (tare)
- Traction system: CAF Power IGBT–VVVF
- Traction motors: 8 × TSA TME 52-15-4 asynchronous three-phase AC (4 per DM vehicle)
- Power output: 1,760 kW (2,360 hp); (220 kW (300 hp) per motor)
- Gear ratio: 4.707 : 1 (2-stage reduction)
- Acceleration: 1.3 m/s^{2} (2.9 mph/s) max.
- Electric system: 25 kV 50 Hz AC overhead
- Current collection: Pantograph (Brecknell Willis)
- UIC classification: 331/0: Bo′Bo′+2′2′+Bo′Bo′; 331/1: Bo′Bo′+2′2′+2′2′+Bo′Bo′
- Braking systems: Electro-pneumatic (disc) and regenerative; (Knorr-Bremse EP2002)
- Safety systems: AWS; TPWS; (plus provision for ETCS)
- Coupling system: Dellner
- Multiple working: Within class
- Track gauge: 1,435 mm (4 ft 8 1/2 in) standard gauge

Notes/references
- Sourced from unless otherwise noted.

The British Rail Class 331 Civity is a class of electric multiple unit built by CAF, owned by Eversholt Rail Group, and currently operated by Northern Trains. A total of 43 units have been built – 31 three-car units and 12 four-car units. Construction of the trains started in July 2017 and they were phased into service from 1 July 2019.

== History ==
The announcement of the new trains was made by Arriva UK Trains when it was confirmed that it would become the next operator of the Northern franchise from 1 April 2016. CAF were selected by Arriva as they were the only manufacturer able to produce both new diesel (Class 195) and electric multiple units from the same platform, the Civity, thus increasing familiarity for drivers and reducing maintenance costs once in operation. Bombardier submitted a bid to produce electric units based on their new Aventra platform, but was unable to offer the matching DMU that Arriva required. Furthermore, Bombardier already had a long order book for Aventra units and Arriva believed CAF were in a stronger position to guarantee on-time delivery of the units. At the time of placing the order, the £500 million value and 101-unit size made it CAF's largest-ever contract for a European customer.

Construction started in July 2017, with the first completed unit being unveiled on 31 January 2018. Testing began in the UK in September 2018, and in March 2019, a four-car Class 331 unit (331111) became the first train to be completed at CAF's Llanwern factory.

On 28 June 2019, the new trains were launched by a special service for the media. Regular passenger service with the Class 331 (along with its diesel counterpart, the Class 195) started on 1 July 2019.

During the first episode of the seventh series of Great Continental Railway Journeys, first shown in 2020, Michael Portillo drove unit 331005 inside the CAF factory in Zaragoza.

== Description ==
Arriva UK Trains stated its aim for a "step-change in quality" for the new trains when compared with older trains in the Northern fleet such as the Pacers and Sprinters. The interior, layout and driver cab of the Class 331 (EMU) are identical to their sister units, the Class 195 (DMU) with the only difference being power generation and drivetrain.

The 331s have a 'doors-at-thirds' arrangement, and a top speed limited to 100 mph (161 km/h). The units have air conditioning, power sockets, one toilet per train, open gangways between individual carriages, passenger compartment CCTV, provision for wheelchair passengers and wi-fi system. All trains fitted with an automated audio information system, as well as display screens – six in each carriage ensuring all passengers have an unobstructed view to at least one. These screens convey a variety of information from station arrival times and informing alighting passengers when they need to be in a different carriage due to platforms being too short to accommodate the train.

Northern selected a "wide and spacious" vestibule area to allow for quicker passenger flows when boarding and disembarking to minimise dwell times which can result in delays.

The Class 331 electric units are noted for their quick acceleration putting them among the fastest accelerating EMUs in the United Kingdom with a rate of 1.3 m/s^{2} (2.9 mph/s). This allows the units to accelerate from 0 to 125 km/h (78 mph) in 45 seconds - by comparison, the ex-British Rail Class 321/322 units have an acceleration rate of 0.55 m/s^{2} (1.2 mph/s) and which takes them over 2 minutes to attain the same speed.

The units are designed with a projected lifespan of 35 years and it is planned they will operate beyond 2050 with maintenance and refurbishment.

== Routes ==
In West Yorkshire, the Class 331 units replaced the eight Class 321 and Class 322 trains operating alongside the fleet of Class 333 units on Leeds/Bradford Forster Square to Ilkley/Skipton and Leeds to Doncaster stopping services. In the North West, the 331s were deployed on inter-city electrified services from Blackpool North to Manchester Airport and services from Hazel Grove to Blackpool North. The 331s were also introduced on the Liverpool Lime Street to Blackpool North route and the Liverpool Lime Street to Manchester Airport route.

== Fleet details ==
=== Illustration ===
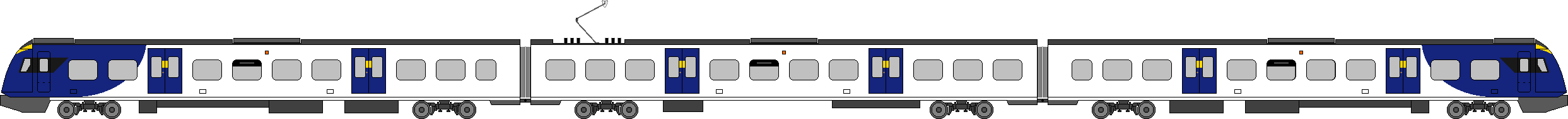
Northern Class 331/0

=== Named units ===
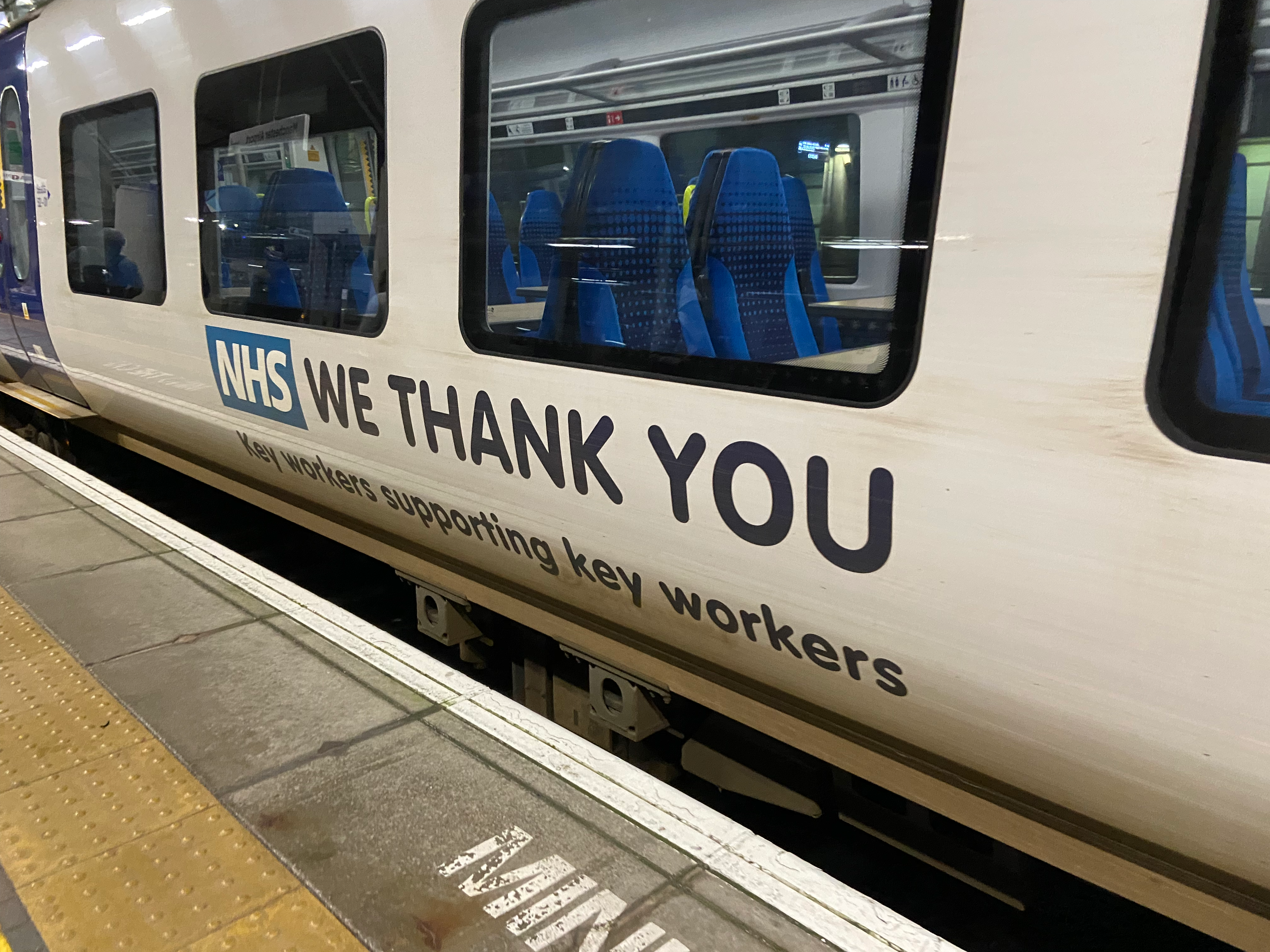
Class 331 unit with "NHS We Thank You" livery

Both 331106 and 331110 are named Proud To Be Northern.

Units 331010 and 331109 also have a special NHS livery to thank them for their efforts during the Covid-19 pandemic.

Unit 331004 is named The Bradfordian to celebrate Bradford's UK City of Culture status in 2025.

== See also ==
- British Rail Class 195 - A diesel multiple unit variant of the CAF Civity UK platform also built for Northern
- British Rail Class 196 - A diesel multiple unit variant of the CAF Civity UK platform built for West Midlands Trains
- British Rail Class 197 - A diesel multiple unit variant of the CAF Civity UK platform built for Transport for Wales Rail
- British Rail Class 397 - An electric multiple unit variant of the CAF Civity UK platform built for TransPennine Express
- British Rail Class 897 - A tri-mode multiple unit variant of the CAF Civity UK platform to be built for London North Eastern Railway
