= British Rail Class 382 =

British electric multiple unit train

- Replaced: Class 333 (Planned)
- Number built: 62; (46 × 3-car sets 16 × 4-car sets); (Planned as of September 2025)
- Fleet numbers: TBA
- Capacity: 3-car sets 191 seats; 4-car sets 265 seats; (Planned as of September 2025)
- Operator: Northern Trains

Specifications
- Train length: 3 cars 69 m (226 ft 5 in); 4 cars 92 m (301 ft 10 in); (Planned as of September 2025)
- Maximum speed: 100 mph (160 km/h) (Planned as of September 2025)
- Axle load: Route Availability 3 (Planned as of 2025)
- Electric system: 25 kV 50 Hz AC overhead
- Current collection: Pantograph
- Safety systems: AWS; TPWS
- Track gauge: 1,435 mm (4 ft 8 1/2 in) standard gauge

The British Rail Class 382 is a planned fleet of three- and four-car electric multiple unit (EMU) trains to be built for Northern Trains.

== History ==
In August 2023, Northern Trains issued a tender to acquire a contract for up to 450 new trains to replace the older rolling stock in their fleet. A more detailed tender for up to 329 new trains was issued in 2024, and in January 2025, it was revealed that Northern Trains had shortlisted five companies to build its new fleet – Alstom, CAF, Hitachi, Siemens and Stadler.

Contracts are expected to be awarded in 2026, with the first units delivered by 2030.

In September 2025, Modern Railways reported that the TOPS number 382 is reserved for the planned new EMU fleet.
