= British Rail Class 333 =

Class of British electric multiple unit

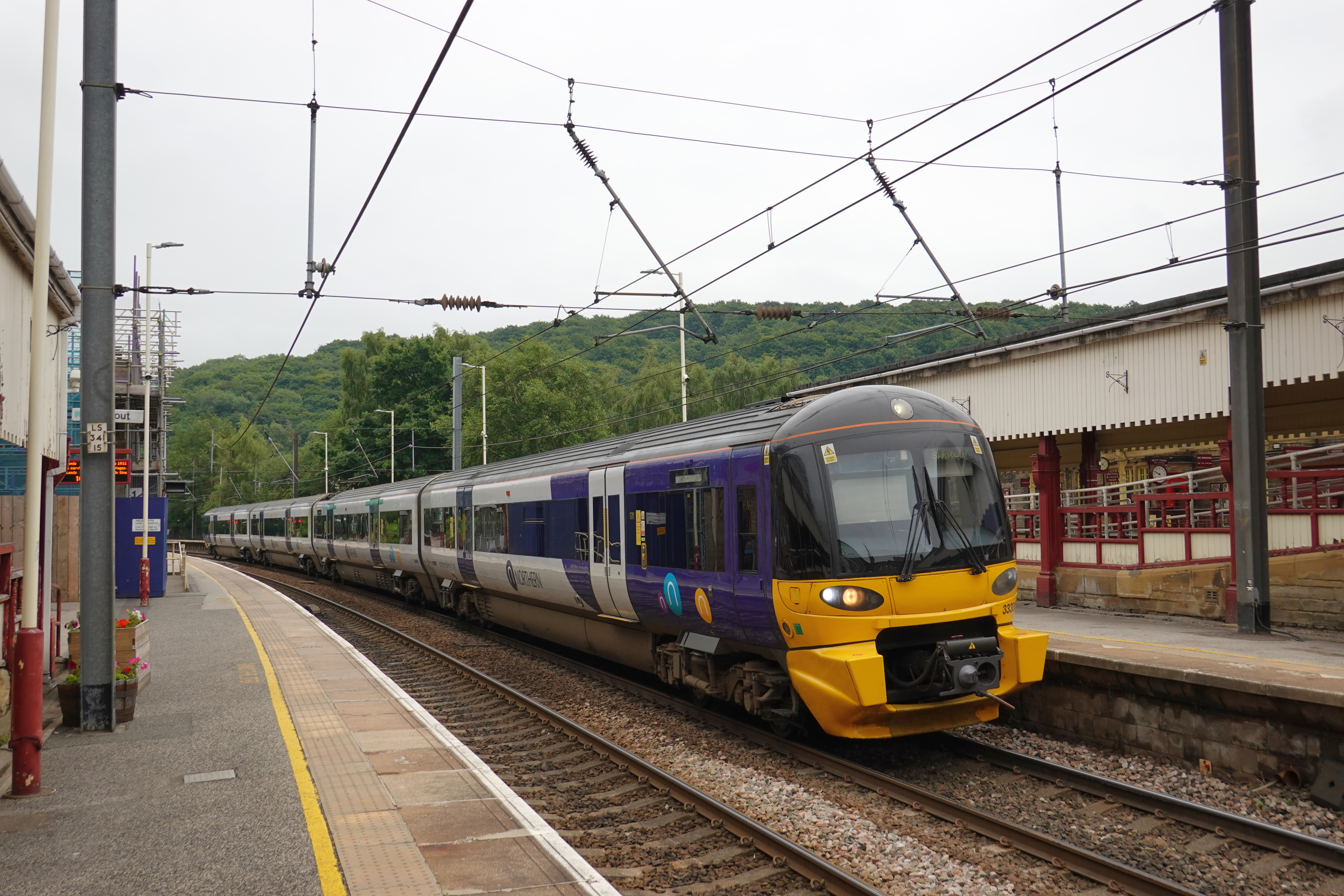
- Class 333 at Keighley in 2023

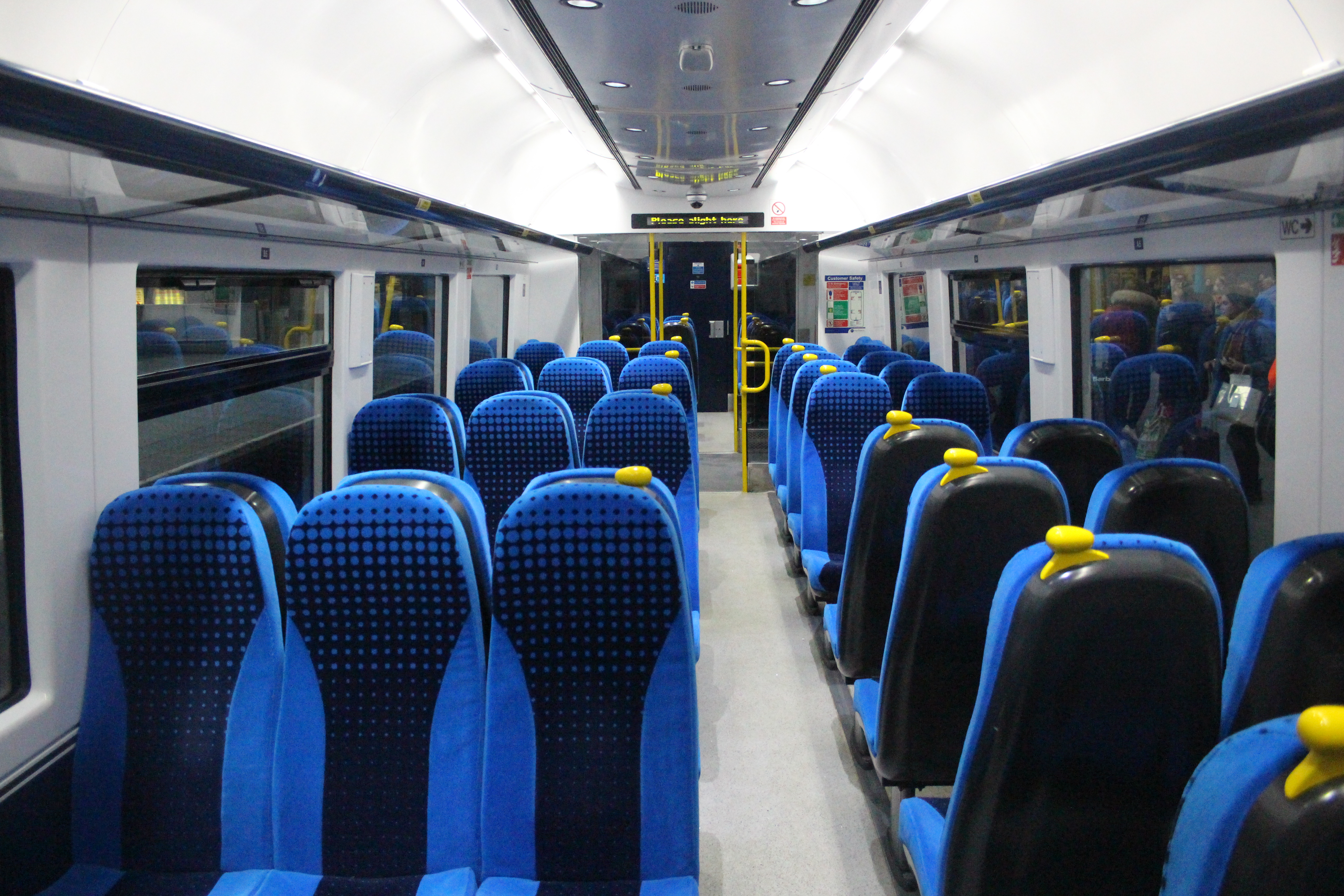
- Interior of a refurbished unit
- Stock type: Electric multiple unit
- In service: 12 January 2001 – present
- Manufacturer: CAF
- Built at: Zaragoza, Spain
- Replaced: Class 308
- Constructed: 2000–2003
- Refurbished: 2018–2020
- Number built: 16
- Number in service: 16
- Successor: Class 382 (Planned)
- Formation: 4 cars per unit: DMSO-PTSO-TSO-DMSO
- Fleet numbers: 333001–333016
- Capacity: When 3-car units: 260 seats; As 4-car units: 360 seats
- Owner: Angel Trains
- Operators: Current: Northern Trains; Former: Arriva Rail North; Arriva Trains Northern; Northern Rail
- Depots: Neville Hill (Leeds); Shipley (future)
- Lines served: Airedale; Wharfedale

Specifications
- Car body construction: Steel
- Train length: 94.18 m (309 ft 0 in) (Note: Over couplers.)
- Car length: DMSO: 23.74 m (77 ft 11 in); Trailers: 23.35 m (76 ft 7 in)
- Width: 2.75 metres (9 ft 0 in)
- Maximum speed: 100 mph (160 km/h)
- Weight: DMSO A: 50.6 t (49.8 long tons; 55.8 short tons); PTSO: 46 t (45 long tons; 51 short tons); TSO: 38.5 t (37.9 long tons; 42.4 short tons); DMSO B: 50 t (49 long tons; 55 short tons)
- Traction system: Siemens E500 D600/860 M5 rdq-1 IGBT–C/I
- Traction motors: 8 × Siemens 1TB2218-0JA03 175 kW (235 hp) asychronous 3-phase AC
- Power output: 1,400 kW (1,900 hp)
- Gearbox: ZF-Hurth
- Acceleration: 0.9 m/s^{2} (2.0 mph/s)
- Electric system: 25 kV 50 Hz AC overhead
- Current collection: Pantograph (Brecknell Willis)
- UIC classification: Bo′Bo′+2′2′+2′2′+Bo′Bo′
- Braking system: Regenerative Disc (Westinghouse)
- Safety systems: AWS; TPWS
- Coupling system: Dellner 10 (Scharfenberg)
- Multiple working: Within class
- Track gauge: 1,435 mm (4 ft 8 1/2 in) standard gauge

Notes/references
- Sourced from except where noted

The British Rail Class 333 is a class of electric multiple unit (EMU) passenger train built by CAF between 2000 and 2003 for Northern Spirit (later Arriva Trains Northern), with traction equipment supplied by Siemens Transportation Systems. All have passed to subsequent franchises and subsequent operators Northern Rail, Arriva Rail North and Northern Trains.

== History ==
In March 1998, Angel Trains ordered 16 three-carriage sets from Siemens Transportation Systems for Northern Spirit to replace the slam-door Class 308s on the Airedale and Wharfedale lines from Leeds to Bradford Forster Square, Ilkley and Skipton. Construction of the trains was sub-contracted to CAF with Siemens Transportation Systems providing the traction equipment.

The first was delivered to Neville Hill TMD in March 2000. The first entered service on 12 January 2001.

In April 2000, a further eight trailer carriages were ordered with funding from West Yorkshire Passenger Transport Executive and inserted into the first eight sets in 2002. Subsequently a further order was placed with funding from the Strategic Rail Authority to increase the remaining sets to four carriages. These were delivered in 2003.

However, the funding for the fourth carriages in the latter eight sets expired in 2007 and as a consequence of this they could have been removed. Had this happened the four-car Class 321s would have been removed from Leeds to Doncaster services. As a result, the fourth cars were funded by the South Yorkshire Passenger Transport Executive, despite not running in South Yorkshire, to ensure that four-car units are available on Doncaster services.

In 2008, all were repainted into a new livery by Wabtec at Doncaster Works that incorporated West Yorkshire Metro branding.

When Arriva Rail North was awarded the Northern franchise in December 2015 plans were announced for the replacement of Class 333 units with a new fleet of 3-car trains, though ultimately this did not occur.

Between December 2018 and April 2020, all were refurbished by Chrysalis Rail, Holbeck and repainted into Arriva Rail North and later Northern Trains livery.

In 2022, the 333s started receiving digital upgrades, and these upgrades include added USB power plugs and Digital display screens among other upgrades.

== Performance ==
The units are capable of 100 mph (160 km/h), but the maximum speed on their routes is 90 mph (140 km/h). They have standard class only 2+3 high-density seating, and each set has one toilet.

== Fleet details ==
Class	Operator	No. built	Year built	Cars per unit	Unit nos.
Class 333	Northern Trains	16	2000–2003	4	333001–333016

== Named units ==
Two units have previously carried names:

- 333007 Alderman J Arthur Godwin, First Lord Mayor of Bradford 1907 (De-named)
- 333011 Olicana, Ilkley's Roman Fort (De-named)

== Gallery ==
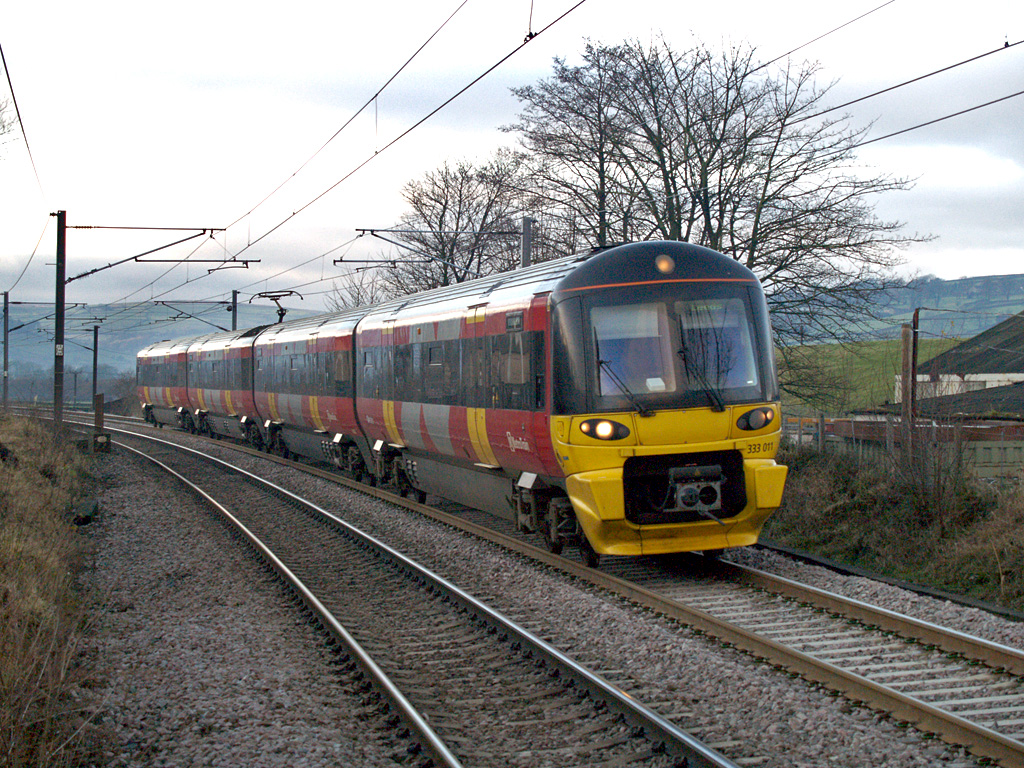
Class 333 in the original Northern Spirit livery

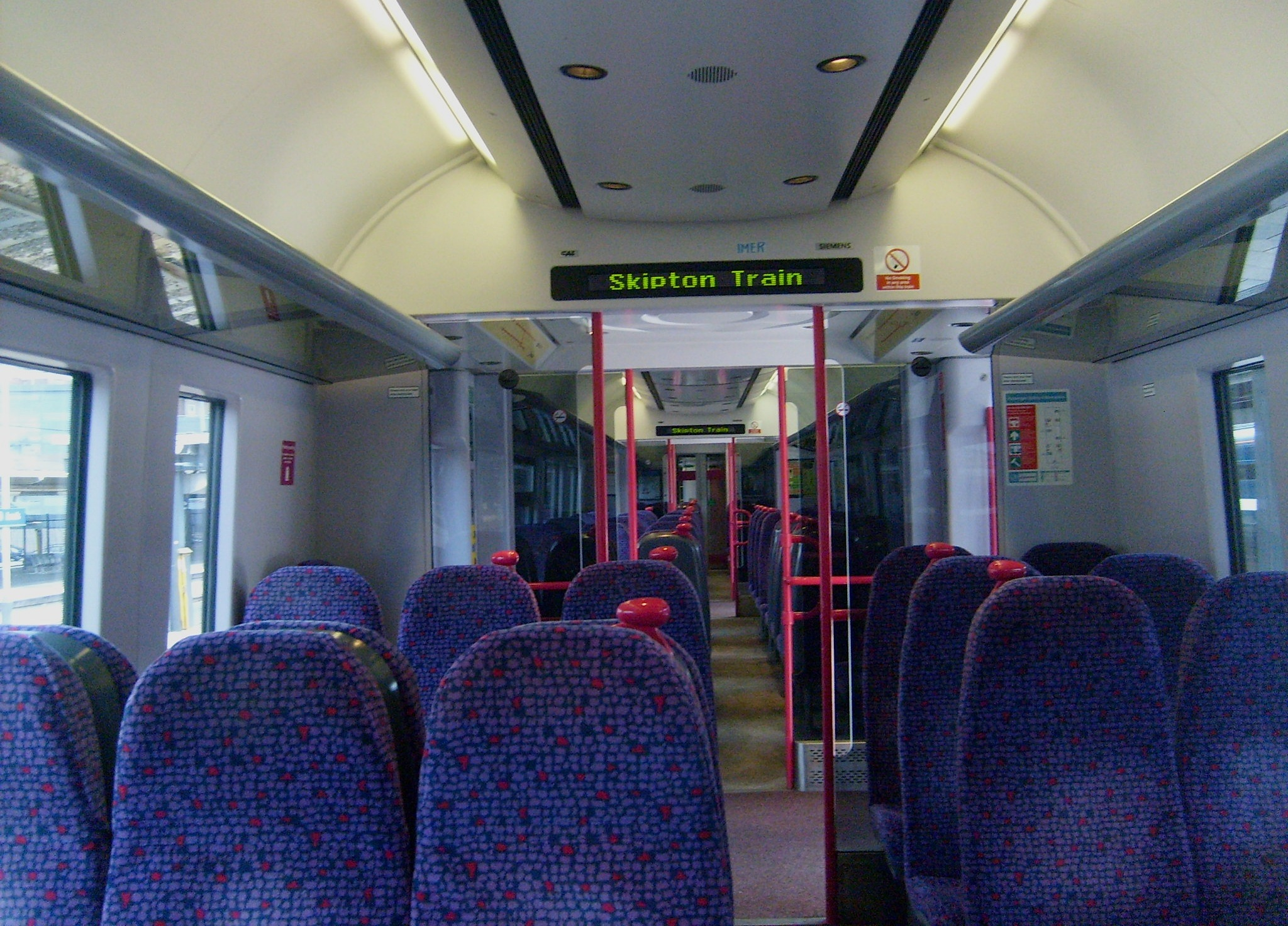
The original interior of a Class 333

== See also ==
- British Rail Class 332, similar units operated by Heathrow Express until 28 December 2020
