= Platform One (band) =

South African music group

- Origin: Soweto
- Genres: Afro pop
- Years active: 1992–Present
- Labels: Gallo Records
- Members: Nani Ntengo; Sonto Dladla

Platform One is a South African music group that started in early 1992 at Pimville Square in Soweto. The group is composed of Nani Tengo, the lead vocalist, Sonto Dladla. The group is known for their popular songs such as Taste and Pass, Womnyakazisa, Thuli, Esibayeni and Makoti, among others. The band's debut song, Isencane, remains popular at weddings in South Africa, Zimbabwe, Eswatini and Botswana.

== Background ==
=== 1992: Formation ===
In 1992, Nani Tengo, Sonto Dladla and Neli Gwala, who at the time were teenagers, started dancing in the streets which led recognition by audience. Later that same year, they formed a group called Platform One.

== Group members ==
The group had more members before some began showing interest to other careers.

=== Sonto Dladla ===
Dladla is one of the group's main vocalists. She was born and raised in Soweto, South Africa. She attended both her primary and secondary school in Soweto. As one of the founding members of the group, along with Nani Tengo and Neli Gwala, she is known for her powerful and soulful voice. She provides backing vocals and harmonies to support the lead vocalists. As dancer and choreographer, her energetic and captivating dance moves are an integral part of the group's performances. She also contributes to the group's songwriting process. As a duty of the founding member of the group, Dladla has taken on a mentorship role, guiding and supporting newer members. She also has a significant impact on the group's creative direction, helping to shape their sound, style, and overall aesthetic.

=== Zamani Khumalo ===
Zamani Khumalo who is the lead vocalist and songwriter. He leads the group's vocals, delivers solo performances, and represents the group as the main frontman, including composing music and writing lyrics for the group's songs, arranging vocals and harmonies for the group's performances, leading rehearsals and directing the group's musical direction, collaborating with other members to develop new ideas and concepts for songs and performances, representing the group in interviews, and public appearances, as well as media events, mentoring and guiding other members to help them develop their skills and talents, and contributing to the group's overall creative vision and strategy.

As the songwriter, Khumalo draws inspiration from his personal experiences, social issues, and cultural heritage to craft meaningful and impactful songs that resonate with the group's audience.

=== Sipho Mthembu ===
As the vocalist and music director of the group, Mthembu, produces music for the group, overseeing the technical aspects of their performances, and ensuring that the group's sound is polished and professional. Mthembu also provides vocal coaching and guidance to the band members, helping them to develop their vocal skills and performance techniques.

Mthembu leads the group's rehearsals and warm-ups and ensures that everyone is prepared and focused for performances. He represents the group in industry events and conferences, and networks with other professionals in the music industry. Mthembu also mentors and guides younger members of the group, sharing his experience and knowledge to help them grow and develop as artists.

=== Sibusiso Dlamini (keyboardist) ===
Dlamini as the group's vocalist and keyboardist, plays the piano and synthesizers during performances, adding depth and texture to the group's sound. He also provides backing vocals and harmonies, supporting the lead vocalists and enhancing the group's vocal sound, assisting with songwriting and arrangement. Dlamini also represents the group in media interviews and public appearances, sharing his perspective and insights as a member of the group.

=== Mthokozisi Masango ===
Masango is the vocalist and choreographer who creates and teaches dance routines for the group's performances, blending traditional and contemporary styles to enhance the visual appeal.

Masango also assists with costume design and styling, ensuring that the group's visual aesthetic is cohesive and professional.

== See also ==
- Freddy Gwala
