= Neville Hill TMD =

Train Maintenance Depot in West Yorkshire, England

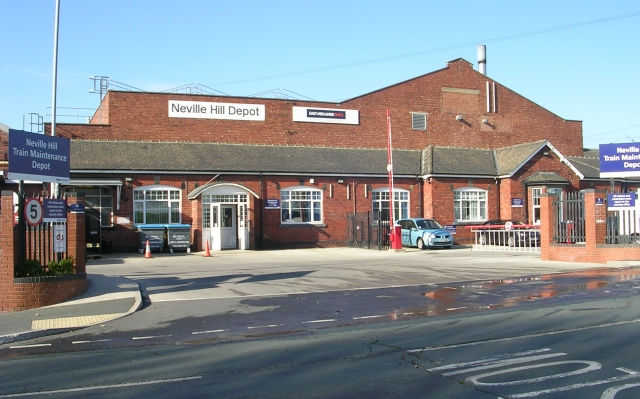
- Neville Hill depot
- Interactive map of Neville Hill TMD

Location
- Location: Leeds, England
- Coordinates: 53.7923°N 1.5051°W
- OS grid: SE325330

Characteristics
- Owner: Network Rail
- Operator: Northern Trains
- Depot code: 50B (1948–1960); 55H (1960–1973); NL (1973–present)
- Type: Diesel, HST, DMU, EMU

History
- Opened: 1904
- Original: North Eastern Railway
- Post-grouping: LNER

Neville Hill is a railway train maintenance depot in Osmondthorpe, Leeds, England on the Leeds to Selby Line. The depot is situated 2 miles 14 chains (3.5 km) to the east of Leeds railway station on the north side of the line.

The TOPS depot code is NL.

== History ==
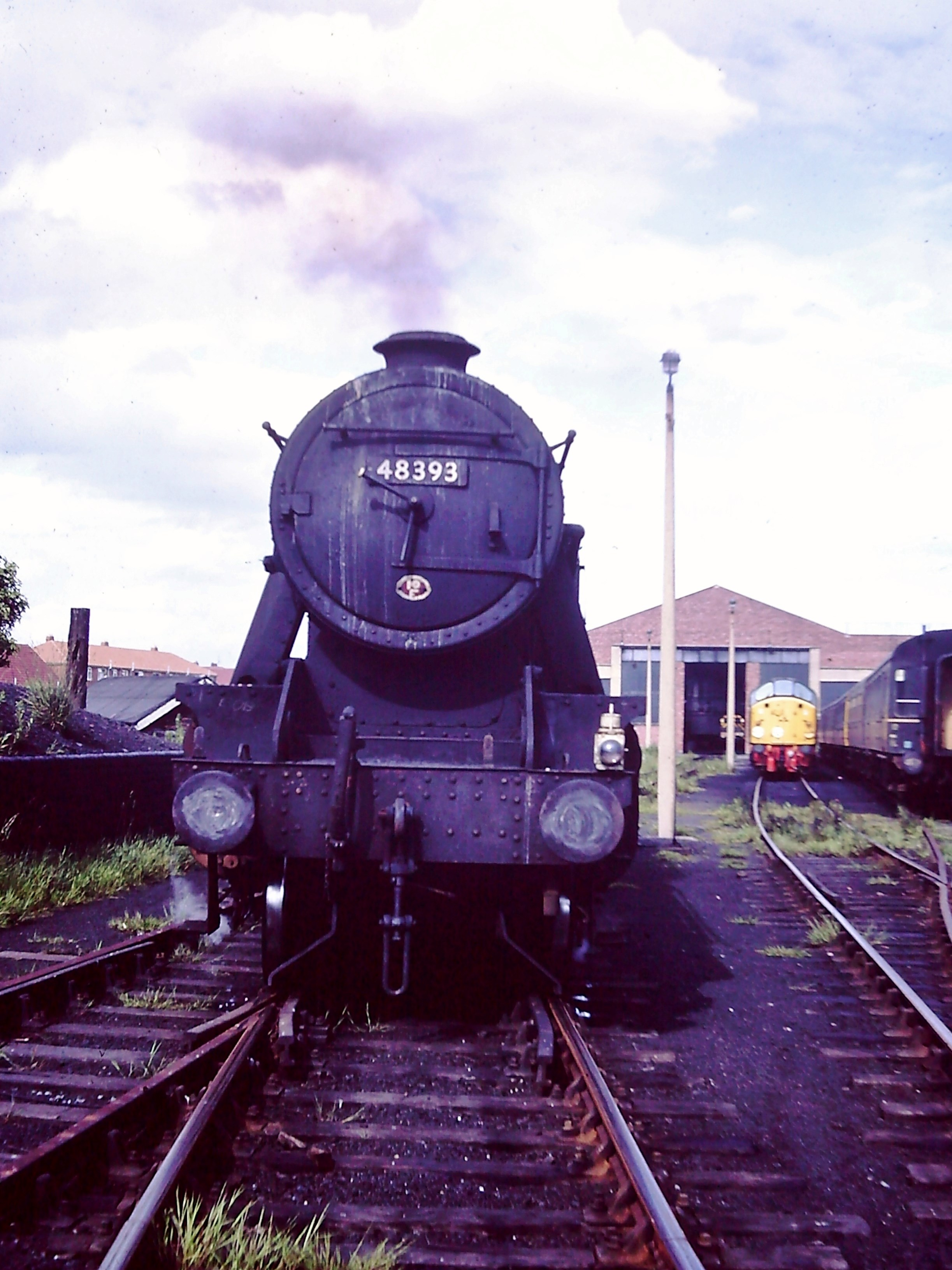
48343 Neville Hill 22 June 1968

In 1899 the locomotive shed at Holbeck was found not to have sufficient capacity for the number of locomotives using it, so an additional depot was constructed at Neville Hill by the North Eastern Railway at a cost of £132,971, with the facility being extended in 1904.

Sometime during the 1950s the four-roundhouse shed was reduced by half and given a new frontage.

A DMU shed is believed to have been added in 1958 along with servicing facilities for diesels although main line locomotives such as Class 45s were still being stabled outside the old brick-built steam shed in 1961. D2000 series 0-6-0 diesel shunters were the first diesel locos allocated to Neville Hill, probably about that time; the quartet in 1961 comprised D2242-4/6.

At the formation of British Railways in 1948 the depot code was 50B, under York (50A). In 1959 it was transferred to the Leeds District under Holbeck (55A) and re-coded 55H. After 1973 the depot code became NL.

A completely new set of buildings were opened in 1969 to cater for diesel locomotives, DMUs, and coaching stock. This included a new carriage cleaning plant, an 800 foot (244 m) inspection pit and a repair shed. At this time the main use of the depot was for DMUs and carriages, but by 1980 Neville Hill was maintaining HSTs and Class 08 shunters. The allocation at this time reflected the changes going on in British Rail with a move from loco-hauled coaching stock to fixed formation HSTs, so that the allocation of locomotives in 1977 was just 4 Class 08 shunters while the larger locomotives were located on the south side of Leeds at Holbeck shed, but by 1985 all nine of the shunters for the Leeds area were allocated to Neville Hill along with 55 HST power cars.

In 1987, the depot had an allocation of Class 08 shunters. Classes 101, 108, 110, 111, 141, 142, 144 and 150 DMUs and High Speed Trains were also allocated.

The line from Leeds City station to Neville Hill depot was electrified in the early 1990s as a corollary to the East Coast Main Line electrification project. The electrification was energised in March 1993.

On the evening of 13 November 2019, an empty LNER Class 800 collided with the rear of an empty LNER InterCity 125 set. No one was injured but significant damage was done to the 800 and the rear Class 43 power car.

=== Current ===
The depot is owned by Network Rail but operated by Northern Trains for light and heavy maintenance, and train storage. CrossCountry and London North Eastern Railway also use the site for train storage. The site employs over 400 people (2009).

==== Rolling stock in the modern era ====
Northern Trains have Class 150, Class 155, Class 158, Class 170, Class 331 and Class 333s allocated to Neville Hill. Due to the forthcoming Transpennine Route Upgrade (TRU), access will be limited to the depot from Leeds railway station during the late 2020s. During this time, the EMU fleet will be transferred to the new depot at Shipley.

In 2012 East Midlands Trains' facility at Neville Hill was used for the Project Miller restoration of a prototype Class 41) number 41001 to working condition. East Midlands Railway and its predecessors maintained High Speed Trains at the depot until they were withdrawn in May 2021.

In December 2020, LNER transferred its remaining InterCity 225 sets from Bounds Green TMD.
