= Heaton TMD =

Railway maintenance depot in Newcastle-upon-Tyne, England

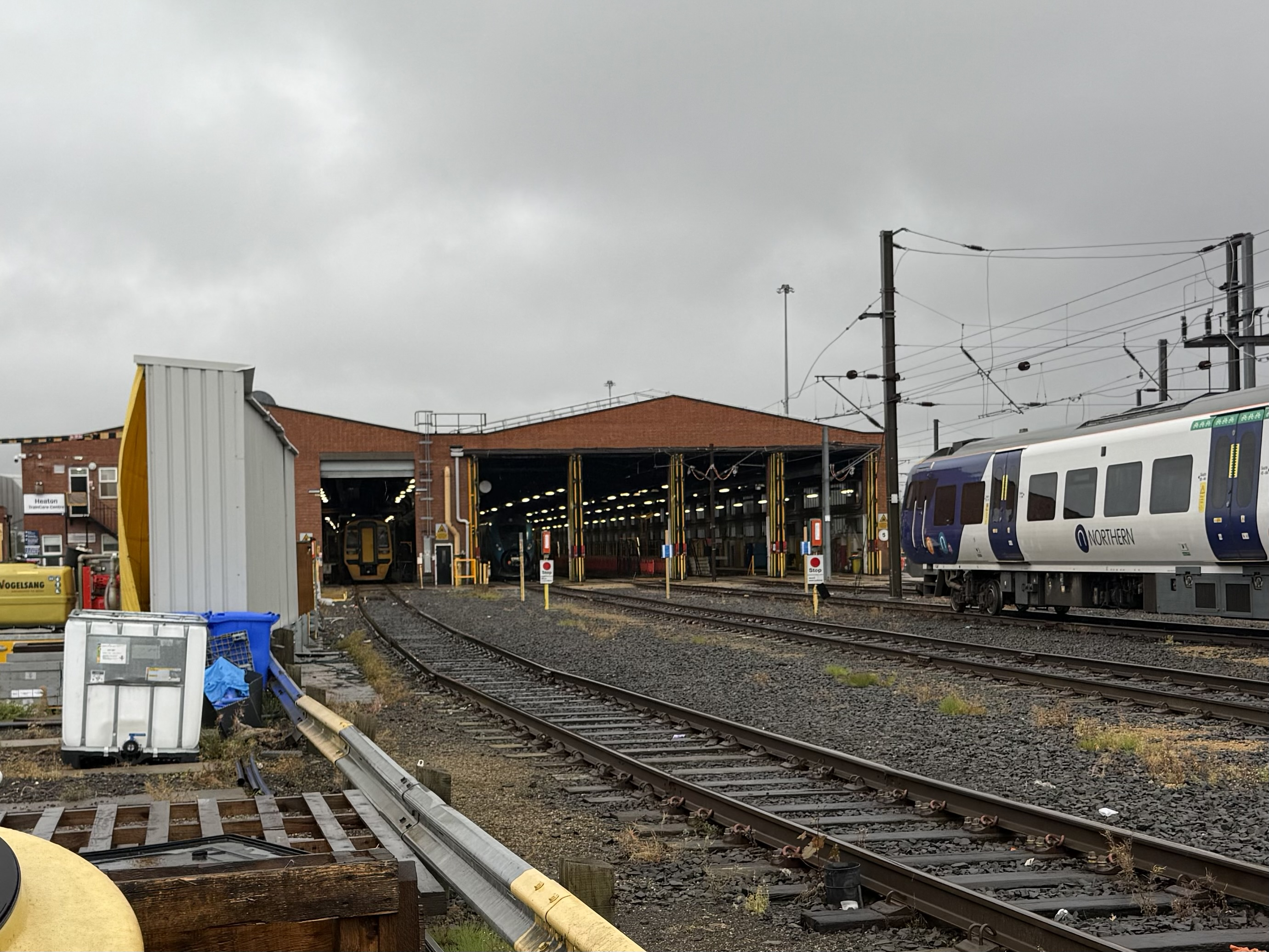
- Heaton Depot, September 2025.
- Interactive map of Heaton TMD

Location
- Location: Newcastle upon Tyne, England
- Coordinates: 54.987°N 1.565°W
- OS grid: NZ278659

Characteristics
- Owner: Northern
- Depot code: 52B (1948-1967); HT (1973-present)
- Type: Electric, HST, DMU

History
- Original: North Eastern Railway
- Pre-grouping: North Eastern Railway
- Post-grouping: LNER

Heaton TMD is a railway traction maintenance depot situated in the Heaton area of Newcastle upon Tyne, England, it is located next to the East Coast Main Line, around 2 miles (3 km) east of Newcastle Central station. Heaton was a sub-shed of Gateshead between 1963 and 1967.

== History ==
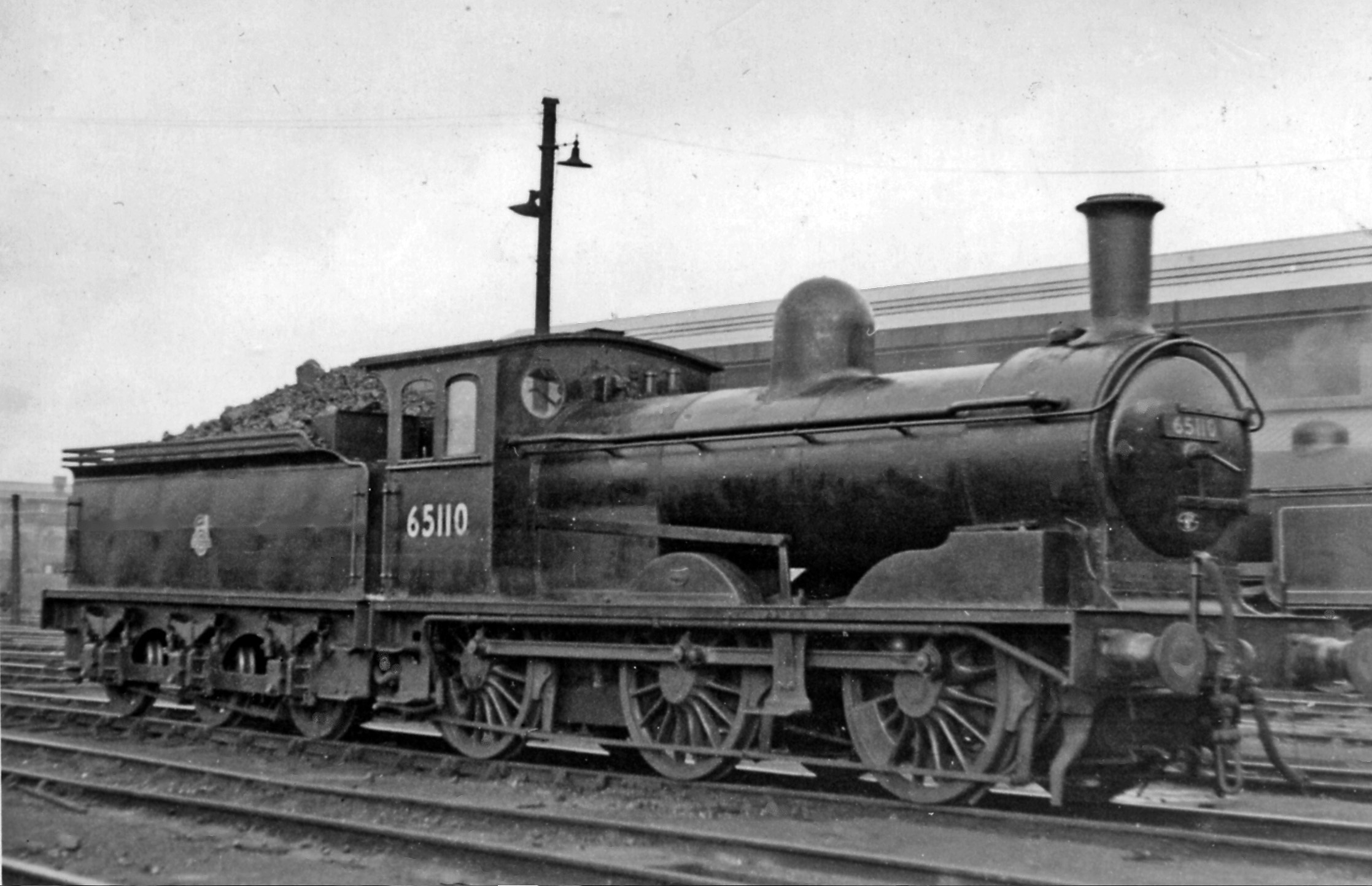
NER Class J21 No.65110 in ex-works condition at Heaton Shed, 1954

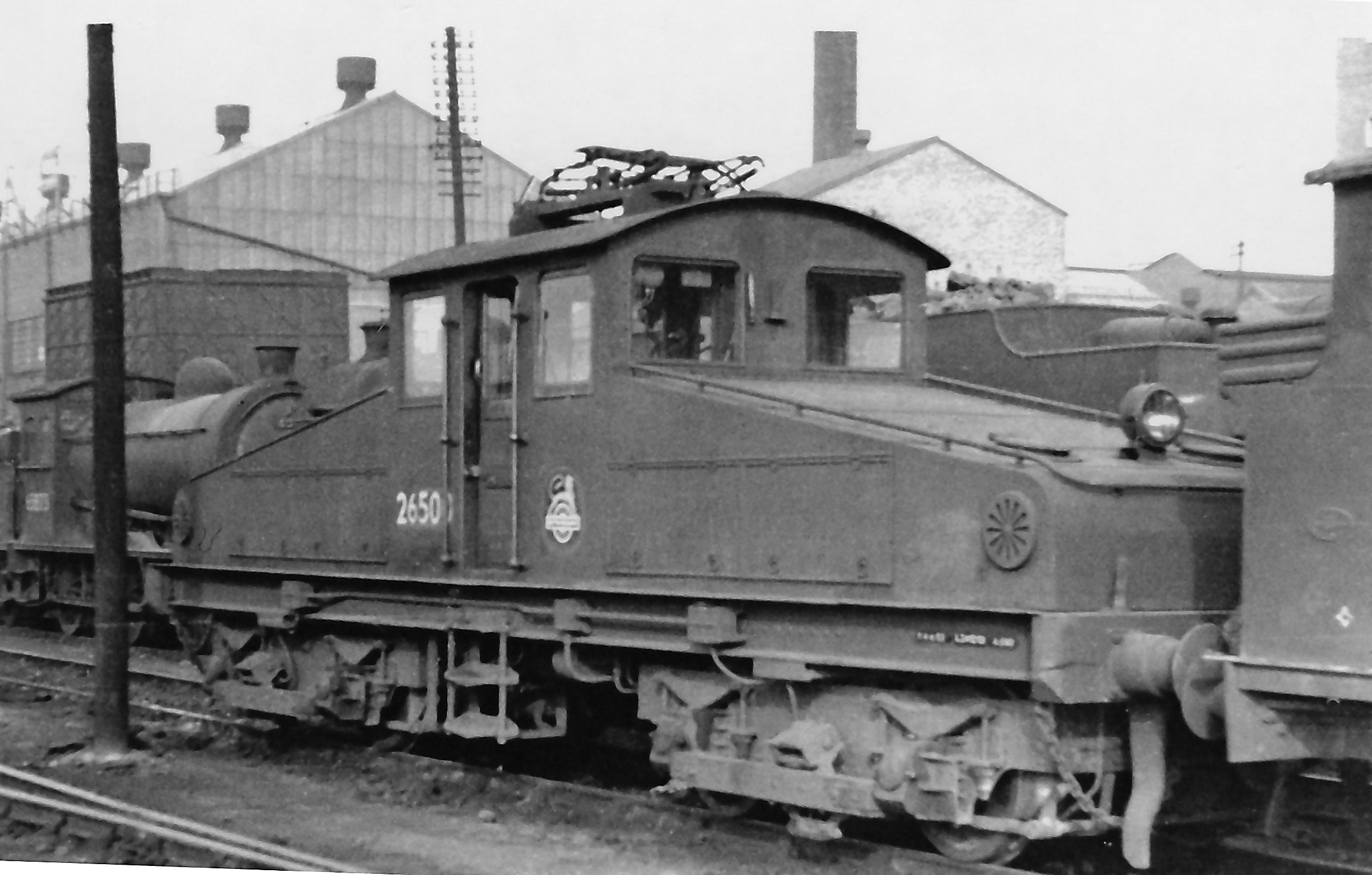
Ex-NER No.26500/BR Class ES1 at Heaton Shed

Originally built by the North Eastern Railway to provide steam locomotives serving principally the extensive Heaton marshalling yards and freight traffic, but also a considerable proportion of main line and local passenger traffic from Newcastle Central.

The location meant that it provided motive power to the .75 miles (1.21 km) and steep Riverside Branch. Unliked by crews due to the need to pass through three tunnels and the resultant toxic smoke in their cabs, in 1905 it was electrified using 750 VDC technology, with power supplied via both overhead catenary and, within the tunnels, third-rail. Both of the BTH/Brush 640 hp (BR Class ES1) locomotives were based at Heaton, designed as a Bo-Bo with central cab. They worked from the shed until 1967.

Coded 52B in the NE Region (Newcastle District) under British Railways, in 1954 it had an allocation of 95 locomotives, comprising:16x 4-6-2; 17x 2-6-2; 1x 4-4-0; 14x 2-6-0 (9 LNE + 5 LMS-type); 14x 0-6-0; 12x 2-6-2T; 1x 0-6-2T; 18x 0-6-0T; and 2x ES1's.

On 22 March 2022 a TransPennine Express Class 802 derailed at Heaton depot and collided with concrete barriers. There were no injuries reported.

== Present ==
After demolition and redevelopment to diesel traction in the 1960s by British Railways, today the depot is operated by Northern Trains, and mostly houses Northern and LNER rolling stock. The depot code is HT.

The basic allocation consists of Class 156 and British Rail Class 158 diesel multiple units operated by Northern. TransPennine Express, London North Eastern Railway and Lumo use the depot for storage or servicing of units.

Northern Trains Class 150 units also regularly visit Heaton for maintenance.

Network Rail's New Measurement Train is allocated to Heaton. Maintenance on its recording equipment is carried out at the Railway Technical Centre in Derby.

== Sewage and clean out ==
Heaton is used by the main express operator of the East Coast Main Line to store stock overnight. In 2004–06, this led to a dispute between the RMT and then operator GNER. Legally in the UK, train operators are allowed to discharge 5 imperial gallons (23 L; 6.0 US gal) of sewage per carriage per journey, onto the railtrack. Most Mk3 carriages have only holding tanks, not fully compliant toilet tanks. Further, Heaton then had no toilet clean-out facilities. However, in the 2000s both the RMT and politicians were concerned at the environmental impact of this legacy issue. In 2006 the RMT agreed waste tank and clean out developments at Heaton with GNER, plus new clean out procedures at all other depots, to solve an ongoing dispute over sewage spray.

== Location ==
The nearest station, from which the depot can also be seen, is Chillingham Road Metro station, whilst the nearest mainline station is Manors.
