= British Rail Class 156 =

British class of diesel multiple unit trains

Class 156 Super Sprinter
- A Northern Trains unit at Preston in 2025

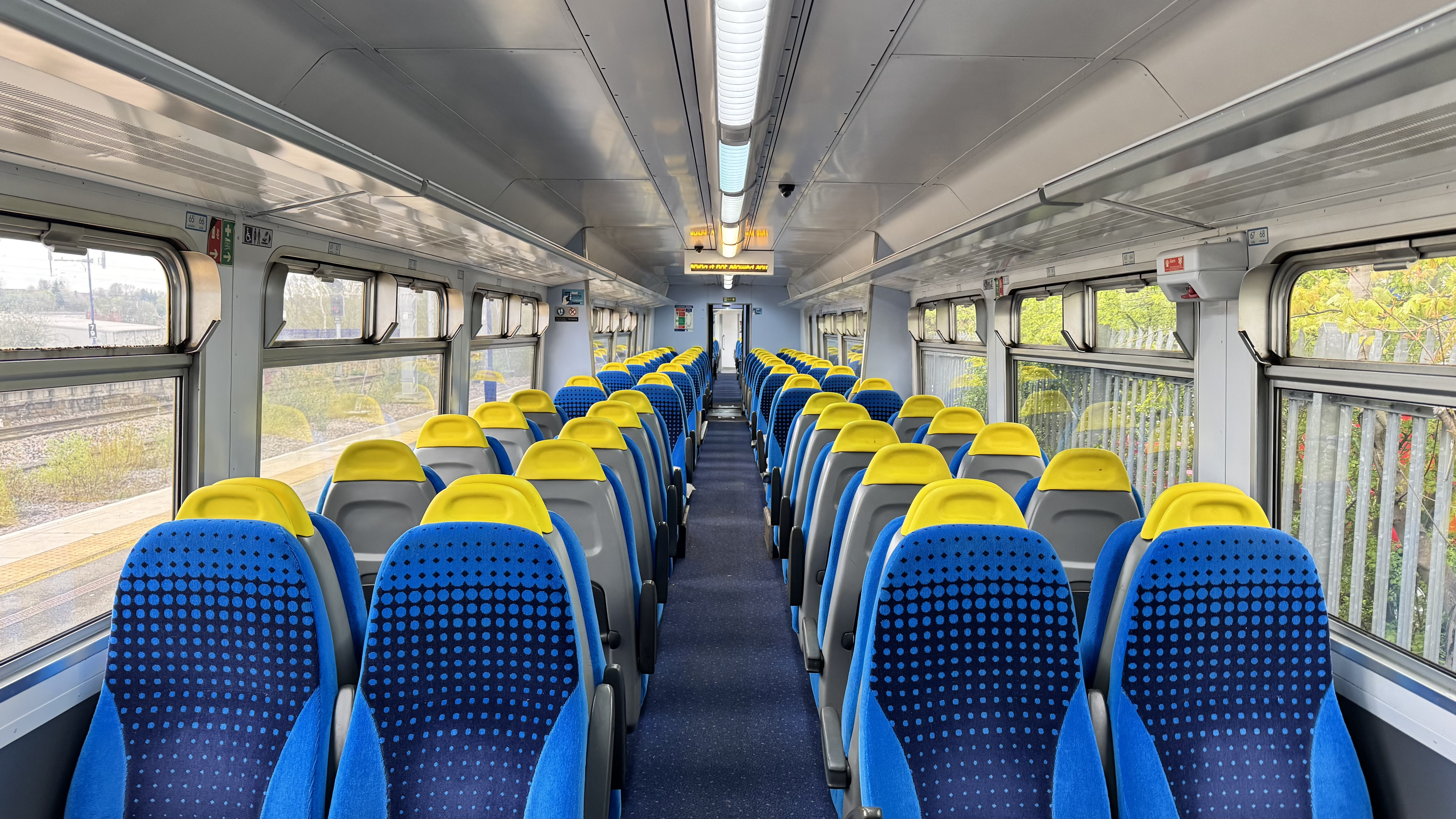
- Interior of a refurbished Northern Trains unit
- In service: 16 May 1988–present
- Manufacturer: Metro-Cammell
- Order nos.: 31028 (DMSL vehicles); 31029 (DMS vehicles)
- Built at: Washwood Heath, Birmingham
- Family name: Sprinter
- Replaced: Locomotive-hauled trains; First-generation DMUs
- Constructed: 1987–1989
- Number built: 114
- Number in service: 109
- Formation: Two cars per unit: DMSL-DMS
- Diagram: DMSL vehicles: DP244; DMS vehicles: DP245
- Fleet numbers: 156401–156514
- Capacity: As built: 163 seats; As refurbished: 146–152 seats
- Owners: Angel Trains; Brodies Leasing
- Operators: Current; Northern Trains; ScotRail; Former; Abellio ScotRail; Arriva Rail North; Arriva Trains Northern; Central Trains; East Midlands Trains; East Midlands Railway; First North Western; First ScotRail; Abellio Greater Anglia; Northern Rail; Regional Railways; ScotRail (National Express)
- Depots: Corkerhill (Glasgow); Etches Park (Derby); Heaton (Newcastle); Neville Hill (Leeds); Newton Heath (Manchester); Tyseley (Birmingham)

Specifications
- Car body construction: Steel
- Car length: 22.385 m (73 ft 5.3 in)
- Width: 2.730 m (8 ft 11.5 in)
- Height: 3.805 m (12 ft 5.8 in)
- Floor height: 1.135 m (3 ft 8.7 in)
- Doors: Single-leaf pocket sliding (two per side per car)
- Wheelbase: Bogies: 2.600 m (8 ft 6.4 in); Over bogie centres: 16.000 m (52 ft 5.9 in)
- Maximum speed: 75 mph (120 km/h)
- Weight: As built: DMSL vehicles: 38.6 t (38.0 LT; 42.5 ST); DMS vehicles: 37.9 t (37.3 LT; 41.8 ST)
- Prime mover: 2 × Cummins NT855-R5 (one per vehicle)
- Engine type: Inline-6 4-stroke turbo-diesel
- Displacement: 14 L (855 cu in) per engine
- Power output: 430 kW (570 hp) total
- Transmission: 2 × Voith T 211 r (hydrokinetic, one per vehicle)
- HVAC: Warm air
- UIC classification: 2′B′+B′2′
- Bogies: Powered: BREL P3-10; Unpowered: BREL BT38
- Minimum turning radius: 90.5 m (297 ft)
- Braking systems: Electro-pneumatic (tread) ('Westcode' three-step)
- Safety systems: AWS; TPWS
- Coupling system: BSI
- Multiple working: Within class, and with Classes 14x, 15x and 170
- Track gauge: 1,435 mm (4 ft 8 1/2 in) standard gauge

Notes/references
- Specifications as at March 1987, except where otherwise noted.

The British Rail Class 156 Super Sprinter is a type of diesel-hydraulic multiple unit passenger train. A total of 114 sets were built between 1987 and 1989 for British Rail by Metro-Cammell's Washwood Heath works. They were built to replace elderly first-generation diesel multiple units (DMUs) and locomotive-hauled passenger trains.

== Background ==
By the beginning of the 1980s, British Rail (BR) operated a large fleet of first generation DMUs, which had been constructed in prior decades to various designs. While formulating its long-term strategy for this sector of its operations, BR planners recognised that considerable costs would be incurred by undertaking refurbishment programmes necessary for the continued use of these ageing multiple units.

Planners instead examined the prospects for the development and introduction of a new generation of DMUs to succeed the first generation.

The initial specification was relatively ambitious, calling for a maximum speed of 90 mph (145 km/h) and acceleration comparable to contemporary electric multiple units (EMU). This specification led to the experimental Class 210 diesel-electric multiple unit (DEMU). However, it was found to be expensive and it was recognised that a production model assembled from proven components would possess greater reliability and lower maintenance costs; an availability rate of 85% was forecast.

By 1983, experiences with the Class 210 had influenced BR planners to favour procuring a new generation of DMUs, but to also adopt a new specification that were somewhat less demanding than before. Specifically, it was decided to drop the top speed from 90 to 75 mph (145 to 120 km/h), as testing had revealed the higher rate to deliver no perceivable improvement in journey times due to the typically short spacing of the stations the type was intended to serve. The requests for compatibility with other rolling stock were eliminated, although auto-coupling and auto-connecting functionality was added. In addition to a good ride quality, the specification included a sound level of 90 dB when at full speed, an operational range of 1,000 miles (1,600 km), and an interval between major overhauls of five years or 350,000 miles (560,000 km).

The bid submitted by British Rail Engineering Limited (BREL) was heavily based on its successful Class 455 EMU, sharing its body and the majority of its running gear, albeit equipped with two different power trains.

The resulting Class 150 was viewed as unsatisfactory for more-upmarket services. Studies showed coaches could be stretched, providing more internal volume and thus enabling the somewhat cramped two-by-three seating arrangement of the Class 150 to be substituted with a more roomy two-by-two counterpart. These changes could be implemented without impacting much of the benefits of adopting the existing design.

It was identified that this would result in a weight increase and thus a decreased power-to-weight ratio, but it was determined that the performance of the proposed DMU was only slightly lower; it could achieve similar journey times across the intended cross-country routes as the Class 150. It was also found that, while there was a slight increase in fuel consumption due to the changes, the envisioned DMU had lower fuel consumption than locomotive-hauled trains and lower maintenance costs. Accordingly, it was decided to proceed with developing a detailed specification and issuing it to industry. Amongst the requirements listed in the issued specification was the explicit statement of the acceptability of the proven power trains of both Classes 150 and 151.

== Description ==
The design of the Class 156 was relatively conservative in comparison to Metro-Cammell's earlier Class 151 design. Specific changes include the bodyshell being primarily composed of steel instead of aluminium; the deliberate decision to model the cab design on the earlier Class 150 was allegedly taken to ease union acceptance. Each coach is powered, being outfitted with a single six-cylinder Cummins NT855-R5 diesel engine coupled to a Voith T211r hydraulic transmission and Gmeinder final drive units.

The Class 156 can achieve a top speed of 75 mph (120 km/h). Construction of the welded bodyshells was subcontracted out; 118 by Procor Engineering of Horbury railway works in Wakefield, 60 by W.H. Davis of Mansfield and 50 by Standard Wagon of Heywood. Aston Martin Tickford were awarded the interior fitout contract.

The units were numbered 156401 to 156514. Each unit was formed of two powered vehicles, one of which contained a toilet. Individual vehicle are numbered as follows, where the final three digits of the vehicle number match the unit to which the vehicle belongs:

- 52401–52514: Driving Motor Standard Lavatory (DMSL)
- 57401–57514: Driving Motor Standard (DMS), containing an area for storing wheelchairs, bicycles and bulky luggage.

Unlike the Class 150 units, the 156s have a single-leaf sliding door at either end of each coach. This reflected the expected longer journeys with fewer stops that they were intended to operate. As with the Class 150, all the doors are operable by passengers when released by the guard using one of two passenger door control panels; they are energised using a carriage key to turn a rotary switch situated on the cab bulkhead. Units operated by Abellio ScotRail were fitted with additional door-control panels near the centre sets of doors, for the convenience of the guard.

Nine units used by Abellio Greater Anglia were transferred to East Midlands Railway in 2019, at which point they were renumbered into the 156/9 subclass (e.g. 156419 becoming 156919) to indicate that their public address and passenger information systems were incompatible with EMR's existing units. A number of these units started to transfer to Northern Trains from December 2021 onwards, at which point they were returned to their original numbers.

== Operations ==
=== British Rail ===
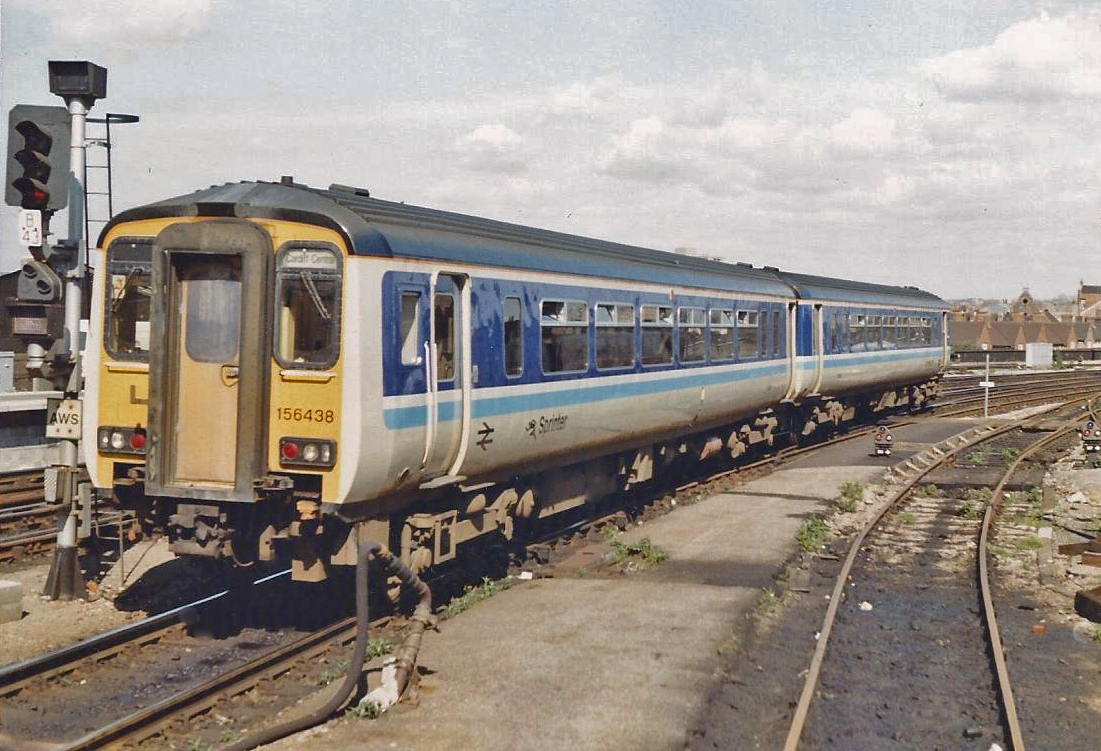
A Class 156 in Regional Railways livery, 1989

On 10 November 1987, 156401 conducted its first test run from Washwood Heath to Banbury. Between January and July 1988, 156401-156429 were delivered to Crown Point TMD entering service on 16 May 1988 on new services from East Anglia to North West England. They also operated services from Norwich and Cambridge to Birmingham New Street, and boat trains from Harwich International to Blackpool North and later Liverpool Lime Street.

The remaining 85 were delivered to Heaton, Neville Hill, Haymarket and Inverness. With the Class 155 units withdrawn temporarily with faulty door mechanisms, 25 were transferred to Cardiff Canton from December 1988, with the last remaining until November 1989. In this guise, they operated services as far south as Portsmouth Harbour. In May 1991, six were transferred from Crown Point to Derby Etches Park.

On 15 June 1989, 156502 was sent to the Netherlands, as part of the Dutch Railways' 150th anniversary celebrations; it returned on 10 July. On 21 October 1993, 156405 became the first Sprinter to accrue one million miles, whilst working the 10:10 Great Yarmouth to Norwich service.

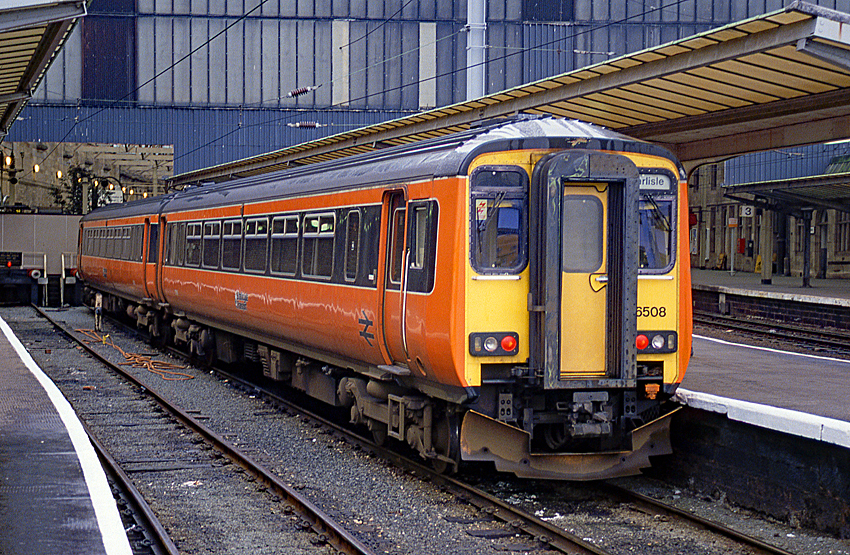
A Class 156 in Strathclyde livery at Carlisle Citadel, 1994

The first 100 were painted in Provincial sector's livery of blue and beige with light blue stripe. Twenty units based at Tyseley depot, 156401–156419 and 156422, were later repainted into Regional Railways' Express livery after the rebranding of Provincial. The last fourteen units were operated by Strathclyde PTE, carrying an orange and black livery. Following the delivery of the Class 158 Express Sprinters in the early 1990s, the 156s began to be cascaded to less important services.

In the early 1990s, BR was looking to save costs on rural routes, and decided that operating two-car trains was too expensive. The company planned to convert a number of units into single-car vehicles, named as Class 152. In the event, the decision was taken to do this with the Class 155 instead, forming the Class 153 fleet.

=== Post-privatisation ===
As part of the privatisation of British Rail, the fleet was split and sold to Angel Trains (76 units) and Porterbrook (38), which then leased the units to several train operating companies in the following regions:

==== Scotland ====
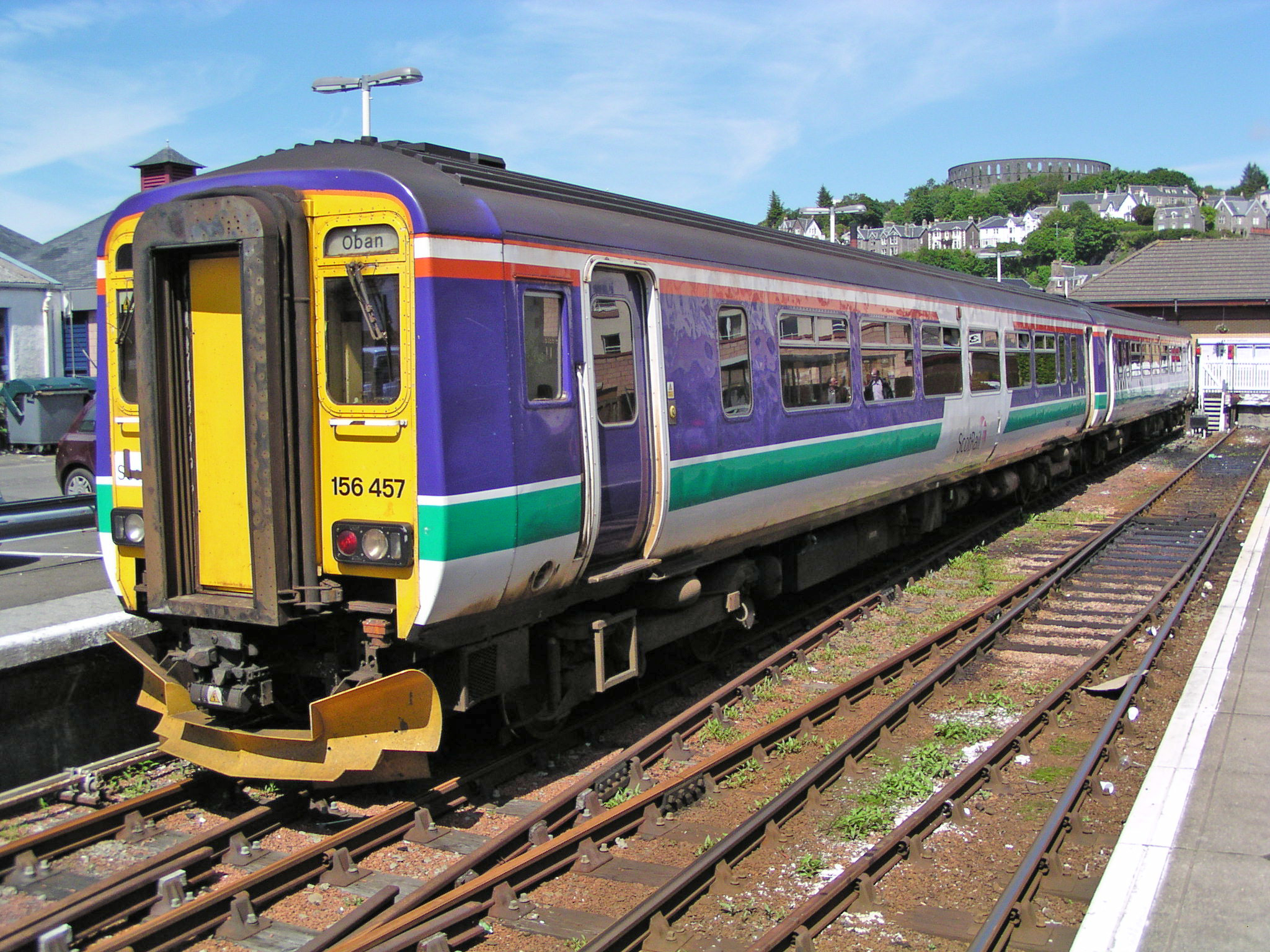
A First ScotRail Class 156 at Oban, 2005

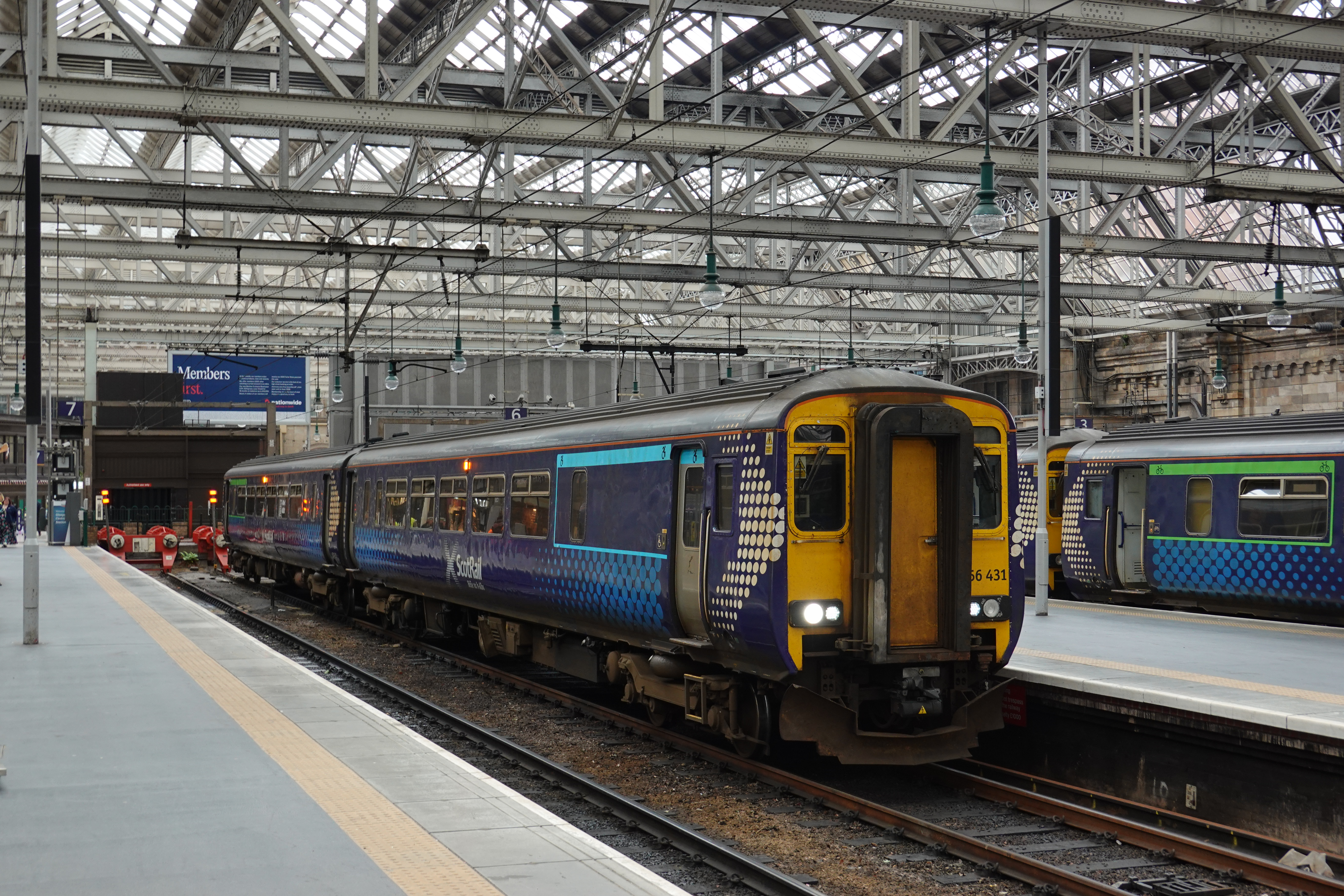
A ScotRail Class 156 at Glasgow Central, 2024

At privatisation the Scottish fleet passed to the National Express-owned ScotRail franchise, which used them until 2004 when the franchise was taken over by First ScotRail. All passed to Abellio ScotRail with the franchise in 2015.

Units 156500–156514 were operated by Strathclyde Partnership for Transport and originally wore its orange and black livery. This was replaced with a carmine and cream livery in 1997, which was also applied to further 14 units. Despite receiving these special liveries, the SPT units were not confined to any specific route and thus worked in tandem with the rest of the fleet on other routes.

In September 2008, Transport Scotland announced that all ScotRail trains (including those of Strathclyde Partnership for Transport) would be repainted in a new livery of blue with white saltire markings on the carriage ends. The first unit was repainted in this livery by RailCare Springburn in February 2009.

In December 2014, unit 156478 was written off by Angel Trains and sold to Brodie Leasing after being damaged by floodwaters on the Glasgow South Western Line. Brodie Leasing repaired the unit and it returned to service with Abellio ScotRail in October 2016.

Between 2016 and 2019, all of ScotRail's units were refurbished to make them compliant with PRM-TSI standard. This refurbishment included a larger toilet, a dedicated wheelchair area and brand new interior upholstery with new seats similar to those found on the Class 385.

In late 2018, five units transferred to Arriva Rail North after the Class 385s began to enter service.

From 2020, ScotRail's units began operating in multiple with Class 153 units on the West Highland Line, to provide upgraded seating and additional capacity for bicycles and other sporting equipment.

The ScotRail 156s currently operate the following routes:

- Glasgow Central to East Kilbride
- Glasgow Central to Kilmarnock/Carlisle
- Glasgow Central/Ayr to Girvan/Stranraer
- Glasgow Queen Street to Anniesland
- Glasgow Queen Street to Mallaig/Oban.

Only the fifteen units fitted with Radio Electronic Token Block signalling equipment can operate on the West Highland Line.

==== East Anglia ====
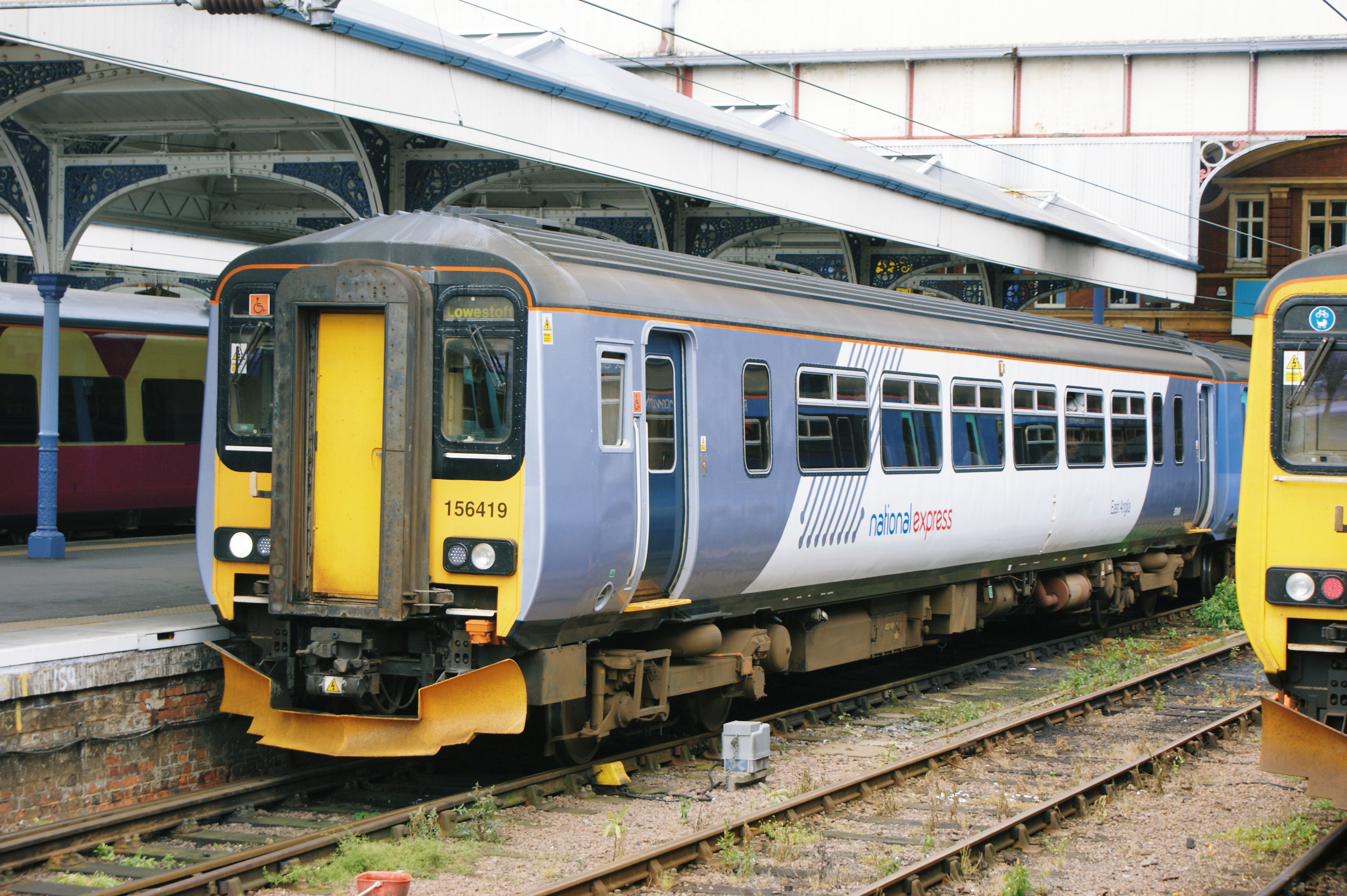
A National Express East Anglia unit

Having originally been based in the East Anglia region but later transferred away, they returned in early 2005, when One received nine from Central Trains in exchange for a similar number of Class 150s.

The units were used on the following local services:

- Bittern Line - Norwich to Sheringham, via Cromer
- Wherry Lines - Norwich to Great Yarmouth/Lowestoft
- East Suffolk Line - Ipswich to Lowestoft/Felixstowe
- Sudbury Branch Line - Marks Tey to Sudbury

They were also used on the longer-distance services between Ipswich and Cambridge/Peterborough.

All nine passed to Abellio Greater Anglia, when it took over the Greater Anglia franchise in February 2012. Despite being overhauled by Railcare Wolverton in 2012/13, including work to make them comply with disability legislation, all were replaced by Class 755s with the last day of service being 29 January 2020. These then moved to East Midlands Railway, where they were renumbered into the 156/9 subclass.

==== Northern England ====
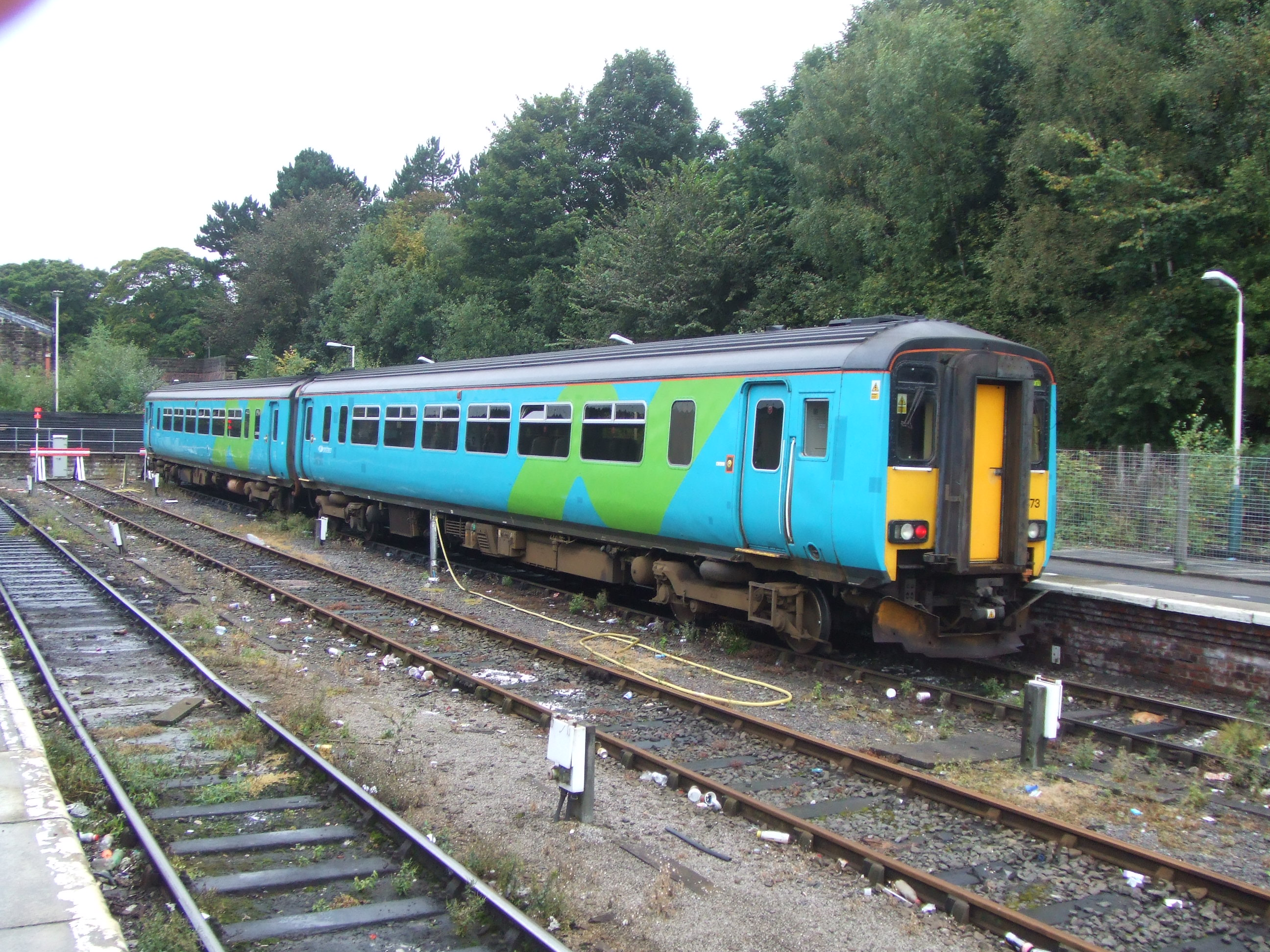
A Northern Spirit-liveried unit at Buxton in 2007

Following privatisation, both Arriva Trains Northern and First North Western-operated units and implemented their own refurbishment programmes. The two fleets were united when Northern Rail took over both franchises in 2004.

Within the Northern region, Class 156s are concentrated in the North West and also the North East, but are uncommon now in Yorkshire and Humberside, where Class 158s and other unit types are used instead.

In 2011, fourteen units were fitted with GPS as a trial for Northern Rail, being tested on the Esk Valley line. In 2011, four were transferred to East Midlands Trains.

In January 2015, Northern Rail began to hire units to First TransPennine Express to operate Manchester Airport to Blackpool North services. Northern Rail's fleet of 42 units passed to Arriva Rail North when the then-new franchise started on 1 April 2016. They began to operate Manchester Airport to Barrow-in-Furness and Oxenholme to Windermere services from this date, which were also transferred into the franchise.

An additional five units transferred to Northern from Abellio ScotRail in late-2018. On 1 March 2020, the Northern units were transferred to a new operator, Northern Trains.

Fifteen Class 156s were transferred from East Midlands Railway to Northern Trains; these included the nine Class 156/9s formerly used by Abellio Greater Anglia. Some of these units were already with Northern Trains. The delivery of them commenced at the December timetable change in 2021. For the December timetable change in 2022, five more units were transferred; with another in March 2023.

==== Midlands ====
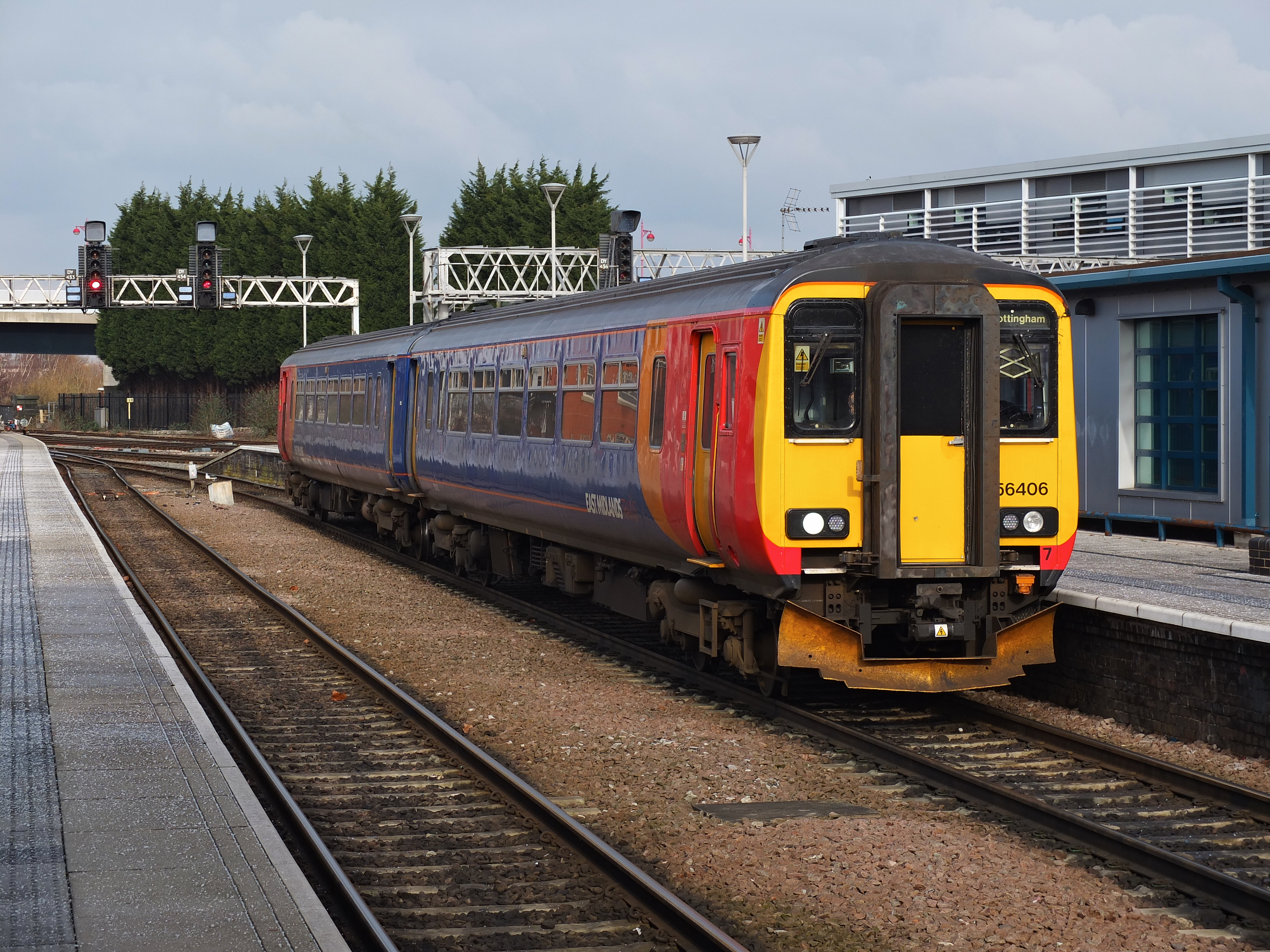
An East Midlands Trains unit at Derby, 2012

In 1997, Central Trains inherited twenty units from Regional Railways for use mainly on medium-distance services such as:

- Birmingham New Street to Nottingham, via Derby or Leicester
- Birmingham New Street to Hereford
- Birmingham New Street to Shrewsbury and the Cambrian Line
- Nottingham to Skegness or Lincoln.

In an attempt at fleet standardisation, preparations were made during 2003 to exchange all 20 Class 156s for an equal number of ScotRail Class 158s, with 156402 partially repainted in ScotRail colours in readiness when overhauled at Wabtec, Doncaster. The transfer did not proceed, after the Scottish Government refused to sanction the move, and the rest of the fleet were reliveried into Central Trains' colours between 2003 and 2005.

Nine units were transferred to One during early 2005, in exchange for a similar number of Class 150s.

At the end of the Central Trains franchise, the remaining 11 units were transferred to East Midlands Trains, which repainted the fleet during 2008 and then carried out a refurbishment programme from autumn 2010 onwards. The refurbishment, carried out at Neville Hill depot, included interior refurbishment work, improvements to driving cabs and installation of CCTV. These trains were used on slower medium-distance services such as Nottingham/Derby to Matlock, Nottingham to Skegness, Leicester to Lincoln and Nottingham to Worksop. In May 2011, four additional units were transferred from Northern Rail to allow Nottingham to Liverpool Lime Street services to be strengthened.

Beginning in late 2019, the nine units transferred to Abellio Greater Anglia in 2005, passed to East Midlands Railway. With a different public address and passenger information system to EMR's existing fleet, they were renumbered into the 156/9 subclass.

In December 2022, four units were sent for storage at Barrow Hill, with East Midlands Railway stating that they will be moved to Ely Papworth sidings at a later date.

== Fleet details ==
Class	Operator	Qty.	Year built	Cars	Unit nos.
156/0	Northern Trains	67	1987–1989	2	156401–156406, 156408–156429, 156438, 156440–156441, 156443–156444, 156447–156449, 156451–156452, 156454–156455, 156459–156461, 156463–156466, 156468–156469, 156471–156472, 156475, 156478–156491, 156496
156/0	ScotRail	42	1987–1989	2	156430–156437, 156439, 156442, 156445–156446, 156450, 156453, 156456–156458, 156462, 156467, 156474, 156476–156477, 156492–156495, 156499–156514
156/0	Stored	4	1987–1989	2	156470, 156473, 156497–156498
156/9	Stored	1	1987–1989	2	156907, moved to Heaton TMD November 2025

== Named units ==
Some units have received names:

- 156409 Cromer Pier seaside special (denamed)
- 156416 Saint Edmund (denamed)
- 156418 ESTA 1965-2015
- 156420 La'al Ratty - Ravenglass & Eskdale Railway
- 156426 The Yorkshire Dales Explorer
- 156433 The Kilmarnock Edition (denamed)
- 156438 Timothy Hackworth
- 156440 George Bradshaw
- 156441 William Huskisson MP (denamed)
- 156444 Councillor Bill Cameron
- 156448 Bram Stoker - Creator of Dracula
- 156449 Saint Columba (denamed)
- 156454 Whitby Endeavour (denamed)
- 156459 Benny Rothman - The Manchester Rambler (denamed)
- 156460 Driver John Axon GC (denamed)
- 156464 Lancashire Dales Rail (denamed)
- 156465 Bonnie Prince Charlie (denamed)
- 156466 Gracie Fields (formerly Buxton Festival)
- 156469 The Royal Northumberland Fusiliers (The Fighting Fifth) (denamed)
- 156477 Highland Festival (denamed)
- 156482 Elizabeth Gaskell
- 156483 William George Hardy
- 156490 Captain James Cook - Master Mariner

== Liveries ==
Operating company	Livery
Regional Railways	
Arriva Trains Northern	
Northern Rail	
Arriva Rail North	Class 156 in Arriva Northern Livery
Northern Trains	Class 156 in Northern Trains Livery
Abellio Greater Anglia	
One	
National Express	
East Midlands Railway	
First North Western	

== Accidents and incidents ==
- On 31 January 1995, in the Ais Gill accident, unit 156490 was derailed by a landslide, after which a train travelling in the opposite direction collided with it. The guard on-board 156490, Stuart Wilson, was killed.
- On 6 June 2010, unit 156499 derailed and briefly caught fire after striking a rockfall near Falls of Cruachan on the Oban branch of the West Highland Line; the fire was quickly put out using on-board fire extinguishers. Eight people were injured.
- On 17 August 2010, unit 156417 was involved in a collision with a slurry tanker at a user-operated level crossing in Suffolk. Twenty-one people were injured, one of them seriously.
- On 18 July 2012, unit 156478 was damaged by landslip debris near Falls of Cruachan station, about 1.5 km (0.9 mi) south-west of the location of the 2010 rockfall. The train had been travelling at a reduced speed of approximately 30 mph (48 km/h), due to the risk of rockfall after heavy rain, which potentially prevented it becoming derailed.
- On 21 December 2014, unit 156478 encountered floodwaters on the track near Mauchline, between Kilmarnock and Auchinleck. The unit was repaired and refurbished at Brodie Leasing's Kilmarnock works and returned to service in October 2016.
- On 22 January 2018, unit 156458 struck a landslip and was derailed between Arisaig and Glenfinnan on the West Highland Line. There were no injuries.
- On 7 January 2019, unit 156479 collided with a taxi on the Tyne Valley Line between Newcastle and Carlisle. There were no injuries.
- On 3 May 2024, unit 156443 collided with a car on the level crossing at Redcar Central.

== Models ==
Lima produced OO gauge models of Class 156 units, with sixteen variants available in total. Some of these models were subsequently relaunched by Hornby Railways in 2006.

Realtrack Models released their own OO-gauge models in 2017, in Regional Railways Provincial, First ScotRail and East Midlands Trains liveries.
