= British Rail Class 155 =

British class of diesel multiple unit trains

British Rail Class 155 Super Sprinter
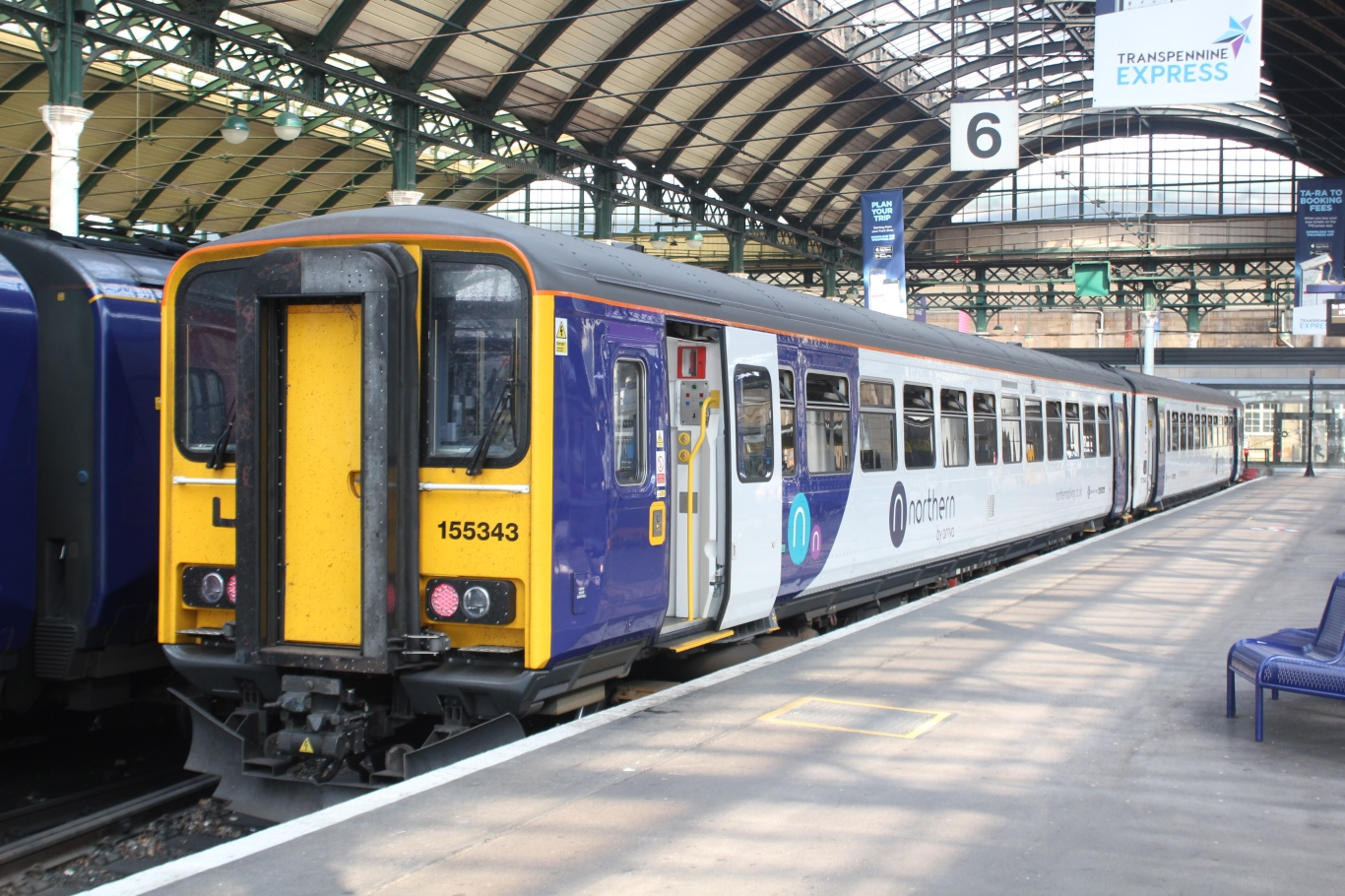
- An Arriva Rail North Class 155 at Hull Paragon in 2019

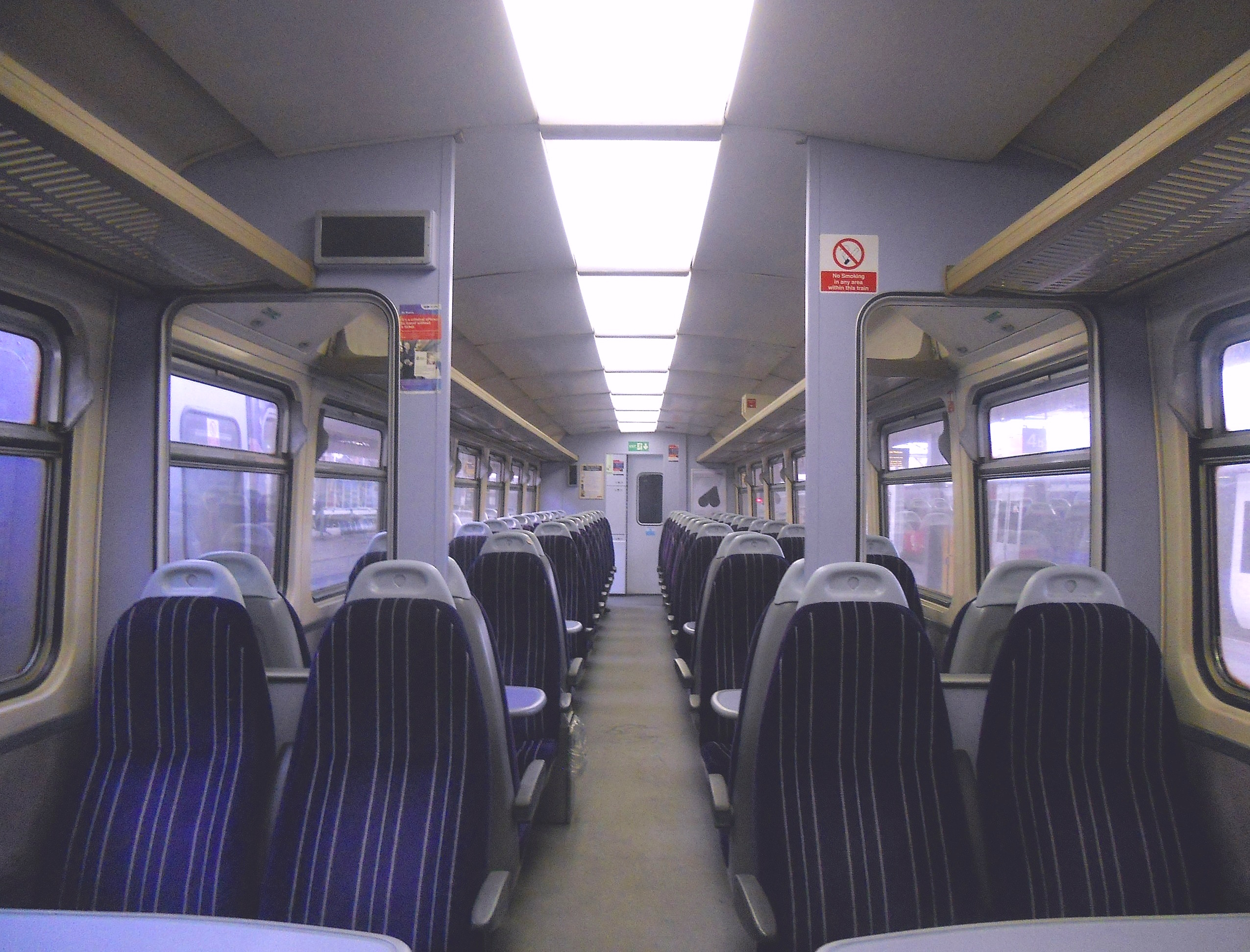
- The interior of a Northern Rail Class 155
- In service: 4 August 1987–present
- Manufacturer: Leyland Bus
- Order nos.: 31057 (DMSL vehicles), 31058 (DMS vehicles)
- Built at: Workington
- Family name: Sprinter
- Replaced: BR First-Generation DMUs
- Constructed: 1986–1987
- Entered service: 1988
- Refurbished: 2006–2007
- Number built: 42; (35 converted to Class 153)
- Number in service: 7
- Formation: 2 cars per unit: DMSL-DMS
- Diagram: DMSL vehicles: DP248, DMS vehicles: DP249
- Fleet numbers: First order: 155301–155335; (all converted to Class 153); Second order: 155341–155347
- Capacity: 160 seats (80 per vehicle)
- Owner: Porterbrook
- Operators: Current: Northern Trains; Former: Arriva Trains Northern, Northern Rail, Arriva Rail North, Regional Railways
- Depot: Botanic Gardens TMD (Hull)
- Lines served: Harrogate Line, Hull to Scarborough Line, Hull to York Line

Specifications
- Car body construction: Steel
- Car length: 23.208 m (76 ft 1.7 in)
- Width: 2.700 m (8 ft 10.3 in)
- Height: 3.746 m (12 ft 3.5 in)
- Doors: Single-leaf sliding plug; (2 per side per car)
- Wheelbase: Bogies: 2.6 m (8 ft 6 in); Bogie centres: 16.0 m (52 ft 6 in)
- Maximum speed: 75 miles per hour (121 km/h)
- Weight: DMSL: 38.8 t (38.2 long tons; 42.8 short tons), DMS: 37.9 t (37.3 long tons; 41.8 short tons) (Note: Diagrams DP248 1B and DP249 1B additionally describe a Class 155/1 variant, in which the tare weights are 39.4 t (38.8 long tons; 43.4 short tons) for the DMSL vehicle and 38.6 t (38.0 long tons; 42.5 short tons) for the DMS vehicle.)
- Prime mover: 2 × Cummins NT855-R5 (one per vehicle)
- Engine type: Inline-6 4-stroke turbo-diesel
- Displacement: 14 L (855 cu in) per engine
- Power output: 430 kW (570 hp) total
- Transmission: Voith T 211 r (hydrokinetic) (one per vehicle)
- HVAC: Warm air & hot-water radiators
- UIC classification: 2′B′+B′2′
- Bogies: Powered: BREL P3-10; Unpowered: BREL BT38
- Minimum turning radius: 90 m (295 ft 3 in)
- Braking system: Electro-pneumatic (tread)
- Safety systems: AWS; TPWS
- Coupling system: BSI
- Multiple working: Within class, plus Classes 14x, 15x and 170
- Track gauge: 1,435 mm (4 ft 8 1/2 in) standard gauge

Notes/references
- As-built specifications sourced from except where otherwise noted.

The British Rail Class 155 Super Sprinter is a diesel multiple unit passenger train. The units were built by Leyland Bus at Workington between 1986 and 1987, as part of British Rail's replacement of its ageing first-generation diesel fleet; it incorporated some Leyland National bus components. There were 42 units built, of which only 7 remain; the other 35 units were converted to Class 153 railcars.

== Background ==
By the beginning of the 1980s, British Rail (BR) operated a large fleet of first generation DMUs, which had been constructed in prior decades to various designs. While formulating its long-term strategy for this sector of its operations, British Rail planners recognised that there would be considerable costs incurred by undertaking refurbishment programmes necessary for the continued use of these aging multiple units. Planners instead examined the prospects for the development and introduction of a new generation of DMUs to succeed the first generation.

The initial specification was relatively ambitious, calling for a maximum speed of 90 mph (145 km/h), acceleration comparable to contemporary electric multiple units (EMUs). This specification led to the experimental Class 210 diesel-electric multiple unit. However, it was found to be expensive, and it was recognised that a production model assembled from proven components would possess greater reliability and lower maintenance costs; an availability rate of 85 percent was forecast.

By 1983, experiences with the Class 210 had influenced BR planners to favour procuring a new generation of DMUs, and also to adopt a new specification that was somewhat less demanding than before. Specifically, it was decided to drop the top speed from 90 mph to 75 mph, as testing had revealed the higher rate to deliver no perceivable improvement in journey times due to the typically short spacing of the stations the type was intended to serve. The requests for compatibility with other rolling stock were eliminated, although auto-coupling and auto-connecting functionality was added. In addition to a good ride quality, the specification included a sound level of 90 dB when at full speed, an operational range of 1,000 miles and an interval between major overhauls of five years or 350,000 miles.

The bid submitted by British Rail Engineering Limited (BREL) was heavily based on its successful Class 455 EMU, sharing its body and the majority of its running gear, albeit equipped with two different power trains.

The resulting Class 150 was viewed as unsatisfactory for more-upmarket services. Studies showed coaches could be stretched, providing more internal volume and thus enabling the somewhat cramped two-by-three seating arrangement of the Class 150 to be substituted with a more roomy two-by-two counterpart. These changes could be implemented without impacting much of the benefits of adopting the existing design.

It was identified that this would result in a weight increase and thus a decreased power-to-weight ratio, but it was determined that the performance of the proposed DMU was only slightly lower, and it could achieve similar journey times across the intended cross-country routes as the Class 150. It was also found that, while there was a slight increase in fuel consumption due to the changes, the envisioned DMU had lower fuel consumption than locomotive-hauled trains and lower maintenance costs. Accordingly, it was decided to proceed with developing a detailed specification and issuing it to industry. Amongst the requirements listed in the issued specification was the explicit statement of the acceptability of the proven power trains of both the Class 150 and Class 151.

== Description ==
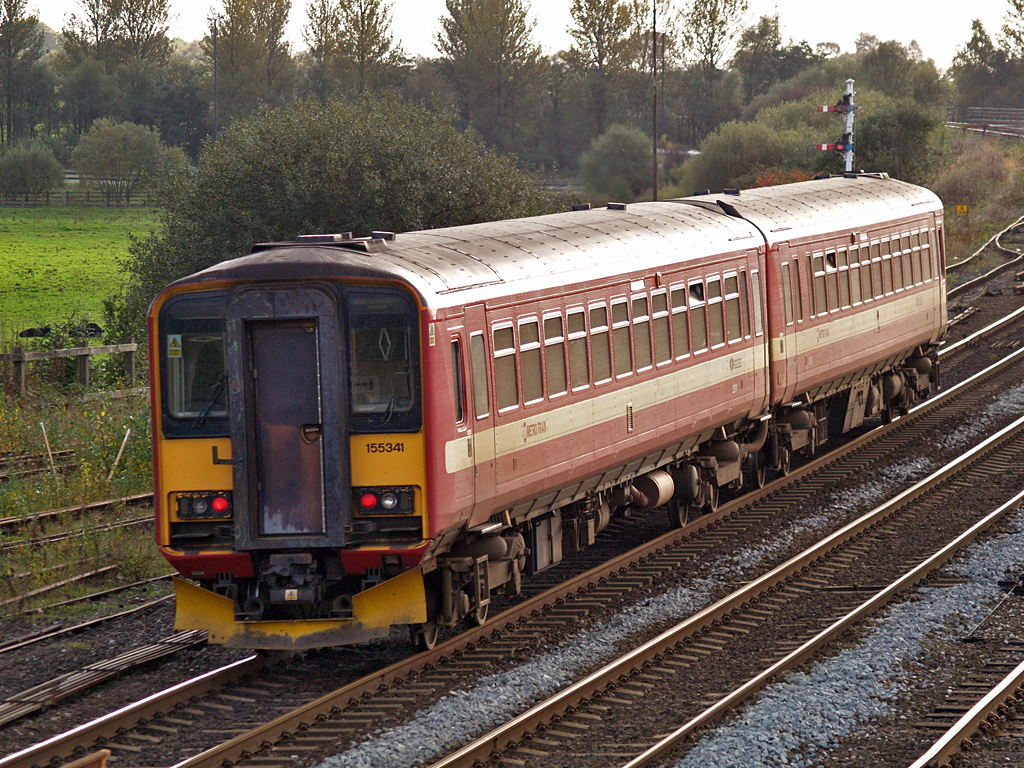
A WYPTE Class 155 in original carmine and cream livery

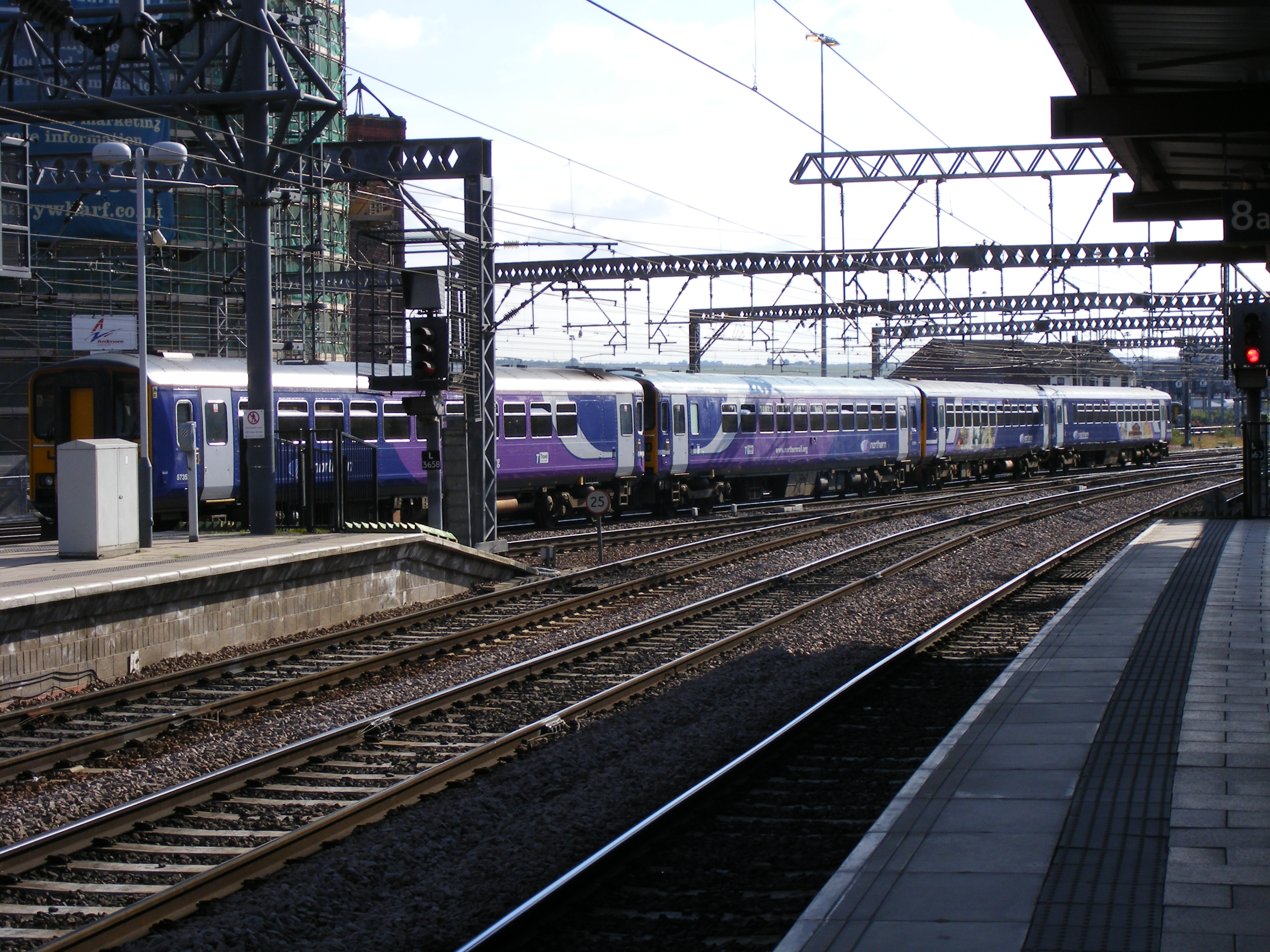
A Northern Rail Class 155 (rear) coupled with two Class 153s arranged in their original formation at Leeds

Class 155 units are formed of two 23-metre-long (75 ft 6 in) vehicles, a stretch of 3 m (9 ft 10 in) per vehicle compared to Class 150 units. Each vehicle is fitted with an underfloor-mounted Cummins NT855-R5 turbo-diesel engine, producing up to 213 kW (285 hp), driving both axles of the inside-end bogie via a Voith hydrokinetic transmission.

The fleet was part of the Super Sprinter build; the other part of which was the Class 156 fleet, of which only the latter carried the branding. They were manufactured by British Leyland, who used similar construction techniques to those used on the more basic Pacer railbuses. The relatively lightweight body, which was mounted on a welded floor assembly, comprised a series of pre-formed panels that were fixed together via the extensive use of Avdel rivets. The body is lined with a somewhat large number of windows, which is said to make the coaches appear unusually long; despite considerations towards adopting sealed windows to reduce noise levels, the windows are openable for natural ventilation.

== Fleet details ==
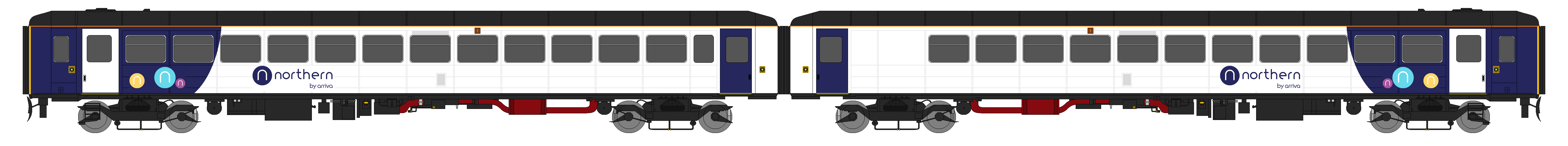
Illustration of a Class 155 unit in Arriva Rail North livery

== Model railways ==
In 2000, Hornby Railways launched its first version of the Class 155 in OO gauge.
