= Sprinter (British Rail) =

Classes of British diesel multiple unit trains

Sprinter (train)
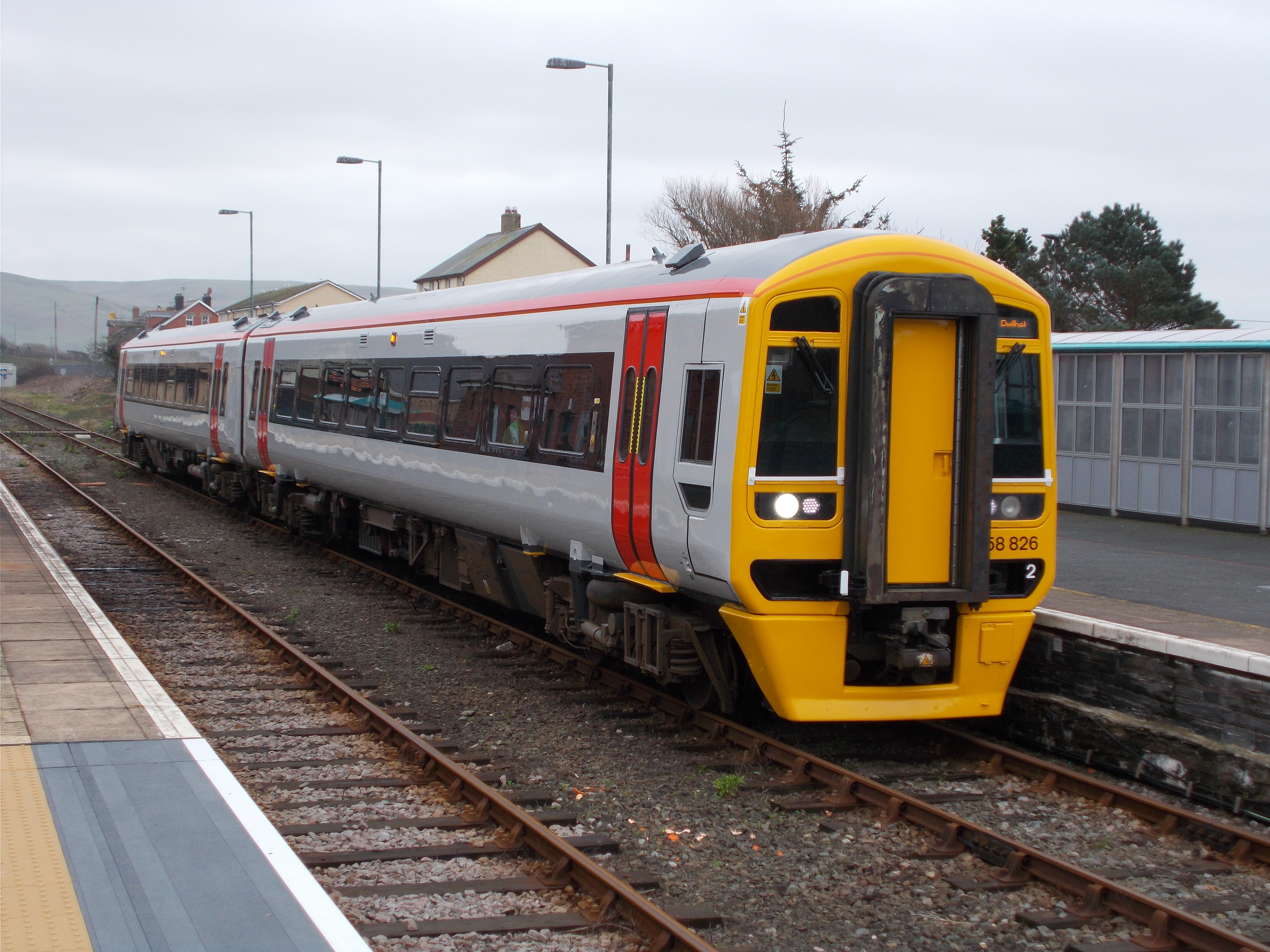
- A Class 158 at Tywyn in 2019
- In service: 1984–present
- Family name: Sprinter
- Number built: 556 trainsets
- Number scrapped: 9 cars
- Operators: East Midlands Railway; Great Western Railway; London Northwestern Railway; Northern Trains; ScotRail; South Western Railway; State Railway of Thailand; Transport for Wales

Specifications
- Maximum speed: 75 mph (121 km/h) (Class 150, 153, 155, 156); 90 mph (140 km/h) (Class 158, 159)
- Track gauge: 1,435 mm (4 ft 8 1/2 in) standard gauge (UK trains); 1,000 mm (3 ft 3 3/8 in) metre gauge (Thailand trains)

The Sprinter is a name given to several classes of diesel multiple unit trains in use on the British railway system. They were built in the 1980s and early 1990s by British Rail Engineering Limited (BREL), Metro-Cammell and Leyland. Sprinters operate in almost every part of Great Britain, from rural branch lines to commuter expresses into major cities.

The group includes Class 150, 151, 153, 154, 155, 156, 158 and 159. Most have Cummins engines with Voith hydraulic transmissions, although 47 Class 158 units have Perkins engines instead.

Originally British Rail coined the Sprinter name for the units, mainly to promote the superior acceleration capabilities of the units compared with the first-generation diesel multiple units (DMUs) that they replaced. Advertisements such as "The Sprinters are coming" were advertised locally in newspapers when these trains were scheduled to be introduced. Great play was also made of, in many cases, reduced journey times.

== Background ==
By the beginning of the 1980s, British Rail (BR) operated a large fleet of first generation DMUs, which had been constructed in prior decades to various designs. While formulating its long-term strategy for this sector of its operations, BR planners recognised that there would be considerable costs incurred by undertaking refurbishment programmes necessary for the continued use of these aging multiple units, particularly due to the necessity of handling and removing hazardous materials such as asbestos. In light of the high costs involved in retention, planners examined the prospects for the development and introduction of a new generation of DMUs to succeed the first generation.

In the concept stage, two separate approaches were devised, one involving a so-called railbus that prioritised the minimisation of both initial (procurement) and ongoing (maintenance & operational) costs, these were developed into the Pacer series, while the second approach was a more substantial DMU that could deliver superior performance than the existing fleet, particularly when it came to long-distance services. The initial specification developed for the latter type was relatively ambitious for the era, calling for a maximum speed of 90 mph (145 km/h), a rate of acceleration compatible to contemporary electric multiple units (EMUs), the ability to couple/work in multiple with existing EMUs, facilitate through-access for passengers, feature pressure ventilation, the ability to assist another failed unit and to comprise either a three- or four-car consist.

This specification led to the development of the experimental Class 210 DMU. However, to deliver the performance specified, it was found that relatively expensive equipment had to be used, particularly to provide sufficient speed, acceleration and through-passenger access; it also had maintainability problems due to space limitations. Despite these shortcomings, it was recognised that a production fleet that was assembled from proven components would possess both a greater reliability level and lower maintenance costs; it was forecast to achieve an availability rate of 85 percent. As such, the type had sufficiently demonstrated a promising reduction in maintenance costs was achievable, especially once initial teething problems were dealt with, as well as the wider value represented by a new generation of DMUs in the reduction of ongoing costs for BR.

By 1983, experiences with the Class 210 had influenced planners to favour the procurement of a new generation of DMUs, but to also adopt a new set of specifications that were somewhat less demanding than the prior set. Specifically, it was decided to drop the top speed from 90 mph to 75 mph, as testing had revealed the higher speed did not deliver any perceivable improvement in journey times due to the typically short spacing of the stations the type was intended to serve. Furthermore, it was determined that a propulsion system delivering 7 hp per tonne would deliver sufficient acceleration. The requests for compatibility with other rolling stock were eliminated, although auto-coupling and auto-connecting functionality was added. In addition to a good ride quality, the specification included a sound level of 90 dB when at full speed, an operational range of 1,000 miles and an interval between major overhauls of five years or 350,000 miles.

In comparison to the prior generation of DMUs, which typically used a pair of engines for each power car, the new generation DMU would only use a single engine per car; sufficient cooling was also provided that even with one failed engine, a two-car unit could continue to perform typical services without incurring a major performance deficient. For an operational perspective, it was intended that the DMU could be assembled akin to building blocks, comprising between two and four cars that may or may not be outfitted with various passenger amenities such as toilets and luggage spaces.

Initially formalised as a business specification, these requirements were transferred into a relatively broad technical specification that avoided any specifics other than those that were deemed essential for compatibility purposes. Thereafter, it was issued to various rolling stock manufacturers for a competitive tender. As a part of this process, these manufacturers submitted bids to construct an initial series of three-car prototypes as demonstration units. A relatively constrained timetable of only 18 months between the date of order to delivery of these prototypes was also specified; this has been attributed as having restricted manufacturers to overwhelming lean towards existing industrial practices for their submissions.

In response to the specification, several submissions were received by BR. The bid submitted by BREL was heavily based on its successful Class 455 EMU, sharing its body and the majority of its running gear, albeit equipped with two different power trains. The railway engineering company Metro-Cammell also bid, offered its own design that employed rivetted aluminium construction; this feature was attributed as enabling a meaningful reduction in weight over conventional methods. BR officials quickly opted to proceed with a pair of prototypes from both BREL and Metro-Cammell, issuing orders to these manufacturers henceforth.

== Prototypes ==
BREL and Metro-Cammell built 2 x three-coach prototypes for the first batch of Sprinters, the Class 150/0 and 151.

Class	Image	Top speed		Number	Built	Notes
Class	Image	mph	km/h	Number	Built	Notes
150/0		75	121	2	1984	One of these BREL prototypes was very similar to the production Class 150 units, with a Cummins engine and Voith gearbox. The other was fitted with a Rolls-Royce engine and Self Changing Gears (SCG) transmission. The latter unit would suffer various problems with both of these components, but would later become the only Class 154 and was used as a Class 158 testbed.
151		75	121	2	1985	Built by Metro-Cammell, these featured the same Cummins engine as the Class 150. They had aluminium body shells and American twin disc hot-shift gearboxes. They suffered from a jerky and violent gearshift, which was never fully rectified. BREL's Class 150 design won the contract from British Rail and the Class 151 never entered production.
154		90	145	1	1985	A class of a single unit, which was converted from a Class 150 prototype but fitted with a different engine and gearbox. It became a Class 158 testbed; its problematic gearbox was replaced with an improved American twin-disc hot shift transmission with different control software, which finally resulted in smooth gear-changes; air conditioning was also fitted. C Later converted back to a standard Class 150.

== Production units ==
Class	1 car Set	2 car Set	3 car Set	Total Sets	Total Cars
Class 150	–	132	2	134	273
Class 153	70	–	–	70	70
Class 155	–	7	–	7	14
Class 156	–	114	–	114	228
Class 158		147	21	168	357
Class 159	–	–	30	30	90
Totals	70	397	56	523	1032

The production units were all built as two coach units, with the exception of 17 Class 158s and the 22 Class 159 units, which were built with an additional centre car. The Class 153 railcars were converted from the two coach Class 155s.

Classes 150, 153, 155 and 156 units have no air-conditioning and a top speed of 75 mph (121 km/h); Classes 158 and 159 have air conditioning and a top speed of 90 mph (145 km/h). All units, except the first two batches of Class 150s, have outer-end gangways, allowing passengers to walk between trains working in multiple.

All Sprinters have BSI couplers, which allow them to work in multiple with any other Sprinters and also Class 142, 143, 144 and 170 units. However, they cannot work in multiple with Class 165 or 166 units due to incompatible wiring arrangements.

=== Class 150 Sprinter ===
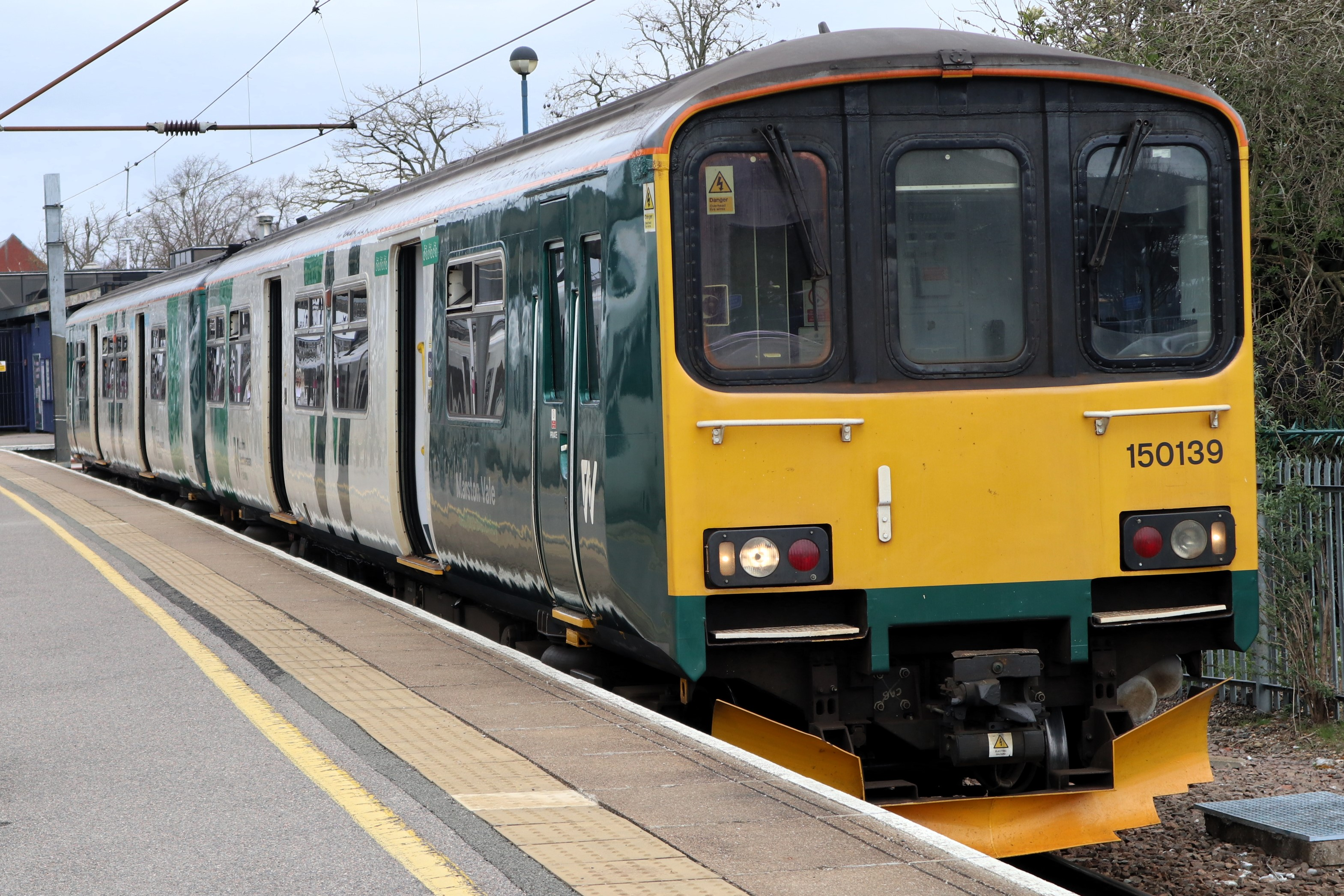
A London Northwestern Railway Class 150 at Bedford

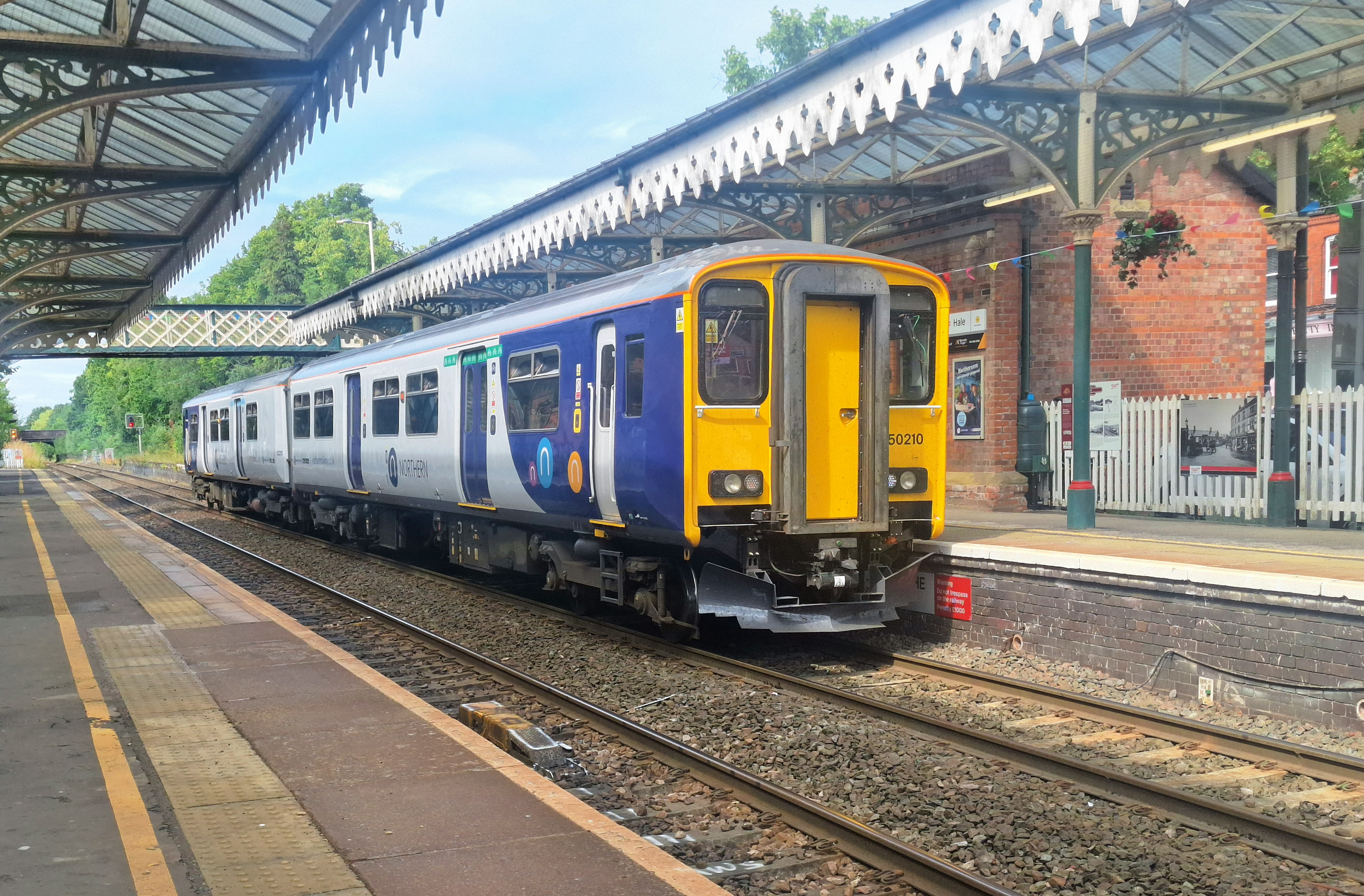
A Northern Class 150/2 at Hale

These were designed as commuter units and are fitted with 5 abreast seating and doors fitted at 1/3 and 2/3 down the length of each car, unique amongst Sprinters. For the era, the Class 150 provided exceptional ride quality; it also was fully compliant with BR's 50 percent engine-out performance requirements. Early units had no end gangway therefore, in multiple-working with other Sprinter units, passengers can not move between units. The 150/2s do feature end gangways, as well as two-by-two airline seating.

==== 150/0 ====
Currently operated by:

- Northern Trains.

==== 150/1 ====
Currently operated by:

- London Northwestern Railway
- Northern Trains.

==== 150/2 ====
Currently operated by:

- Great Western Railway
- Northern Trains
- Transport for Wales.

==== Class 950 ====
In addition to the standard Class 150 units, a single two-car DMU was constructed using the same bodyshell for use as a track assessment unit on stretches of line where heavier stock cannot be safely used. This unit was initially classified as Class 180, but was reclassified in the departmental series as Class 950 upon the entry into service of the Class 180 Adelantes.

=== Class 153 Super Sprinter ===
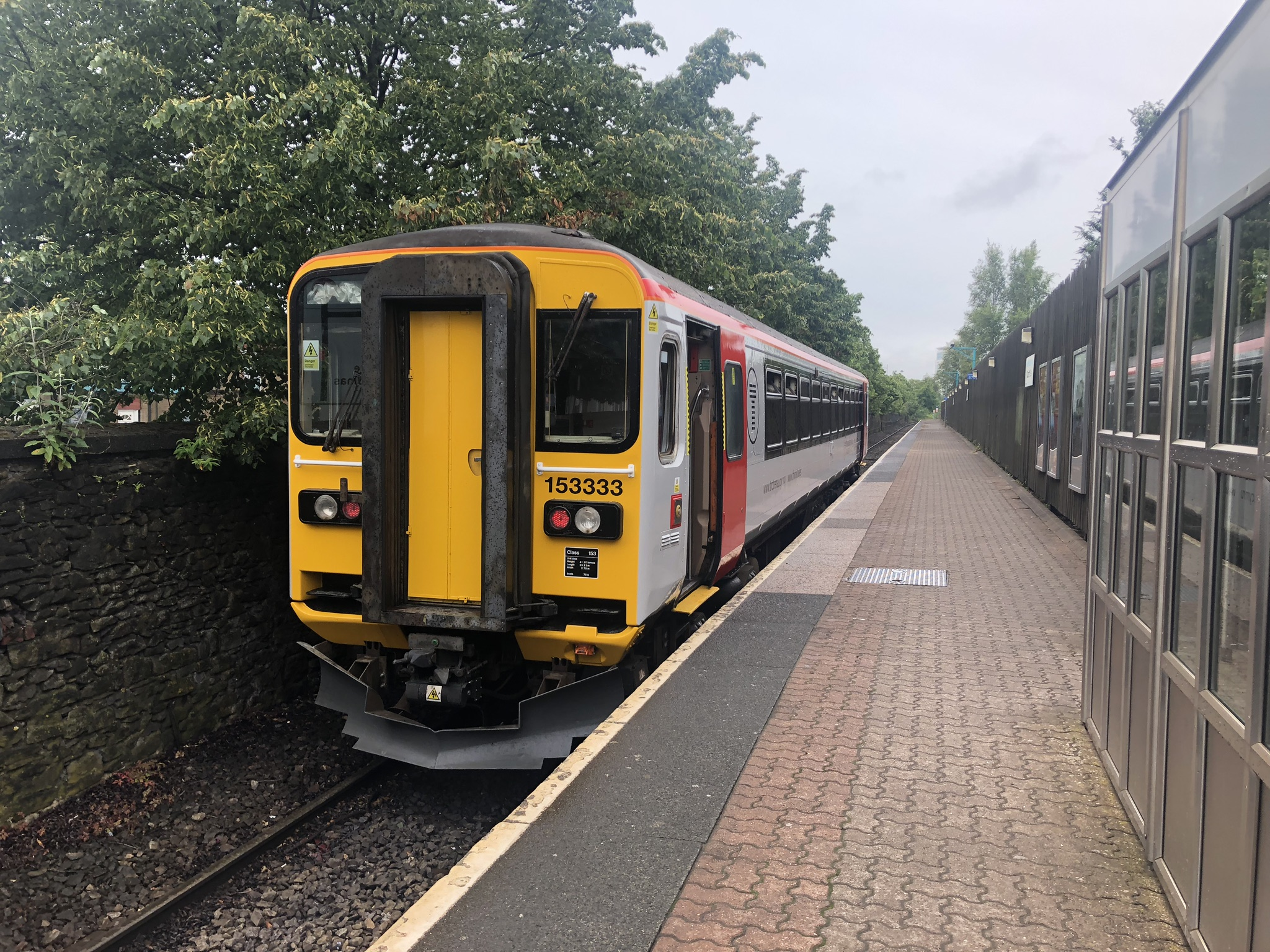
A Transport for Wales Class 153 at Cardiff Bay

These single-car units were originally built as two-car Class 155 units by Leyland from 1987 to 1988, but were converted by Hunslet-Barclay at Kilmarnock from 1991 to 1992. The class was built for lightly used lines, replacing first generation single coach units. The conversion involved building a new cab at the original inner ends of the vehicles. The layout of the original non-cab ends was subtly different from the original cab end, so the ends are noticeably different, and the vehicle not symmetrical. The new cab is significantly smaller than the original Leyland cab and pushes back into the door area. After their passenger careers, some have been converted to track inspection units by Network Rail.

Currently operated by:

- Network Rail
- ScotRail
- Transport for Wales.

=== Class 155 Super Sprinter ===
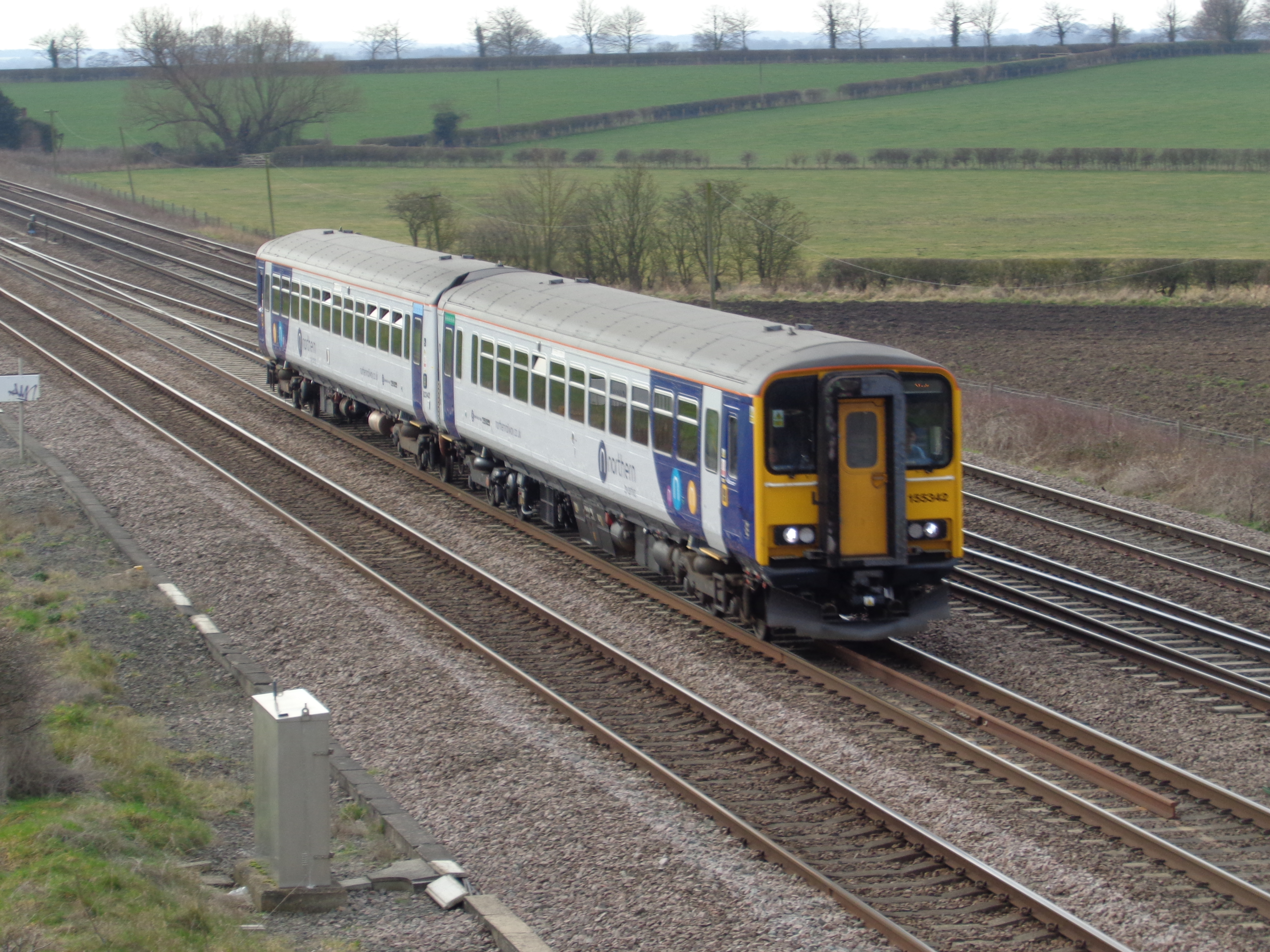
An Arriva Rail North Class 155 at Leeds

Early on, it was recognised that the Class 150 would be unsatisfactory in some criteria for more-upmarket services, but that a derivative of the type would likely better handle these services. Thus, such DMUs were built by British Leyland at Workington (using a body construction technology derived from the Leyland National bus) between 1987 and 1988. They have a top speed of 75 mph (121 km/h). Changes from the Class 150 included discarding openable windows in favour of fully-sealed units, while the external doors were relocated into vestibules at the end of each coach to reduce internal noise levels.

Furthermore, the coaches were stretched to provide more internal volume, substituting the two-by-three seating arrangement of the Class 150 with a more roomy two-by-two counterpart. These changes could be implemented without impacting much of the benefits of adopting the existing design, although did result in an increased weight and thus a decreased power-to-weight ratio. Of the original 42 units built, only 7 remain, due to the majority having been converted into the Class 153.

Currently operated by:

- Northern Trains.

=== Class 156 Super Sprinter ===
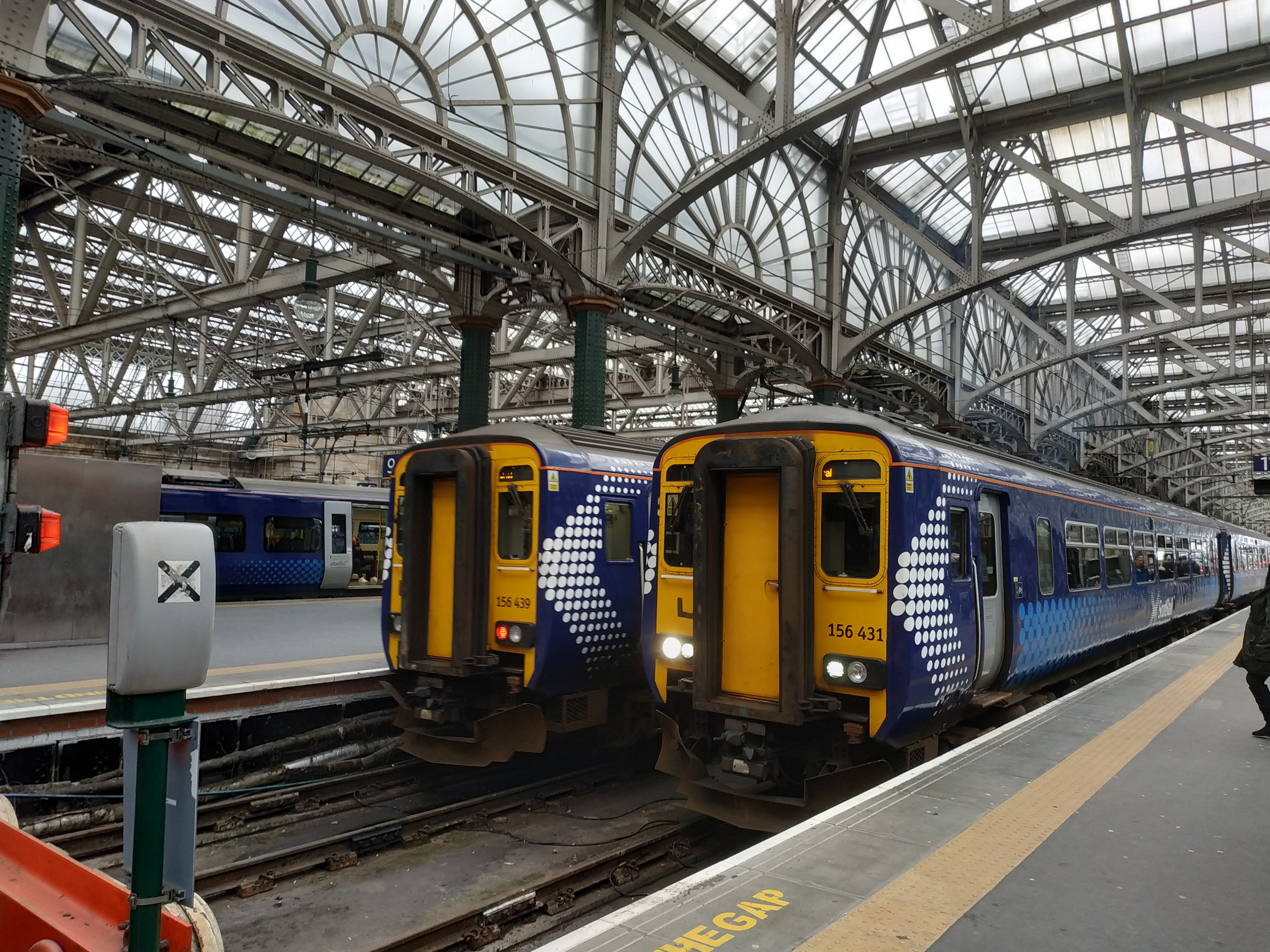
An Abellio ScotRail Class 156 at Glasgow Central

The Class 156 units were built from 1987 to 1989 by Metro-Cammell at its Washwood Heath Works in Birmingham. The vehicles, like the Class 155s, have a single leaf sliding door at either end of each coach; this feature reflected the anticipated longer journeys (with fewer stops) that the Class 156 was intended to operate. They have a top speed of 75 mph (121 km/h) and feature medium density (2+2) seating.

Currently operated by:

- Northern Trains
- ScotRail.

=== Class 158 Express Sprinter ===
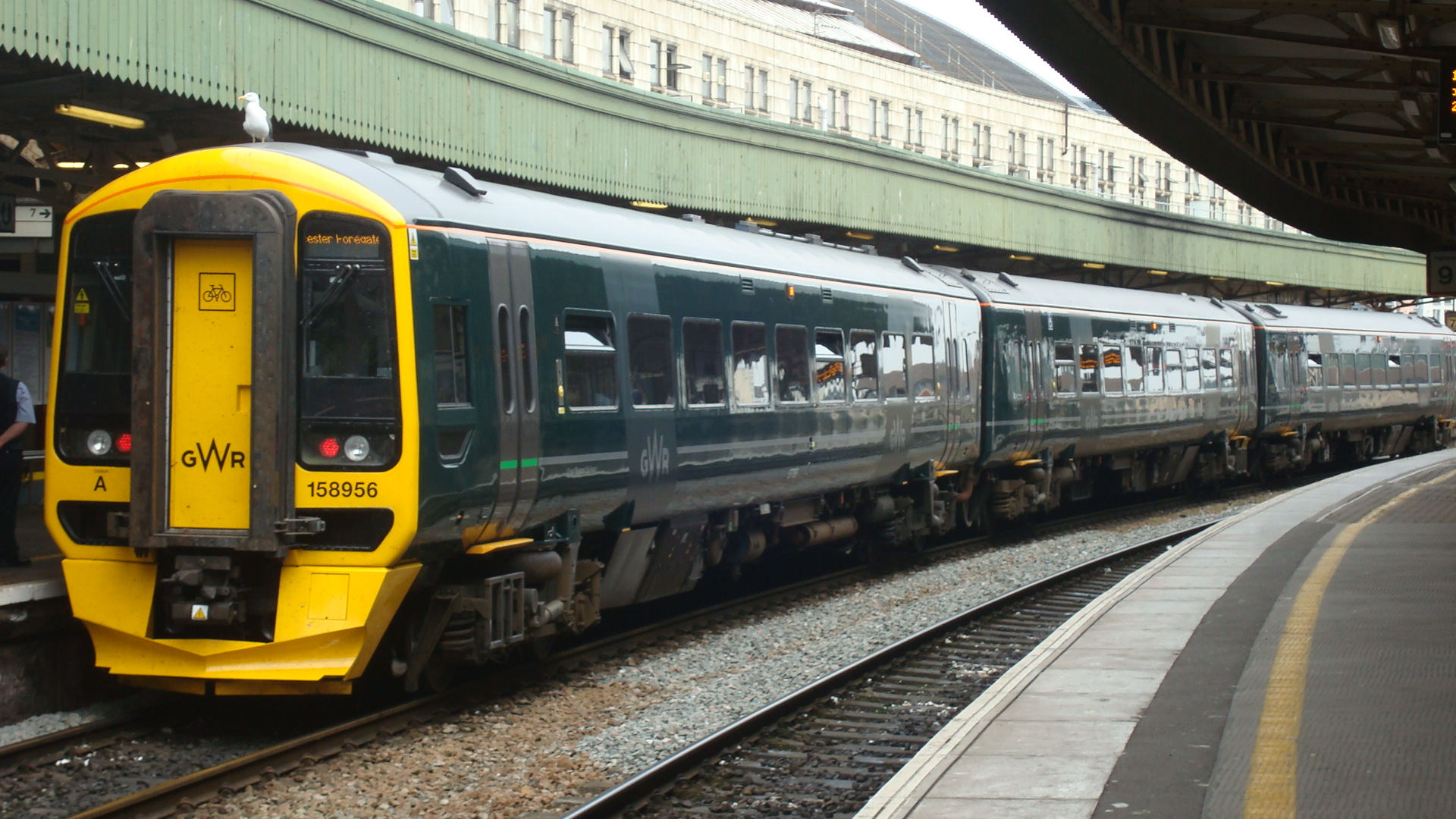
A Great Western Railway 158956 at Bristol Temple Meads

The Class 158 Express Sprinter units were built from 1989 to 1992 by BREL at Derby Litchurch Lane Works to replace elderly 'heritage' DMUs and locomotive-hauled passenger trains. Compared with previous Sprinter classes, specifically the venerable Class 156 Super Sprinter, the Class 158 is better suited to longer journeys with fewer stops, providing a quieter and more comfortable environment. They are fully air-conditioned (except the driver's cabs) with provision for a trolley refreshment service and an increased top speed of 90 mph (145 km/h). They feature medium density (2+2) seating in standard class and, on applicable examples, low density (2+1) seating in first class.

They are mostly fitted with Cummins engines, with the remaining 47 fitted with Perkins engines.

Currently operated by:

- East Midlands Railway
- Great Western Railway
- Northern Trains
- ScotRail
- South Western Railway
- Transport for Wales
- State Railway of Thailand: exported versions. Differences include inward opening slam doors rather than plug doors and 4 carriages, rather than 2 or 3 in the UK.

=== Class 159 South Western Turbo ===
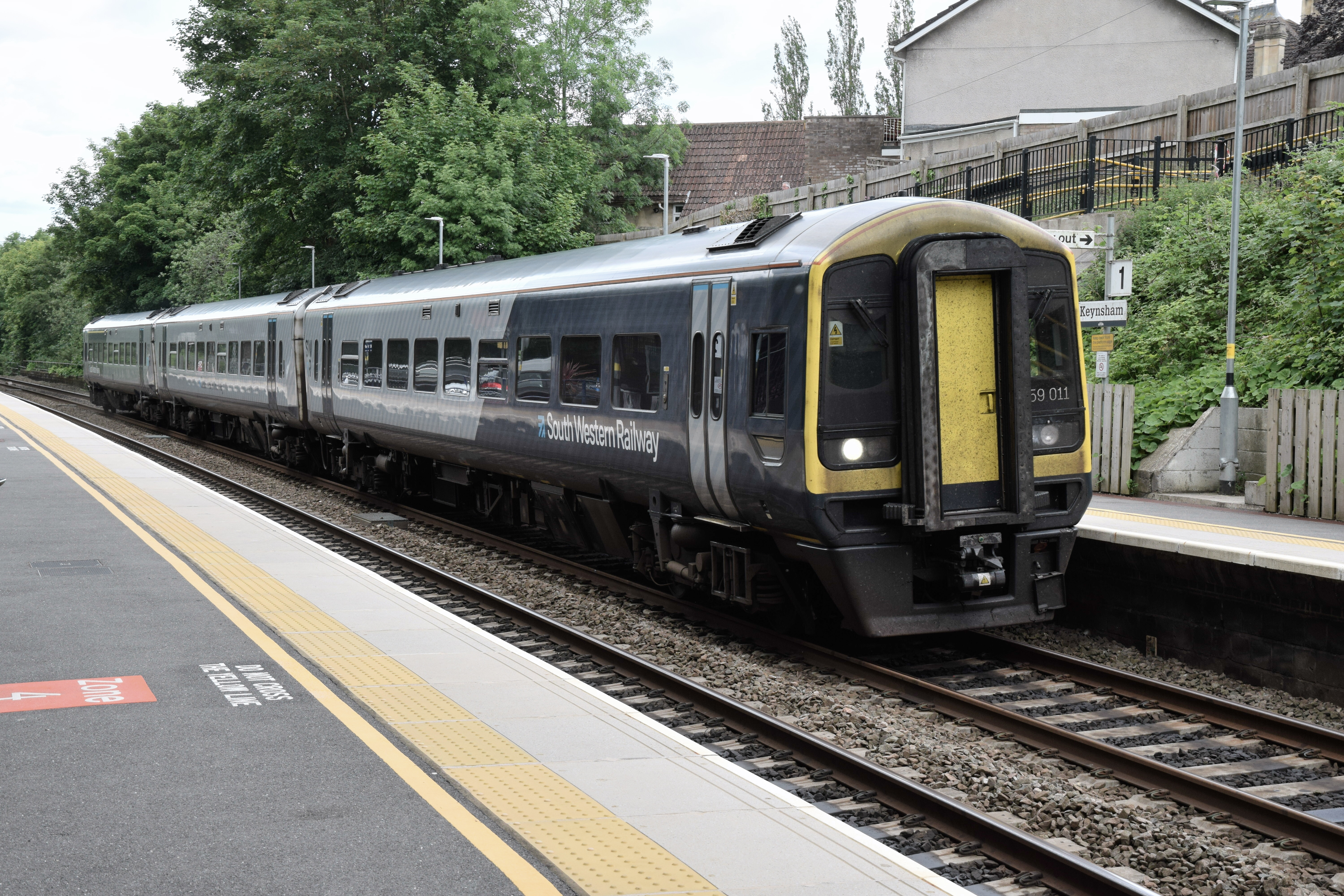
A South Western Railway Class 159 arriving at Keynsham

These 90 mph trains were originally built as three-car Class 158s, but converted before entry into service. Twenty-two three-car units were built for Network SouthEast's West of England Main Line and from London Waterloo to Salisbury, Yeovil Junction and Exeter St Davids. They were used to replace Class 47 and Class 50 locomotive-hauled passenger trains. Units tend to operate in six- or nine-coach formations between Waterloo and Salisbury, and in three or six coach formations between Salisbury and Exeter. South West Trains used to operate services from London Waterloo to Paignton, Plymouth and Penzance, but all services west of Exeter were withdrawn at the end of 2009.

Some surplus three coach Class 158 units, which were transferred to the West of England route in 2007, were refurbished to Class 159 standards and reclassified as Class 159/1s.

Currently operated by:

- South Western Railway.

== Proposed units ==
In addition to the production types, there were two types of Sprinter proposed that were, in the event, not proceeded with.

=== Class 152 Super Sprinter ===
In the early 1990s, as a cost saving measure on underused rural routes, British Rail proposed converting the two-car Class 156 into single car units, which were named as Class 152. Although the single car Sprinter did go ahead, it was eventually decided to convert most Class 155 units into the Class 153.

=== Class 157 Strathclyde Sprinter ===
In the 1990s, Strathclyde Passenger Transport was looking to update the fleet that was used to operate commuter and suburban services in and around Glasgow, with a new Sprinter type intended to be procured, which became Class 157. However, due to BR's financial limits at the time leading up to privatisation, these units were not ordered, with Class 170s eventually being procured.

== Variations ==
Class	Image	Operator	Introduced	Number	Carriages	End Gangways	Notes
150		Great Western Railway; London Northwestern Railway; Northern Trains; Transport for Wales	1984–87	137	2 (/1 & /2); 3 (/0 & /9)	No (/0 & /1); Yes (/2 & /9)	
151		Regional Railways	1985	2	3	No	Scrapped in 2004
152		Planned conversion of Class 156 to single car			1	Yes	Never built
153		ScotRail; Transport for Wales	1991–92	70	1	Yes	Converted from Class 155
154		Regional Railways	1985	1	2	No	Converted from and back to Class 150
155		Northern Trains	1987–88	42	2	Yes	35 units converted to Class 153
156		Northern Trains; ScotRail	1987–89	114	2	Yes	
157		Planned regional units			2	No	Never built
158		East Midlands Railway; Great Western Railway; Northern Trains; ScotRail; South Western Railway; Transport for Wales	1989–92	170	2 or 3	Yes	
159		South Western Railway	1989–93	30	3	Yes	
950		Network Rail	1985–86	1	2	No	Network Rail measurement unit
Thailand ASR		State Railway of Thailand	1990–91	12	3	Yes	Built to Thailand's metre gauge, based on the Class 158 Express Sprinter

== Replacement ==
As many Sprinters are approaching 40 years old, train operating companies are now replacing them. For example, London Midland decided to replace their Class 150 fleet with Class 172 from 2010.

Class 158s have been augmented or replaced by Class 170 and Class 175 units, allowing these to be cascaded to replace older Sprinters, which in turn replaced life-expired Pacer railbuses.

Class 158s still operate the journey from Norwich to Liverpool Lime Street, the Portsmouth Harbour to Cardiff Central and the Birmingham International to Holyhead journey, replacing Class 175 for use on other long-distance services.

Transport for Wales replaced its Class 150, 153 and 158 units with Class 197 trains.
