= British Rail Class 157 =

Proposed diesel multiple unit

British Rail Class 157 Strathclyde Sprinter
- Artist's impression of Class 157
- Manufacturer: Hunslet Transportation Projects; Holec Ridderkerk UK (Note: Hunslet Transportation Projects Limited (HTPL) sold its Birmingham-based design, engineering, and project management functions – including responsibility for the Class 157 and 323 contracts – to the Dutch electrical engineering firm Holec in March 1994.)
- Family name: Sprinter
- Replaced: First generation DMUs (planned)
- Number built: 21 (intended)
- Formation: 2 cars per unit (intended)
- Capacity: 156 seats (intended)
- Operators: British Rail (intended)

Specifications
- Engine type: Diesel (intended)
- Transmission: Hydraulic (intended)
- Braking system(s): Air/EP (intended)
- Safety system(s): AWS, TPWS (intended)
- Coupling system: BSI (intended)
- Track gauge: 1,435 mm (4 ft 8 1/2 in) standard gauge

Class 157 Strathclyde Sprinter was the designation applied to a range of diesel multiple unit trains of the Sprinter family which were planned for regional use in the United Kingdom. An order was placed in 1993 for 21 two-car units by Strathclyde Passenger Transport Executive, and further orders were expected. As well as the class number, British Rail reserved carriage numbers in the 526xx and 576xx series for these units.

As the privatisation of British Rail began, the intended use of the new trains in the Strathclyde area on a range of both existing and newly reopened routes was shelved, owing to the lack of funding available for the reopenings that had been specified by the local authorities. An additional issue was Hunslet's attempt to transfer its intellectual property rights over a number of its engineering designs to another company throughout 1994.

In the end, the order for the new trains was cancelled and due to this the Strathclyde Passenger Transport Executive ended up procuring a batch of Class 170 diesel multiple units instead.
