= British Rail Class 950 =

Class of 1 British diesel multiple unit

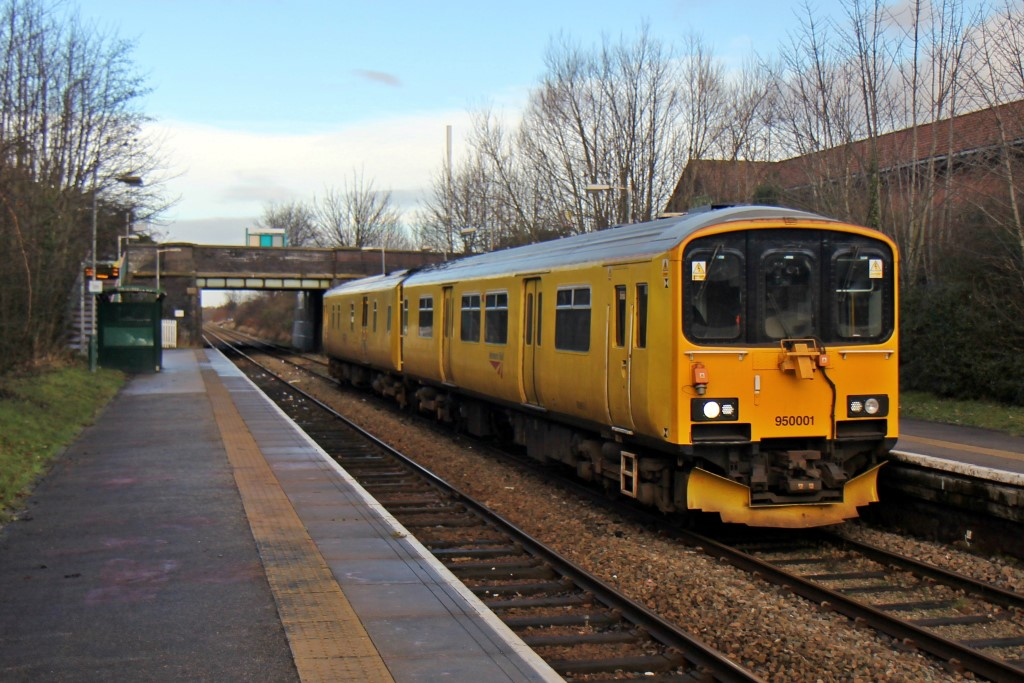
- Class 950 at Upton, Wirral in 2014
- Manufacturer: British Rail Engineering Limited
- Built at: Holgate Road Works, York
- Family name: Sprinter
- Constructed: 1987
- Number built: 1
- Formation: 2 cars: DM-DM
- Fleet numbers: Unit: 950001; Vehicles: 999600 and 999601
- Operator: Network Rail
- Depot: Railway Technical Centre (Derby)

Specifications
- Car body construction: Steel
- Car length: 19.930 m (65 ft 4.6 in)
- Width: 2.816 m (9 ft 2.9 in)
- Height: 3.774 m (12 ft 4.6 in)
- Maximum speed: 75 mph (121 km/h)
- Prime mover: 2 × Cummins NT855-R5 (one per vehicle)
- Engine type: Inline-6 4-stroke turbo-diesel
- Displacement: 14 L (855 cu in) per engine
- Power output: 213 kW (286 hp) per engine
- Transmission: Voith T 211 r (hydrokinetic)
- UIC classification: 2′B′+B′2′
- Braking system: Electro-pneumatic (tread)
- Track gauge: 1,435 mm (4 ft 8 1/2 in) standard gauge

The British Rail Class 950 is a diesel multiple unit that was purpose-built by British Rail Engineering Limited's Holgate Road carriage works for the British Rail Research Division for use as a track assessment unit. It is currently operated by Network Rail.

== Description ==
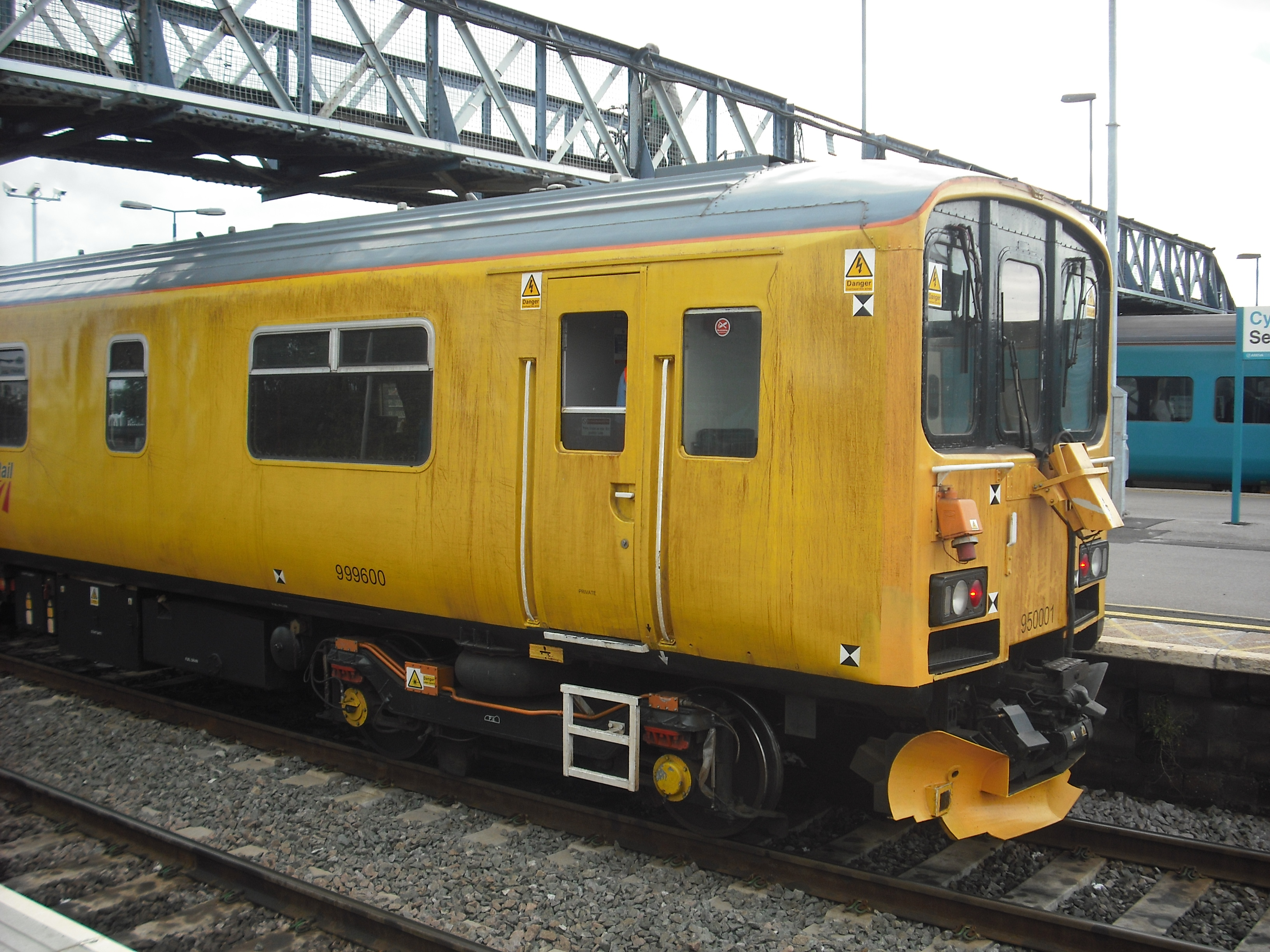
Cab of vehicle 999600, showing the video camera and laser measurement equipment.

It was built in 1987 using the same bodyshell as the Class 150/1 Sprinters. It was originally classified as a Class 180.

== Future ==
In December 2024, Network Rail announced that the unit would be withdrawn and disposed of, to be replaced by additional (modified) Class 153s.

== Fleet details ==
Class	Operator	Qty.	Year built	Cars per unit	Unit nos.	Notes
950	Network Rail	1	1987	2	950001	
