= British Rail Class 151 =

Prototype diesel multiple unit class (1985–89)

British Rail Class 151 Sprinter
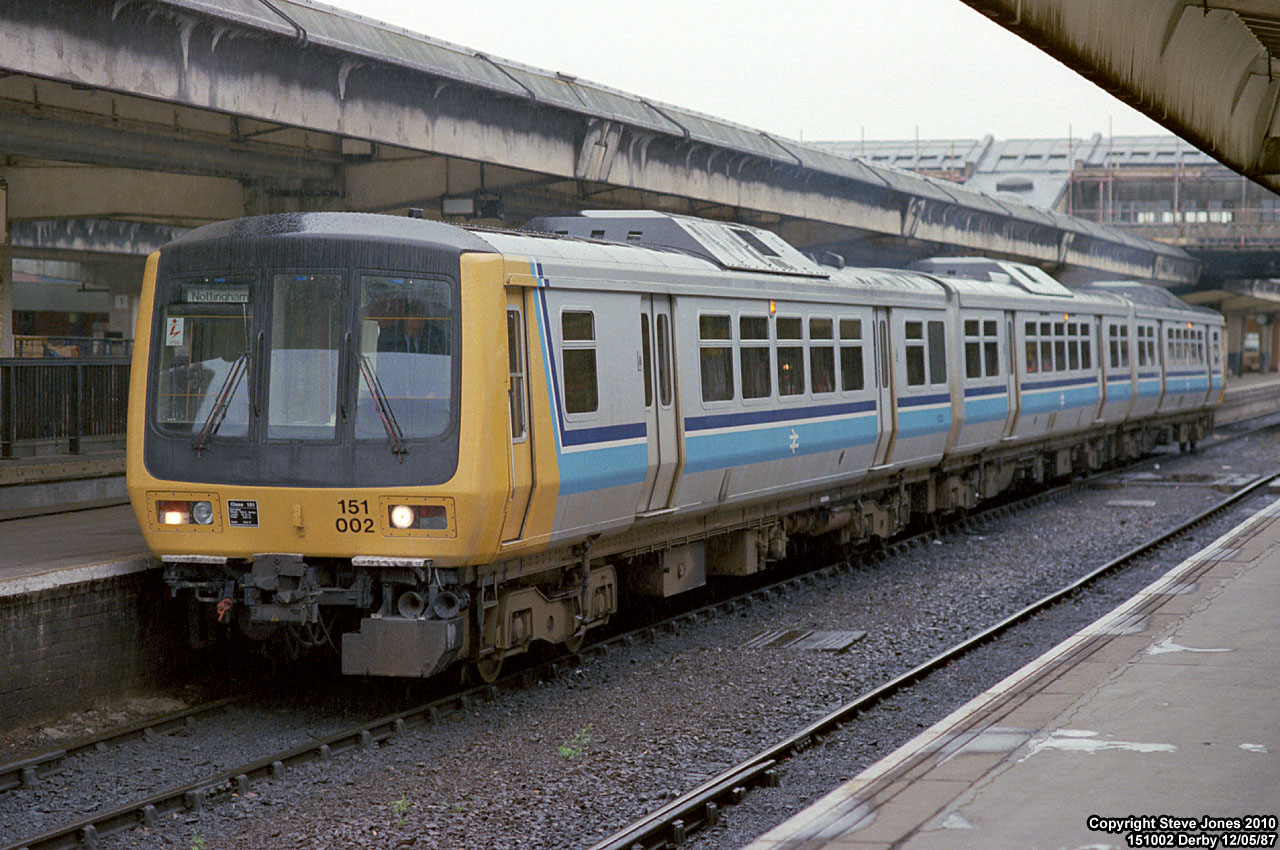
- A class 151 at Derby in 1987
- In service: 1985–1989
- Manufacturer: Metro-Cammell
- Order no.: 30987 (DMSL); 30988 (DMS); 30989 (MS)
- Built at: Washwood Heath, Birmingham
- Family name: Sprinter
- Replaced: BR First-Generation DMUs
- Constructed: 1985
- Entered service: 1985
- Scrapped: 2004
- Number built: 2
- Number scrapped: 2
- Formation: 3 cars per unit: DMSL-MS-DMS
- Diagram: DMSL vehicles: DP233; MS vehicles: DR204; DMS vehicles: DP232
- Fleet numbers: As built: 151001–151002; Post-1987: 151003–151004
- Capacity: 232 (total); 68 (DMSL); 84 (MS); 80 (DMS)
- Operators: Regional Railways
- Depots: Etches Park (Derby)

Specifications
- Car body construction: Aluminium
- Car length: DMS vehicles: 19.975 m (65 ft 6.4 in); MS vehicles: 19.600 m (64 ft 3.7 in)
- Width: 2.810 m (9 ft 2.6 in)
- Height: 3.845 m (12 ft 7.4 in)
- Floor height: 1.156 m (3 ft 9.5 in)
- Doors: Double-leaf pocket sliding
- Wheelbase: Bogies: 2.300 m (7 ft 6.6 in); Bogie centres: 14.040 m (46 ft 0.8 in)
- Maximum speed: 75 mph (121 km/h)
- Weight: DM vehicles: 32.4 tonnes (31.9 long tons; 35.7 short tons); MS vehicles: 32.1 tonnes (31.6 long tons; 35.4 short tons); Total: 96.9 tonnes (95.4 long tons; 106.8 short tons)
- Prime mover(s): 3 × Cummins NT855-R5 (one per vehicle)
- Engine type: Inline-6 4-stroke turbo-diesel
- Displacement: 14 L (855 cu in) per engine
- Power output: 638 kW (855 hp) total
- Transmission: Twin Disc 1330
- UIC classification: 2′B′+2′B′+B′2′
- Bogies: Metro-Cammell
- Braking system(s): Electro-pneumatic
- Coupling system: BSI
- Multiple working: Within class, and with Classes 14x and 15x
- Track gauge: 1,435 mm (4 ft 8 1/2 in) standard gauge

The British Rail Class 151 was a prototype class of diesel multiple unit (DMU) developed and constructed by the British railway equipment manufacturer Metro Cammell. It was designed primarily to serve as a successor to the earlier first-generation "Heritage" DMUs operated by the British Rail (BR).

Development of the Class 151 commenced during 1983 in response to a specification issued by BR calling for a new generation of DMU with which to equip its fleet. Both Metro Cammell and British Rail Engineering Limited (BREL) were selected to produce prototypes of their design submissions. Accordingly, a pair of 3-car units were constructed, which entered trial service with BR during 1985. If it had emerged successful, the Class 151 would have likely become the basis of Sprinter family of DMUs that were produced during the 1980s. However, following a competitive evaluation against the rival Class 150, the type did not secure a production contract, having lost out to its BREL-built rival. Both units were withdrawn during 1989 and, despite multiple vendors planning to restore them for service, they were ultimately scrapped.

== Background ==
By the beginning of the 1980s, British Rail (BR) operated a large fleet of first generation DMUs, which had been constructed in prior decades to various designs. While formulating its long-term strategy for this sector of its operations, British Rail planners recognised that there would be considerable costs incurred by undertaking refurbishment programmes necessary for the continued use of these aging multiple units, particularly due to the necessity of handling and removing hazardous materials such as asbestos. In light of the high costs involved in retention, planners examined the prospects for the development and introduction of a new generation of DMUs to succeed the first generation.

In the concept stage, two separate approaches were devised, one involving a so-called railbus that prioritised the minimisation of both initial (procurement) and ongoing (maintenance & operational) costs, while the second was a more substantial DMU that could deliver superior performance than the existing fleet, particularly when it came to long-distance services. The initial specification developed for the latter type was relatively ambitious for the era, calling for a maximum speed of 90 MPH (145 km/h), a rate of acceleration compatible to contemporary EMUs, the ability to couple/work in multiple with existing EMUs, facilitate through-access for passengers, feature pressure ventilation, the ability to assist another failed unit, and to comprise either a three or four-car consist.

This specification led to the development of the experimental British Rail Class 210 diesel-electric multiple unit. However, to deliver the performance specified, it was found that relatively expensive equipment had to be used, particularly to provide sufficient speed, acceleration, and through-passenger access; it also had maintainability problems due to space limitations. Despite these shortcomings, it was recognised that a production fleet that was assembled from proven components would possess both a greater reliability level and lower maintenance costs; it was forecast to achieve an availability rate of 85 per cent. As such, the type had sufficiently demonstrated a promising reduction in maintenance costs was achievable, especially once initial teething problems were dealt with, as well as the wider value represented by a new generation of DMUs in the reduction of ongoing costs for BR.

By 1983, experiences with the Class 210 had influenced planners to favour the procurement of a new generation of DMUs, but to also adopt a new set of specifications that were somewhat less demanding than the prior set. Specifically, it was decided to drop the top speed from 90 MPH to 75 MPH, as testing had revealed the higher rate to deliver no perceivable improvement in journey times due to the typically short spacing of the stations the type was intended to serve. Furthermore, it was determined that a propulsion system delivering 7 hp per tonne would deliver sufficient acceleration. The requests for compatibility with other rolling stock were eliminated, although auto-coupling and auto-connecting functionality was added. In addition to a good ride quality, the specification included a sound level of 90 dB when at full speed, an operational range of 1,000 miles, and an interval between major overhauls of five years or 350,000 miles.

In comparison to the prior generation of DMUs, which typically used a pair of engines for each power car, the new generation DMU would only use a single engine per car; sufficient cooling was also provided that even with one failed engine, a two-car unit could continue to perform typical services without incurring a major performance deficient. For an operational perspective, it was intended that the DMU could be assembled akin to building blocks, comprising between two and four cars that may or may not be outfitted with various passenger amenities such as toilets and luggage spaces.

Initially formalised as a business specification, these requirements were transferred into a relatively broad technical specification that avoided any specifics other than those that were deemed essential for compatibility purposes. Thereafter, it was issued to various rolling stock manufacturers for a competitive tender. As a part of this process, these manufacturers submitted bids to construct an initial series of three-car prototypes as demonstration units. A relatively constrained timetable of only 18 months between the date of order to delivery of these prototypes was also specified; this has been attributed as having restricted manufacturers to overwhelming lean towards existing industrial practices for their submissions.

In response to the specification, several submissions were received by BR. The railway engineering company Metro-Cammell opted to bid its own design to meet the requirement. A rival bid was also submitted by British Rail Engineering Limited (BREL) that was heavily based on its successful Class 455 EMU, sharing its body and the majority of its running gear. BR officials quickly opted to proceed with a pair of prototypes from both BREL and Metro-Cammell, issuing orders to these manufacturers henceforth.

== Design ==
The Class 151 comprised an aluminium-body that was principally rivetted together; this feature was attributed as enabling a meaningful reduction in weight of 3.7 tonnes over conventional construction methods. The type was designed to achieve a maximum speed of 75 mph (120 km/h), and was capable of attaining a relatively high rate of acceleration, being aided in this latter aspect by their lightweight construction.

Each car was furnished with a single Cummins NT855-R5 turbo-diesel engine that produced 213 kW (285 hp). Each engine drove a hot-shift Twin Disc transmission, which in turn powered the axles of one bogie on each car via a Cardan shaft and Gmeinder final drive units. Gear changes were controlled by a microprocessor, the software of which being adjustable to change or improve its behaviour and characteristics. Unusually, the torque converter was attached to the engine rather than the gearbox itself. Overall, the transmission system was observed to be particularly unique for the time. During testing, the gearboxes proved to have some issues, with the clutch itself being identified as being the primary source of these issues. While the performance was greatly improved with modifications, particularly the installation of a clutch composed of different materials, the noticeably rough gearshift process was never entirely resolved.

Other uncommon features of the Class 151 include its use of hydraulically-driven alternators and cooling fans. The main cooler group and radiators were fitted in a pod on the roof of each vehicle. The bogies were of a non-standard design; they exhibited a relatively high pitch frequency of 12 Hz, which opposed the BR convention of lower bogie frequencies and higher body frequencies, causing concern amongst BR staff. As a consequence of their non-standard nature, it was difficult to acquire support and spares for the bogies and several other unique features present on the units, a factor which allegedly heavily contributed to their withdrawal in 1989. There were proposals to fit standard Class 150 bogies; however, this refit ultimately proved to be impractical.

== Operations ==
In accordance with BR's order, a pair of 3-car units were constructed and entered trial service with the operator during 1985. These trials were not an isolated affair but performed as a competitive evaluation against the rival BREL-built Class 150; this evaluation was particularly important to the future of either type as whichever proved to possess superior qualities would therefore be likely receive a production contract.

During the trial, members of the public praised the Class 151 for its favourable ride quality; although some vibration was experienced on older sections of jointed track. The noise levels of both the Class 151 and its Class 150 rival were determined to be adequate for its intended service sector, but noted to likely pose an issue if directed towards the higher end of the market. Concerns regarding the body bending frequency of the Class 151 did not prove to have major substance to them throughout the trials. One shortcoming that was observed of the type was the frequent occurrence of rough/jerky shifts by the transmission, which often sent violent shocks throughout the train. While some modifications were made to improve the gearbox, the shifting issue were not fully rectified until a modified version of the transmission appeared some years later on the Class 154; however, interest in the Class 151 or the hot-shift gearbox had evaporated by that point.

Ultimately, the production contract was awarded to the rival Class 150, which accordingly went into quantity production throughout the mid-1980s. Both of the Class 151 prototypes continued in revenue service with BR for a number of years before being permanently withdrawn during 1989. For a time, these units were temporarily stored at Llandudno Junction carriage sheds until they were both purchased by Railtest (later Serco Railtest) who had planned to convert them into test units. However, for the same reasons which saw their withdrawal from service, Railtest did not go ahead with any conversions and the units were again stored out in the open in the sidings of the Railway Technical Centre, Derby.

In March 2000, the units were acquired by a company called Endeavour Rail, who planned to refurbish both for spot hire to train operating companies. They were transferred to LNWR at Crewe, but again the proposed refurbishment did not happen and the units remained in the open next to the West Coast Main Line where they would remain until scrapped on site in 2004, by which point their condition had rapidly deteriorated in part due to vandalism.

== Formation ==
Unit Number	DMSL (68S seats)	MS (84S seats)	DMS (80S seats)
151001 (151003)	55202	55402	55302
151002 (151004)	55203	55403	55303
