= Derby Etches Park =

Railway depot in Derby, England

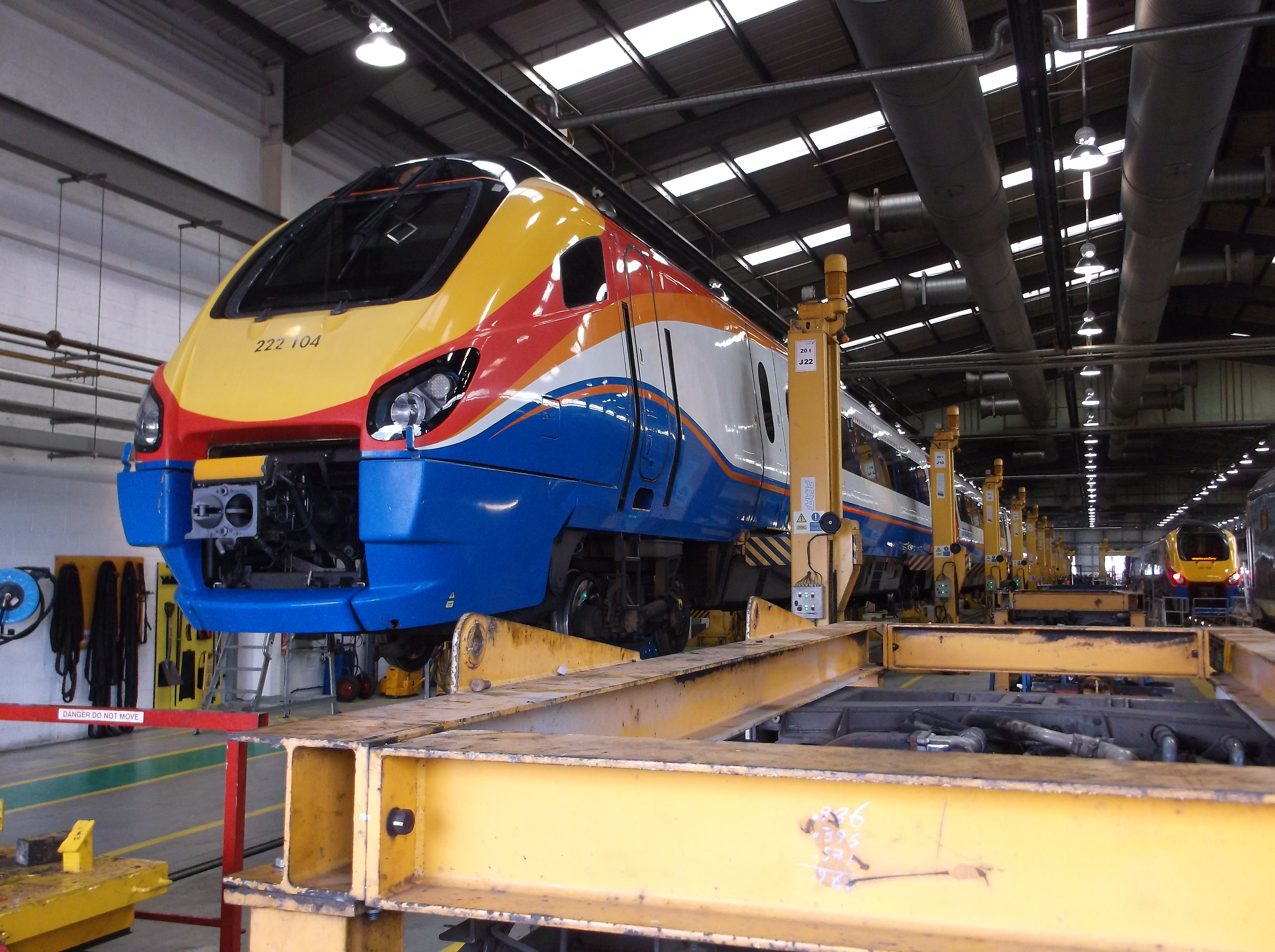
- A Class 222 on jacks at Etches Park depot
- Interactive map of Derby Etches Park

Location
- Location: Derby, Derbyshire, United Kingdom
- Coordinates: 52.9102°N 1.4539°W
- OS grid: SK367349

Characteristics
- Owner: East Midlands Railway
- Depot code: EP (1973-1975); DY (1975-)
- Type: DMU, HST

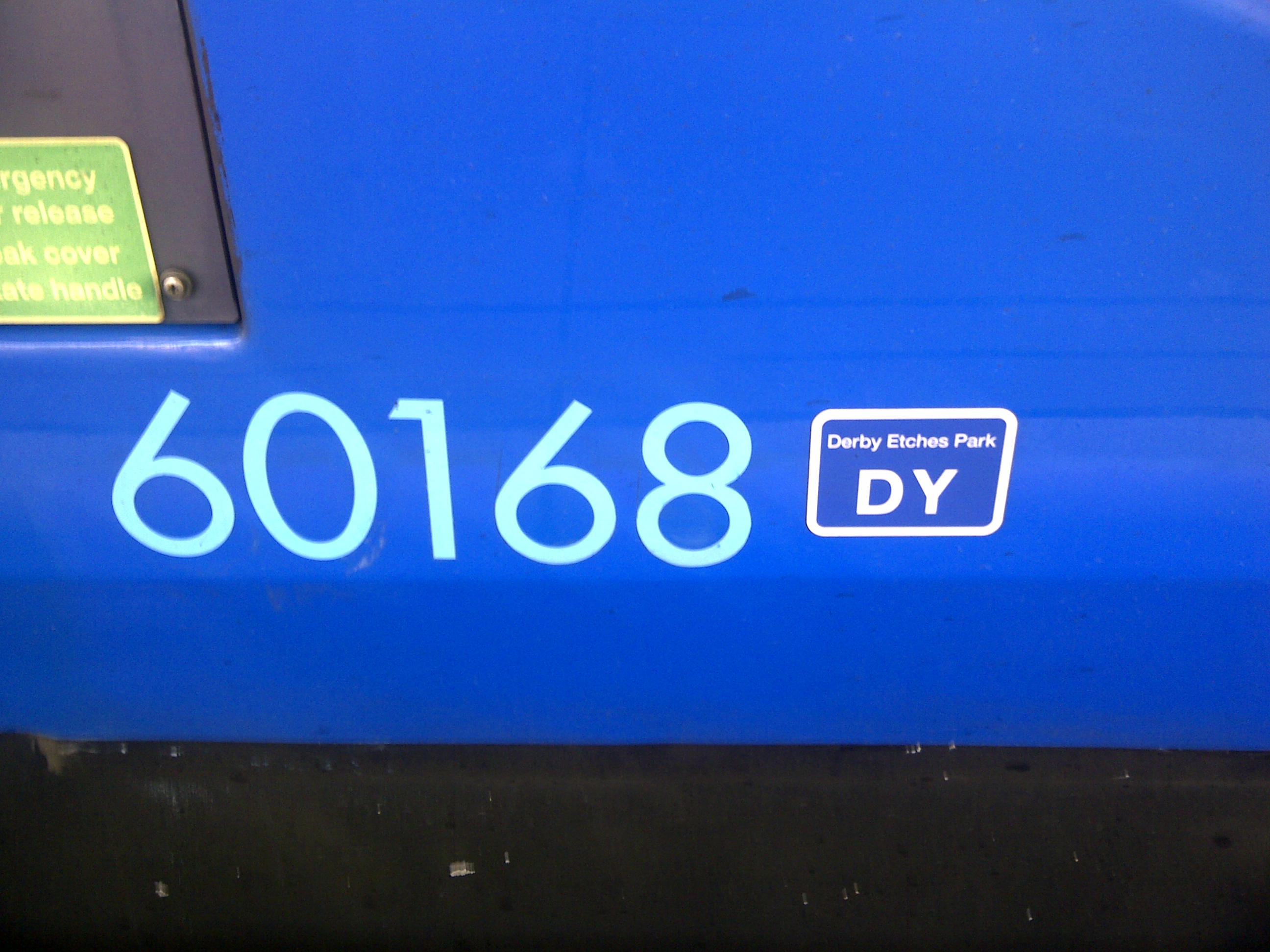
Derby Etches Park Depot Sticker on Class 222 Meridian No. 222008

Derby Etches Park is a railway traction and rolling stock maintenance depot (T&RSMD) operated by East Midlands Railway, and situated in Derby, England. The depot is located to the east of Derby railway station. InterCity and Diesel Multiple Unit (DMU) trains are serviced and maintained here. The depot code is DY.

== History ==
In 2022, work began to upgrade the depot to accommodate the incoming Class 810 trains.

== Allocation ==
Stock that is allocated and maintained at Derby Etches Park are the East Midlands Railway Class 222, East Midlands Railway also stable Class 170s and Class 158s at Derby Etches Park, although these are maintained and allocated at Nottingham Eastcroft depot. There is a British Rail Class 08 Diesel Locomotive Shunter in operation.

Around 1968, the depot managed a fleet of British Rail Class 105 diesel multiple units, which received maintenance at Derby Etches Park every 1,250-1,500 miles. These were eventually transferred to Newton Heath TMD and were replaced by British Rail Class 120s from Western Region of British Railways.

In 1987, the depot's allocation of rolling stock also included Class 08 shunters. Classes 150, 151 and 154 DMUs, and coaching stock were also allocated at that time. Maintenance was also undertaken for the HQ-allocated stock of the Railway Technical Centre.
