= Cummins UK =

UK diesel engine manufacturer

Cummins UK is a diesel engine manufacturer and the Cummins US distributor for the UK and Ireland. Cummins Inc. is a corporation of complementary business units that design, manufacture, distribute and service engines and related technologies, including fuel systems, controls, air handling, filtration, emission solutions and electrical power generation systems. Headquartered in Columbus, Indiana, (US) Cummins serves customers in approximately 190 countries and territories through a network of more than 500 company-owned and independent distributor locations and approximately 5,200 dealer locations.

== Cummins UK ==
The first manufacturing facility outside of the United States was opened at Shotts in Scotland in 1956, it was known as Cummins Engine Company Ltd. Cummins occupied "the Wrens Nest" textile factory where diesel engines were manufactured. Taking advantage of the presence of a nearby Euclid earthmover plant, dependent on Cummins engines, they began building the NH series diesel engines. Part of this plant still exists today in the form of Linden International. The Scottish Cummins factory was largely successful but closed in March 1998, with its operations being consolidated to the Cummins' manufacturing facility at Darlington. The Darlington plant, built in partnership with Chrysler International, had first opened in 1964 specifically to build the V6/V8 "Vim-Vine-Vale" engine series. While this engine flopped in the UK, exports (mainly to Mexico's DINA) kept the plant profitable. The Daventry plant came on line in 1972 to build the K-series and other heavy industrial engines.

Cummins UK originally mostly sold larger, premium diesel engines in the UK - with the first British-built Cummins diesel going on to power the Seddon truck carrying Donald Campbell's Bluebird K7 racing boat. Cummins then gradually expanded downwards, with the 10 litre L10 engine in 1982 and the 3.9 to 5.9 litre B-series arriving in 1986. The Cummins branding throughout the UK and the world has gone through many changes over the years; going from Cummins blue to the current red, white and black branding. All Cummins branding decisions are made at a corporate level from the central headquarters in Columbus, Indiana, and then rolled throughout all Cummins distributors around the world. In 1986 the business of Self-Changing Gears was purchased.

Cummins UK is the distributor for UK and Ireland; but it wasn't always known by this name. Cummins Diesel Sales & Service Limited was owned by Blackwood Hodge CDS&S, operating out of Blackwood Hodge, UK. It was acquired by Cummins Inc and renamed Cummins Diesel in 1984, before having its name changed to Cummins UK in 2004. This was the case for many Blackwood Hodge operations throughout the world, for example in Australia.

Cummins UK currently has eight service centres across the UK and Ireland, with its Irish facility based in Dublin and its central parts warehouse based at its headquarters in Wellingborough at Park Farm Industrial Estate.

Just after 2004 Cummins UK changed the way it operated, moving all stock (apart from some fast moving parts) out of its branches and into its headquarters in Wellingborough.

== Engines ==
Cummins diesel engines were traditionally fire engine red and are still red today in many of its market sectors. Green engines tend to be used in power generation, and black in the marine division. The red engines are a popular feature in many buses and coaches on the roads. Many Cummins engines are manufactured in one of two Cummins manufacturing facilities in the UK, in Darlington and Daventry. The engines are then prepared for the UK market and also for worldwide distribution. Together these two facilities employ a large number of engineers and Cummins is one of the largest employers in Daventry.

The range of engines that Cummins UK service include Cummins B Series engine, Cummins C Series engine, Cummins M Series engine and Cummins L Series engine and others.

Cummins UK sells engines to various markets, including buses and trucks.

== Markets ==
Cummins UK supplies engines and products to a variety of different market sectors including agricultural, bus & coach, construction, industrial, marine, military, mining, power generation, rail and truck.

Business operations are based at the headquarters in Wellingborough. Cummins UK are also the sole distributor for Cummins Onan generators for the Marine Industry in the UK and Ireland. One of the largest divisions in Cummins UK is the Power Generation division. They provide essential power via generator sets to hospitals, shopping centres and other major business.

== Customers and product distribution ==
Cummins UK customers fall into various sectors, including end users, rental companies, dealers, OEMs, and export houses amongst others.

The business sells its products either directly to its customers or via one of over 100 key dealers throughout the UK and Ireland. These are chosen via a detailed selection process and then certified to become a Cummins dealer, with the certification process specified by the worldwide headquarters in the US.

== Alleged arms embargo violations ==
In 2025, two dossiers dating from presented by the Sudanese government documented evidence that engines made by Cummins UK were seen in the Edge Group (a United Arab Emirati's company) manufactured Nimr APC vehicles that were found in RSF sites. Back in 2013, the UN security council found that their engines have also been found in the UAE-manufactured vehicles in embargoed countries such as Libya. The company responded by saying they investigated past transactions and did not see any that showed Sudan as the end-use destination.
