= Salisbury rail crash =

Salisbury rail crash may refer to:

- 1906 Salisbury rail crash, speeding, killed 28 people
- 2021 Salisbury rail crash, poor rail adhesion, driver error
