= Nottingham Eastcroft =

Light maintenance depot in Nottingham, Nottinghamshire

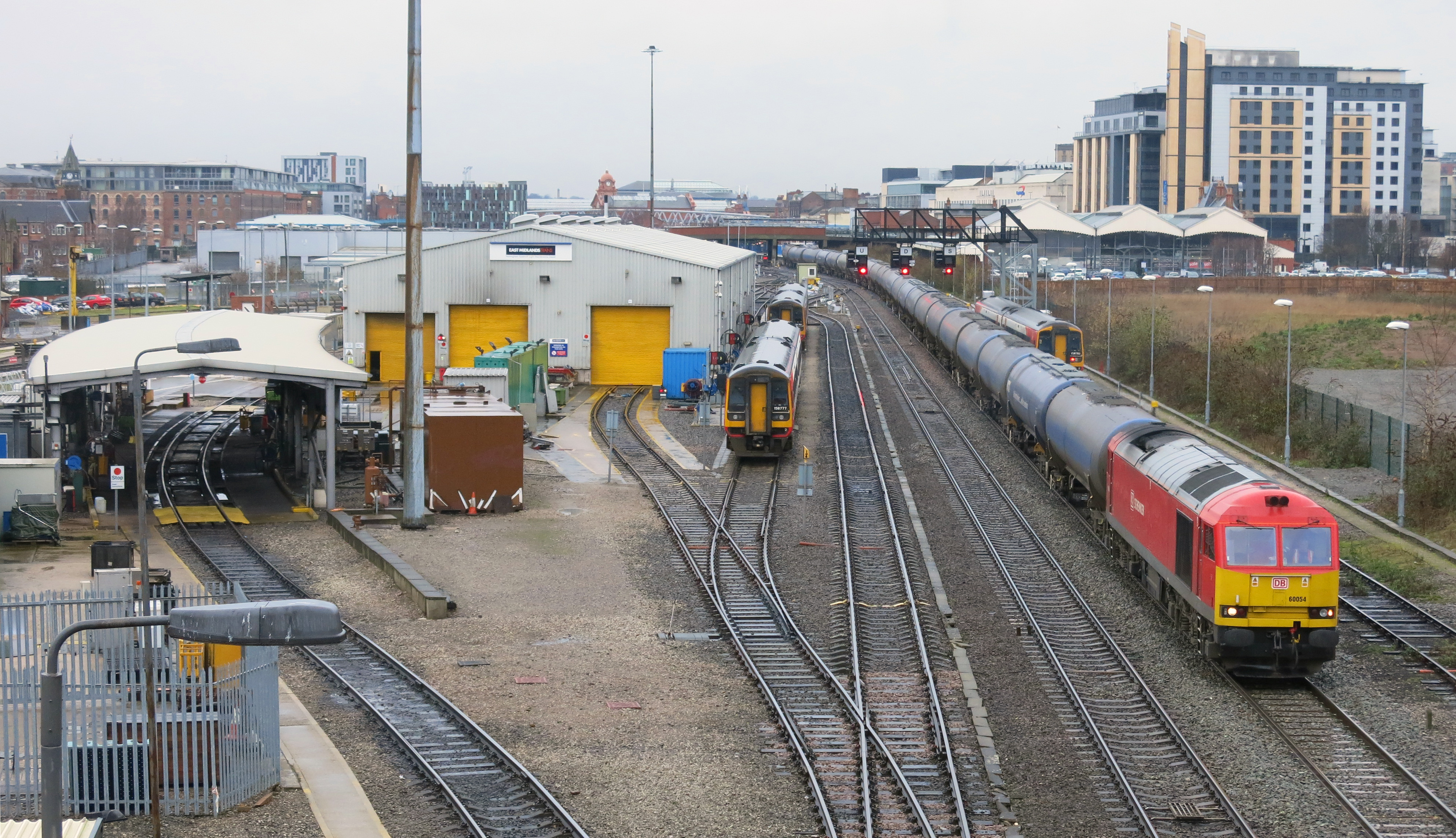
- Class 60 with empty oil tanks passing Nottingham Eastcroft Stabling Point. Around are three Class 158 DMUs.
- Interactive map of Nottingham Eastcroft

Location
- Location: Nottingham, Nottinghamshire
- Coordinates: 52.9472°N 1.136°W
- OS grid: SK581392

Characteristics
- Owner: East Midlands Railway
- Depot code: NM (1973 -)
- Type: DMU

History
- Former depot code: 16A (1948 - September 1963) 16D (September 1963 - November 1967)

Nottingham Eastcroft is a light maintenance depot located in Nottingham, Nottinghamshire, England. The carriage sidings are located near Nottingham station and are situated alongside the former Midland Railway line to Lincoln.

There has been a carriage shed on the site since at least 1899. On 8 May 1941 the Eastcroft carriage shed was hit by a bomb, completely wrecking it.

The depot code is NM.

== Present ==
As of 2023, East Midlands Railway Class 158 Express Sprinters are allocated and maintained here. The Class 170 Turbostars are maintained as well, but not allocated. A £2 million upgrade to the depot was completed in 2022, increasing the capacity and modernising the fuelling facilities.

Also present at Eastcroft is Boden Rail who maintain Class 37, Class 56 and Class 70 locomotives for Colas Rail.
