= British Rail Class 159 =

British class of diesel multiple unit trains

British Rail Class 159 South Western Turbo
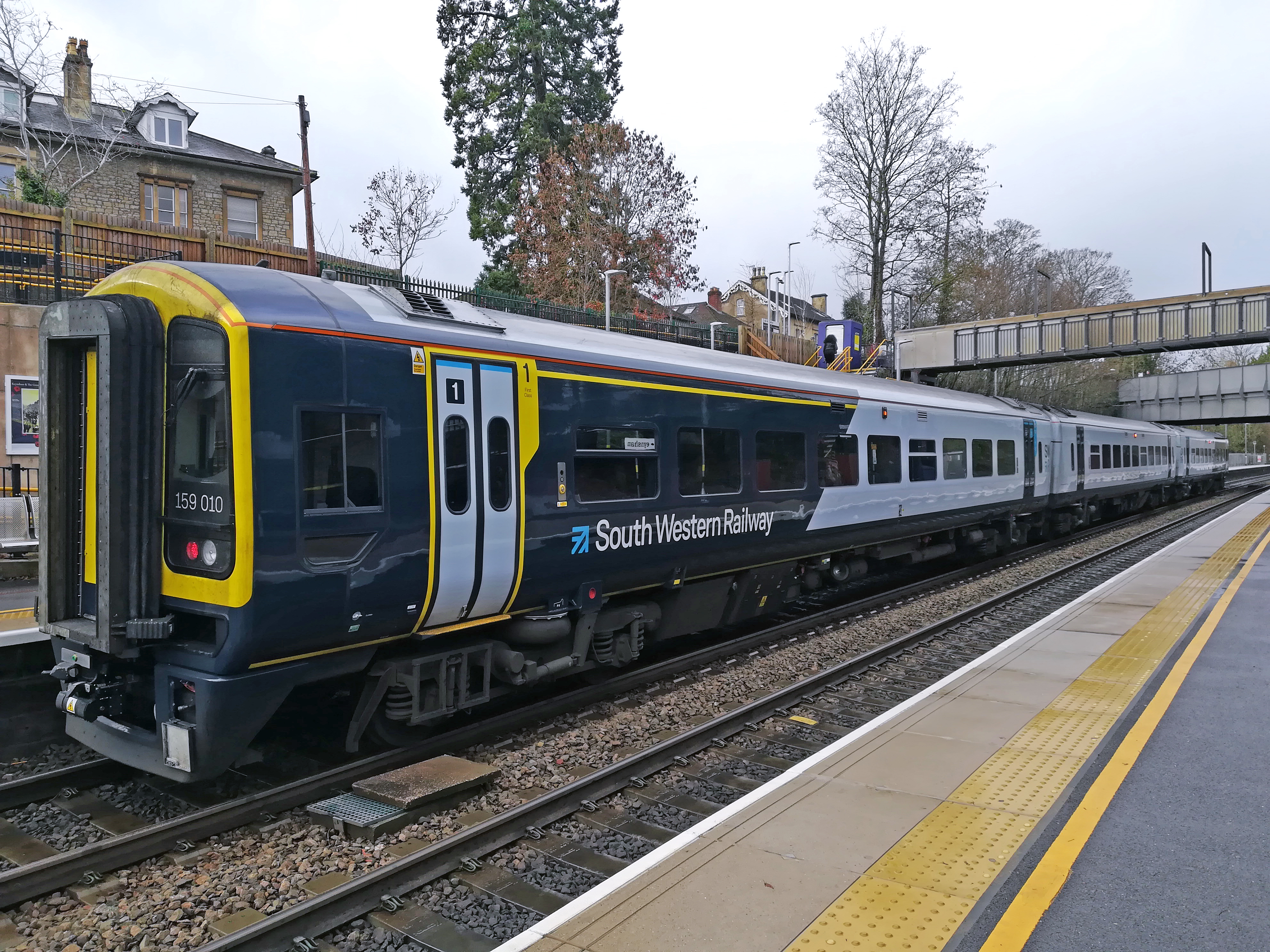
- A South Western Railway Class 159 in 2018

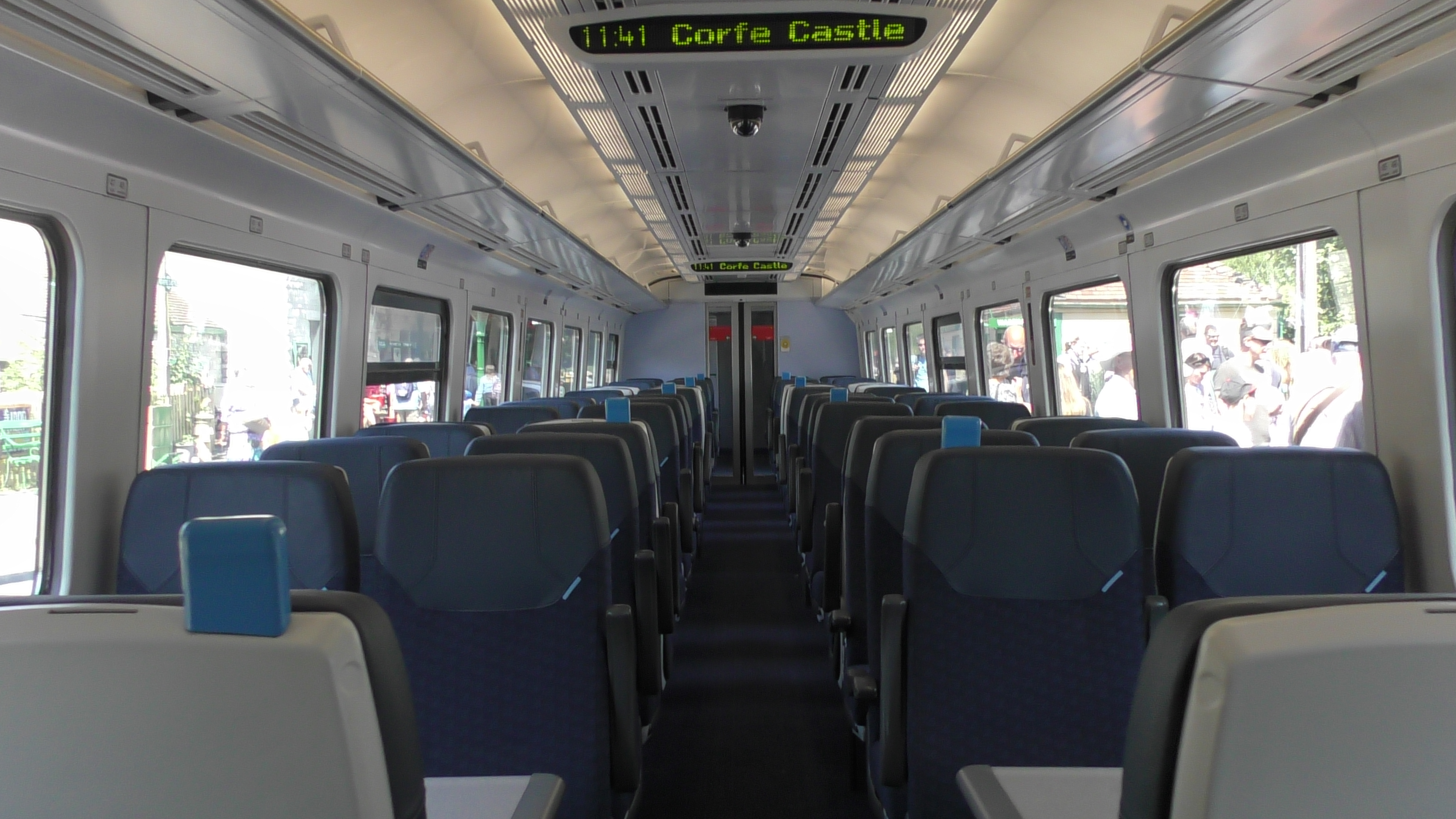
- Standard-class interior, as refreshed by SWR
- In service: 10 June 1993 – present
- Manufacturer: British Rail Engineering Limited
- Built at: Derby Litchurch Lane Works
- Family name: Sprinter
- Replaced: Locomotive-hauled trains
- Constructed: 159/0: 1992–1993; 159/1: 1989–1992
- Refurbished: 2000–2001 (159/0 units only); 2007–2008 (all units)
- Number built: 22 (plus 8 converted from Class 158)
- Number in service: 29
- Number scrapped: 2 vehicles
- Formation: 3 cars per unit: DMCL-MSL-DMSL
- Fleet numbers: 159/0: 159001–159022; 159/1: 159101, 159103-159108
- Capacity: 169 seats (23 first-class, 146 standard)
- Owner: Porterbrook
- Operator: South Western Railway
- Depot: Salisbury
- Line served: West of England Main Line

Specifications
- Car body construction: Welded aluminium
- Car length: 22.57 m (74 ft 1 in)
- Width: 2.70 m (8 ft 10 in)
- Height: 3.73 m (12 ft 3 in)
- Doors: Double-leaf plug (2 per side per car)
- Maximum speed: 90 mph (145 km/h)
- Weight: approx. 38.5 t (38 long tons; 42 short tons) per car
- Axle load: Route Availability 1
- Prime movers: 159/0 units: 3 × Cummins NTA855-R3; 159/1 units: 3 × Cummins NTA855-R1; (one per car)
- Engine type: Inline-6 4-stroke turbo-diesel
- Displacement: 14 L (855 cu in) per engine
- Power output: 159/0: 895 kW (1,200 hp); 159/1: 783 kW (1,050 hp); (total)
- Transmission: Voith T 211 rz (hydrokinetic)
- UIC classification: 2′B′+B′2′+B′2′
- Bogies: Powered: BREL P4-4; Unpowered: BREL T4-4
- Braking system: Pneumatic (disc)
- Safety systems: AWS; TPWS
- Coupling system: BSI
- Multiple working: Within class and with Classes 14x, 15x and 170
- Track gauge: 1,435 mm (4 ft 8 1/2 in) standard gauge

The British Rail Class 159 is a class of diesel multiple unit (DMU) passenger trains of the Sprinter grouping, built in 1989–1992 by British Rail Engineering Limited (BREL)'s Derby Litchurch Lane Works as Class 158. Before entering traffic, the original 22 units were modified at Rosyth Dockyard to Class 159 to operate services on the West of England Main Line, replacing various locomotive-hauled passenger trains. The units were originally branded by Network SouthEast as South Western Turbo.

== History and design ==
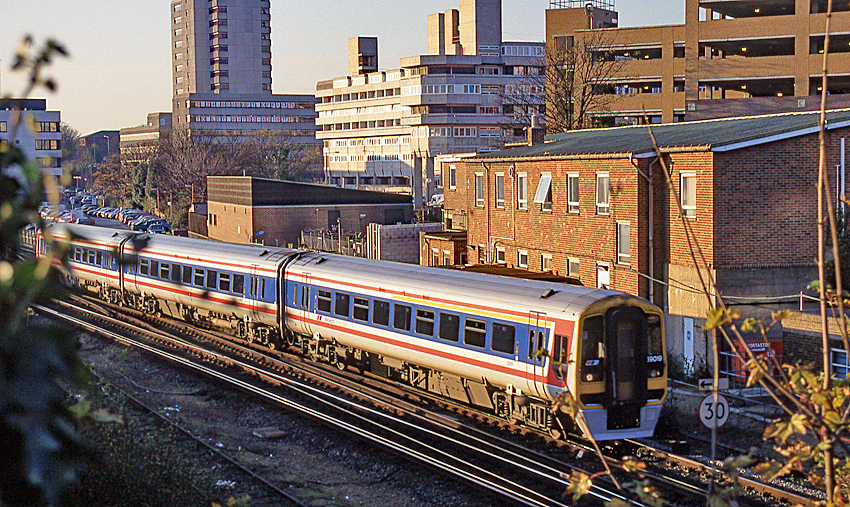
Class 159 unit in Network SouthEast livery departing from Southampton (1996)

In the late 1980s, the locomotive-hauled stock on Network SouthEast's (NSE) West of England route from London Waterloo to Salisbury, Yeovil Junction and Exeter St Davids was in urgent need of replacement. The Class 50 diesel locomotives were not suited to the stop-start nature of the route and frequently broke down. A single breakdown could cause chaos because of the long sections of single track west of Salisbury, following the Beeching cuts.

Various options were considered, including electrification, shortened HSTs, construction of new locomotives and stock (a passenger version of the proposed Class 48), or the proposed Class 171 (which would have been part of the Networker, an inter-city version of the Class 165 – not to be confused with the later Turbostars. A study found the best options were electrification or new DMUs.

With the UK economy in decline in the early 1990s, it was found that Regional Railways had over-ordered Class 158s, at the same time as NSE was looking for a similar number of new diesel trains. NSE agreed to take on the surplus Class 158s.

The original 22 units were built as Class 158 units, but were rebuilt by Babcock Rail in Rosyth Dockyard before entering traffic. This entailed fitting first-class accommodation and retention toilets, and various other modifications. The rebuild was required because it was not possible for Network SouthEast and the newly-privatised BREL to agree terms on the variation order to NSE specification.

The first unit (159004) was handed over to NSE on 6 January 1993.

The units converted to Class 159 specification during construction are numbered 159001–159022, with individual vehicles numbered 57873–57894 for driving motor vehicles and 58718–58739 for intermediate motor vehicles. The class is maintained at a purpose-built depot at Salisbury.

In 2007, eight further Class 159 units were created through the rebuilding of surplus Class 158 units displaced from the TransPennine Express franchise.

The units feature BSI couplers, which enables them to work in multiple with other units from the same class, but also Class 170 and the classes of the Pacer and Sprinter groupings.

== Accidents and incidents ==
- On 4 January 2010, Class 142 DMU 142029 collided with a train composed of two Class 159 units at Exeter St Davids. Nine people were injured.
- On 31 October 2021, South Western Railway Class 159 unit 159102 collided with a Great Western Railway Class 158 train at Fisherton tunnel in Salisbury. As a result of the damage caused following the incident, two carriages of 159102 (vehicles 57803 and 58703) were written off and scrapped.

== Operations ==
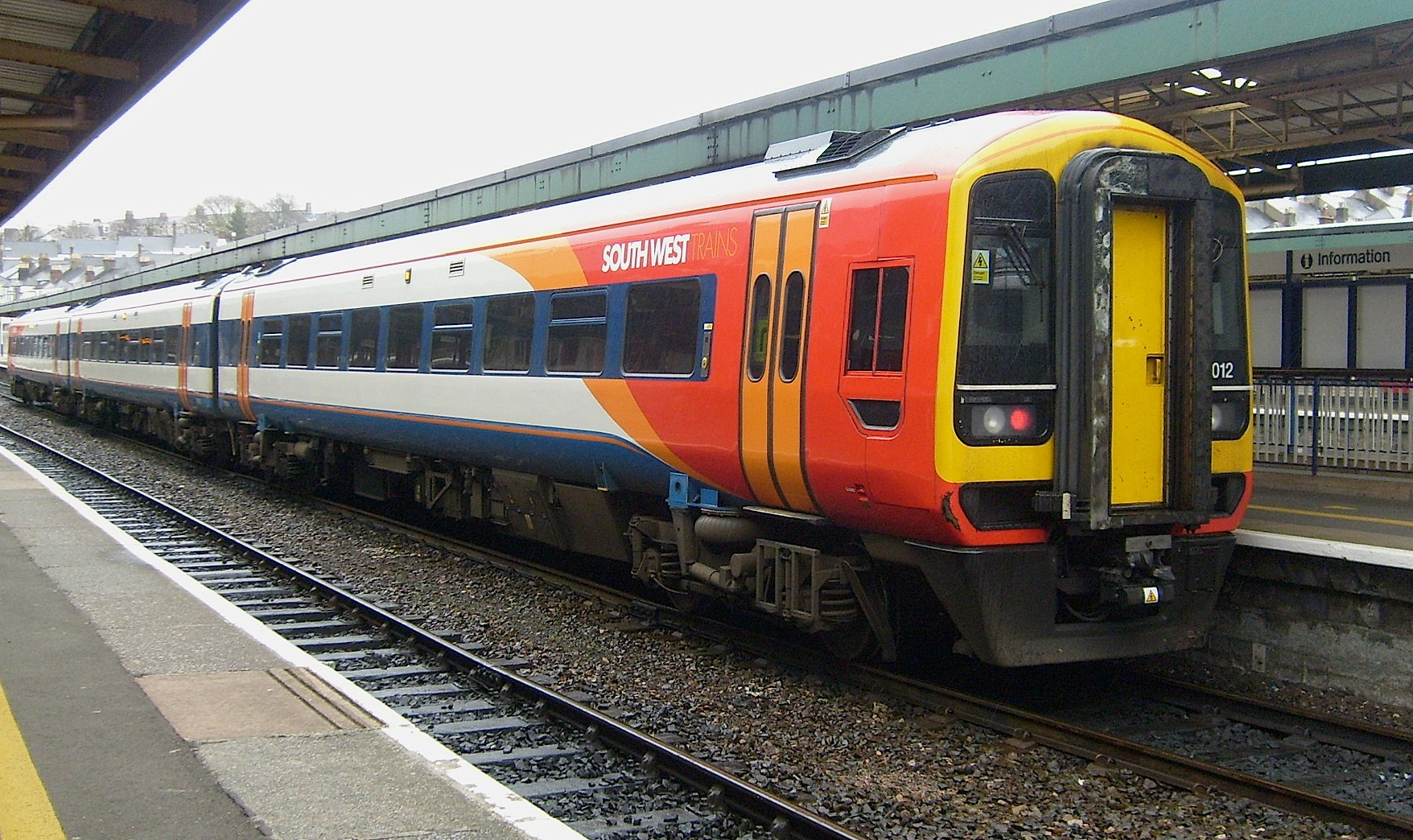
A refurbished Class 159/0 No. 159012 at Plymouth

The units were dedicated to the West of England sector of Network SouthEast, operating services between London Waterloo and Exeter; they also worked services between Salisbury and Southampton Central, and on the Reading to Basingstoke line to replace elderly diesel-electric multiple units. They then transferred to the South West Trains shadow franchise in readiness for privatisation.

Upon the privatisation of British Rail, the West of England route passed to the South West franchise in 1996, which was won by the Stagecoach Group. Starting in 2000, units were progressively refurbished and repainted from NSE's blue, red and white livery into South West Trains' express livery. Other post-privatisation modifications included clearer LED destination displays, upgraded air-conditioning and more openable windows.

Currently, the Class 159s operate mainly from London Waterloo to Salisbury/Exeter in formations of six, eight, or nine coaches (2 × Class 159, 2 × 159 plus 1 × 158, or 3 × 159 respectively) and between Salisbury and Exeter in three- or six-coach formations. Until the December 2009 timetable change, some trains continued beyond Exeter to Paignton, Plymouth and Penzance; these usually operated as three-coach units, though at weekends there were some six-coach formations. These services are now operated by Great Western Railway. The service to Bristol Temple Meads is now also operated by Class 159s.

A class 159/0 at Platform 1 in Exeter St Davids No. 159001

Since 2006, the original Class 159 fleet of 22 has been supplemented by eight three-coach Class 158s (renumbered into the 159/1 series) and 11 two-coach versions. The decision to standardise on 158s and 159s allowed the nine Class 170 Turbostar units to be transferred to other operators: eight went to First TransPennine Express, with the remaining unit going to Southern for integration into Class 171 Turbostars.

=== Routes served ===
These trains serve the following routes:

- London Waterloo to Basingstoke, Salisbury and Exeter St Davids, via Yeovil Junction
- London Waterloo and Salisbury to Yeovil Pen Mill, via Westbury or Yeovil Junction.

== Refurbishments and conversions ==
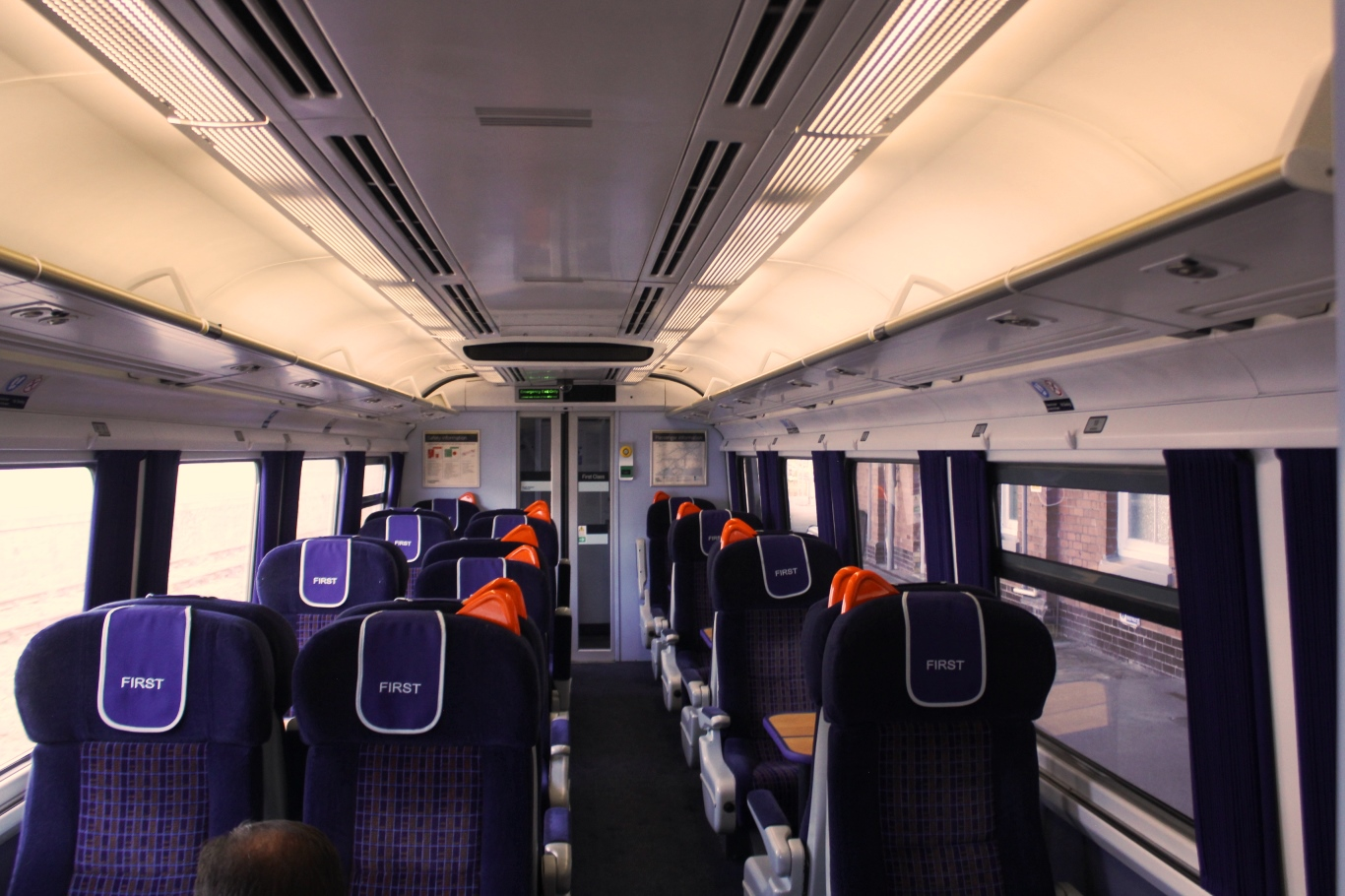
First class interior of a South Western Railway unit

=== Refurbishment of the Class 159/0 ===
==== 2000 ====
South West Trains (SWT) began a refurbishment programme for its 22 Class 159/0s in 2000; the seats were retrimmed and interiors repainted and the units were repainted into SWT livery.

==== 2008 ====
The units received another refurbishment in 2008 at Wabtec Doncaster. CCTV and Passenger Information Systems (PIS) were installed, new seating was installed in first class and a modified version of their express livery (with orange doors as opposed to the red doors on Class 444 units) for compliance with disabled access regulations.

=== Class 158 conversions ===
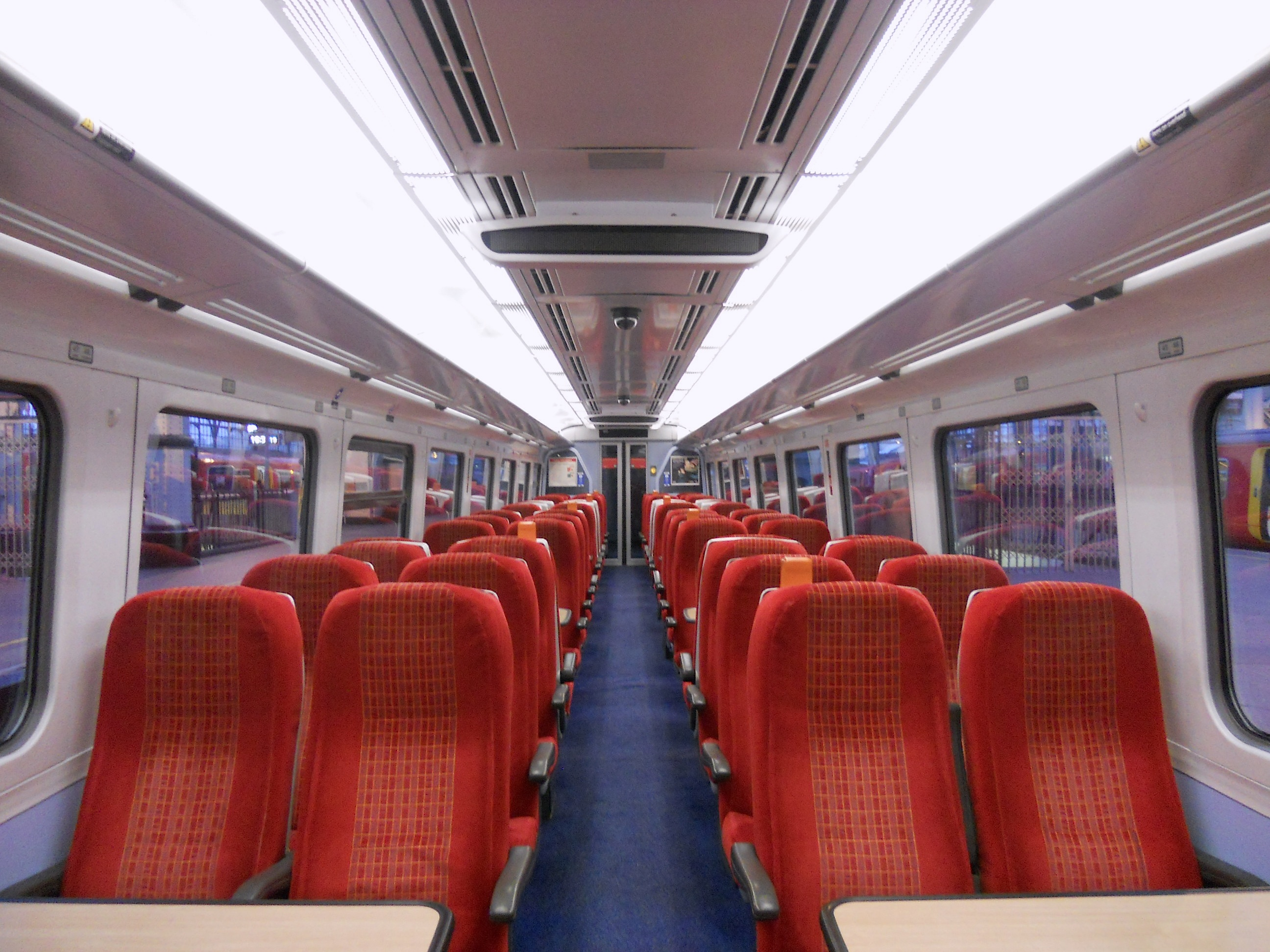
Standard class interior of a Class 159/1 unit in South West Trains colours

Eight of TransPennine's surplus three-coach Class 158 units were refurbished to match SWT's existing Class 159 units at Wabtec Doncaster, and renumbered into Class 159 subclass /1. The first updated units were delivered to SWT in November 2006 and, by May 2007, all of the new subclass were in service.

The refurbishment included making the first-class accommodation area larger and completely refitting it, with brighter interior lighting with new diffusers and the plating-over of the disused toilet in the MSO vehicle. The Class 159/1s have been fitted with retention toilets. Additional alterations include the installation of CCTV and PIS as is fitted on the 159/0s.

The converted units retained their original Cummins NTA855-R1 engines, which produce 37 kW (50 hp) less power than the R3 variants fitted to the Class 159/0 fleet.

== Fleet details ==
Class	Operator	Qty.	Year built	Cars per unit	Unit nos.	Notes
159/0	South Western Railway	22	1992–1993	3	159001–159022	Original fleet
159/1	South Western Railway	7	2006–2007 (converted)	3	159101, 159103–159108	Converted from Class 158
159/1	Scrapped	2 vehicles	2006–2007 (converted)	3	159102 (Note: As a result of being damaged in the 2021 Salisbury rail crash. Vehicles 57803 and 58703 subsequently scrapped.)	Converted from Class 158

=== Named units ===
Some units have received names:

- 159001 City of Exeter
- 159002 City of Salisbury
- 159003 Templecombe
- 159004 Basingstoke & Deane (de-named)
- 159006 Seaton Tramway Seaton-Colyford-Colyton

== Liveries ==
Operating Company	Livery
South Western Railway	
South West Trains	
Network SouthEast	
