= Salisbury TMD =

Maintenance depot in Salisbury, England for South Western Railway

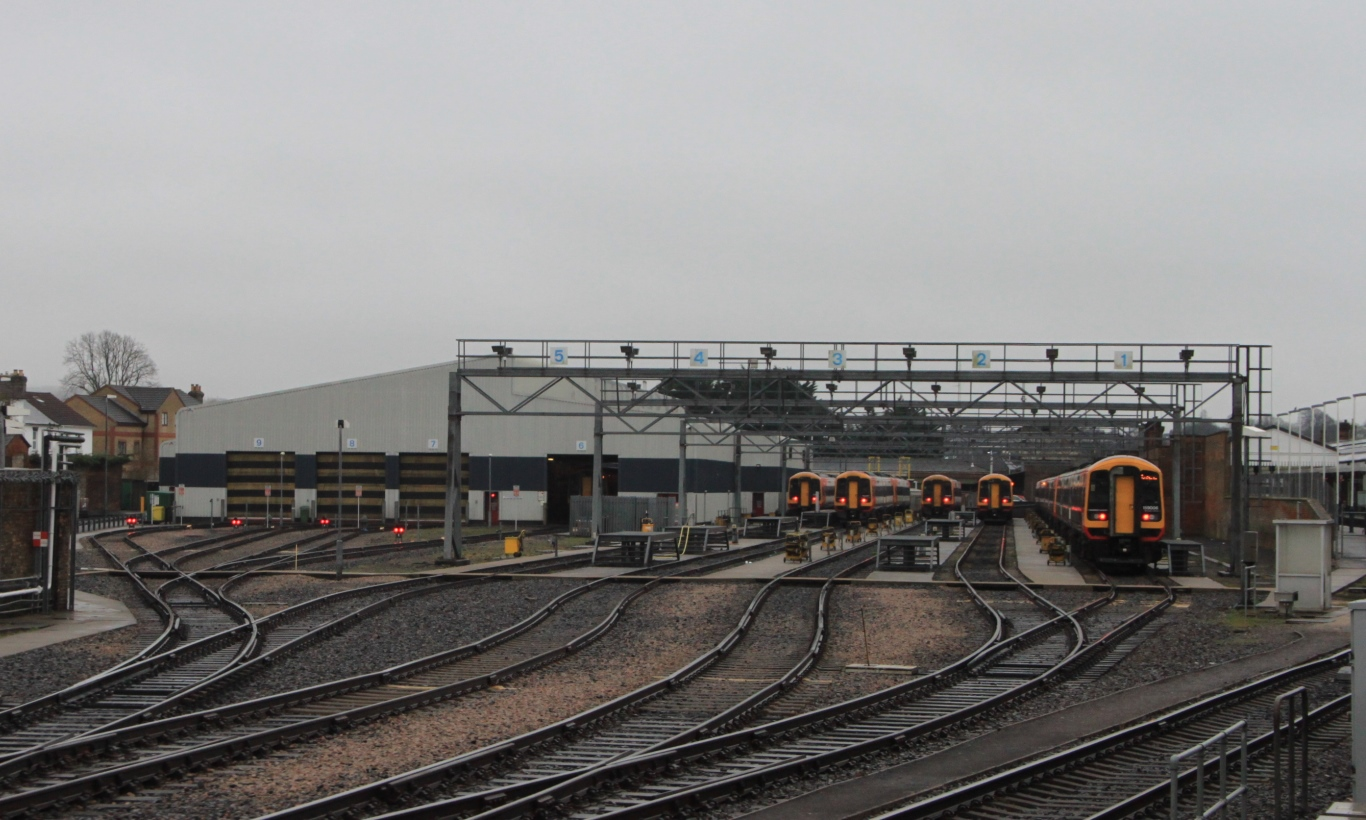
- The depot and sidings seen from the west
- Interactive map of Salisbury TMD

Location
- Location: Salisbury, England
- Coordinates: 51°04′16″N 1°48′23″W
- OS grid: SU135303

Characteristics
- Depot code: SA (1973-)
- Type: DMU
- Rolling stock: Class 158; Class 159

Salisbury TMD is the South Western Railway traction maintenance depot in Salisbury, Wiltshire, England, situated on the north side of Salisbury railway station. It opened in 1992 to maintain the fleet of DMUs used on the West of England line.

== History ==
The depot is built on the site of the former Great Western Railway (GWR) station, opened in 1856. A two-road engine shed was provided on the south side of the site but was moved westwards in 1899 to allow the London and South Western Railway (LSWR) to expand their adjacent station. This company originally had an engine shed at their Milford station on the opposite side of the city from 1847, which was relocated to a site opposite the GWR shed when the LSWR opened their new station in 1859. This three-road shed was closed around 1901 and moved to a new larger site further west from the station at Cherry Orchard Lane. This new facility had ten roads. It closed in June 1967 but was used to store withdrawn locomotives for a short time.

By 1987 the site was a stabling point, usually for Classes 08, 09 and 33.

The replacement of Class 50 locomotive-hauled trains on the West of England Main Line by Class 159 DMUs in 1992 meant that a new maintenance facility was required. It was decided to build a brand new depot at Salisbury, midway between the two ends of the route at London Waterloo and Exeter St Davids.

== Fleet ==
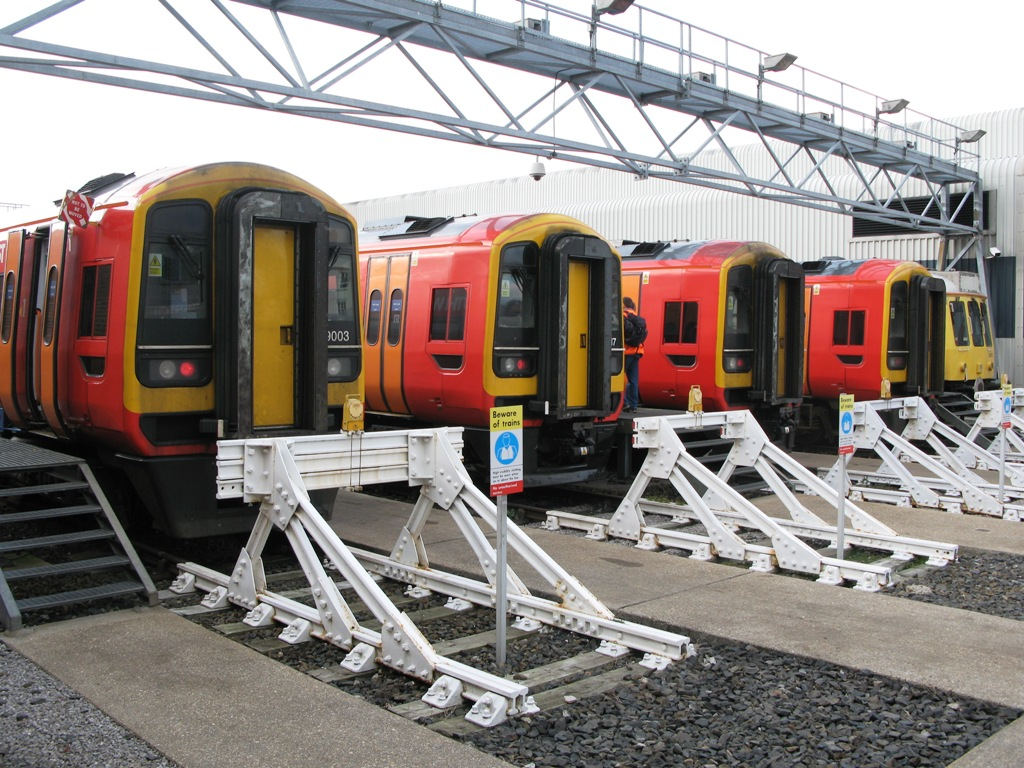
DMUs stabled at the depot

The depot maintains the diesel multiple units used on the West of England line and other South Western Railway routes:

- 32 three-car Class 159
- 10 two-car Class 158
