= British Rail Class 158 =

British class of diesel multiple unit trains

British Rail Class 158 Express Sprinter
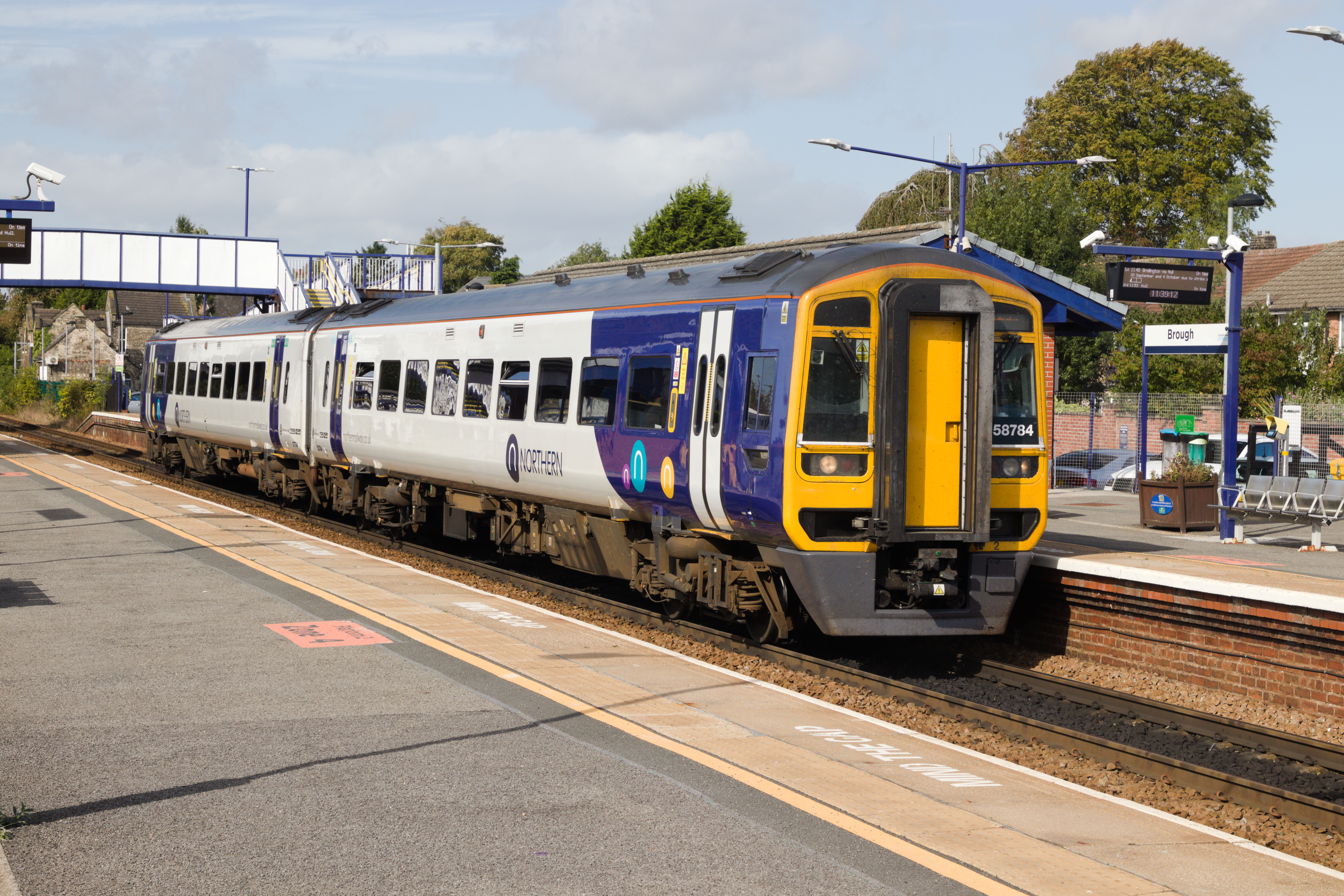
- A Northern Trains Class 158 at Brough in 2023

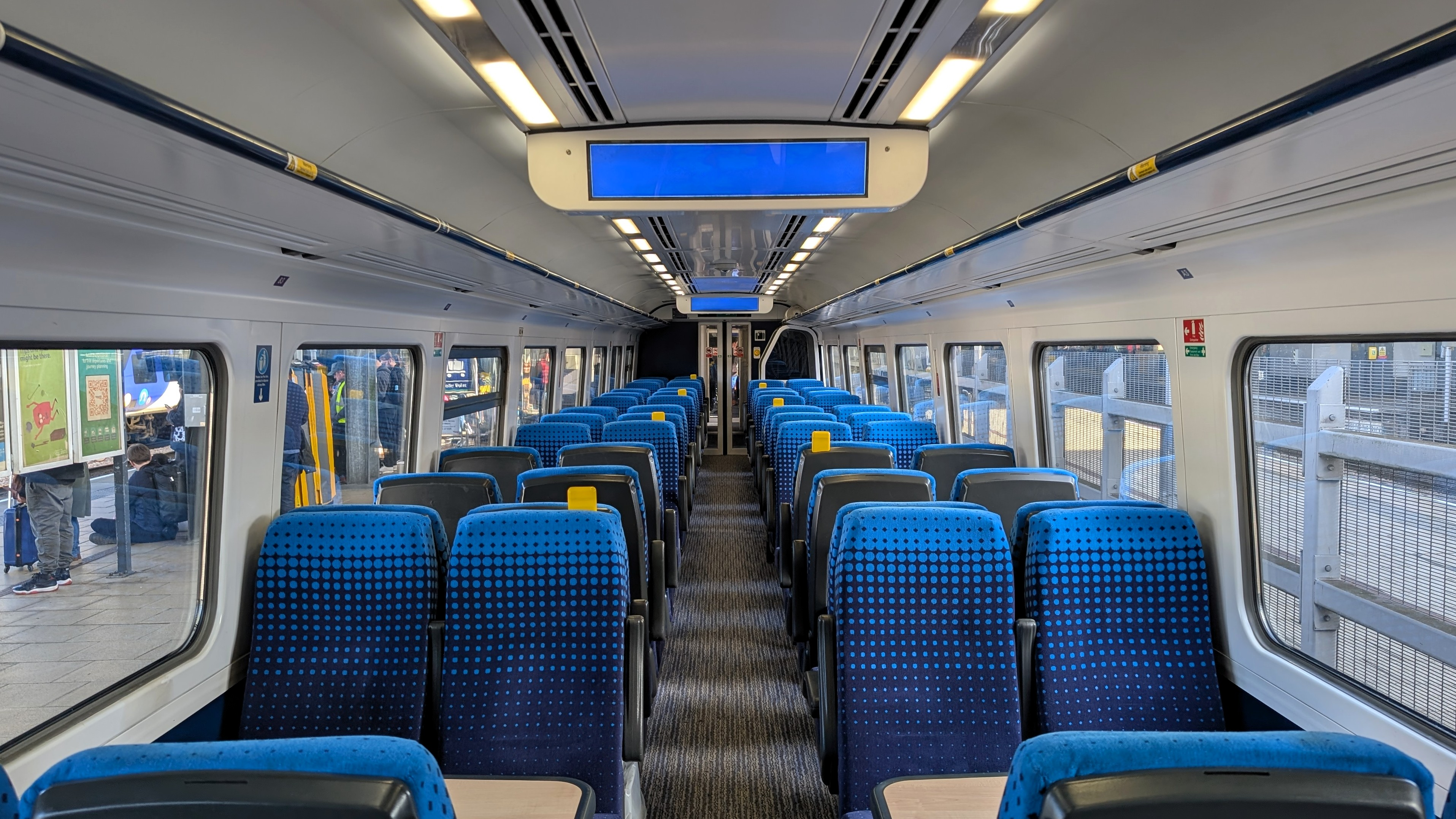
- Northern Trains interior in 2025
- Stock type: Diesel multiple unit
- In service: 17 September 1990 – present
- Manufacturer: British Rail Engineering Limited
- Built at: Derby Litchurch Lane Works
- Family name: Sprinter
- Replaced: Locomotive-hauled trains, BR First-Generation DMUs
- Constructed: 1989–1992
- Number built: 180 (8 converted to Class 159/1)
- Number in service: 171
- Number scrapped: 1
- Formation: 2 or 3 cars per unit
- Fleet numbers: (See § Fleet details)
- Capacity: NT: 138 or 142 seats per two-car unit 207 seats per three-car unit; SWR: 125 seats per two-car unit; TfW: 138 seats per two-car unit
- Owners: Angel Trains; Porterbrook
- Operators: East Midlands Railway, Great Western Railway; Northern Trains; ScotRail; South Western Railway; Transport for Wales Rail
- Depots: Corkerhill; Exeter; Heaton; Inverness; Machynlleth; Neville Hill; Nottingham Eastcroft; St Philip's Marsh; Salisbury
- Lines served: West of England Line; Tees Valley Line

Specifications
- Car body construction: Welded aluminium
- Car length: 22.57 m (74 ft 1 in)
- Width: 2.70 m (8 ft 10 in)
- Height: 3.73 m (12 ft 3 in)
- Doors: Double-leaf plug (2 per side per car)
- Maximum speed: 90 mph (145 km/h)
- Weight: 38.5 tonnes (42.4 short tons; 37.9 long tons) per car
- Axle load: Route Availability 1
- Prime movers: Units 158701–158814: Cummins NTA855-R1; Units 158815–158862: Perkins 2006 TW-H; Units 158863–158872: Cummins NTA855-R3; Units 158901–158910: Cummins NTA855-R1; (one per car, unit numbers as built)
- Engine type: Inline-6 4-stroke turbo-diesel
- Displacement: Cummins: 14.0 L (855.00 cu in); Perkins: 12.2 L (742.64 cu in); (per engine)
- Power output: NTA855-R1: 260 kW (350 hp); 2006-TWH: 260 kW (350 hp); NTA855-R3: 300 kW (400 hp)
- Transmission: Voith T 211 rz or T 211 rzz (hydrokinetic)
- Acceleration: 0.8 m/s^{2} (2.6 ft/s^{2})
- UIC classification: 2-car: 2′B′+B′2′; 3-car: 2′B′+B′2′+B′2′
- Bogies: Powered: BREL P4-4; Unpowered: BREL T4-4
- Braking system: Pneumatic (disc)
- Safety systems: AWS; TPWS; ETCS (158818-158841 only)
- Coupling system: BSI
- Multiple working: Within class and with Classes 14x, 15x and 170
- Track gauge: 1,435 mm (4 ft 8 1/2 in) standard gauge

The British Rail Class 158 Express Sprinter is a type of diesel multiple unit (DMU) passenger train. It is a member of the Sprinter series of regional trains, produced as a replacement for British Rail's first generation of DMUs; of the other members, the Class 159 is almost identical to the Class 158, having been converted from Class 158 to Class 159 in two batches to operate express services from London Waterloo to the West of England.

The Class 158 was constructed between 1989 and 1992 by British Rail Engineering Limited (BREL) at its Derby Litchurch Lane Works. The majority were built as two-car sets; some three-car sets were also produced. During September 1990, the first Express Sprinters were operated by ScotRail; the type was promptly introduced to secondary routes across the Midlands, Northern England, Wales and the South West. The Class 158 enabled the replacement of large numbers of elderly DMUs but also several locomotive-hauled trains as well; this was partially accomplished via the cascading of existing Sprinter units onto other routes. To capitalise on the Class 158's improved onboard amenities in comparison to other rolling stock in use for regional services, the Alphaline branding was launched during the mid-1990s; it was also used for a time in the post-privatisation era.

As a result of British Rail's privatisation in the mid-1990s, the Class 158s were divided amongst various newly created operators broadly along their existing routes. Due to their relatively young age at that time, most operators elected to retain them for the following decades. Several, such as Northern Rail and Arriva Trains Wales, had their Class 158 fleets modernised and refitted with various new facilities, such modifications often including greater accessibility, onboard passenger information systems, wi-fi connectivity, and toilet retention tanks. By the 2020s, many Class 158 operators had started to or had replaced the type with newer rolling stock, such as the Class 170 Turbostar, Class 185 Desiro and Class 197 Civity multiple units.

== Background ==
By the beginning of the 1980s, British Rail (BR) operated a large fleet of first generation DMUs, which had been constructed in prior decades to various designs. While formulating its long-term strategy for this sector of its operations, British Rail planners recognised that there would be considerable costs incurred by undertaking refurbishment programmes necessary for the continued use of these ageing multiple units, particularly due to the necessity of handling and removing hazardous materials such as asbestos. In light of the high costs involved in retention, planners examined the prospects for the development and introduction of a new generation of DMUs to succeed the first generation.

In the concept stage, two separate approaches were devised, one involving a so-called railbus that prioritised the minimisation of both initial (procurement) and ongoing (maintenance and operational) costs, while the second was a more substantial DMU that could deliver superior performance than the existing fleet, particularly when it came to long-distance services. The initial specification developed for the latter concept was relatively ambitious, calling for a maximum speed of 90 mph (140 km/h), acceleration comparable to contemporary EMUs, the ability to couple/work in multiple with existing EMUs, facilitate through-access for passengers, feature pressure ventilation, the ability to assist a failed unit, and to comprise either a three- or four-car consist. This specification led to the experimental Class 210 diesel-electric multiple unit. However, it was found that relatively expensive equipment was needed for the performance specified, particularly to provide sufficient speed, acceleration and through-passenger access; maintainability also suffered due to space limitations. It was recognised that a production model assembled from proven components would possess greater reliability and lower maintenance costs; an availability rate of 85% was forecast.

By 1983, experiences with the Class 210 had influenced BR planners to favour procuring a new generation of DMUs, but to also adopt a new specification that were somewhat less demanding than before. Specifically, it was decided to drop the top speed from 90 to 75 mph (145 to 121 km/h), as testing had revealed the higher rate to deliver no perceivable improvement in journey times due to the typically short spacing of the stations the type was intended to serve. Furthermore, it was determined that a propulsion system delivering 7 hp per tonne would deliver sufficient acceleration. The requests for compatibility with other rolling stock were eliminated, although auto-coupling and auto-connecting functionality was added. In addition to a good ride quality, the specification included a sound level of 90 dB when at full speed, an operational range of 1,000 miles (1,600 km), and an interval between major overhauls of five years or 350,000 miles (560,000 km). While the prior generation of DMUs typically used a pair of engines for each power car, the specification called for only a single engine per car, as well as for sufficient cooling so that, even with one failed engine, a two-car unit could maintain a typical service performance without major deficient. It was also intended that the DMU could be assembled akin to building blocks, comprising between two and four cars that could be outfitted with various passenger amenities such as toilets and luggage spaces.

Initially formalised as a business specification, these requirements were transferred into a relatively broad technical specification that avoided any specifics other than those that were deemed essential for compatibility purposes. Thereafter, it was issued to various rolling stock manufacturers for a competitive tender. Under this process, responding manufacturers submitted bids to construct an initial series of three-car demonstration units. A constrained timetable of only 18 months between the date of order to delivery of these prototypes was also specified; this has been attributed as having compelled manufacturers to lean towards existing industrial practices for their submissions. The bid submitted by British Rail Engineering Limited (BREL) was heavily based on its successful Class 455 EMU, sharing its body and the majority of its running gear, albeit equipped with two different power trains. The railway engineering company Metro-Cammell also bid, offered its own design that employed rivetted aluminium construction; this approach produced a meaningful weight reduction over conventional methods. BR officials opted to proceed with a pair of prototypes from both BREL and Metro-Cammell, resulting in the Class 150 and Class 151 respectively.

Between 1984 and 1985, these prototype units were delivered to BR and commenced their trial service period. Both the Class 150 and 151 units were subject to extensive evaluations with the aim of a larger production order being forthcoming for the more successful of the two types. Testing revealed that the Class 150 had exceptional ride quality, as well as fully satisfying the 50 per cent engine-out performance requirements. It was also determined that both types achieved adequate noise levels for its intended service sector, but were also noted that this area would likely pose an issue if they were ever directed towards the higher end of the market. Early concerns regarding the body bending frequency of the Class 151 did not prove to have major substance to them. Ultimately, the Class 150 prototypes proved to be more reliable and an order for 50 two-car units was accordingly issued to BREL, leading to a production batch of Class 150s.

Even prior to the introduction of the Class 150, there was a recognised interest within BR at potentially tasking the new DMU with the replacement of other services, targeting not only first-generation DMUs but a number of locomotive-hauled trains as well. It had also been observed that, in its current configuration, the Class 150 would be unsatisfactory in some criteria for more-upmarket services, but that some thought into developing derivatives of the type to handle such services had been made. One early solution for reducing internal noise levels was the discarding of openable windows in favour of fully-sealed units, along with the relocation of the external doors into vestibules located at either ends of each coach.

Furthermore, the coaches could be stretched, providing more internal volume and thus enabling the somewhat cramped two-by-three seating arrangement of the Class 150 to be substituted with a more roomy two-by-two counterpart. These changes could be implemented without impacting much of the benefits of adopting the existing design. It was identified that this would result in a weight increase and thus a decreased power-to-weight ratio. Studies determined that the performance of the proposed DMU showed only minor change, and would achieve similar journey times across the intended cross-country routes to the Class 150. It was also found that, while there was a slight increase in fuel consumption due to the modifications, the envisioned DMU possessed significantly less fuel consumption than locomotive-hauled trains as well as reduced maintenance costs. Accordingly, it was decided to proceed with developing a detailed specification and issuing it to industry.

The Class 158 is a two- or three-car diesel unit designed for regional express services. The bodyshells are aluminium with doors at each end of the passenger saloon. Each vehicle is fitted with a Cummins or Perkins turbo-diesel engine that drives both axles on the inner bogie via a Voith T 211 two-speed hydrokinetic transmission and Gmeinder GM 190 final drive unit. The engines were rated at either 350 hp (260 kW) or 400 hp (300 kW), depending on the model. Maximum speed is 90 mph (145 km/h). Most units were built with two coaches, but a batch of units contained an additional centre car for the busy Transpennine Route. Each vehicle is fitted with a BSI autocoupler at both ends; however, only the cab ends have automatic electrical connecters. This allowed three-car sets to be formed by inserting an additional driving car into a set with an adaptor for two different gangway sizes.

== Description ==
=== Variants ===
A total of 182 Class 158 units were constructed. The majority were built as two-car sets. Seventeen units were produced as three-car units; eight of these units have since had the centre car transferred to different units of the class, whilst another eight have been upgraded and redesignated as the Class 159. The final ten units were built specifically for West Yorkshire PTE Metro services around Leeds. The majority of units, as originally built by British Rail Engineering Limited (BREL), were configured with standard-class accommodation only; a number of Scottish-based sets were fitted with a small first-class section in one vehicle. Later on, several other sets were retrofitted with first-class accommodation.

=== Passenger facilities and performance ===
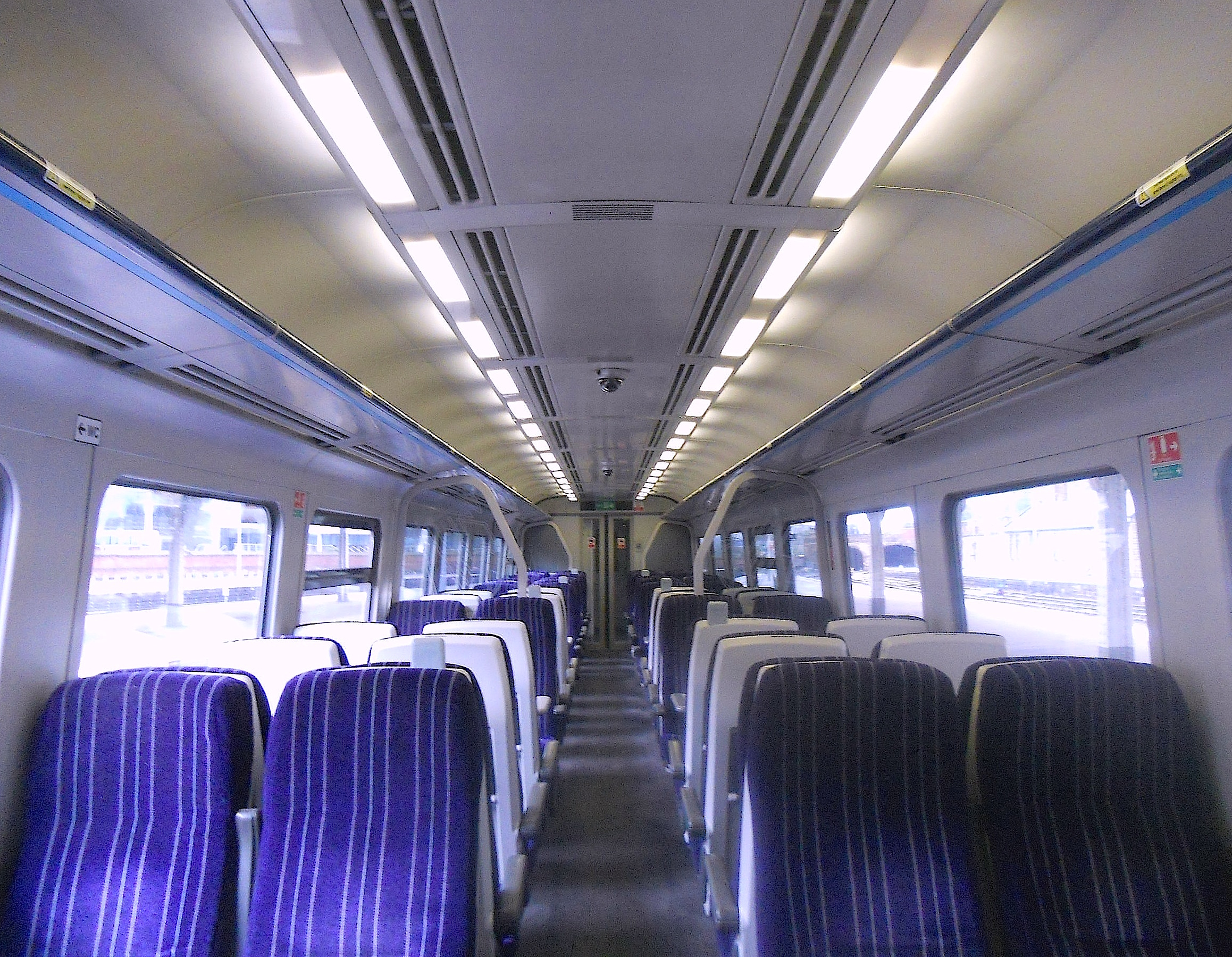
The interior of a Northern Rail refurbished Class 158 (first refurbishment)

Around the time of its introduction, BR was keen to promote the qualities of the Class 158, on one occasion publicly describing it as having brought "new standards of comfort and quality to rail travel on Regional Railways' key long-distance cross-country routes".

As originally built, the interiors were carpeted throughout, large "panoramic" windows lined the sides and a variety of seating arrangements were present, including airline-style and bays of four set around tables. Unlike the previous members of the Sprinter family, such as the Class 156 SuperSprinter, the Class 158 was outfitted with air conditioning units, an on-board payphone, power-operated interior doors, a toilet in each carriage, and provision for a refreshment trolley service. Despite an increased top speed of 90 mph (145 km/h), the Class 158 reportedly promised a smoother and quieter ride in comparison to its predecessors. Toilets were fitted to both vehicles; one was wheelchair-accessible (as defined at the time of construction) and one standard. A wheelchair space was provided in the passenger section closest to the accessible toilet. Luggage racks were fitted at each end of the saloon, one of which is capable of being locked for mail and parcels.

In terms of serviceability, the Class 158 was anticipated to achieve 13,500 miles (21,700 km) of operation between major services and to have a range of up to 1,600 miles (2,600 km) from each refuelling.

=== Technical problems ===
Despite the attention given to its passenger facilities, the construction and engineering technology used on the Class 158s contributed to some issues during its service life. As a lightweight unit and the first members of the Sprinter group to use disc brakes, autumn leaf mulch built up on wheel rims and prevented the units from correctly operating signalling track circuits. Although this was later solved by installing scrubbing blocks to clean the wheels, temporary solutions were sought during October 1992, with some units split and formed into hybrid units with Class 156 coaches, the latter possessing tread brakes which cleaned the wheels as a by-product of their standard operation.

The air conditioning systems of the Class 158 also proved to be unreliable in service, particularly following the outlawing of the CFC gases with which they had been originally designed to work. In the privatisation era, many operators elected either to re-engineer or entirely replace such equipment. As a result, the systems in use and their effectiveness vary considerably across the fleet.

The lightweight aluminium body of the Class 158 leads to a good 'route availability' score, meaning that it is able to operate in areas of Britain's railways that heavier units cannot. However, the units were refused permission by Network Rail to operate on the Conwy Valley and Borderlands lines due to station dwell times and issues of platform clearance.

== Operations ==
=== British Rail ===
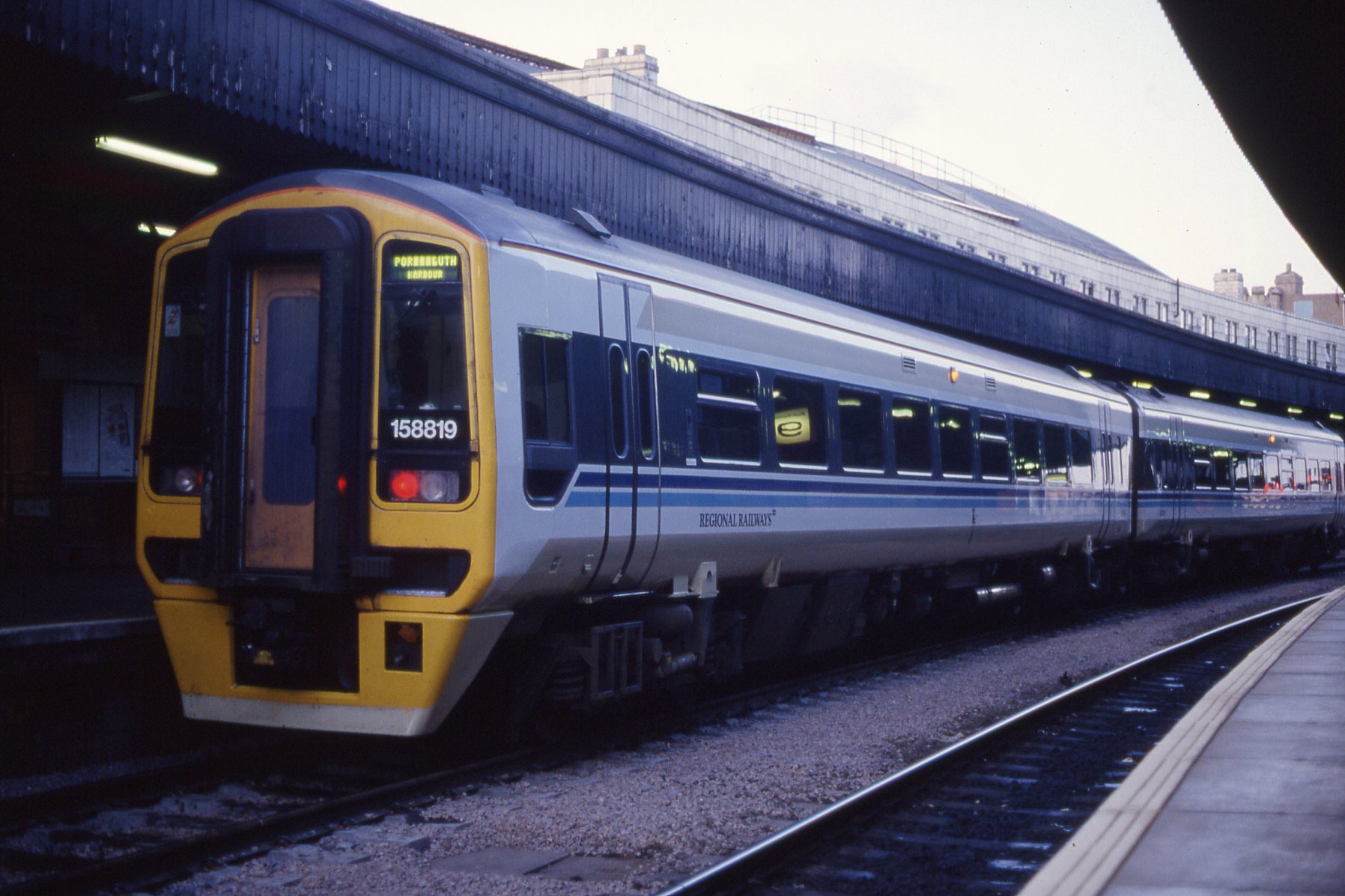
British Rail 158819 at Bristol Temple Meads in 1993

ScotRail was the first part of British Rail to introduce the Class 158s to public service in September 1990. These were employed on Glasgow Queen Street to Edinburgh Waverley services, as well as services to Aberdeen and Inverness. The Class 158s then went on to be deployed elsewhere in Britain, primarily in the Midlands, Northern England, Wales and the South West.

The majority of the Class 158 fleet was directed towards the Regional Railways division; accordingly, it rapidly became the dominant platform on the numerous secondary express services between provincial towns and cities across Great Britain. Examples include the long-distance TransPennine services in the north of England, as well as a range of upgraded regional services in the Midlands, Wales and the South West. During the mid-1990s, the Alphaline brand centred around the Class 158s and the higher-end regional express services. These were routinely promoted as possessing premium passenger amenities that traditional regional rolling stock had lacked, such as the presence of British Telecom card phones and air conditioning.

=== Post privatisation ===
After the privatisation of British Rail, the Class 158 fleet was divided among several franchises:

==== ScotRail ====
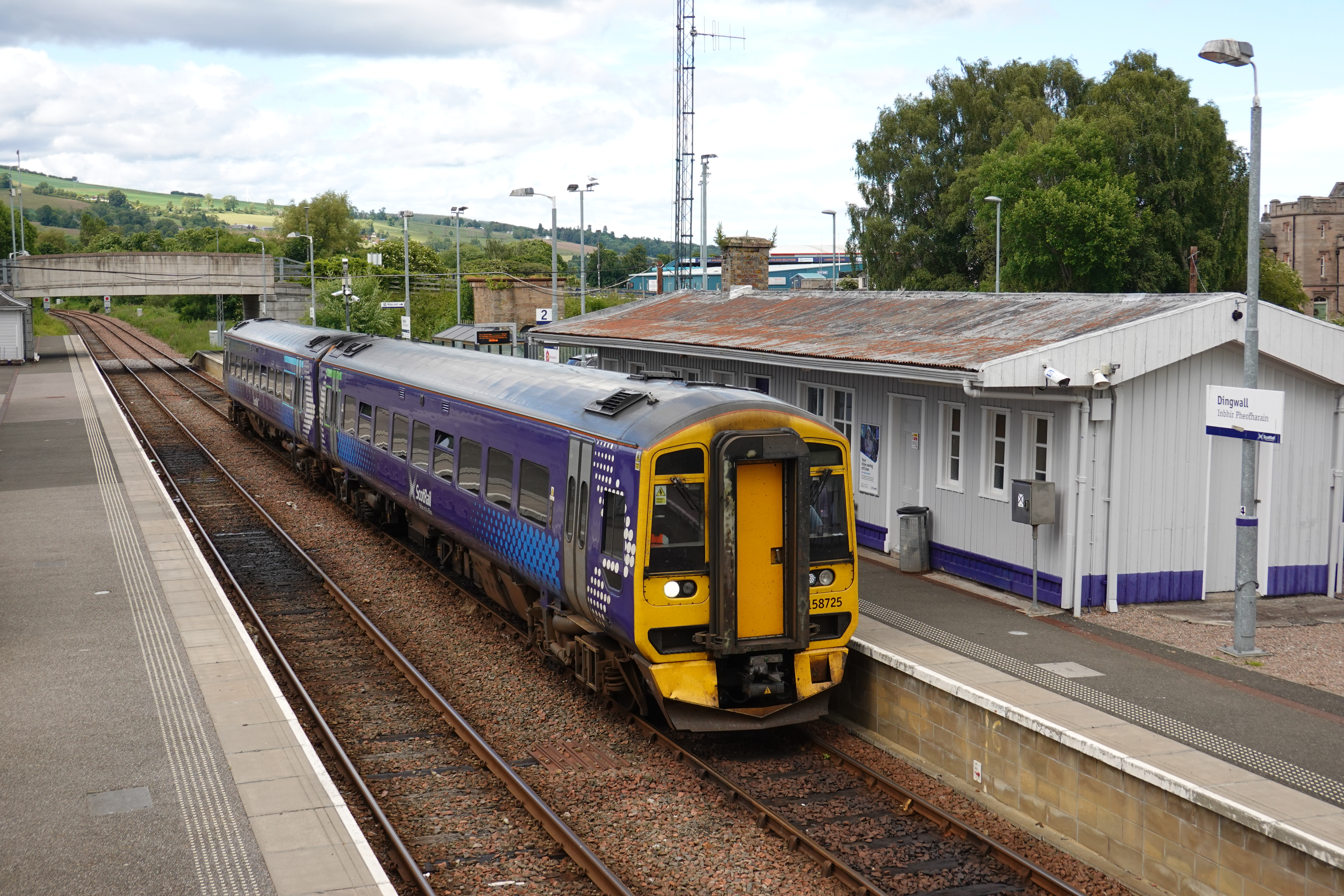
A ScotRail Class 158 at Dingwall in 2024

The first privatised incarnation of ScotRail inherited a 46-strong fleet which continued in service. Following the introduction of newly built Class 170 Turbostar units on primary express services in 1999, the Class 158 fleet was reduced in number by six, with those remaining cascaded away to secondary routes such as the Far North Line.

During 2003, plans were mooted for a portion of the fleet to be swapped with Class 156 units operated by Central Trains, as the latter were thought better suited to some of the short-distance routes that were being operated by ScotRail's 158s. However, this scheme failed to materialise and, by the mid-2000s, operations of ScotRail's Class 158s ranged from short hops (such as Glasgow Queen Street to Anniesland) to rural lines and long-distance expresses, supplementing other express units. In 2010, these units started to appear at Glasgow Central station to run on the Glasgow Central to Edinburgh via Shotts line, and on to the Glasgow Central to Whifflet line. Some additional units have since been acquired from other operators to provide extra capacity.

Refurbishment and reliverying has also taken place since privatisation. The original ScotRail franchise applied its own livery to the Class 158s, followed by a further repaint by First ScotRail after it took control of the franchise. The fleet has now gained a permanent blue-and-white livery based on the Scottish Saltire, after Transport Scotland announced in September 2008 that it was specifying a permanent livery for all Scottish trains, which would not be changed in the event of a change of franchisee. Interiors have also seen attention on more than one occasion. The most recent refurbishment of 25 units involved repainting, new seating, extra luggage space and new customer information systems. Toilet retention tanks were also fitted.

==== Transport for Wales ====
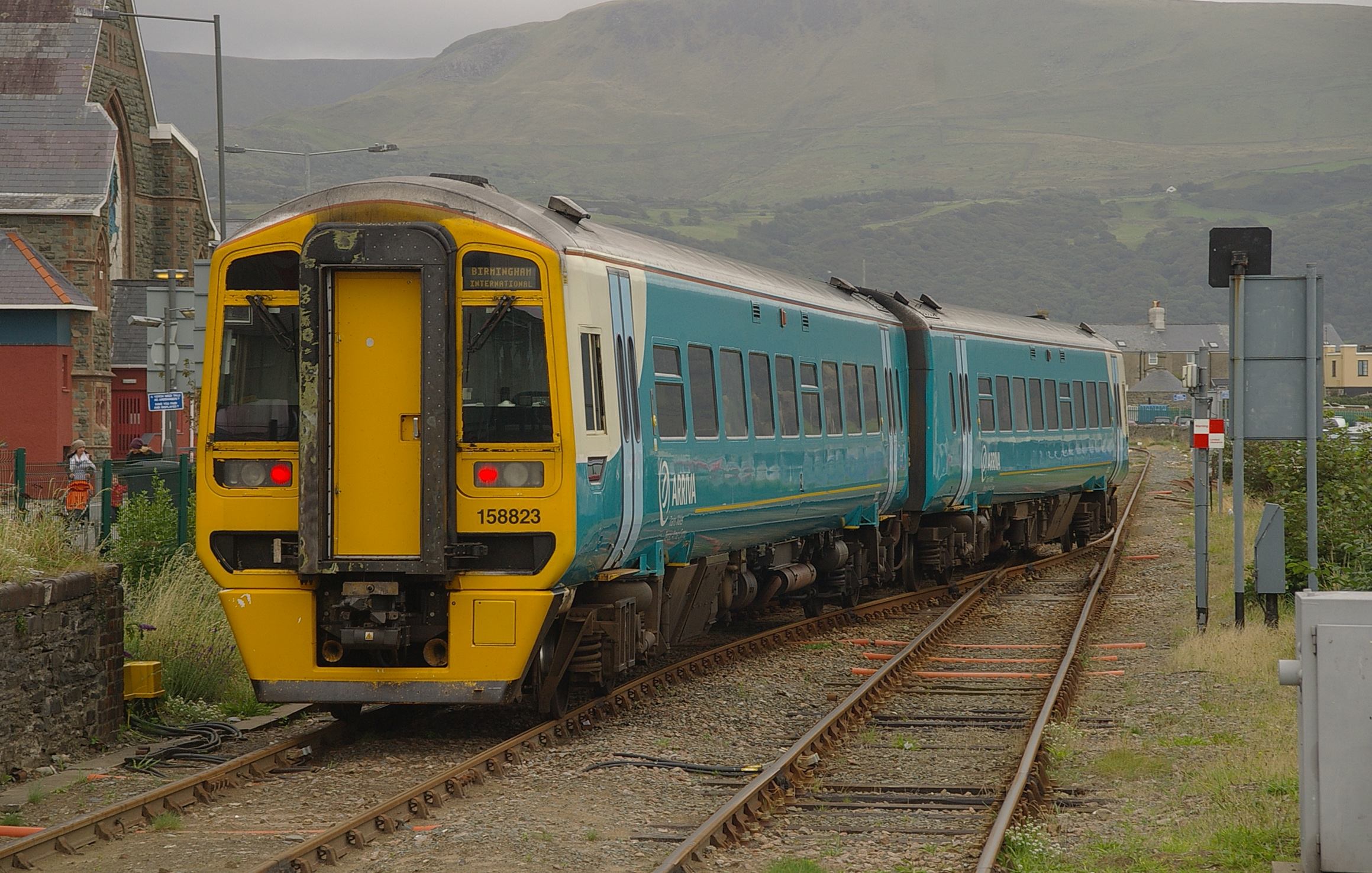
Unrefurbished Arriva Trains Wales (ATW) 158823 at Barmouth in 2009. Class 158s are required on Cambrian Line services as they are the only Transport for Wales trains fitted with the ERTMS signalling used on the line.

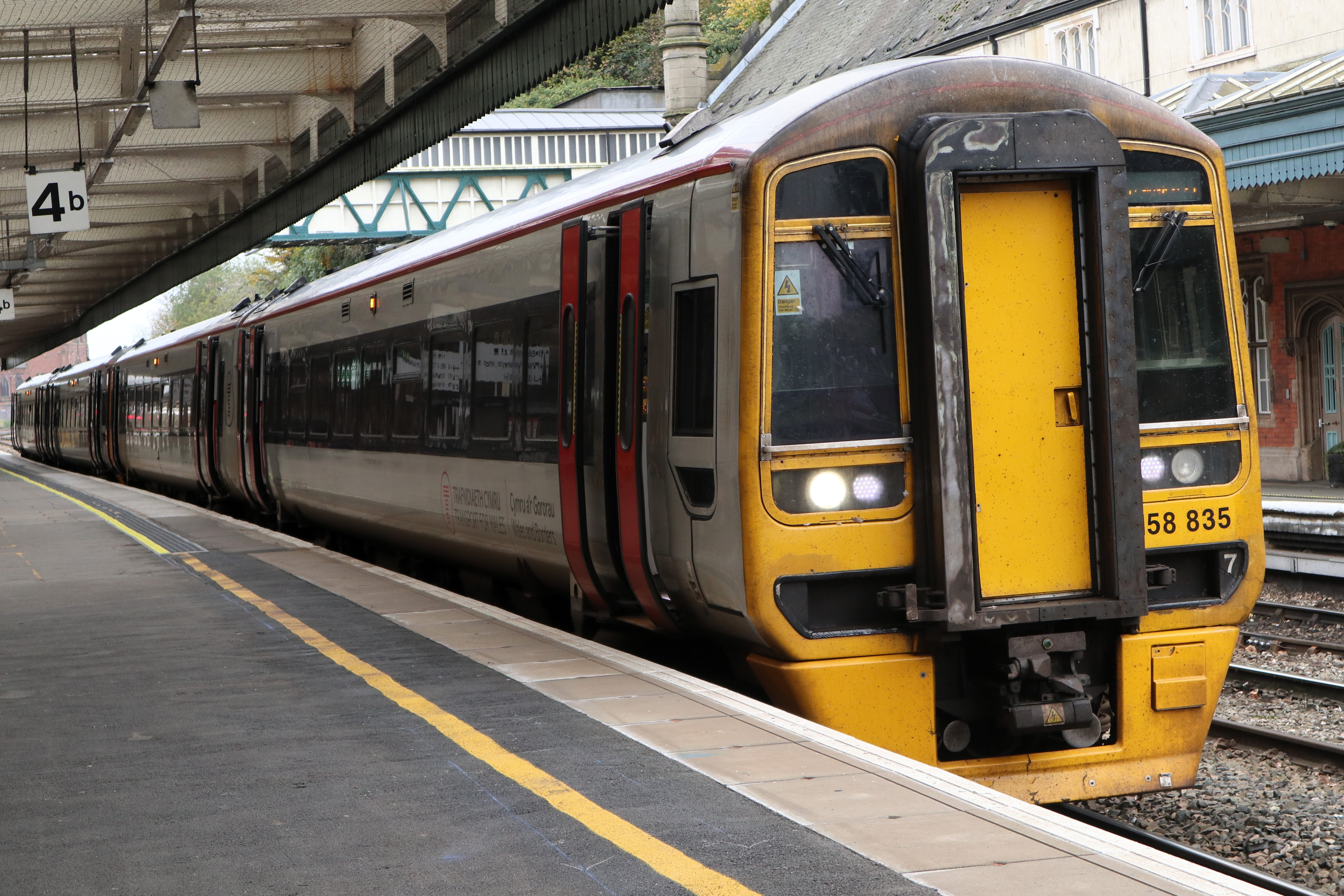
158835 at Shrewsbury with Transport for Wales in 2024

In the early days of privatisation, the Class 158 Express Sprinter units were in regular use by Wales & West on its long-distance Alphaline services from South Wales to North-West England, North Wales, Cornwall and London Waterloo, as well as on some Central Trains services to Cardiff Central and along the Cambrian Line. Successor companies Wales & Borders (2001) and Arriva Trains Wales (2003) continued to use this type of unit on similar workings, with a total allocation of 40 units also allowing Cambrian Line services to become entirely Class 158-operated. By the end of 2006, a total of 16 units (158815–158817 and 158842–158854) had returned to the leasing company, as Arriva gained exclusive use of the entire Class 175 Coradia fleet which had previously been shared with other train operators.

The remaining 24-strong fleet became permanently based at a purpose-built depot in Machynlleth during 2007. Despite initial problems in retro-fitting the necessary 'glass cockpit'-style driver controls, Arriva's Class 158 Express Sprinter units became the first fleet in the UK to be equipped for regular use with the ETCS Level 2 signalling system. Commercial operation under ETCS started on 28 March 2011.

Accordingly, the units operate all Cambrian Line services between mid-Wales and Birmingham, and they supplemented the now-withdrawn Class 175 Coradia units on other long-distance routes. During 2009, Arriva also proposed using the fleet to provide a direct service between Aberystwyth and London, although this proposal was later rejected by the Office of Rail Regulation.

Between December 2010 and October 2012, there was a comprehensive refurbishment of the ATW Class 158 fleet, during which almost the entirety of the interiors was replaced with 'as new' fittings and fixtures. This work, which was funded by the Welsh Assembly Government at a cost of £7.5m, included both interior and exterior repainting, the installation of replacement seating, wall coverings, carpets, lighting, luggage racks and toilet fittings. A passenger information system was also fitted, while selected seats gained at-seat power sockets for mobile phones and laptops.

Prior to the early 2010s refurbishment, the fleet had been subject to only minor attention to its interior since a refit by Wales & West during the late 1990s (little more than the fabric on the older seats changed and CCTV fitted) as well as having been only partially repainted into Arriva colours externally. The door controls and exterior destination displays were two of the few elements to be replaced prior to this refurbishment work.

During 2017, wi-fi equipment was fitted fleetwide. In June of the following year, the Class 158s were progressively modified for conformance with the Persons with Reduced Mobility (PRM) requirements so that the fleet could be operated beyond 1 January 2020; this work involved the expansion of space allocated to passengers using wheelchairs, the installation of wider internal doorways, and the toilet areas being rebuilt to be fully accessibility-friendly; toilet retention tanks were also fitted at this time. During late August 2018, the first PRM-compliant Class 158 was introduced by ATW.

On 14 October 2018, the Class 158 fleet was transferred to the new operator Transport for Wales. During February 2019, the first unit was seen in Transport for Wales colours. As early as 2018, it was being reported that Transport for Wales were planning to replace its Class 158s with newly built Class 197 multiple units by 2023.

==== East Midlands Railway ====
East Midlands Railway 158774 at Peterborough

The Class 158 units were introduced to the East Midlands by Regional Railways Central to replace the Class 156 Super Sprinter on long-distance express services branded as Alphaline, such as Norwich to Liverpool Lime Street via Nottingham. Following privatisation, Central Trains operated these services but quickly procured a large fleet of Class 170 Turbostar units for such services and transferred the Class 158 fleet to secondary routes such as Birmingham New Street to Hereford and Derby to Matlock.

East Midlands Trains (EMT) had a fleet of 25 units inherited from Central Trains, with some units transferred from First Great Western and South West Trains. EMR's Express Sprinter units operate long-distance express services, such as Norwich to Liverpool, and secondary non-express workings such as Nottingham to Skegness, Nottingham to Matlock. and Leicester to Lincoln Central.

The hourly Norwich to Liverpool service has been criticised for overcrowding, especially between Liverpool and Nottingham. This resulted from the Department for Transport specifying two-coach units in the EMT franchise starting in November 2007. In the light of persistent and excessive overcrowding, with some passengers being left behind on occasions, the DfT eventually admitted that it had made a mistake. Various cascades of other units enabled more Class 158 stock to be released for this route, and from the December 2011 timetable change the busiest services have been lengthened to four-coach trains between Liverpool and Nottingham, with units splitting and joining at Nottingham as necessary, two-coach trains being regarded as adequate between Nottingham and Norwich. Further services on this route were strengthened from December 2012.

During May 2015, 158889 transferred to EMT from South West Trains on a two-year loan. This allocation was then made permanent in August 2017 following Stagecoach's loss of the South Western franchise to South Western Railway.

On 18 August 2019, all units were passed to East Midlands Railway, who operated them under the "EMR Regional" sub-brand. As part of its full fleet replacement, EMR plans to gradually replace the Class 158 along with its other Sprinter family members with newer Class 170 Turbostars from 2020.

==== Great Western Railway ====
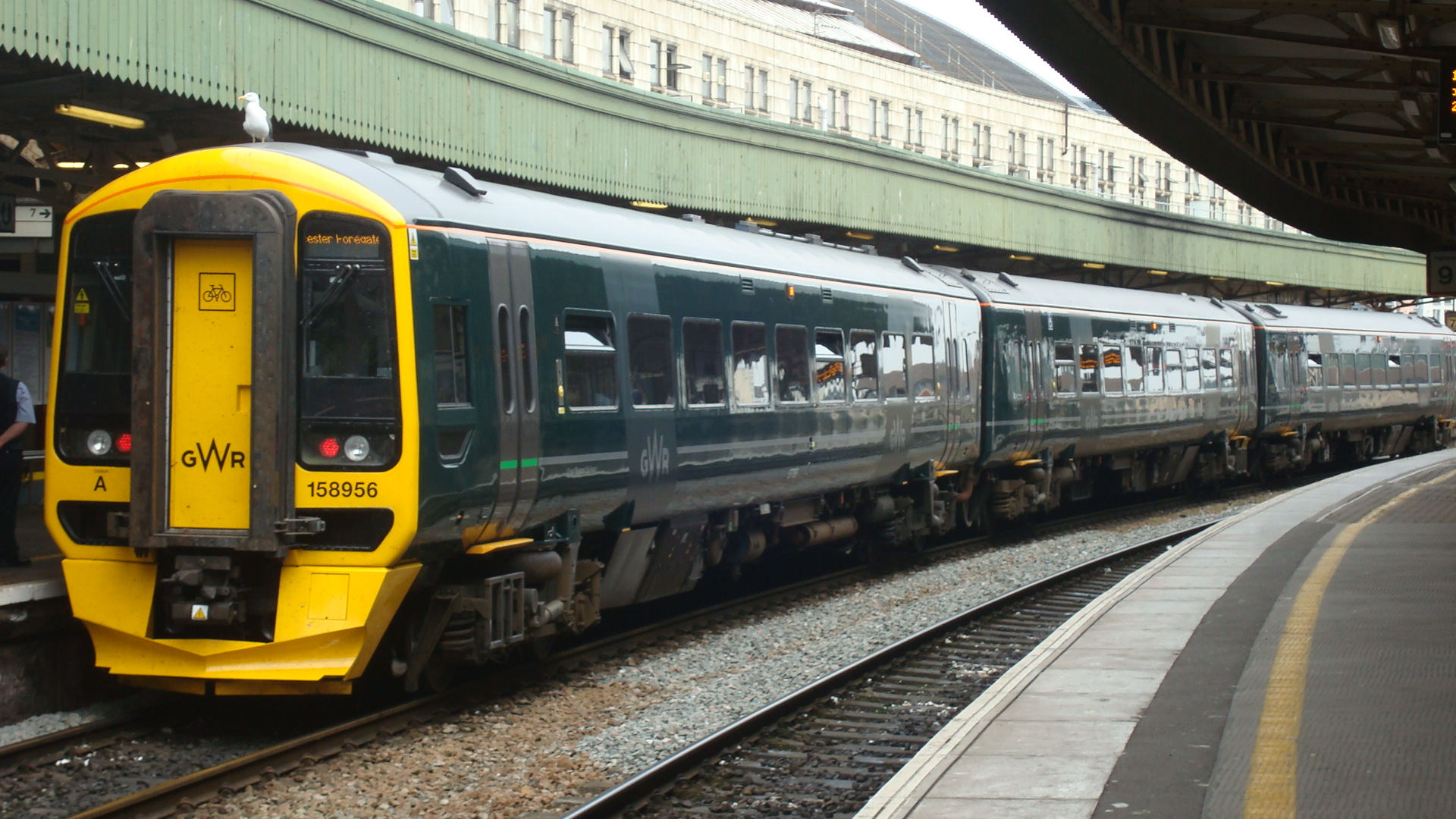
Great Western Railway 158956 at Bristol Temple Meads in 2016

The Wales & West franchise (later Wessex Trains) originally operated twelve Class 158 units on long-distance services on the Wessex Main Line. These units were extended into three-coach formations with the acquisition of further units. Unlike the purpose-built three-car Class 158s and Class 159 units, the centre car was a Driving Motor with the cab locked out of use and an adapter to connect the different-sized gangways.

In 2006, First Great Western (FGW) inherited the Wessex Trains fleet following the merger of the Great Western and Wessex franchises. During late 2007 and early 2008, the FGW fleet was refurbished. Improvements included: re-upholstery of seats, and repainting or replacement of interior fittings, alterations to interior lighting and total replacement of toilets. Additionally, the windows have been replaced with safer laminated glass and Halon fire extinguishers replaced with foam ones. At the same time, the units' engines were overhauled and the units repainted in FGW's own lilac and blue colours.

In October 2020, Arriva TrainCare completed a refurbishment of the Class 158 fleet in line with the C6 exam. This included: full interior and exterior repaint, and rebrand to new GWR corporate colours, installation of new air conditioning system and heaters and overhauling the seating and flooring. In addition, a new passenger information system was installed as well as new toilet systems.

==== Northern Trains ====
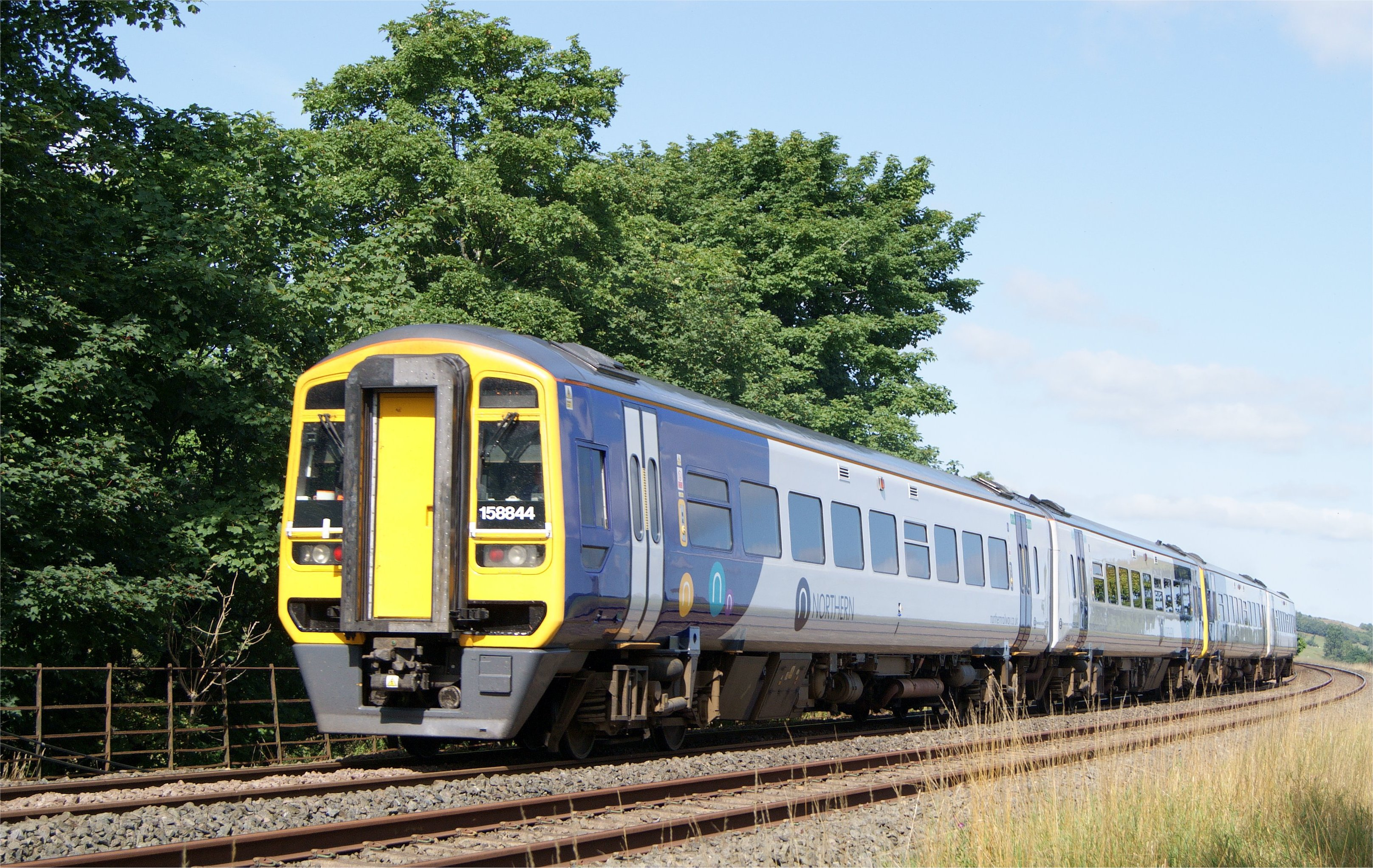
A four-car Class 158 operating a Northern Trains service for Carlisle

During 2006, First TransPennine Express started to replace its Class 158s with newer Class 185 Desiro and Class 170 Turbostar units. The Class 158s were subsequently transferred to Northern Rail, Central Trains, South West Trains and First Great Western.

==== South Western Railway ====
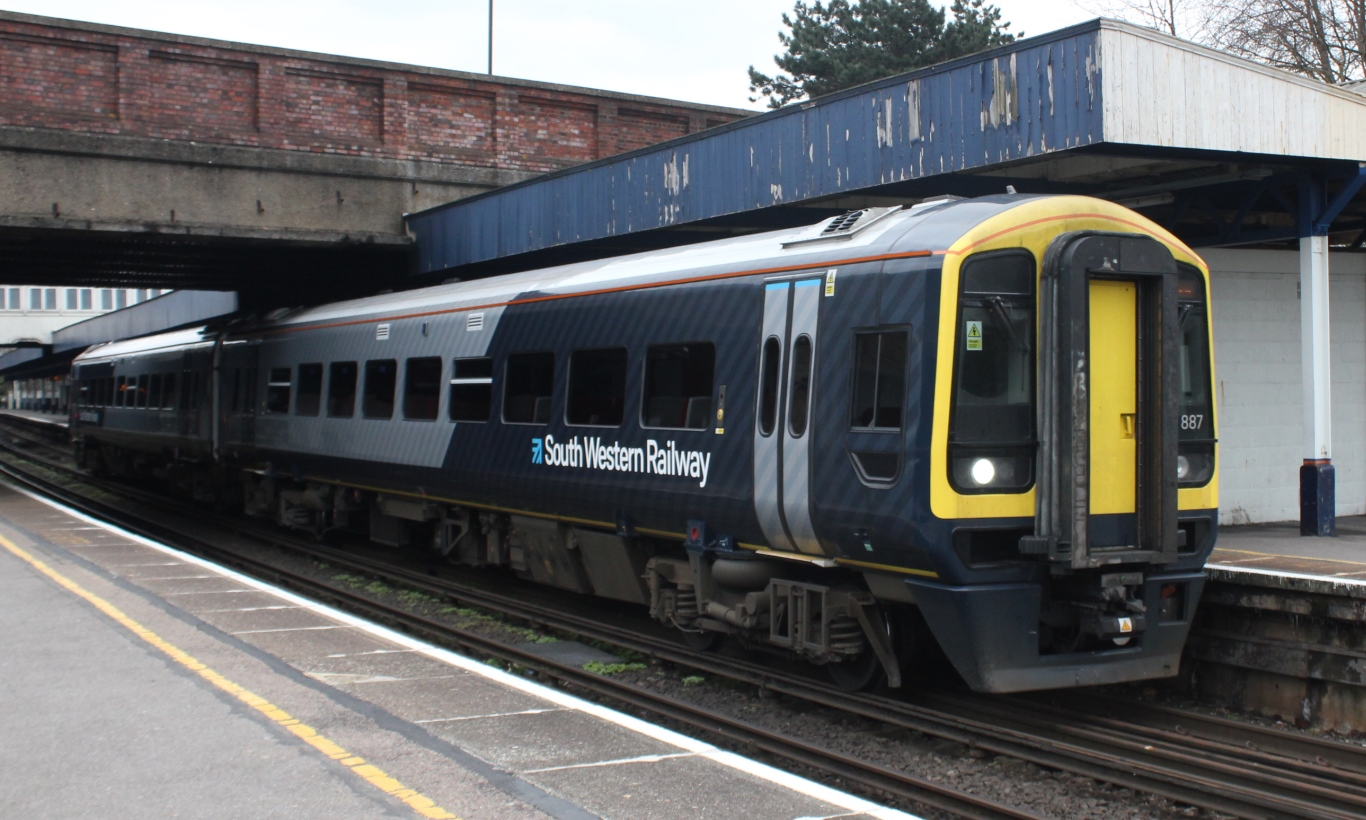
A South Western Railway Class 158 at Southampton Central

Currently South Western Railway operates Class 158s from Exeter St Davids and Salisbury to London Waterloo; and on the Salisbury to Romsey via Southampton Central service. South Western Railway also operates Class 159 units.

==== Virgin CrossCountry ====
Five units (158747–158751) were delivered to British Rail's InterCity sector to operate services from Manchester Airport to Edinburgh Waverley, via the West Coast Main Line. All five Class 158s were transferred to Virgin CrossCountry as a result of the privatisation process; these were subsequently used on services between Swindon and Birmingham New Street via Stroud. During 2003, the company's Class 158s were displaced by the newly built Class 220 and 221 high-speed diesel tilting trains.

== Accidents and incidents ==
- On 25 March 1994 at Newton Abbot, 158833, working a Paignton to Cardiff service, ran into the back of a Class 43 HST standing in the platform with a Penzance to Edinburgh train. Thirty-one people were injured.
- On 3 December 2005, unit 158856 was involved in an accident at Elsenham in which two passengers were killed whilst crossing the line. The Rail Accident Investigation Branch (RAIB) criticised the risk assessment at the crossing as inadequate.
- On 1 February 2008, the same unit 158856 collided with debris from an overline footbridge, which had just been accidentally demolished by a tipper lorry, near Barrow-upon-Soar. The lorry driver had forgotten to fully lower the tipper body after delivering materials to a site next to the railway, and drove into the footbridge, knocking its superstructure onto the track. The DMU hit the footbridge debris approximately one minute later. Three people including the driver were taken to hospital.
- On 22 January 2010, unit 158701 was derailed at Dingwall due to faulty points. One person sustained minor injuries.
- On 21 July 2013, unit 158774 was parked empty at Norwich when it was run into by 156402. Eight passengers were injured. The cause was driver error.
- On 1 April 2017, unit 158758 collided with the buffer stops at Preston at a speed of 6 mph (10 km/h). Fifteen people were injured. The cause was driver error.
- On 31 October 2021, a South Western Railway Class 159 unit, 159102, collided with Great Western Railway class 158 coupled units, 158762 and 158763, at Salisbury Tunnel Junction, immediately before Fisherton tunnel. A preliminary RAIB report found the cause was poor adhesion conditions which led to the SWR train over-running a signal set at danger. Unit 158763 was written off in the accident.
- On 6 February 2024, unit 158856 was involved in a third accident in which it collided with a fallen tree and was derailed between Thetford and Harling Road stations. One of the 31 passengers on board was injured. The RAIB opened an investigation into the accident.
- On 21 October 2024, two units 158824 and 158841 were involved in a head-on collision at Talerddig in Powys, in which one passenger died and 15 others were injured.

== Overseas sales ==
During 1990–1991, BREL built six three-car State Railway of Thailand ASR class units based on the Class 158 for the State Railway of Thailand.

== Fleet details ==
| Subclass | Operator | Qty. | Cars | Unit number |
|---|---|---|---|---|
| 158/0 | ScotRail | 40 | 2 | |
| 158/0 | Great Western Railway | 13 | 2 | 158745, 158747–158750, 158760, 158762, 158765–158769, 158771 |
| 158/0 | Great Western Railway | 5 | 3 | 158798, 158950–158962 (Note: Units numbered 158950 and above are subclass /0 units that have been lengthened to three coaches by adding a vehicle taken from other split-up subclass /0 units. The lengthened units remain in subclass /0 despite having been renumbered.) |
| 158/0 | East Midlands Railway | 26 | 2 | 158770, 158773–158774, 158777, 158780, 158783, 158785, 158788, 158799, 158806, 158810, 158812–158813, 158846–158847, 158852, 158854, 158856–158858, 158862–158866, 158889 |
| 158/0 | Northern Trains | 8 | 3 | |
| 158/0 | Northern Trains | 35 | 2 | |
| 158/0 | Transport for Wales | 22 | 2 | 158818-158823, 158825-840 |
| 158/0 | South Western Railway | 10 | 2 | |
| 158/0 | Scrapped | 1 | 2 | 158763 (Note: As a result of being damaged in the 2021 Salisbury rail crash.) |
| 158/0 | Converted to Class 159/1 | 8 | 3 | |
| 158/9 | Northern Trains | 10 | 2 | |

=== Named units and special liveries ===
Some units have received names:

- 158701 The Scottish Claymores (de-named)
- 158702 BBC Scotland - 75 Years
- 158707 Far North Line 125th Anniversary
- 158715 Haymarket
- 158720 Inverness & Nairn Railway - 150 Years
- 158745 Pont Britannia (de-named)
- 158747 Richard Trevithick (de-named)
- 158754 Settle & Carlisle 150
- 158797 Jane Tomlinson
- 158855 Exmoor Explorer (de-named)
- 158860 Ian Dewhirst (formerly Isambard Kingdom Brunel) (de-named)
- 158861 Spirit of the South West (de-named)
- 158864 ELR 50 VISIT LINCOLNSHIRE IN 2020
- 158773 Eastcroft Depot (de-named)
- 158784 Barbara Castle (de-named)
- 158791 County of Nottinghamshire
- 158796 Fred Trueman Cricketing Legend (denamed)
- 158797 Jame Tomlinson (de-named)
- 158844 The Northumbrian
- 158847 Lincoln Castle Explorer
- 158854 The Station Volunteer
- 158860 Ian Dewhirst
- 158861 Magna Carta 800 Lincoln 2015
- 158910 William Wilberforce (de-named)

In September 2025, unit 158903 was decorated with a special Railway 200 livery to celebrate 200 years of railways across the North.

=== Liveries ===
| Operating company | Livery |
|---|---|
| Regional Railways | |
| Northern Trains | |
| Arriva Trains Wales | |
| East Midlands Railway | |
| East Midlands Trains | |
| Great Western Railway | |
| South West Trains | |
| South Western Railway | |
| ScotRail | |
| Transport for Wales | |
