= 2021 Salisbury rail crash =

Railway crash in the United Kingdom

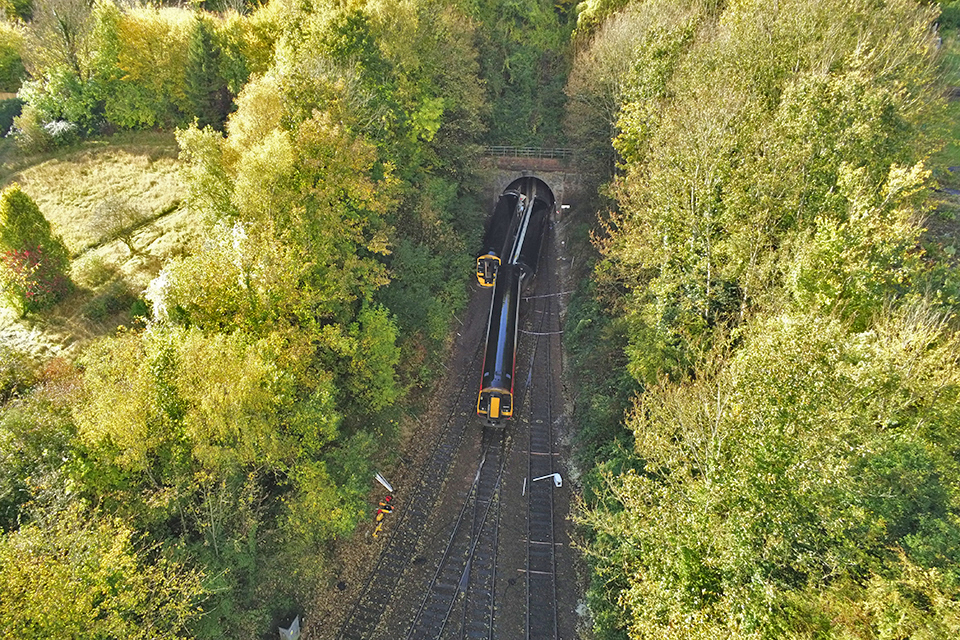
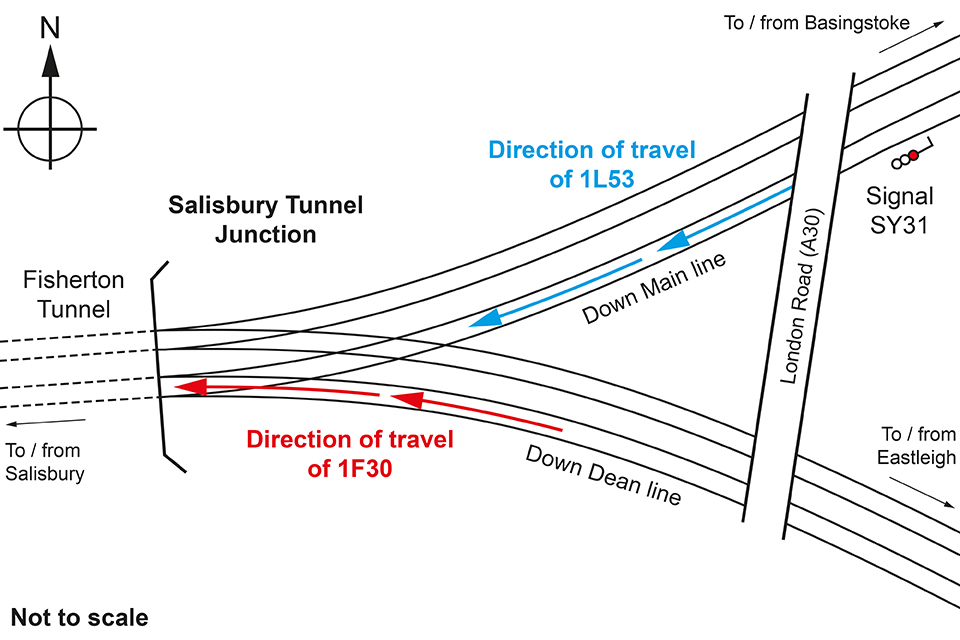
- Aerial view of the crashed trains Diagram of the crash by the Rail Accident Investigation Branch

Details
- Date: 31 October 2021; 18:45
- Location: Fisherton Tunnel; 1 mi (1.6 km) north east from Salisbury
- Coordinates: SU 150 309; 51°04′39.2″N 1°47′08″W
- Country: United Kingdom
- Line: Wessex Main Line; West of England Main Line
- Operator: Great Western Railway; South Western Railway
- Owner: Network Rail
- Service: Portsmouth Harbour–Bristol Temple Meads (GWR); London Waterloo–Honiton (SWR)
- Incident type: Sidelong collision and derailment
- Cause: Signal passed at danger due to low railhead adhesion and driver error

Statistics
- Trains: 2
- Passengers: 197
- Crew: 5
- Deaths: 0
- Injured: 14 (1 serious)
Location diagram

The Salisbury Rail Crash was a railway accident on 31 October 2021, at Salisbury, Wiltshire, United Kingdom. Two trains, travelling on converging lines, collided at Salisbury Tunnel Junction, approximately one mile (1.5 kilometres) northeast of Salisbury railway station. Fourteen people, including one of the train drivers, were taken to hospital.

== Incident ==
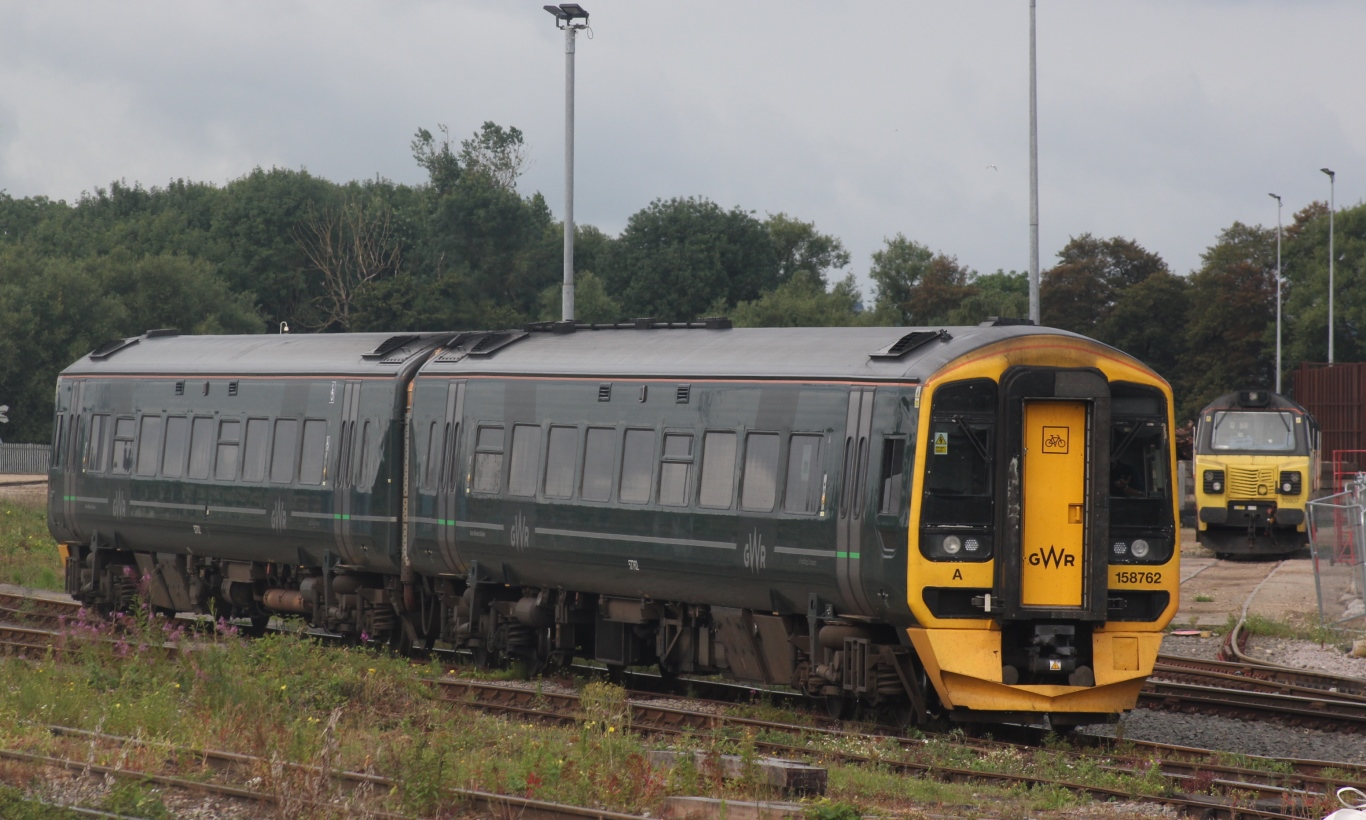
158762 pictured in 2021

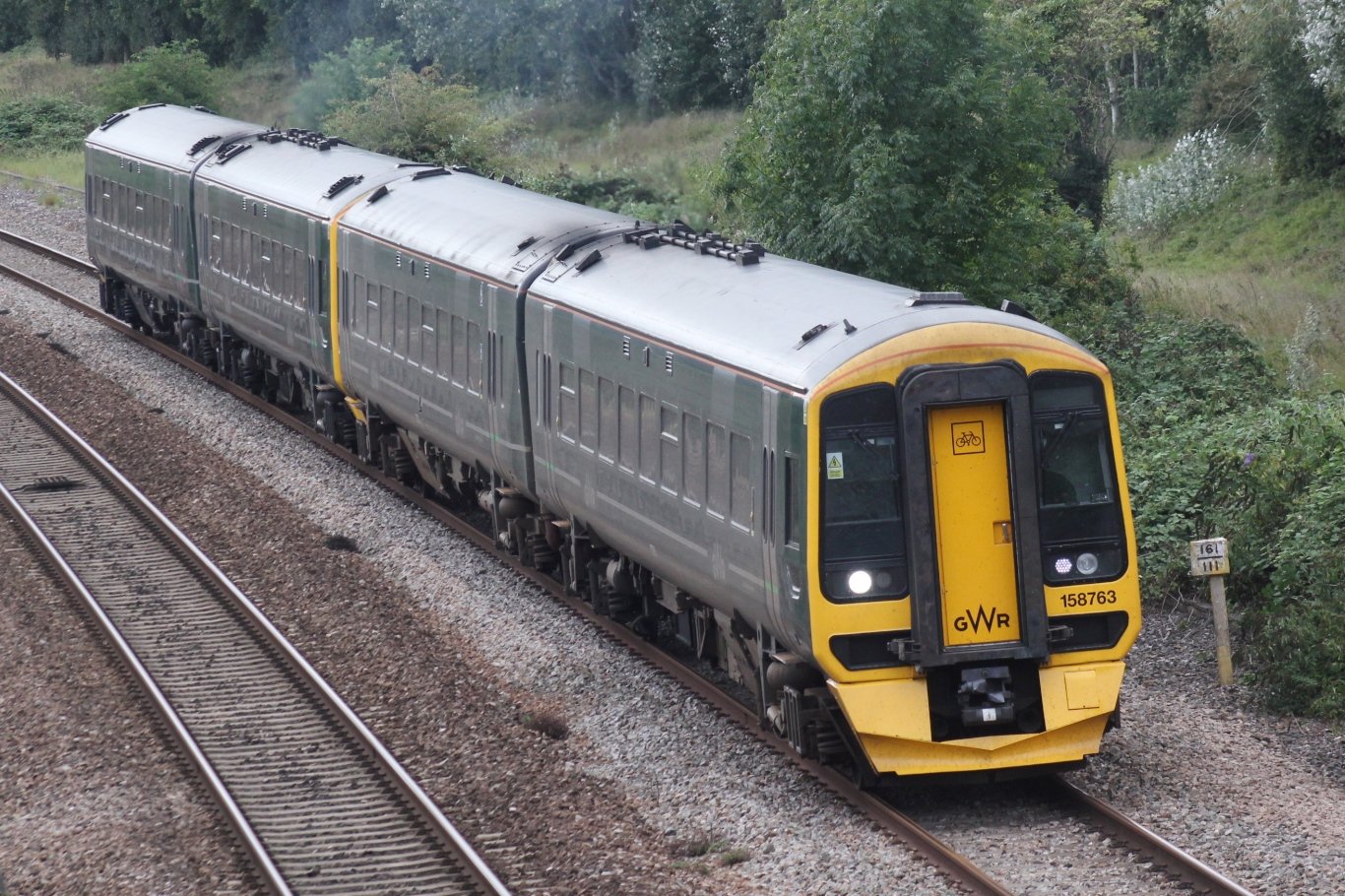
158763 (at front half) pictured in 2020

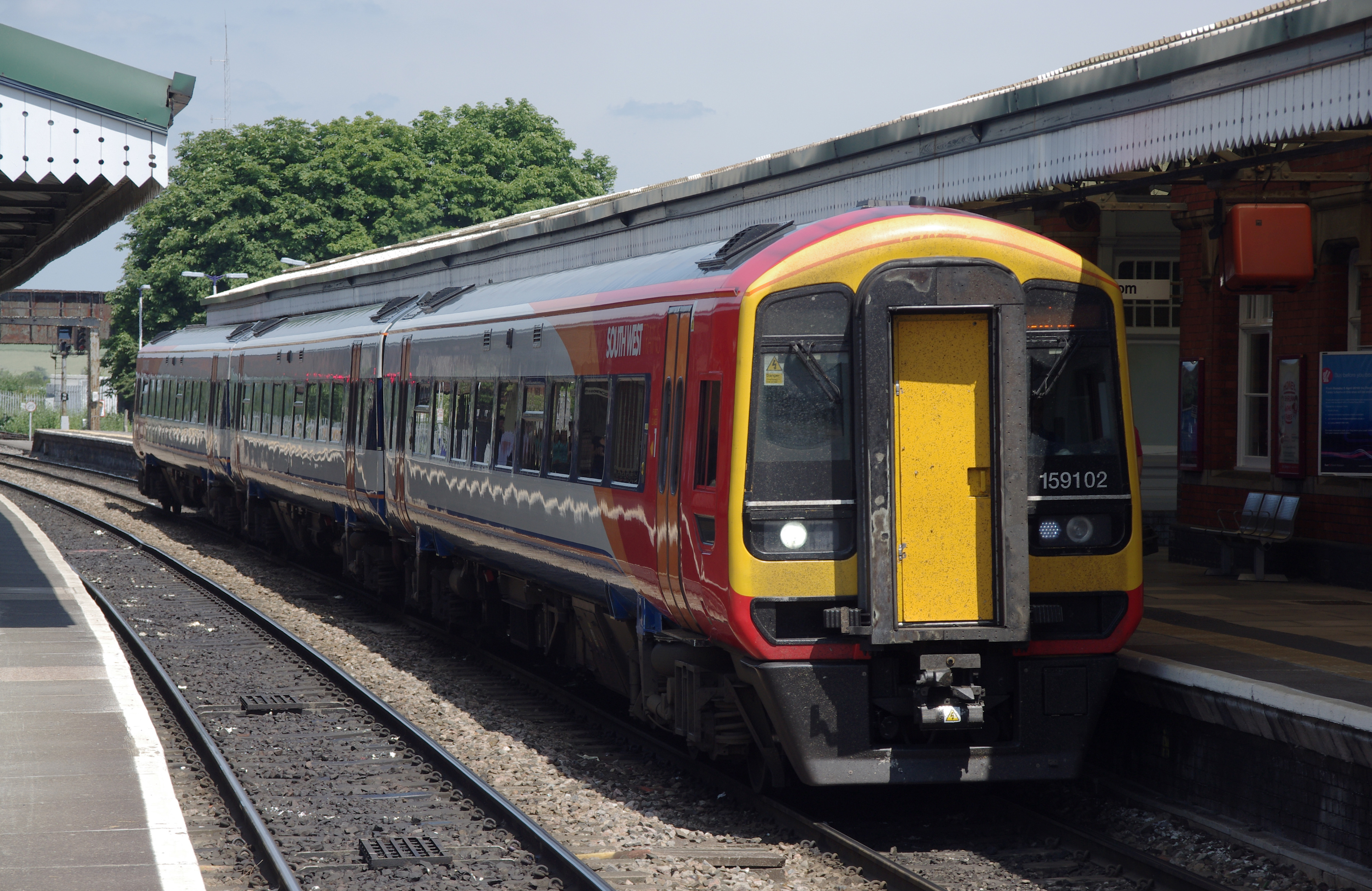
159102 pictured in 2010

On 31 October 2021, Great Western Railway's (GWR) 17:08 Portsmouth Harbour to Bristol Temple Meads four-carriage service (reporting number 1F30) operated by a pair of two-carriage Class 158s - 158762 and 158763, was passing through Salisbury Tunnel Junction where the Wessex Main Line converges with the West of England Main Line. At the same time, the South Western Railway's (SWR) 17:20 London Waterloo to Honiton service (reporting number 1L53) operated by a single three-carriage Class 159 - 159102, was approaching the junction. The SWR train failed to stop at signal SY31, 240 yards (220 m) from Salisbury Tunnel Junction, which was displaying a red aspect. GWR's 16:58 Bristol Parkway to Fratton service (reporting number 1F27) had passed clear of Salisbury Tunnel Junction, going towards Eastleigh, less than 40 seconds before 1L53 arrived at the junction.

At 18:45, the leading carriage of the SWR train collided with the side of the third carriage of the GWR train, causing both trains to derail as they entered Fisherton Tunnel. The rear two carriages of the GWR train and front two carriages of the SWR train were derailed. The SWR train was travelling at 52 miles per hour (84 km/h) at the time of the collision; the GWR train was travelling at 20 miles per hour (32 km/h).

Emergency services, including Wiltshire Police and the British Transport Police, attended the scene, as did the Dorset & Wiltshire Fire and Rescue Service who declared a major incident. National Police Air Service and HM Coastguard despatched helicopters to the scene. The railway lines through the tunnel were closed as a result of the incident.

The accident was the first involving a collision between two moving in-service passenger trains in the United Kingdom since the Ladbroke Grove rail crash on 5 October 1999.

=== Passengers and crew ===
Of the 197 passengers and five crew on board the trains, 13 were injured. All but one were taken to Salisbury District Hospital by ambulance. Four of those taken to hospital were admitted, with three of them being discharged later, and nine were treated for their injuries before being sent home. Thirty other people walked to a temporary casualty centre established in a local church. The driver of the SWR train was initially trapped in his cab before being freed and taken to hospital, where his injuries were described as life-changing. He was flown to Southampton General Hospital for treatment, and was released three weeks later.

== Aftermath ==
The accident closed both the Wessex Main Line and West of England Main Line, affecting services between Portsmouth Harbour and Westbury and between Basingstoke and Exeter St Davids respectively. Network Rail stated that the track at the junction required heavy refurbishment and that the track through the tunnel may also need to be relaid. Unit 158762, the leading unit of the GWR train, was not damaged and was removed by rail on 4 November. One of the remaining five carriages was also removed from the site that day. It was lifted from the railway by crane and removed by road. Class 59 locomotive 59003 was used to drag the remaining derailed carriages out of the tunnel. The A30 London Road was closed until 9 November to allow for the recovery of the carriages and for investigators to carry out their work. After repairs to the track, the line through the tunnel reopened on 16 November. The front carriage of 159102 was written off, as was unit 158763.

== Reporting of the story ==
Initial reports of the accident, based on a leaked Network Rail log, led to highly inaccurate reporting of the accident in its immediate aftermath. The Evening Standard reported that a derailed locomotive had been left a "sitting duck" for seven minutes after the rear carriage of a train derailed and was then run into by another train after signalling failed. Rail magazine editor Nigel Harris pointed out that the only facts in the story were the location and services involved. The leak led to the MailOnline reporting similarly, with a "senior Network Rail manager" quoted as saying:

According to my system, the signalling system was aware seven minutes before impact. It should've automatically stopped the train. It should've automatically set all signals to red. If the driver didn't see the signal, the system should've made the train stop.

An initial statement put out by Network Rail also contained inaccuracies. Although it was quickly corrected, Harris said that "the genie was already out of the bottle". The Network Rail log initially reported that the GWR driver had reported hitting an obstruction and derailing. The log was updated seven minutes later to record the collision, which is where the press got their "seven minutes sitting duck" scenario. Under the current system, train operating companies, the British Transport Police, and the Office of Rail and Road can all issue statements. Rail contributor Christian Wolmar also criticised the early coverage. In his opinion, the initial errors were made worse by Network Rail's Safety and Engineering Director Martin Frobisher, who appeared on BBC Radio 4's Today programme on 1 November and did not correct any of the errors at a time when, according to Wolmar, he must have known them to be untrue. Wolmar praised the Rail Accident Investigation Branch (RAIB) for publishing its initial report just three days after the accident.

== Investigations ==
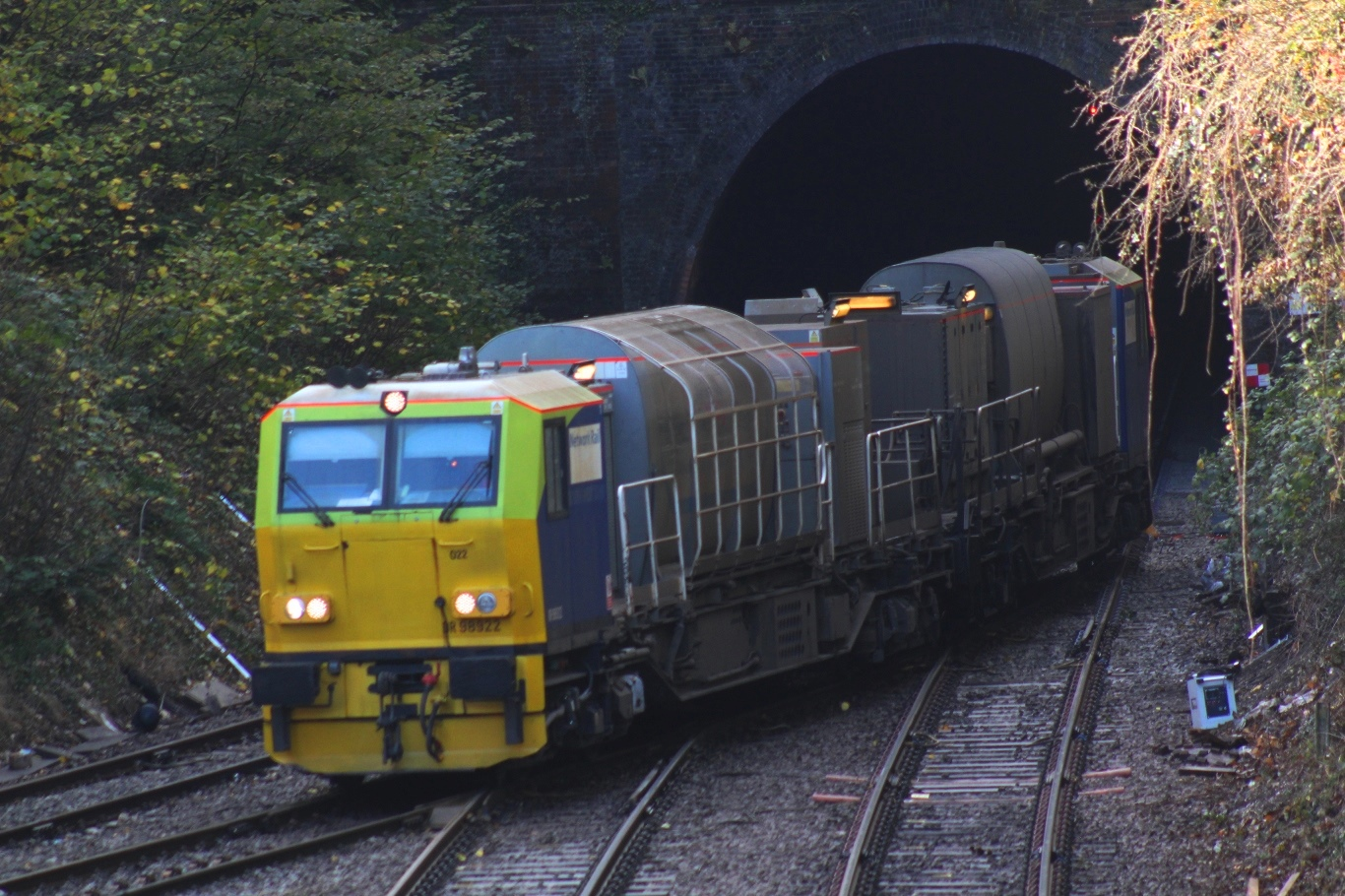
A Rail Head Treatment Train cleaning tracks at the crash site during a scheduled visit a few weeks later

The RAIB deployed a team of inspectors to the scene. The Office of Rail and Road also opened an investigation. The British Transport Police also opened an investigation.

On 2 November the RAIB stated that initial evidence indicated that, although the SWR driver had applied the brakes, his train had failed to stop at a signal and collided with the GWR train; wheel slide, as a result of low railhead adhesion, was the most likely cause. Announcing a formal investigation on 3 November, the RAIB said that the On Train Data Recorder showed that the driver had made an emergency brake application twelve seconds after he initially applied the brakes, and that a further emergency brake demand had been made by the Train Protection & Warning System fitted to the train.

RAIB said they would examine how Network Rail managed the risk of loss of adhesion at the track site and also any SWR policy for preventing or mitigating wheel slip on their trains. SWR commented that its driver had acted in an "impeccable way in a valiant attempt to keep passengers safe". The West of England Line had not had a Rail Head Treatment Train over it since 29 October, although one had been scheduled to travel over the line before the accident occurred. An interim report was published on 21 February 2022.

=== RAIB interim report ===
The interim report found that the driver of 1L53 approached signal SY29R at 90 mph (140 km/h) and shut off power. The line at this point was on a 1 in 169 falling gradient. The signal was displaying a double yellow aspect. About one mile (1.5 kilometres) past the signal the train was travelling at 86 mph (138 km/h) and a brake application was made and the wheels began to slide. A full service brake application was followed by an emergency brake application. As the train approached signal SY31, the overspeed sensor fitted to the train detected that the train was travelling in excess of the 34.5 mph (55.5 km/h) permitted when a red aspect was displayed and the TPWS demanded emergency braking, which was already being applied by the driver. The front carriage of 1L53 collided with the rear carriage of 1F30 at a speed between 52 and 56 mph (84 and 90 km/h).

The collision caused the coupling between units 158762 and 158763 to break. The unit at the front of the train was undamaged and came to a halt inside the tunnel. Both carriages of the unit at the rear of 1F30 were derailed against the tunnel wall. The front two of the three carriages of 159102 were derailed. The driver of 1L53 was knocked unconscious and trapped in his cab. The alarm was raised by the driver of 1F30 using the GSM-R radio system.

Subsequent analysis of the railway line approaching Salisbury Tunnel Junction revealed that the line was contaminated by the residue of fallen leaves between 80 miles 32 chains (129.39 km) and 82 miles 36 chains (132.69 km) (distances measured from London Waterloo). A coefficient of friction of between 0.2 and 0.02 was recorded, with most of the readings towards the lower end of the scale. The last Rail Head Treatment Train had passed over the line at 11:06 on 30 October, and the next one was scheduled to pass over at 23:00 on 31 October. The gap of 36 hours was in excess of Network Rail Wessex's requirement to treat the line at least once every 24 hours. On 27 June 2023, the RAIB reported that the draft of the final report had been sent to interested parties as part of the statutory consultation process. The final report would be issued following such consultation.

=== RAIB final report ===
The RAIB released their final report on 24 October 2023. Ten recommendations were made.

== See also ==
- 1906 Salisbury rail crash – excessive speed through a curve, 28 killed
- 2024 Talerddig train collision – a collision between two passenger trains in which low rail adhesion was a factor
