= British Rail Class 780 =

British multi mode train

- Replaced: Class 150; Class 155; Class 156; Class 158; (Planned)
- Number built: 161; (78 × 3-car sets 83 × 4-car sets); (Planned as of September 2025)
- Fleet numbers: TBA
- Capacity: 3-car sets 191 seats; 4-car sets 265 seats; (Planned as of September 2025)
- Operator: Northern Trains

Specifications
- Train length: 3 cars 69 m (226 ft 5 in); 4 cars 92 m (301 ft 10 in); (Planned as of September 2025)
- Maximum speed: 100 mph (160 km/h) (Planned as of September 2025)
- Axle load: Route Availability 3 (Planned as of 2025)
- Electric system: 25 kV 50 Hz AC overhead
- Current collection: Pantograph
- Safety systems: AWS; TPWS
- Track gauge: 1,435 mm (4 ft 8 1/2 in) standard gauge

The British Rail Class 780 is a planned fleet of three- and four-car Multi Mode (MMU) trains to be built for Northern Trains. Trains are expected to be built with three different modes of operation, these being overhead electrification, diesel and battery.

== History ==
In August 2023, Northern Trains issued a tender to acquire a contract for up to 450 new trains to replace the older rolling stock in their fleet. Northern noted that they have ten different types of train, with six of those (57 per cent) being over 30 years old – and therefore approaching the end of their life.

In 2024, a more detailed tender for up to 329 new trains was issued, and in January 2025, it was revealed that Northern had shortlisted five companies to build its new fleet – Alstom, Construcciones y Auxiliar de Ferrocarriles (CAF), Hitachi, Siemens and Stadler. In November 2025, an "Invitation to Submit a Final Tender" was sent to bidders, with an initial order of "around 130" trains expected. Contracts are expected to be awarded in 2026, with the first units delivered by 2031.

In September 2025, Modern Railways reported that the TOPS number 780 is reserved for the planned new MMU fleet. The Class 780 is planned to be built with three different modes of operation, these being overhead electrification, diesel and battery. It is planned for the Class 780 fleet to be able to be converted to either battery-electric (BEMU) or electric (EMU) multiple units during its service life.

== See also ==
- British Rail Class 781
