= British Rail Class 769 =

Multi-mode multiple unit train

British Rail Class 769 Flex
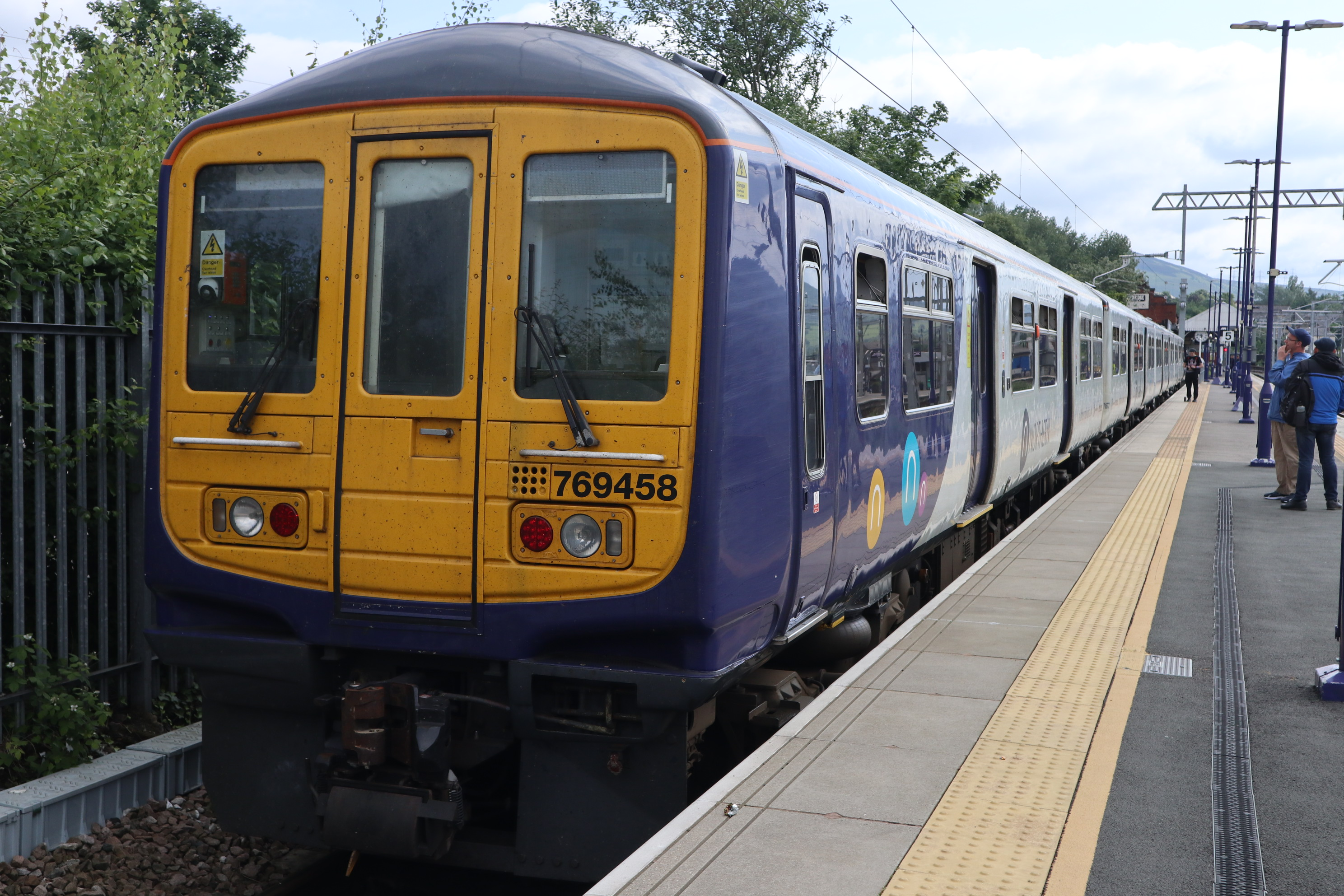
- Northern Trains Class 769 at Stalybridge in 2024.

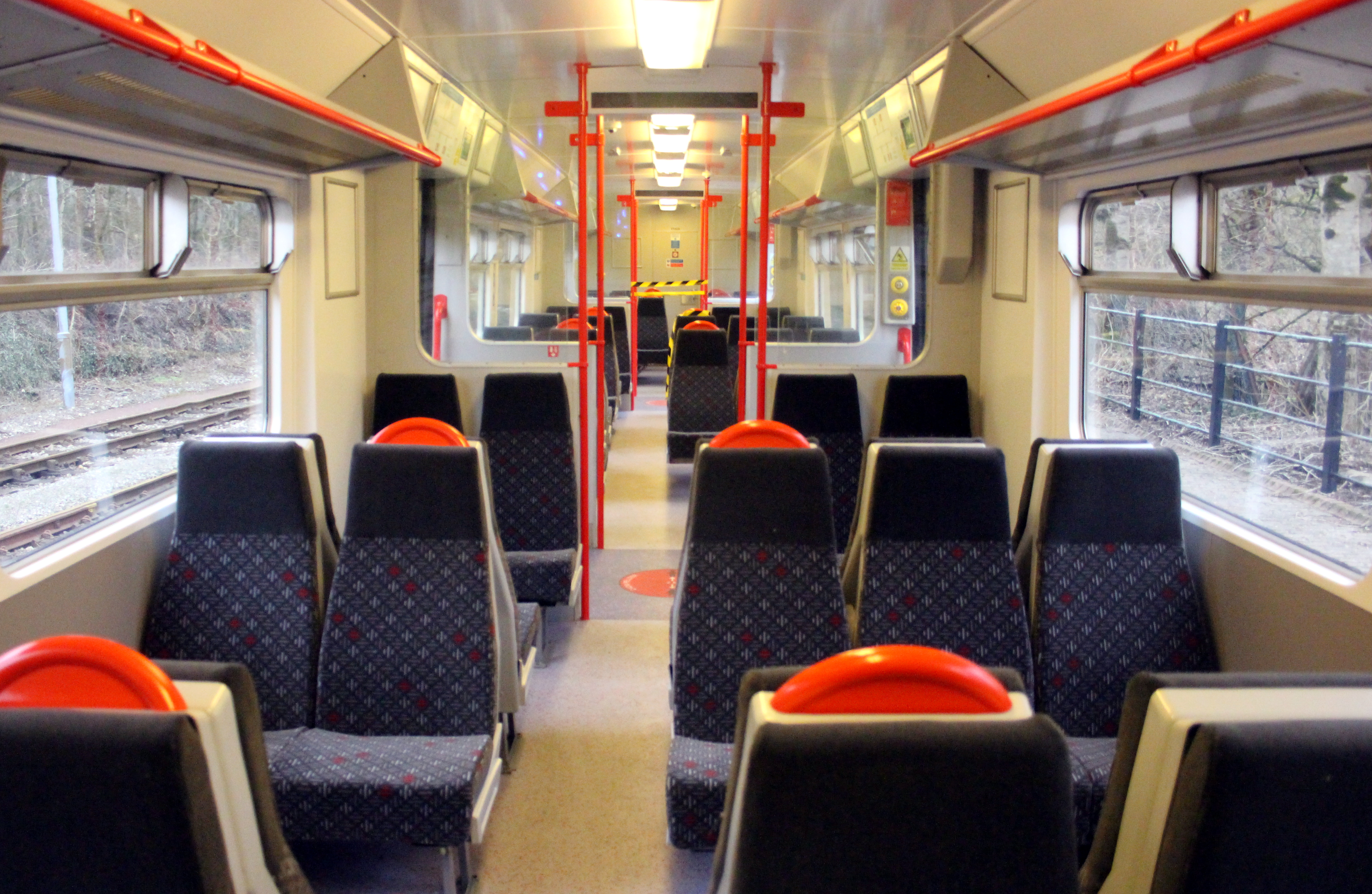
- Interior of a Transport for Wales unit
- In service: November 2020 – present
- Manufacturers: As Class 319: British Rail Engineering Limited; Conversion: Brush Traction
- Built at: BREL: York Carriage Works; Brush: Loughborough
- Family name: BR Second Generation (Mark 3)
- Replaced: Class 142; Class 143; Class 153
- Constructed: 1987–1988, 1990; (converted 2017–2021)
- Number in service: 9
- Number scrapped: 2
- Successor: Class 781 (Planned)
- Owner: Porterbrook
- Operators: Current: Northern Trains; Former: Transport for Wales Rail
- Depots: Current: Allerton (Liverpool); Former: Canton (Cardiff)

Specifications
- Car body construction: Steel
- Car length: DT vehs.: 19.83 m (65 ft 1 in); Others: 19.92 m (65 ft 4 in)
- Width: 2.82 m (9 ft 3 in)
- Height: 3.58 m (11 ft 9 in)
- Doors: Double-leaf sliding pocket, each 1.010 m (3 ft 3.8 in) wide (2 per side per car)
- Wheelbase: Over bogie centres: 14.170 m (46 ft 5.9 in)
- Maximum speed: 100 mph (161 km/h)
- Prime mover: 2 × MAN D2876 (one per DT vehicle)
- Engine type: Inline-6 4-stroke turbo-diesel with SCR
- Displacement: 12.8 L (780 cu in)
- Traction motors: 4 × GEC G315BZ
- Power output: 390 kW (520 hp) per engine
- Electric systems: 25 kV 50 Hz AC overhead; 750 V DC third rail
- Current collection: Pantograph (AC) (Note: Removed on former Transport for Wales units (all 769/0s plus 769421, 769445, and 769452).); Contact shoe (DC)
- UIC classification: 2′2′+Bo′Bo′+2′2′+2′2′
- Bogies: Powered: BREL P7-4; Unpowered: BREL T3-7
- Minimum turning radius: 70.4 m (231 ft 0 in)
- Braking system: Electro-pneumatic (disc)
- Safety systems: AWS; TPWS
- Coupling system: Tightlock
- Multiple working: Within class
- Track gauge: 1,435 mm (4 ft 8 1/2 in) standard gauge

The British Rail Class 769 Flex is a class of four-car bi-mode multiple unit (BMU) (Note: Some sources describe these units as having tri-mode capability, treating Class 319's dual-voltage support (using either AC or DC traction current supply) as being two separate supply modes.) converted by Brush Traction, and running in service with Northern Trains. The train is a conversion of the existing Class 319 electric multiple unit (EMU), a conventional unit type which had become surplus to requirements during the 2010s.

The conversion process was carried out by a partnership between the rolling stock leasing company Porterbrook and train manufacturer Brush Traction. The conversion principally involved the addition of a pair of MAN diesel engines (one under each driving trailer vehicle), the output of which is fed into ABB-provided alternators to power the existing electric traction systems. According to Porterbrook, the Class 769's performance under diesel power is either equal or superior to that of a Class 150 Sprinter diesel multiple unit (DMU), and the switchover between EMU and DMU modes can be carried out while the train is in motion. A parcels variant has also been produced, the Class 768.

== History ==
=== Background ===
The Class 319 units were built by BREL between 1987 and 1990 for Network SouthEast as dual-voltage units to run on Thameslink services. In late 2014, Govia Thameslink Railway began returning its allocation of Class 319 units to Porterbrook (the owner of the units) as they were gradually replaced by Class 387 units and then ultimately Class 700 units on Thameslink services. Twenty Class 319s were cascaded to Northern Rail and allocated to Allerton for use on the newly electrified lines between Liverpool Lime Street, Manchester Airport and Preston. A further twelve Class 319s were leased by Arriva Rail North in 2016.

In December 2016, Porterbrook announced a partnership with Northern to convert eight Class 319/4 units from electric multiple units to bi-mode multiple units (BMUs), aiming to provide a solution to cover for the shortage of diesel multiple units following the deferral of several electrification projects across the network. They were initially referred to as the Class 319 Flex, before being allocated the TOPS designation Class 769.

=== Concept ===
According to railway industry publication Rail Engineer, a key reason for the selection of the Class 319 as the basis for such a conversion was that the type had been subject to a recent programme of upgrades which had installed new passenger information systems and accessibility-friendly toilets with controlled emission systems. Engineers at Porterbrook, having been tasked with finding a new use for recently-surplus vehicles of the class, decided that there was an emerging market for a bi-mode suburban/regional train that could readily move between electrified mainlines and non-electrified adjoining routes.

During a detailed evaluation to determine a suitable independent power source for the type, Porterbrook decided that the desired performance and range of the vehicle would be at least equal to a Class 150 Sprinter diesel multiple unit (DMU). Furthermore, it was also determined that these trains would be capable of interchanging between electrified and non-electrified lines via a straightforward switchover process, including potentially while in motion. According to Porterbrook, efforts were made to make the driving experience as similar to the Class 319 as possible to make it an attractive option to prospective operators.

The use of various energy storage mediums, including batteries, flywheels, supercapacitors and hydrogen fuel cells were examined, but most were discarded due to the insufficient range provided. A lack of available refuelling infrastructure and risks posed over the approvals process were also present with the hydrogen option. A diesel power unit was selected due to its optimum performance across factors including range, weight, size, power density, and overall cost. According to Porterbrook, the selected engine should produce lower emissions and reduced maintenance costs, as well as a higher tractive effort at low speeds, than a Class 150 train due to its use of modern technology.

=== Details ===
According to industry publication Rail Engineer, detailed design work on the Class 769 was performed by a partnership between Porterbrook and Brush Traction, the latter having prior bi-mode vehicle experience with the British Rail Class 73 electro-diesel locomotive. Reportedly, over 60 engineers were involved in the design, which required in excess of 45,000 engineering hours to produce over 2,500 drawings, detailing more than 3,500 components involved in the conversion. Additional input was gathered from several of the original units' designers, which helped to compensate for missing and incomplete drawings.

At its core, the conversion work involves the fitting of a powerpack containing a Diesel engine and associated alternator underneath each of the driving trailer vehicles, which drives the existing traction apparatus via the DC bus along with a new return cable. The engine adopted is the MAN D2876, capable of generating up to 390 kW (520 hp) per engine; this powerplant is furnished with a selective catalytic reduction (SCR) system to reduce NOx emissions. An exhaust system is also necessitated for the engine, which uses a layout that is similar to that of a Class 150 DMU, as well as fire barriers and suppression systems to account for the added risk of fire presented by the powerpack.

The cab controls and circuit breakers have been changed to allow the driver to choose between diesel, overhead AC, or third-rail DC (where applicable) power sources. On the 769/9 subclass, conductive shoegear is fitted to the trailing bogies of the driving trailer vehicles, along with a new power bus and additional changeover contactors installed under the intermediate trailer car and motor car. Furthermore, new and modified electronic control units are also installed to regulate the Diesel engine's power output and to help it emulate the DC conductor rail. Overall, the modifications add approximately 7.5 tonnes to each driving trailer; the additional weight is evenly distributed across the underframe, which imposed several constraints and necessitated the relocation of the original heating equipment to make room. The original suspension and brakes have been adjusted to compensate for the presence of the additional mass.

=== Conversion and testing ===
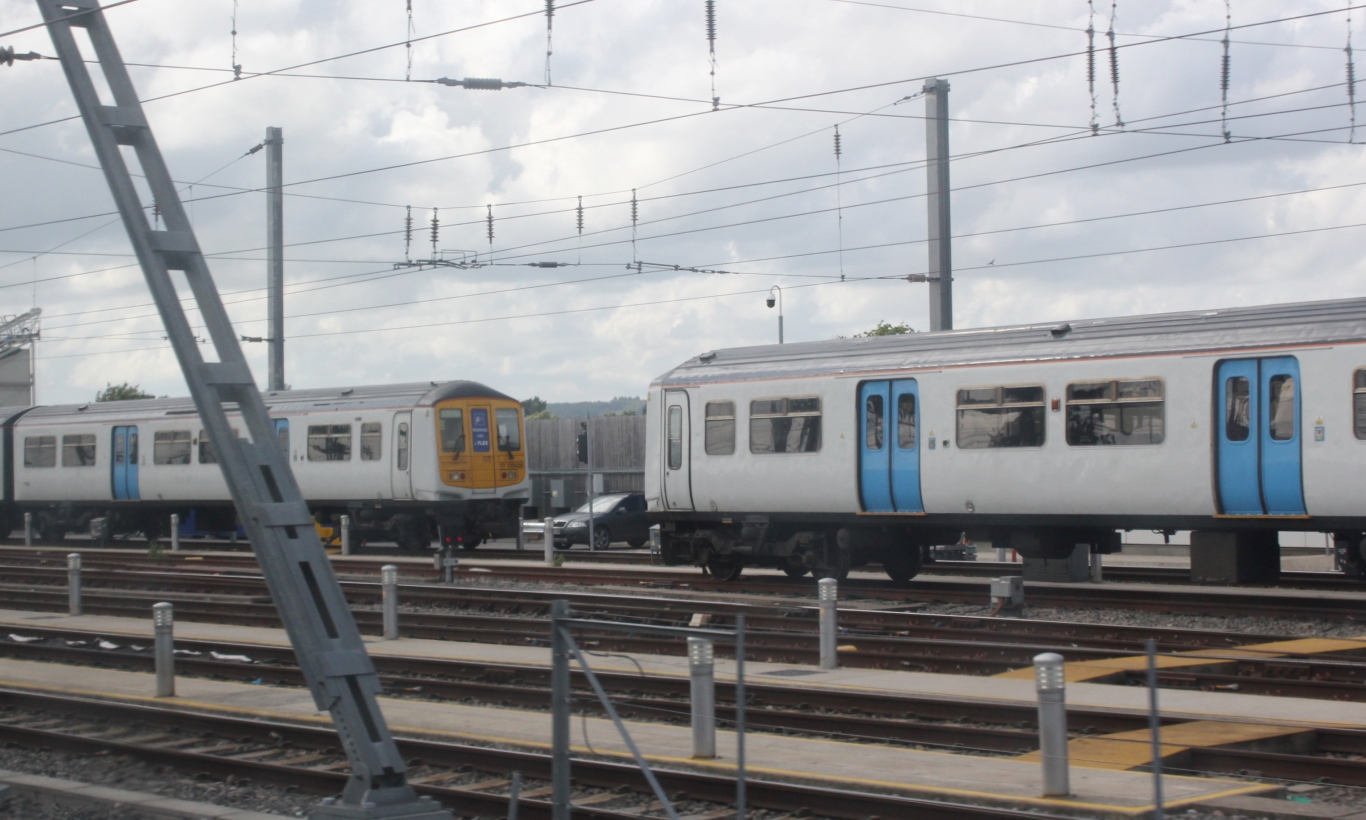
Class 319 units at Reading Traincare Depot waiting for conversion in 2019

Initially, eight units were selected to be converted for Arriva Rail North, with Porterbrook also marketing the Class 769 to other operators. In April 2017, the first two units to be converted, 319434 and 319456, arrived at Brush Traction's facility in Loughborough. The majority of the conversion work, including all major elements, was carried out at Brush Traction Loughborough facility. On the initial eight trains converted, work such as reliability improvement, re-branding and other modifications were undertaken by Knorr-Bremse Rail Services (KBRS). For all subsequent trains, all works other than core Flex conversion tasks were performed by KBRS.

Testing of the first Class 769 towards securing type approval was originally planned to take place at the Great Central Railway in November 2017. Testing was later than expected but trials were underway in November 2018.

According to Rail Engineer, as the bi-mode conversion is neither considered to be an upgrade nor a renewal, it did not require authorisation under the current standardised safety method for risk evaluation and assessment; however, this process was voluntarily applied to reassure customers of the vehicle's safety. In 2018 Rail Engineer reported that based upon demand for the Class 769, Porterbrook had ambitions to pursue further conversion programmes. In that same year Rail Engineer reported that engineers at the Porterbrook had evaluated other vehicle classes for the Flex conversion scheme, including a hybrid concept based on the Class 455 DC-powered EMU, which was speculated to include new three-phase AC traction systems, regenerative braking, and battery storage to capture this regenerated energy and from the Diesel engines.

== Current operations ==
=== Northern Trains ===
Arriva Rail North (trading as Northern) were to be the first operator of the Class 769, with eight units (although Transport for Wales introduced a set into traffic first). Northern indicated that the use of Class 769s would provide the most benefit on routes which are partially electrified, as they would be able to use their pantograph to operate on electrified routes while still being able to operate away from the overhead lines by employing their diesel engines.

The eight Northern units are stabled at Allerton TMD, with the first unit delivered there in December 2018, but along with a second delivered set, it was returned to Doncaster.

Originally scheduled to begin entering service with previous Northern franchise operator (Arriva Rail North) in May 2018, they were later expected to start operating in the first half of 2019. Northern planned to deploy its Class 769s on services between Wigan North Western, Alderley Edge and Stalybridge. Northern had stated their intention to extend these services from Wigan to Southport from December 2019. Previously, there were plans to operate Class 769 units on the Lakes line.

The Class 769s entered service with government-owned operator Northern Trains in May 2021.

In 2025, Northern took two former Transport for Wales Class 769 units to cover some of their units under overhaul.

== Former operations ==
=== Transport for Wales ===
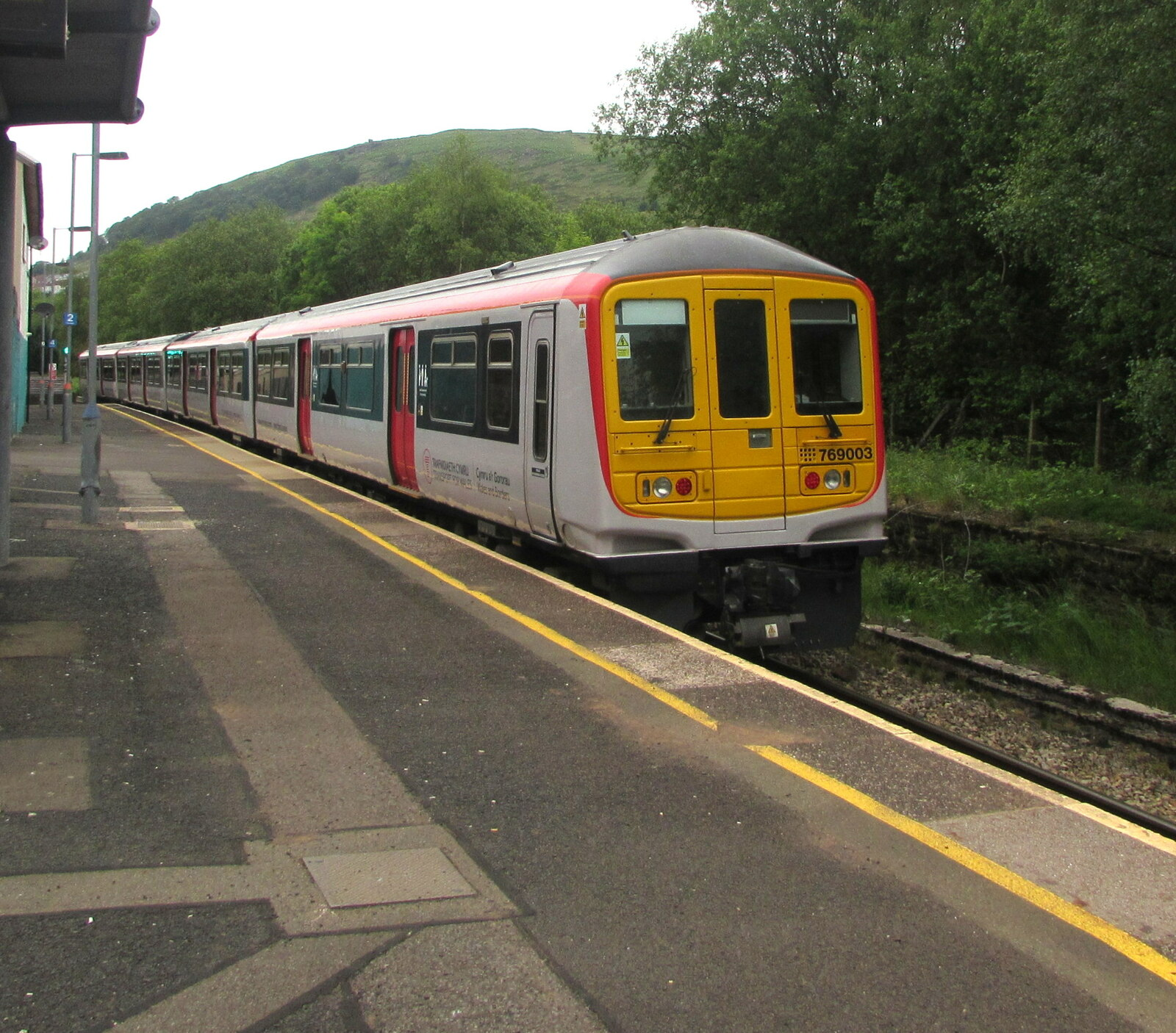
Class 769 at Brithdir station

In July 2017, five units were ordered by the Welsh Government for the Wales & Borders franchise, to enable Class 150 and Class 158 diesel multiple units to be released from service to undergo modifications to comply with PRM regulations, as well as allowing the company to increase its fleet capacity. Transport for Wales held an option for a further four, which they took up in November 2018.

Transport for Wales' allocation of nine Class 769s were converted from five Class 319/0 and four Class 319/4 units, with the former being the ones ordered under Arriva Trains Wales and the latter being the optional extras selected by TfW Rail. The first unit, 769002, was delivered to Cardiff Canton depot in March 2019. The class first entered service in November 2020.

Transport for Wales Rail withdrew the last of its Class 769 fleet on 19 May 2023.

== Abandoned operations ==
=== Great Western Railway ===
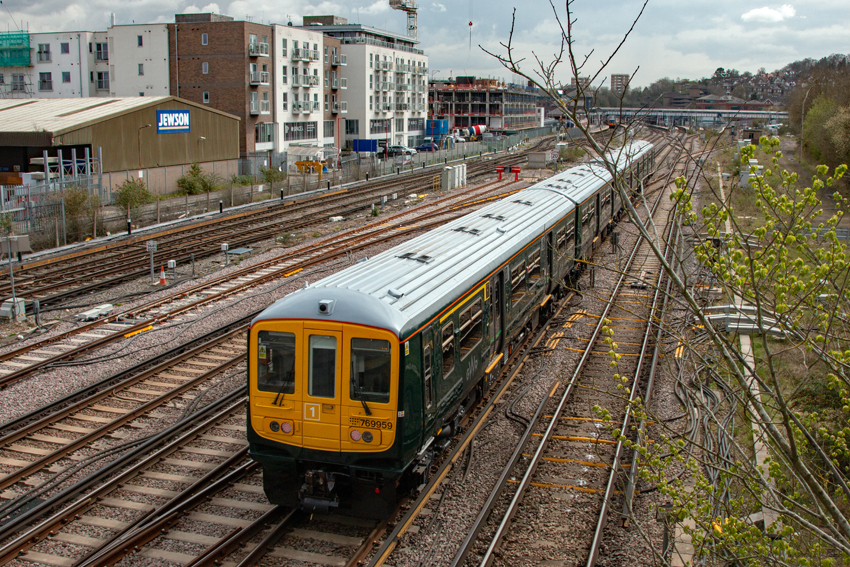
GWR Class 769/9 on trials at Guildford in 2022

It was planned for Great Western Railway to operate nineteen Class 769/9 units, enabling the cascade of Class 165 and 166 Turbo units to the Bristol area and Class 158 units into Devon and Cornwall. The operator intended to run the first services in spring 2019, but this was delayed by issues faced by Porterbrook in converting the units.

Although planned for use initially in London and the Thames Valley while 12 Class 387 units were modified for Heathrow Express services, the future plan for these units was to operate services between Oxford, Reading and Gatwick Airport, which would have meant operating on non-electrified, 25 kV AC OHLE and 750 V DC third-rail routes. To enable this, GWR's allocation of Class 769 units retained their dual-voltage capability in addition to being fitted with diesel power units. The units also received an internal refurbishment and were fitted with air cooling.

The first Class 769 to be delivered to GWR was 769943, which was delivered to Reading TMD in August 2020. It was expected to enter the service in early 2021, but this was later pushed back to between June and December 2021, and then delayed further to 2022.

In December 2022, GWR announced that the introduction of the Class 769 fleet would be abandoned due to a cut in service levels, cancelling the lease and handing all 19 units back to Porterbrook in April 2023.

== Future operations ==
=== Freight ===
In June 2024 it was announced that two of the former Great Western Railway Class 769/9s were to be converted to parcels use.

=== Passenger ===
In June 2025, Go-op confirmed it was in discussions to lease Class 769 units.

As of April 2026, Alliance Rail have plans to launch a service from Marchwood to Southampton and London Waterloo using Class 769 units.

== Fleet details ==
Class	Operator	Qty.	Year converted	Unit numbers
769/0	Stored	5	2019–2020	769002–769003, 769006–769008
769/4	Northern Trains	9	2017–2020	769421, 769424, 769431, 769434, 769442, 769448, 769450, 769456, 769458
769/4	Stored	3	2020	769426, (Note: Vehicle 77340 scrapped.) 769445, 769452
769/4	Scrapped	1	2020	769426 (Note: Vehicle 77340 scrapped.)
769/5	Stored	2	2020–2021	769535, 769549
769/9	Stored	16	2020–2021	769923, 769925, 769927-769928, 769930, 769932, 769936-769940, 769943-769944, 769946-769947, 769959
769/9	Scrapped	1	2020–2021	769922
