= Go-op =

Train operating company in England

Overview
- Franchises: Open-access operator; Not subject to franchising; December 2025 – December 2030
- Main route: Weston-super-Mare - Taunton - Frome - Westbury - Swindon
- Fleet: Class 769 (proposed)
- Headquarters: Taunton

Other
- Website: www.go-op.coop
Route map

Go-op Co-operative Ltd., branded as Go-op, is an open access train operating company, proposing to operate services in South West England between Swindon, Taunton and Weston-super-Mare. It aims to become the first cooperatively owned train operating company in the United Kingdom, to improve access to the public transport infrastructure through open access rail services linking main lines to smaller market towns, and by co-ordinating services with light rail, bus links and car pools. In November 2024, Go-op's proposals were approved by the Office of Rail and Road, subject to certain conditions.

== Structure ==
As a co-operative, Go-op is to be owned and run by its employees and customers. Shares are available to the general public, with holdings restricted to between £500 and £20,000 per shareholder. Passengers hold 50 per cent of the vote in general meetings, with employees holding a further 25 per cent, and other investors holding the remainder.

== First proposal ==
Around 2010, the company created a draft timetable which offered four return trips between Yeovil Junction and the Midlands, via Yeovil Pen Mill, Castle Cary, Frome, Westbury, Trowbridge, Melksham, Chippenham, Swindon and Oxford, with three of those services being extended to Birmingham Moor Street.

The timetable proposed an early morning service from Yeovil to Birmingham, catering for business travellers, followed by a commuter service from Westbury and Trowbridge to Swindon and Oxford. Later services to Birmingham would cater for the leisure market. There were plans to extend the route further south to Weymouth, however it was acknowledged that for this to happen extra trains would be required. Go-op estimated that around 750,000 people live within 2 km (1.2 mi) of stations on the proposed route, excluding Birmingham.

Go-op intended to begin operating rail services in the spring of 2014, but difficulties in obtaining rolling stock and severe financial difficulties incurred by their main partner The Co-operative Bank delayed these plans.

== Light rail ==
One of the company's original aims was to look at developing links into existing mainline rail routes, by developing light rail services on existing branch lines. Routes in and around Yeovil, Oxford and Weymouth were considered, but rejected due to the technical difficulty of turning the routes into viable public transport links.

The co-operative had planned to operate a 'trial' service at some time during early 2011, from Medstead & Four Marks to Alton, over part of the Mid-Hants Railway. The shuttle services, branded as Go-op Mid-Hants Link, and utilising rolling stock from Parry People Movers, would connect with South West Trains main line services to Farnham, Woking and Alton. Five trains were scheduled in each direction, with morning trains from Medstead & Four Marks to Alton and evening trains from Alton back to Medstead & Four Marks. The trial was to be run in conjunction with Hampshire County Council and East Hants District Council. Technical issues with the Parry People Mover caused the trial to be postponed and it has yet to take place.

Another line considered was the Ludgershall branch, near Andover on the border between Wiltshire and Hampshire. The line south of the former station in the town remains open for freight traffic, namely the delivery of MOD equipment to Salisbury Plain.

Over time, the company hopes to establish shuttle bus services, car clubs and bike hire to improve links with the rail network.

== Second proposal ==
In 2016, Go-op lodged an application with the Office of Rail and Road (ORR) to operate a service between Taunton and Swindon, via Castle Cary, Bruton, Frome, Westbury, Trowbridge, Melksham and Chippenham. The company initially proposed to operate Class 185s before purchasing a fleet of Class 195s. A revised plan in June 2016 proposed services from 2019 between Taunton and Nuneaton, via Swindon and Oxford.

== Third proposal ==
In March 2019, the company announced new proposals for services from Taunton and Yeovil to Swindon, Oxford and Nuneaton. The Taunton and Yeovil to Swindon service would run from Summer 2020 and provide a significant increase in the number of trains serving towns such as Frome and Melksham.

The proposal consists of four trains per day between Taunton and Oxford, calling at Castle Cary, Bruton, Frome, Westbury, Trowbridge, Melksham, Chippenham and Swindon. There would also be two trains per day between Nuneaton and Yeovil Pen Mill, calling at Coventry, Kenilworth, Leamington Spa, Banbury, Oxford, Swindon, Chippenham, Melksham, Trowbridge, Westbury, Frome, Bruton and Castle Cary. The ORR website records withdrawal of the proposal for an Economic Equilibrium Test for this service in September 2019.

== Fourth proposal ==
In 2021, Go-op began discussions with Network Rail for services between Swindon and Bishops Lydeard (just beyond Taunton), which it hoped to begin in mid-2022. At first there could only be three services per day, due to congestion between Swindon and Westbury; a further three could be provided to Frome or Westbury, connecting with existing services to Swindon. These plans would also improve local services on the TransWilts Line, calling at Trowbridge and Melksham.

The plans for Bishops Lydeard would restore the link broken in 1971 between the national network and the preserved West Somerset Railway, which runs leisure services to Minehead.

== Fifth proposal ==
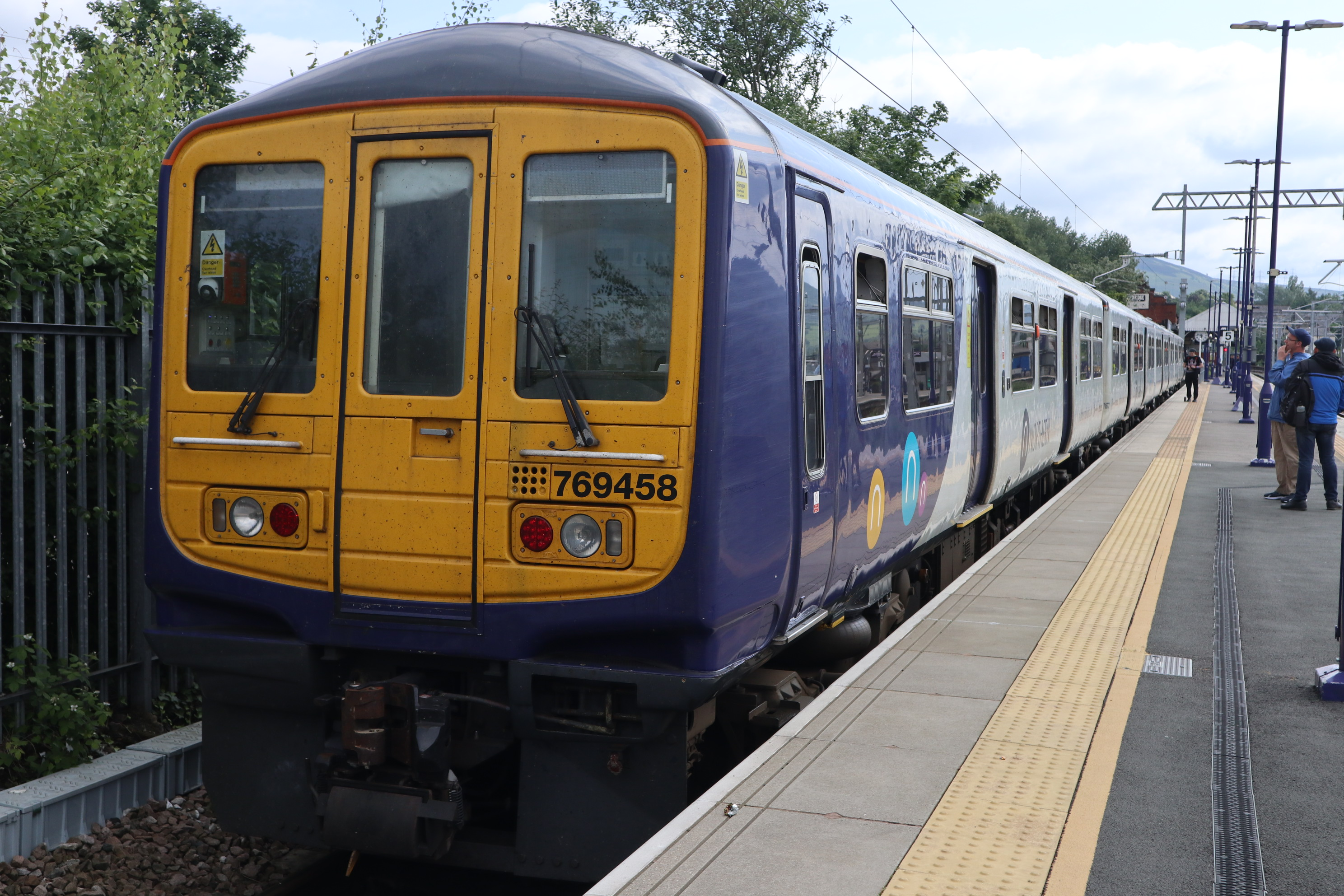
A Class 769 Flex operated by Northern Trains, similar to those proposed for use on Go-op services.

In 2022, Go-op abandoned plans to run services from Bishops Lydeard and made a new application to the ORR. In 2023, Go-op expected to begin services in December 2025. In November 2024, the ORR gave conditional approval for services between Swindon, Taunton and Weston-super-Mare, subject to financial and rolling stock requirements, to begin no later than December 2026. In June 2025, Go-op signed a track access contract with Network Rail and are in discussions to lease Class 769 trains. They are continuing to seek investors to raise £2.5 million needed to launch services.
