= British Rail Class 781 =

British battery electric train

- Replaced: Class 769; (Planned)
- Number built: 8; (Planned as of September 2025)
- Fleet numbers: TBA
- Capacity: 265 seats; (Planned as of September 2025)
- Operators: Northern Trains

Specifications
- Train length: 92 m (301 ft 10 in); (Planned as of September 2025)
- Maximum speed: 100 mph (160 km/h) (Planned as of September 2025)
- Axle load: Route Availability 3 (Planned as of 2025)
- Electric system(s): 25 kV 50 Hz AC overhead
- Current collection: Pantograph
- Safety system(s): AWS; TPWS
- Track gauge: 1,435 mm (4 ft 8 1/2 in) standard gauge

The British Rail Class 781 is a planned fleet of four-car battery electric multiple unit (BEMU) trains to be built for Northern Trains.

== History ==
In August 2023, Northern issued a tender to acquire a contract for up to 450 new trains to replace the older rolling stock in their fleet. A more detailed tender for up to 329 new trains was issued in 2024, and in January 2025, it was revealed that Northern had shortlisted five companies to build its new fleet - Alstom, CAF, Hitachi, Siemens and Stadler.

Contracts are expected to be awarded in 2026, with the first units delivered by 2032.

In September 2025, Modern Railways reported that the TOPS number 781 is reserved for the planned new BEMU fleet.
