= British Rail Class 150 =

British class of diesel multiple unit trains

British Rail Class 150 Sprinter
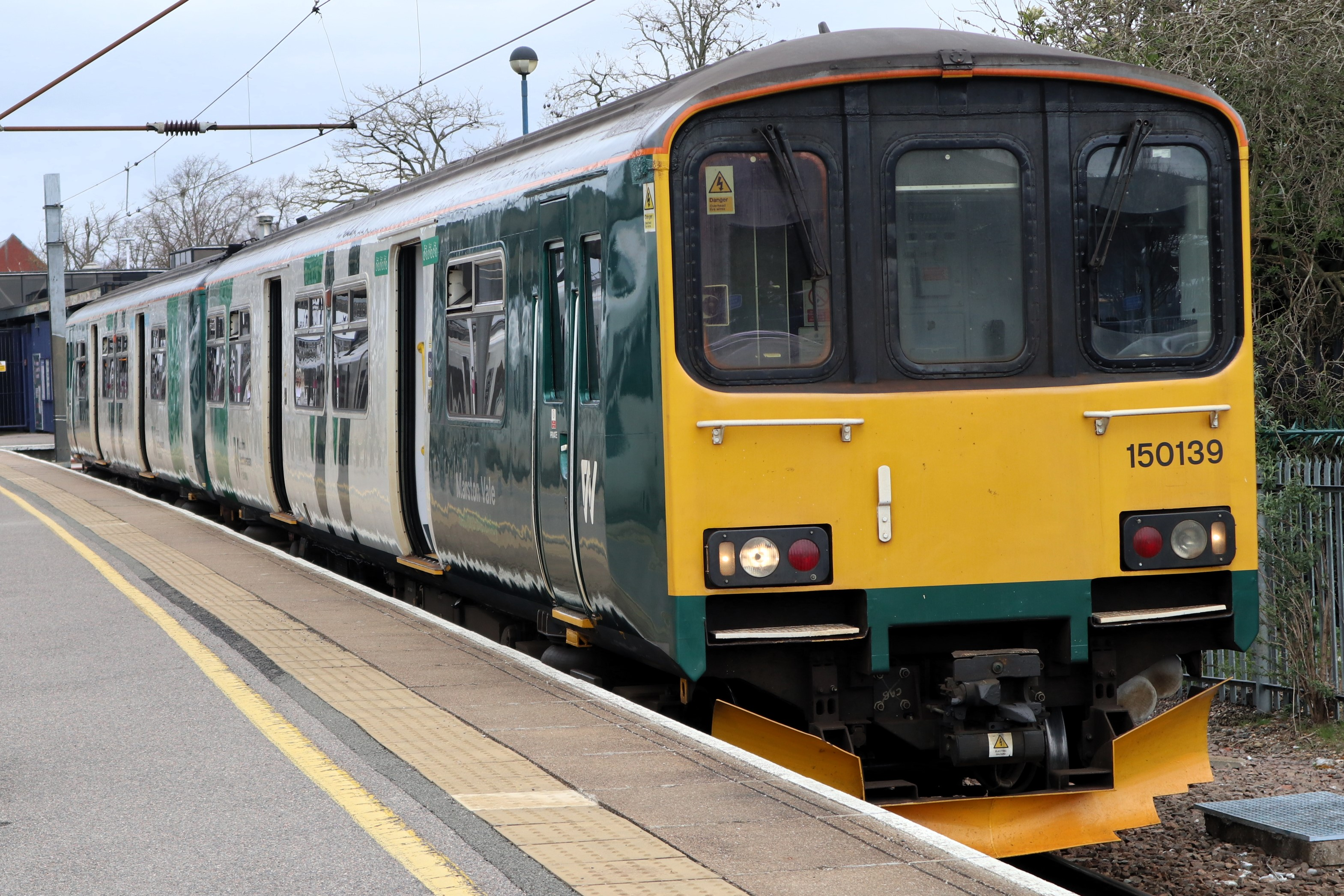
- London Northwestern Railway Class 150 at Bedford in 2024

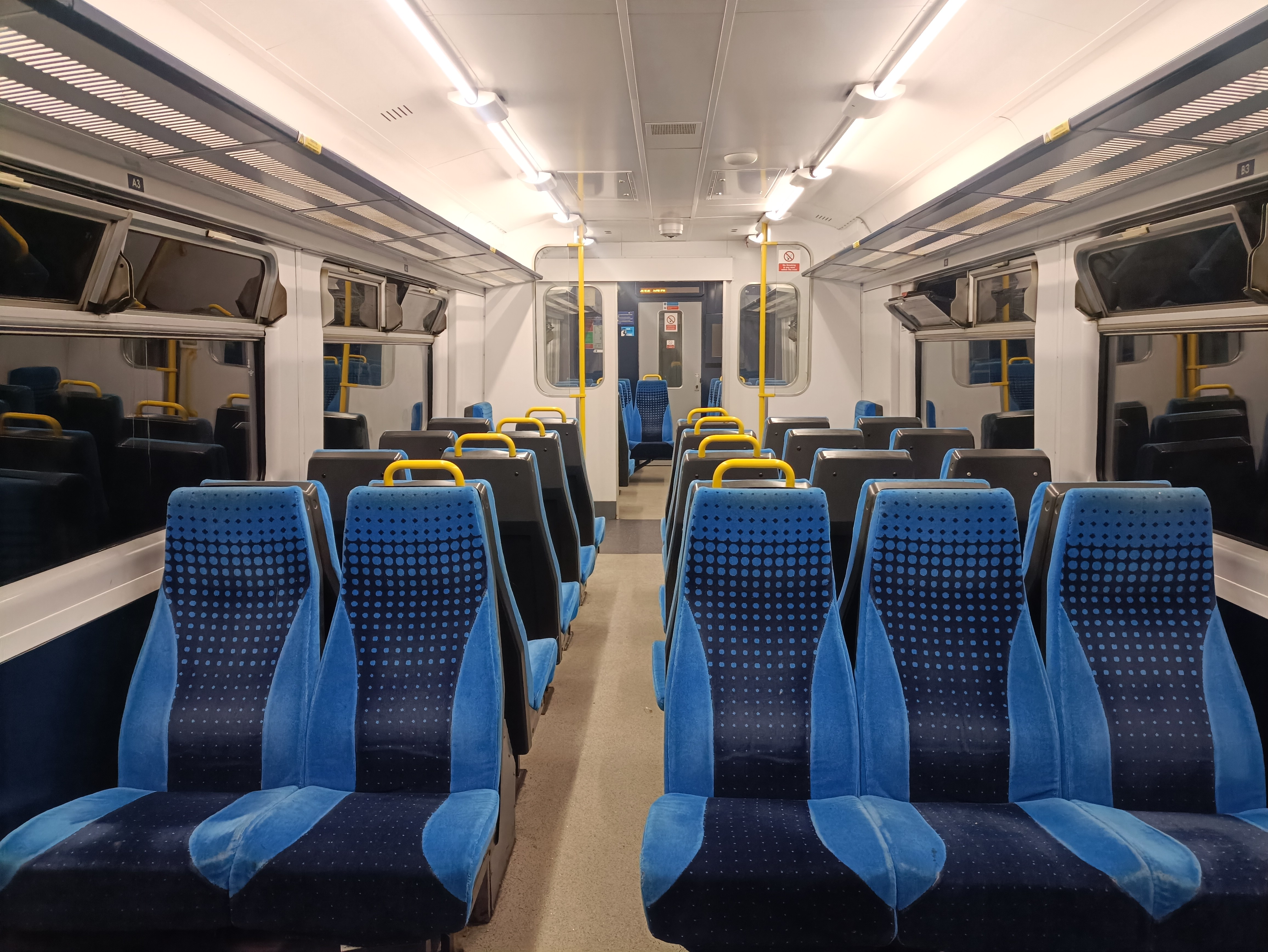
- Interior of a refurbished Northern Trains Class 150/1
- In service: 5 November 1984–present
- Manufacturer: British Rail Engineering Limited
- Order nos.: 30884 (150/0 DMSL vehicles), 30885 (150/0 DMS vehicles), 30986 (150/0 MS vehicles), 31011 (150/1 DMSL vehicles), 31012 (150/1 DMS vehicles), 31017 (150/2 DMSL vehicles), 31018 (150/2 DMS vehicles)
- Built at: York Carriage Works
- Family name: Sprinter
- Replaced: BR First-Generation DMUs; Class 230
- Constructed: 1984–1987
- Number built: 137
- Number in service: 116
- Number preserved: 1
- Number scrapped: 12 units (equivalent)
- Successor: Class 170; Class 172; Class 197; Class 230; Class 398; Class 780 (planned)
- Formation: 2 or 3 cars per unit: DMSL-DMS or DMSL-MS-DMS
- Diagram: 150/0 DMSL vehicles: DP230; 150/0 DMS vehicles: DP231; 150/0 MS vehicles: DR202 & DR203 (Note: The 150/0 Cummins- and Rolls-Royce-powered DMSL and DMS vehicles are described by variations of the relevant master diagrams as the vehicles are otherwise identical, but the MS vehicles have different diagrams because there are significant differences in the seating layout between them.); 150/1 DMSL vehicles: DP238; 150/1 DMS vehicles: DP239; 150/2 DMSL vehicles: DP242; 150/2 DMS vehicles: DP243
- Fleet numbers: 150/0: 150001–150002, 150/1: 150101–150150, 150/2: 150201–150285
- Capacity: NT: 124, 131 or 149 seats; GWR: 147 seats
- Operators: Current: Great Western Railway; Northern Trains; Transport for Wales; West Midlands Trains; Former; First North Western; Arriva Trains Northern; Northern Rail, Arriva Rail North; Wales & West, Wessex Trains; Wales & Borders; Arriva Trains Wales; ScotRail (National Express); First ScotRail; Anglia Railways; One; Silverlink; London Overground Rail Operations; Central Trains; London Midland
- Depots: Current: Bletchley (Milton Keynes); Canton (Cardiff); Exeter; Laira (Plymouth); Neville Hill (Leeds); Newton Heath (Manchester); Penzance; Former: Etches Park (Derby); Haymarket (Edinburgh); St Philip's Marsh (Bristol); Tyseley (Birmingham)

Specifications
- Car body construction: Steel
- Car length: 150/0 and /1 vehicles: 19.930 m (65 ft 4.6 in); 150/2 vehicles: 19.741 m (64 ft 9.2 in) (Note: 150/2 vehicles have bodyshells that are 189.5 mm (7.46 in) shorter than those of preceding subclasses, to allow for the protrusion of the front gangway. All vehicles of all subclasses have an overall length of 20.060 m (65 ft 9.8 in) when their respective gangway portions are included.)
- Width: 2.816 m (9 ft 2.9 in)
- Height: 3.774 m (12 ft 4.6 in)
- Floor height: 1.144 m (3 ft 9.0 in)
- Doors: Double-leaf pocket sliding (2 per side per car) (Note: Throughway width of 1,010 mm (3 ft 4 in) for 150/0 vehicles, 1,130 mm (3 ft 8 in) for 150/1 and /2 vehicles.)
- Wheelbase: Bogies: 2.600 m (8 ft 6.4 in); Bogie centres: 14.170 m (46 ft 5.9 in)
- Maximum speed: 75 mph (120 km/h)
- Weight: Vehicles as built: 150/0 DMSL: 35.8 t (35.2 long tons; 39.5 short tons); 150/0 MS: 34.4 t (33.9 long tons; 37.9 short tons); 150/0 DMS: 35.6 t (35.0 long tons; 39.2 short tons); All 150/1: 36.5 t (35.9 long tons; 40.2 short tons); 150/2 DMSL: 37.5 t (36.9 long tons; 41.3 short tons); 150/2 DMS: 36.5 t (35.9 long tons; 40.2 short tons)
- Prime movers: Unit 150001: 3 × Cummins NT855-R4; Unit 150002 before 1986: 3 × Rolls-Royce C6 305R; 150/1 and /2 units: 2 × Cummins NT855-R5; (all one per car)
- Engine type: Cummins: inline-6 4-stroke turbo-diesel; Rolls-Royce: diesel
- Displacement: Cummins: 14.0 L (855 cu in) per engine
- Power output: 213 kW (286 hp) per engine
- Transmission: Unit 150001 and all /1 & /2 units: Voith T 211 r (hydrokinetic); Unit 150002 before 1986: SCG R.500 (epicyclic)
- UIC classification: 2-car units: 2′B′+B′2′; 3-car units: 2′B′+B′2′+B′2′
- Bogies: BREL; 150/0 powered: BX8P; 150/0 unpowered: BX8T; 150/1 & /2 powered: BP38; 150/1 & /2 unpowered: BT38
- Minimum turning radius: 70 m (230 ft)
- Braking systems: Electro-pneumatic (tread) ('Westcode' 3-step)
- Safety systems: AWS; TPWS
- Coupling system: BSI
- Multiple working: Within class, and with Classes 14x, 15x, and 170
- Track gauge: 1,435 mm (4 ft 8 1/2 in) standard gauge

The British Rail Class 150 Sprinter is a class of diesel-hydraulic multiple unit passenger trains; they were developed and built by British Rail Engineering Limited at York Carriage Works between 1984 and 1987, for use on regional services across Great Britain. The type is a second-generation design, built to more modern standards and based on British Rail's Mark 3 body design for longer-distance services. It was developed alongside the lower-cost Pacers, which were built using bus parts for use on short-distance services. Two prototype units were built, followed by 135 production units in two batches. Further members of the Sprinter group were developed subsequently and introduced to service, including the Class 155, Class 156, Class 158 and Class 159.

== Background ==
By the beginning of the 1980s, British Rail (BR) was operating a large fleet of first-generation DMUs of various designs. While formulating its long-term strategy for this sector of its operations, BR planners recognised that there would be considerable costs incurred by undertaking refurbishment programmes necessary for the continued use of these ageing multiple units, particularly due to the necessity of handling and removing hazardous materials such as asbestos. In light of the high costs involved in retention, planners examined the prospects for the development and introduction of a new generation of diesel multiple units (DMUs) to succeed the first generation.

In the concept stage, two separate approaches were devised, one involving a so-called railbus that prioritised the minimisation of both initial (procurement) and ongoing (maintenance and operational) costs, while the second was a more substantial DMU that could deliver better performance than the existing fleet, particularly on long-distance services. The initial specification developed for the latter type was relatively ambitious for the era, calling for a maximum speed of 90 mph (140 km/h), a rate of acceleration comparable to contemporary electric multiple units (EMUs), the ability to couple/work in multiple with existing EMUs, facilitate through-access for passengers, feature pressure ventilation, the ability to assist another failed unit and to comprise either a three or four-car consist.

This specification led to the development of the experimental Class 210 diesel-electric multiple unit. However, to deliver the performance specified, it was found that relatively expensive equipment had to be used, particularly to provide sufficient speed, acceleration and through-passenger access; it also had maintainability problems due to space limitations. Despite these shortcomings, it was recognised that a production fleet that was assembled from proven components would possess both a greater reliability level and lower maintenance costs; it was forecast to achieve an availability rate of 85 percent. As such, the type had sufficiently demonstrated a promising reduction in maintenance costs was achievable, especially once initial teething problems were dealt with, as well as the wider value represented by a new generation of DMUs in the reduction of ongoing costs for BR.

By 1983, experience with the Class 210 had influenced planners to favour the procurement of a new generation of DMUs, but also to adopt a new set of specifications somewhat less demanding than the prior set. Specifically, it was decided to lower the top speed from 90 to 75 mph (145 to 121 km/h), as testing had shown that the higher rate brought no perceptible improvement in journey times due to the typically short distances between the stations that the type was intended to serve. Furthermore, it was determined that a propulsion system delivering 7 hp (5.2 kW) per tonne would deliver sufficient acceleration. The requests for compatibility with other rolling stock were eliminated, although auto-coupling and auto-connecting functionality were added. In addition to a good ride quality, the specification included a sound level of 90 dB when at full speed, an operational range of 1,000 miles (1,600 km) and an interval between major overhauls of five years or 350,000 miles (560,000 km).

In comparison to the previous generation of DMUs, which typically used a pair of engines for each power car, the new generation DMU would use only a single engine per car; sufficient cooling was also provided that even with one failed engine, a two-car unit could continue to perform typical services without incurring a major performance deficit. From an operational perspective, it was intended that the DMU could be assembled akin to building blocks, comprising between two and four cars that may or may not be outfitted with various passenger amenities such as toilets and luggage spaces.

Initially formalised as a business specification, these requirements were transferred into a relatively broad technical specification that avoided any specifics other than those deemed essential for compatibility purposes. Thereafter, it was issued to various rolling stock manufacturers for a competitive tender. As part of this process, these manufacturers submitted bids to construct an initial series of three-car prototypes as demonstration units. A relatively constrained timetable of 18 months from the date of order to delivery of these prototypes was also specified; this has been blamed for restricting manufacturers to existing industrial practices for their submissions.

In response to the specification, several submissions were received by BR. The bid submitted by British Rail Engineering Limited (BREL) was heavily based on its successful Class 455 EMU, sharing its body and the majority of its running gear, albeit equipped with two different power trains. The railway engineering company Metro-Cammell also bid, offering its own design that employed rivetted aluminium construction; this feature was credited with enabling a meaningful reduction in weight over conventional methods. BR officials quickly opted to proceed with a pair of prototypes from both BREL and Metro-Cammell, issuing orders to these manufacturers thenceforth.

== Design ==
The Class 150 is a two- or three-car diesel multiple unit. The steel bodyshell is shared with the Class 455 suburban EMU, with doors at 1/3 and 2/3. With the exception of units 150001 and 150002 in their original prototype configurations, each vehicle in the unit is powered by an underframe-mounted 14.01-litre (855-cubic-inch) Cummins six-cylinder turbo-diesel engine that develops 213 kW (286 hp). The engine drives a Voith T 211 r hydrokinetic transmission that in turn drives both axles on the inner bogie via a Cardan shaft and Gmeinder GM 180 final drive unit. The design speed is 75 mph (121 km/h). The majority of units are formed of a DMS (Driving Motor Second - numbered 57xxx) vehicle and a DMSL (Driving Motor Second Lavatory - numbered 52xxx) vehicle. Both vehicles are single class while the DMSL contains the toilet. The two prototype units were built as three-car sets with the addition of a MS (Motor Second) vehicle. In common with other non-intercity stock of the time, the trains lack air conditioning, ventilation being provided though opening hopper windows. As built, passenger seating was in a 3+2 configuration.

The second batch of production vehicles featured a new cab with gangway connection along with a revised interior.

== Prototypes ==
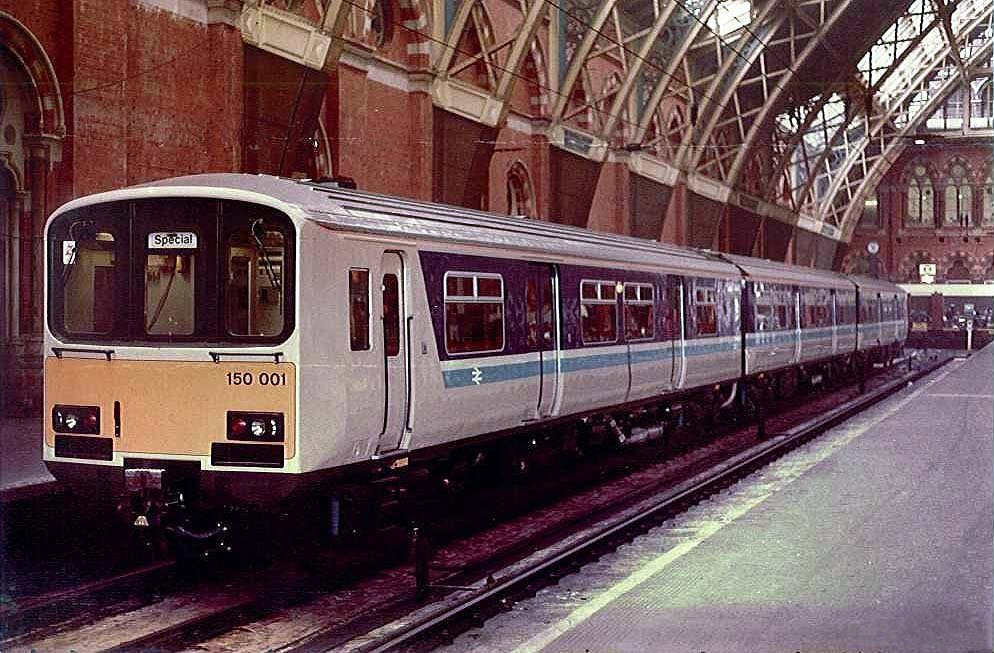
During a demonstration run in the summer of 1985, unit 150001 stands at platform 7 at St. Pancras

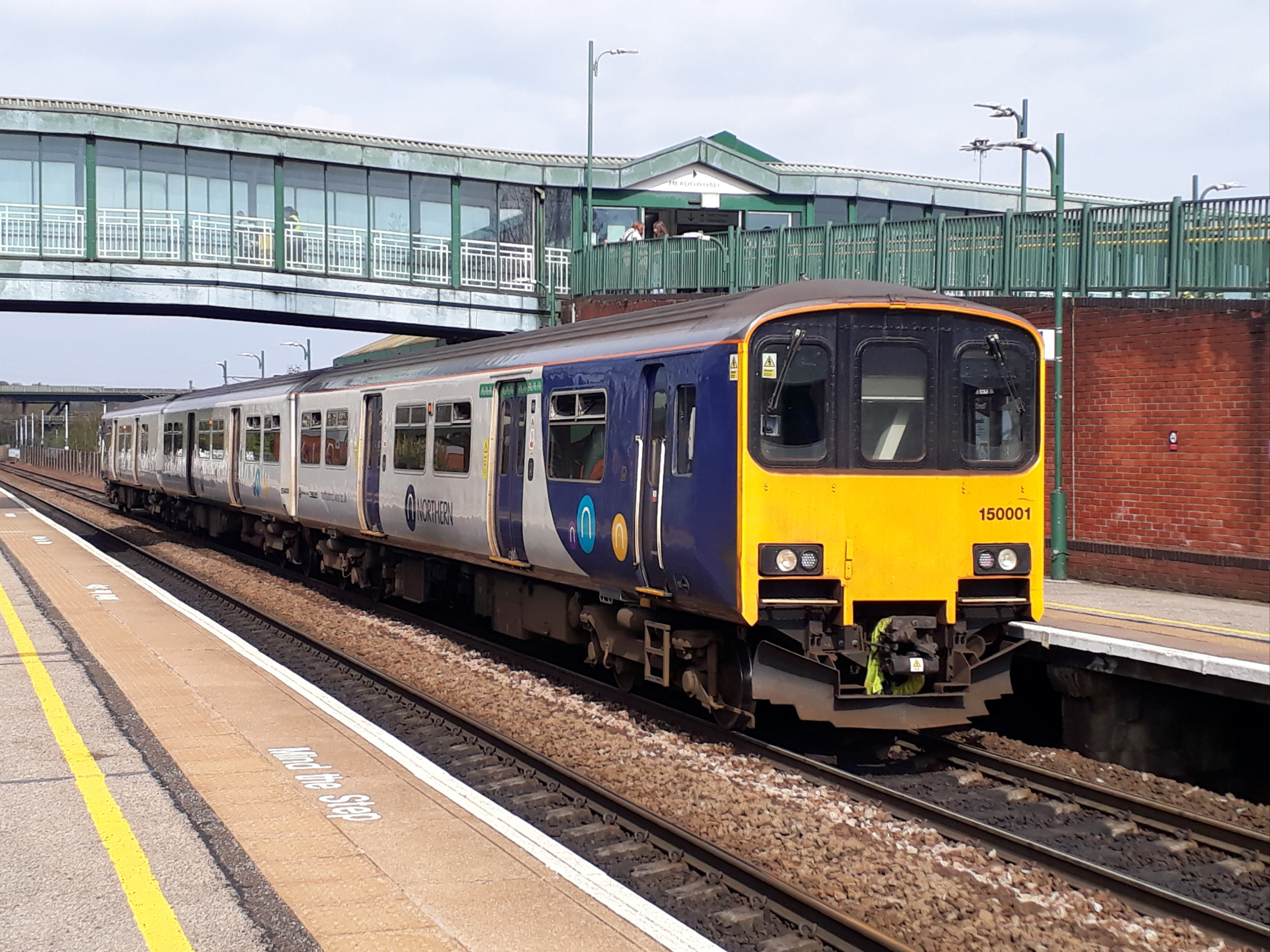
Northern Trains 150001 at Meadowhall in 2023

During 1984, BREL constructed a pair of prototype three-car Class 150/0 units, numbered 150001 and 150002; the first unit was delivered to BR only 15 months following the date of order. 150001 was fitted with Cummins engines and Voith hydraulic transmission, and 150002 was fitted with Perkins (Rolls-Royce) engines and a fully automatic gearbox developed by the Self-Changing Gears company. Other than the power train, the two units were identical.

The design specifications of the prototypes were similar to the later production units, but they were to remain as the only Class 150s to be built as three-car units. Additional three-car units were created later by re-marshalling a 150/2 car in the middle of a 150/1 set, but only the prototypes had purpose-built centre cars without driving cabs. Both cab doors are air-operated, unlike the Class 150/1 production model, but seen later on in the 150/2 variant.

Unit 150002 proved to be the worse of the two for reliability and was consequently chosen for use as the testbed for the Class 158. It was regeared to a maximum speed of 90 mph (140 km/h) and fitted with Cummins engines and Voith transmission, and with a Class 158 interior. One car was fitted with the Class 151 twin disc hot-shift transmission, which it used successfully, once the control software was sorted out. To distinguish this unit, it was reclassified as the Class 154. It has since been returned to the standard configuration and reverted to its original number. Both prototypes were still in service with London Midland until 2011. Unit 150001 entered service with First Great Western in January 2012, with 150002 to follow after refurbishment and relivery. Units 150001 & 150002 then operated for Great Western Railway; the former was based at Bristol's St. Phillips Marsh Depot, primarily working the Bristol Parkway-Weston Super Mare route; 150002 was based at Exeter St. Davids Depot and mainly operated the Riviera Line alongside Class 143 Pacers. In April 2020, both units transferred to Northern Trains' Newton Heath Depot. Both units have since entered into service, initially being used mainly on the Manchester Victoria - Todmorden - Blackburn diagram, and subsequently on Rochdale - Manchester - Bolton - Clitheroe services. And now operate Huddersfield-Sheffield and Sheffield-Moorthorpe-Leeds services.

At the same time that BREL built the 150/0s, Metro-Cammell built two prototype Class 151 units at its Washwood Heath plant. (Note: Further information about the testing and early days of the 150 prototypes with links to the 151s and 154 DMUs at "Class 150 Sprinter Prototype". Archived from the original on 22 August 2006.) The two types of unit were exhaustively tested, with a view to placing further orders for the more successful. These tests revealed that the Class 150 had exceptional ride quality, as well as fully meeting the 50 percent engine-out performance requirements. In the event, the two Class 150 units proved to be more reliable and, as a result, an order for 50 two-car units was placed with BREL.

== Production units ==
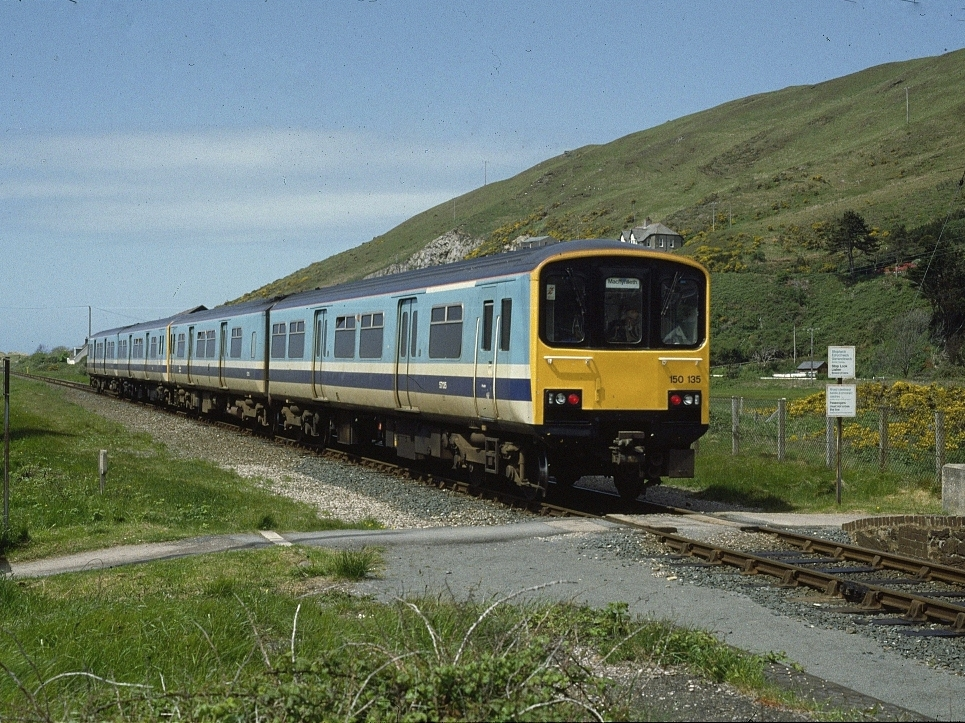
Class 150/1

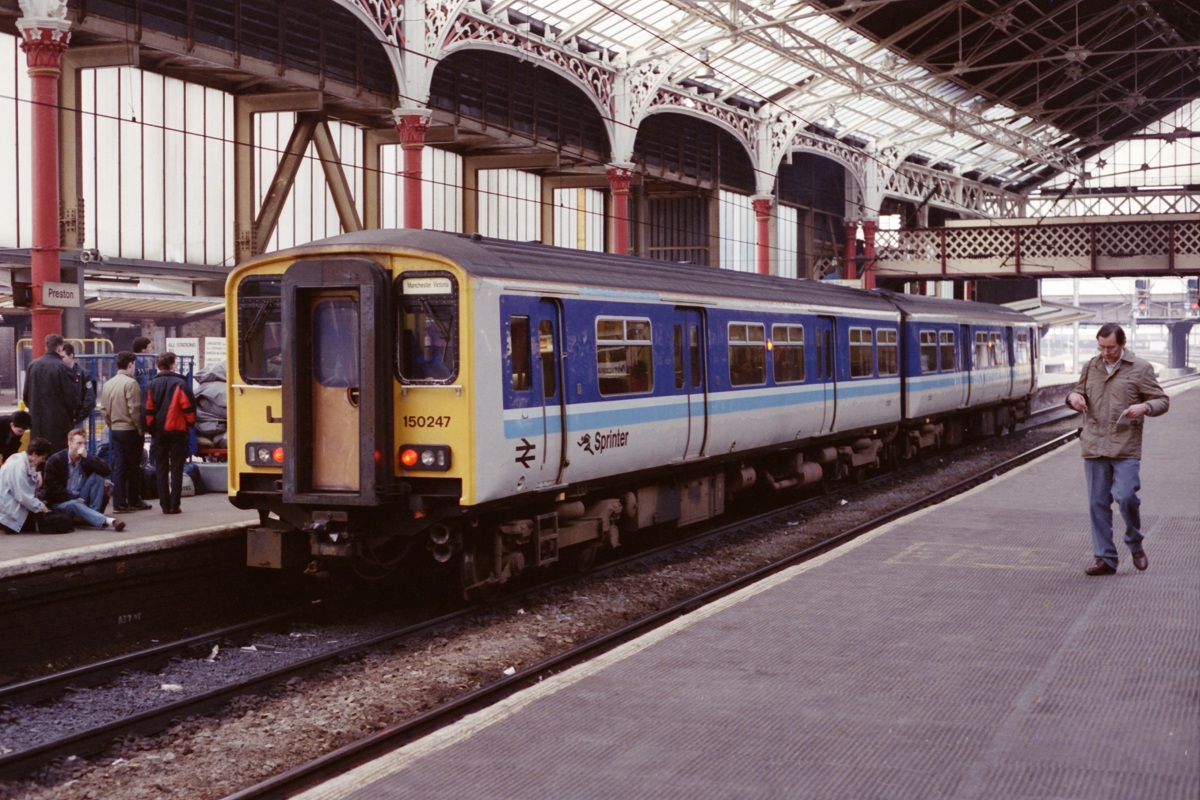
Class 150/2 in BR Sprinter livery

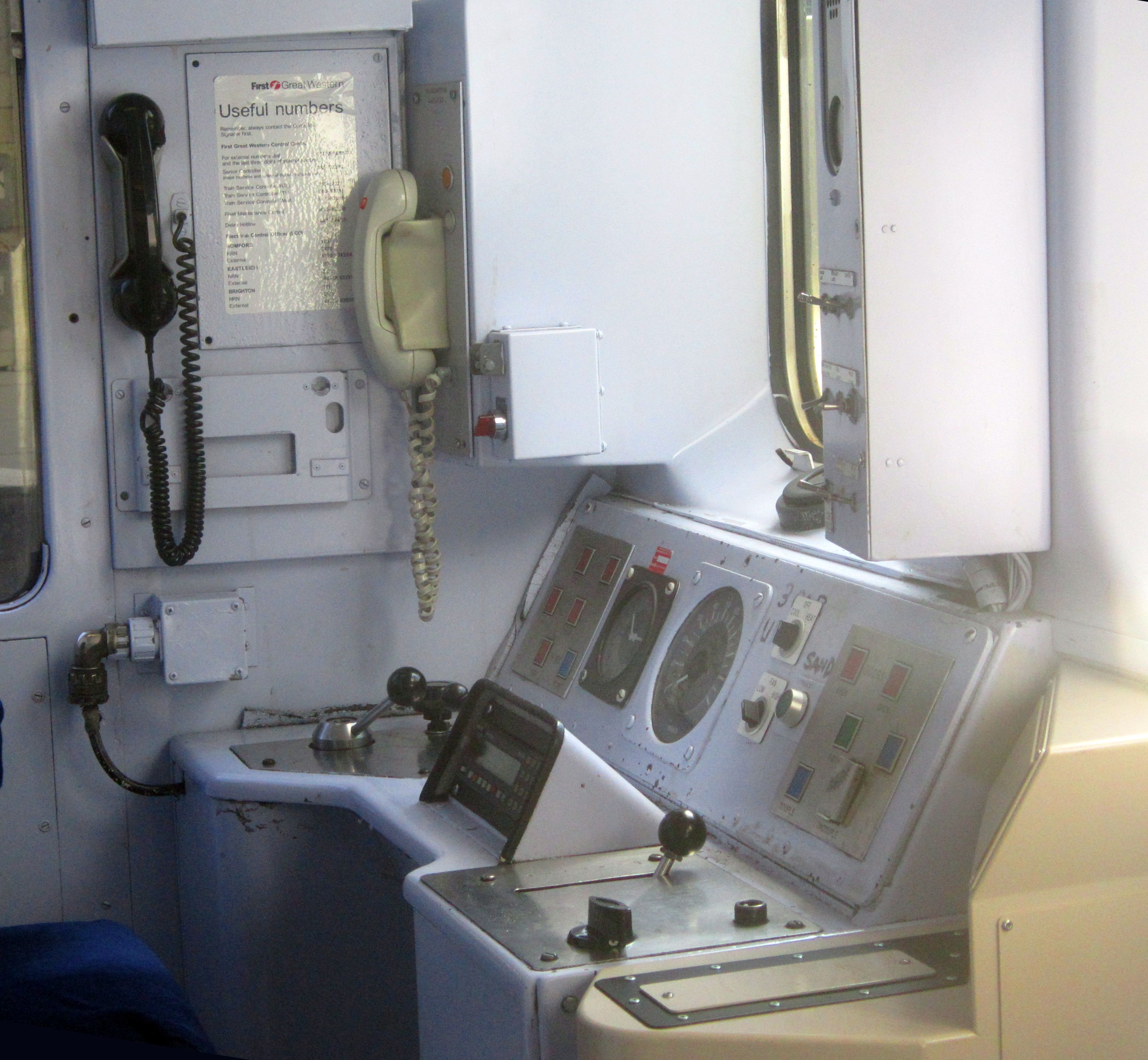
150/0 and /1 driving cab

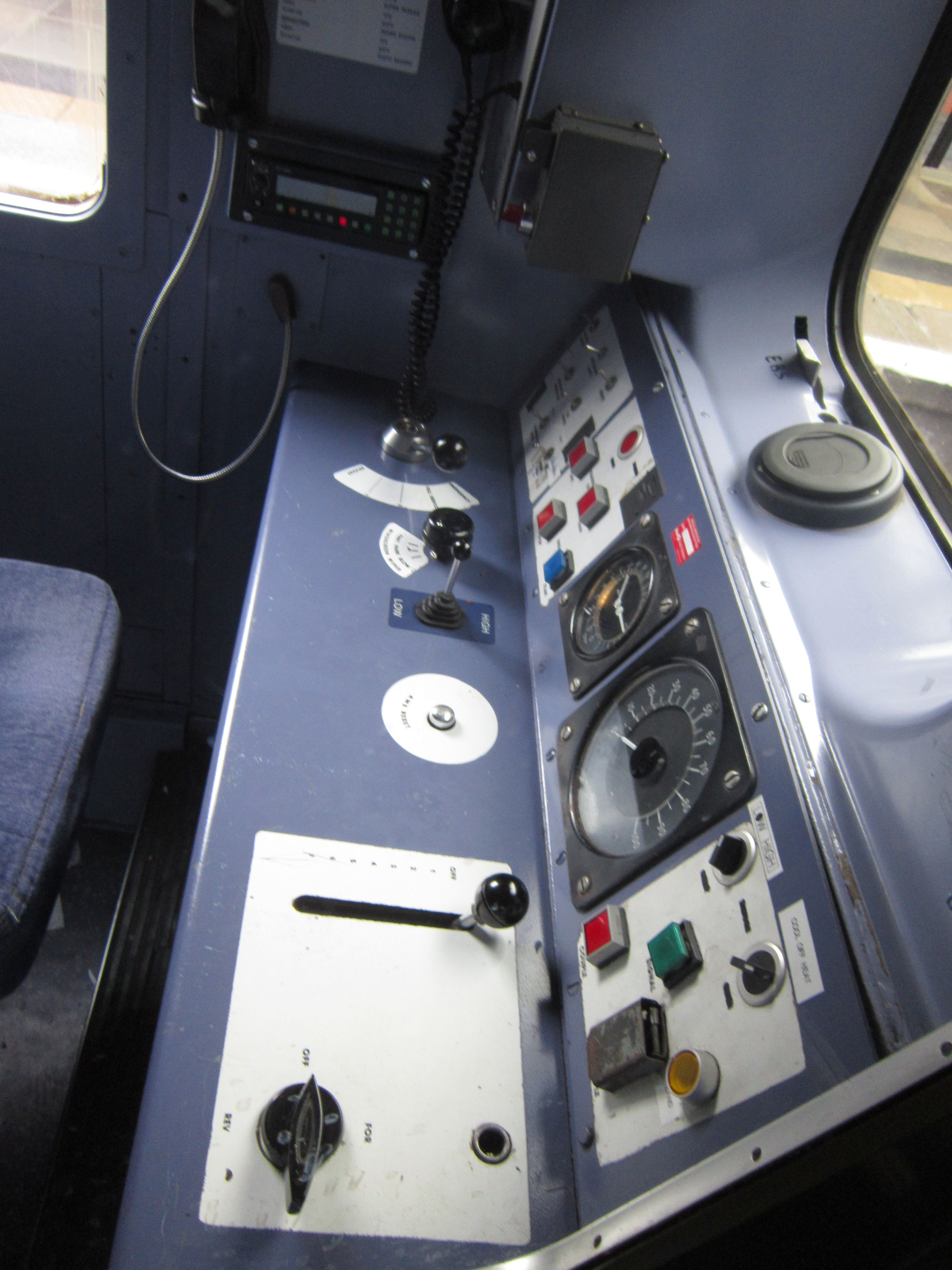
150/2 driving cab

The driving cab layout varies substantially between the subclasses.

This second batch of fifty units was classified as Class 150/1 and numbered in the range 150101-150. Like the prototype units, they did not have the front-end gangway connections which allowed passengers to move between two units that were working in multiple. Originally based at Derby Etches Park depot, these units were introduced in 1985, mainly concentrated around Birmingham and Manchester and, in later years, restricted mainly to commuter services.

The final batch of 85 two-car units was built with front-end gangway connections. These units were introduced in 1987, classified as Class 150/2 and numbered in the range 150201-285; they were used on longer-distance services.

Some of the Class 150/2 units were later disbanded and the vehicles were used to make some of the Birmingham and Manchester-based Class 150/1 units into three-car sets. The units in Manchester were later returned to their original configuration, but the Birmingham-based units were renumbered into the 1500xx range by subtracting 100 from the previous number (e.g. 150103 became 150003). This also gave the operational advantage of there being an extra set of passenger door controls within the train for use by the conductor, making it easier to collect revenue without having to run the full length of the unit between stations.

The Class 150 units have BSI couplers which enable them to work in multiple with Class 142, 143, 144, 153, 155, 156, 158 and 170 units, as well as with units of the same class. However, they cannot work in multiple with Class 165 or 166 units due to incompatible wiring arrangements.

When introduced, the Class 150s had unique interior door open/close buttons. In the north of England, they were square and blue; in the south of Scotland, they were yellow in colour and lit up turquoise when enabled; the button lit up bright yellow in the south of England. The illumination feature was intended to aid visually impaired people, although they did not meet the subsequent standards set out by disability regulations that were later introduced, because they had no raised braille and were too small for some disabled people to reasonably locate. During the 2000s, these blue buttons were replaced across the fleet by the standard EAO series 56 'easy to see, easy to press' raised circular door button, with braille writing for the visually impaired, over a yellow surround to comply with the Rail Vehicle Accessibility Regulations.

The 450 Class was built using the Class 150 bodyshell and was operated by Northern Ireland Railways. It came to the end of its design life in 2014, so most of them were scrapped, although two remained.

One further unit was built specifically for testing duties. Originally numbered in the Class 180 series, the unit is now in the departmental Class 950 series, numbered 950001 and carries the yellow Network Rail livery.

The performance of the Class 150 was such that BR decided to procure similar trains for the Provincial fleet, such as the Class 156 and Class 158 for longer regional routes, replacing a significant portion of the locomotive-hauled stock previously operated by BR.

== Current operations ==
=== Northern England ===
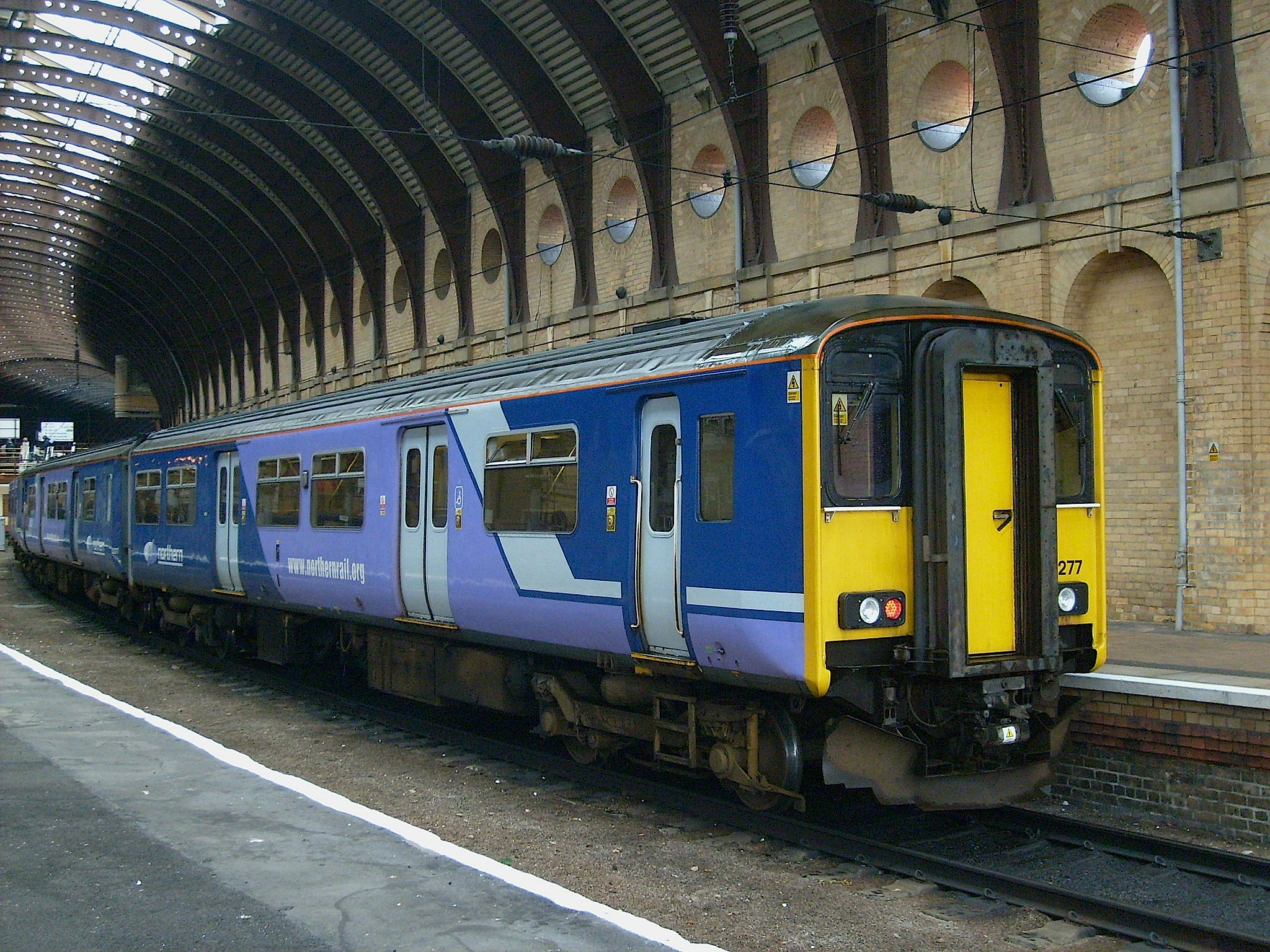
Northern Rail refurbished Class 150/2 Sprinter at York in 2007

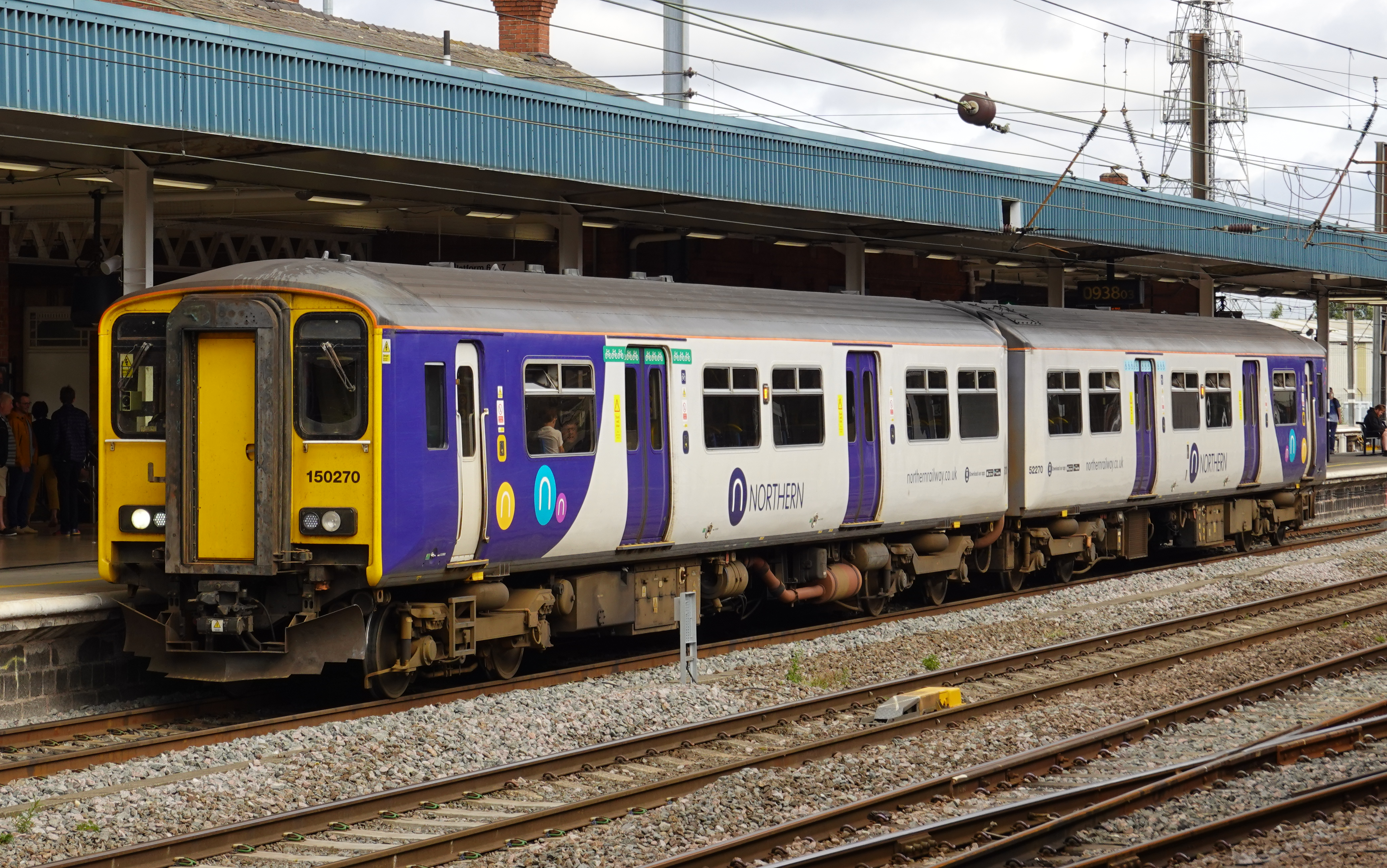
Northern Trains Class 150/2 at Doncaster in 2021

After privatisation, North Western Trains (which was later taken over by First Group and rebranded First North Western shortly afterwards) and Arriva Trains Northern operated Class 150/1 and 150/2s on their routes. The North Western Trains units underwent refurbishment by Hunslet-Barclay in Kilmarnock. The Arriva Trains Northern trains did not. When Northern Rail took over, both the former FNW and ATN Class 150s were transferred to Newton Heath depot, Manchester, with the former North Western Trains Class 158s taking the 150s' places at Northern's Neville Hill depot (Leeds). All Northern 150s contain high-density 2+3 seating. During late 2011, Northern Rail received various ex-London Midland 150/1s and 150/2s when the brand-new Class 172 units entered service in the Midlands. This enabled Northern Rail to increase capacity on its most overcrowded services.

In 2015, the then-new Northern franchise (Northern) announced that 24 of their Class 150 units would be reformed into three-car units by March 2019. The three-car sets were to be used on routes including the Penistone Line and Leeds to Goole, though this did not end up happening. The current operator, Northern Trains received the Angel Trains 150/0s, previously leased to GWR, on 1 April 2020.

It is expected that the units will continue in service with Northern until the early 2030s when they will be retired and replaced with the Class 780.

=== South-West England ===
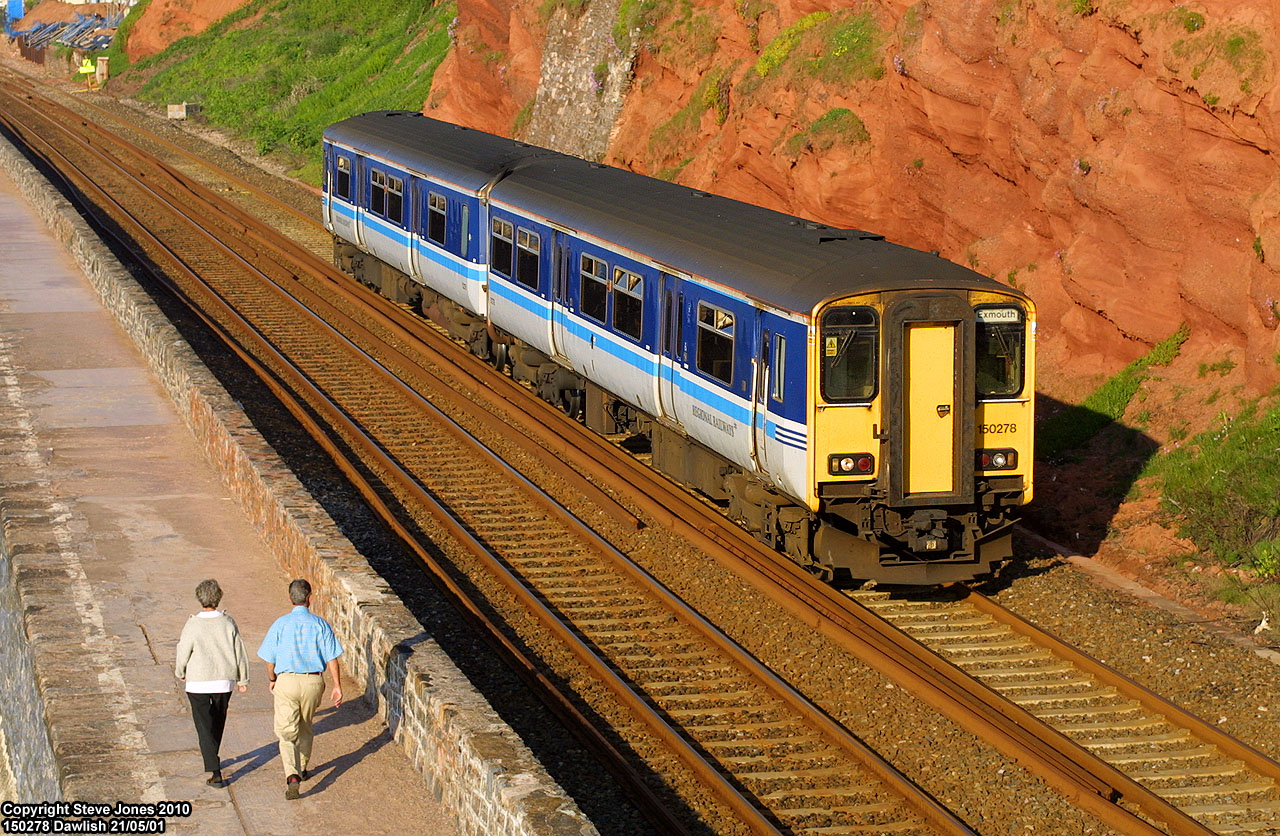
Regional railways liveried Class 150 near Dawlish in 2001

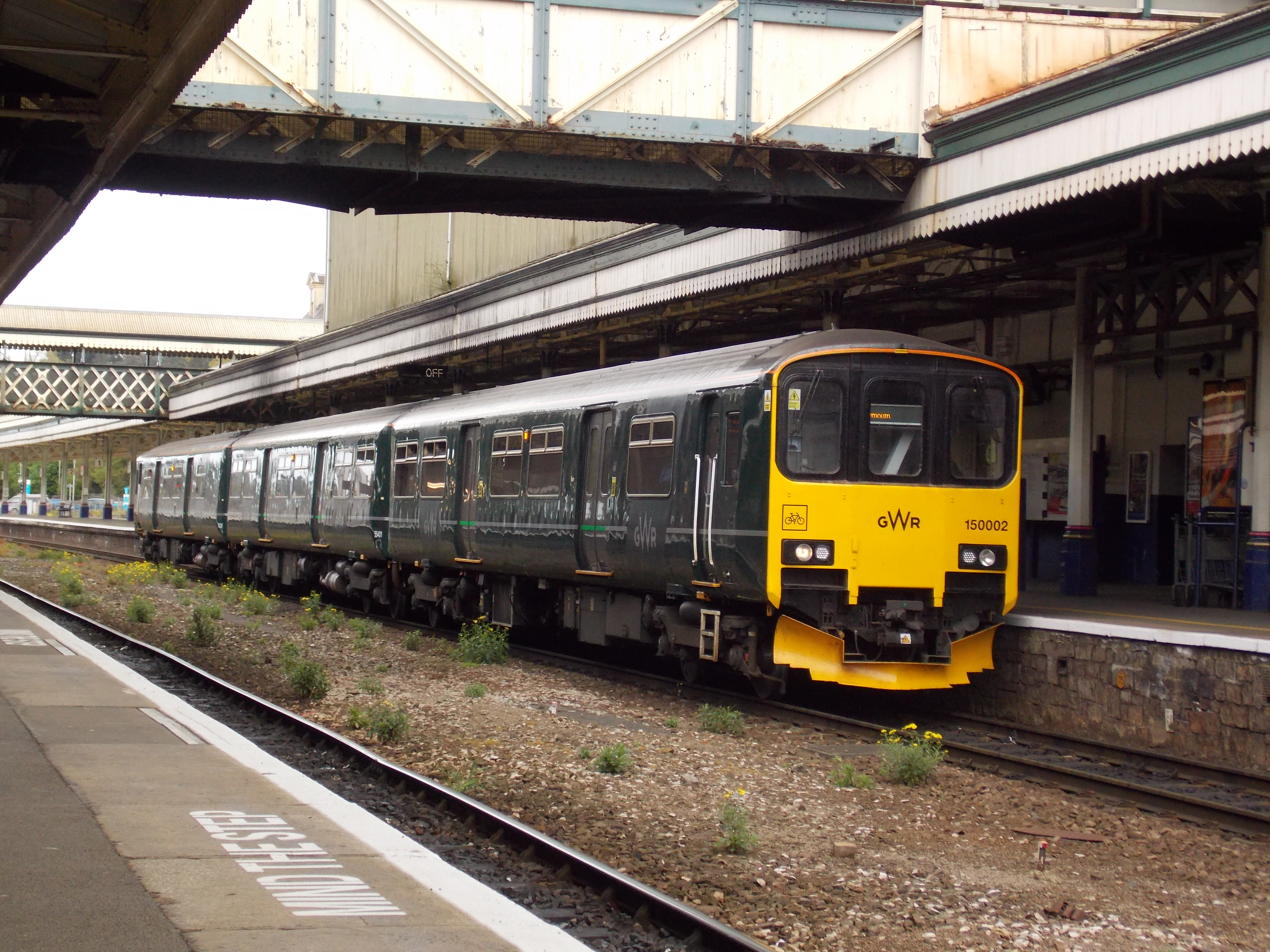
A Great Western Railway Class 150/0 Sprinter at Exeter St Davids in 2017

After British Rail was privatised, the fleet passed to Porterbrook which leased the trains to Wales & West; this train operating company was later split up into Wessex Trains and Wales & Borders (later Arriva Trains Wales) in 2001.

Great Western Railway currently operates a fleet of 20 Class 150/2 units, which are mainly used for services on the local branch lines in Devon. This includes the Avocet Line/Riviera Line between Exmouth and Paignton, plus the Tarka Line between Barnstaple and Exeter Central (occasionally, when a Class 158, 165 or 166 isn't available). They are also used on the Cornish branch lines which includes the Tamar Valley Line between Plymouth and Gunnislake, Atlantic Coast Line between Par and Newquay, Looe Valley Line between Liskeard and Looe, Maritime Line between Truro and Falmouth Docks and St Ives Bay Line between St Erth and St Ives.

GWR previously operated the two prototype three-car Class 150/0 units, which had transferred from London Midland and replaced the Class 165 and 166 Turbo units which were being used on the Reading to Basingstoke Line, which allowed the Turbo units to reinforce Thames Valley services. 150001 had entered service in January 2012. The two prototype units later cascaded down to the West fleet in response to the Class 387s taking over from the Class 165s and 166s on the London Paddington to Didcot Parkway services, hence releasing Turbos to take over on the Reading to Basingstoke Line again. Until the end of their operation by GWR, the two 150/0s were based at St Phillips Marsh depot in Bristol and were used on local services around Bristol and Exeter. In April 2020, they transferred to Northern Trains.

=== Wales ===
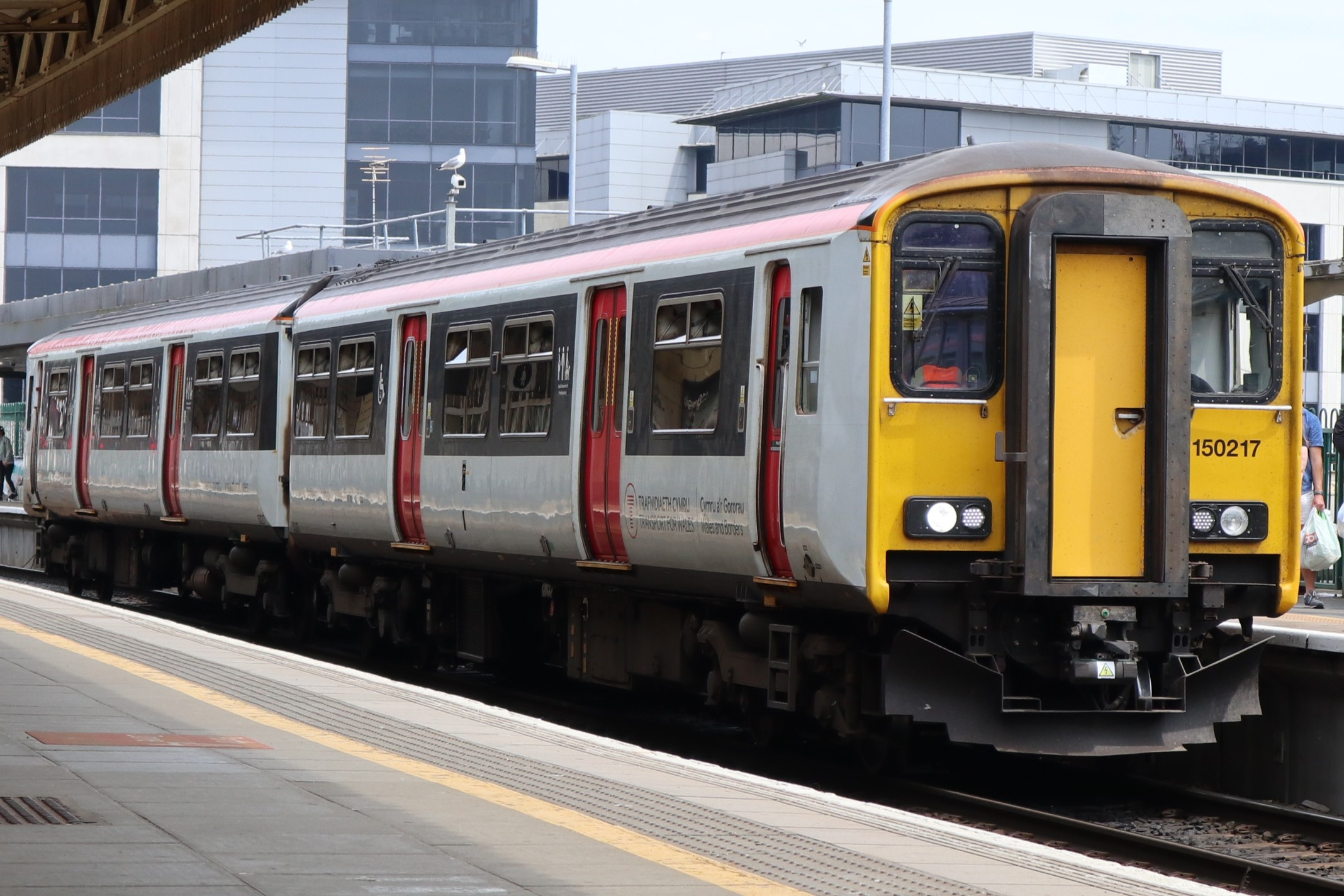
A Transport For Wales Class 150 Sprinter at Cardiff Central in 2023

Following privatisation, Wales & Borders continued to use the fleet of Class 150 units on branch-line services as well as on the commuter services around Cardiff known as the Valley Lines and the Vale of Glamorgan Line. The units transferred to Arriva Trains Wales in December 2003, with more later acquired for the reopened Ebbw Vale line. All of the ATW units were transferred to KeolisAmey Wales on 14 October 2018 and all KeolisAmey Wales units were transferred to Transport for Wales on 7 February 2021.

=== Midlands ===
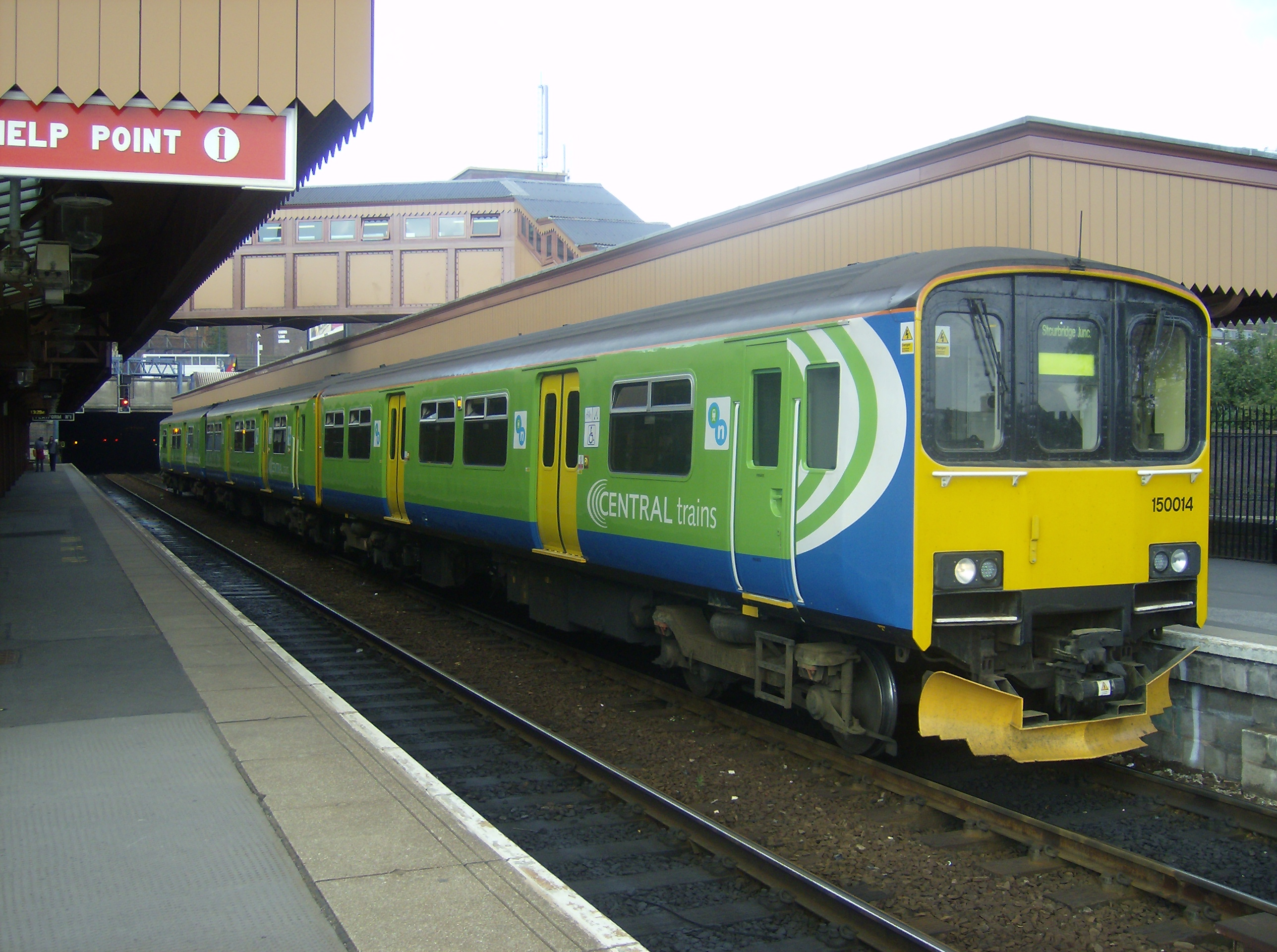
Central Trains/Centro refurbished Class 150/0 Sprinter at Birmingham Moor Street in 2007

Following privatisation of British Rail, both Silverlink and Central Trains operated Class 150s in the Midland regions of England and both companies were run by National Express.

In 2010, London Midland ordered Class 172 replacements for its Class 150s. It initially hoped to retain some of the 150s as additional capacity, although they were also wanted by First Great Western and Northern Rail. London Midland was expected to lose all of its Class 150s, but a change in plan saw it retain three Class 150 units as additional capacity, following a statement from the Department for Transport on 10 August 2011. However, London Midland lost two Class 153s to First Great Western as a result.

On 29 April 2019, the Class 150s that were still in operation with West Midlands Trains transferred to Arriva Rail North, having been replaced by Class 230s and Class 172s.

In July 2023, three Class 150/1s (150137, 150139 and 150141) were leased from Northern Trains to London Northwestern Railway for use on the Marston Vale line, after the Class 230s in use on the line were withdrawn from use in December 2022, due to maintenance concerns after the company that maintained the units, Vivarail, went into administration. The Class 150s entered service with London Northwestern Railway on 20 November 2023.

== Former operations ==
=== Scotland ===
Upon the privatisation of British Rail, the bus company National Express ran ScotRail, and its successor First ScotRail operated 18 Class 150s out of Edinburgh Waverley on Fife Circle services. Other workings included Dundee and Carnoustie, as well as operating alongside other DMUs such as Class 158s on the services between Newcraighall through Edinburgh to Bathgate, Stirling, Dunblane and occasionally Perth. In 2005, 15 were transferred to Arriva Trains Wales and three to Northern Rail.

=== Eastern England ===
Anglia Railways was created upon privatisation of British Rail and it initially inherited a small fleet of nine Class 150/2 units, later supplemented with a tenth. The units were based at Crown Point TMD, and put to use on rural services in Suffolk and Norfolk. Lines using the units included the Bittern Line, the East Suffolk Line and the Wherry Lines, as well as services from Ipswich to Cambridge. One unit each weekday was sub-leased to First Great Eastern for use on the Sudbury Branch Line. Anglia Railways named all bar one unit (150245) of its fleet after famous local figures. On 1 April 2004, Anglia Railways became part of the new One franchise. The Class 150 units were transferred to Arriva Trains Wales (no. 150245) and Central Trains (all other units), having been replaced by Class 156 units from Central Trains.

=== Silverlink/London Overground ===
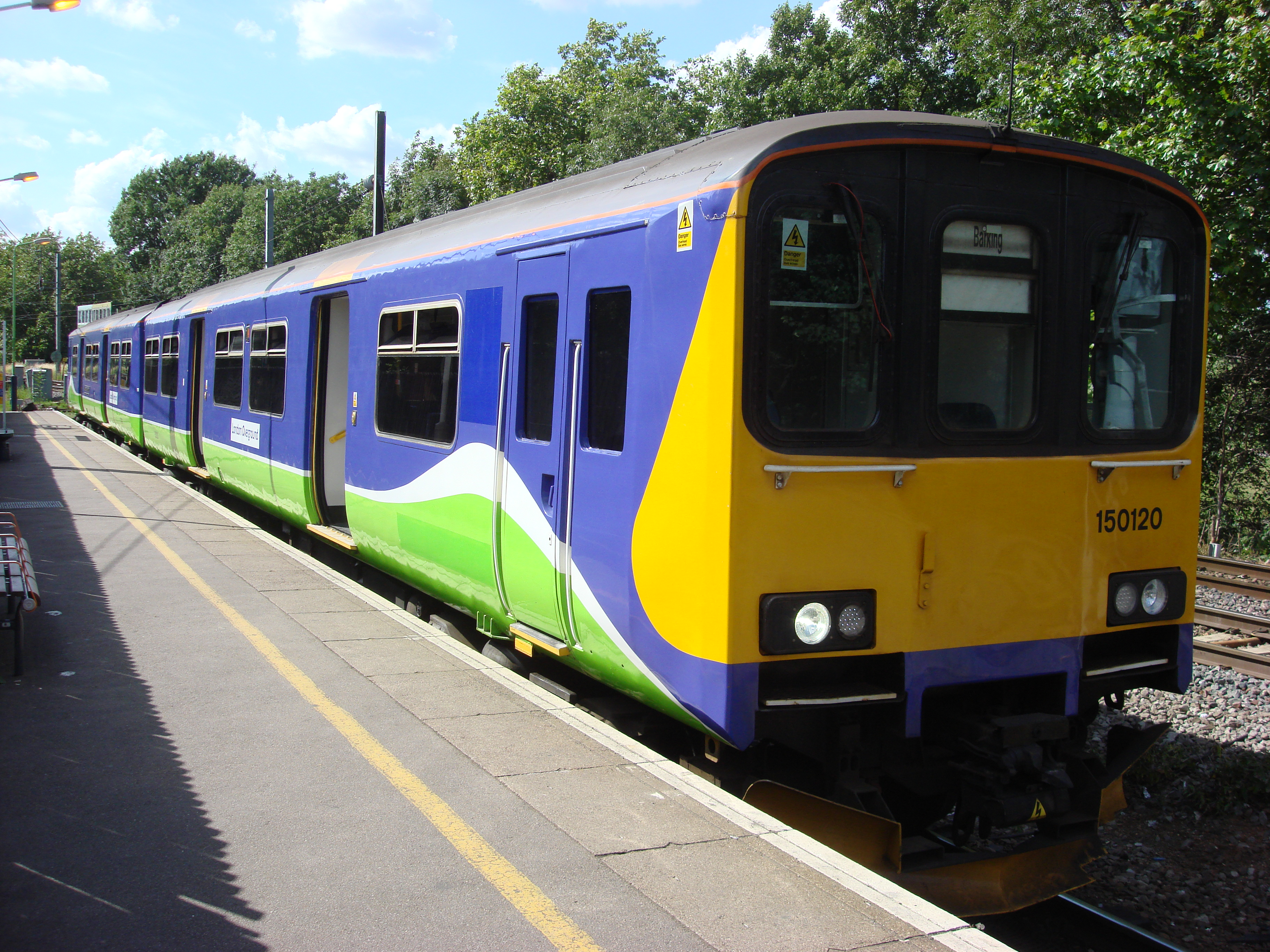
Silverlink liveried, London Overground operated Class 150/1 Sprinter at Gospel Oak in 2008

National Express operated the North London Railways franchise from 1997 under the Silverlink brand. They had eight Class 150s: seven were cascaded from Central Trains following delivery of new Turbostar units in 2000, to replace the ageing fleet of Class 117 and Class 121 units; the other, no. 150121, was transferred to Silverlink in late 2005.

London Overground Rail Operations, which took over the North London network in 2007, inherited the eight Class 150/1 units. Six were employed on the Gospel Oak to Barking line, while two were sent on long-term loan to First Great Western.

All units had names. The majority of the names are references to the Marston Vale Line on which they operated during Silverlink's franchise: Leslie Crabbe was a long-standing railway employee, who worked on the route; Richard Crane is the chairman of the Bletchley to Bedford Rail Users Association who has campaigned for the line to be retained and expanded.

By the end of October 2010, all London Overground's Class 150/1s had been replaced by a new fleet of eight two-car Class 172 units operating exclusively on the Gospel Oak to Barking Line. Their final use was on 28 October 2010, when unit 150128 formed the 19:02 Barking to Gospel Oak service. The six units were cascaded to First Great Western, together with nine of the London Midland fleet.

== Preservation ==
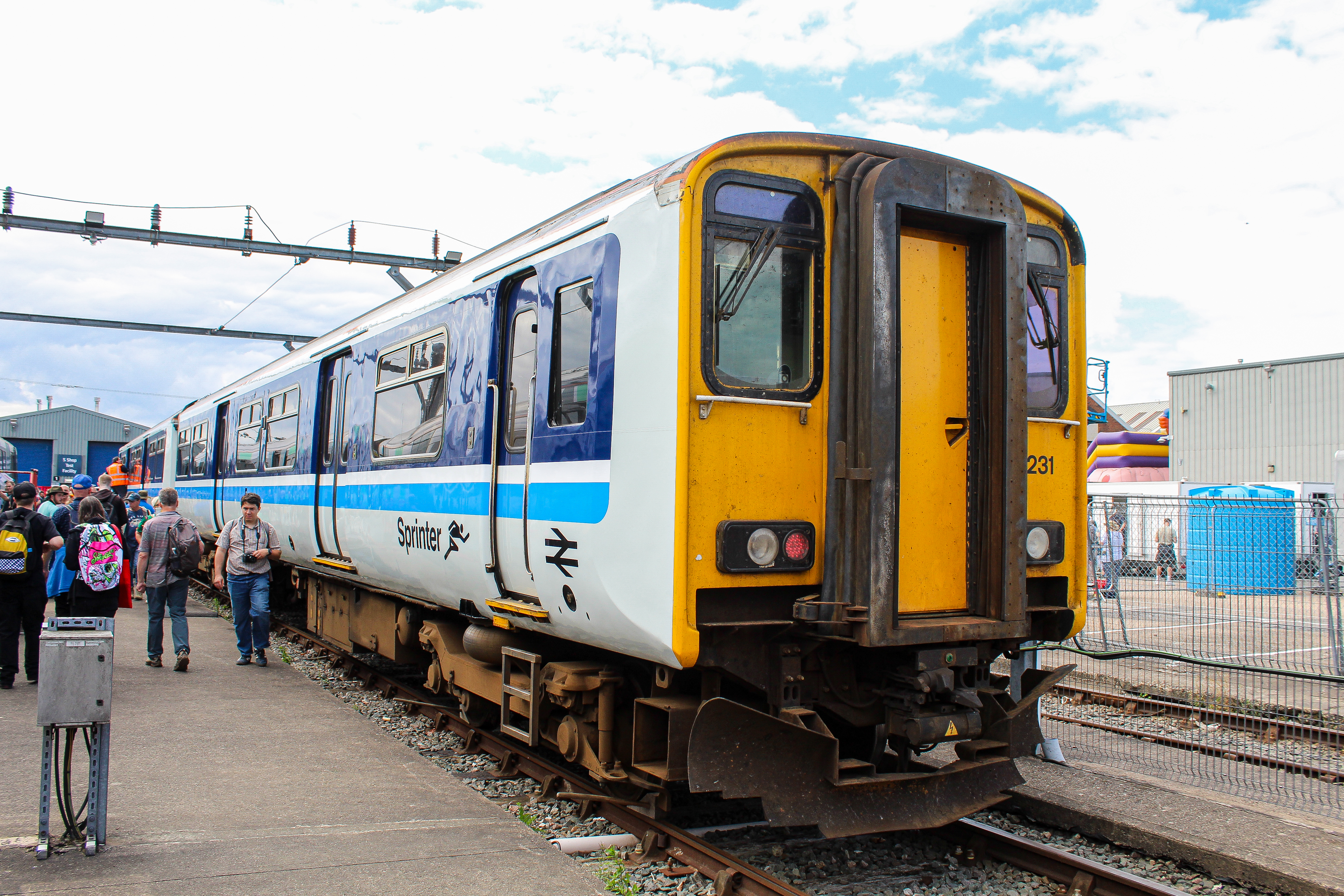
Regional Railways preserved 150231 at The Greatest Gathering, Derby in 2025

On 31 July 2025, the Watercress Line, a heritage railway in Hampshire announced that it had been donated 150231 from Porterbrook, joining its fleet of heritage railway rolling stock.

== Fleet details ==
Unit details
Class	Operator	Number	Cars	Year(s) built	Unit numbers/notes
150/0	Northern Trains	2	3	1984	150001–150002 (both these early units originally prototypes and the only two "real" 3-car 150s)
150/0	Northern Trains	6	3	1985–1987	150003–150008 (each unit formed by inserting a Class 150/2 vehicle between the driving vehicles of a former Class 150/1 unit). (Note: 150003 formed of vehicles 52116+57209+57116, 150004 formed of vehicles 52112+57212+57112, 150005 formed of vehicles 52117+52223+57117, 150006 formed of vehicles 52147+57223+57147, 150007 formed of vehicles 52132+52226+57132, and 150008 formed of vehicles 52111+57226+57111. For the number of the unit a vehicle is originally from, replace "52" or "57" with "150".)
150/1	Northern Trains	41	2	1985–1986	150101–150110, 150113–150115, 150118–150131, 150133–150136, 150138, 150140, 150142–150146, 150148–150150
150/1	West Midlands Trains	3	2	1985–1986	150137, 150139, 150141
150/2	Northern Trains	25	2	1986–1987	150201, 150203–150206, 150210–150211, 150214–150215, 150218, 150220, 150222, 150224–150225, 150228, 150268–150277
150/2	Great Western Railway	20	2	1986–1987	150202, 150207, 150216, 150219, 150221, 150232–150234, 150238–150239, 150243–150244, 150246–150249, 150261, 150263, 150265–150266
150/2	Transport for Wales	20	2	1986–1987	150208, 150241–150242, 150245, 150251–252, 150254, 150258–150260, 150262, 150264, 150267, 150278–150280, 150282–150285
150/2	Preserved	1	2	1986–1987	150231
150/2	Stored	4	2	1986–1987	150213, 150217, 150256–150257
150/2	Scrapped	12 (equiv.)	2	1986–1987	150227, 150229, 150230, 150235–150237, 150240, 150250, 150253 150255, 150281, Vehicles 52209 and 52212, from units 150209 and 150212 respectively, were scrapped after being damaged in accidents (see § Accidents and incidents). (Note: The undamaged matching vehicles, 57209 and 57212, were first formed into a 'replacement' unit 150209, then separated and inserted into First Great Western units 150925 and 150926 respectively in 2012, then removed and in 2021 inserted into units 150116 and 150112 to form 'new' three-car units 150003 and 150004 for Northern Trains.)

== Named units ==
The following Class 150 units are currently or were previously named:

- 150120 Gospel Oak-Barking 2000 (denamed)
- 150121 Silver Service (formerly Willesden Eight) (denamed)
- 150122 RSC Express (denamed)
- 150123 Bletchley Seven (formerly Richard Crane and Willesden TMD) (denamed)
- 150125 The Heart of Wessex Line
- 150128 Bedford-Bamberg 30 (denamed)
- 150129 Devon & Cornwall Rail Partnership (formerly Marston Vale)
- 150130 Sevenside Community Rail Partnership
- 150131 Leslie Crabbe (denamed)
- 150133 Northern Star (denamed)
- 150137 Brickfield Breeze
- 150139 Bedford Belle
- 150141 Bletchley Codebreakers
- 150213 Lord Nelson
- 150214 The Bentham Line – A Dementia-Friendly Railway
- 150217 Oliver Cromwell
- 150227 Sir Alf Ramsey
- 150229 George Borrow
- 150230 The Tamar Kingfisher (denamed)
- 150231 King Edmund
- 150232 The Costal Connection (denamed)
- 150233 Peter West OBE (formerly Lady Margaret of Looe Valley) (denamed)
- 150234 The National Trust (denamed)
- 150235 Cardinal Wolsey
- 150237 Hereward The Wake
- 150238 Exeter Explorer (denamed)
- 150241 The Tarka Belle (denamed)
- 150243 The Filton Partnership (denamed)
- 150244 The West Cornwall Experience (denamed)
- 150248 The Great Gardens of Cornwall (denamed)
- 150249 J Charles Lang (denamed)
- 150253 The Exmouth Avocet (denamed)
- 150255 Henry Blogg
- 150257 Queen Boadicea
- 150261 The Tarka Line The First 25 Years 1989-2014 (formerly The Riviera Flyer)
- 150263 The Castles of Cornwall (denamed)
- 150265 The Falmouth Flyer (denamed)
- 150266 The Whitley Wonder (denamed)
- 150268 Benny Rothman-The Manchester Rambler (denamed)
- 150273 Driver John Axon GC (denamed)
- 150275 The Yorkshire Regiment – Yorkshire Warrior (denamed)
- 150280 University of Glamorgan (denamed)
- 150285 Edinburgh Bathgate 1986-1996

== Accidents and incidents ==
- On 15 December 1987, 150212 collided with an engineer's crane near Seamer West signal box in North Yorkshire. Carriage 52212 scrapped, 57212 joined with 57209 to form 150209.
- On 11 November 1988, 150209 derailed at St Helens Central, Merseyside. The train struck the abutment of an overbridge, crushing the leading cab and killing the driver. Sixteen passengers sustained minor injuries. Carriage 52209 was scrapped, while 57209 was joined with 57212.
- On 12 July 2012, 150217 collided with cattle at Letterston, Pembrokeshire, and was derailed. There were no injuries amongst the 30 passengers and crew on the train.
- On 11 May 2014, 150239 collided with a motorcycle on a level crossing at Frampton Mansell, Gloucestershire, killing the rider.
- On 14 May 2015, two Class 150 units formed a train that collided with an agricultural tractor on an occupation crossing between Knaresborough and Cattal, North Yorkshire. Three people were injured.
- On 7 November 2015, units 150133 and 150204 formed a passenger train that was derailed near Knaresborough due to a signalman's error.
- On 3 April 2016, 150219 collided with a stationary InterCity 125 train at Plymouth. Thirty-five people were injured, and both trains were damaged.
- On 3 September 2017, 150217 collided with a tree near Llanbradach in Caerphilly, Wales, at around 10 pm. Three people were injured and five fire crews were in attendance.
- On 7 February 2018, 150203 divided on the approach to Leeds. There were no injuries, but passengers had to be evacuated across the tracks.
- On 31 January 2019, 150234 derailed at low speed at Penryn shortly before 1 pm. No injuries were reported. A reduced service was run on the line between Truro and Falmouth until the unit was removed.
- On 15 October 2019, 150245 collided with a fallen tree near Spittal, Pembrokeshire and was severely damaged.
- On 27 August 2021, 150271 collided with the outrigger of a crane lorry that was obstructing the line at Penistone.
- On 26 November 2021, 150284 collided with a fallen tree and was derailed at Balderton, Cheshire.
- On 22 May 2022, a train formed of 150240, 150242 and 150279 struck a mini digger near Craven Arms, causing a fuel leak, igniting a fire under one of the carriages. Two units were severely damaged.
