= Integrated Electronic Control Centre =

British railway signalling technology

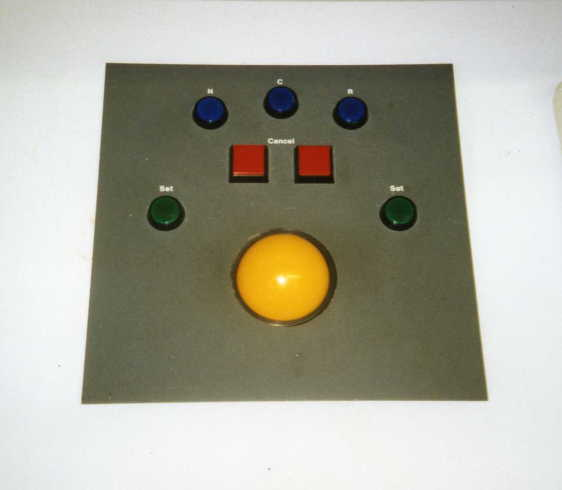
IECC trackerball and associated buttons used for route setting

The Integrated Electronic Control Centre (IECC) was developed in the late 1980s by the British Rail Research Division for UK-based railway signalling centres, although variations exist around the world. It is the most widely deployed VDU based signalling control system in the UK, with over 50 workstations in control centres that manage many of the most complex and busy areas of the network.

IECC consists of a number of operator’s workstations with VDU/LCD displays which depict the control area and is semi-automatic using Automatic Route Setting (ARS) – a computer-based route setting system driven from a pre-programmed timetable database. ARS can also handle severely disrupted service patterns and assist the signaller in the event of train or infrastructure failures.

IECCs were developed as an alternative to the traditional switch or button panel control, which in turn replaced mechanical lever frames. From the start, they controlled Solid State Interlockings (SSIs), a software version of the traditional relay interlocking, but existing relay interlockings may also be controlled from an IECC. The system can control as many miles of track as required, but typically around 50–100 miles.

Recently, PC-based control systems, similar to the IECC have been developed and are sold by various signalling contractors, e.g. Westinghouse Rail Systems WESTCAD.

== History ==
=== Background and development ===
By the start of the 1980s, the then-incumbent approach to railway signalling, known as the power signal box, made extensive use of electromechanically-operated relays; in addition to requiring sizable equipment rooms and frequent servicing, these relays were relatively labour-intensive to produce and expensive to maintain, were anticipated to rise in both cost and difficulty to procure as the wider electronics industry was in the process of transitioning to solid state electronics. By the late 1970s, it was becoming apparent that a software processor-based system could have the potential to succeed relay based interlockings.

Accordingly, a team at British Rail Research Division begun in-depth work into the prospective replacement of BR's existing electromechanical relay-based interlocks by electronic means, this was known as Solid State Interlocking (SSI). The benefits of such an approach included greater levels of both reliability and speed while also reducing space and wiring requirements. During 1985, BR commissioned the first SSI for trial operation at Leamington Spa. It quickly proved to be successful, and became an approved standard for BR; furthermore, SSI proved to be a commercial success on the international export market, being widely deployed abroad across various railways around the world.

Another key technology developed by BR's Research Division around this time was Automatic Route Setting (ARS), which is an algorithm-based system that compares timetabled train movements (held on a database) with real-time operations across the railway, and automatically setting routes to suit. With the correct application of appropriately set rules, ARS can prioritise and handle various forms of service disruption, including late-running trains. The stated aims of ARS was to reduce the workload of the signaller and to expand the possible area of control; following operational deployment, a noticeable reduction in workflow were typically achieved. In 1983, a prototype ARS started being used in revenue service at Three Bridges signalling control centre.

Seeking to build on these advances, BR's Research Division decided to use SSI as the basis of a computerised replacement for the power signal box - this innovation was known as the Integrated Electronic Control Centre (IECC). The IECC's control system was centred around a computer, which served as the interface between the signaller and the interlocking. Route setting, either by the signaller or ARS, were directly transmitted to the interlocking to set the appropriate route for a train at the correct time interval. The basic IECC system comprised three workstations and 12 interlockings; for expanded capacity at busy areas, multiple IECC implementations could be installed at the same location. Prior to the introduction of IECC, neither visual display unit-based interfaces or ARS had been used, and thus were a major shift in the both layout and working arrangements within signalling control centres.

During the 1980s, BR staff at the Railway Technical Centre in Derby worked on the IECC concept. In January 1987, a contract for the development of an operational standard system to CAP Group, which included the supply of a complete system for Yoker (Glasgow) and the ARS for the Waterloo area. This was the first time that a software house had become involved in railway signalling after competing against the main incumbent suppliers of GEC-General Signal and Westinghouse Signals Ltd. The resulting solution incorporated off-the-shelf microcomputer technology (Motorola 68000 microprocessors and VME Bus) alongside a BR-created real-time operating system; these hosted the sub-systems of IECC in high availability configurations linked via a duplicated Nine Tiles Superlink local area network. Subsequent contracts were let to CAP Group (which became Sema Group in 1988) for further operational IECC systems involving the supply of turnkey hardware and software.

=== Early deployment ===
During 1989, the first IECC was commissioned at Liverpool Street; it was quickly followed by York. Early intentions had been for a pilot scheme to be ran at Yoker for the new technology, however, a separate signalling renewal scheme at Liverpool proved to be opportunely timed. By the start of 1999, all three IECC-equipped centres were operational. These early deployments of IECC were largely positive, promptly proving to be relatively versatile in traffic management in spite of adverse conditions, such as initial SSI unreliability due to high levels of electromagnetic interference present at some locations.

Between 1990 and 1994, a further seven new IECC-equipped centres were commissioned along with a partial system that was retrofitted at the existing Wimbledon signalling control centre to provide automatic route-setting while retaining a traditional control/indication panel. While no new centres were opened between 1995 and 2003, numerous IECCs were expanded to take on more of the workload; by the mid-2000s, Liverpool Street had grown from one to four IECC systems, permitting an increase in its area of control up to a largo portion of the railways across East Anglia.

As a consequence of the privatisation of British Rail during the mid-1990s, British Rail's Research Division was acquired by AEA Technology Rail, who took over as the primary supplier for new IECCs, support for the existing installed base, and enhancements to the hardware and software. While the original system's architecture has proven to be fit for purpose in the long term, due to the rapid advance of computer technology, the hardware has been subject to frequent changes and improvements as many of the original components has become obsolete and no longer obtainable. The privately-owned rail infrastructure company Railtrack made regular investments into upgrading the software (alongside accompanying documentation and safety approvals) for the IECCs. Unlike most traditional signalling control systems, periodic upgrades of IECC were performed to enhance functionality. One such ease of use change was the transition from EPROMs to CD-ROM as the means of configuring IECC subsystems.

=== Further developments ===
Several changes and refinements have been made since the introduction of first the IECC. Early on, inexperienced staff could negatively impact operational performance by incorrectly preparing data; thus working practices were changed so that only dedicated personnel would perform data preparation. In response to a recommendation made in the aftermath of the Ladbroke Grove rail crash, a SPAD monitor subsystem was rolled out to every IECC.

In 2006, the AEA rail business became DeltaRail (now called Resonate Group), who have developed IECC Scalable which replicates all the functionality of the original IECC on a modern hardware platform and software architecture. Following a successful six-month trial at Swindon B in 2012, IECC Scalable is now the standard for new installations, starting with Cambridge where it controls the Ely-Norwich line which has been resignalled on the "modular signalling" concept for secondary routes. In September 2020, the original Liverpool Street IECC was replaced with a new IECC Scalable system.

== List of IECCs in service as of 9 January 2024 ==
Location	IECCs	Workstations	Area controlled	ARS?
Ashford	2	5	Southern Region SE section and High Speed 1	Yes
Cambridge	1 scalable	1	Ely to Norwich (exclusive of junctions at either end)	No
Edinburgh	5 (all scalable)	9	East Coast Main Line, from north of Berwick-upon-Tweed to south of Cupar and Fife Circle Line; also routes towards Glasgow via Falkirk, Bathgate, Shotts and Carstairs.	Yes
Harrogate	1 (Scalable)	1	Harrogate to Leeds (exclusive)	No
Liverpool Street SDC (Service Delivery Centre)	5 (all Scalable)	10	Great Eastern Main Line to Marks Tey, Bishop's Stortford/Stansted North Junction/Stansted Airport and branches	Yes
Marylebone	1 (Scalable)	2	Chiltern lines to Aynho Junction near Banbury	Yes
Thames Valley Signalling Centre	10 (all Scalable)	14 signalling 1 CCTV crossing keeper	Great Western main line from London Paddington to Bristol Parkway and Temple Meads, Swindon and branches, plus Didcot to Oxford, and Reading to Westbury (exclusive).	Yes
Upminster	3 (all Scalable)	5	London, Tilbury and Southend line and North London line	Yes
York ROC	3 (all Scalable)	7	East Coast Main Line, from north of Doncaster to north of Northallerton and Leeds area	Yes

The following installations are not true IECCs of the BR/SEMA/DeltaRail design. They are VDU based signalling control systems with a similar "look and feel" but in most cases they do not incorporate Automatic Route Setting.
Some locations shown below are interim installations which will eventually move into larger signalling control centres, such as Leamington and Madeley, which in time will move to the West Midlands Signalling Centre.

Location	Workstations	Area controlled	ARS?	Equipment
Bournemouth	1	Dorset coast	No	VICOS (Siemens SIMIS - W)
East Midlands Control Centre, Derby	5	Sharnbrook to Spondon, Attenborough to Trent East, Sheet Stores to Stenson Junction, Toton Yard, Erewash Valley Line, Pinxton Branch, Clay Cross to Tapton, Narborough - Leicester	Yes (Note: Nottingham, Trent & Burton Workstations now have Hitachi ICS TREsa (ARS+) commissioned.)	WestCAD
Leamington Spa	1	Banbury to Warwick	No	WestCAD
Madeley (Shropshire)	1	Oxley (exclusive) to Shrewsbury (exclusive) via Telford and Wellington	No	WestCAD
Marston Vale	2	Fenny Stratford (nr. Bletchley) to Bedford St. Johns	No	GE MCS
Former Rugby Power Signal Box	1	Formerly controlled Hunsbury Hill (exclusive) to Hillmorton Junction (exclusive) via Northampton. (The WestCAD controlled the original Solid State Interlocking.); Control transferred to Rugby SCC on 3 June 2012	No	WestCAD
Rugby ROC	3	Stafford Workstation: Penkridge / Milford & Brockton - Basford Hall (exclusive) Colwich Workstation: Polesworth (inclusive) - Shugborough Tunnel / Hixon Claydon Workstation: Bletchley - Gavray Junction	Yes (Stafford only)	WestCAD MCS Infinity (Claydon)
Rugby Signalling Control Centre	5	West Coast Main Line between Kings Langley (exclusive) and Polesworth (exclusive) also Three Spires Junction (exclusive) to Nuneaton, Arley Tunnel to Hinckley (exclusive) and Brandon to Rugby.	Yes	GE MCS
Wembley Mainline Suburban Workstation	1	South Hampstead to Watford Junction DC Lines	No (Note: These systems (WestCAD, Westinghouse Control and Display; GE MCS, General Electric Modular Control System) which are already in existence, are planned to be upgraded when the supplier's version of ARS has received Network Rail approval.)	WestCAD
Stoke-on-Trent	2	Hixon / Stone to Crewe/Macclesfield	No	GE MCS
Colchester PSB	6	Marks Tey - Manningtree, Colchester - Alresford, Alresford - Clacton/Walton-on-the-Naze, Westerfield - Felixstowe*, Brundall - Great Yarmouth/Buckenham*, Buckenham - Lowestoft + Oulton Broad South*.	Yes/No (Workstations marked with (*) do not have ARS)	GE MCS
West Midlands Signalling Centre	4	Jewellery Quarter to Warwick/Stratford-upon-Avon via Birmingham Snow Hill and Brandon/Milverton to Hampton-in-Arden/Three Spires Jn, Wolverhampton North Jn (excl.) to Bilbrook	No	WestCAD
West of Scotland ROC (WSROC)	7	Glasgow Central to Rutherglen, East Kilbride, Paisley Canal, Ayr, Largs, Wemyss Bay and Gourock	Yes	GE MCS
Port Talbot	1	Llanharan to Baglan	No	WestCAD
Abercynon	1	Abercynon to Merthyr Tydfil and Aberdare	No	WestCad; 1 x SSI Interlocking
Wales ROC (WROC)	10; 1 CCTV crossing keeper	Ebbw Workstation (Newport - Cardiff Long Dyke) ∞ Newport Workstation (Newport - East Usk) ∞ East Usk Workstation (East Usk - Severn Tunnel) ∞ Severn Tunnel Workstation (Severn Tunnel to Pilning and Awre) ∞ Cardiff VOG (Cardiff - Cowbridge Road and Leckwith - LLantrisant) ° Cardiff Valley (Cardiff Bay - Rhymney) ° Cardiff Main (Cardiff Long Dyke - Leckwith) ° Shrewsbury North (Shrewsbury - Gresty Lane) ∞ ¤ ៛ Port Talbot - Swansea ∞	No ∞ Yes ° ARF ៛	7 x WestCad ∞ 3 x GE MCS ° 15 x Westlock Int; Remote Westrace Int ¤
East London Line Signalling Control Centre	2	Highbury & Islington station to New Cross/New Cross Gate	ARF	WestCAD
Havant	3	Portsmouth Harbour to Fareham and Rowlands Castle	No	VICOS (Siemens SIMIS - W)
Saxmundham	1	Oulton Broad South - Westerfield.	No	GE MCS
Yoker (Note: As of 2/4/2017, Yoker IECC has been converted to GE MCS with Hitachi ICS TREsa)	2	Glasgow North suburban area	Yes	GE MCS
York ROC	19	Sheffield Rotherham North Lincolnshire Huddersfield Halifax Brough Hartlepool Middlesbrough Kings Cross Finsbury Park Wood Green Langley Hitchin Peterborough Huntingdon Huntingdon (Level Crossing) Hambleton York Station York North	Yes	WestCAD
