= British Rail railbuses =

Lightweight rail cars for low volume infrequent rail traffic

British Rail Railbuses
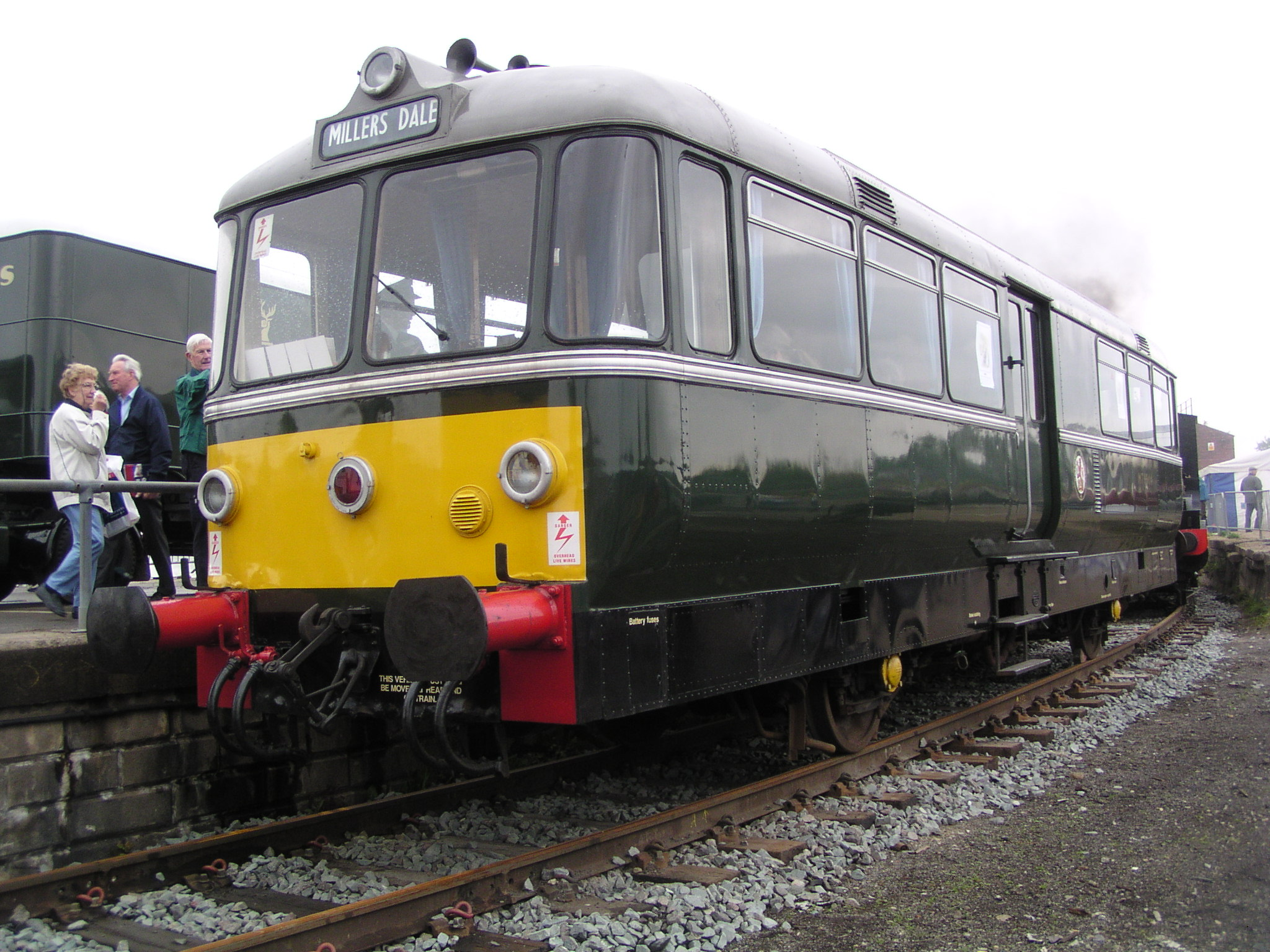
- Waggon- und Maschinenbau railbus no. 79964 at York Railfest exhibition in 2004. This vehicle is preserved on the Keighley and Worth Valley Railway.
- In service: Passenger: 1958–1968; Departmental: 1950–1997
- Capacity: 46–56 seats
- Operators: British Rail; NI Railways

British Rail produced a variety of railbuses, both as a means of acquiring new rolling stock cheaply, and to provide economical services on lightly used lines.

== Terminology ==
Railbuses are a very lightweight type of railcar designed specifically for passenger transport on little-used railway lines. As the name suggests, they share many aspects of their construction with a bus, usually having a bus body, or a modified bus body, and having four wheels on a fixed wheelbase, rather than bogies. Some units were equipped for operation as diesel multiple units.

== First generation ==
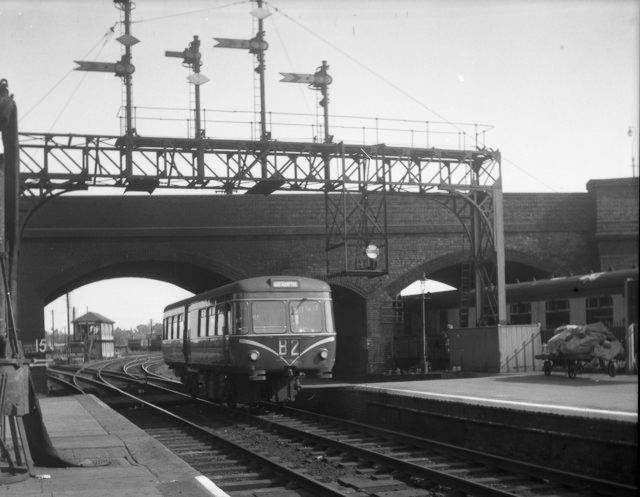
Park Royal railbus at Bedford Midland station

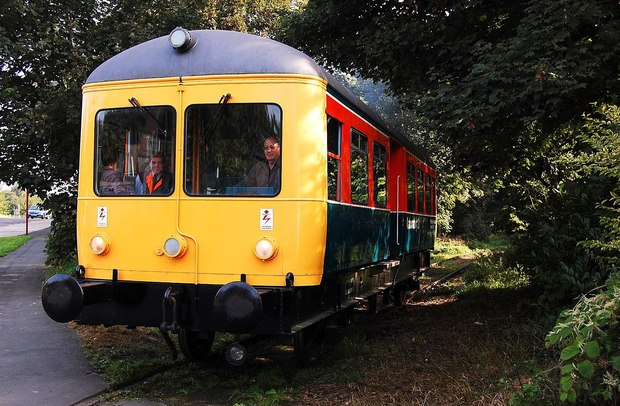
999507 Elliot on the Middleton Railway

In the late 1950s, British Rail tested a series of small railbuses, produced by a variety of manufacturers, for about £12,500 each (£261,000 at 2014 prices). These proved to be very economical (on test the Wickham bus was about 9 mpg_{‑imp} (31 L/100 km)), but were somewhat unreliable. Most of the lines they worked on were closed following the Beeching Cuts and, being non-standard, they were all withdrawn in the mid-1960s, so they were never classified under the TOPS system.

In addition to those railbuses, BR ordered three for departmental (non-revenue earning) service. The full list of passenger and departmental units is set out below.

Table of orders and numbers
Lot No.	Manufacturer	Diagram	Qty	Fleet numbers	Service life	Length over body	Seats	Notes
30483	Bristol / Eastern Coach Works	610	2	Sc79958–79959	1958–1966	42 ft 4 in (12.90 m)	56	
30482	Waggon- und Maschinenbau GmbH Donauwörth railbus	611	5	E79960–79964	1958–1967	45 ft 10 in (13.97 m)	56	
30481	D Wickham & Co	612	5	Sc79965–79969	1958–1966	38 ft 0 in (11.58 m)	48	
30480	Park Royal Vehicles	613	5	Sc79970, 79974; M79971–79973	1958–1968	42 ft 0 in (12.80 m)	50	
30479	AC Cars	614	5	W79975–79978; Sc79979	1958–1968	36 ft 0 in (10.97 m)	46	
	D Wickham & Co		1	RDB999507 Elliot	1958–1997			
	Drewry Car Co.		2	RDB998900-998901	1950–1990			

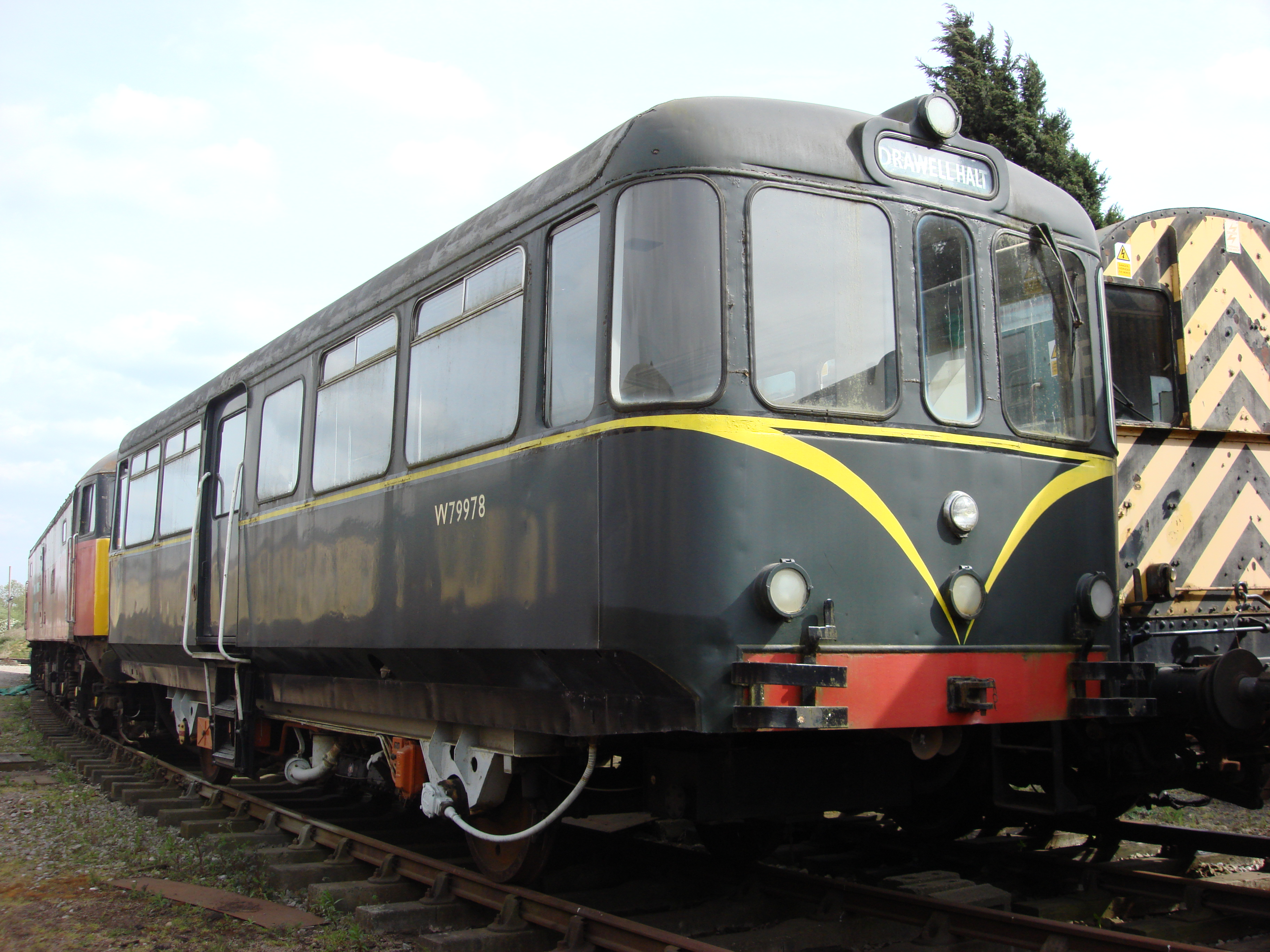
AC Cars railbus W79978 at the Colne Valley Railway

Engines:

- 79958/59, Gardner 6HLW of 112 bhp (84 kW) at 1,700 rpm
- 79960–62/64, Büssing, 150 bhp (110 kW) at 1,900 rpm
- 79963, AEC A220X
- 79965–69, Meadows 6HDT500 of 105 bhp (78 kW) at 1,800 rpm
- 79970–74, AEC, 150 bhp (110 kW)
- 79975–79, AEC, 150 bhp (110 kW)

== Leyland Experimental Vehicles ==
British Rail returned to the idea of railbuses from the mid-1970s, and prototype four-wheel vehicles were developed jointly by British Leyland and the British Rail Research Division. These were named Leyland Experimental Vehicles (LEVs) and consisted of double-ended Leyland National bodyshells (chosen for their strength and cost-effective manufacturing) mounted on top of simple 2-axled railway chassis, which were a derivative of those used on the HSFV.

The LEVs spent a substantial amount of time abroad in the hope of attracting export orders, however none were ever made. Domestically, the LEVs were the predecessors of the Pacer DMUs, of which the Class 140 is its closest relative.

In total, five LEVs were built, which are listed below:

Photo	Identity	Built	Design	History
	LEV1 No. RDB 975874	1978: Leyland/BREL Derby	12.3 m (40 ft 4 in) long. 2 doors (front right and back left).	It was built at Railway Technical Centre in Derby as an unpowered trailer and used for testing on the West Coast Mainline at speeds of up to 100 miles per hour (160 km/h). In 1979, it was converted to a self-propelled vehicle using a Leyland 510 diesel engine and was then tested at Old Dalby Test Track. In January 1980, it was shipped to the US and was tested on the Northeast Corridor between Boston and Attleboro and the Boston and Maine Railroad between Lowell and Concord. After returning to the UK, it was then tested in passenger service, primarily in East Anglia. It carried its last passengers in July 1983 and was withdrawn in 1987, when it was given to the National Railway Museum. In 2004, it moved to North Norfolk Railway and was restored, returning to passenger service in 2010. In 2012, it was moved to Wensleydale Railway via Locomotion Museum, Shildon. It stayed there until 2024, when it was moved back to Shildon.
	LEV2/R3 (for USA)	1980: Leyland/Wickham	15.3 m (50 ft 2 in) long. 2 doors (front left and back right).	It was exported to the US for use by MBTA on a new passenger route to Concord, New Hampshire, which it started running on 1 December 1980. On 15 December of the same year, it struck a car at a level crossing, killing two occupants of the car. After a period in storage, it was sold to Boston and Maine Railroad in May 1983 for use as a track inspection vehicle. It was then sold to Steamtown National Historic Site for use as a shuttle, but was damaged by a derailment and sold for scrap. It was bought and repaired by Durbin and Greenbrier Valley Railroad and was used for passenger excursions. In 2001, it was sold to Connecticut Trolley Museum, however by 2021 it had been scrapped.
	RB003/R3 (for BR) No. RDB 977020	1981: Leyland/BREL Derby	15.3 m (50 ft 2 in) long. 2 doors (front right and back left).	In 1981, it was shown to the press as a 'pre-production' unit of the then-envisioned future export railbuses. It was then used for demonstrations in the Bristol area. It was sold to Northern Ireland Railways in August 1982 and re-gauged for use on the Portrush branch. It proved to have insufficient passenger capacity, so was taken out of passenger service and used for track inspection duties. In July 1990, it operated the 'Cavan Coup' railtour from Belfast to Kingscourt via Drogheda. After being withdrawn in December 1992, it was first preserved at Ulster Transport Museum before going to Downpatrick and County Down Railway in 2001. In 2024 it was given to Gwendraeth Valley Railway, where it will be re-gauged again and repaired.
	RB002 'The Denmark'	1984: Leyland/BREL Derby	2 doors (front left and back left).	Between 1984 and 1986, it toured several countries as a demonstration vehicle, visiting Denmark, Sweden, the Netherlands, Germany, Canada and the US. It returned to the UK, having gained its nickname, and was used as a classroom and office by BREL for some time. It was then preserved at Riverstown Old Corn Railway, near Dundalk, which is thought to have happened in 1999. The site is now home to Carlingford Brewing Company, but the railbus was still there as of 2019, albeit in poor condition.
	RB004	1984: Leyland/BREL Derby	6 doors (front, middle and back on both sides).	It was first shipped to the US as a demonstration vehicle and was used for trials in the following locations: a preserved railway in Newport, Long Island Rail Road, the International Exhibition on Transportation Systems in Washington, (Note: It is unclear whether this was Washington D.C. or Washington State) New Orleans, SEPTA Regional Rail and Cleveland. It was then sent back to the UK and put into storage before later being used as a classroom by BREL in York. It was first preserved at Embsay and Bolton Abbey Steam Railway and then moved to Telford Steam Railway in 2004 and Aln Valley Railway in 2010. In 2011 it was purchased by Railbus Trust and visited Midland Railway – Butterley and Llangollen Railway before moving permanently to Waverley Route Heritage Association in 2012.

== Routes ==
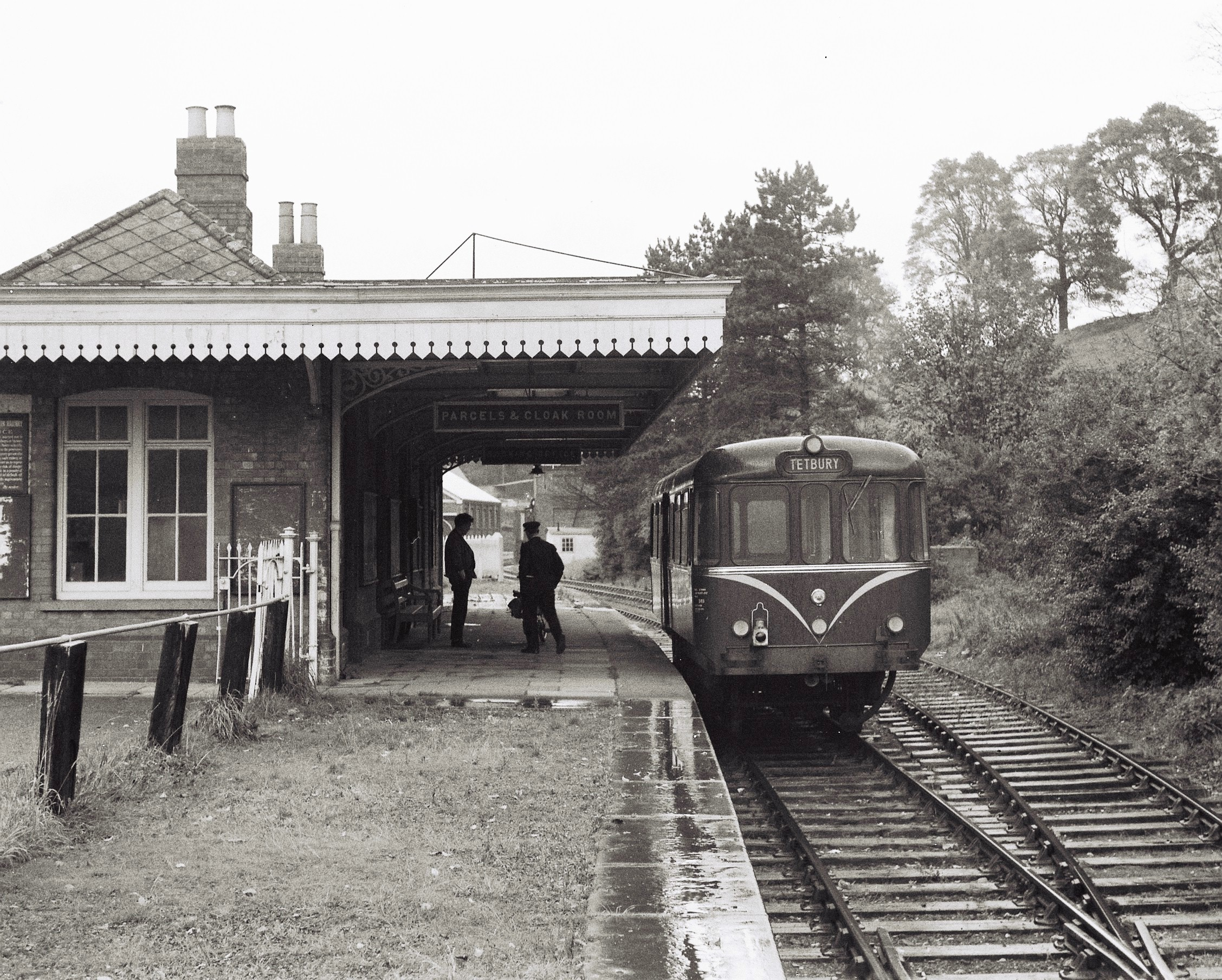
AC Cars railbus at Tetbury in the 1960s

Lines regularly served by railbuses include:

=== Scotland ===
- Ayr – Dalmellington 1959–1964
- Craigendoran – Arrochar 1959–1964
- Darvel 1959–1964
- Devon Valley 1959–1964
- Falkirk – Grangemouth 1967–1968
- Gleneagles – Crieff / Comrie 1958–1964
- Kilmarnock – Ardrossan / Ayr 1962-1964
- Larbert – Alloa 1967–1968
- Lugton – Beith 1959–1962
- Speyside 1958–1965

=== East Anglia ===
- Cambridge to Mildenhall railway
- Witham-Braintree branch line
- Witham-Maldon branch line
- Saffron Walden Railway

=== Midlands ===
- Bedford – Northampton / Hitchin 1958–1959
- Millers Dale – Buxton 1966–1967

=== Western ===
- Bodmin – Wadebridge 1964–1967
- Kemble – Cirencester Town and Kemble-Tetbury 1959–1964
- Yeovil Junction – Yeovil Town 1964–1966 – Pen Mill 1966

== Preservation ==
A number of the BR railbuses, both first and second generation examples have survived into preservation, as follows:

Vehicle no.	Builder	Year built	Location	Comments
First generation
79960	Waggon- und Maschinenbau GmbH Donauwörth	1958	Ribble Steam Railway	Formerly North Norfolk Railway
79962	Waggon- und Maschinenbau GmbH Donauwörth	1958	Keighley and Worth Valley Railway	—
79963	Waggon- und Maschinenbau GmbH Donauwörth	1958	East Anglian Railway Museum	Formerly North Norfolk Railway, now on loan
79964	Waggon- und Maschinenbau GmbH Donauwörth	1958	Keighley and Worth Valley Railway	—
79976	AC Cars	1958	Great Central Railway	Purchased in 1968 without its engine and moved to Bristol and then Bleadon and Uphill museum. Since then it has moved to Bodmin & Wenford Railway, County School railway station, Colne Valley Railway and then Great Central Railway, before moving to Nemesis Rail where it is stored as a sheeted-over carcass.
79978	AC Cars	1958	Swindon & Cricklade Railway	Sold to North Yorkshire Moors Railway in 1968 It was at the Kent & East Sussex Railway from 1979 to 1984, then moved to the Colne Valley Railway. In November 2019, it moved to the Swindon & Cricklade Railway.
RDB999507	Wickham	1958	North Dorset Railway	Elliot High-speed track-recording unit
RDB998901	Drewry Car Company	1950	Middleton Railway	Overhead-line inspection car
Second generation
RDB975874	Leyland/BREL Derby	1978	Wensleydale Railway	LEV 1
LEV2	Leyland/BREL Derby	1980	Connecticut Trolley Museum	Was subject to a project to repatriate to the UK but has been reported as scrapped in August 2021.
RDB977020	Leyland/BREL Derby	1980	Downpatrick and County Down Railway in Northern Ireland	LEV3 aka RB3. Has been regauged to 5'3”
RB002	Leyland/BREL Derby	198?	Riverstown Old Corn Railway? near Dundalk, Ireland	RB002 aka The Denmark
RB004	Leyland/BREL Derby	1984	Currently at the Whitrope Siding (arrived 31 May 2012)	Owned by Northumbria Rail Ltd. and The Railbus Trust. Moved from Telford Steam Railway to Llangollen Railway 20 May 2011 and then to Midland Railway Centre 19 August 2011

Additionally, AC Cars railbus 79979 was preserved. It was the first of the railbuses to be delivered and spent all its working life in Scotland. In 1968, it was moved to Craigentinny where the chassis was scrapped, and it was used as a battery store. It was moved to make way for the TMD in 1977 and the grounded body sold to the Strathspey Railway in 1977. It was scrapped by MC Metals, Glasgow, in 1990.

== See also ==
- British Rail Class 139
- Pacerailer - prototype railbus built 1960s, by a private company.
- Pacer (British Rail)
