= Resonate Group =

British transport technology company

Resonate Group Ltd
- Company type: Private
- Industry: Technology
- Founded: 2006
- Headquarters: Derby, United Kingdom
- Area served: UK
- Parent: Vision Capital
- Website: www.resonate.tech

Resonate Group Limited is a British software, technology and services company. Prior to September 2016, it was called DeltaRail Group Limited.

The company was formed from the Rail business of AEA Technology plc which was acquired as part of a secondary private equity portfolio sale to Vision Capital in 2006. On 21 January 2015, the four executive directors of the company acquired the business out of private equity ownership. The Resonate Group brand was adopted in September 2016. The company has UK offices in Derby (head office) and London.

== History ==
The origins of Resonate Group can be traced back to 1998 and the formation of AEA Technology plc's rail business following the acquisition of British Rail Research from the British Railways Board, which was amalgamated with several other engineering software organisations. It provided software, technology and services in three core areas; signalling control software, operational software and asset management products. Resonate Group has been accredited as a notified body and an Independent Safety Assessor in multiple countries, including the UK and the Netherlands.

By 2013, the company, then operating as under the name DeltaRail Group, was the largest provider of computerised signalling control systems in the UK. Various train operators have used the company's maintenance scheduling system, the XV edition of which was at one point the UK's leading railway maintenance management product. It has also been engaged in the production of numerous studies on behalf of other bodies, such as government agencies. The company routinely works in partnership with multiple rail infrastructure owners.

During the early 2010s, DeltaRail Group had responded to British national railway infrastructure owner Network Rail's traffic management programme, but it was not shortlisted in favour of larger overseas competitors; this decision was controversial as DeltaRail's bid had been roughly £1 billion cheaper, as well as involving a shorter timeframe, to deliver. One reported factor in this outcome was the allegedly poorly structured bid submitted. Nevertheless, by June 2016, with the programme underperforming, Resonate Group was reengaged in the process and, at its own expense, conducted a trial deployment of its system to prove its cost effectiveness and readiness for operations.

European Rail Software Applications (ERSA), a member of the Resonate Group, has long been involved in the development of the European Rail Traffic Management System (ERTMS), having performed Track-to-Train integration testing on the high-speed railway between The Netherlands and Belgium. Furthermore, Resonate develops and maintains the Integrated Electronic Control Centre (IECC) that has been widely used on Britain's rail networks; amongst other engagements, it was responsible for the first implementation of remote control of Solid State Interlocking (SSI) in 2013. The company has been involved in various parts of Network Rail's Digital Railway initiative, such as the development of a new timetable editor and other traffic management systems.
