= LMS Scientific Research Laboratory =

Railway research facility in United Kingdom

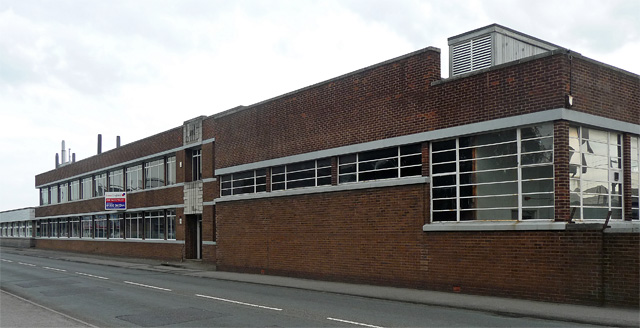

- Location within Derbyshire

General information
- Location: Derby, Derbyshire, London Road, England
- Coordinates: 52°54′35.3″N 1°27′32.6″W
- Opened: December 1935
- Cost: £50,000 (equivalent to £2,910,000 in 2025)
- Client: London, Midland and Scottish Railway

Technical details
- Floor count: 2

The LMS Scientific Research Laboratory was set up following the formation of the London, Midland and Scottish Railway in 1923.

In 1929, the Company President, Lord Stamp read a paper Scientific Research in Transport to the Institute of Transport, and, in 1930 he founded the Advisory Committee on Scientific Research for Railways.

The Scientific Research Laboratory was formed by the Vice-President and Director of Scientific Research, Sir Harold Hartley. Purpose-built accommodation was provided on the west side of London Road, Derby which opened in December 1935. The various paint and varnish laboratories were amalgamated and relocated there, joining the textile research from Calvert Street and the metallurgy and general engineering research in the locomotive works. In addition the laboratory liaised with various university departments, its remit covering all areas of railway operation.

In 1936 an aerodynamics laboratory was formed, located in the locomotive works, using 1/24 scale models. It was involved in the design work for Stanier's Coronation locomotives, and went on to assess smoke deflectors, carriage ventilation and the effect of passing trains on structures and passengers in stations. This passed to the Derby College of Technology in 1960. The Rugby Testing Station was opened in 1948 as a joint venture with the LNER.

Work continued into the nationalised era, when a decision was made to concentrate various headquarters functions, particularly that of the Chief Mechanical and Electrical Engineer, in one national centre. This produced the Railway Technical Centre (RTC) on the opposite side of London Road, on a site which had formerly been part of the Way and Works sidings. Part of the RTC would be occupied by a new British Rail Research Division, reporting directly to the Board, under the Chief Civil Engineer's Department. This went on, in addition to its other work into all aspects of the railway, to design the experimental version of the Advanced Passenger Train (APT-E). The Scientific Research Laboratory was renamed Hartley House, and formed the Scientific Services department of the Research Division.

Later, after British Rail privatisation and the sale of the Research Division to AEA Technology, the Scientific Services department was separately privatised to form the company Scientifics Ltd.

Since 2012, the laboratory buildings have been occupied by the Zaytouna School, an Islamic faith primary school.
