= Pacer (British Rail) =

Five classes of 1980s British diesel railbuses

- A Class 142 and Class 143 in 2018
- In service: 1984–2021
- Family name: Pacer
- Constructed: 1979–1987
- Scrapped: 2020–present
- Number built: 165 sets
- Number scrapped: 79 sets (141/142/143/144)
- Formation: 2 cars per unit (140/141/142/143/144)/ 3 cars per unit (144)

Specifications
- Coupling system: Tightlock (140 and 141 as built); BSI (others)
- Track gauge: 4 ft 8 1/2 in (1,435 mm) standard gauge

Pacer was the operational name of the British Rail Classes 140, 141, 142, 143 and 144 diesel multiple unit railbuses built between 1980 and 1987. They were inexpensively developed using a passenger body based on the Leyland National bus on top of a chassis based on the HSFV1 research vehicle. The railbuses were intended as a short-term solution to a shortage of rolling stock, with a lifespan of no more than 20 years. As modernised replacements were lacking, the Pacer fleet remained in service on some lines until 2021, 37 years after its introduction in 1984.

All Pacer trains were scheduled to be retired by the end of 2019, as the PRM-TSI requires that all public passenger trains must be accessible to disabled people by 2020; however, the Pacer units were given dispensation until the end of 2020. Only one Pacer (the modernised 144e) met this requirement and the remainder were, therefore, planned to be withdrawn by that date. Furthermore, a decision in 2015 by the Transport Secretary required that such railbuses be removed from service by 2020 for the then-new Northern franchise, stating that the "continued use of these uncomfortable and low-quality vehicles is not compatible with our vision for economic growth and prosperity in the north."

At the start of 2020, 138 Pacer units of Classes 142, 143 and 144 were either still in service or storage with three National Rail operators: Arriva Rail North, Great Western Railway and KeolisAmey Wales. After the 144s were withdrawn from the Northern franchise, Northern Trains retired its last Pacer unit, a Class 142, on 27 November 2020, with Great Western Railway retiring its last 143 the following month. KeolisAmey Wales withdrew only its 142s in late 2020, passing its 143s to Transport for Wales, which phased them out in May/June 2021.

== Features ==
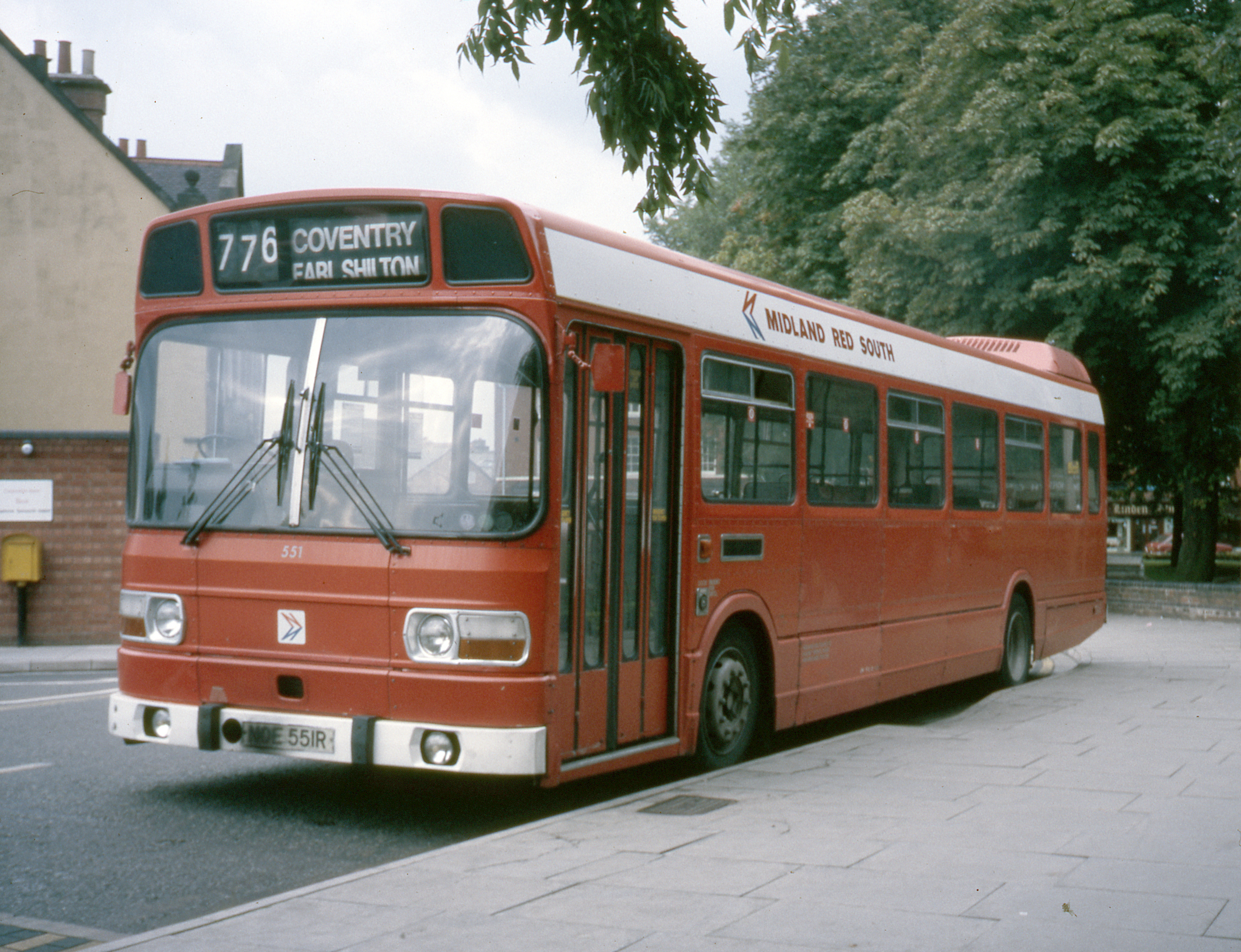
Some Pacers were based on the Leyland National bus

The Pacer series were built with low construction and running costs in mind, and so all of the Pacer units used:

- A lightweight modified bus body and other bus components, such as seating, with a reinforced driver's cab area to comply with crashworthiness standards.
- A long-wheelbase four-wheel freight-wagon-inspired underframe, rather than the conventional arrangement of two four-wheeled bogies. This arrangement was criticised for rough-riding, and causing loud noise and excessive wear to the wheels and track on tight curves.

== Background ==
By the beginning of the 1980s, British Rail (BR) operated a large fleet of first generation diesel multiple units (DMUs), such as the Class 101, which had been constructed in the 1950s and 1960s to various designs. While formulating its long-term strategy for this sector of its operations, British Rail planners recognised that there would be considerable costs incurred by undertaking refurbishment programmes necessary for the continued use of these ageing multiple units, particularly due to the necessity of handling and removing hazardous materials such as asbestos. In light of the high costs involved in retention, planners examined the prospects for the development and introduction of a new generation of DMUs to succeed the first generation.

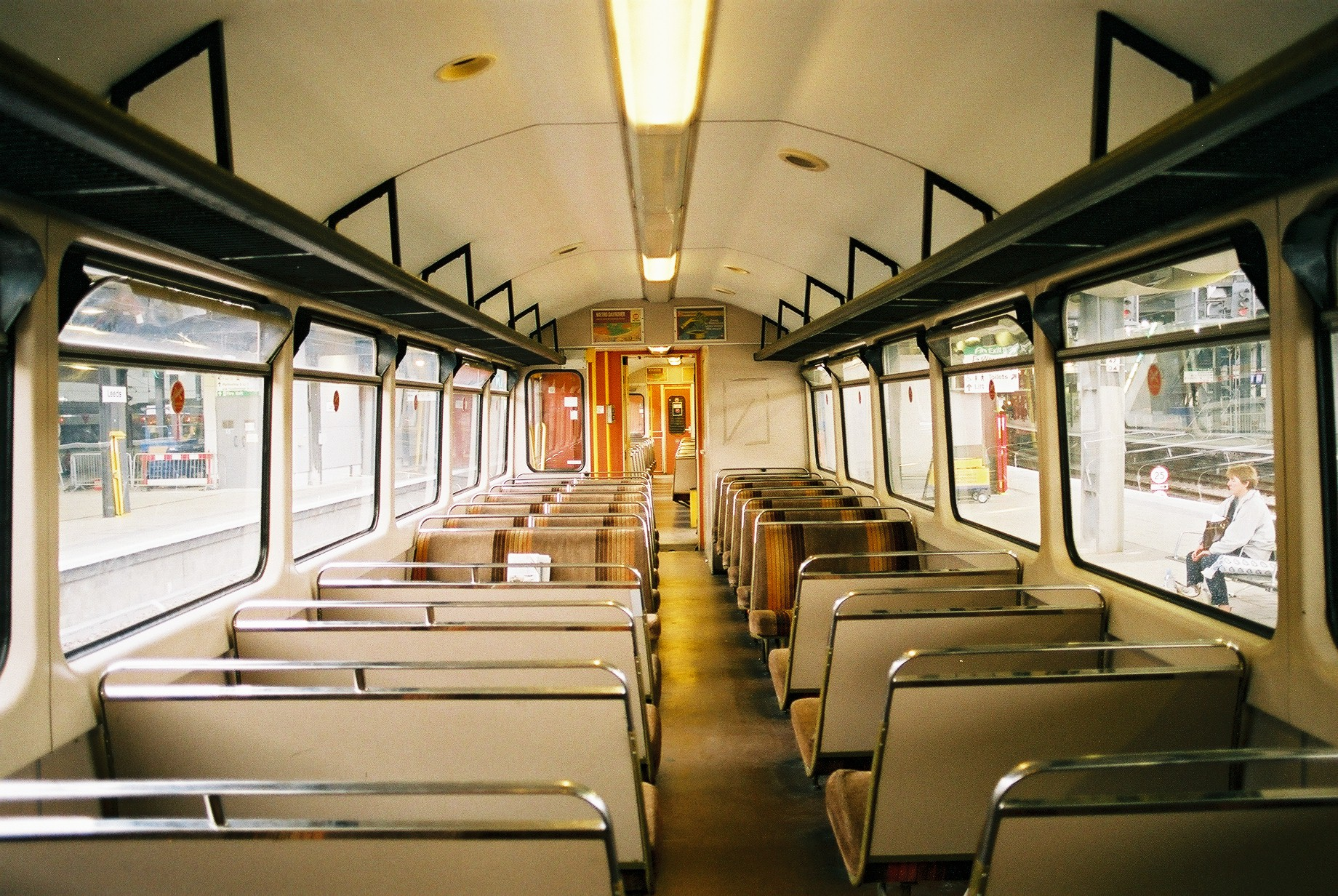
The bus-style bench seating originally used on a Class 144 Pacer

During the early 1980s, BR developed two separate approaches towards developing a second generation of DMUs. The first involved the development of substantial DMUs which could deliver performance superior to the existing fleet, especially on long-distance services. This ultimately led to the development of the Class 150 and Class 151 prototypes, and the wider Sprinter family of DMUs. Financial restraints led to the development of the second approach involving the so-called railbus that prioritised the minimisation of both initial (procurement) and ongoing (maintenance and operational) costs; BR officials recognised that a cheaper unit was desirable for service on the smaller branch lines that would not be unduly impacted by lower performance specifications or a high-density configuration. As such, work to progress both approaches was undertaken by BR's research department.

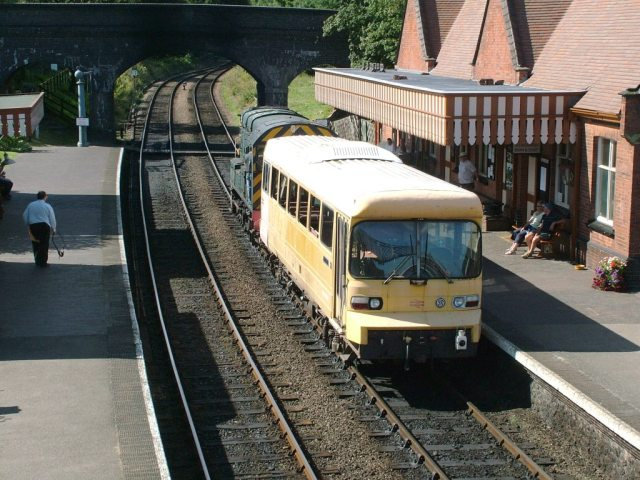
LEV1, an early prototype for the Pacer series

During this period, a number of prototypes were constructed to explore different designs and approaches for implementing the railbus concept. The initial prototype, known as Leyland Experimental Vehicle (LEV) 1, was a joint project by the British Rail Research Division and Leyland Motors and used a Leyland National bus body mounted on modified freight vehicle underframe (High Speed Freight Vehicle (HSFV) 1). A subsequent test vehicle, a single two-car unit, designated as the Class 140, was constructed between 1979 and 1981. The principal difference between the Class 140 and the preceding R3 concept was the incorporation of the underframe structure into the body above, thus making the latter a load-bearing structure. Other changes included the strengthening of the cant rail area (where the roof meets the side) and the use of standard BR multiple unit ends, enabling compliance with full Union Internationale des Chemins de fer (UIC) end load specifications for multiple units. Internally, a mixture of standard railway multiple unit seating and bus seating was installed. The resulting railbus was relatively lightweight, as had been desired by BR's concept.

The Pacers had originally been intended as a low-cost stopgap solution to the rolling stock shortage, with a maximum lifespan of 20 years. A total of 165 Pacer trains (totalling 340 carriages) were built for BR. By 2015, the majority of these remained in operation with various private train operating companies, despite the type being in excess of 30 years old. Outside of the UK, Pacer demonstrator units toured various nations, including the U.S., Belgium, Sweden, Thailand, Malaysia and Indonesia, without producing significant sales. Iran purchased redundant Class 141 units, for use on suburban lines around Tehran until 2005.

== Class 140 ==
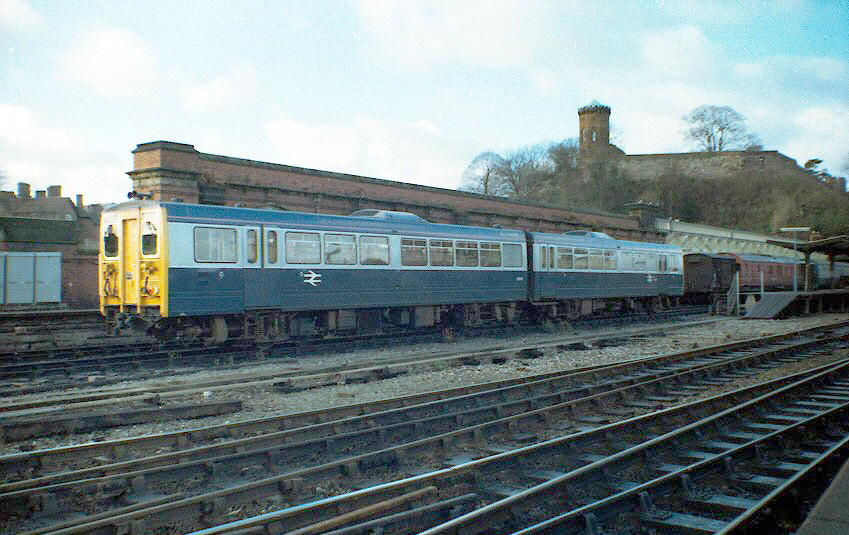
The prototype Pacer Class 140

The Pacer series was the result of an experiment to assess the viability of using bus parts to create a diesel multiple unit. The two-car Class 140 was a prototype vehicle that was built in 1980 at British Rail Engineering Limited (BREL)'s Derby Litchurch Lane Works. This prototype was introduced with much fanfare during June 1981. During its trial period, the Class 140 toured various lines across the UK. It later functioned as a demonstration unit for the incoming fleet based on the type, the Class 141. By 1985, the unit was in use as a driver training vehicle. From September 1986, the sole Class 140 was allocated to Neville Hill.

Initial testing with the Class 140 uncovered several issues, such as difficulty detecting the type via track circuits, this was reliably resolved by swapping the material of the brake blocks from a composite to iron. Two less easily addressable drawbacks were the high level of noise generated during transit, particularly on older jointed rails, which was a consequence of the railbus's direct connection between the underframe and suspension with the body that transmitted impact forces across the body. It was also observed that the inclusion of strengthening members in the mass-produced bus body added significantly to the overall production cost, which eliminated much of the cost advantage that was the primarily goal of the type. The original traction power train of the Class 140 consisted of a Leyland TL11 200 hp (150 kW) engine, a Self-Changing Gears mechanical automatic gearbox and a Gmeinder final drive unit on each car driving only a single axle. This propulsion arrangement was in part taken from the Leyland National bus. The controller for the automatic transmission was observed by BR engineers to the cause of numerous operating failures and other reliability issues; this was allegedly due to defective relay logic and poor earthing.

== Class 141 ==
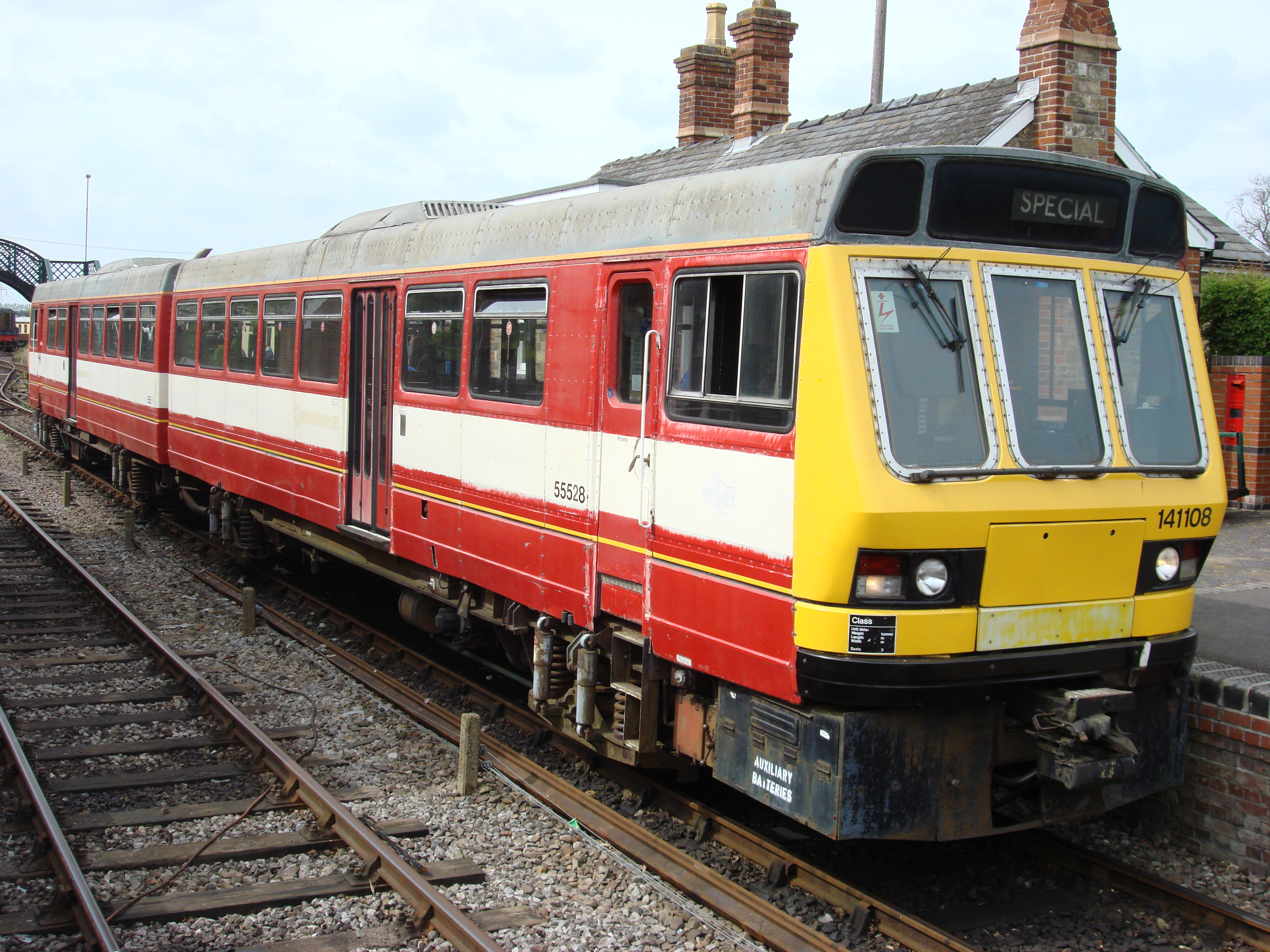
A preserved Class 141 at the Colne Valley Railway. The resemblance to the bus is clear by the flat roof and windows.

The Class 140 was viewed to be an overall success, and thus BR issued an order for an initial production model, designated Class 141, to British Leyland during 1984 with production commencing thereafter. During its early years of service, the Class 141 experienced numerous issues, particularly with the transmission and ride quality; work undertaken at BR's direction resulted in the quick development of numerous improvements to at least partially address these shortcomings. When it came to ordering more railbuses, however, it was decided that instead of placing these follow-on orders for further Class 141, it would be more desirable to procure improved derivatives of the Class 141. Accordingly, BR placed orders for two new models of the Pacer family with separate manufacturers, these being the Class 142 and Class 143 respectively.

The prototype was joined by another 20 two-car units which formed the Class 141 fleet. The units were used mainly in Yorkshire, operating on predominantly suburban services. They had a capacity of 94 passengers per two-car set, and two Leyland TL11 engines gave a total of 410 bhp (310 kW), resulting in a top speed of 75 miles per hour (121 km/h). The Class 141s were built with standard Leyland National bodies, whose comparatively narrow width meant they could only be fitted with standard bus seating. The later Pacers had widened body panels to allow increased seating. Furthermore, in order to maximise cost savings, the manufacturers made use of road bus-standard electrical equipment, passenger fittings, and general cab layout wherever possible.

During 1988, in response to reliability problems related to the electronics used, the entire class was briefly withdrawn and underwent a technical upgrade at the Hunslet-Barclay works in Kilmarnock. The reliability issue was largely resolved via the replacement of the original relay-based controller of the transmission with an alternative that was microprocessor-based. The units were permanently withdrawn from British Rail service in 1997. Many Class 141s were sold to Islamic Republic of Iran Railways.

== Class 142 ==
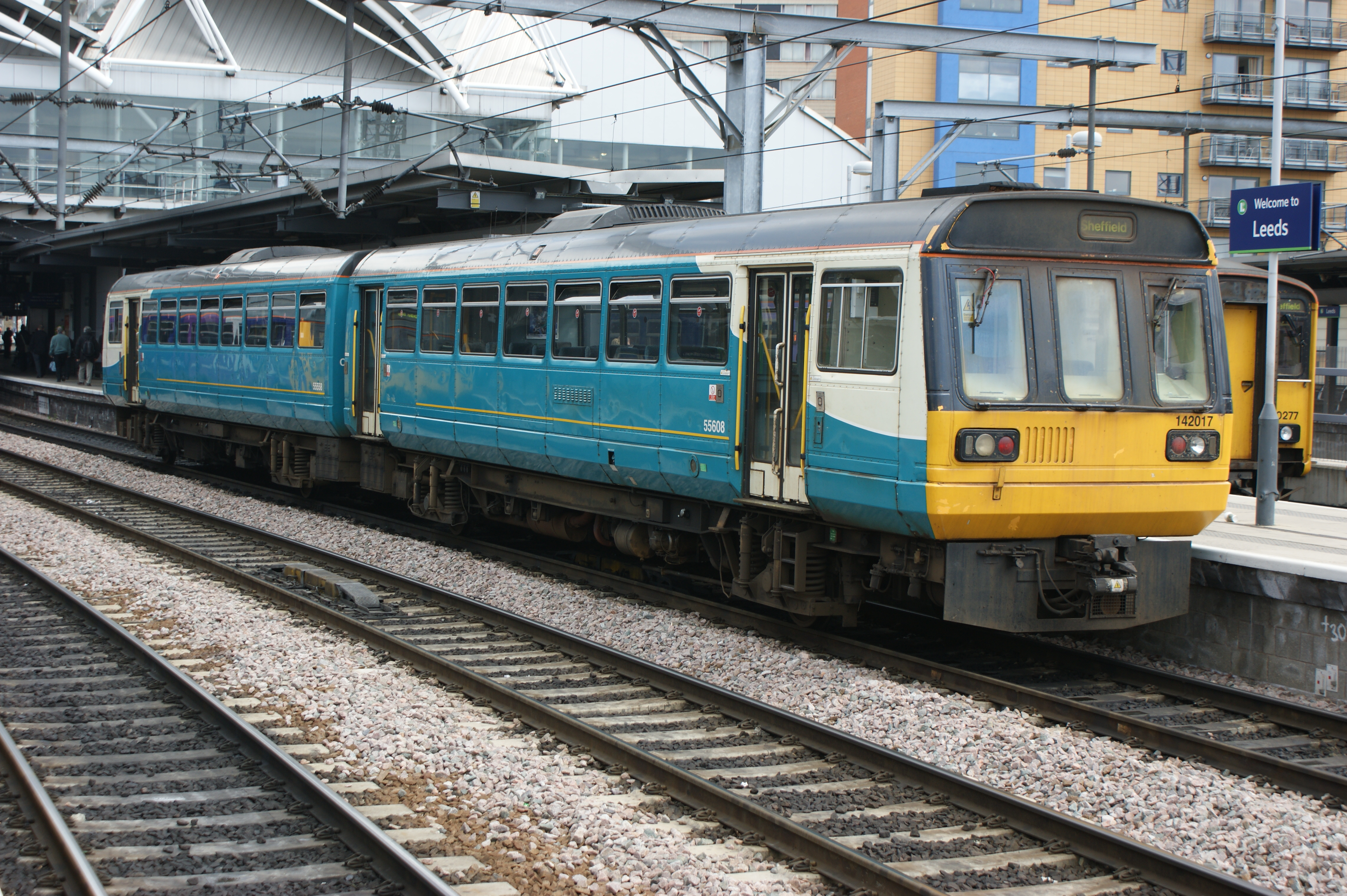
A Northern Rail Class 142 Pacer in debranded Arriva Trains Wales livery at Leeds

The next and largest Pacer class was the Class 142. As BR was considering ordering more railbuses, it was decided that, instead of placing these follow-on orders for further Class 141 vehicles, it would be more desirable to procure improved derivatives of the Class 141. Accordingly, BR placed orders for two new models of the Pacer family with separate manufacturers, these being the Class 142 and Class 143 respectively.

The Class 142 again was built by Leyland and BREL, in 1985. The body was based on a Leyland National bus, built at Workington in Cumbria. Many fixtures and fittings of the Leyland National could be found on the units. The new class had a greater capacity of 120 passengers per two-car set and the same engines were used. The first sets were used initially on Devon and Cornwall branch lines and on commuter services in the north west. The units from Cornwall were eventually moved to Liverpool and the north east, and the Class 142s became a common sight on services across the north of England.

The Class 142s received substantial upgrades during the early 1990s, which included the installation of more powerful Cummins engines, which gave a total power output of 460 bhp (340 kW) per two-car set. A number of units were then modified for use on the Merseyside PTE City Line on Merseyrail in the Liverpool region, which included dot-matrix route indicators, improved seating and Merseyrail PTE paintwork.

The Class 142s moved into the control of Arriva Trains Northern and First North Western at privatisation, and subsequently passed on to Northern Rail, Arriva Rail North, Northern Trains, Arriva Trains Wales, KeolisAmey Wales and Transport for Wales Rail. Eight Northern Rail units were temporarily withdrawn from service, replaced by a cascading of British Rail Class 158s. First Great Western received 12 units on loan from Northern Rail from December 2007 to November 2011 (five units were returned to Northern Rail in December 2008) to cover for refurbishment of its fleet and to allow most of its Class 158 fleet to be rebuilt as three-car sets.

== Class 143 and Class 144 ==
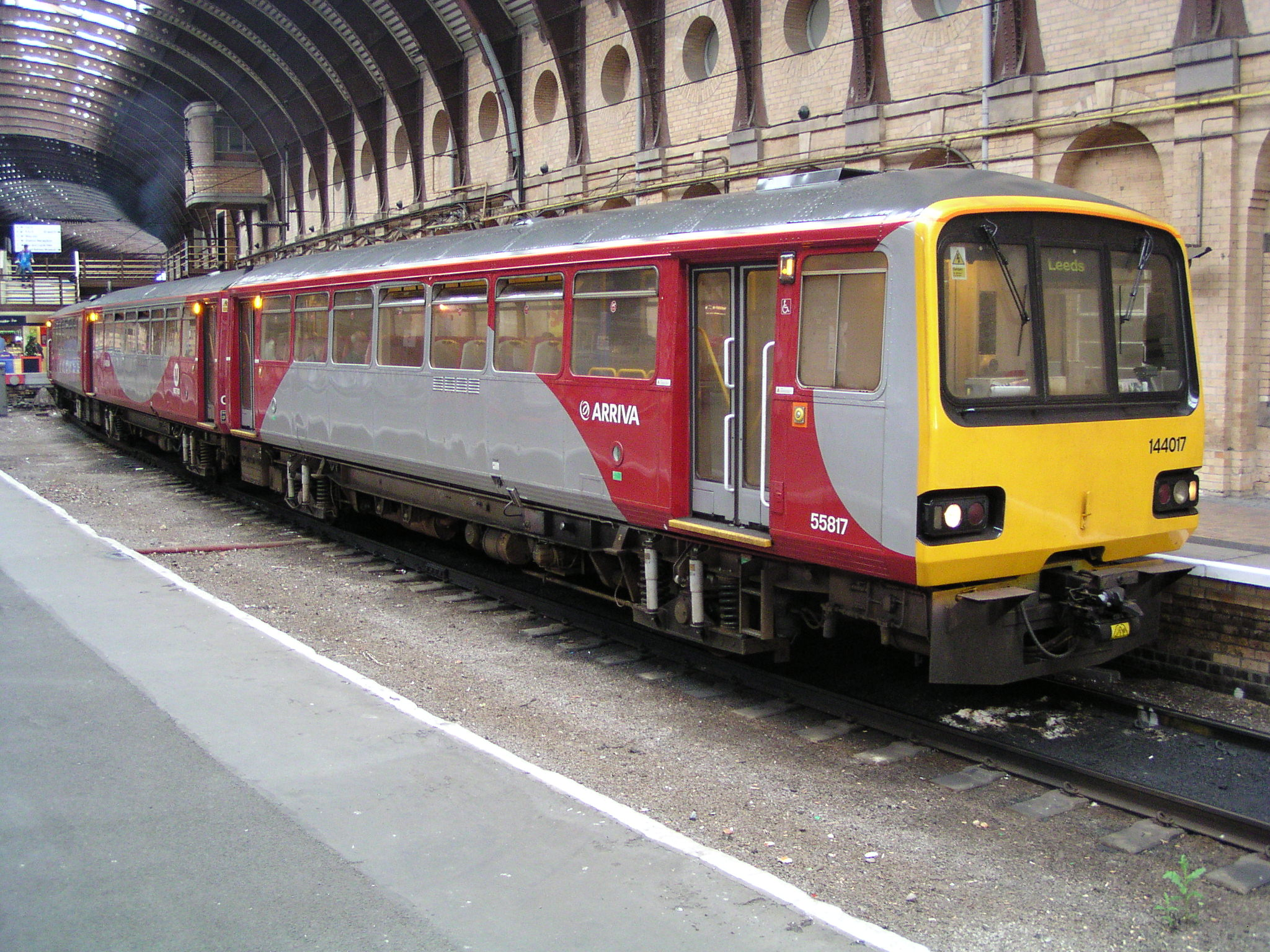
Three coach Class 144 at York

Around the same time of the Class 142 development, a Pacer railbus was being developed by Kilmarnock based Hunslet-Barclay. The units used a Walter Alexander bus body. The units were given the number Class 143 and entered service in 1985. Again with two 205 bhp (153 kW) engines giving a total output of 410 bhp (310 kW) and a top speed of 75 mph (121 km/h), the class originally had a capacity of 122 passengers. The class was used in the North East before being transferred to Wales and the South West, and were moved over to Valley Lines and Wales & West control during privatisation. They then passed on to Arriva Trains Wales, Wessex Trains, First Great Western and Transport for Wales. The interiors were completely changed in 2000, when the Valley Lines service was introduced, with full back, coach-type seating installed throughout, along with improved fittings. This reduced seating capacity to 106 seats per set.

It was followed by the similar Class 144, comprising a Walter Alexander body on BREL underframe, which was introduced in 1987. The most substantial design change was the replacement of the Leyland-built engine with a more powerful Cummins LTA10-R counterpart, as well as the original mechanical transmission being replaced by a Voith hydraulic unit. A Class 144 unit was formed of either a two-car set with 122 seats or a three-car set with a total capacity of 195 passengers and 690 bhp (510 kW), though still limited to 75 mph (121 km/h). The units were used in the North East, passing to Northern Spirit at privatisation, then to Arriva Trains Northern, Northern Rail, Arriva Rail North and Northern Trains.

== Analysis ==
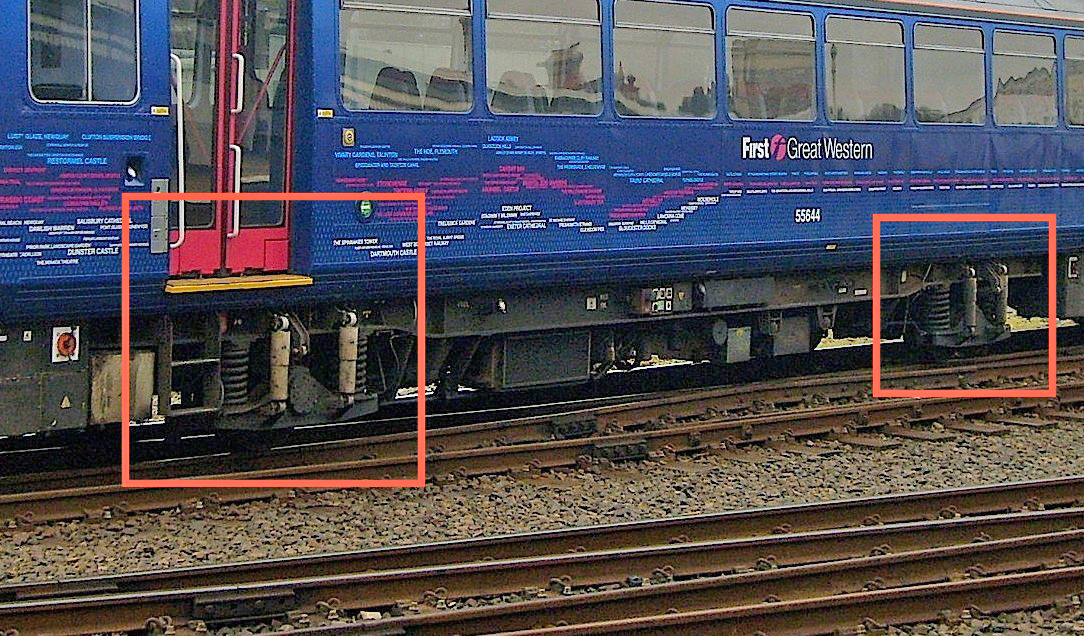
Unlike traditional DMUs, Pacers lack bogies, instead featuring a single axle fitted directly to the chassis at the end of each coach.

The Pacers were often criticised as being of poor quality. Instead of the usual bogies, Pacers used a basic four-wheel two-axle configuration which often results in a ride which is noisier and less comfortable than other trains. The lack of articulation can result in a rough ride, especially over points, and a loud squealing noise around tight curves. The lack of bogies also results in a more basic suspension, which can result in a bumpier ride; this gave rise to the nickname "nodding donkeys" owing to the trains' up-and-down motion on uneven track. The basic bench seating can also be uncomfortable. The early units, especially the Class 141s, were also especially unreliable.

The fact that Pacers were only used in certain areas of the north and south-west of England, and the south of Wales, but not London or the south-east of England, also created resentment.

Concerns were raised about safety after the 1999 Winsford crash, which involved a First North Western Class 142 Pacer running as empty stock, which was involved in a collision with a Virgin Trains Class 87-hauled express after the Pacer unit had fouled the main line at Winsford, Cheshire on the West Coast Main Line. The body of the Pacer was severed from its frame, to which it was attached by wire straps, causing severe internal damage; the unit was written off. Twenty-seven passengers and crew were injured, four seriously. However, all passenger injuries were on the other train, as the Class 142 was running empty at the time.

Arguments have been made that Pacers were the saviour of some branch lines, with their low costs and relatively good fuel economy of 10 miles per imperial gallon (28 L/100 km; 8.3 mpg_{‑US}) making them a pragmatic solution at a time when budgets were tight. This has however been disputed, with the reasoning that since rolling stock costs make up a low proportion of the total cost of running a service, the lines would have remained open even without Pacers. Furthermore, given the modifications or upgrades made to the units' engines, doors, fire protection, gearboxes and brakes in the first decade of their service, the total build cost of the units in some cases exceeded those of an equivalent Sprinter unit.

== Replacements ==
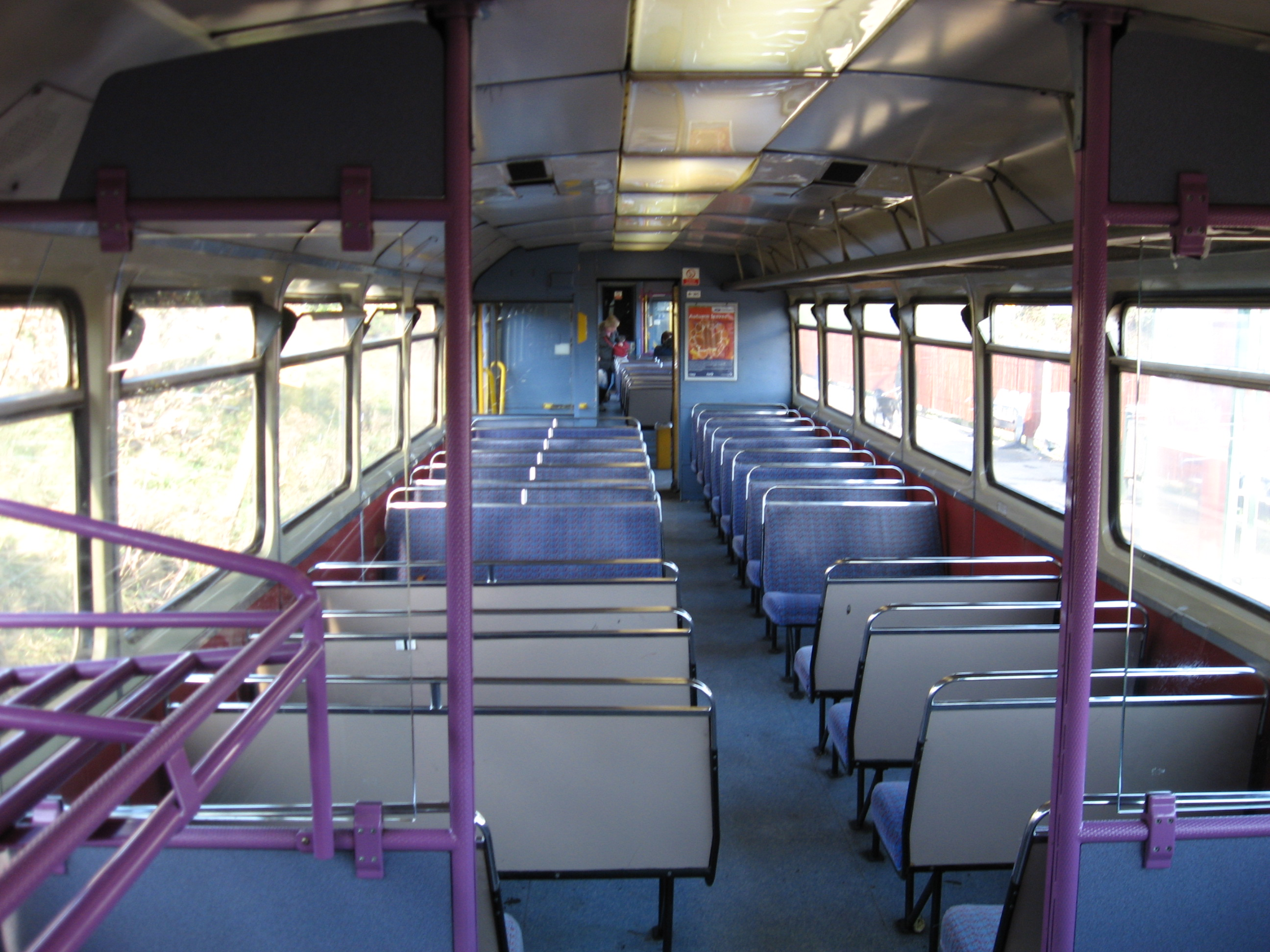
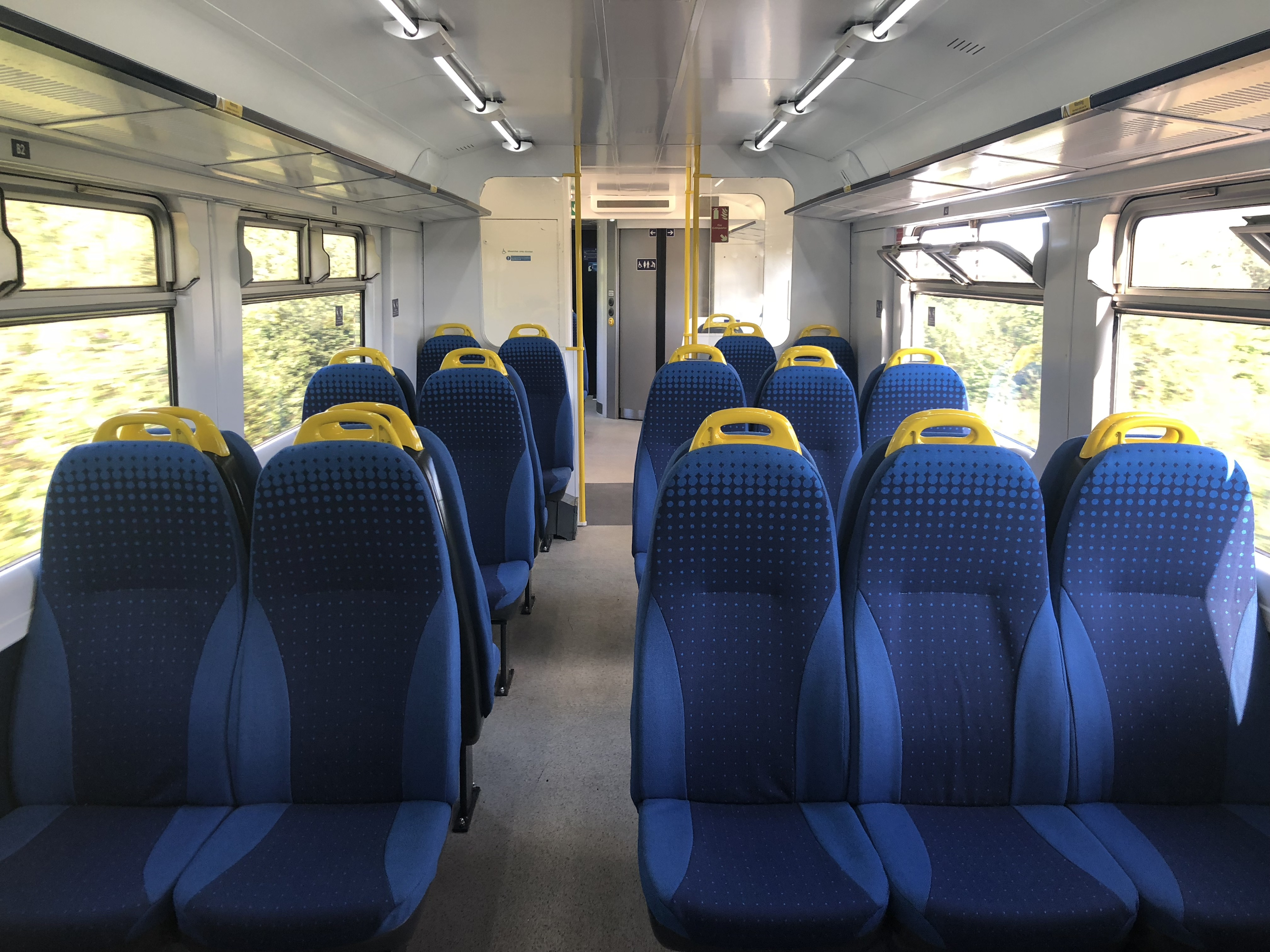
Pacers were primarily replaced by upgraded Class 150 units (see second picture) from other lines following the introduction of the Class 195. The Class 150 offers more capacity and in many cases operate as four-carriage services.

As of 2020, the oldest Pacers on the national network were approaching 35 years old. All were planned to be withdrawn and scrapped by December 2019 as they do not comply with Rail Vehicle Accessibility Regulations. The first wave of class 142 withdrawal began in November 2020 by Northern, and a month later by Transport for Wales. Class 143 and 144 units also saw massive withdrawals in the late months of that year, the first 143 and 144 units being withdrawn in December 2020 by Great Western Railway and Northern. Transport for Wales were granted an extension of Pacer usage until May 2021.

=== CAF Civity ===
In July 2019, rollout of Northern's CAF-built Class 195 Civity units had begun on certain routes, which allowed refurbished Sprinters no longer needed on those routes to be used to replace Pacers instead.

=== Vivarail D-Train ===
These units are built out of upcycled London Underground D78 Stock, constructed between 1978 and 1981, which were in service on the District line until 2017. Conversion of the old stock to mainline railway use will involve re-using the aluminium bodyshells, traction motors and bogies from the D78 units and fitting them out with new diesel engines and interiors. The D-Train units underwent acceptance testing in 2015 and Vivarail pitched them to train operating companies (TOCs), especially those bidding for the Northern franchise. While no orders were received from Northern, Transport for Wales will replace its Pacers with a combination of five D-Trains and rolling stock cascaded from other train operators, and other TOCs have ordered D-trains to replace other outdated rolling stock: South Western Railway for the Isle of Wight's Island Line, and West Midlands Trains for the Marston Vale line.

=== Class 144e Evolution ===
The Class 144e (Evolution) was a proposed refurbished variant of the Class 144 which would bring it up to the requirements of the Persons with reduced mobility-Technical Specifications for Interoperability accessibility regulations. The demonstrator Class 144e unit (144012) featured a number of upgrades such as the addition of new 2+2 style seating, a fully accessible toilet, two wheelchair spaces and spaces for bicycles and luggage, as well as Wi-Fi and media screens. Porterbrook, which owns the Class 143 and Class 144 fleets, refurbished unit 144012 in 2014 to comply with the new legislation so that it could act as a demonstration unit. The demonstrator unit was expected to re-enter traffic in April 2015, but this was delayed until later in the year. Porterbrook cut its losses on the failed concept and resold the train to Network Rail in 2021, and the Class 144e unit perished with the other Class 144 trains.

== Preservation ==
Over the course of the series' withdrawal, several Pacers have been preserved for further use on heritage railways. The National Railway Museum has preserved a train with the designation number 142001.

In May 2019, the government called for a public consultation on re-using the trains after withdrawal from service; suggestions have included re-using them as public spaces, such as village halls or cafes.
