= High Speed Freight Vehicle =

British prototype railway vehicle

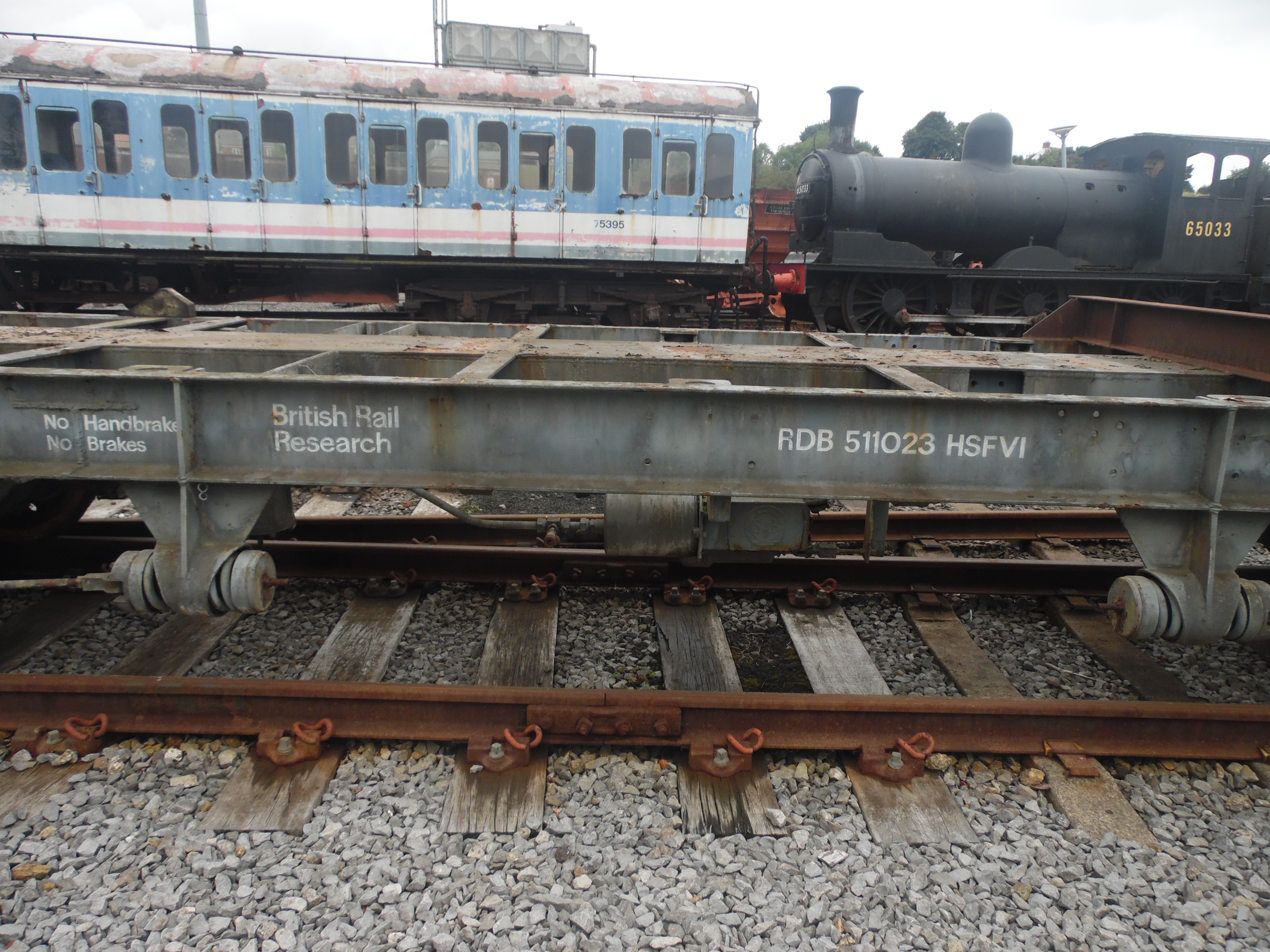
HSFV1 found at the Locomotion: the National Railway Museum at Shildon.

The High Speed Freight Vehicle was a generic term for a number of prototype four-wheeled rail vehicles which were fitted with various experimental suspensions developed by the British Rail Research Division in the late 1960s. The development was part of the investigation into the riding of vehicles and the interaction between wheel and rail.

HSFV1 was intended for fundamental empirical research into wheel-rail interaction and suspension dynamics to be better understood, following from work on wheel tread profiles. It was regularly run at speeds of up to 140 mph (230 km/h) on the Vehicles Laboratory's roller rig. It also performed at 90 mph (140 km/h) whilst under test on the main line. Its suspension had two vertical coil springs and two vertical and one lateral hydraulic damper at each corner of the vehicle. This was at a time when few freight trains travelled at more than 40 mph (65 km/h) and most passenger trains averaged about 70 mph (110 km/h). It supported theories of vehicle design which led to most later designs of train.

A similar converted UIC long-wheelbase four-wheeled ferry van (HSFV4) was utilised for high-speed trials. HSFV4 had two coil springs with two 45-degree-inclined hydraulic dampers and a traction rod at each corner.

Although they were excellent riding vehicles in the railway of the day they were viewed as experimental only and far too expensive for widespread adoption. It was also thought that the sophisticated suspension would not stand up to the daily rigours to which freight vehicles were subjected.

However in the early 1970s these experiments resulted in ten covered air-braked vans (COV-AB) being fitted with Taperlite suspension consisting of a long double leaf spring and having hydraulic dampers inclined at 45 degrees to effect both vertical and lateral movement. On test these vehicles were capable of 90 mph (140 km/h) but in service were limited to 75 mph (120 km/h) due to their running with other UIC long-link suspension vans. Ultimately they were converted to standard after a few years, except two examples. One of these was used by the R&DD on the Tribometer train and one by the DM&EE on their own test trains.

HSFV1 survived in Serco stock at the RTC, but in May 2010 was moved out on its way to preservation. It was intended that it would eventually be displayed at the Electric Railway Museum in Coventry, but that museum closed. HSFV1 was donated to the APT-E preservation Group by Serco after the National Railway Museum chose not to preserve it, but NRM relented in April 2018 and it is now displayed at Shildon alongside the restored APT-E, which benefitted from the fundamental research carried out into wheel/rail interaction with HSFV1. HSFV4 is also still extant at the Eden Valley Railway where it is undergoing restoration.

A number of vehicles were produced, including HSFV1 and HSFV4, with various tests being carried out between 1975 and 1979. A variant of HSFV1 formed the basis for the suspension of the Class 140 Pacer railbus.
