= British Rail Research Division =

Railway research organisation

Coordinates: 52.9103°N 1.4561°W

- Industry: Improvements to railways
- Founded: 1964
- Defunct: 1996
- Fate: Privatised
- Successor: DeltaRail Group
- Headquarters: Railway Technical Centre, Derby
- Parent: British Railways Board (1964-1996)

The British Rail Research Division was a division of the state-owned railway company British Rail (BR). It was charged with conducting research into improving various aspects of Britain's railways, particularly in the areas of reliability and efficiency, including achieving cost reductions and increasing service levels.

Its creation was endorsed by the newly created British Rail Board (BRB) in 1963 and incorporated personnel and existing resources from all over the country, including the LMS Scientific Research Laboratory. It was primarily based at the purpose-built Railway Technical Centre in Derby. In addition to its domestic activities, the Research Division would provide technology and personnel to other countries for varying purposes and periods under the trade name "Transmark". It became recognised as a centre of excellence in its field; the theoretical rigour of its approach to railway engineering superseded the ad hoc methods that had prevailed previously.

Its research led to advances in various sectors, such as in the field of signalling, where progress was made with block systems, remote operation systems, and the Automatic Warning System (AWS). Trackside improvements, such as the standardisation of overhead electrification equipment and refinements to the plasma torch, were also results of the Research Division's activities. Perhaps its most high-profile work was into new forms of rolling stock, such as the High Speed Freight Vehicle and railbuses, which led to the introduction of the Class 140. One of its projects that gained particularly high-profile coverage was the Advanced Passenger Train (APT), a high-speed tilting train intended for BR's Intercity services. However, due to schedule overruns, negative press coverage, and a lack of political support, work on the APT was ceased in the mid-1980s in favour of the more conventional InterCity 125 and InterCity 225 trainsets.

The Research Division was reorganised in the runup to the privatisation of British Rail during the 1990s; the bulk having become "BR Research Limited". This unit was acquired by the private company AEA Technology in 1996, which has since become Resonate Group. Several elements of its work have continued under various organisations, such as the patents filed during the APT's development being harnessed in the development of the Pendolino, a modern high speed tilting train.

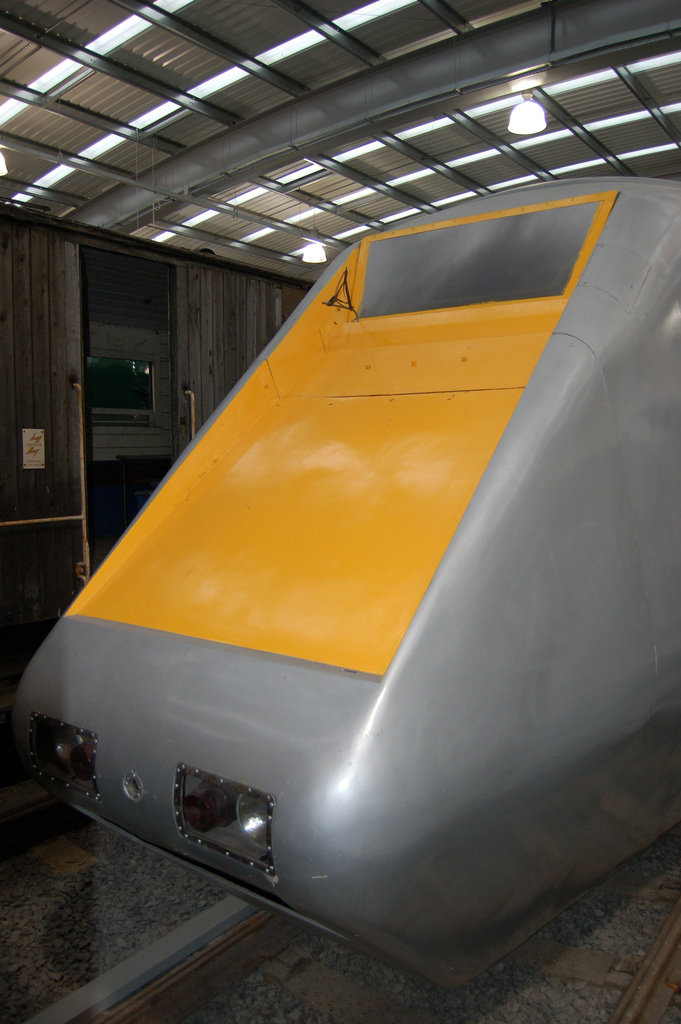
APT-E at National Railway Museum Shildon

== Background ==
During the mid-1950s, it became increasingly apparent to senior figures within the British Transport Commission (BTC) that, in light of mixed results from using external contractors, there was value in British Rail performing some research projects in-house instead. In August 1958, Dr F. T. Barnwell was appointed by the BTC to prepare and present specific electrical research proposals; the creation of an initially small Electrical Research Section employing 31 staff was also authorised by the BTC in July 1960. Many of these early proposals were related to traction and power equipment, such as motor control, signalling, digital computers, and 25 kV AC railway electrification. Several existing research efforts, such as into rail adhesion, were also folded into the new section's remit; in June 1960, the Rugby Locomotive Testing Senter was also transferred to the Chief Electrical Engineer's responsibility and became a key site for the section.

During 1963, the newly created British Rail Board (BRB) agreed to transfer the Electrical Research Section to the British Rail Research Department, with the purpose of forming a completely new division. The Research Division brought together personnel and expertise from all over the country, including the LMS Scientific Research Laboratory. Its remit was not simply the improvement of existing equipment, or the solution of existing problems, but fundamental research from first principles, into railway operation. The results of its work would go on to inform development by engineers, manufacturers and railways all over the world. For instance, once the initial APT-E experimental project was complete, it passed to the mechanical engineering department to build the APT-P prototype. In time, engineers would be seconded to other countries for varying periods under the trade name "Transmark".

One early matter for this new division was the choice for a long term location, Rugby being passed over in favour of Derby, where the purpose-built Railway Technical Centre was built during the 1960s at a cost of £4 million. Nearby, the Research Division developed its first test track on the old Great Northern Railway line between Egginton Junction and Derby Friargate (later used only as far as Mickleover) and was used by the Train Control Group. Later on, when the revolutionary Advanced Passenger Train (APT) was being developed, a second test track was created on the line between Melton Junction and Edwalton (known as the Old Dalby Test Track), which was acquired specifically to test this train. The Mickleover test track was closed and lifted in the early 1990s, however Old Dalby remained in use into the twenty-first century.

== Projects ==
Early benefits of the Research Division's work were already being felt by the late 1960s in the field of signalling, specifically in block systems. While practical demonstrations were being performed as early as 1964, some of these efforts, such as an early use of radar-based obstacle detection, proved to be not mature enough for deployment. One project of this nature that was highly impactful on future railway operations was the creation of automated simulations of traffic flow through a network. In response to concerns by managers of the British Rail's Southern Region, the Research Team developed improvements for the Automatic Warning System (AWS), sometimes referred to as Signal Repeating AWS, which would be deployed extensively in that region. Another early advance was the remote control of freight locomotives at low speed, such as when coal trains were delivering their materials to power stations.

By the mid-1960s, the Research Division had multiple traction-related projects underway, however, they were negatively impacted by the sudden death of senior engineer James Brown. Work into the use of induction drives, for both rotary and linear motors, was one such project; a rail-mounted trolley was developed and tested as part of this research. It was concluded that, largely due to the cost of the aluminium reaction rail necessary, linear motors were not economically practical at that time. The division has also collaborated with English Electric to produce a heavily modified demonstrator, converted from a redundant early diesel electric locomotive, to evaluate the rotary induction motor. Other advances made by researchers in the field of overhead electrification, such as hydraulic dampers and flexible contact wire supports, greatly aided the Modernisation of the West Coast Main Line.

During the late 1960s, attention was paid to expanding the Research Division's mathematical capabilities. This heavily contributed to the development of Junction Optimisation Technique (JOT), an approach for optimisating traffic flows through complex junctions (such as that outside of Glasgow Central railway station). The arrival of more powerful computers around this time allowed for time-based, rather than event-based, traffic simulations to be programmed as well, leading to the General Area Time-based Train Simulator (GATTS).

By the end of the 1960s, the division has made progress in the area of rail adhesion; influenced by French experiments with spark discharges, development of what became the plasma torch proceeded based on promising test results gathered in 1967. Subsequent testing provided even better results; however, progress was badly impacted by the departure of Dr Alston in 1971. The division also provided support in troubleshooting issues encountered with the recently deployed overhead electrification apparatus; the development of simpler and standardised equipment and further research into digitally simulating the dynamic behavior of overhead equipment proceeded. The success of these efforts were such that, having been initially authorised for a five-year period, the BRB approved a further 11-year extension in 1973, thus continuing the Research Division's work in these areas through to March 1985.

One key research project was examining the tendency of new wheels to hunt, which was counteracted by deliberately profiling, or pre-wearing, wheels. During the 1960s, an extensive study was performed by the aeronautical engineer Alan Wickens, which identified dynamic instability as the cause. Concluding that a properly damped suspension system, both horizontally as well as vertically, additional research led to additional projects, such as the High Speed Freight Vehicle, which started work during the late 1960s and reaching a high point during the mid-1970s. Various tests of the High Speed Freight Vehicle were carried out between 1975 and 1979. An even more radical freight vehicle, the Autowagon, was also worked on during the early 1970s; the concept of individual self-powered container-carrying wagons automatically loading, traversing the rail network, and unloading as required. This project never proceeded beyond demonstrations and studies into the control systems required.

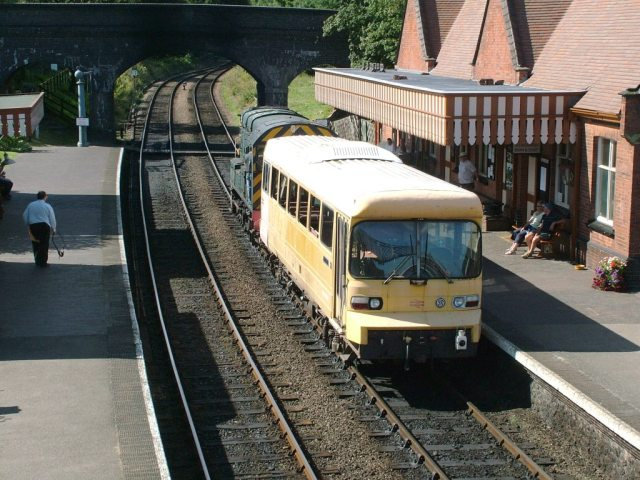
The prototype railbus LEV1

During the mid-1970s, British Rail became interested in introducing a new generation of railbuses; thus, the Research Division collaborated with British Leyland to jointly develop and evaluate several prototype four-wheel vehicles, commonly referred to as LEVs (Leyland Experimental Vehicle). These prototypes were essentially Leyland National bus bodies mounted on a modified High-Speed Freight Vehicle chassis. Testing commenced in 1978. A more capable two-car prototype railbus, the Class 140, was built between 1979 and 1981. Following its early use as a testbed, during which the Class 140 toured several different regions across the UK, it later served as a demonstrator for the subsequent production units based on the type, the Class 141, introduced in 1984, and Class 142, introduced in 1985. These subsequent production classes diverge from the Class 140's design in numerous places; one example is the separation between the underframe and the body above by a flexible mounting, a reduction in the depth of the underframe for maintenance accessibility, and the use of road bus-standard electrical equipment, passenger fittings, and general cab layout.

Likely the most prominent project undertaken by the Research Division was the Advanced Passenger Train (APT), a high-speed tilting train intended to accelerate Britain's Intercity services. This work, begun during the mid-1960s, was in part motivated, and influenced, by the recent success of the Japanese Shinkansen line between Tokyo and Osaka. The use of tilting permitted the alignment of the lateral forces with the floor, in turning higher top speeds to be attained before passenger comfort was adversely impacted. An active tilting system, using hydraulic actuation, was to enable the APT to round corners 40% faster than conventional counterparts. The prototype APT-E, powered by gas turbines, conducted its first run on 25 July 1972. Due to trade union opposition, it did not run again on the main line until August 1973. During testing on the Great Western Main Line, the prototype achieved a new British railway speed record on 10 August 1975, having reached 152.3 mph (245.1 km/h). However, by the early 1980s, the project had been running for over a decade and the trains were still not in service. The APT was quietly abandoned during the mid-1980s in favour of the more conventional InterCity 125 and InterCity 225 trainsets.

Other work involved looking at the tamping of ballast, properties of subsoils, and rail prestressing. A large part of the network had been converted to continuous welded rail which, during a hot summer, caused many problems with rail buckling; although there were no injuries, there were a number of derailments. Evaluations were conducted into the methods, costs, and benefits of tamping the ballast over the sleeper ends. There were extended studies into metal fatigue, and pioneering work in ultrasound crack detection at a time when it was being investigated elsewhere for medical diagnostics. Major signalling breakthroughs made by the Research Division included Solid State Interlocking and the Integrated Electronic Control Centre.

== Reforms and privatisation ==
In 1986, finance for the division was moved from the board to the operating divisions. Thus emphasis shifted from pure research to problem solving. During 1989, BR Research became a self-contained unit working under contract to British Rail and other customers, and the route was open for privatisation.

When British Rail was sold into private ownership during the 1990s, the Research Division (which had become "BR Research Limited") was bought by AEA Technology in 1996. The resulting business, "AEA Technology Rail", was subsequently sold in 2006 to a venture capital company and became DeltaRail Group. Transmark, the consultancy arm, was sold to Halcrow to become Halcrow Transmark.

A somewhat dated display of material relating to the work of the Division was maintained in the Derby Industrial Museum.

== Legacy ==
The Research Division had an uneasy relationship with other parts of BR, and like most of the products of Harold Wilson's "white heat of technology" speech, were killed off in the early 1980s. The basis of the unease was the traditional approach of most of BR compared with theoretical and aerospace approaches adopted by the Research Division. The hiring of graduates rather than training people up internally also caused tensions.

It could be somewhat tactless, or perhaps naive, at times. The APT-E was provided with a single driver position central in the cab, at a time when the unions were resisting the loss of the "second man" (the fireman in steam days). After its first run out to Duffield the APT-E was blacked (boycotted) by the unions for a year.

Nevertheless, its empirical research into vehicle dynamics has produced today's high speed trains, both freight and passenger, including the InterCity 125 and InterCity 225. The concept of a tilting system for the APT became part of the Pendolino, while the products of its signalling and operations control research are used over a significant amount of the British railway system.
