= Ricardo-AEA =

- Type: Limited company
- Founded: 26 September 2012
- Headquarters: Harwell, Oxfordshire
- Website: www.ricardo.com

Ricardo-AEA Ltd, trading as Ricardo Energy & Environment, is a UK-based engineering company. At its height, it was the largest specialised environmental consulting firm in the UK.

Ricardo-AEA was formed on 8 November 2012 when Ricardo acquired the business, operating assets and employees of AEA Technology Plc (also known as AEAT and AEA Europe) for £18 million. At the time, AEA Europe's operational staff numbered around 400, located at five UK sites. Within a year, the combined company had achieved profitability. Three years later, it started trading as Ricardo Energy & Environment.

== History ==
=== AEA Technology plc ===
During September 1996, AEA Technology was privatised, having previously operated as the commercial division of the United Kingdom Atomic Energy Authority (UKAEA). In 1998, the company reported a pre-tax profit of £29 million on a turnover of £308.4 million, and was employing around 4,500 people at various sites worldwide. It was also a constituent of the FTSE Fledgling Index. Early on, AEA Technology had consisted of divisions with expertise in a wide variety of areas, mostly the products of nuclear-related research. These included nuclear safety, nuclear engineering, environmental protection, battery technology and non-destructive testing. It mainly acted as a contractor organisation for UKAEA and other governmental and private customers.

Alongside its environmental consultancy work, the company also worked in the fields of programme management and knowledge transfer. The business was organised around a mesh style "communities" structure which includes knowledge leadership (key technical consultants), project management, marketing, sales, and IT. The company's main UK operations were located at the Harwell Science and Innovation Campus in Oxfordshire (head office), London, Risley and Glasgow.

In 1998, AEA Technology completed the acquisition of British Rail Research from the British Railways Board, establishing its own rail business thereafter. Eight years later, AEA Technology sold its rail business via a secondary private equity portfolio sale to Vision Capital in 2006, becoming Resonate Group Ltd (previously DeltaRail Group Ltd).

In 2000, a five year framework agreement was signed between AEA Technology and National Air Traffic Services, expanding on their prior collaboration, under which the former supplied industry experts in aviation safety and risk assessment to the latter. One year later, a new sub-division, EHS Solutions, was created with a remit to build an environment, health and safety software business. It acquired the environmental data management system Monitor-Pro and the health and safety software business Lexware. Significant resource was put into product development, but the market at the time was not sufficiently mature, and Monitor-Pro was ultimately divested in 2006, followed by the former Lexware systems.

On 11 March 2002, AEA Technology inappropriately transported a 2.5 tonne ^{60}cobalt gamma radiation source from Cookridge Hospital, Leeds to Sellafield with defective shielding; the company admitted six breaches of the regulations governing the transport of radioactive material and was fined £250,000 for the incident.

During the mid 2000s, the company opted to divest many non-core elements of its business and to cut 7 percent of its headcount after being negatively impacted by cuts enacted by Network Rail; one such divestment was NS Technisch Onderzoek, which was rebranded as DEKRA Rail BV. AEA's profitable engineering software business was split into two and sold to Aspen Technology (Hyprotech) and Ansys (CFX).

In August 2006, the firm established a Romanian subsidiary, AEA Mediu; this unit was shut down in April 2009. The company was voted best Consultancy for Climate Change and Renewables in the EDIE Awards 2007. During November 2007, the company stated its plans to expand its Scottish workforce, and that it was examining several modest Scottish technology companies for prospective acquisition.

As part of an effort to be less reliant upon its home market, AEA Technology acquired US-based competitive Eastern Research Group in exchange for £60 million in October 2010. That same year, shares in the firm decreased in value by roughly one third and were even temporarily suspended on the stock exchange, leading to 60 redundancies amid moves that reportedly reduced its cost base by 10 percent.

The company's share valuation saw a sustained long-running slump: from 277p in November 2003 to around 0.4p in January 2012. During November 2011, CEO Andrew McCree resigned his position; he was replaced by John Lowry as Interim CEO, who had previously worked as a restructuring advisor for the National Health Service. During July 2012, it was reported that, on account of a pension deficit of more than £165 million, the company was practically unsellable. In August of that same year, AEA Technology went into administration.

=== Under Ricardo ===
In November 2012, it was announced that the international engineering and management consulting specialist Ricardo had agreed terms to purchase AEA Technology in exchange for £18 million. Following the completion of the acquisition, it was rebranded as Ricardo-AEA. While Ricardo took on the environmental business and many of the staff, integrating them into its own operations, the large pension liability built up from when AEA Technology was much larger and unsupportable by the smaller residual company, was transferred to the UK Government's Pension Protection Fund. Within one year of the acquisition, Ricardo-AEA was reporting positive fiscal performance alongside expansion within the UK and international markets.

In September 2015, Ricardo-AEA announced that it was rebranding as Ricardo Energy & Environment.

Dating back to the AEA Technology era, the firm has operated a division that was at one stage known as the Energy Technology Support Unit (ETSU). For a time, it has used the branding as "Future Energy Solutions (incorporating the Energy Technology Support Unit (ETSU))". Another former division of AEA Technology was Momenta. This provided services to the public sector, offering services including research management, knowledge transfer, best practice, fund management and behaviour change programmes. Its major programmes included Envirowise for DEFRA and Knowledge Transfer Partnerships for the Technology Strategy Board. Momenta and the Digital Solutions Business (a small IT sub unit) were merged into the rest of AEA in the UK, creating AEA Consulting (an internal name) or AEA Europe.

During June 2025, it was announced that the Canadian consultancy firm WSP Global was set to acquire Ricardo in exchange for £363.1 million.

== See also ==
- ESR Technology, a former arm of AEA Technology, working in reliability, safety, and risk
