= Solid State Interlocking =

Railway signalling system

A GEC-manufactured SSI interlocking cubicle

Solid State Interlocking (SSI) is the brand name of the first generation processor-based interlocking developed in the 1980s by British Rail's Research Division, GEC-General Signal and Westinghouse Signals Ltd in the UK. It was a forerunner to the modern computer-based interlocking (CBI) systems in widespread use today.

== Technology ==
=== Interlocking hardware ===
SSI utilises a two-out-of-three redundancy architecture, whereby all safety-critical functions are performed in three separate processing lanes and the results voted upon. An SSI interlocking cubicle comprises three Interlocking Processors or Multi Processor Modules (MPMs), two Panel Processors and a Diagnostics Processor (DMPM). In the event of a single MPM failure, an SSI system is capable of continuing to operate on the two remaining MPMs; furthermore, the interlocking functionality does not actually require the DMPM to be operational, as this is used for the technician's terminal only.

=== External hardware ===
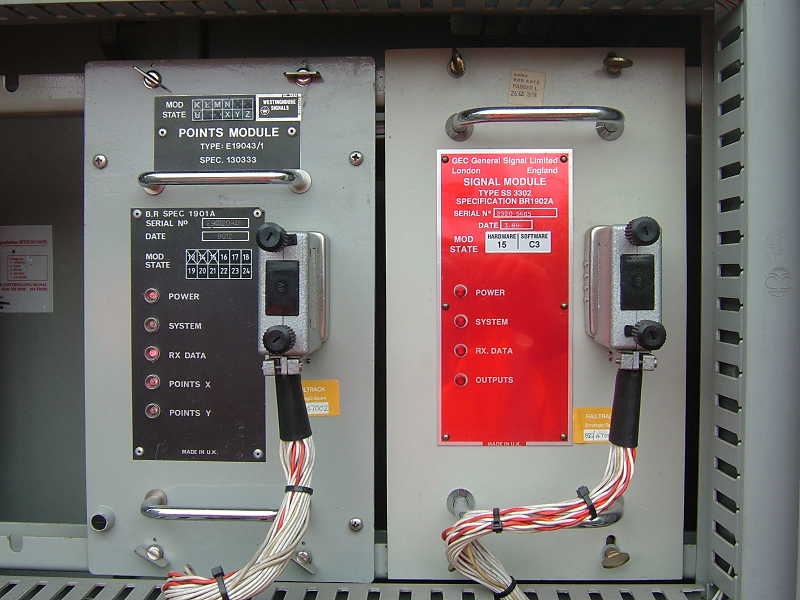
Trackside functional modules (points module on left, signal module on right)

Trackside equipment such as signals and points are connected to nearby 'trackside functional modules' (TFMs). Each module has a number of outputs and inputs. Each output drives an individual function, such as a signal lamp or an AWS inductor. Certain outputs are capable of driving a flashing lamp directly. The inputs are used to send information back to the interlocking, such as indications determined by track circuit relays or points detection circuits, for example.

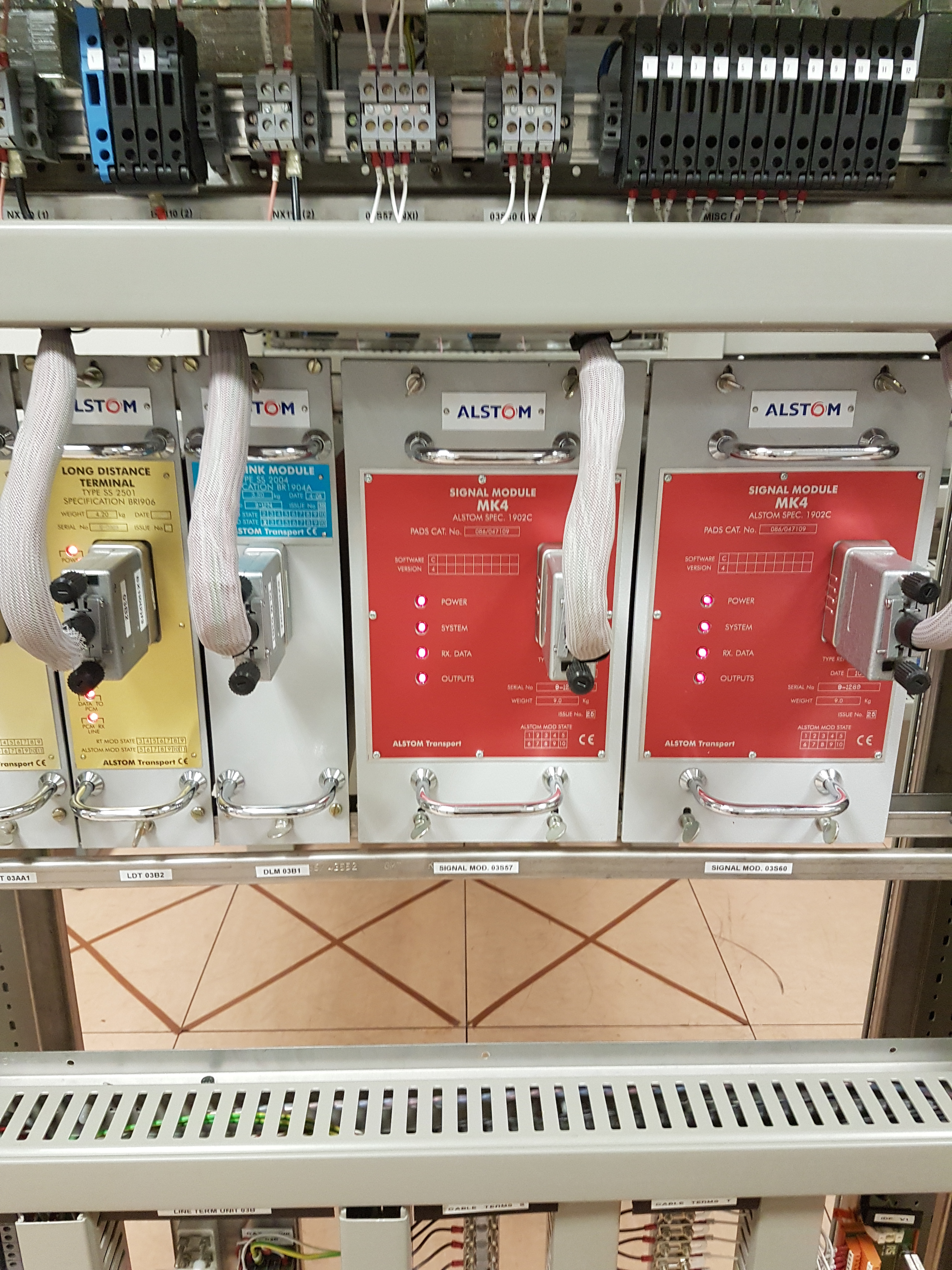
Alstom SSI Modules

There are two kinds of TFM; the signal module (identified by a red label) and the points module (black label). A maximum of 63 TFMs may be addressed by one SSI interlocking; in practice the number will be limited by timing issues and the need to allow for future expansion.

=== Data ===
Geographic interlocking data, relating to the area of railway under control, is installed using EPROMs contained in plug in memory modules. The interlocking program contained in each of the MPMs interprets this data to allow safe passage of trains through its area of control.

=== Data links ===
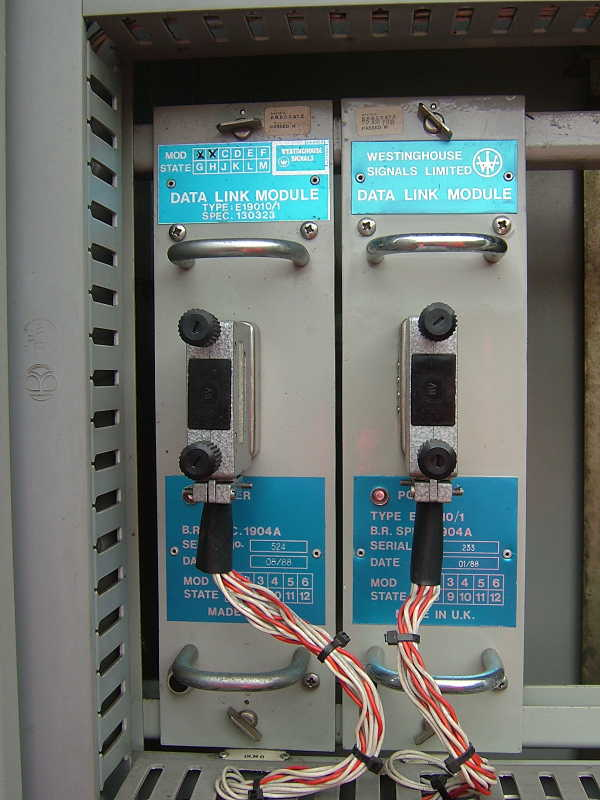
A pair of data link modules

Communication between interlockings and TFMs is by electronic data packages termed 'telegrams'. Telegrams are transmitted via 'data links', comprising twisted pair copper cable. The data links are duplicated for availability.

A 'data link module' (DLM) is the interface between the data link and the TFMs. A DLM has a blue label.

For transmission over longer distances, fibre-optic cable and pulse-code modulation may be used. Another type of module, the 'long distance terminal' (LDT) is available for this purpose. An LDT has a gold coloured label.

== Market penetration and future ==
Having been developed in the UK, SSI has been widely installed across Great Britain, and has some penetration of other Western European markets. The first operational deployment of SSI was at Dingwall in 1984, where it was used in conjunction with Radio Electronic Token Block (RETB) signalling. One year later, the first conventional SSI scheme was implemented at Leamington Spa. That same year, the application design commenced for the use of SSI on the first phase of London's then in-development Docklands Light Railway (DLR): this combined the SSI with automation of the route setting and the train driving (ATO/ATP). By 1990, 32 SSI central interlockings were controlling the East Coast Main Line between York and Berwick-upon-Tweed; furthermore, several major railway stations across Britain, including Marylebone and Liverpool Street, were also being operated using SSIs by this point. By 2019, there were 450 SSIs across the Network Rail-owned railways.

SSI's performance quickly drew international interest, and the technology was widely exported. The largest customer on continent Europe was Belgium, which at one point operated around 200 SSIs, while Portugal implemented at least 100 instances. During 1997, France's SNCF also commissioned its first SSI-based signal box; by 2010, 59 SSIs were in service across France, some of which were controlling over 1,000 routes.

SSI has also been installed in Indonesia, Hong Kong and other countries. Australia is an extensive user of SSI, particularly New South Wales, where it is installed at busy locations such as Hurstville - Oatley, North Sydney, Wyong, Granville, Enfield, Blacktown, Olympic Park and others within the Transport Asset Holding Entity network. During May 2022, the largest SSI implementation in the world was commissioned at Bandel Junction in West Bengal, India.

In service, SSI has demonstrated higher than anticipated reliability: while the average mean time between failure (MTBF) of the equipment was calculated to be around 2.5 years, long term real world performance has shown an average MTBF of ten years. In 2025, there were reportedly 600 SSI deployments, comprising in excess of 50,000 TFMs, that were in service at various locations around the world.

Due to the positive performance of SSI, both Alstom and Siemens have released products (Smartlock and Westlock respectively) which copy a number of its features. In particular, both manufacturers opted to re-use the SSI data preparation language and trackside equipment. One advantage of these later products, referred to as computer-based interlocking (CBI), is that the arbitrary limit of 63 TFM has been raised so high that a large interlocking can be handled without needing to split the logic into small chunks. A further advantage is that they are designed to be programmable with an operator’s specific signalling principles, offering greater flexibility as a result.

== History ==
Throughout much of the 20th century, early signal boxes that were typically manually-operated and limited to line-of-sign operations were being progressively replaced by larger power signal boxes, which made extensive use of electromechanically-operated relays that required sizable equipment rooms and frequent servicing. During the 1970s, these relays, which were relatively labour-intensive to produce as well as being expensive to maintain, were anticipated to rise in both cost and difficulty to procure as the wider electronics industry was in the process of transitioning to solid-state electronics. By the late 1970s, it was becoming apparent that a software processor-based system could have the potential to succeed relay based interlockings. Accordingly, a team at British Rail Research Division begun in-depth work into the prospective replacement of BR's existing electromechanical relay-based interlocks by electronic SSI. The benefits of such a scheme included achieving greater levels of both reliability and speed while also reducing space and wiring requirements.

During 1980, three reports produced by a SSI working group were published; these detailed the planned pilot scheme, the safety impact, and the new technology's effects. It was determined that introducing SSI offered savings in three key areas – interlocking equipment, line circuits, and panel circuits; furthermore, that the correct safety techniques would provide an adequate safety level in principle, which had been developed from experiences gained with other microprocessor systems that were then being introduced to the market. It was decided to base SSI around a second-sourced microprocessor that was a widely used industrial standard at that time, and was amply supported with software development aids. A key target for the development of SSI was to achieve a cost saving of 15 percent in comparison to traditional relay interlocks. Another key objective was to avoid any changes to the view of the signalling system to both operators and drivers alike.

Development of SSI was delivered under a tripartite agreement between British Rail, GEC General Signal, and Westinghouse Signals. The BR team were responsible for much of the work behind the design and development of both the hardware and software, including the scheme design language, data transmission system, trackside interfaces, safety validation, and overall project management; GEC and Westinghouse's principal task was to produce the fully-engineering production equipment. The majority of the interlocking software was written by a single individual. Achieving appropriate production standardisation and approval for general use proved to be a time-consuming process.

During the 1990s, various upgrades and improvements to SSI were mooted. However, these ambitions were heavily disrupted by the privatisation of British Rail and the dismantling of BR's research division. The short-lived privately-owned infrastructure company Railtrack was alleged to have been unsupportive of further SSI deployments, opting to favour computer-based interlocking (CBI) systems for its major signal renewals instead. During the 21st century, several third party companies have developed and offered their own enhancements to SSI; these have included new graphical user interfaces, diagnostic tools, safety verification technologies and expanded compatibility with fibreoptic links.
