= British Rail Class 140 =

British diesel multiple unit prototype (1981–c.1986)

British Rail Class 140 Pacer
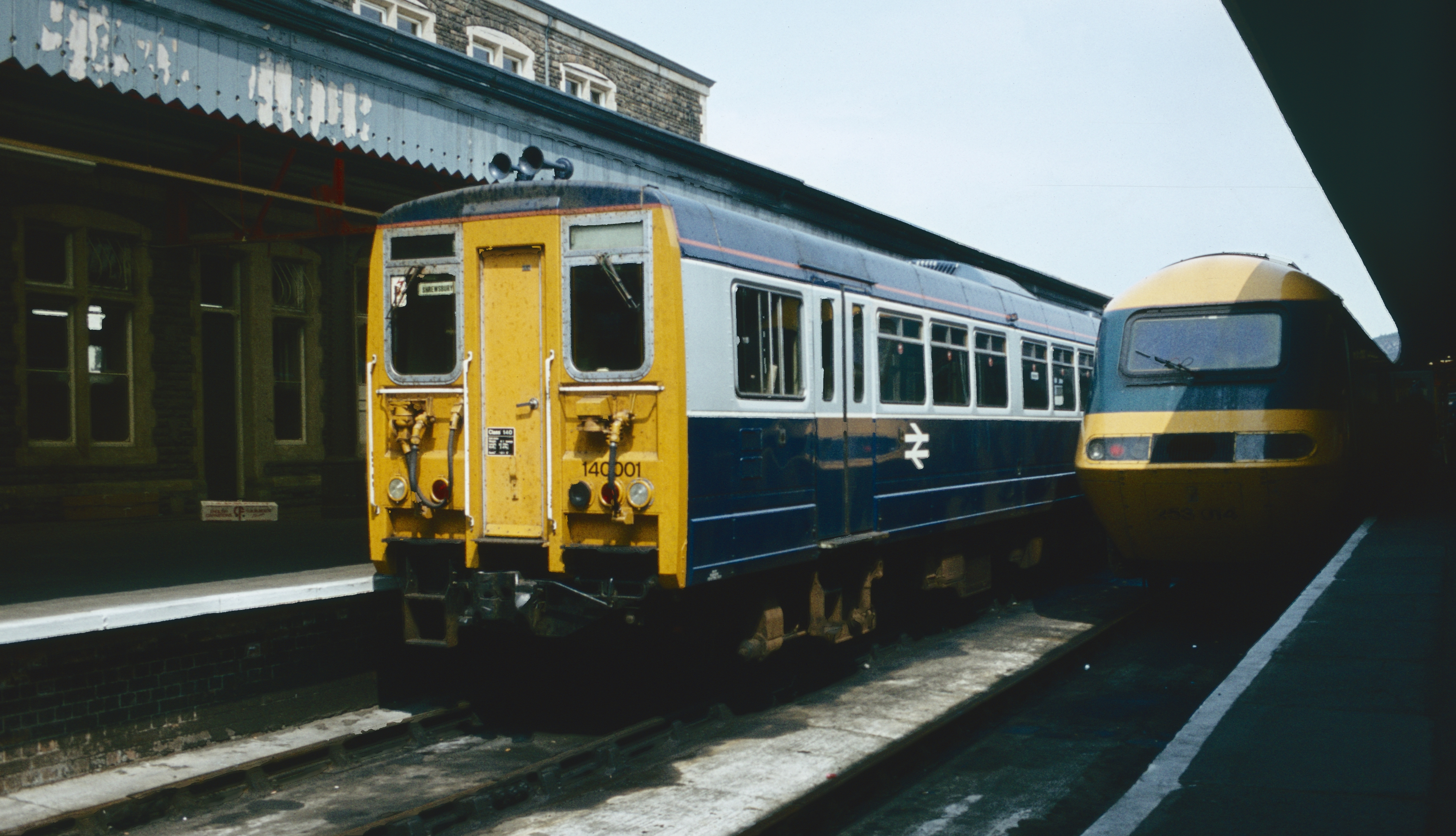
- The Class 140 (centre) at Swansea railway station (1980)
- In service: 1981 – c. 1986
- Manufacturers: British Rail Engineering Limited, Leyland Vehicles Limited
- Order no.: 30962
- Built at: Derby Litchurch Lane Works
- Family name: Pacer
- Constructed: 1979–1981
- Number built: 1
- Number preserved: 1
- Formation: 2 vehicles: DMSL-DMS
- Diagram: DMSL vehicle: DP222, DMS vehicle: DP223
- Fleet numbers: Unit: 140001, Vehicles: 55500 and 55501
- Capacity: 102 seats
- Operator: British Rail
- Depot: Neville Hill (Leeds)

Specifications
- Car body construction: Steel
- Car length: 15.878 m (52 ft 1.1 in)
- Width: Over body: 2.468 m (8 ft 1.2 in); Over treadplates: 2.744 m (9 ft 0 in)
- Height: 3.906 m (12 ft 9.8 in)
- Floor height: 1.215 m (3 ft 11.8 in)
- Doors: 3 per side
- Wheel diameter: 840 mm (2 ft 9 in)
- Wheelbase: 9.000 m (29 ft 6.3 in)
- Maximum speed: 75 mph (121 km/h)
- Weight: DMSL vehicle: 23.2 t (22.8 long tons; 25.6 short tons), DMS vehicle: 23.0 t (22.6 long tons; 25.4 short tons)
- Prime mover: 2 × Leyland TL11 (one per vehicle)
- Engine type: Inline-6 4-stroke turbo-diesel
- Displacement: 11.1 L (680 cu in) per engine
- Power output: 153 kW (205 hp) per engine
- Transmission: SCG R.500 (4-sp. epicyclic)
- Minimum turning radius: 70 m (230 ft)
- Braking systems: Electro-pneumatic (tread) ('Westcode')
- Safety system: AWS
- Coupling system: Tightlock
- Multiple working: Not fitted
- Track gauge: 1,435 mm (4 ft 8 1/2 in) standard gauge

The British Rail Class 140 was the prototype of the Pacer diesel multiple unit (DMU). It was constructed between 1979 and 1981, in response to a desire within British Rail (BR) to develop a capable railbus for its smaller branch line services. Much of the bodywork was constructed using Leyland National bus components, with the exception of the cabs. Based on the single car railbus prototypes, the Class 140 was built to BR's then stringent regulations regarding crashworthiness and resistance to end loading; as such, much of its intention lightweight 'bus on a wagon' look was lost, becoming a more substantial vehicle. Throughout the 1980s, the sole member of the class functioned as a trials and demonstration unit, acting as a herald to the closely related Class 141. Since its withdrawal, the unit has been preserved at the Keith and Dufftown Railway, in Moray, Scotland.

== Background ==
By the beginning of the 1980s, BR operated a large fleet of first generation DMUs, which had been constructed in prior decades to various designs. While formulating its long-term strategy for this sector of its operations, BR planners recognised that there would be considerable costs incurred by undertaking refurbishment programmes necessary for the continued use of these aging multiple units, particularly due to the necessity of handling and removing hazardous materials, such as asbestos. In light of the high costs involved in retention, planners examined the prospects for the development and introduction of a new generation of DMUs to succeed the first generation.

In the concept stage, two separate approaches were devised, one involving a so-called railbus that prioritised the minimisation of both initial (procurement) and ongoing (maintenance and operational) costs, while the second was a more substantial DMU that could deliver superior performance than the existing fleet, particularly when it came to long-distance services. While the more ambitious latter requirement would ultimately lead to the development of the Class 151 and the wider Sprinter group of DMUs, BR officials recognised that a cheaper unit was desirable for service on the smaller branch lines that would not be unduly impacted by lower performance specs or a high density configuration. As such, work to progress both approaches was undertaken by BR's research department during the early 1980s.

One early railbus concept, designated R3, featured a design where the body was flexibly mounted on a structural underframe which provided all of the strength required, leaving no longitudinal load-bearing role for the body. Being built as an initial prototype, it was determined that while this design was workable and had delivered some positive attributes, such as a favourable level of isolation to both noise and vibration, it also incurred a considerably high weight cost. Furthermore, it became apparent that the relatively deep underframe restricted maintenance access to the engine and transmission. Hoping to improve on the implementation, planners continued to experiment with the railbus.

In parallel with the R3 prototype, it was decided to construct a single two-car unit, designated as the Class 140, as an alternative testbed. Construction of this unit took place between 1979 and 1981.

== Design ==
The principal difference between the Class 140 and the preceding R3 concept was the incorporation of the underframe structure into the body above, thus making the latter a load-bearing structure. Other changes included the strengthening of the cant rail area and the use of standard BR multiple unit ends, enabling compliance with full Union Internationale des Chemins de fer (UIC) end load specifications for multiple units. The suspension remained unchanged, while both the Westcode electro-pneumatic brake system and brake blocks were incorporated. Internally, a mixture of standard railway multiple unit seating and bus seating was installed. The resulting railbus was relatively lightweight, as had been desired by BR's concept.

The original traction power train of the Class 140 consisted of a Leyland TL11 200 hp (150 kW) engine, a Self-Changing Gears mechanical automatic gearbox and a Gmeinder final drive unit on each car driving only a single axle. This propulsion arrangement was in part taken from the Leyland National bus. The controller for the automatic transmission was observed by BR engineers to the cause of numerous operating failures and other reliability issues; this was allegedly due to defective relay logic and poor earthing; the issue was eventually resolved on the subsequent Class 141 via the relay's replacement by a microprocessor-based controller.

The Class 140 formed the basis of the design of the production Pacer sets of Class 141] introduced in 1984, and Class 142, introduced in 1985. These subsequent production classes diverge from the design of the Class 140 in numerous places, however; one example is the separation between the underframe and the body above by a flexible mounting, a reduction in the depth of the underframe for maintenance accessibility and the use of road bus-standard electrical equipment, passenger fittings and general cab layout.

== Operations ==
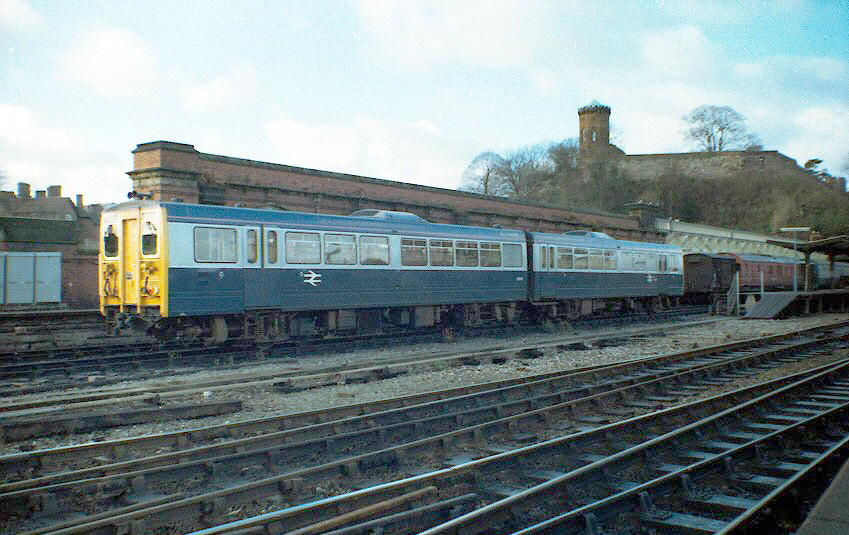
140001 at Shrewsbury between driver training runs on the Central Wales line in 1981.

During June 1981, the Class 140 testbed received a relatively high-profile launch covered by the national press. Initial testing with the Class 140 uncovered an issue with its detectability by track circuits, this was reliable resolved by swapping the material of the brake blocks from a composite to iron. Two less easily addressable drawbacks were the high level of noise generated during transit, particularly on older jointed rails, which was a consequence of the railbus's direct connection between the underframe and suspension with the body that transmitted impact forces across the body. It was also observed that the inclusion of strengthening members in the mass-produced bus body added significantly to the overall production cost, which eliminated much of the cost advantage that was the primarily goal of the type.

During its trial period, the Class 140 toured various lines across the UK. It later functioned as a demonstration unit for the incoming fleet based on the type, the Class 141. By 1985, the unit was in use as a driver training vehicle. From September 1986, the set was allocated to Neville Hill. By 1994, prior to being sold, the unit was kept at Neville Hill depot as a parts donor.

== Preservation ==
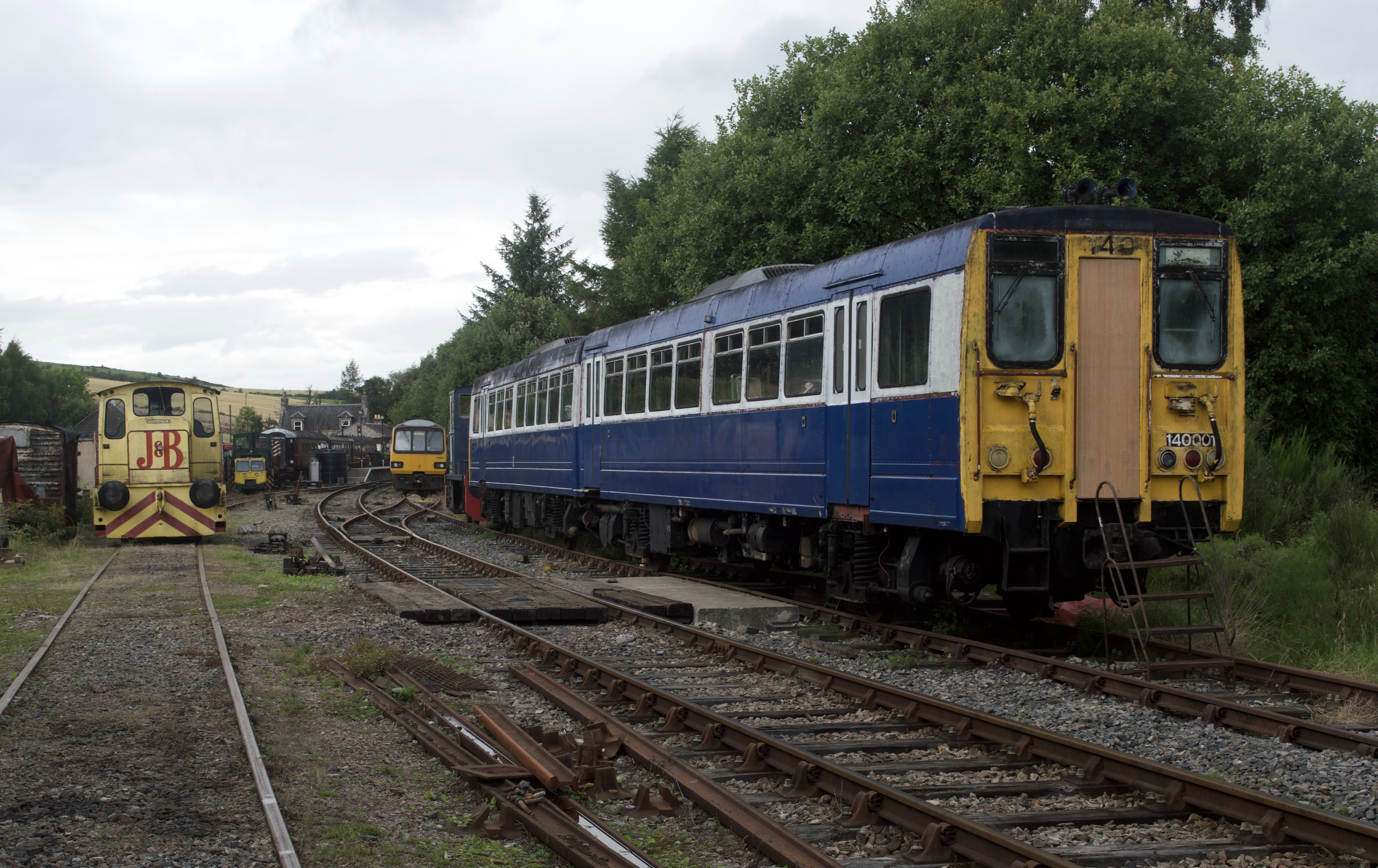
The Class 140 at Dufftown in 2021

The unit was purchased for preservation and collected from Leeds in February 1995. The sole member of the class, 140001, formed of cars 55500+55501, has been preserved and is at the Keith and Dufftown Railway. This unit is at Dufftown station. It is being restored to its former state by volunteers at the railway.
