= Railway Technical Centre =

Headquarters of British Railways Board

Coordinates: 52°54′35″N 1°27′22″W

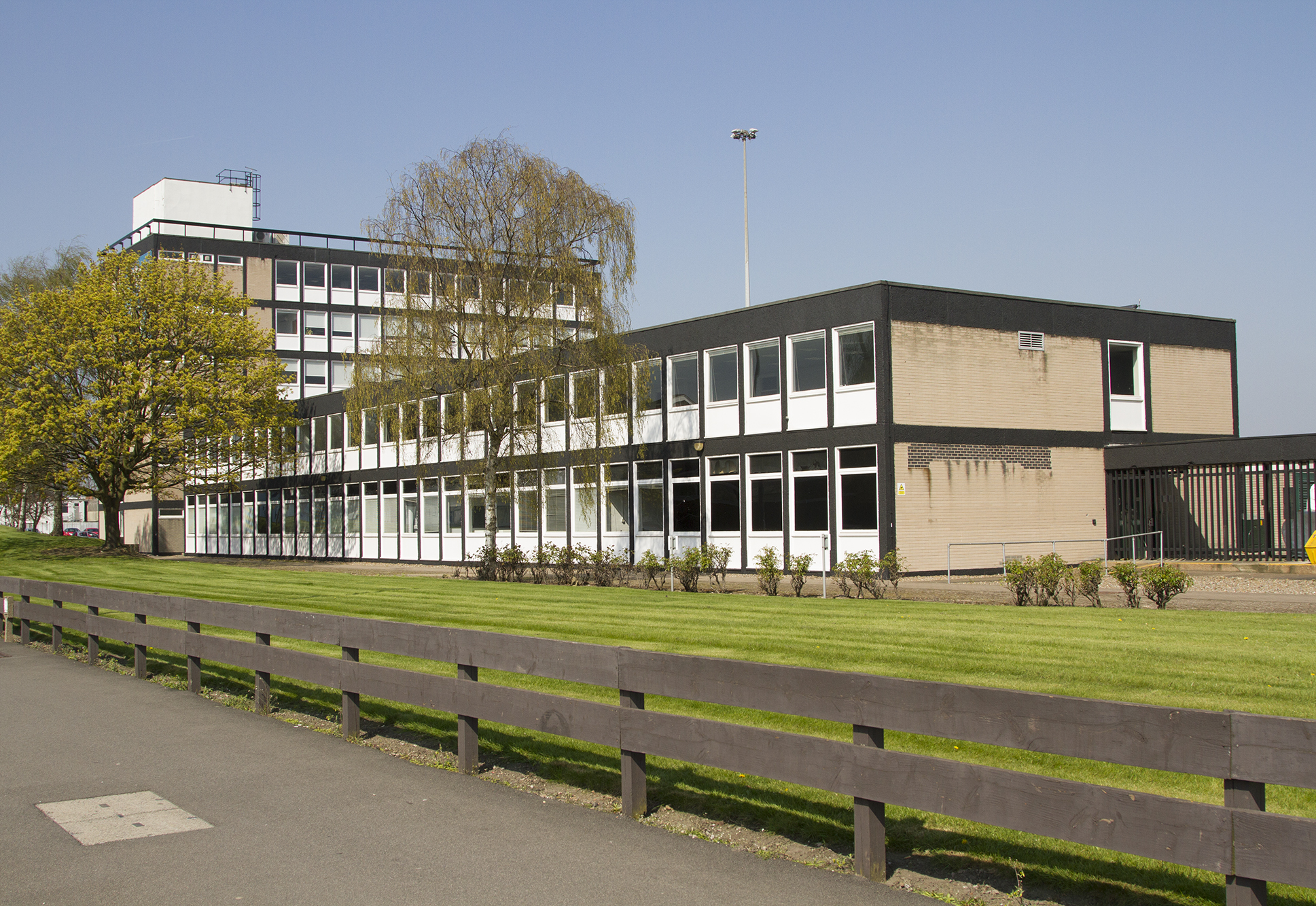
The Railway Technical Centre in 2017

The Railway Technical Centre (RTC) in London Road, Derby, England, was the technical headquarters of the British Railways Board and was built in the early 1960s. British Rail described it as the largest railway research complex in the world.

The RTC centralised most of the technical services provided by the regional Chief Mechanical & Electrical Engineers (CM&EE) to form the Department of Mechanical & Electrical Engineering (DM&EE). In addition, it housed the newly formed British Rail Research Division which reported directly to the Board. The latter is well known for its work on the experimental Advanced Passenger Train (APT-E). At that early stage this was a concept vehicle, and in time the DM&EE applied the new knowledge to existing practice in the design of the High Speed Train (HST), the later prototype APT-P and other high-speed vehicles.

== History ==
=== Opening ===
The Research Division was the first to move into the purpose-built accommodation on London Road. This was formed initially with personnel from other departments around the country, including the Electrical Research Division from Rugby, the Mechanical Engineers Research Section, the Civil Engineering Research Unit (Track Lab), and the Chemical Research Unit, while the Scientific Services Division occupied the former LMS Scientific Research Laboratory building across the road known as Hartley House. The embryo RTC site (mainly Kelvin House and the Research Test Hall) was officially opened by Prince Philip, Duke of Edinburgh in May 1964. Later additional buildings were added: Trent House and Derwent House, the Advanced Projects lab, then Stephenson House, Lathkill House and finally Brunel House.

=== Department of Mechanical & Electrical Engineering ===
In addition to the research employees, the RTC became the headquarters of the DM&EE. This brought together engineers from the regional departments, together with its Drawing Offices, the Testing & Performance Section and the Engineering Development Unit workshop (EDU) from Darlington, the Workshops Division (which later became British Rail Engineering Limited) and it was also home to the Board's Central Purchasing Department. Strange to relate but the layout of equipment within the new workshop was as near as possible the same as the original. Following this came the Plastics Development Unit from Eastleigh, which, among other innovations, was responsible for the design of the High Speed Train's streamlined cabs as well as the prototype Mark 3 coach doors.

=== Test tracks ===
When research and testing required stretches of real railway line, the Research Division used the Old Dalby Test Track, and at Mickleover in Derby.

== RTC today ==
At privatisation, most of the facilities were taken over by commercial railway engineering companies, and it was marketed as the "rtc Business Park" renting space to a range of small consultancy firms.

The only facility which is still used for railway research is the moving-model aerodynamic test facility.

The former RTC site is used by Loram to carry out repairs and maintenance on railway vehicles. It was also used by Rampart Carriage & Wagon Services (RC&WS) which went into liquidation in 2013. A large part of the site is used as storage and an operating base by Loram and Network Rail, whose rolling stock on site forms part of Network Rail testing trains. Usual traction on these trains is either Colas Rail class 37s and Loram C21 Grinding/Rail Profile Trains are also maintained at this facility.

LCR (London and Continental Railways) took over the site in 2013.

== General references ==
- British Railway Research 1864-1965 by S.Wise, C.Eng., F.I.Mech.E., M.I.M. (Edited by A.O.Gilchrist and with a biographical note by E.S.Burdon)
