= British Rail Class 143 =

British class of diesel multiple unit trains

Class 143 Pacer
- A GWR Class 143 at Exeter Central station in 2018

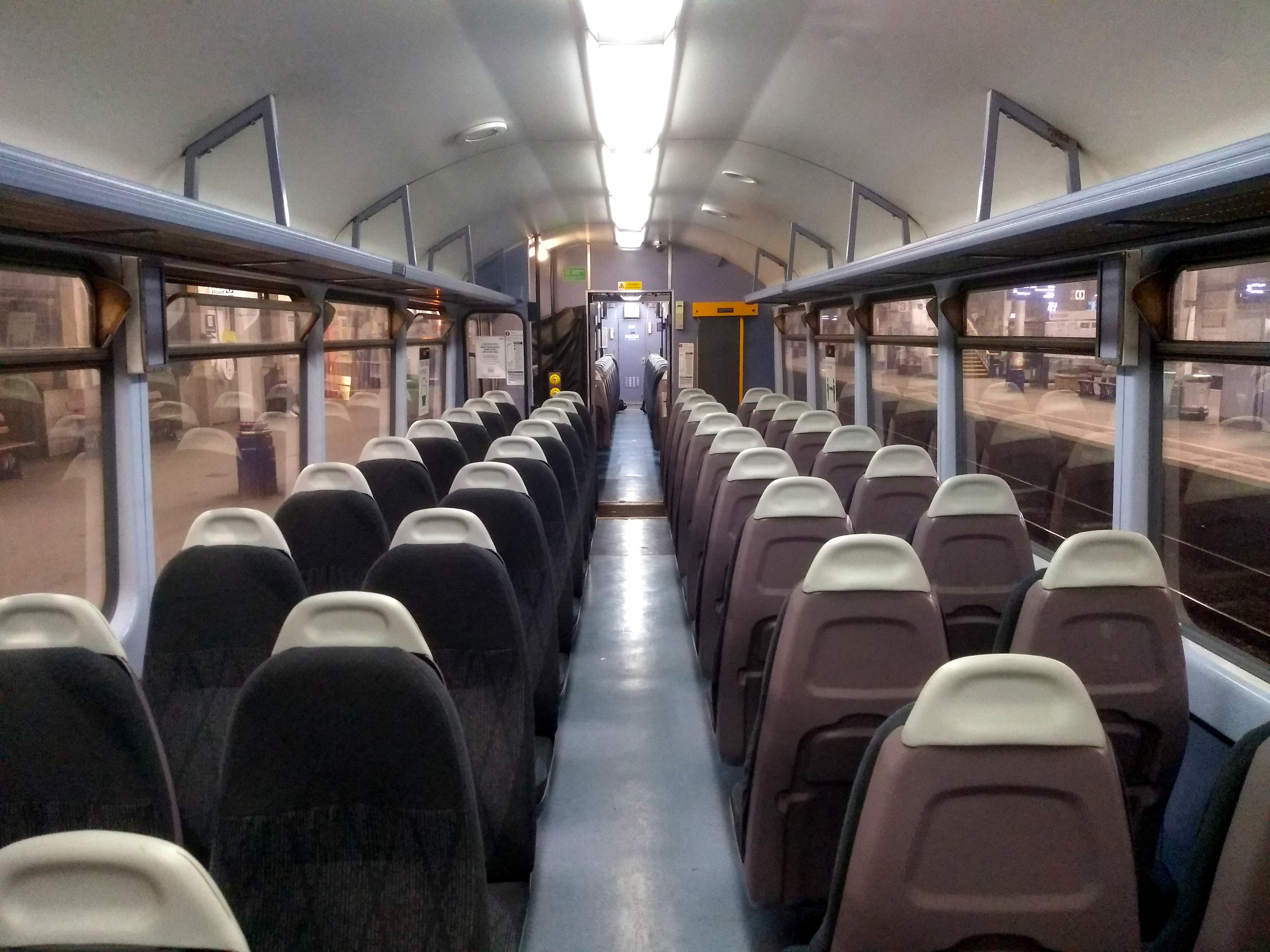
- Great Western Railway refurbished saloon
- In service: 1985–2021
- Manufacturers: Hunslet-Barclay, Walter Alexander Coachbuilders
- Order nos.: 31005 (DMS vehicles), 31006 (DMSL vehicles)
- Family name: Pacer
- Replaced: BR first-generation DMUs
- Constructed: 1985–1986
- Refurbished: 1990s; 2001–2002; 2015–2016
- Number built: 25
- Number preserved: 13
- Number scrapped: 12
- Formation: Two cars per unit: DMS-DMSL
- Diagram: DMS vehicles: DP236, DMSL vehicles: DP237
- Fleet numbers: As built: 143001–143025, Later: 143601–143625
- Capacity: In 4-abreast config.: 104 seats; In 5-abreast config.: 122 seats

Specifications
- Car body construction: Steel underframe, aluminium alloy body and roof
- Car length: 15.546 m (51 ft 0 in) (over couplers)
- Width: 2.695 m (8 ft 10.1 in)
- Height: 3.515 m (11 ft 6.4 in)
- Doors: Double-leaf folding (three per side)
- Wheelbase: 9.000 m (29 ft 6.3 in)
- Maximum speed: 75 mph (121 km/h)
- Weight: DMS vehs.: 24.0 t (23.6 long tons; 26.5 short tons); DMSL vehs.: 24.5 t (24.1 long tons; 27.0 short tons)
- Axle load: Route Availability 1
- Prime movers: As built: 2 × Leyland TL11, After upgrade: 2 × Cummins LTA10-R; (one per vehicle)
- Engine type: Inline-6 4-stroke turbo-diesel
- Displacement: Leyland: 11.1 L (680 cu in), Cummins: 10.0 L (610 cu in); (per engine)
- Power output: Leyland: 149 kW (200 hp); Cummins: 168 kW (225 hp); (per engine)
- Transmission: As built: SCG RRE5 (4-sp. epicyclic); After upgrade: Voith T 211 r (hydrokinetic)
- Minimum turning radius: 70 m (230 ft)
- Braking system: Electro-pneumatic (tread)
- Safety systems: AWS, TPWS
- Coupling system: BSI
- Multiple working: Within class and with Classes 14x, 15x and 170
- Track gauge: 1,435 mm (4 ft 8 1/2 in) standard gauge

Notes/references
- Specifications as at March 1985 except where otherwise noted.

British Rail Class 143 Pacer diesel multiple unit passenger trains were introduced between 1985 and 1986.

During the 1980s, British Rail (BR) was interested in replacing its first-generation diesel multiple units, particularly in the use of railbuses to service its lightly used branch lines. It was decided to develop such a vehicle with a high level of commonality with the widely used Leyland National bus, leading to its modular design serving as the basis for the design. Several single- and two-car prototypes were constructed and evaluated, leading to an initial production batch by British Leyland, designated Class 141 units. BR, seeking to procure improved derivatives, placed an order with the manufacturers Hunslet-Barclay and Walter Alexander to construct its own variant, the Class 143.

Entering operational service during the mid-1980s, the Class 143 embodied several advances over the original model in terms of ride quality and reliability. During its operating lives, the type operated various passenger services across the United Kingdom; initially operated in the North-East of England, all units were transferred subsequently to other regions, including Wales and South-West England.

Due to their non-compliance with the Rail Vehicle Accessibility (Interoperable Rail System) Regulations 2008, the Pacers began to be withdrawn during the late 2010s ahead of the 1 January 2020 deadline. Some fleets were given dispensation to operate until 31 December 2020. While modifications for compliance were proposed by rolling-stock companies, no train operator took up the option. Great Western Railway retired its Class 143 fleet in December 2020, while Transport for Wales was granted an extension and ran its trains until 29 May 2021.

== Background ==
By the beginning of the 1980s, BR operated a large fleet of first-generation DMUs, which had been constructed in prior decades to various designs. While formulating its long-term strategy for this sector of its operations, BR planners recognised that there would be considerable costs incurred by undertaking refurbishment programmes necessary for the continued use of these aging multiple units; this was due particularly to the necessity of handling and removing hazardous materials such as asbestos. In light of the high costs involved in retention, planners examined the prospects for the development and introduction of a new generation of DMUs to succeed the first generation.

In the concept stage, two separate approaches were devised, one involving a so-called railbus that prioritised the minimisation of both initial (procurement) and ongoing (maintenance & operational) costs, while the second was a more substantial DMU that could deliver superior performance than the existing fleet, particularly when it came to long-distance services. While the more ambitious latter requirement would ultimately lead to the development of the Class 150 and the wider Sprinter group of DMUs, BR officials recognised that a cheaper unit was desirable for service on the smaller branch lines that would not be unduly impacted by lower performance specs or a high density configuration. As such, work to progress both approaches was undertaken by BR's research department during the early 1980s.

During this period, a number of prototypes were constructed to explore different designs and approaches for implementing the railbus concept. One such vehicle was a single two-car unit, designated as the Class 140, that was constructed between 1979 and 1981. This prototype was introduced with much fanfare during June 1981. Initial testing with the Class 140 uncovered several issues, such as difficulty detecting the type via track circuits; this was reliably resolved by swapping the material of the brake blocks from a composite to iron. Two less easily addressable drawbacks were the high level of noise generated during transit, particularly on older jointed rails, which was a consequence of the railbus's direct connection between the underframe and suspension with the body that transmitted impact forces across the body. It was also observed that the inclusion of strengthening members in the mass-produced bus body added significantly to the overall production cost, which eliminated much of the cost advantage that was the primarily goal of the type.

The Class 140 was viewed to be an overall success, and thus BR issued an order for an initial production model, designated Class 141, to British Leyland during 1984 with production commencing thereafter. During its early years of service, the Class 141 experienced numerous issues, particularly with the transmission and ride quality; work undertaken at BR's direct resulted in the quick development of numerous improvements to at least partially address these shortcomings. When it came to ordering more railbuses, however, it was decided that instead of placing these follow-on orders for further Class 141, it would be more desirable to procure improved derivatives. Accordingly, BR placed orders for two new Pacer models: the Class 142 and Class 143.

== Design ==
The Class 143 shared a high degree of similarity to the design of the Class 141. However, one major area of change is that both the Class 142 and Class 143 featured a noticeably wider body, instead of adhering to the width of the standard bus as per the Class 141; specifically, the width was expanded to the maximum amount permissible to remain within the loading gauge. This resulting in an increased internal area to accommodate passengers within, enabling a three-by-two seating arrangement to be installed for a total capacity of 121 seats. The increased seating was particularly useful as, in addition to their use on rural feeder services, the Class 143's use on short range urban services had been foreseen by BR planners.

Both the bodies and underframes were designed for interchangeability, as had been specified by BR. To achieve this, they were manufactured upon jigs. They had been designed so that the entire body could be replaced during a mid-life refurbishment/reconstruction, and that the replacement body would not be limited to the exact same dimensions either. The underframe area, in addition to its structural role, accommodated all of the propulsion apparatus along with the majority of electrical gear. As a cost-saving measure, the manufacturers were directly to make use of road bus-standard equipment in several areas, including passenger fittings and the general cab layout, along with other areas wherever possible. Unlike the Class 141, which featured automotive-standard wiring for the traction equipment with resulting poor performance, railway-grade wiring for the traction and braking circuits was mandated by BR for both the Class 142 and Class 143 to yield greater reliability.

As originally built, the traction arrangement of the Class 143 consisted of a Leyland TL11 200 HP engine, a Self-Changing Gears mechanical automatic gearbox and a Gmeinder final drive unit on each car driving only a single axle. This propulsion arrangement was in part taken from the Leyland National bus, as well as shared with the earlier Class 141. Unlike the Class 141, a microprocessor-based controller for the automatic transmission was used from the outset, allowing the reliability issues posed by defective relay logic and poor earthing present on the predecessor to be entirely avoided. Another improvement was the installation of auto-couplers and auto-connectors that enabled the Class 143 to work in multiple with the Class 150 Sprinter DMUs.

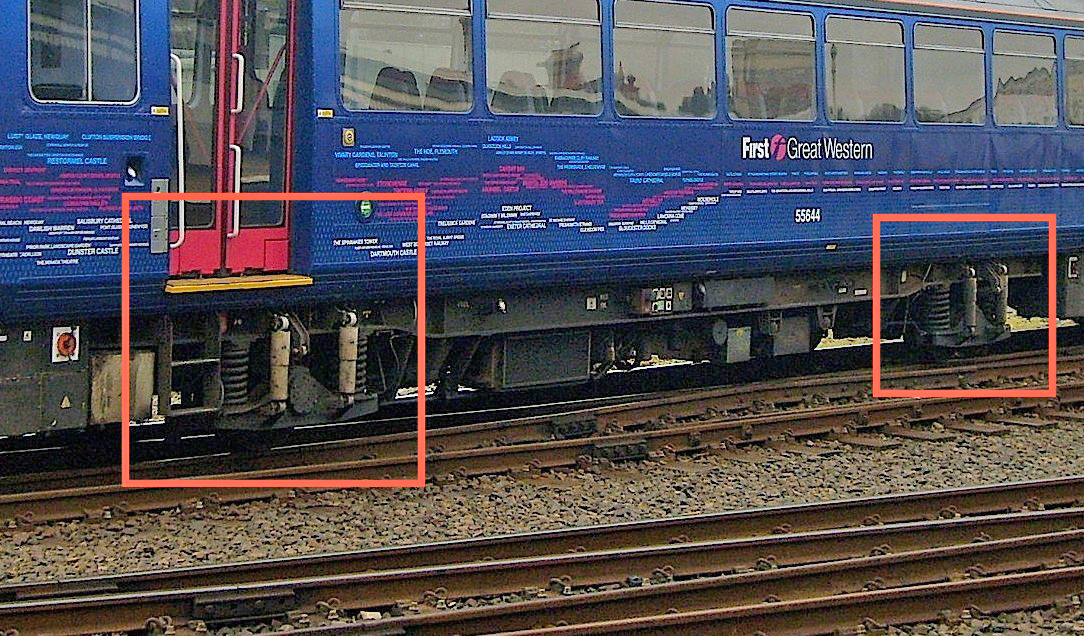
Unlike most rolling stock on the UK network, Class 143s have a single axle at each end of the vehicle (red boxes)

Both axles (one driving per coach at the inner end) were fitted directly to the chassis rather than being mounted on bogies, unlike traditional DMUs. This uncommon arrangement has been attributed with resulting in the Class 141 units possessing a relatively rough ride, especially when traversing jointed track or points. Their combatively poor ride quality has been said to be a major factor in the type's general unpopularity amongst passengers. As a positive result from BR's experiences with the Class 141, the Class 143 featured an improved suspension arrangement to enhance passenger comfort. This consisted of a wider spring base and double dampers being installed; these features had been deemed necessary by BR to provide sufficient levels of performance and had been retrofitted onto all of the older Class 141s as well.

== Operations ==
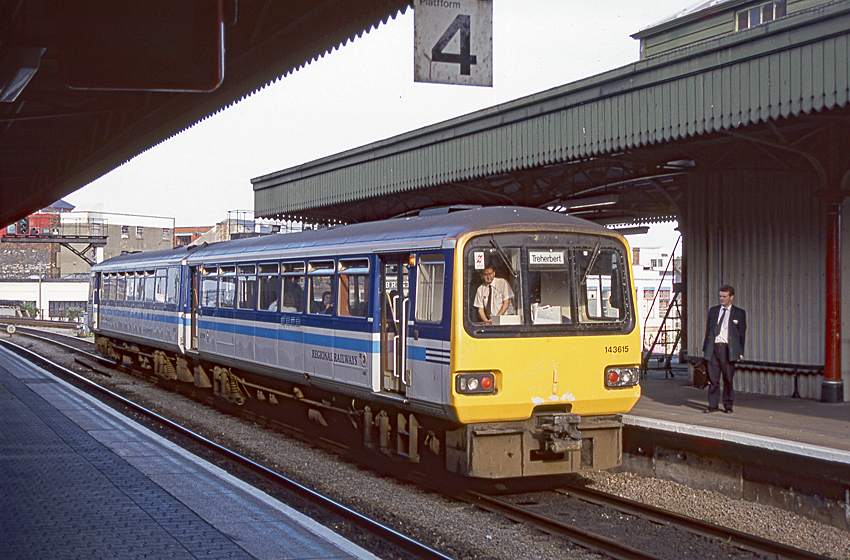
Regional Railways 143615 at Cardiff Central, 1996

During their early years, the Class 143s worked originally in the North East of England. Subsequently, the entire fleet was transferred to Wales and South West England.

The Rail Vehicle Accessibility (Interoperable Rail System) Regulations 2008 and the subsequent Persons of Reduced Mobility - Technical Specification for Interoperability (PRM-TSI) require that all public passenger trains must be accessible by 1 January 2020. As originally delivered, the Class 143 does not meet this requirement and had to be withdrawn without modifications to become compliant. During the 2010s, the rolling-stock leasing company Porterbrook proposed an extensive refurbishment of both the Class 143 and 144 units with the purpose of satisfying the diverse needs of this requirement; it was noted that the envisioned modifications would necessitate a significant reduction in the number of seats available.

Great Western Railway (GWR) was one such operator of the Class 143. Its units were mainly used on short-distance services around Exeter, but had previously been common on various services in the Bristol area as well. At one point, as part of the franchise's plans to modernise its fleet, GWR planned to withdraw its remaining eight units by December 2019 via a cascade programme that would see the type being entirely replaced with Class 150s. On 11 December 2019, the Department for Transport issued a dispensation, allowing GWR to continue to operate its Class 143 fleet up until 31 December 2020. Their fleet was withdrawn in December 2020.

Arriva Trains Wales 143625 at Cardiff Central in 2008

Transport for Wales was granted an extension until May 2021, due to delays with the introduction of Class 769s and their last trains of the class ran on 29 May 2021.

The last main line passenger service with a Pacer unit in its formation was the 22:02 Rhymney to Cardiff Central, worked by 143601 coupled to a Class 150/2 unit; this train brought an end to Pacer operation after over 35 years. Thereafter, the use of Pacer trains is confined to heritage lines.

== Incidents ==
On 17 October 2004, Wessex Trains unit 143613, forming a service from Bristol Temple Meads to Weston-super-Mare with 143621, caught fire between the site of the former Flax Bourton and Nailsea and Backwell. Fire services took two hours to get the blaze under control. Of the 23 passengers and crew, three were treated on-site for the effects of smoke inhalation. One carriage was completely burnt out and the other was badly damaged, causing the train to be written off. The line through Nailsea was closed until 03:30 the following morning, when the train was hauled to St Philip's Marsh depot for examination. The unit was later taken to Crewe Works where it was stored, then later to Cardiff Canton TMD where it was scrapped. The Rail Safety and Standards Board issued a report into the incident, concluding that the fire was caused by electrical arcing between the live starter motor cable (which had damaged insulation) and the unit's underframe, causing accumulated oily residues to ignite.

On 16 January 2020, 143603 had several windows smashed in by waves and sea debris while running along the sea wall at Dawlish during stormy weather, causing minor injuries to one passenger.

== Fleet details ==
Class	Status	Qty.	Year built	Cars per unit	Unit nos.
143	Preserved	11	1985–1986	2	143601–143603, 143606, 143612, 143616–143619, 143623, 143625
143	Scrapped	12	1985–1986	2	143604–143605, 143608–143611, 143613–143615, 143620–143621, 143624
143	Converted for off-railway use	2	1985–1986	2	143607, 143622

Vehicle number ranges were as follows:

- DMS: 55642–55666
- DMSL: 55667–55691

=== Named units ===
Some units received names:

- 143605 Crimestoppers (scrapped)
- 143609 Sir Tom Jones (scrapped)

== Preservation ==
=== Operational ===
Unit	Vehicle numbers		Livery	Location	Notes
Unit	DMS	DMSL	Livery	Location	Notes
143601	55642	55667	Arriva Trains Wales (unbranded)	Tanat Valley Light Railway	Arrived July 2021.
143602	55651	55668	Arriva Trains Wales (unbranded)	Nene Valley Railway	Arrived June 2021.
143603	55658	55669	Great Western Railway	Chasewater Railway	Operational, pending transfer to Vale of Berkeley Railway.
143606	55647	55672	Arriva Trains Wales (unbranded)	Llanelli & Mynydd Mawr Railway	Arrived 3 June 2021.
143612	55653	55678	Great Western Railway	Llanelli & Mynydd Mawr Railway	Arrived April 2022.
143616	55657	55682	Arriva Trains Wales (unbranded)	Tanat Valley Light Railway	Arrived 7 July 2021.
143617	55644	55683	Great Western Railway	Tarka Valley Railway	Arrived 16 November 2022. Named after Founder Member and Chairman Rod Garner on 8 April 2023.
143618	55659	55684	Great Western Railway	Plym Valley Railway	Donated to the Plym Valley Railway in 2022.
143619	55660	55685	Great Western Railway	Tanat Valley Light Railway	Arrived August 2022.
143623	55664	55689	Regional Railways	Wensleydale Railway	Returned to traffic in summer 2023
143625	55666	55691	Arriva Trains Wales (unbranded)	Keighley and Worth Valley Railway	Spares donor for 144011. Ran coupled to 144011 for one weekend in October 2023 at the KWVR railcar weekend

=== Non-railway use ===
Alongside the operational preserved Class 143s, some have been acquired for non-operational use at heritage railways or for non-railway use:

Unit	Vehicle numbers		Livery	Location	Notes
Unit	DMS	DMSL	Livery	Location	Notes
143607	55648	55673	Arriva Trains Wales (unbranded)	Llanelli & Mynydd Mawr Railway	Arrived 3 June 2021. To be converted for use as a ticket office, shop and café for the railway.
143622	55663	55688	Arriva Trains Wales (unbranded)	Llanelli Goods Shed	Arrived June 2021, as part of the refurbishment of the goods shed.

== Liveries ==
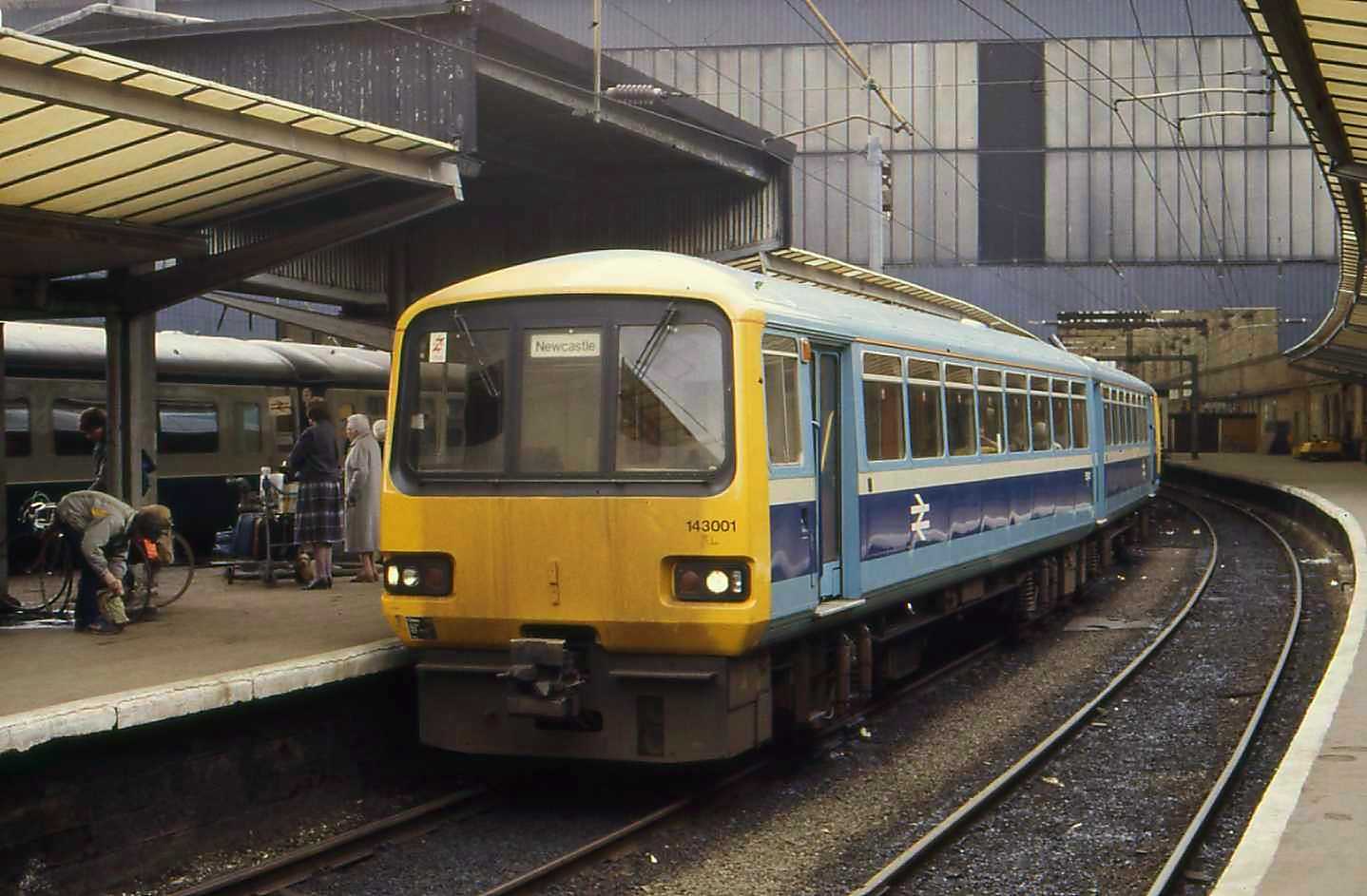
BR Regional Railways blue (Carlisle, undated)

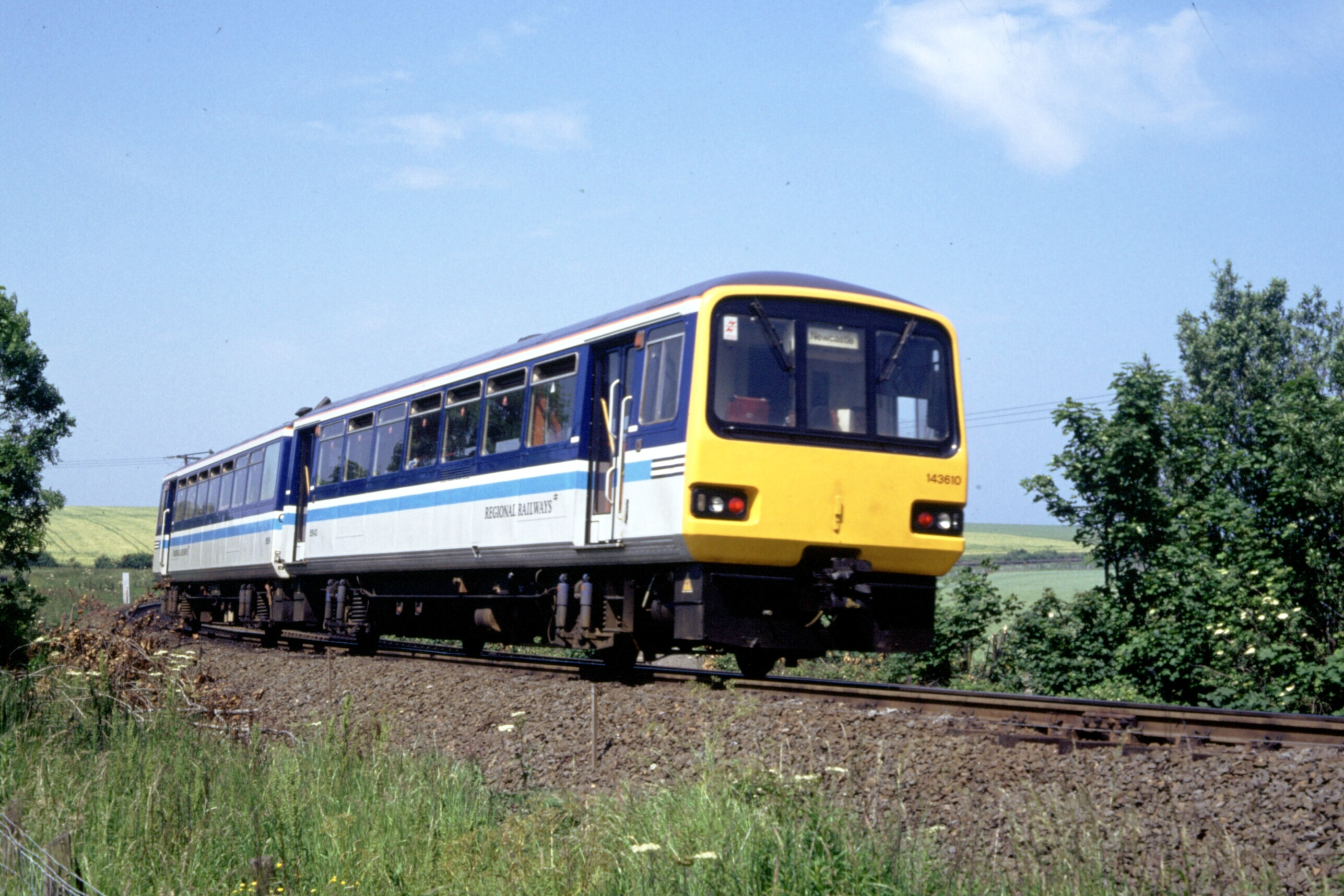
BR Regional Railways sector livery (Seaham, 1991)

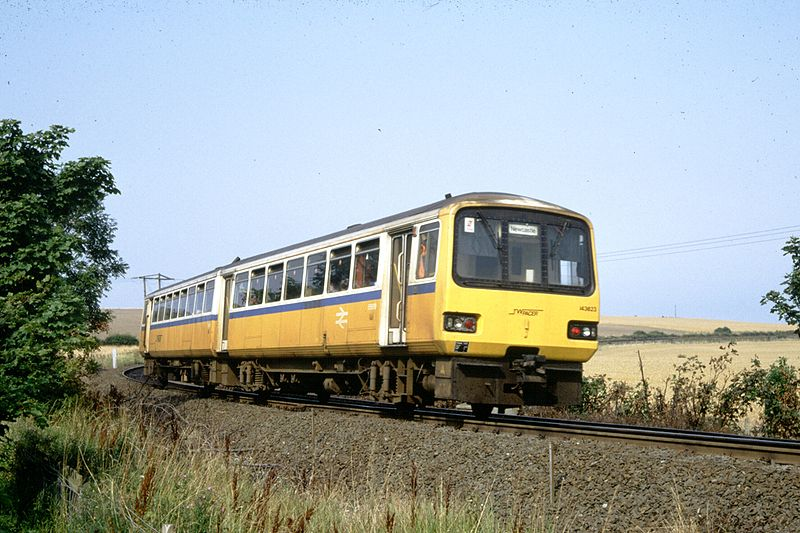
Tyne & Wear PTE livery with TW Pacer branding (Seaham, 1991)

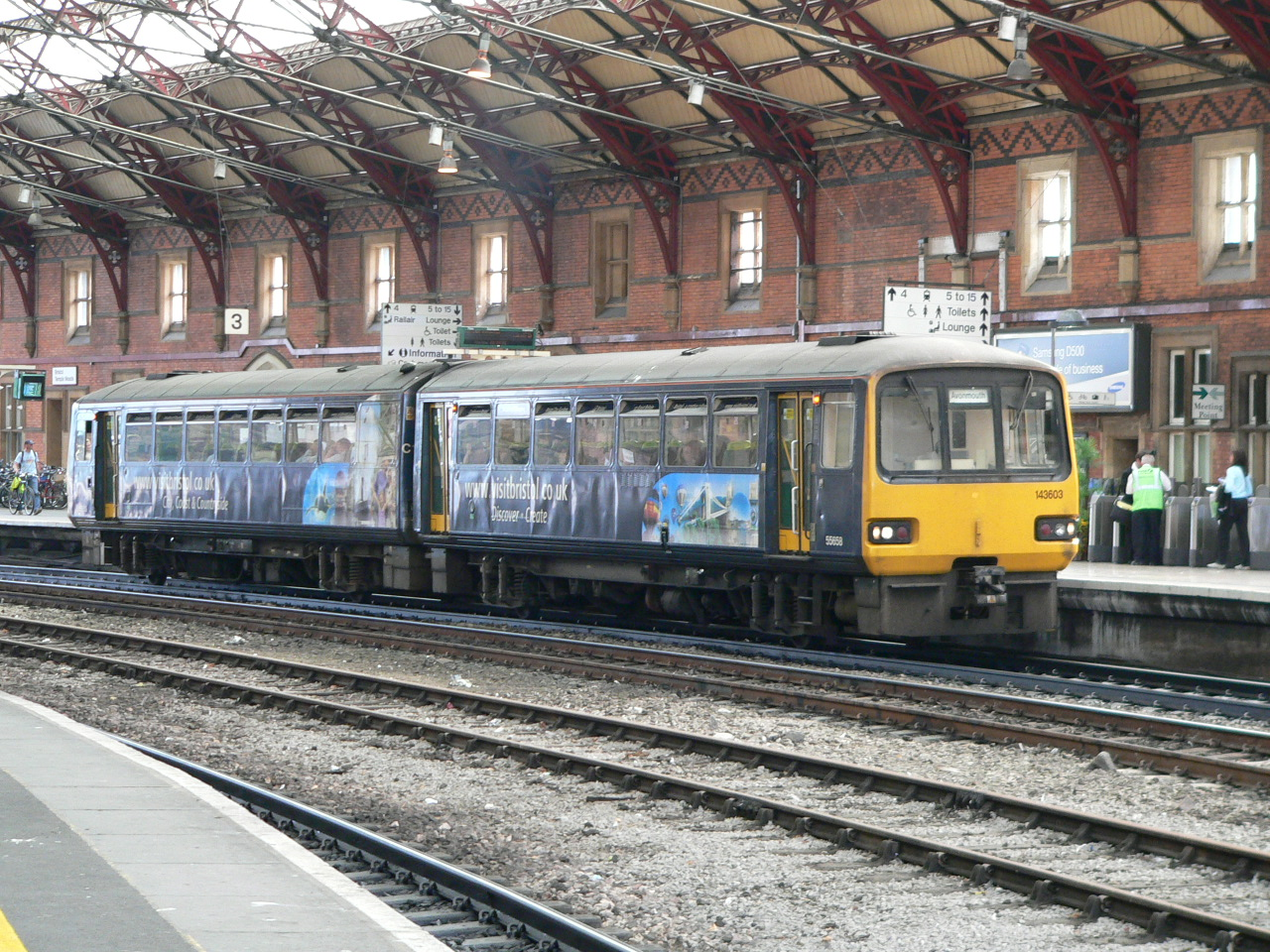
Wessex Trains 'Visit Bristol' (Bristol Temple Meads, 2005)

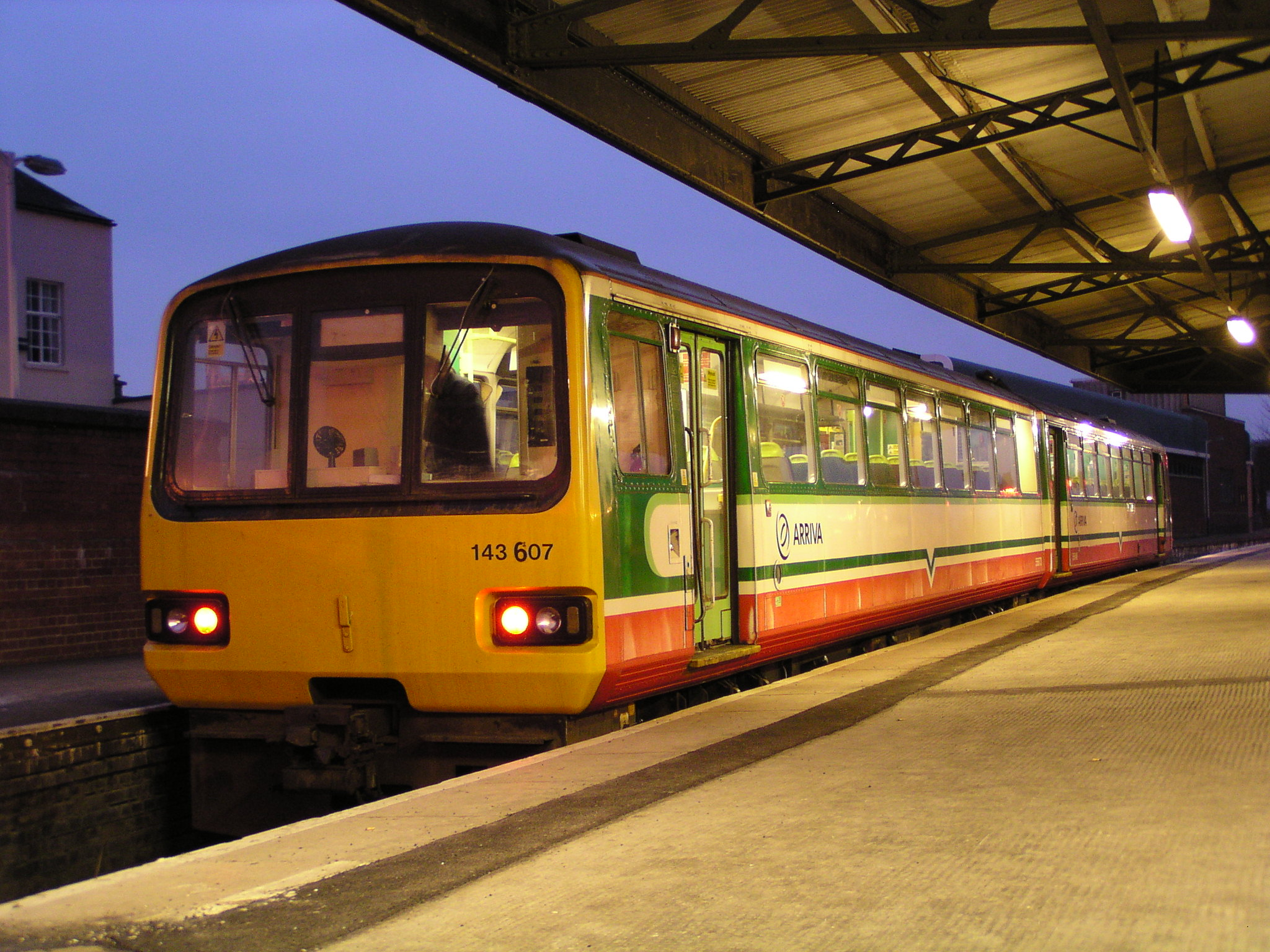
Wales and Borders 'Valley Lines' with later Arriva branding (Gloucester, 2005)

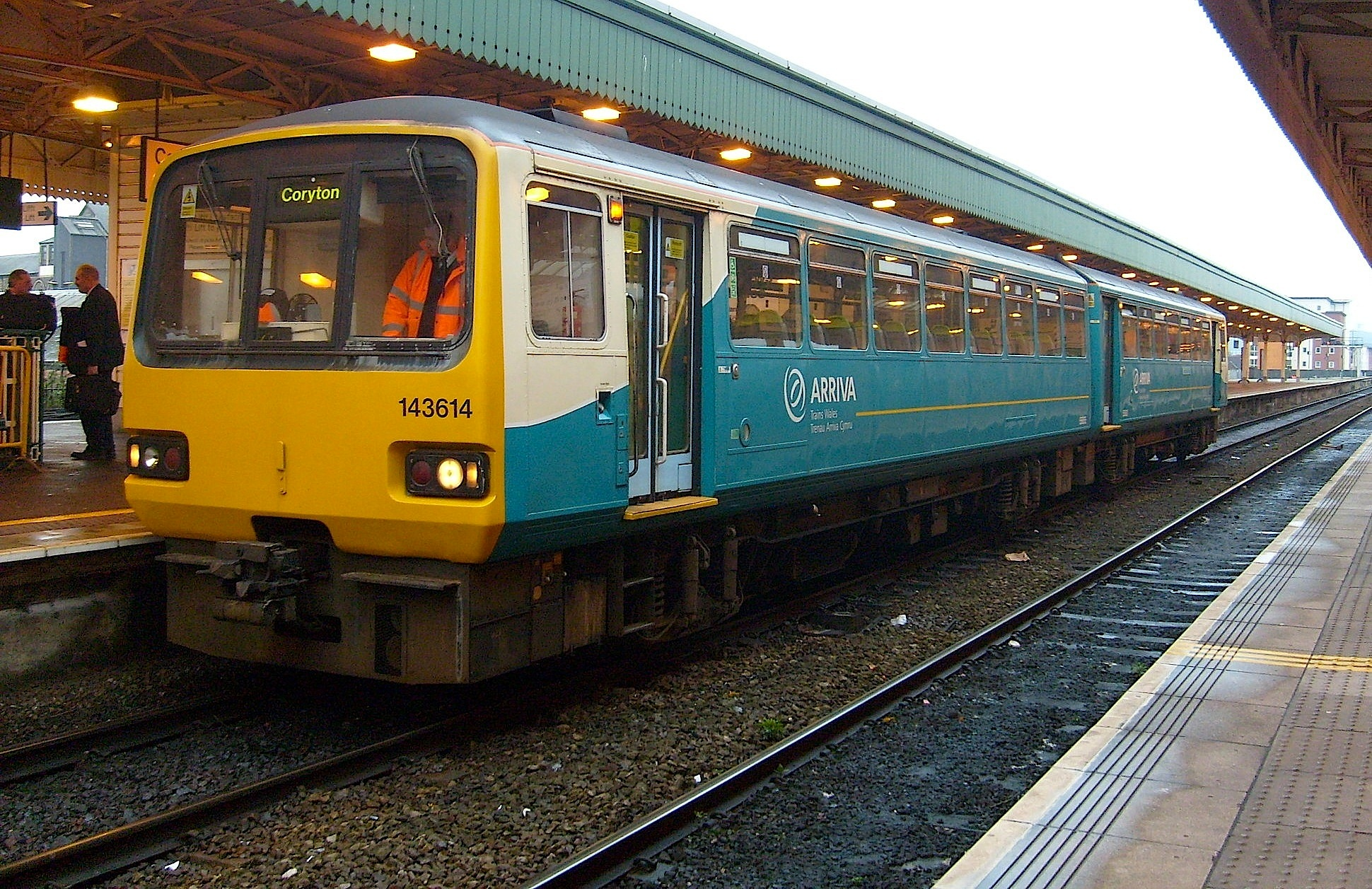
Arriva Trains Wales (Cardiff Central, 2009)

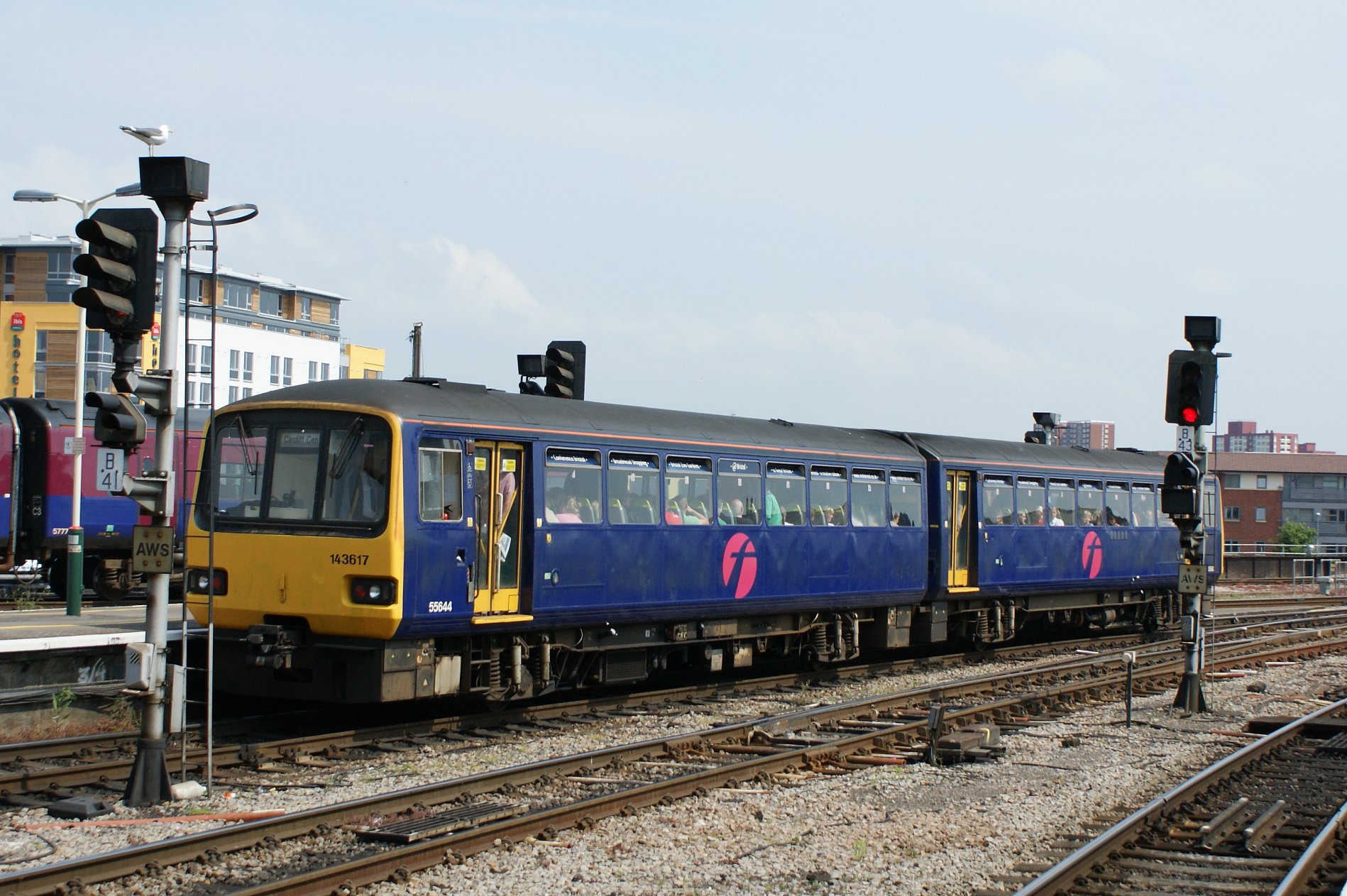
First Great Western (Bristol Temple Meads, 2008)

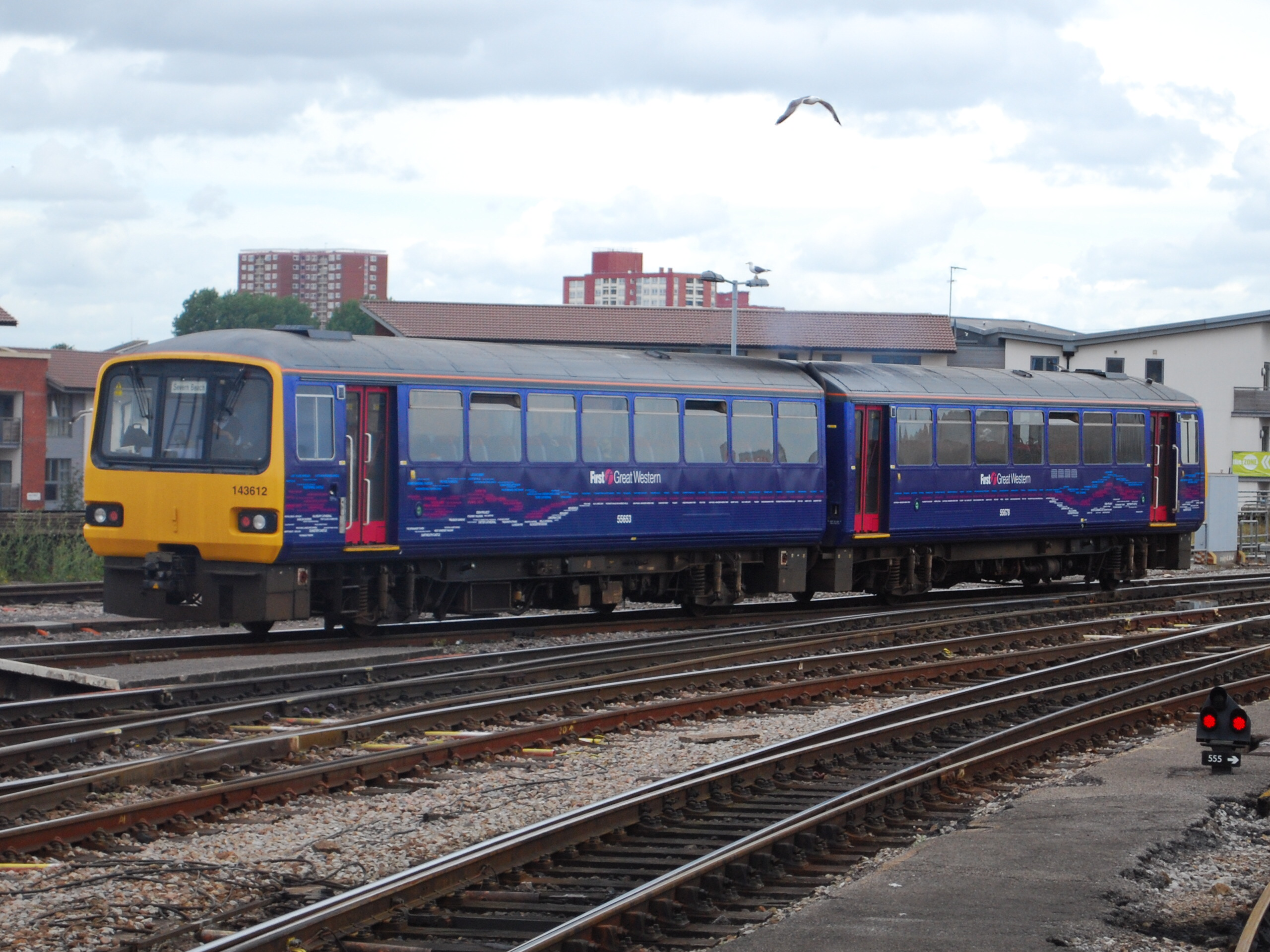
First Great Western (Bristol Temple Meads, 2009)

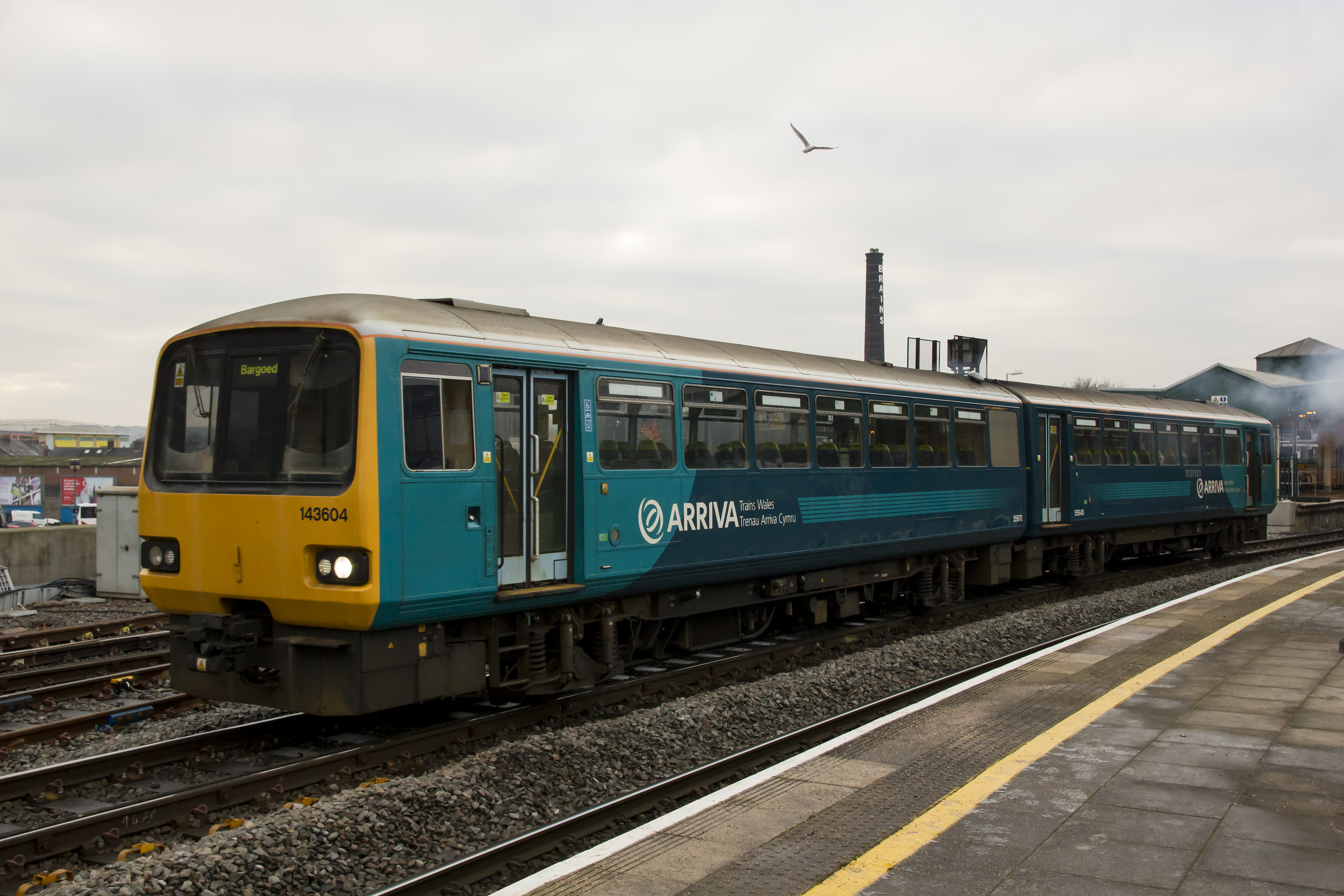
Arriva Trains Wales 'Executive' (Cardiff Central, 2016)

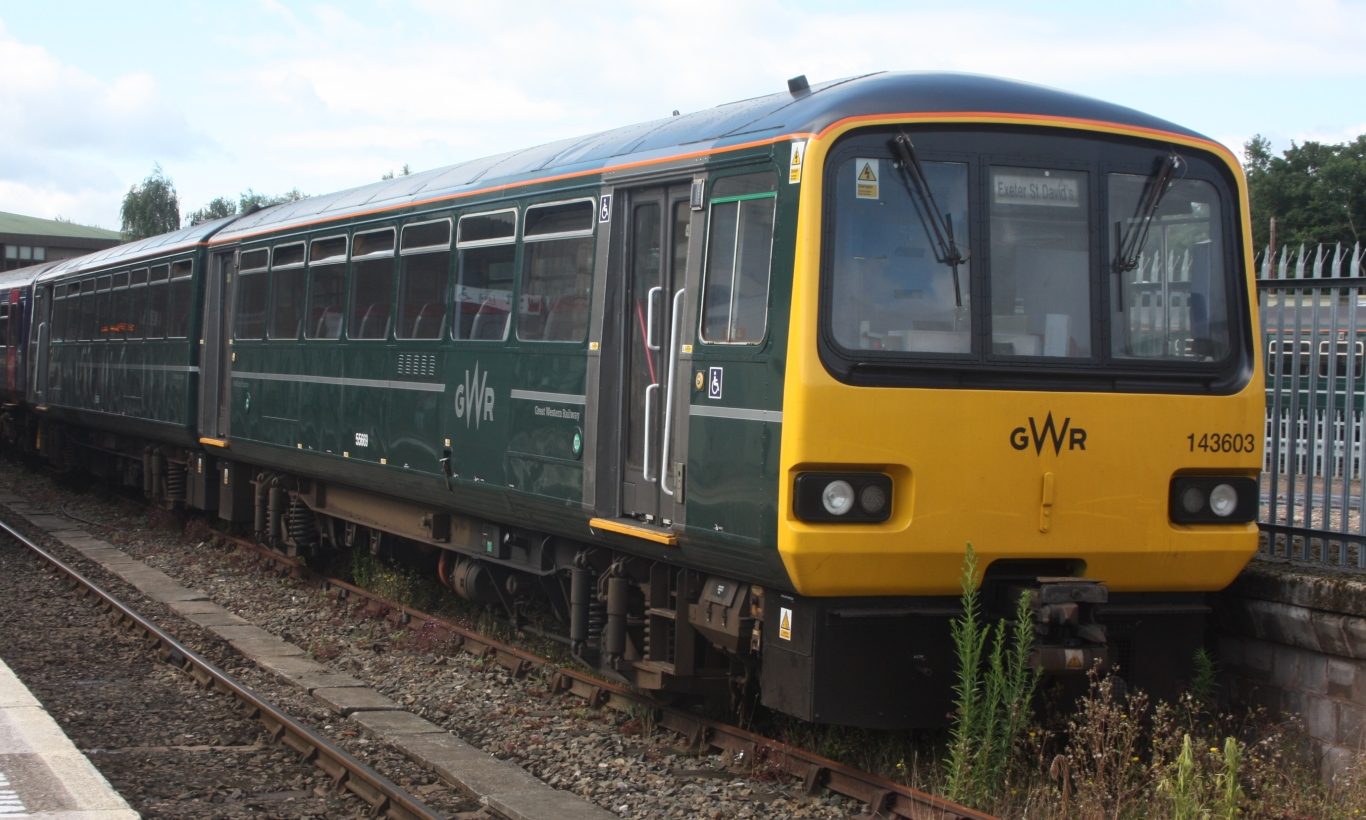
Great Western Railway (Exeter, 2017)

== Interiors ==
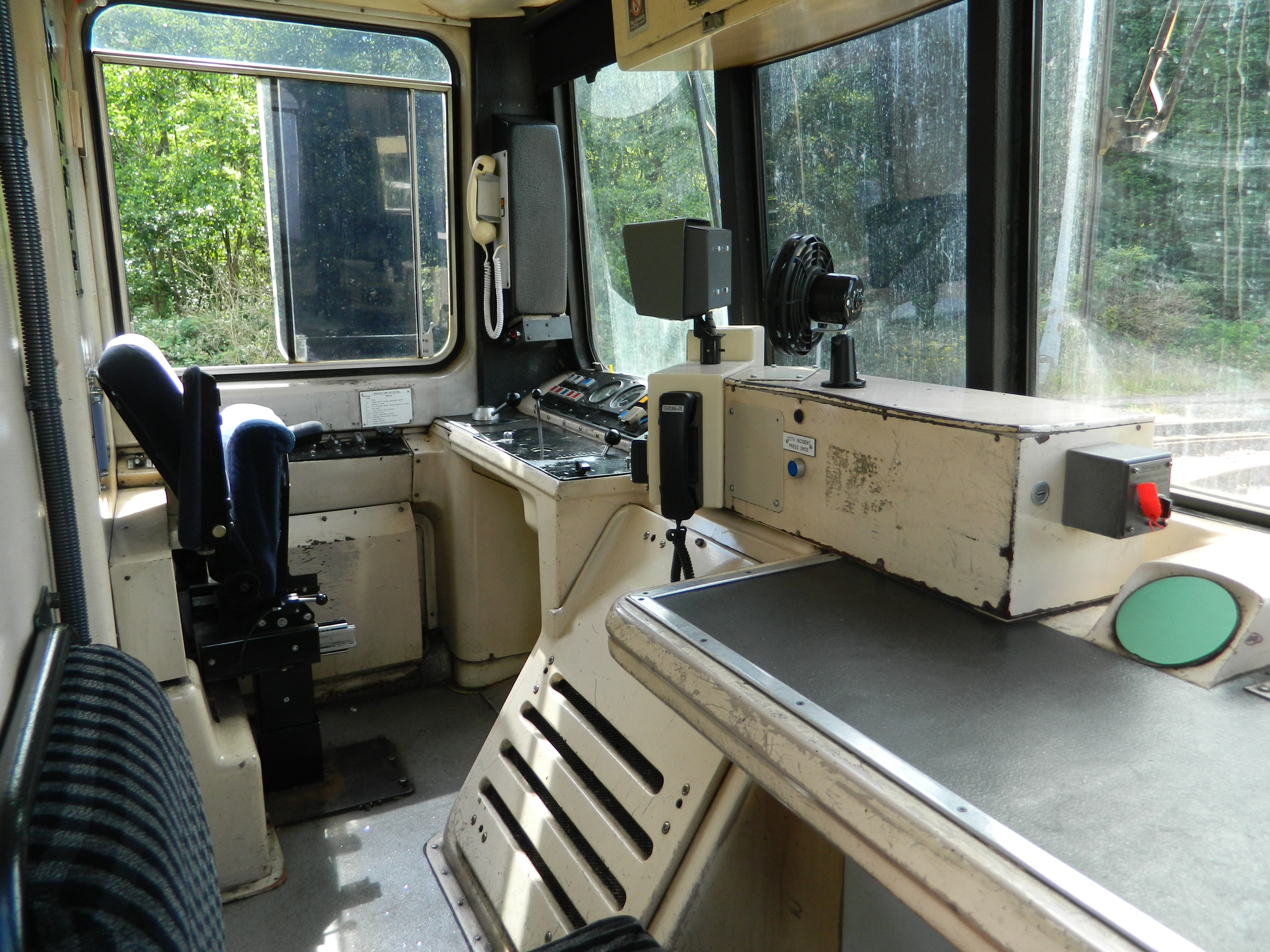
Arriva Trains Wales Cab

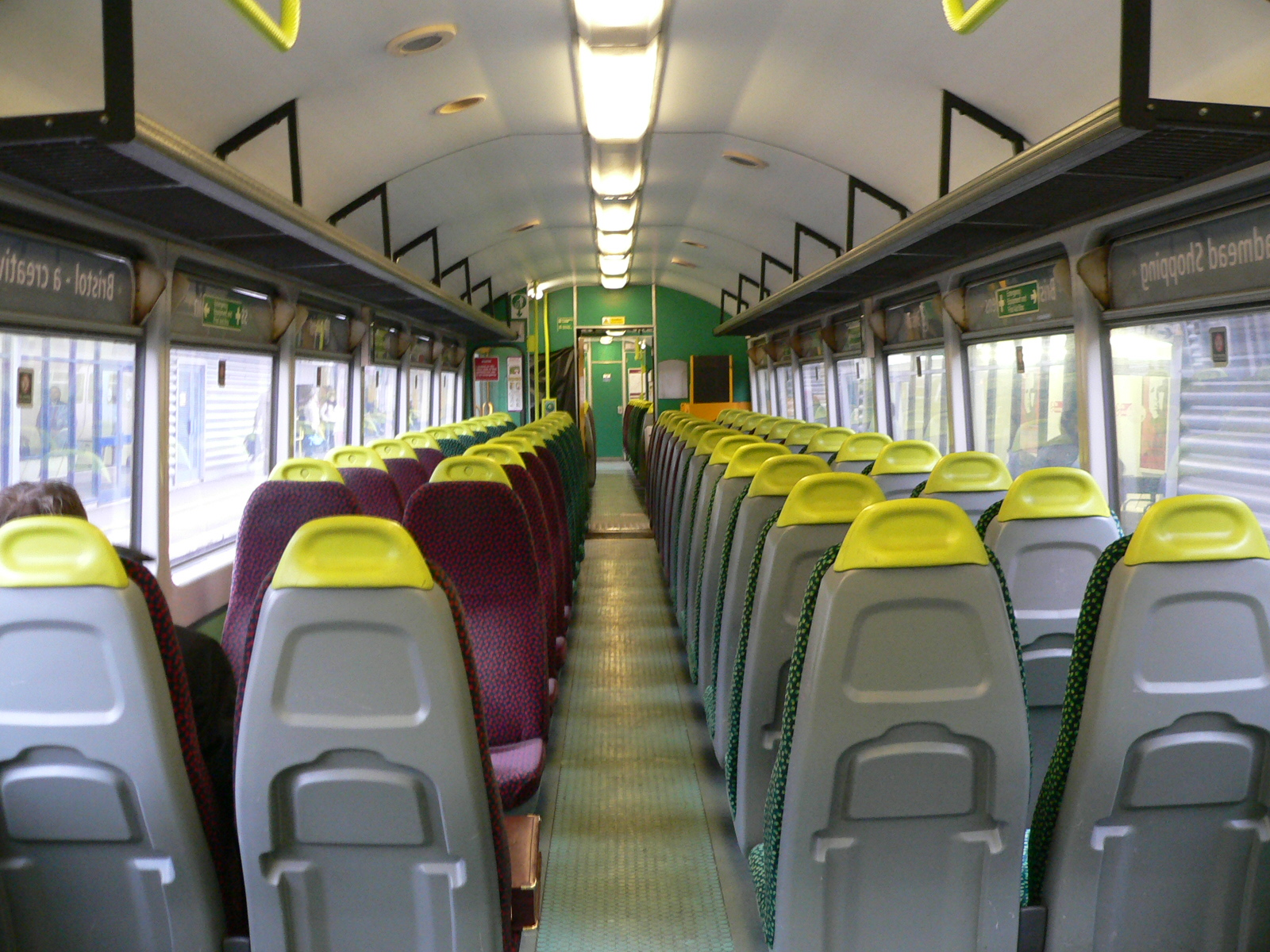
Wessex Trains

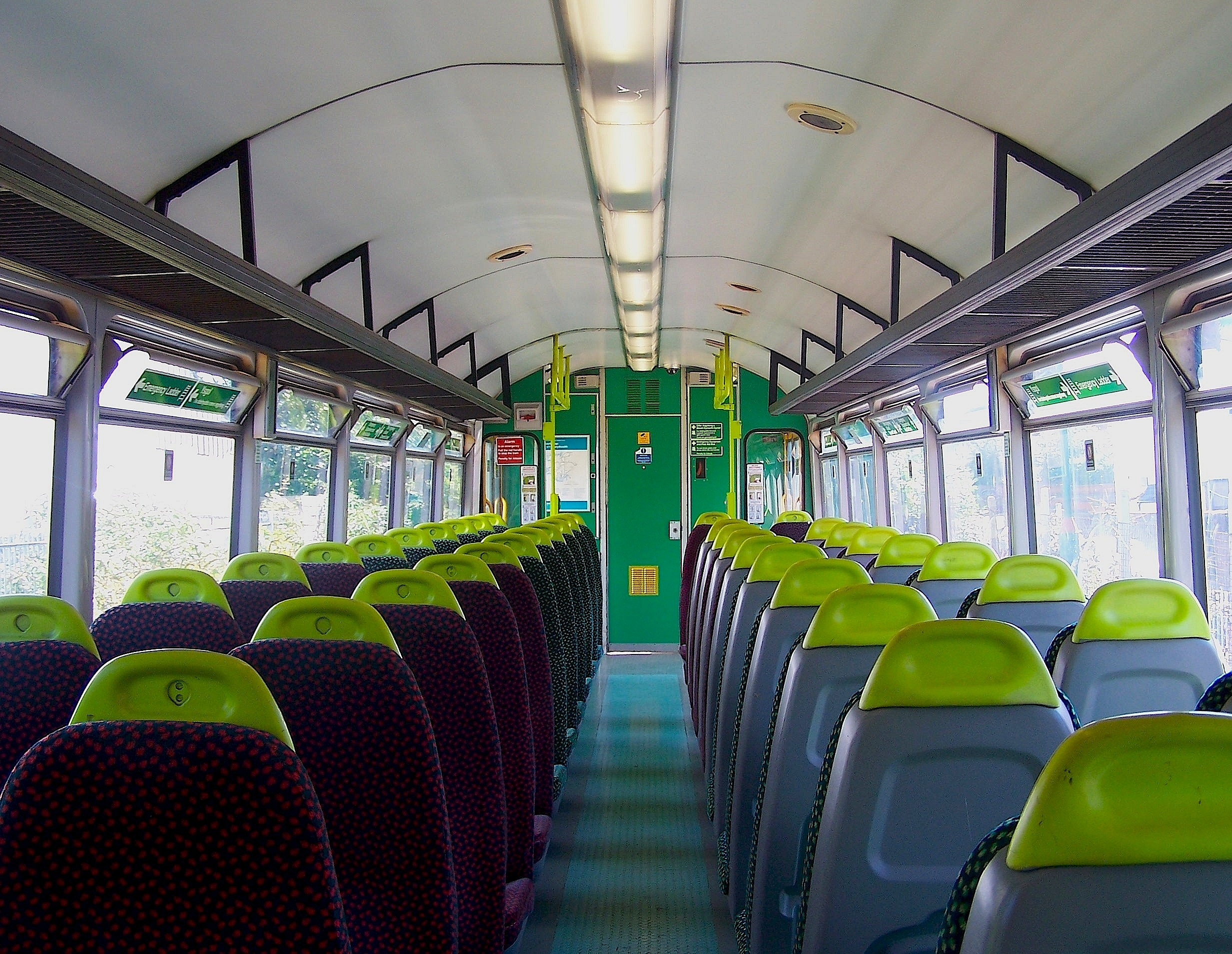
Wales & West 'Valley Lines'

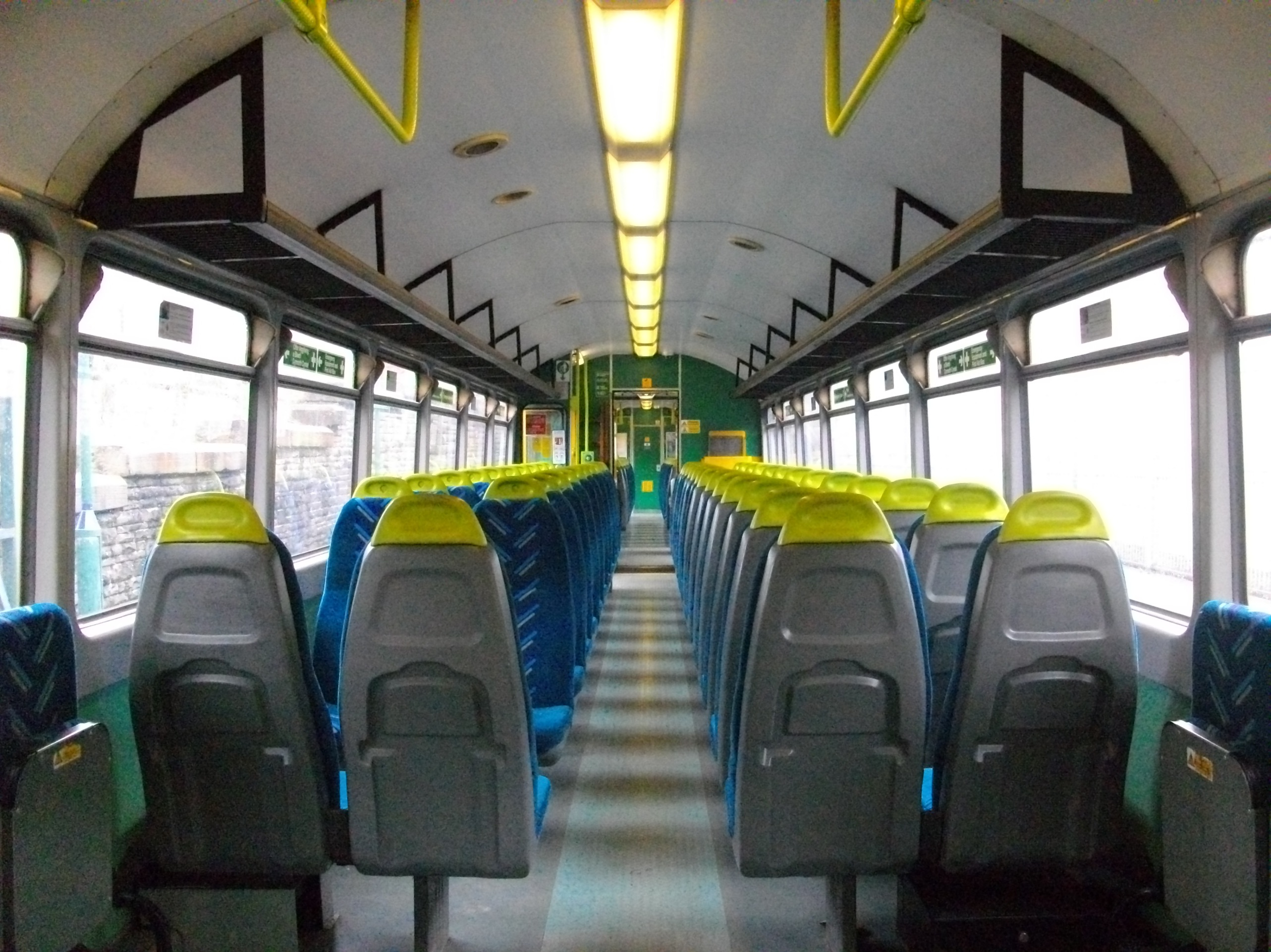
Arriva Trains Wales

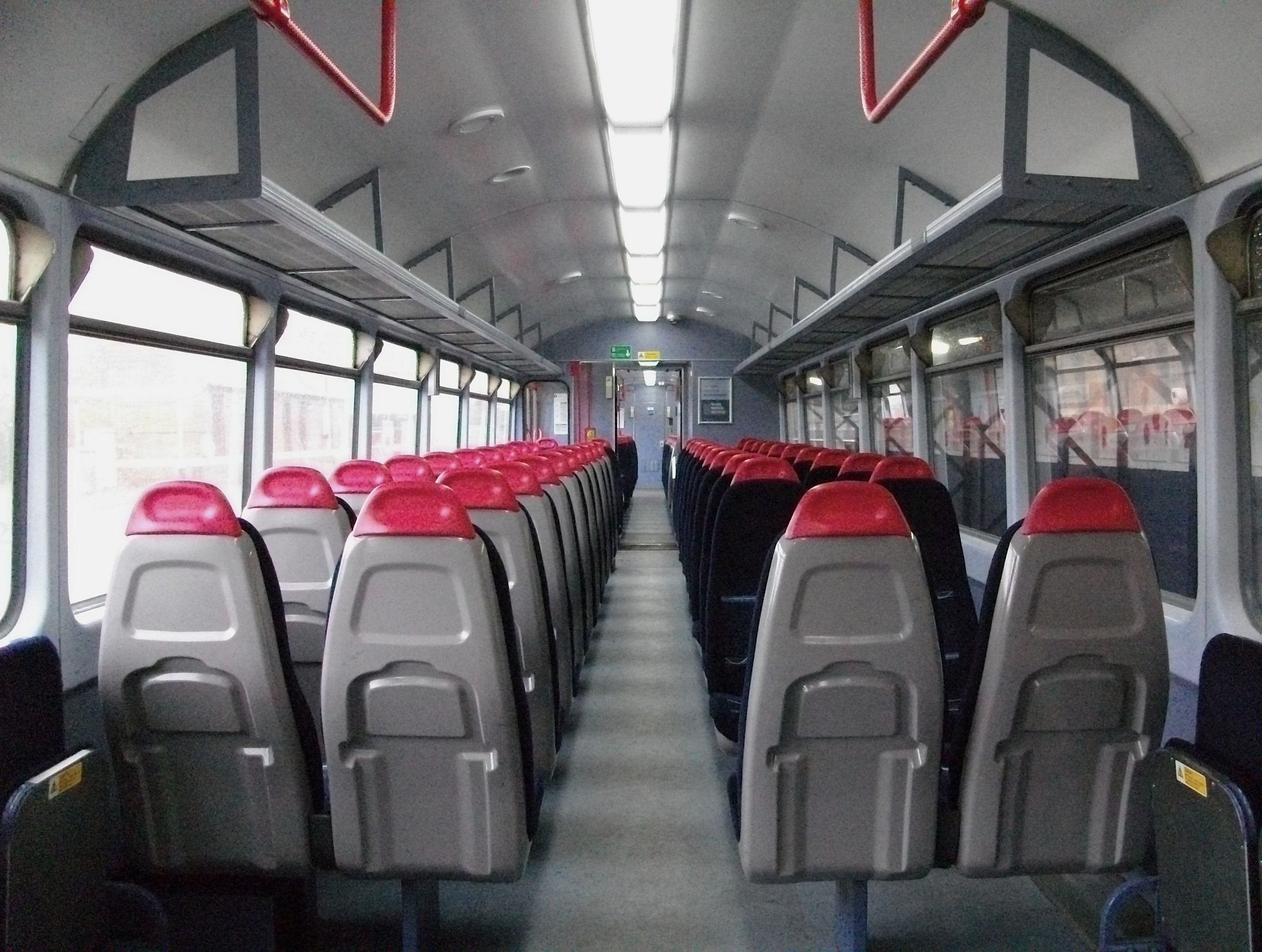
First Great Western

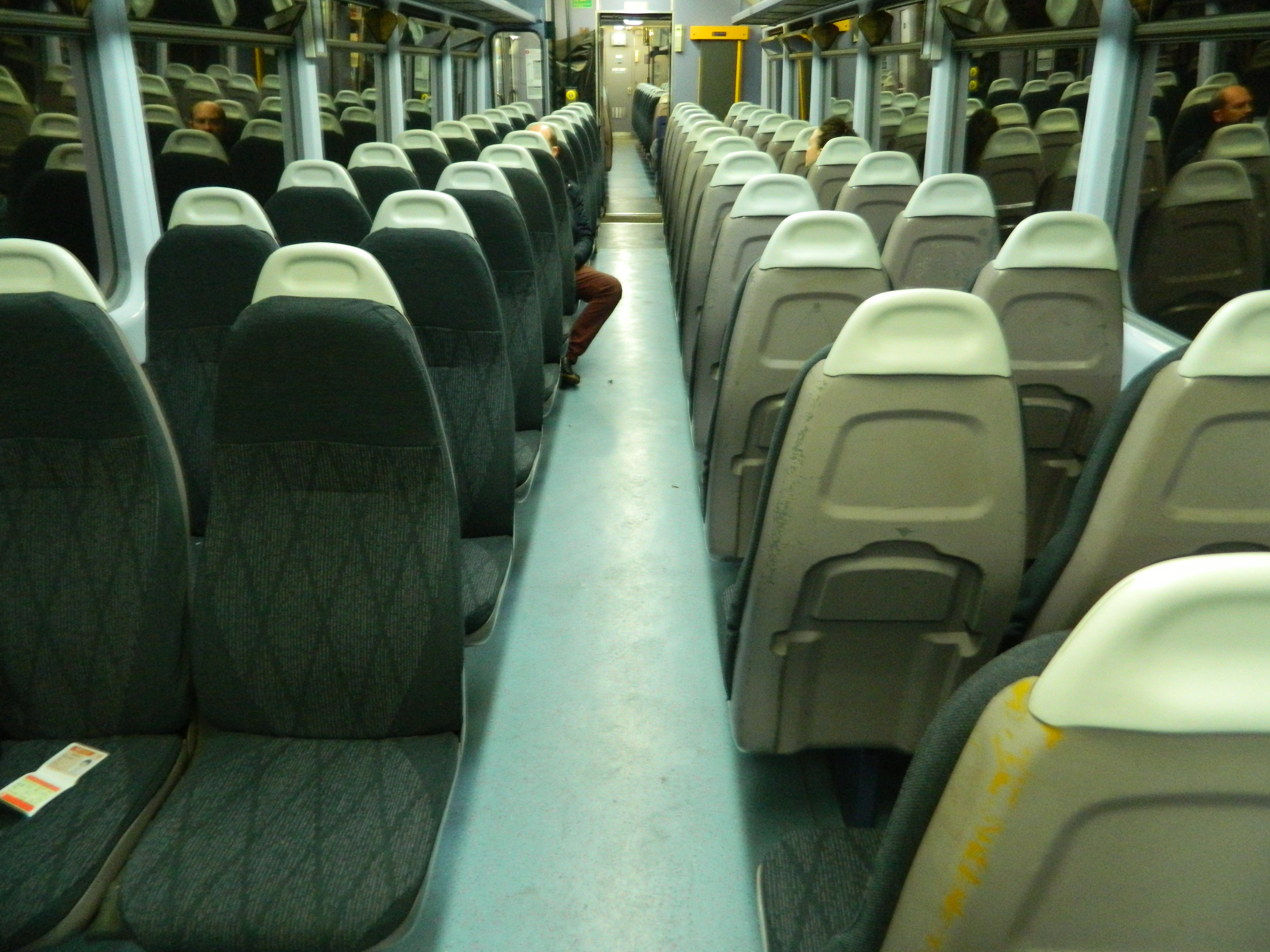
Great Western Railway
