= British Rail Class 142 =

Class of 96 British two-car railbuses

British Rail Class 142 Pacer
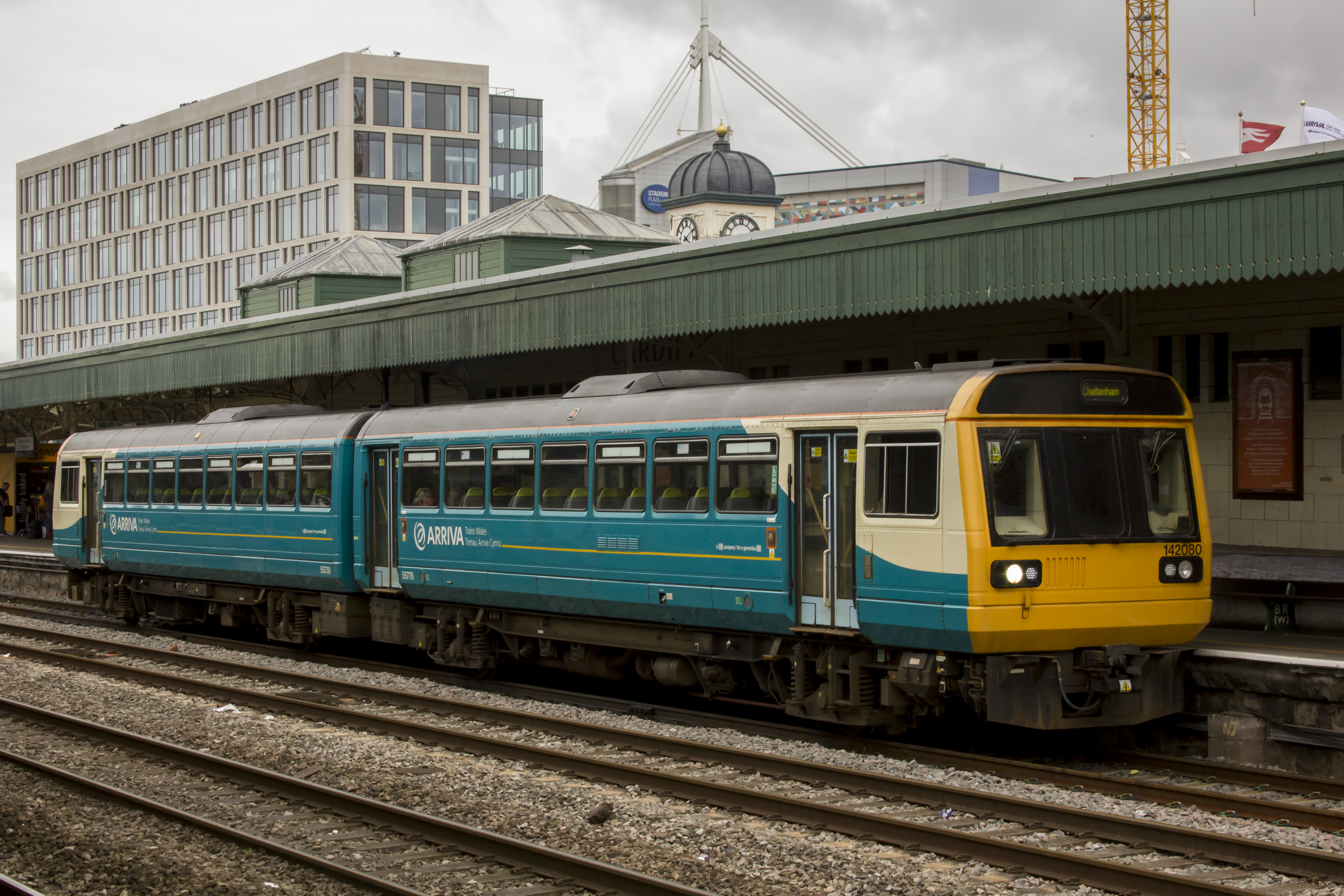
- An Arriva Trains Wales Class 142 at Cardiff Central in 2016

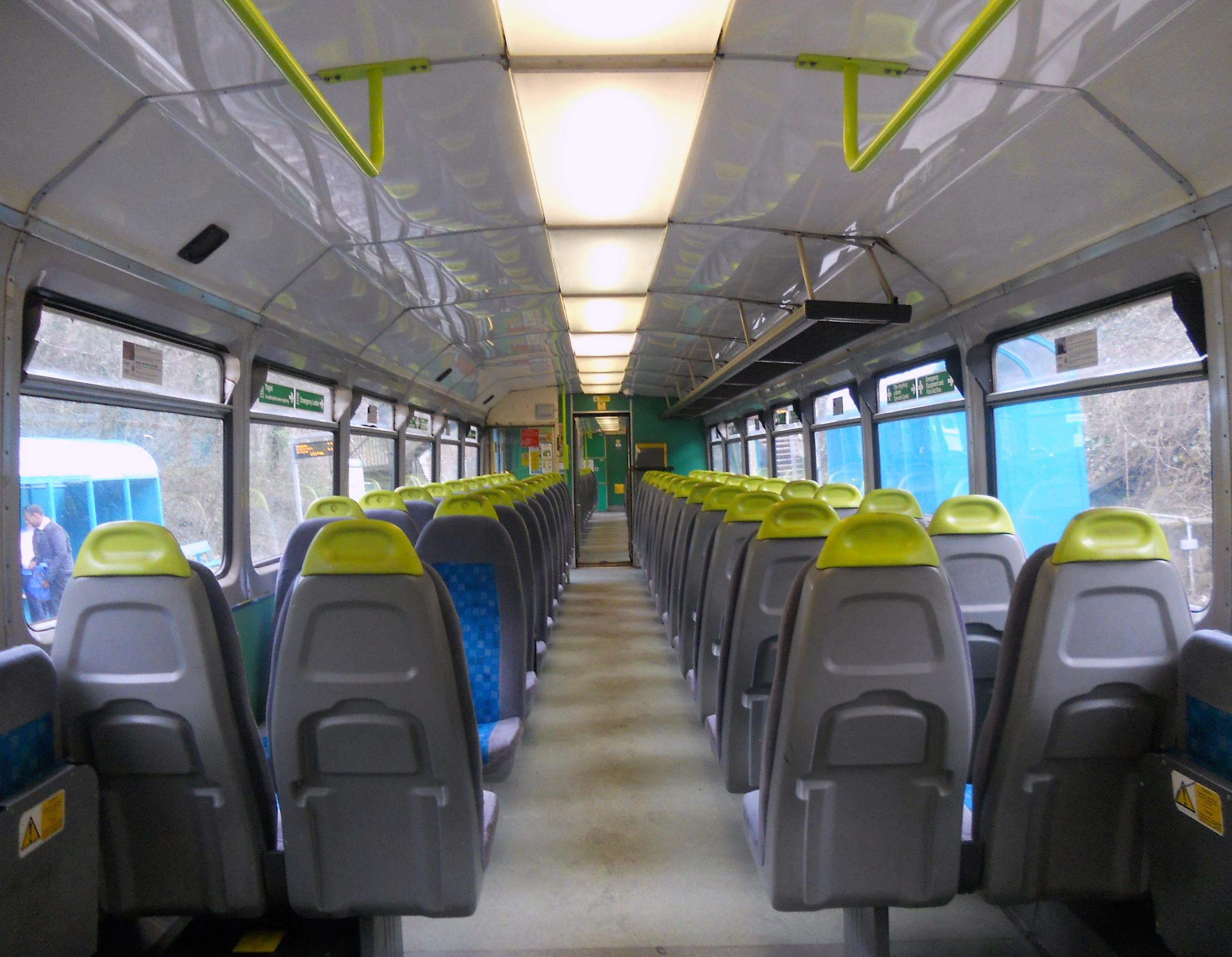
- The Arriva Trains Wales Class 142 interior in 2013
- In service: 1985–2020
- Manufacturers: British Rail Engineering Limited; Leyland Vehicles Limited
- Order nos.: 31003 (DMS vehs. 55542–55591); 31004 (DMSL vehs. 55592–55641); 31013 (DMS vehs. 55701–55746); 31014 (DMSL vehs. 55747–55792)
- Built at: Derby Litchurch Lane Works
- Family name: Pacer
- Constructed: 1985–1987
- Refurbished: 1997–2003; 2008–2017
- Number built: 96
- Number preserved: 35
- Number scrapped: 60
- Formation: 2 vehicles per unit: DMS-DMSL
- Diagram: DMS vehicles: DP234; DMSL vehicles: DP235
- Fleet numbers: 142001–142096
- Capacity: 102 to 121 seats

Specifications
- Car body construction: Steel
- Car length: 15.123 m (49 ft 7.4 in)
- Width: 2.8 m (9 ft 2 in)
- Height: 3.863 m (12 ft 8.1 in)
- Doors: Double-leaf folding (as built); Double-leaf pivot (as refurbished)
- Wheelbase: 9 m (29 ft 6 in)
- Maximum speed: 75 mph (121 km/h)
- Weight: As built; DMS vehs.: approx. 21.0 tonnes (20.7 long tons; 23.1 short tons); DMSL vehs.: approx. 21.5 tonnes (21.2 long tons; 23.7 short tons); After upgrade; DMS vehs.: 24.5 tonnes (24.1 long tons; 27.0 short tons); DMSL vehs.: 25.0 tonnes (24.6 long tons; 27.6 short tons)
- Prime movers: As built: 2 × Leyland TL11; After upgrade: 2 × Cummins LTA10-R; (one per vehicle)
- Engine type: Inline-6 4-stroke turbo-diesel
- Displacement: Leyland: 11.1 L (680 cu in); Cummins: 10.0 L (610 cu in); (per engine)
- Power output: Leyland: 149 kW (200 hp); Cummins: 168 kW (225 hp); (per engine)
- Transmission: As built: SCG RRE5 (4-sp. epicyclic); After upgrade: Voith T 211 r (hydrokinetic)
- UIC classification: 1'A'+A'1'
- Minimum turning radius: 70 m (230 ft)
- Braking systems: Electro-pneumatic (tread) (Westcode)
- Safety systems: AWS; TPWS
- Coupling system: BSI
- Multiple working: Within class, and with Classes 14x, 15x and 170
- Track gauge: 1,435 mm (4 ft 8 1/2 in) standard gauge

Class 142 diesel multiple unit (DMU) passenger trains were built for British Rail (BR) from 1985 to 1987, with a high level of commonality with the widely used Leyland National bus. They are part of the Pacer family of railbuses. The class was withdrawn from service in 2020, due to its non-compliance with key accessibility legislation.

== Background ==
By the beginning of the 1980s, British Rail (BR) operated a large fleet of first-generation diesel multiple units (DMUs), which had been constructed in prior decades to various designs. While formulating its long-term strategy for this sector of its operations, British Rail planners recognised that considerable costs would be incurred by undertaking refurbishment programmes necessary for the continued use of these ageing multiple units, particularly due to the necessity of handling and removing hazardous materials such as asbestos. In the light of the high costs involved in retention, planners examined the prospects for the development and introduction of a new generation of DMUs to succeed the first generation.

In the concept stage, two separate approaches were devised, one involving a so-called railbus that prioritised the minimisation of both initial (procurement) and ongoing (maintenance & operational) costs, while the second was a more substantial DMU that could deliver better performance than the existing fleet, particularly when it came to long-distance services. While the more ambitious latter requirement would ultimately lead to the development of the British Rail Class 151 and the wider Sprinter family of DMUs, BR officials recognised that a cheaper unit was desirable for service on the smaller branch lines that would not be unduly impacted by lower performance specs or a high-density configuration. Work to progress both approaches was therefore undertaken by BR's research department during the early 1980s.

During this period, a number of prototypes were constructed to explore different designs and approaches for implementing the railbus concept. One such vehicle was a single two-car unit, designated Class 140, built between 1979 and 1981. This prototype was introduced with much fanfare in June 1981. Initial testing with the Class 140 uncovered several problems, such as difficulty detecting the type via track circuits. This was reliably resolved by changing the material of the brake blocks from a composite to iron. Two less easily addressable drawbacks were the high level of noise generated during transit, particularly on older jointed rails, a consequence of the railbus's direct connection between the underframe and suspension with the body that transmitted impact forces across the body. It was also observed that the inclusion of strengthening members in the mass-produced bus body added significantly to the overall production cost, which eliminated much of the cost advantage that was the primary goal of the type.

The Class 140 was deemed an overall success, so BR issued an order for an initial production model, designated Class 141, to British Leyland during 1984. During its early years of service, the Class 141 experienced numerous problems, particularly with the transmission and ride quality; work undertaken by BR resulted in the quick development of numerous improvements to at least partially address these shortcomings. When it came to ordering more railbuses, however, it was decided that instead of placing these follow-on orders for further Class 141, it would be more desirable to procure improved derivatives of the Class 141. Accordingly, BR placed orders for two new models of the Pacer family with separate manufacturers, these being the Class 142 and the Class 143.

== Design ==
The Class 142 shared a high degree of similarity to the design of the Class 141. However, one major area of change is that both the Class 142 and Class 143 featured a noticeably wider body, instead of adhering to the width of the standard bus as per the Class 141; specifically, the width was expanded to the maximum amount permissible to remain within the loading gauge. This resulted in an increased internal area to accommodate passengers within, enabling a three-by-two seating arrangement to be installed for a total maximum capacity of 121 seats per set. The increased seating was particularly useful as, in addition to their use on rural feeder services, the Class 142's use on short range urban services had been foreseen by BR planners. Each unit has a seating capacity of between 102 and 121 passengers per two-car set.

Both the bodies and underframes were designed for interchangeability, as had been specified by BR. To achieve this, they were manufactured upon jigs. They had been designed so that the entire body could be replaced during a mid-life refurbishment/reconstruction, and that the replacement body would not be limited to the exact same dimensions either. The underframe area, in addition to its structural role, accommodated all of the propulsion apparatus along with the majority of electrical gear. As a cost-saving measure, the manufacturers were directly to make use of road bus-standard equipment in several areas, including passenger fittings and the general cab layout, along with other areas wherever possible; Unlike the Class 141, which featured automotive-standard wiring for the traction equipment with resulting poor performance, railway-grade wiring for the traction and braking circuits was mandated by BR for both the Class 142 and Class 143 to yield greater reliability.

As originally built, the traction arrangement of the Class 142 consisted of a Leyland TL11 200 horsepower (150 kW) engine, a Self-Changing Gears mechanical automatic gearbox and a Gmeinder final drive unit on each car driving only a single axle. This propulsion arrangement was in part taken from the Leyland National bus, as well as shared with the earlier Class 141. Unlike the Class 141, a microprocessor-based controller for the automatic transmission was used from the onset, allowing the reliability issues posed by defective relay logic and poor earthing present on the predecessor to be entirely avoided. Another improvement was the installation of auto-couplers and auto-connectors that enabled the Class 142 to work in multiple with the Class 150 Sprinter DMUs. The Class 142 is fitted with double-folding external doors, identical to the preceding Class 141. These double-folding external doors were later replaced by dual-leaf inward folding doors. Each car has a fuel capacity of 125 imperial gallons (570 L; 150 US gal).

Both axles (one driving per coach at the inner end) were fitted directly to the chassis rather than being mounted on bogies, unlike traditional DMUs. This uncommon arrangement has been attributed with resulting in the Class 141 units possessing a relatively rough ride, especially when traversing jointed track or points. Their comparatively poor ride quality has been said to be a major factor in the type's general unpopularity amongst passengers. As a positive result from BR's experiences with the Class 141, the Class 142 featured an improved suspension arrangement to enhance passenger comfort, this consisted of a wider spring base and double dampers being installed, features that had been deemed necessary by BR to provide sufficient levels of performance, and had been retrofitted onto all of the older Class 141s as well.

Excessive flange squeal on tight curves has been a problem on many routes operated by the Class 142, caused by the long wheelbase and lack of bogies.

=== Upgrades and refurbishments ===
Starting in the early 1990s, every member of the class was mechanically upgraded due to the original parts starting to fail. Accordingly, each car was refitted with a more powerful Cummins L10 series engine – 230 bhp (170 kW) per car, which equals 460 bhp (340 kW) per twin-car unit – and Voith T 211 r two-stage hydrokinetic transmission, starting with a torque converter which switches to fluid coupling drive once the unit is up to 45 mph (72 km/h). All units were fitted with new Voith transmission by late 1991 and Cummins engines were fitted between 1993 and 1996 to improve reliability. This change has proven to have been largely successful, although isolated failures have occurred, such as when a Northern Rail unit derailed en route from Blackpool to Liverpool in June 2009 due to a cardan shaft failure.

== Operations ==
=== British Rail Provincial/Regional Railways ===
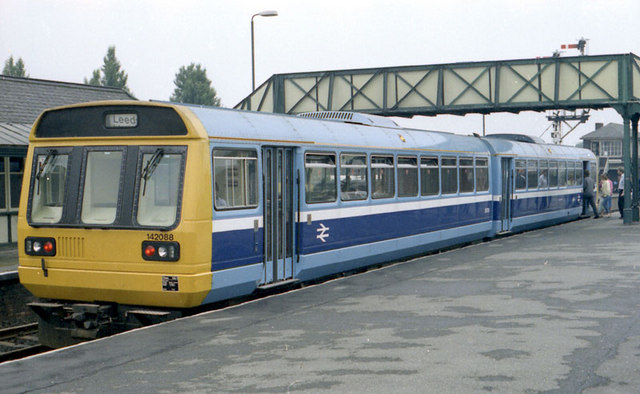
Class 142 in the original British Rail Provincial two-tone blue livery at Castleford in 1987

From new, some units were painted according to the region they operated in. For example, the first 14 Greater Manchester Passenger Transport Executive sponsored units (142001-014) received GMPTE orange and brown, then the next 13 West Country based units (142015-027) were painted in a Great Western Railway inspired chocolate and cream livery and marketed as 'Skippers'.

==== Canada ====
Unit 142049 was sent to Vancouver, Canada for Expo 86. The unit retained its Regional Railways livery and ran three trips a day all summer from Abbotsford to New Westminster. In order to operate on Canadian rails, it was equipped with radio and ditch lights, and given the designation RB100 for radio identification.

=== Post privatisation ===
==== Northern England ====
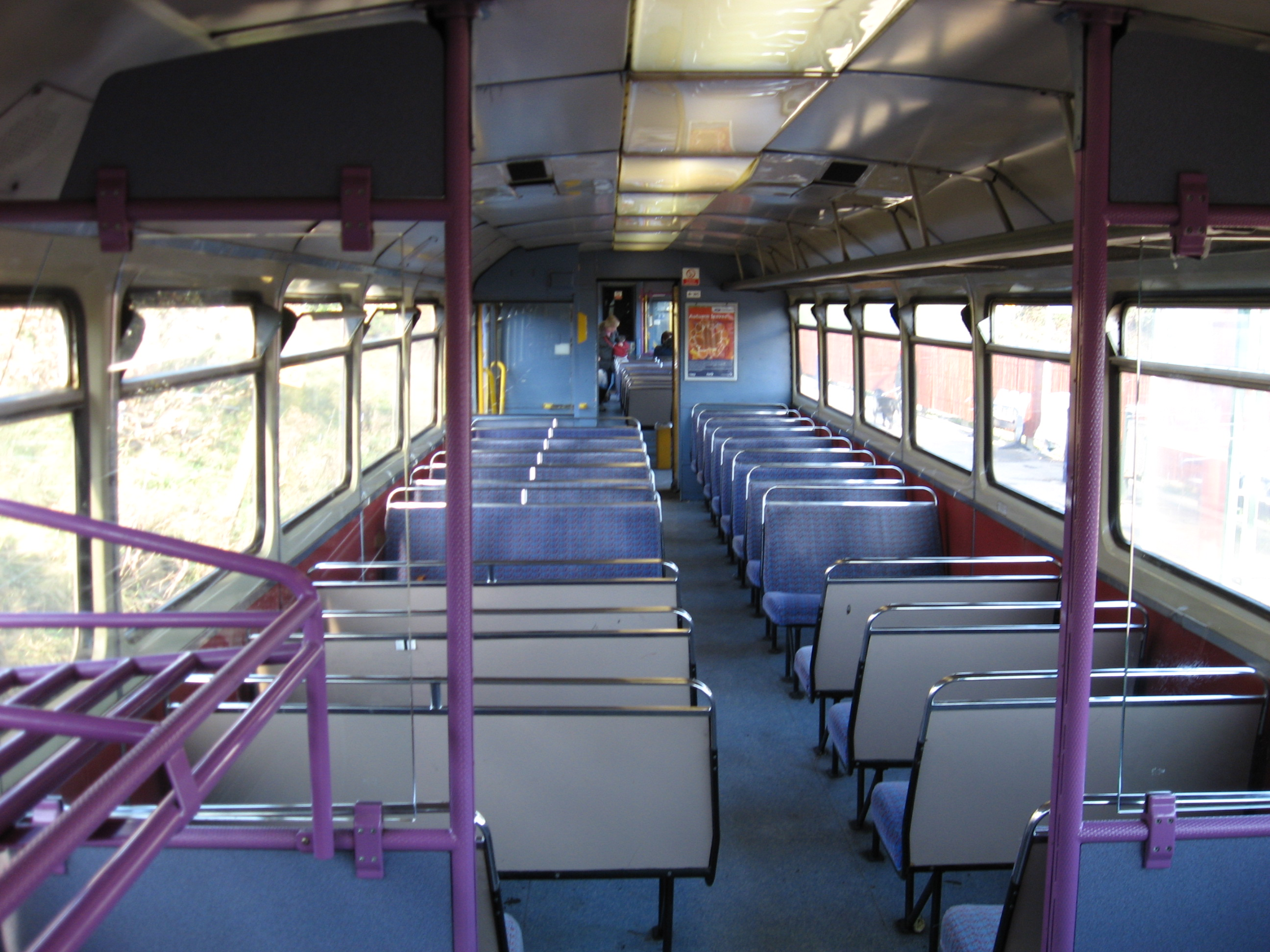
The interior of a refreshed First North Western Class 142

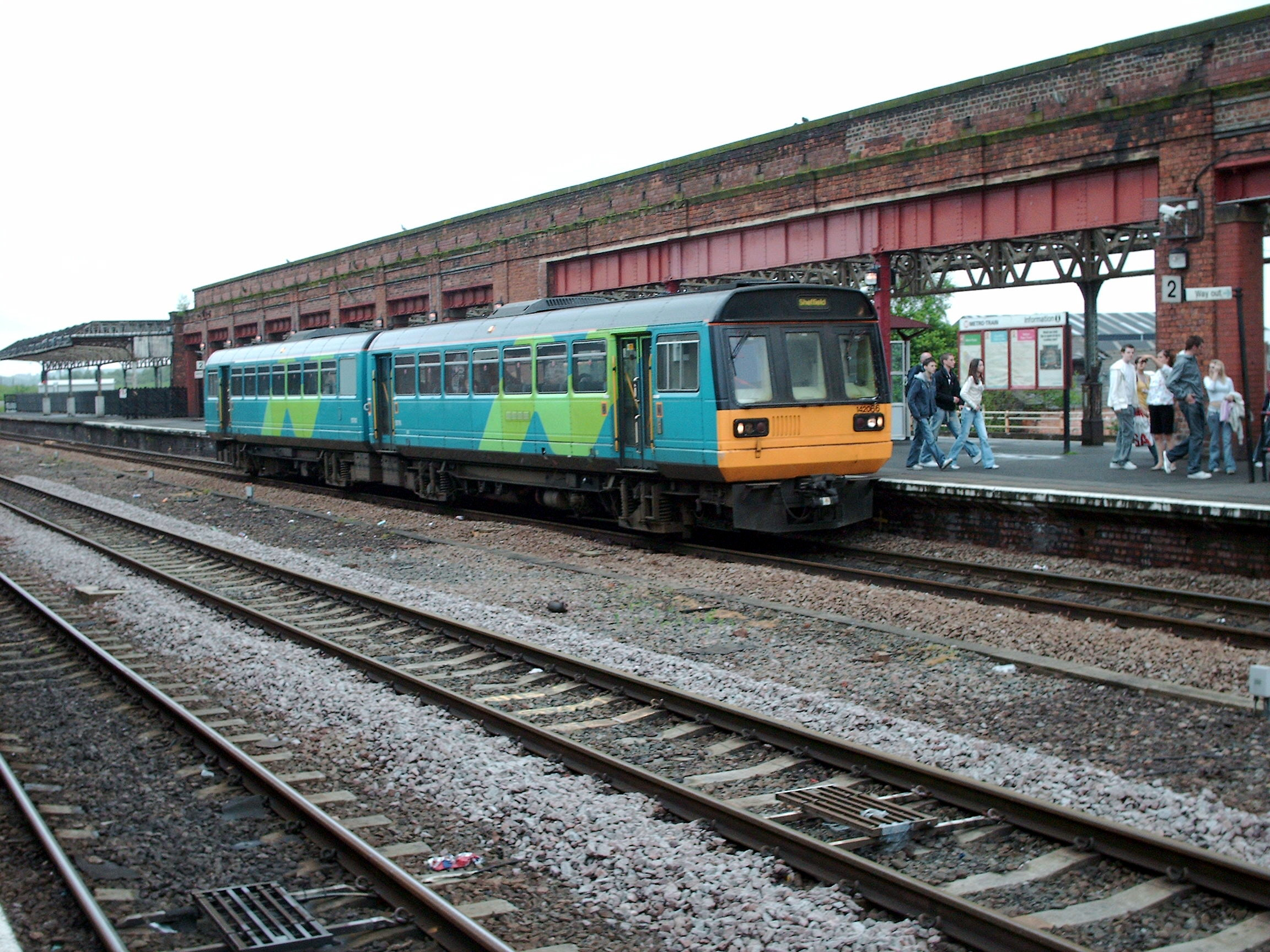
Northern Spirit liveried Class 142 at Wakefield Kirkgate in 2006

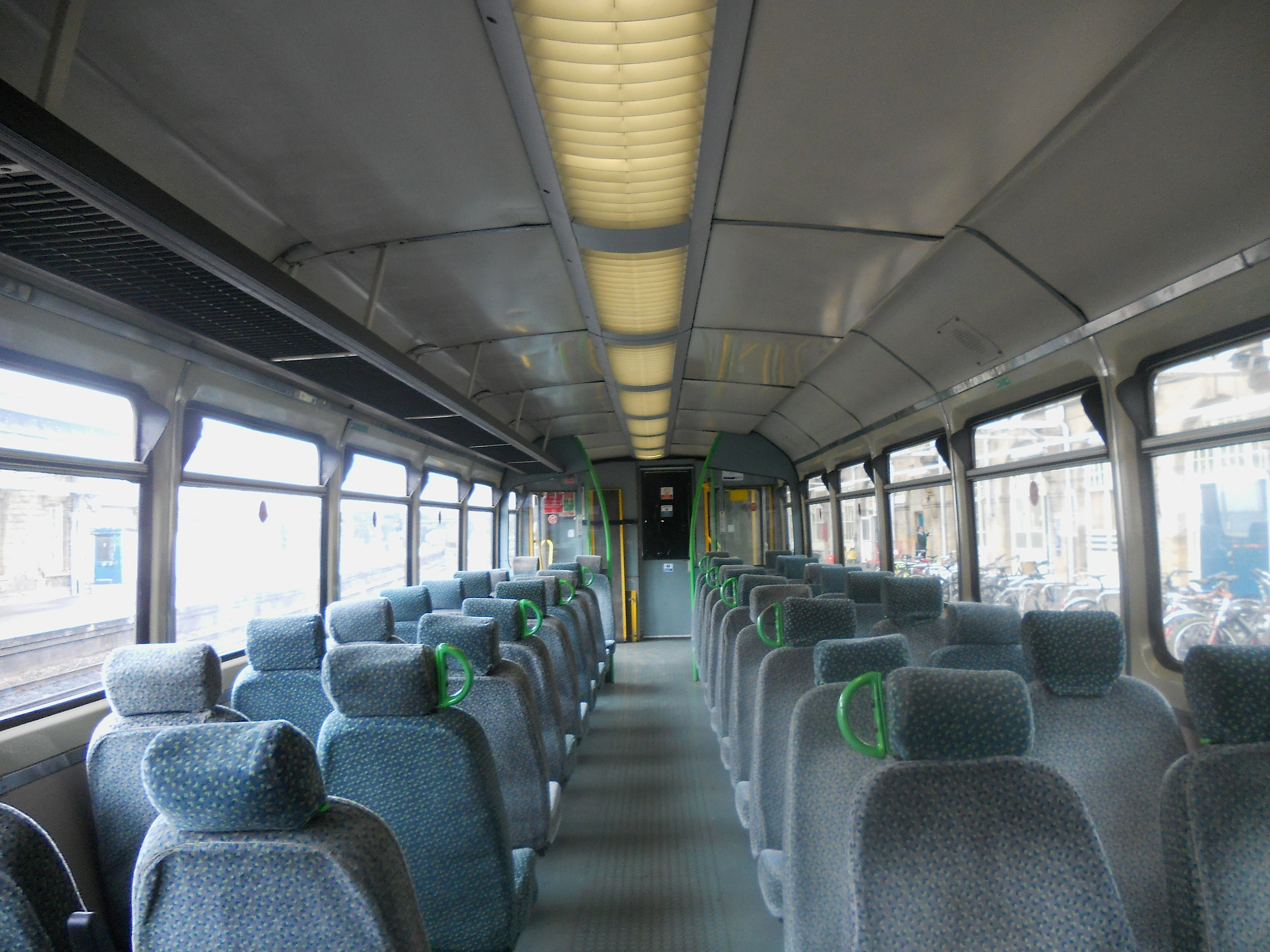
The interior of a Northern Spirit refurbished Class 142

Upon the privatisation of British Rail, the Class 142 fleet was divided between North Western Trains in the North West and Northern Spirit in the North East.

Northern Spirit began operations in 1997 and continued until 2000. At this point, parent company MTL ran into difficulties and the company was sold to Arriva, who renamed it Arriva Trains Northern in 2001.

In 1998, ATN swapped seven Class 142s (142085–142091) for seven Class 150/2 units from Valley Lines. In October–December 2002, these were swapped for non-refurbished units 142072-77 and 080–3, as 142086-091 had only recently been refurbished by Northern Spirit and Valley Lines wished to start their refurbishment from scratch.

In 2004, First North Western and Arriva Trains Northern were merged into the Northern rail franchise, which inherited a combined fleet of 79 Class 142s.

All 79 Class 142s were painted into the Northern Rail livery. Due to rising passenger numbers in the north of England (by about 10% per annum and even by over 25% per annum at some stations where the 142s were in operation), some units had been replaced by Sprinter trains.

Five Class 142 Pacers, in service with First Great Western, were returned to Northern Rail in December 2008. The rest returned to Northern Rail by November 2011, much later than originally planned.

Despite being built for branch-line stopping services, the Class 142s were mainly used on urban commuter services in and out of cities like Liverpool, Manchester, Sheffield, Leeds and Newcastle, and were seen on longer-distance services of up to three hours including the 1632 Middlesbrough-Carlisle service – nearly 110 miles (180 km); they had also been used on services between Blackpool North and Chester via Stockport, which ceased to operate in December 2008. All 79 passed with the Northern franchise to Arriva Rail North in April 2016, and any remaining units transferred to the government-owned operator Northern Trains on 1 March 2020.

In June 2020, it was announced that 13 Class 142s would be allowed to re-enter service if necessary, the units being 142004, 018, 023, 058, 065, 068, 070, 071, 078, 087, 090, 094 and 095, which they did on 6 July 2020 following the introduction of a new timetable, due to a need for extra capacity for social distancing during the COVID-19 pandemic, coupled to Class 150s so as to avoid needing to be non-PRM (persons of reduced mobility) modified.

Pacers were withdrawn from Northern Trains on 27 November 2020, the last service being the 16:36 Kirkby to Manchester Victoria, operated by 142004.

==== Wales ====
Valley Lines acquired its Class 142s by swapping Class 150/2 units with Arriva Trains Northern. The Class 142s were initially painted in Valley Lines livery.

Transport for Wales Class 142 in 2019

Transport for Wales used its Class 142 Pacer trains on the commuter lines around Cardiff, Barry and Penarth known as the Valley lines. All of its Class 142 Pacer fleet wore the turquoise and cream house colours of Arriva Trains Wales. The Class 142 units were also primarily used on South Wales Valley line routes and routes through the Vale of Glamorgan. On Valley and Vale of Glamorgan services, Class 142s were often coupled together with Class 143 or Class 150 units to cope with demand on the busy Valley Lines network. The Class 142s received minor refurbishments with retrimmed seats in new moquette, plus the installation of ceiling-mounted CCTV cameras.

== Withdrawal ==
All 94 Class 142s were to be withdrawn by mid-2020, as they did not comply with the Persons with Reduced Mobility Technical Specification for Interoperability (PRM-TSI).

Bidders for the Northern franchise that commenced in April 2016 were required to order new DMUs and take on Sprinters and Turbostars (Classes 150, 156, 158 and 170) released by other franchises as replacement. The Long Term Passenger Rolling Stock Strategy for the Rail Industry indicates up to 500 non-electric carriages will need to be built in the short term. Arriva Rail North withdrawals were scheduled to commence in November 2018 with the last to be removed from traffic in October 2019. This was slightly delayed until the first Class 195 entered service.

Wales & Borders franchise holder KeolisAmey Wales planned to replace all of its Class 142s by mid-2020.

In August 2019, Arriva Rail North retired seven and placed them in store at Heaton TMD. Scrapping commenced in December 2019 with 142005 taken to CF Booth, Rotherham. In December 2019, three withdrawn Arriva Rail North units were transferred to Transport for Wales for spare parts.

In December 2019, both Arriva Rail North and Transport for Wales were issued derogations to allow use into 2020. Northern Trains was permitted to operate the units until 31 May 2020, but only when coupled to a compliant unit, while Transport for Wales was permitted to use the units until 31 July 2020 and could be operated alone. This was later extended to 31 December 2020 for both operators.

The final Class 142s were withdrawn from Northern Trains in November 2020 and Transport for Wales in December 2020.

== Preservation ==
Several operational Class 142 units have been preserved and additional sets are set to be saved/earmarked for preservation; most of which so far being ex-Northern operated units with one being an ex-Arriva Trains Wales unit. The pioneer unit, 142001, is part of the National Collection and preserved at the National Railway Museum Shildon. Other units have also been purchased, but will only be used to provide spare parts to the units which are planned to operate on heritage railways or museums.

=== Operational ===
Unit	Vehicle numbers		Livery	Location	Notes
Unit	DMS	DMSL	Livery	Location	Notes
142001	55542	55592	Northern Rail (unbranded)	National Railway Museum Shildon	Operational. First unit built.
142003	55544	55594	Greater Manchester PTE (orange and brown)	LNWR Heritage, Crewe; Locomotive Services Limited	Preserved in April 2020 and repainted at Eastleigh Works.
142004	55545	55595	Northern Rail (unbranded)	Telford Steam Railway	Privately owned. Arrived at Telford in April 2021.
142006	55547	55597	Arriva Trains Wales (unbranded)	Llanelli & Mynydd Mawr Railway	Arrived 15 February 2021. It is the only Arriva Trains Wales unit not to be scrapped. To be restored to Valley Lines Livery.
142011	55552	55602	Northern Rail (unbranded)	Midland Railway – Butterley	To be used as spares for 142013.
142013	55554	55604	Northern Rail (unbranded)	Midland Railway – Butterley	Restored to full working condition and in original GM Colours.
142017	55558	55608	Northern Rail (unbranded)	East Kent Railway	Privately owned. Preserved as "a good value and reliable form of traction to secure the long term future of the railway".
142018	55559	55609	Northern Rail (unbranded)	Wensleydale Railway	Preserved on 3 March 2021. To be repainted into Skipper Chocolate and Cream livery.
142019	55560	55610	Northern Rail (unbranded)	Waverley Route Heritage Centre	Arrived mid-February 2020.
142020	55561	55611	Merseyrail (unbranded)	Waverley Route Heritage Centre	Arrived early 2020.
142023	55564	55614	Northern Rail (unbranded)	Plym Valley Railway	Arrived late 2020.
142029	55570	55620	Northern Rail (unbranded)	Chasewater Railway	One of five sets made that display the fewest internal modifications, making it close to "original" condition.
142030	55571	55621	Northern Rail (unbranded)	Chasewater Railway	The fourth Class 142 to be preserved, chosen due to being in close-to "original" internal condition.
142035	55576	55626	Northern Rail (unbranded)	Wensleydale Railway	Possibly for use as parts donor.
142036	55577	55627	Northern Rail (unbranded)	East Kent Railway	Preserved as "a good value and reliable form of traction to secure the long term future of the railway".
142038	55629	55579	Northern Rail (unbranded)	Mid-Norfolk Railway	Owned by the Mid-Norfolk Railway Preservation Trust; arrived 2020.
142041	55582	55632	Northern Rail (unbranded)	Wensleydale Railway	Merseyrail Class 142 variant modified with high-capacity 3+2 seating and dot matrix destination indicators.
142055	55705	55751	Northern Rail (unbranded)	Foxfield Railway	Merseyrail Class 142 variant modified with high capacity 3+2 seating and dot matrix destination indicators.
142058	55708	55754	Northern Rail (unbranded)	Telford Steam Railway	Arrived at Telford in April 2021.
142060	55710	55756	Northern Spirit	Wensleydale Railway	Moved to the railway in 2020, reliveried in 2026.
142061	55711	55757	Northern Rail (unbranded)	Mid-Norfolk Railway	Owned by the MNRPT; arrived September 2020.
142084	55734	55780	Northern Rail (unbranded)	Rushden Transport Museum	Arrived at Rushden in early 2020.
142091	55741	55787	Northern Rail (unbranded)	Rushden Transport Museum	Arrived at Rushden in early 2020.

=== Non-railway use ===
Alongside the operational preserved units, some have been acquired for non-railway use:

Unit	Vehicle numbers		Location	Notes
Unit	DMS	DMSL	Location	Notes
142028	55569	55619	Wensleydale Railway	Purchased by a couple who work on the line, for conversion into a home.
142033	55574	55624	Bridgend, Wales	Acquired by South Wales Police for training.
142043	55584	55634	Kingstanding Police Training Centre	Acquired by Sussex Police for training.
142045	55586	55636	Kirk Merrington Primary School, Kirk Merrington	Acquired for use as a library.

== Fleet details ==
Class	Status	Qty.	Year built	Cars per unit	Unit numbers
142	Scrapped	26	1985	2	142002, 142005, 142008–142010, 142012, 142015–142016, 142021–142022, 142024–142026, 142031–142032, 142034, 142037, 142039–142040, 142042, 142044, 142046–142050
142	Scrapped	34	1986–1987	2	142051–142054, 142057, 142059, 142062–142077, 142079–142083, 142085–142086, 142088, 142092–142093, 142095–142096
142	Preserved	21	1985	2	142001, 142003–142004, 142006–142007, 142011, 142013, 142017–142020, 142023, 142027–142030, 142035–142036, 142038, 142041, 142047
142	Preserved	10	1986–1987	2	142055, 142058, 142060–142061, 142078, 142084, 142087, 142090–142091, 142094
142	Converted for off-railway use	3	1985	2	142033, 142043, 142045

=== Named units ===
Some units received names:

- 142009 Newton Heath 125 1876-2001 (Scrapped)
- 142073 Myfanwy (Scrapped)
- 142080 Caerphilly RFC (Scrapped)

== Accidents ==
- Two Class 142 units were withdrawn through accident damage. The first of which was unit 142059, which was withdrawn in 1991 after colliding with a buffer stop at Liverpool Lime Street. The train had run away down the hill from Edge Hill whilst returning with brake problems. The train was running without passengers at the time and the driver and guard both survived the accident without serious lasting injury. The platforms were evacuated in time before the train struck the buffers.
- The most serious accident involving a Class 142 was at Winsford in 1999. The driver of Class 142 No. 142008 operated by First North Western, running empty from Crewe to Liverpool Lime Street overran a red signal on the slow line and stopped in the path of the 06:15 London Euston to Glasgow Central Virgin Trains express, hauled by a Class 87 electric locomotive, No. 87027 Wolf of Badenoch. The impact, which caused the unit to be written off, severed the Pacer's body from its frames and caused severe internal damage. 27 people were injured, 3 seriously.
- On 11 June 2009, a Class 142 (No. 142042) operated by Northern Rail derailed while en route from Blackpool to Liverpool. All but one of the 40 passengers on board escaped injury. An initial investigation was carried out by the Rail Accident Investigation Branch which determined that the engine mounted under the rear coach became detached and fell onto the track at a recorded speed of 57 mph, derailing the rear axle. The detachment of the engine caused extensive damage to underfloor equipment, severing control wires and damaging the braking system resulting in an automatic emergency brake application. Problems with engines on 142s have been experienced before.
- On 8 August 2009, Arriva Trains Wales unit 142069 derailed during an empty stock movement at Rhymney, South Wales. The unit was preparing to work a morning service with 143625 when it derailed on a set of points and hit the platform edge. 142069 was later removed by road to Cardiff Canton depot and fears were raised that the frame might have been damaged beyond repair. These fears proved unfounded and the unit later returned to service.
- On 3 October 2009, a Class 142 unit, operated by Northern Rail, hit the rear end of a departing National Express East Coast service at Darlington railway station. Three passengers from the Northern Rail train were taken to hospital with minor injuries.
- On 4 January 2010, unit 142029 collided with a train comprising two Class 159 diesel multiple units at Exeter St Davids. Nine people were injured.
- On 10 April 2011, a cardan shaft failure on 142045 led to an incident at Durham, injuring a member of the public with a piece of ballast kicked up by the detached shaft.
- On 27 April 2012, unit 142091 was working the 1125 Lincoln – Adwick service when it hit a landslide after exiting Clarborough Tunnel near Retford causing major frontal damage to the unit. Two people were taken to hospital with minor injuries, one of these being the driver. The landslide was blamed on heavy rain and poor drainage. The unit has since returned to service.
- On 4 October 2016, unit 142072 caught fire at Caerphilly.
- On 9 October 2018, unit 142086 derailed at Sheffield station.

=== Safety criticism ===
In 1999, following the Winsford railway accident, the safety of the trains were criticised, with concerns regarding the crashworthiness of the design compared to modern units. In 2009, John Pugh, the then Liberal Democrat MP for Southport, described the Class 142 as "unsafe". However the UK Government's Transport Secretary at the time Geoff Hoon denied this claim saying, "I would not accept that any of that rolling stock is unsafe", and that they constantly upgrade them. In 2011, the Office of Rail Regulation (ORR) queried the safety of the Pacer trains, stating "There is particular concern over the ongoing use of Pacers beyond their intended design life." Northern Rail insisted that the trains were safe, and that they are "subject to strict regular safety and maintenance checks".
