= Self-Changing Gears =

British company

Self-Changing Gears was a British company, set up and owned equally by Walter Gordon Wilson and John Davenport Siddeley, to develop and exploit the Wilson or pre-selector gearbox. Self-Changing Gears designed, built and licensed transmissions for various applications including light and heavy road vehicles, military, marine, and rail vehicles as well as motor racing cars.

== Ownership changes ==
Following the death of Walter Wilson in 1957, his son A Gordon Wilson took over the running of the company until his retirement in 1965.

The original company Improved Gears Ltd was incorporated on 28 December 1928, and this later became Self-Changing Gears (SCG). The company moved a number of times in the early years, and in 1938 settled in premises at Lythalls Lane, Coventry. During World War II, additional premises were used at Burbage, Leicestershire.

In 1935, Siddeley sold his interests in Armstrong Siddeley (including Self-Changing Gears) to Hawker Aircraft forming Hawker Siddeley. In 1951 Leyland Motors bought into the company, resulting in each party owning one-third of the company, and in 1957 Leyland bought-out Hawker-Siddeley's shares, thereby gaining control. In 1986 the business was sold to Cummins.

== Railway applications ==
Many of British Railways' first generation diesel multiple units and shunting locomotives had gearboxes made by Self-Changing Gears. Examples include British Rail Class 100, 03 and 04; some of these are still in use on heritage railways. In the 1980s, SCG gearboxes were fitted to 141, 142, 143,. 144 and 150 class DMUs.

The name Self-Changing Gears is sometimes confusing: the gearboxes are not fully automatic, selection of gear ratio remains a manual choice, but the gear-changing and any clutch control needed is automated. The gearboxes were used in conjunction with a fluid coupling so no clutch pedal was needed.

Gearboxes installed in locomotives built by the Vulcan Foundry for the Drewry Car Company were designated "Wilson-Drewry".

== Bus applications ==
The bus manufacturing industry was a major customer of the company. Buses on city work need to start and stop every minute or less, and the effort required with a manual gearbox was substantial. In addition, for most of the period when these transmissions were dominant buses still had unassisted steering, and the overall effort needed without assistance was fatiguing.

From about 1935 to 1960, buses by AEC, Daimler, and sometimes Bristol, Guy and Leyland offered Preselector gearboxes, either as an option or as standard. London buses invariably used this transmission, along with other cities. Country area buses still commonly retained manual transmissions as they did not have the requirement of constant stopping and starting at bus stops. The London specification included compressed air operation of the change-gear pedal, where others used unassisted operation.

Around 1960, the bus industry was changing from traditional vehicles with engine at the front and driver in a small separate cabin alongside, to entrance at the front alongside the driver, and the engine and gearbox remotely mounted under the floor or at the rear. SCG devised the semi-automatic gearbox, under their brand name "Pneumocyclic" as an advance. It had the same gearbox principle, but instead of pre-selecting a gear and then separately operating a change-gear pedal, both functions were combined and operated from a small lever alongside the steering wheel, the driver merely moving this to the next gear and the transmission responding accordingly. The mechanism was operated either by air pressure or low-voltage electrics and the physical gear-shifting in the gearbox was nearly always by air pressure, though some vehicles used high pressure hydraulics, notably BMMO vehicles. This style of transmission was also widespread in UK buses, from a range of manufacturers, until different types came onto the market in the 1980s. A further advance was the fully automatic gearbox, which still used the same principles but shifted gears automatically. This was pioneered on the AEC Routemaster, and later spread, although not widely, to other vehicle types.
