= British Rail Class 141 =

Diesel multiple unit railbuses (1984–2005)

British Rail Class 141 Pacer
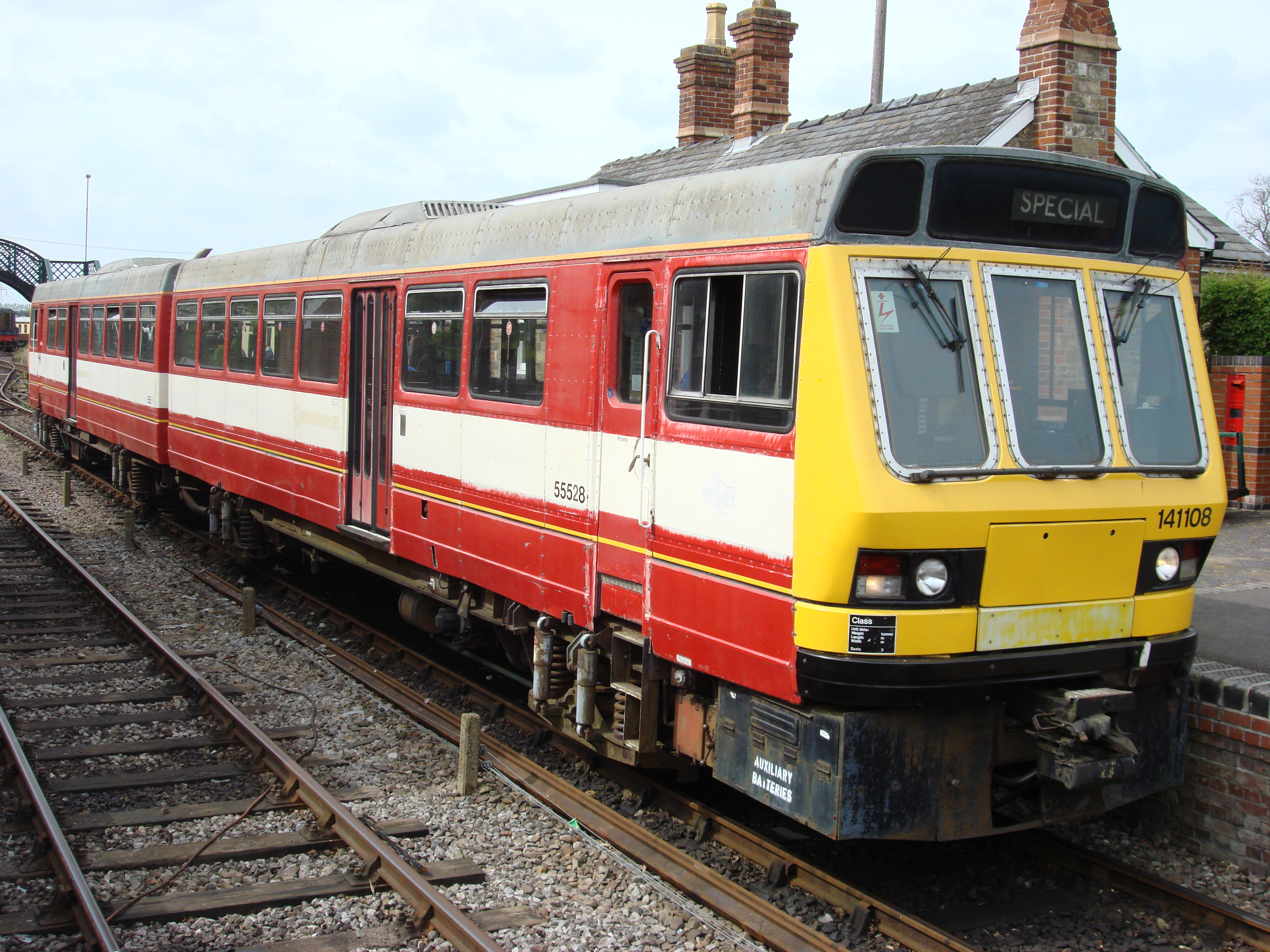
- Class 141 at the Colne Valley Railway in 2007

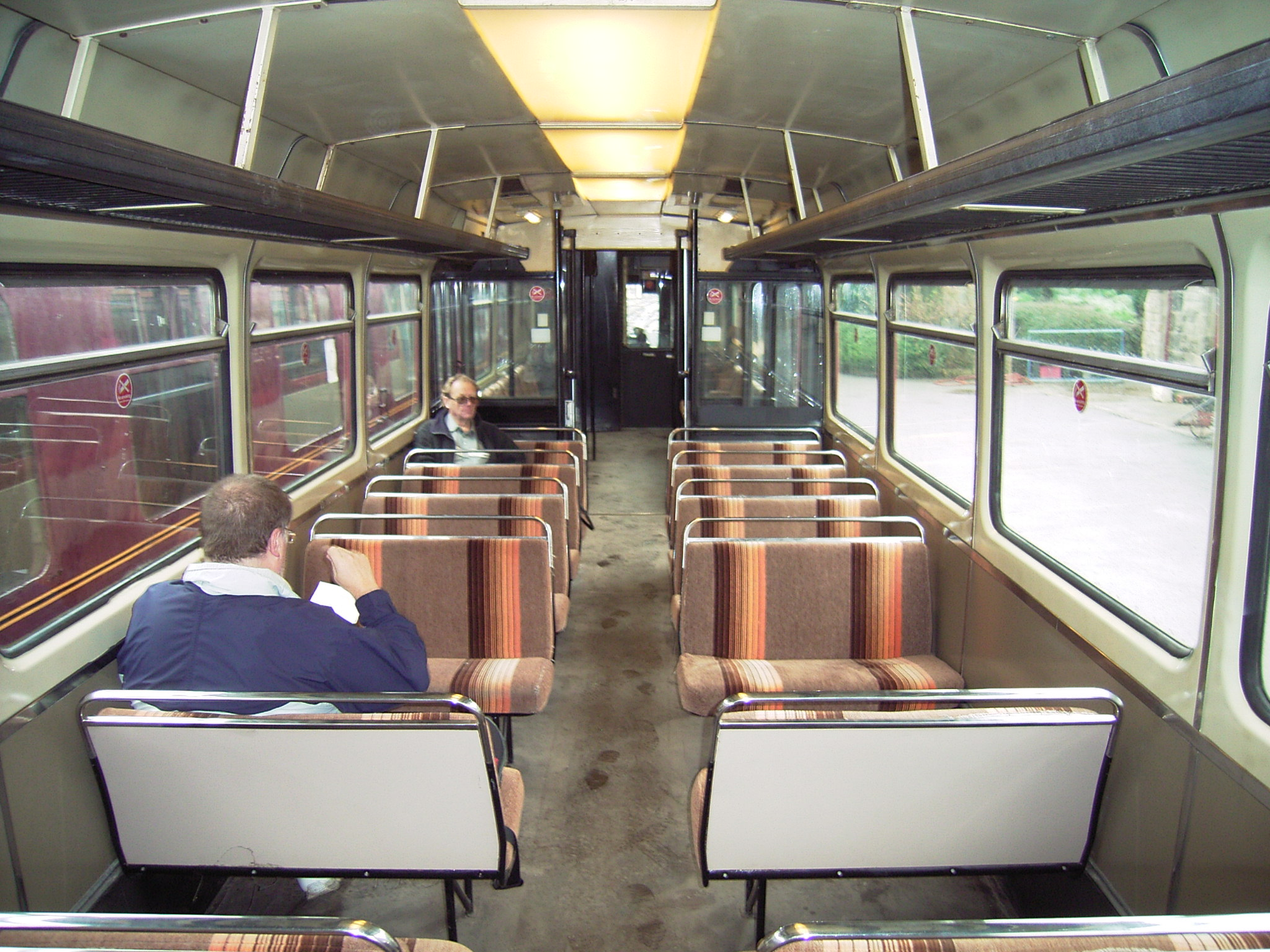
- Interior of a Class 141
- In service: 1984–2005
- Manufacturers: British Rail Engineering Limited; Leyland Vehicles Limited
- Order nos.: 30977 (DMS vehicles); 30978 (DMSL vehicles)
- Built at: Derby Litchurch Lane Works
- Family name: Pacer
- Constructed: 1984
- Refurbished: 1988–1989
- Number built: 20
- Number in service: 0
- Number preserved: 2
- Number scrapped: 4
- Formation: 2 vehicles: DMS-DMSL
- Diagram: DMS vehicles: DP228; DMSL vehicles: DP229
- Fleet numbers: Units: 141001–141020 (later 141101–141120); Vehicles: DMS: 55502–55521; DMSL: 55522–55541
- Capacity: 94 seats
- Operators: British Rail; Islamic Republic of Iran Railways
- Depot: Neville Hill (Leeds)

Specifications
- Car body construction: Steel
- Car length: 15.123 m (49 ft 7.4 in)
- Width: Over body: 2.500 m (8 ft 2.4 in); Over treadplates: 2.744 m (9 ft 0 in)
- Height: 3.906 m (12 ft 9.8 in)
- Doors: Double-leaf bi-fold(one per side per car)
- Wheelbase: 9.000 m (29 ft 6.3 in)
- Maximum speed: 75 mph (121 km/h)
- Weight: DMS vehicles: 26 t (26 long tons; 29 short tons); DMSL vehicles: 26.5 t (26.1 long tons; 29.2 short tons)
- Prime mover: 2 × Leyland TL11 (one per vehicle)
- Engine type: Inline-6 4-stroke turbo-diesel
- Displacement: 11.1 L (680 cu in) per engine
- Power output: 149 kW (200 hp) per engine
- Transmission: SCG RRE5 (4-sp. epicyclic)
- Minimum turning radius: 70 m (230 ft)
- Braking systems: Electro-pneumatic (tread) ('Westcode')
- Safety system: AWS
- Coupling system: As built: Tightlock; Later: BSI
- Multiple working: As built: Not fitted
- Track gauge: 1,435 mm (4 ft 8 1/2 in) standard gauge

The British Rail Class 141 is the first production model of the Pacer diesel multiple unit (DMU) railbus.

During the 1980s, British Rail (BR) was interested in replacing its first generation diesel multiple units, particularly in the use of railbuses to service its lightly used branch lines. It was decided to develop such a vehicle with a high level of commonality with the widely used Leyland National bus, leading to its modular design serving as the basis for the design. Several single and two-car prototypes were constructed and evaluated, before an order was placed with British Leyland for 20 two-car Class 141 units during 1984. During their operating lives, the units were tasked with various passenger services in Yorkshire for 13 years. Following withdrawal, a large proportion of the units were exported to Iran where they operated for a further eight years, giving the Class 141 a total lifespan of 21 years.

== Background ==
By the beginning of the 1980s, British Rail (BR) operated a large fleet of first generation DMUs, which had been constructed in prior decades to various designs. While formulating its long-term strategy for this sector of its operations, British Rail planners recognised that there would be considerable costs incurred by undertaking refurbishment programmes necessary for the continued use of these ageing multiple units, particularly due to the necessity of handling and removing hazardous materials such as asbestos. In light of the high costs involved in retention, planners examined the prospects for the development and introduction of a new generation of DMUs to succeed the first generation.

In the concept stage, two separate approaches were devised, one involving a so-called railbus that prioritised the minimisation of both initial (procurement) and ongoing (maintenance & operational) costs, while the second was a more substantial DMU that could deliver superior performance than the existing fleet, particularly when it came to long-distance services. While the more ambitious latter requirement would ultimately lead to the development of the Class 150 and the wider Sprinter family of DMUs, BR officials recognised that a cheaper unit was desirable for service on the smaller branch lines that would not be unduly impacted by lower performance specs or a high density configuration. As such, work to progress both approaches was undertaken by BR's research department during the early 1980s.

During this period, a number of prototypes were constructed to explore different designs and approaches for implementing the railbus concept. One such vehicle was a single two-car unit, designated as the Class 140, that was constructed between 1979 and 1981. This prototype was introduced with much fanfare during June 1981. Initial testing with the Class 140 uncovered several issues, such as difficulty detecting the type via track circuits, this was reliably resolved by swapping the material of the brake blocks from a composite to iron. Two less easily addressable drawbacks were the high level of noise generated during transit, particularly on older jointed rails, which was a consequence of the railbus's direct connection between the underframe and suspension with the body that transmitted impact forces across the body. It was also observed that the inclusion of strengthening members in the mass-produced bus body added significantly to the overall production cost, which eliminated much of the cost advantage that was the primarily goal of the type.

The Class 140 was viewed to be an overall success, and thus BR issued an order for an initial production model, designated Class 141, to British Leyland during 1984 with production commencing thereafter. In subsequent years, follow-on orders would be placed, but these would be for improved derivatives of the Class 141, these being the Class 142 and Class 143 respectively. Unlike these later siblings, the Class 141 had a noticeably narrower body, having equal width to that of the standard bus; subsequent production models expanded this to maximise internal volume.

== Design ==
The Class 141 shared a very high degree of similarity to the design of the Class 140, a factor that enabled the latter to act as a driving instruction unit and demonstrator for the former. However, these production types also differed in numerous places. One major area of change is the separation between the underframe and the body above by a flexible mounting in contrast to the prototype's integration of these two sections; there was also a reduction in the depth of the underframe for maintenance accessibility. Furthermore, in order to maximise cost savings, the manufacturers made use of road bus-standard electrical equipment, passenger fittings, and general cab layout wherever possible.

Both the bodies and underframes were designed for interchangeability, as had been specified by BR, having been assembled upon jigs. These were designed so that the entire body could be replaced during a mid-life refurbishment/reconstruction, and that the replacement body would not be limited to the exact same dimensions either. The underframe area, in addition to its structural role, accommodated all of the propulsion apparatus along with the majority of electrical gear.

As originally built, the traction arrangement of the Class 141 consisted of a Leyland TL11 200 hp (150 kW) engine, and a Self-Changing Gears mechanical automatic gearbox and final drive unit on each car driving only a single axle. This propulsion arrangement was in part taken from the Leyland National bus, as well as shared with the earlier Class 140 prototype. The controller for the automatic transmission was observed by BR engineers to be the cause of numerous operating failures and other reliability issues; this was allegedly due to defective relay logic and poor earthing; the issue was eventually resolved on the fleet by replacing the relay-based controller with an alternative that was microprocessor-based.

Both axles (one driving per coach at the inner end) were fitted directly to the chassis rather than being mounted on bogies, unlike traditional DMUs. This uncommon arrangement has been attributed with resulting in the Class 141 units possessing a relatively rough ride, especially when traversing jointed track or points. Their combatively poor ride quality has been said to be a major factor in the general unpopularity amongst passengers.

== Operations ==
=== Great Britain ===
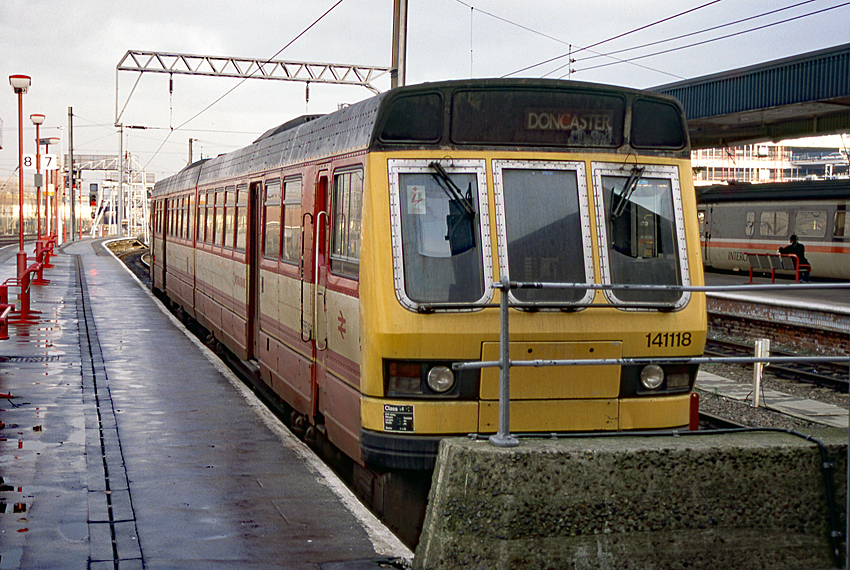
141118 2 car unit in West Yorkshire PTE Metro livery at Doncaster in 1994

The majority of the Class 141s were based in and across West Yorkshire on routes radiating from Leeds, where they worked up until 1997, at which point they were replaced by the improved Class 142. They were sponsored by West Yorkshire Passenger Transport Executive, and were painted in the PTE's Verona green and buttermilk livery with MetroTrain branding. 141001 was initially painted dark blue. The class later receiving the red and cream Metro-Train livery.

The units became notorious for unreliability in their early years, a factor which BR was aware of and made efforts to investigate the root causes. Beyond the pursuit of greater reliability, experiments were conducted into areas of enhancement such as ride comfort; one unit was refitted with a wider spring base and double dampers; both of these features were later deemed necessary to provide sufficient levels of performance and were applied to all Class 141s. Accordingly, considerable improvements across the whole fleet followed a modification programme performed by Hunslet-Barclay between 1988 and 1989. At the same time, the original buckeye couplings were replaced with the BSI type that was fitted to the later Class 142 to enable more flexible working.

The units were numbered from 141001 to 141020. After modification they became 141101 to 141120, although not in order, since the opportunity was taken to match the final digits of the unit numbers with those of the vehicle numbers.

=== Non-passenger use ===
During the 1990s, unit number 141118 was modified for use as a weedkilling unit by Serco. It gained a grey and red livery and black wrap-around window surrounds. It was among the units that were later exported to Iran. A photograph of this unit, in Serco livery, at Huddersfield is shown on page 36 of Modern Locomotives Illustrated - August/September 2012.

=== Overseas ===
During 1984, a single Class 141 unit was constructed for trial running in Malaysia and Thailand. Amongst other changes, the unit was re-gauged to metre gauge, and was different from the 20 British trains having only longitudinal seating for 120 passengers and space for another 140 standing. Furthermore, only one car was powered, with the other being a trailer vehicle. While the trial was conducted, it did not lead to export orders for the type. After the unsuccessful trial in Thailand, the Pacer demonstrator was transported onto Malaysia and then to Indonesia for further evaluation runs. It was seen outside the Ulu Yam station in Malaysia, on a railway siding, in relatively derelict condition in 2000.

Following the end of their career with British Rail, 12 Class 141s were sold to Islamic Republic of Iran Railways and were exported during 2001/2002. with two spotted in service in 2005, All units have since been withdrawn and replaced by new DMUs. Two units (106 & 112) were exported to the Netherlands, but these were both scrapped during 2005. Only a handful of units have remained in the United Kingdom, of which two units are in preservation: 141108 at the Colne Valley Railway, and 141113 (the only 141 to have been re-engineered with Cummins LTA10R engines and Voith hydraulic transmissions like the 142s/143s/144s) at the Midland Railway – Butterley. Two units (141103 and 141110) were formerly preserved at the Weardale Railway, of which 141103 and the one remaining car from 141110 were scrapped in March 2018.
