= BlueScope =

Australian steel producer

- Formerly: BHP Steel
- Traded as: ASX: BSL
- Industry: Steel
- Founded: 15 July 2002
- Founder: BHP
- Headquarters: Melbourne, Victoria, Level 24, 181 William Street, Melbourne, Australia
- Area served: Asia; Australia; New Zealand; North America
- Key people: Jane McAloon (Chair); Tania Archibald (CEO)
- Products: Steel
- Revenue: $12.9 billion (2021)
- Operating income: 1.34 Billion (2024)
- Net income: $806 million (2024)
- Number of employees: 16,500 (2024)
- Subsidiaries: New Zealand Steel; Orrcon Steel
- Website: www.bluescope.com

BlueScope Steel Limited is an Australian flat product steel producer that was spun-off from BHP Billiton in 2002.

== History ==
BlueScope was formed when BHP Billiton spun-off its steel assets on 15 July 2002 as BHP Steel. It was renamed BlueScope on 17 November 2003.

Early in 2004, BlueScope merged with the American firm Butler Manufacturing. Such a merger was considered a strategic move for both companies as they were similar in character and non-overlapping in the markets they operated in, such that acquisition of Butler, based in Kansas City, Missouri, would provide BlueScope with access to United States and Chinese markets. Butler was founded in 1901, operated in sixteen countries and focused on non-residential building and building component construction. At the time of the merger, Butler had a dozen production facilities across the United States, China and Mexico.

In 2007, the company acquired four companies consisting of most of the United States holdings of the Argentinian firm Ternium, those being Steelscape, ASC Profiles, Varco Pruden Buildings; and Metl-Span, which was acquired by NCI Building Systems in 2012. The four companies had been held by the Mexican Grupo IMSA prior to their purchase by Ternium. Steelscape originated in 1996 as BHP Coated Steel and was originally owned by BlueScope.

In March 2012, a new coated steel manufacturing plant was inaugurated in Jamshedpur, India.

In February 2014, BlueScope purchased Orrcon Steel from Hills. Its products included RHS, SHS and CHS structural tubular steel, hot-rolled structural steel and fencing, roofing and building accessories.

Because of lower energy prices in the United States than in Australia, BlueScope in 2019 decided to expand its investment in America by $1 billion.

== Operations ==
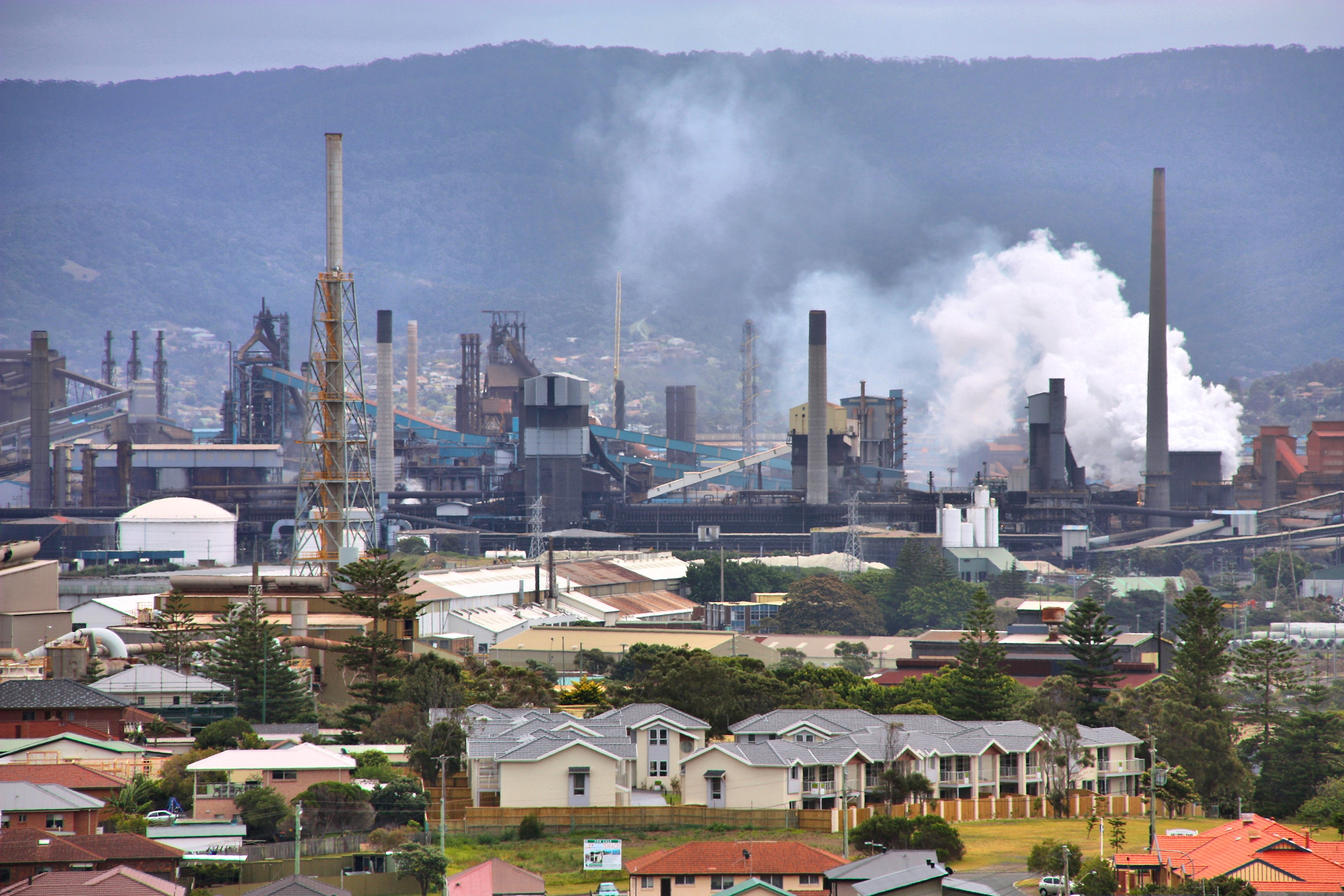
Port Kembla steelworks

The corporate headquarters are located at Level 24, 181 William Street, Melbourne.

The company has 16,000 personnel. Its largest operating plant, an integrated steelworks, is located at Port Kembla, New South Wales. In October 2011, No.6 Blast furnace, one of two at Port Kembla, was shut down, reducing the plant's production capacity by 50% after the company decided to exit the export market.

Major products include steel slab, hot rolled coil, steel plate, automotive steel, galvanised steel, corrugated galvanised iron, Zincalume brand (55% aluminium, 43.5% zinc, 1.5% silicon) coated steel, and Colorbond brand pre-painted steel. Tinplate production ceased in March 2007.

Orrcon Steel supplies steel, tube and pipe to steel fabricators, furniture and trailer body manufacturers, housing and construction companies and pipeline and infrastructure engineering firms.

It has distribution centres in Melbourne, Sydney, Brisbane, Perth and Adelaide.

== Controversy ==
In August 2019, the Australian Competition & Consumer Commission launched a civil case against BlueScope and its former general manager of sales and marketing Jason Ellis for engaging in cartel conduct, alleging that they tried to induce competitors to enter contracts to fix prices for flat steel products between 2013 and 2014. BlueScope denied the allegations, stating "we do not believe that BlueScope, or any current or former employees, have engaged in cartel conduct". In December 2020, Ellis was sentenced to eight months imprisonment and fined $10,000 after pleading guilty to obstructing the investigation, inciting two employees to give false information. In December 2022 the Australian Federal Court found that BlueScope and Ellis had attempted to induce eight steel distributors in Australia and an overseas manufacturer to enter agreements to fix and/or raise the level of pricing for flat steel products. BlueScope was ordered to pay a $57.5 million penalty, the highest penalty ever imposed for cartel conduct in Australia.

On 6 May 2020, a 59-year-old man was killed at BlueScope's Port Kembla facility after becoming trapped between a car and a crane on a wharf, resulting in the wharf being temporarily shut.

On 14 May 2020, BlueScope was the subject of a cyberattack that forced its production systems to be temporarily halted company-wide after ransomware was discovered in one of its systems.

In July 2020, BlueScope was fined $30,000 by the New South Wales Environment Protection Authority for failing to comply with dioxin air emission limits on six occasions between March and April 2020. In response, BlueScope completed air emissions modelling and engaged an independent consultant to undertake a health assessment of the elevated emissions.

== Major manufacturing facilities ==
- Port Kembla, New South Wales
- Western Port in Hastings, Victoria
- New Zealand Steel, Glenbrook
- Orrcon Brisbane Mill, Salisbury, Queensland
- Orrcon Precision Tubing Mill, Adelaide, South Australia

Finished products are transported around Australia by rail freight operator Pacific National. In February 2007 Pacific National secured Australia's largest ever rail freight contract ($1 billion) with BlueScope Steel and OneSteel, to carry approximately three million tonnes of steel product each year for seven years. The contract was renewed for a further seven years from January 2015. In January 2022, Qube Holdings and SCT Logistics will take over from Pacific National.
