= Hills Limited =

Australian business

- Formerly: Hills Holdings; Hills Industries
- Type: Public
- Traded as: ASX: HIL
- Founded: 1948
- Founder: Lance Hill; Harold Ling
- Headquarters: Sydney, Australia
- Key people: David Chambers (Chairman); David Clarke (CEO
- Revenue: $47 million (2022)
- Operating income: $24 million (2022)
- Net income: ($9 million) (2022)
- Parent: Ames Australasia
- Website: www.hills.com.au

Hills Limited was a publicly listed industrial conglomerate company with branches across Australia and New Zealand. Hills is the evolution of Hills Hoist, the company founded by Lance Hill and Harold Ling in 1948 to manufacture the Hills Hoist clothesline. Hills was a value-added distributor of security and surveillance systems, IT infrastructure, nurse call and patient engagement technology. In 2023, Hills entered voluntary administration.

The origin of Hills Limited dates back to 1945, when Lance Hill copied the design of a rotary clothesline first invented and patented by Gilbert Toyne in 1925 Hills Hoist. Together with his brother-in-law, Harold Ling, Hill manufactured the clothes lines in his backyard in Glenunga, South Australia, before moving production to a nearby factory. Hills Hoists Limited was formed in January 1948, with Hill as chairman and Ling as a director and by 1954, the factory had relocated to a larger site and was producing six hundred hoists a week and supplying branches throughout Australia.

In 1956, Hill retired due to ill-health, and Ling took over as chairman. During the 1950s, Hills Hoists expanded its business into New Zealand and the United Kingdom, opening a factory in Auckland in 1958 and in Caerphilly, Wales in 1959. Simultaneously, the factory in Australia was diversifying into the production of other metal products, such as playground swings and folding chairs. In particular, Hills was pioneering the development of the television antenna, so that by 1957 Hills Hoists was Australia’s largest manufacturer of rotary clothes lines and one of the largest producers of television antennas. In 1958, Hills Hoists became a public company, Hills Industries Limited, and in the following years, entered into the TV service market, providing antennas, their installation and connection.

In 1967, Hills Industries opened its first purpose built metal tubing factory at Sullivan Beach in South Australia, and in 1969, acquired automotive component manufacturer Hitchin & Hallett, and began to produce automotive exhaust systems.

Throughout the 1970s, Hills kept pace with the rapid social and market changes of the era, expanding its range of consumer products, including children’s play equipment and homewares. By 1971, Hills had taken a leading position in the specialist TV market, as one of the few companies capable of handling both master and community antenna systems, and by 1985, Hills was the industry leader in TV antenna sales and technology, exporting its product to South East Asia and the Middle East.

In the late 1970s, Hilquip bodied 10 Leyland B21 and five Mercedes-Benz O305 buses for the Metropolitan Transport Trust from a factory in Balcatta, Perth. It collapsed in 1980.

During the 1980s and 1990s, Hills divested itself of its automotive components business, but continued to diversify its portfolio. In 1986, Hills bought 46% of Korvest, a manufacturer of cable and pipe supports, and in 1987 acquired Direct Alarm Supplies, embarking on a new focus on security and surveillance.

By 2000, Hills had consolidated its business into three industry segments focusing on electronics, home and hardware and building and industrial. Steel tubing had been the mainstay of Hills’ growth as a manufacturer, but in order to compete with large multi-nationals, the business was sold into a joint venture with Welded Tube Mills of Australia to form Orrcon Steel. In 2002, Hills sold 50% of its UK business to form a partnership with Freudenberg Household Products, manufacturers of the Vileda brand, to facilitate sales throughout Europe. In Australia, the K.Care group and Kerry Equipment (health care equipment brands) were acquired, as Hills capitalised on the growth in the aged care sector.

By 2004, Hills had refined it business segments to electronic security and entertainment, home and hardware and building and industrial, signalling a focus on the provision of integrated entertainment, security and communications systems. In 2006, Hills sold its remaining investment in Hills United Kingdom to Freudenberg Household Products, ending its venture into the European market. With the acquisition of Air Comfort Seating Systems in 2007, to complement the K-Care and Kerry Equipment range, Hills Healthcare was launched and quickly became the leading manufacturer of rehabilitation, mobility and hospital equipment in Australia.

In 2010, Hills Industries Limited changed its company name to Hills Holdings Limited, to reflect its transition from an industrial company to a diversified investment company, and in 2012, embarked on a major restructure to transform from a low margin, capital intensive manufacturer to a distributor of integrated technology products and services. In December 2013, the company changed its name from Hills Holdings Limited to Hills Limited and divested itself of industrial assets including Korvest and Orrcon, as well as its healthcare businesses to focus on opportunities in technology and communications. After two years of having licensed the sale of its Hills Home Living brands to Woolworths, Hills Limited sold the manufacturing and sale rights of those brands to Ames Australasia, a subsidiary of the American Griffon Corporation.

In August 2013, Orrcon Steel was sold to BlueScope.
