= Chase Coaches =

English bus company

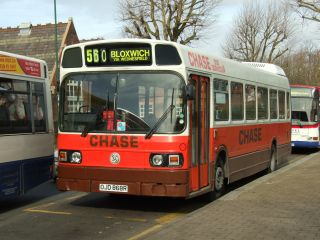
- Leyland National in Bloxwich in May 2007
- Parent: Graham Dodd
- Ceased operation: 28 April 2007
- Headquarters: Chasetown
- Service area: Black Country
- Service type: Bus operator
- Fleet: 27 (April 2007)

Chase Coaches was a bus company operating in the Black Country.

== History ==
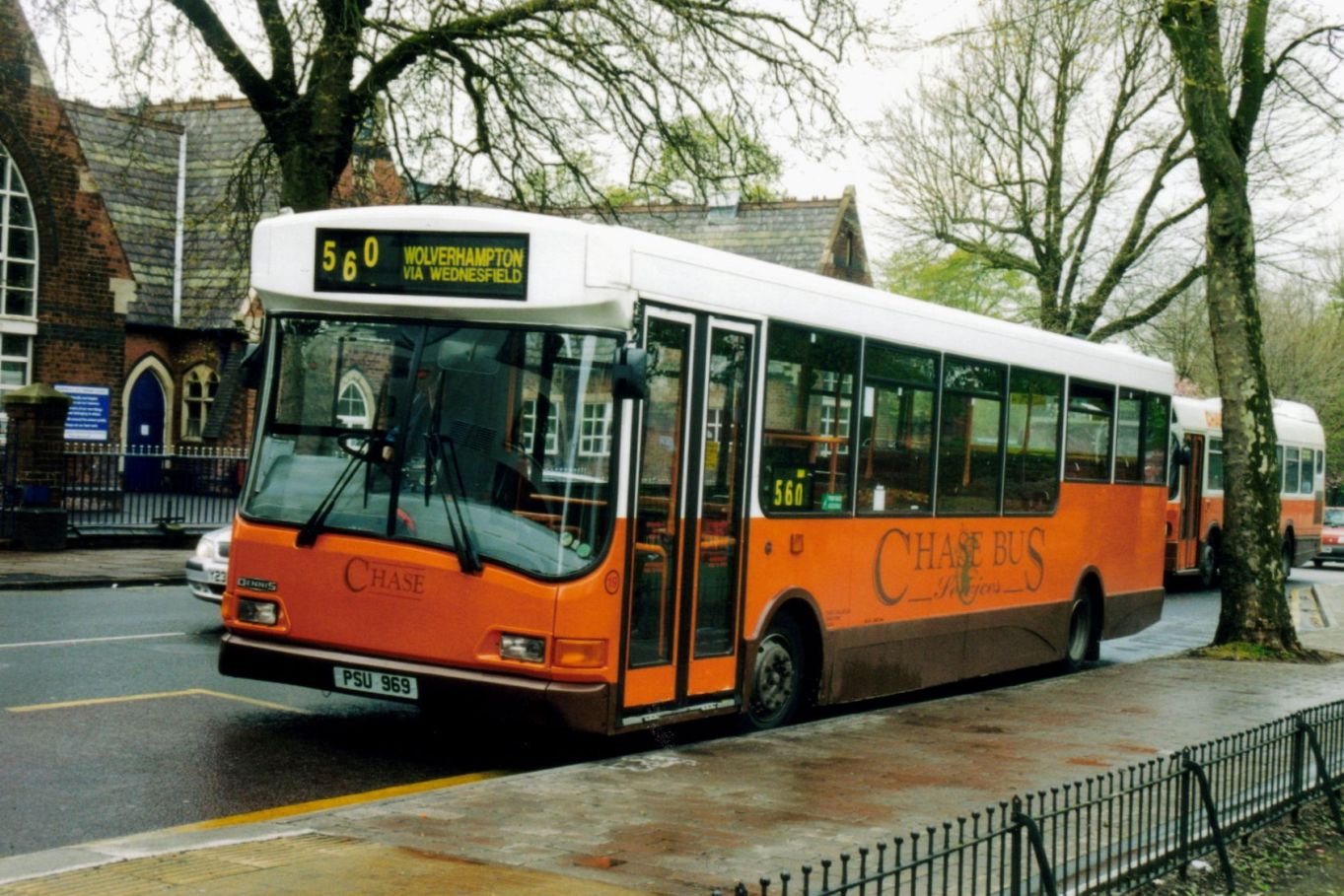
UVG Urbanstar bodied Dennis Dart SLF in Bloxwich in March 2003

Chase Coaches was established when Graham Dodd purchased the business of Churchbridge Luxury Coaches. Following deregulation in 1986, bus operations commenced. The livery of white, orange and brown was adopted after the purchase of some former Greater Manchester Passenger Transport Executive Leyland National buses. The original fleet livery was off-white with prussian blue relief.

On 25 February 2007, the business was purchased by Arriva Midlands with 27 buses and 40 employees.

At the time of the sale, the majority of the fleet were Leyland Nationals, but also included one Ikarus Citibus bodied DAF SB220 and three UVG Urbanstar bodied Dennis Dart SLFs. All the buses apart from the Ikarus and three Darts were sold at auction. The DAF and one of the Darts moved to Shrewsbury depot, with Cannock garage using the other two Darts.

Arriva Midlands operated a Leyland National day on 28 April 2007 to commemorate the end of Leyland National operations which took in a majority of the routes operated. The last day services included an additional two Leyland Nationals duplicating the scheduled services. However, six Nationals were retained for a further month due to a lack of vehicles.

== Fleet ==
The first service buses were East Lancs bodied Leyland Leopards. These were used on works services from around 1983 and moving onto bus services in 1986. Further Leyland Leopards once operated by Midland Red North were added to the fleet in 1987, but Leyland Nationals eventually became the standard bus type. At one stage three Eastern Coach Works bodied Bristol RE buses were operated. In the early days of bus service operation around 1987 coaches would sometimes be used on bus services, for example AEC Reliances and Bristol LHSs. It operated services in Walsall, Cannock and Brownhills.

Chase operated the UKs largest fleet of secondhand Leyland Nationals. The fleets orange/white/brown livery came from early purchase of former Greater Manchester Passenger Transport Executive and was applied to the additional Nationals acquired from London Transport in both single and dual door formats. They operated both 10.3 and 11.3m models in a range of interior configurations from standard vinyl B52F, through dual door high standing capacity to dual purpose coach seated interurban versions from National Bus Company subsidiary Crosville. Chase also acquired a number of lightweight Leyland National 'B' models minus the roof pods that proved equally capable alongside their podded sisters.

Chase also lead the way in uprating and re-engine programs utilising the existing semi-automatic gearbox with a Leyland O.680 engines and the unusual, though highly effective, THX160S and its truck engine (clarification needed on type).

Chase embraced the low floor revolution my acquiring a single Ikarus Citibus bodied DAF SB220 and three UVG Urbanstar bodied Dennis Dart SLFs. They also made efforts to reconfigure interiors of Leyland Nationals by removing the entrance poles and adding grab handles either side of the doors.
