= Transport in the Northern Territory =

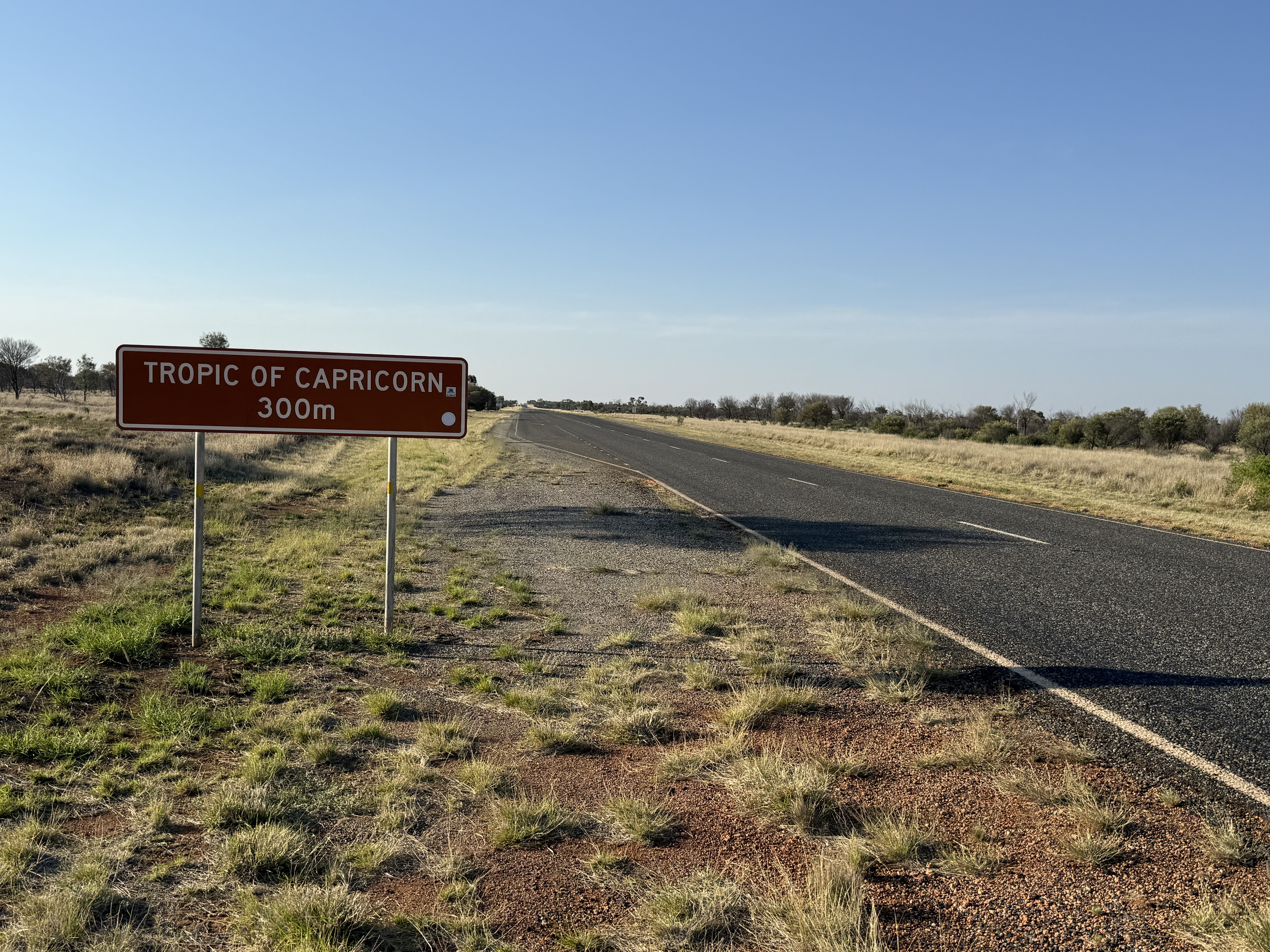
The Stuart Highway in the outback Northern Territory, close to the Tropic of Capricorn.

The Australian territory of Northern Territory (NT) has a complex multimodal transport network. Due to its sparse population and the distance between towns, the territory mainly relies on road trains and freight trains for the transportation of goods, but also has air freight services. A big portion of the roads in the Northern Territory are managed by the Northern Territory Government, however some roads in cities are managed by the local council or under private management.

== Road transport ==
The Northern Territory has a network of roads that connect its inner cities and townships, including the towns of Darwin, Alice Springs and Katherine. These roads are primarily managed by the Northern Territory Government, but some are also managed by the Local Government Association Northern Territory and by individual city councils. These roads are crucial, as it is one of the only ways that remote towns in the Northern Territory are connected.

Major roads in the Northern Territory include the Stuart Highway, which connects the territory with South Australia, the Victoria Highway, which connects it with Western Australia and the Barkly Highway, which connects it with Queensland.

The Northern Territory road network is over 36,000 kilometres (22,000 mi) long and has more than 220 managed bridges.

=== Buses ===
The first bus service in the Northern Territory commenced in 1949 at Darwin and was served by Leyland B21s and AEC Reliances.

== Air transport ==
The main airport in the Northern Territory is Darwin International Airport, which serves the city of Darwin and nearby regional towns. Flight routes are offered to all other state capitals in Australia, with the exception of Hobart, and also regional towns such as Alice Springs and Katherine. Limited international flights are available, offered to only 3 destinations, Dili, Denpasar and Singapore, offered by Jetstar, Qantas and Singapore Airlines respectively.

The second largest airport in Northern Territory is Alice Springs Airport, which serves the nearby town of Alice Springs. Various other regional airports exist to serve regional towns.
