= Jamaica Omnibus Service =

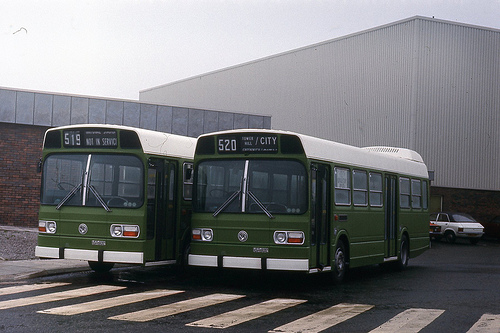
JOS Leyland National (N) buses in the UK awaiting shipment to Kingston.

The Jamaica Omnibus Service (JOS), operated a municipal bus service for the Kingston Metropolitan Area, from 1953 until it was wound up in 1983.

== Public transport before the Omnibus Service ==
Kingston's first form of public transport was a mule-drawn tram system, which began operating in 1872. In June 1898, the existing mule car service in Kingston was phased out and a transition to electric trams, initially operated by the West India Electric Company, and latterly by the Jamaica Public Service Company. This transition to the electric tram was completed on March 31, 1899. This tram service continued to operate, but the inflexibility of a tram service could not keep pace with a growing city, and the tram service ceased on August 7, 1948.

Kingston's first bus service operated by a company called Jamaica Utilities commenced on August 8, 1948. Initially communities served included, Rockfort, Hagley Park, Mountain View and Three Miles. The service operated by Jamaica Utilities was unsatisfactory, mainly due to the poor condition in which the fleet was maintained. Efforts to get overseas professional advisers was rejected by the House of Representatives as were efforts to get financial support from government.

The government eventually revoked the franchise of Jamaica Utilities, paving the way for the takeover of bus service in Kingston by the Jamaica Omnibus Service (JOS) on December 15, 1953.

== Inception and replacement ==
The Jamaica Omnibus Service was originally formed by three British companies in 1953: British Electric Traction, Close Brothers, and United Transport. JOS was nationalised by the government of Jamaica in 1974.

The JOS was replaced by a hodgepodge system of private operator owned buses, and franchisees, which provided very unreliable and unstructured services and was very unpopular with the public. In 1998, the Jamaica Urban Transit Company (JUTC) was established and continues operations presently.

== Fleet and infrastructure ==
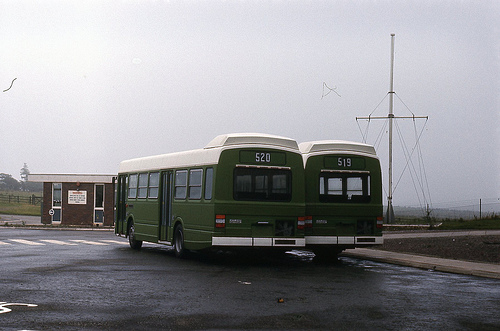
Rear view of JOS (N) buses, introduced in the 1970s.

The JOS inherited a very dilapidated depot and bus infrastructure from Jamaica Utilities, and the JOS gradually built new facilities, including a depot at Lyndhurst Road and upgraded the existing depot on Industrial Terrace. The JOS also refurbished the existing US built fleet with British built Leyland Engines. By the late 1970s the entire fleet consisted of various models of British built Leyland buses.

== Route network ==
At its peak, the JOS had a fleet of over 600 buses, and serviced an area ranging from Spanish Town and Portmore in St. Catherine in the western extremities of the Greater Kingston area, Border, Mt. Charles, Irish Town and Mavis Bank in north rural St. Andrew, Port Royal to the south, and Bull Bay (10 Miles) in east rural St. Andrew.

A partial listing of JOS routes;

Route Numbers	Origin to Outward Destination	via
1	City Centre to Harbour View West	Windward Road, Mineral Baths
2	City Centre to Harbour View East	Windward Road, Mineral Baths, Harbor View West
3	City Centre to Constant Spring	Cross Roads, Half Way Tree
5	City Centre to Cross Roads	Slipe Road
6	City Centre to August Town	Cross Roads, Matilda's Corner, Papine
8	City Centre to Waterhouse	Spanish Town Road, Three Miles
11	City Centre to Parks Road	Red Hills Road, Swain Spring, Cooper's Hill, Rock Hall
12	Barbican Place to Jack's Hill Village	Gayles House
14	City Centre to Barbican	Cross Roads, Lady Musgrave Road, Kings Gate
15	Cross Roads to Balmagie	Rousseau Road, Delacree Road, Waltham Gardens
16	City Centre to Jones Town	Slipe Pen Road, Studley Park Road
17	City Centre to Denham Town	Slipe Pen Road, Arnett Gardens
18	City Centre to Greenwich Town	Beckford Street, Darling Street, Spanish Town Road
20	Railway Station to Rollington Town	Rae Town, Passmore Town, Elleston Road
21	City Centre to Norman Gardens	Windward Road, Lucas Road
22	City Centre to Mona Heights	South Camp Road, Cross Roads, Matilda's Corner
23	City Centre to Fernandez Avenue	North Street, Franklin Town
24	City Centre to Rennock Lodge	Windward Road, Wareika Road
25	City Centre to Rockfort Commission Road	East Queen Street, Windward Road
26	City Centre to Eden Gardens	North Street, South Camp Road, Merrion Road, Deanery Road
27	City Centre to Half Way Tree	Windward Road, Mountain View Avenue, Trafalgar Road
28	City Centre to Vineyard Town (Lexington Avenue)	North Street, South Camp Road, Merrion Road, Deanery Road
29	City Centre to Papine	Windward Road, Mountain View Avenue, Old Hope Road, Matilda's Corner
30	City Centre to Golden Spring	Cross Roads, Constant Spring, Red Gal Ring, Stony Hill
31	Constant Spring to Border	Old Stony Hill Road, Golden Spring, Lawrence Tavern
32	Constant Spring to Parks Road	Red Gal Ring, Stony Hill, Cavaliers, Salisbury Plain
33	City Centre to Rock Hall	Cross Roads, Red Hills Road, Forrest Hills, Red Hills
34	Constant Spring to Mt. Pleasant	Diamond Road, Golden Spring, Mt. Airy
35	City Centre to Havendale	Red Hills Road, Whitehall Avenue, Mannings Hill Road
36	City Centre to Norbrook	Cross Roads, Half Way Tree, Camperdown, Shortwood Road
37	City Centre to Meadowbrook	Cross Roads, Half Way Tree, Dunrobin Avenue, Red Hills Road
38	Cross Roads to Havendale (Michigan Close)	New Kingston, Mannings Hill Road
39	Cross Roads to Meadowbrook Estate	Dunrobin Avenue, Bakery Gates
40	City Centre to Pembroke Hall	Spanish Town Road, Waltham Park Road, Molynes Road
43	City Centre to Valentine Gardens	Lyndhurst Road, Half Way Tree, Arlene Gardens
51	City Centre to Cross Roads	South Camp Road, Camp Road
52	City Centre to Omara Road	Spanish Town Road, Maxfield Avenue
53	City Centre to Richmond Park	Spanish Town Road, Maxfield Avenue
54	City Centre to Barbican	Spanish Town Road, Half Way Tree, West Kings House Road
55	Cross Roads (Circular)	Brentford Road, Caledonia Crescent, South Camp Road
60	City Centre to Gordon Town	Cross Roads, Matilda's Corner, Papine
61	Papine to Redlight	Cooperage, Irish Town
62	Papine to Mt. Charles	Gordon Town, Mavis Bank
65	City Centre to August Town	Cross Roads, Matilda's Corner, Mona Road
67	Cross Roads to Hope Pastures	Arthur Wint Drive, Rosevelt Avenue, Hopefield Avenue
70	City Centre to Papine via Three Miles	Spanish Town Road, Three Miles, Half Way Tree
X77	East/North Parades (Circular)	Windward Road, Mountain View Avenue, Mona Road, August Town, Papine, Old Hope Road, Half Way Tree, Dunrobin Avenue, Washington Boulevard, Patrick City, Marcus Garvey Drive
X80	City Centre to Spanish Town	Beckford Street, East Avenue, Free Zone, Edgewater, Independence City, Gregory Park,
X81	City Centre to Spanish Town	Beckford Street, East Avenue, Free Zone, Independence City, Naggo Head
X82	City Centre to Gregory Park	Beckford Street, East Avenue, Free Zone, Fort Agusta, Independence City
X83	City Centre to Bayside Centre	Beckford Street, East Avenue, Free Zone, Fort Agusta, Independence City
X84	City Centre to Waterford	Beckford Street, East Avenue, Free Zone, Fort Agusta, Causeway
X85	City Centre to Naggo Head	Beckford Street, East Avenue, Free Zone, Independence City
X86	City Centre to Spanish Town	Spanish Town Road, Marcus Garvey Drive
91	City Centre to Duhaney Park	Three Miles, Four Miles, Weymouth Drive
92	City Centre to Patrick City	Spanish Town Road, Weymouth Drive
93	City Centre to Six Miles	Cross Roads, Half Way Tree, Washington Boulevard
94	Cross Roads to Washington Gardens	Half Way Tree, Washington Boulevard
95	Cross Roads to Duhaney Park	Half Way Tree, Washington Boulevard
X97	City Centre to Norman Manley Airport	Windward Road, Harbour Head, Palisadoes Road
X98	City Centre to Bull Bay	Windward Road, Harbour Head, Seven Miles
X99	City Centre to Port Royal	Windward Road, Harbour Head, Palisadoes Road, Norman Manley Airport
