= Orrcon Steel =

- Type: Steel, tube and pipe manufacturer and distributor
- Industry: Steel, steel manufacturer and distributor
- Founded: October 2000
- Founder: Hills Industries; Welded Tube Mills Australia
- Headquarters: 121 Evans Road, Salisbury, Brisbane, Australia
- Products: Steel, tube, pipe and hot-rolled structural steel
- Owner: BlueScope
- Number of employees: 500+
- Website: www.orrconsteel.com.au

Orrcon Steel is an Australian distributor and manufacturer of steel, tube and pipe. It is an Australian distributor and manufacturer of steel, tube and pipe. It is a subsidiary of BlueScope.

== History ==
Orrcon Steel was formed from the merger of Hills Industries' tubing division and Welded Tube Mills in October 2000.

In February 2005, Hills Holdings acquired 100% of Orrcon Steel. In 2007 Orrcon Steel acquired the Impressive Group from Western Australia. In 2010 Orrcon Steel added the SteelBarn business which included the acquisition of five branches in Queensland.

In August 2013, BlueScope acquired Orrcon from Hills Industries.

== Products ==
Structural steel Electric Resistance Welding (ERW) carbon steel structural tubulars. Structural products are used in applications from building structures to sporting arenas, major mining and industry infrastructure and for aesthetic structural use for airports and shipping terminals.

Precision tube Square, rectangular, round and oval precision tube.

Hot-rolled structural steel Universal beams, universal columns, parallel flange channels, angles and merchant bar (including flats, angles and rounds) as well as a broad range of plate from 3 mm up to 200 mm.

Pipelines Line pipe procurement and logistics services.

== Sponsorships ==
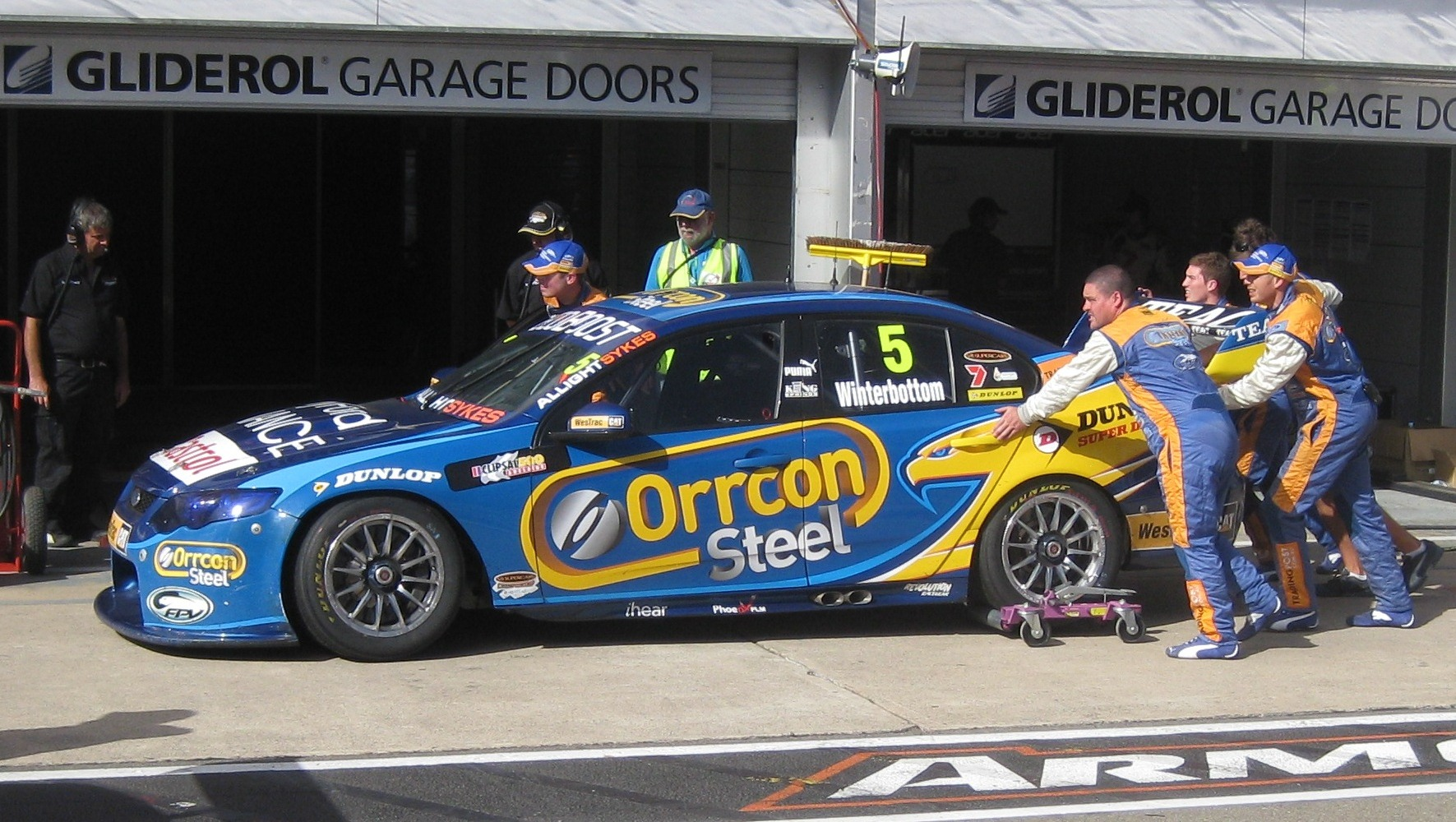
Ford Performance Racing Ford Falcon FG in 2012

Orrcon Steel was naming rights sponsor of Supercars Championship teams Larkham Motorsport, WPS Racing and Ford Performance Racing from 2003 until 2012.
