= Corrugated galvanised iron =

Type of building material

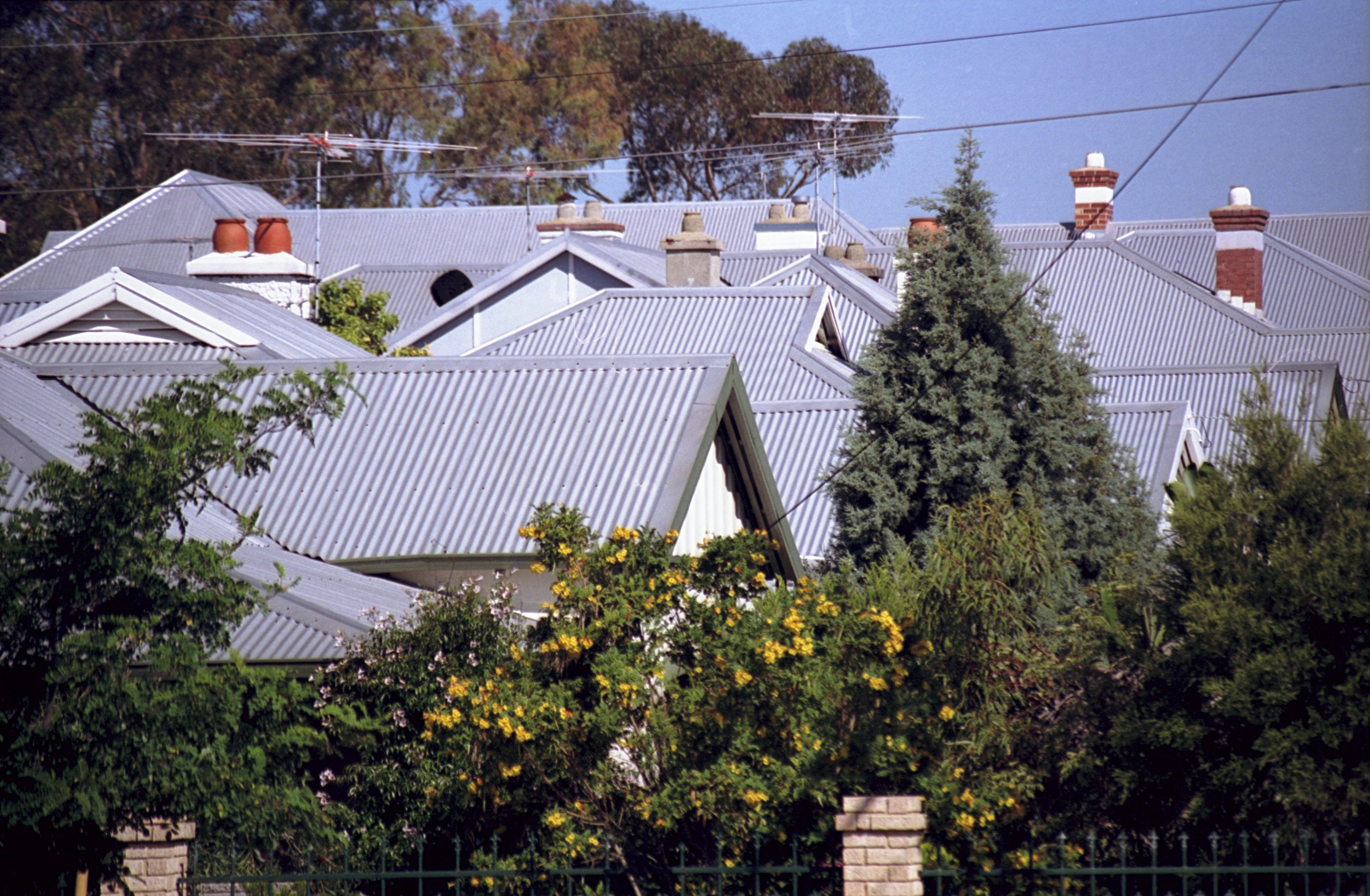
Corrugated galvanised iron roofing in Mount Lawley, Western Australia

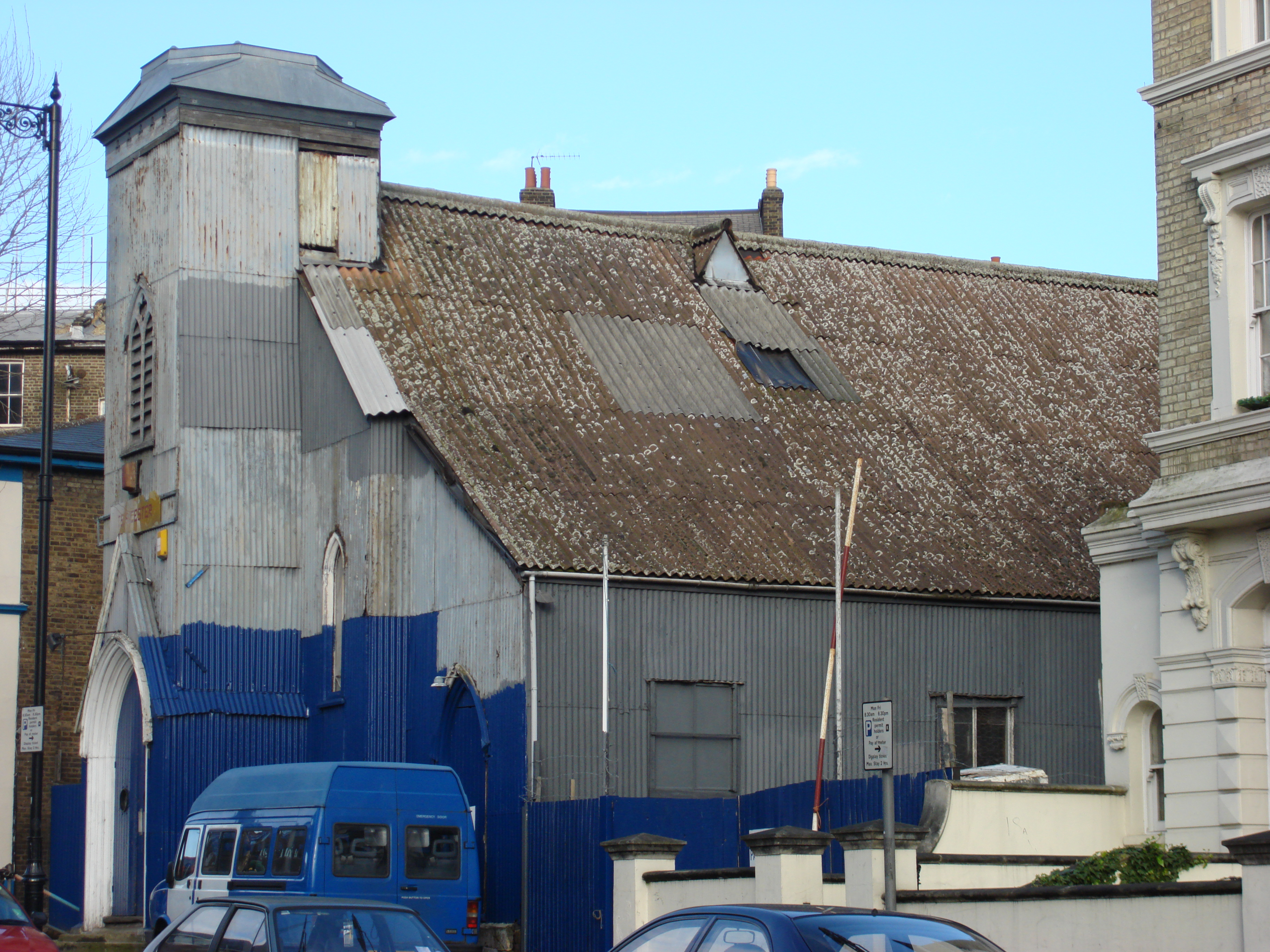
A corrugated iron church (or tin tabernacle) in Kilburn, London

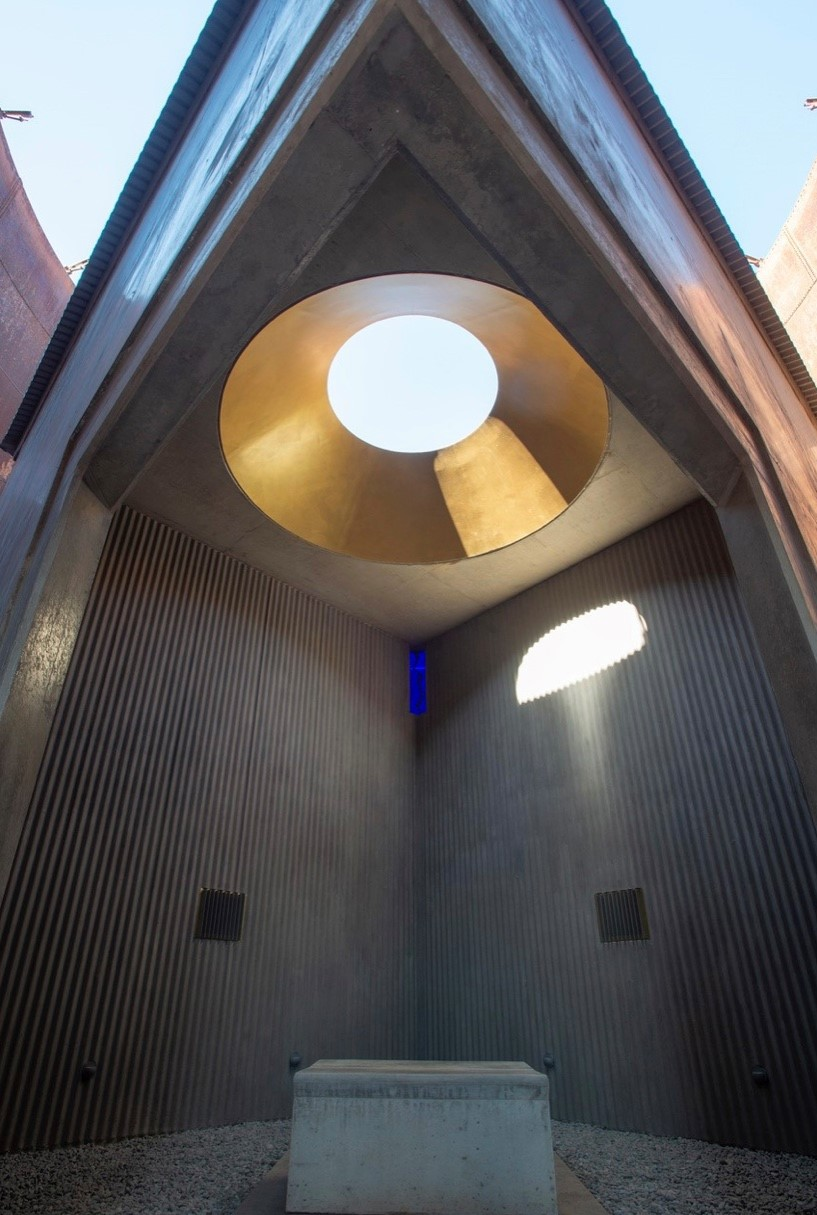
Corrugated iron in the Cobar Sound Chapel, used both for the roof and as the formwork for the concrete interior

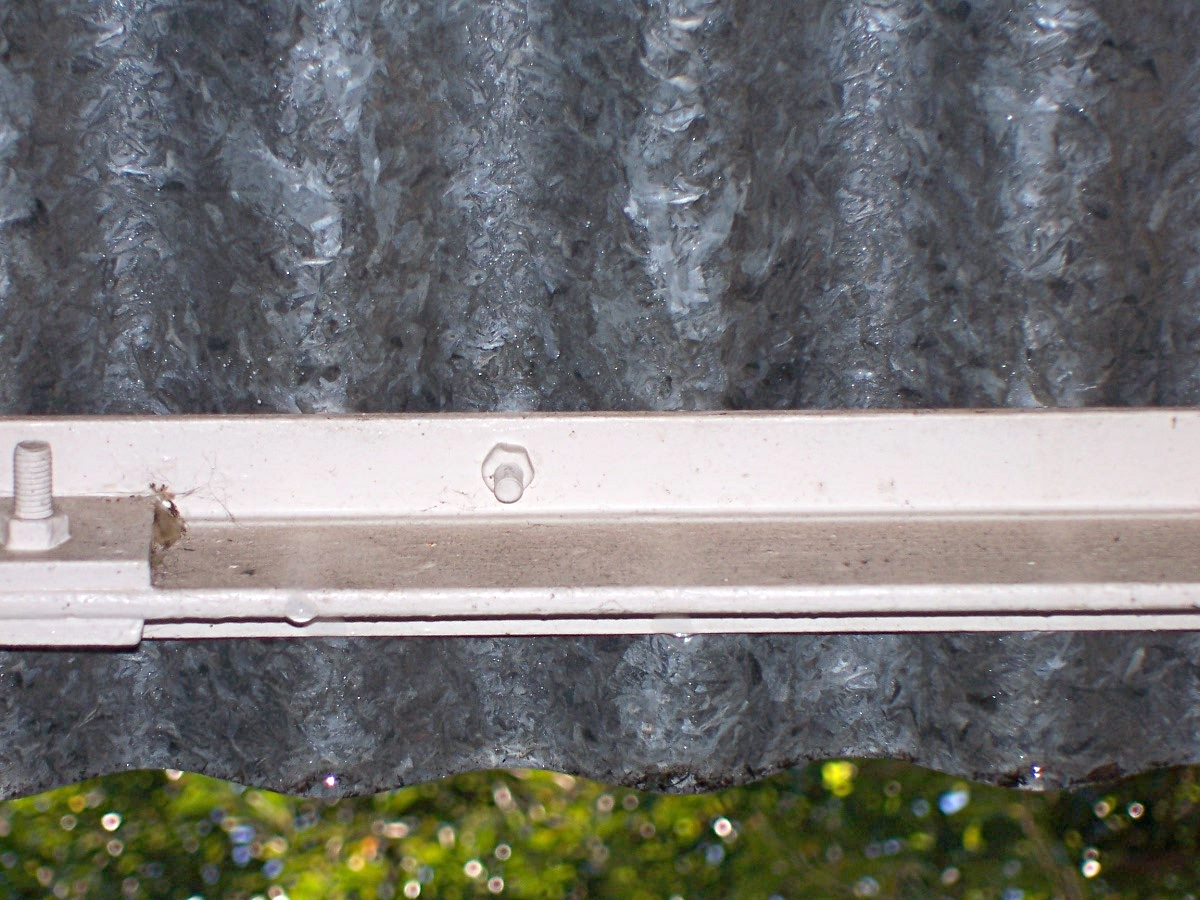
Typical corrugated galvanised iron appearance, with visible large flake type patterns. The galvanised sheet is viewed from below and is supported by a piece of angle iron (painted white).

Corrugated galvanised iron (CGI) or steel, colloquially corrugated iron (near universal), wriggly tin (taken from UK military slang), pailing (in Caribbean English), corrugated sheet metal (in North America), zinc (in Cyprus and Nigeria) or custom orb / corro sheet (Australia), is a building material composed of sheets of hot-dip galvanised mild steel, cold-rolled to produce a linear ridged pattern in them. Although it is still popularly called "iron" in the UK, the material used is actually steel (which is iron alloyed with carbon for strength, commonly 0.3% carbon), and only the surviving vintage sheets may actually be made up of 100% iron. The corrugations increase the bending strength of the sheet in the direction perpendicular to the corrugations, but not parallel to them, because the steel must be stretched to bend perpendicular to the corrugations. Normally each sheet is manufactured longer in its strong direction.

CGI is lightweight and easily transported. It was and still is widely used especially in rural and military buildings such as sheds and water tanks. Its unique properties were used in the development of countries such as Australia from the 1840s, and it is still helping developing countries today.

== History ==
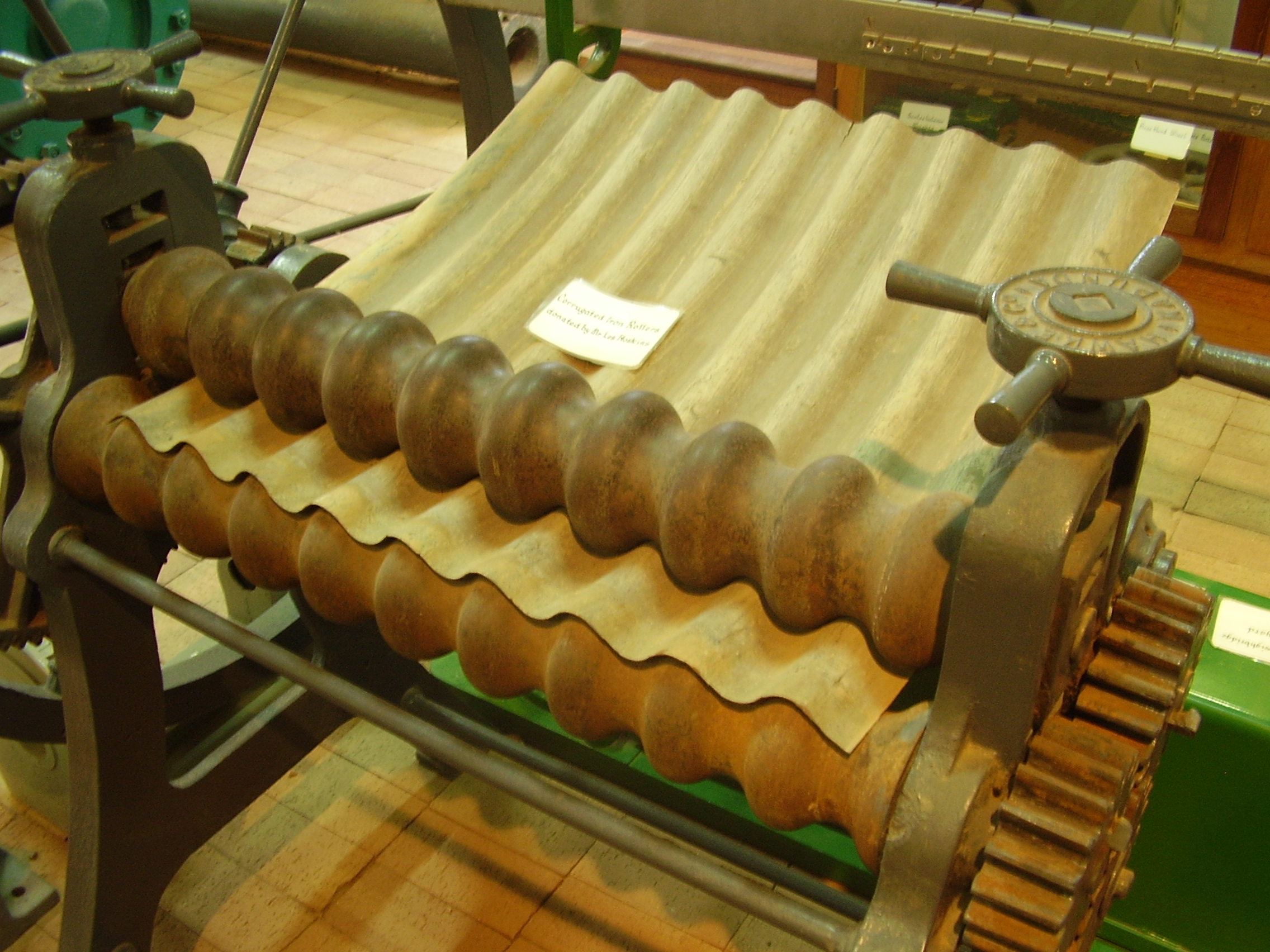
Early manual corrugated iron roller. On display at Kapunda museum, South Australia

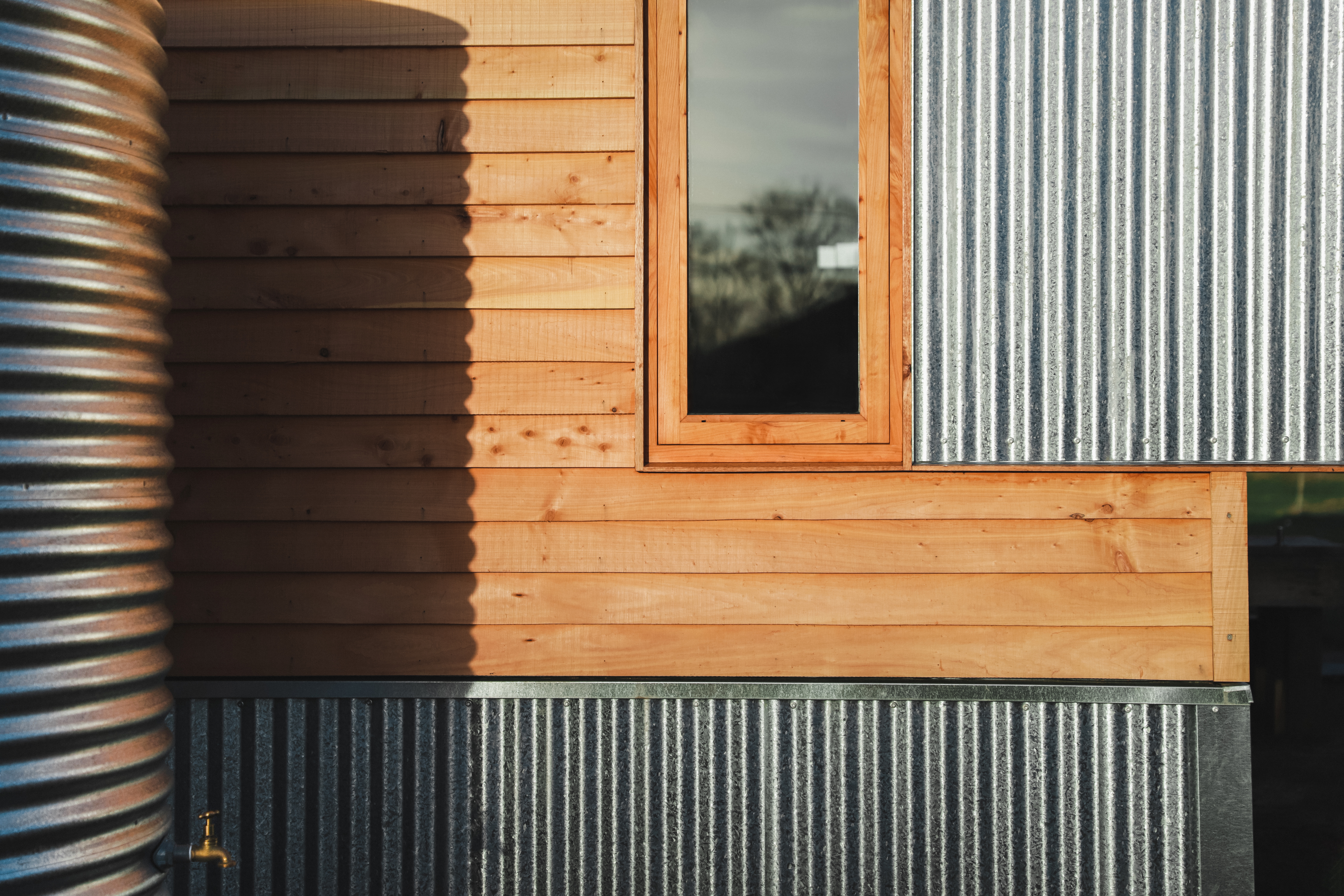
Contemporary use of corrugated galvanised iron in architecture.

Henry Robinson Palmer, architect and engineer to the London Dock Company, was granted a patent in 1829 for "indented or corrugated metallic sheets". It was originally made from wrought iron produced by puddling. It proved to be light, strong, corrosion-resistant, and easily transported, and particularly lent itself to prefabricated structures and improvisation by semi-skilled workers. It soon became a common construction material in rural areas in the United States, Argentina, Spain, New Zealand and Australia and later India, and in Australia and Argentina also became (and remains) a common roofing material even in urban areas. In Australia and New Zealand particularly it has become part of the cultural identity, and fashionable architectural use has become common. CGI is also widely used as building material in African slums and informal settlements.

For roofing purposes, the sheets are laid somewhat like tiles, with a lateral overlap of one and half corrugations, and a vertical overlap of about 150 millimetres (5.9 in), to provide for waterproofing. CGI is also a common construction material for industrial buildings throughout the world.

Wrought iron CGI was gradually replaced by mild steel from around the 1890s, and iron CGI is no longer obtainable, but the common name has not been changed. Galvanised sheets with simple corrugations are also being gradually displaced by 55% Al-Zn coated steel or coil-painted sheets with complex profiles. CGI remains common.

== Corrugation today ==
Today the corrugation process is carried out using the process of roll forming. This modern process is highly automated to achieve high productivity and low costs associated with labour. In the corrugation process sheet metal is pulled off huge rolls and through rolling dies that form the corrugation. After the sheet metal passes through the rollers it is automatically sheared off at a desired length. The traditional shape of corrugated material is the round wavy style, but different dies form a variety of shapes and sizes. Industrial buildings are often built with and covered by trapezoidal sheet metal.

Many materials today undergo the corrugation process. The most common materials for corrugated iron are ferrous alloys (e.g. stainless steels), aluminium and copper. Regular ferrous alloys are the most common due to price and availability. Common sizes of corrugated material can range from a very thin 30 gauge (0.012 inches, 0.3 mm) to a relatively thick 6 gauge (0.1943 inches, 5 mm). Thicker or thinner gauges may also be produced.

Other materials such as thermoplastic and fiberglass-reinforced plastic sheets are also produced with corrugations. Clear or translucent products can allow light to penetrate below.

== Pitch and depth ==
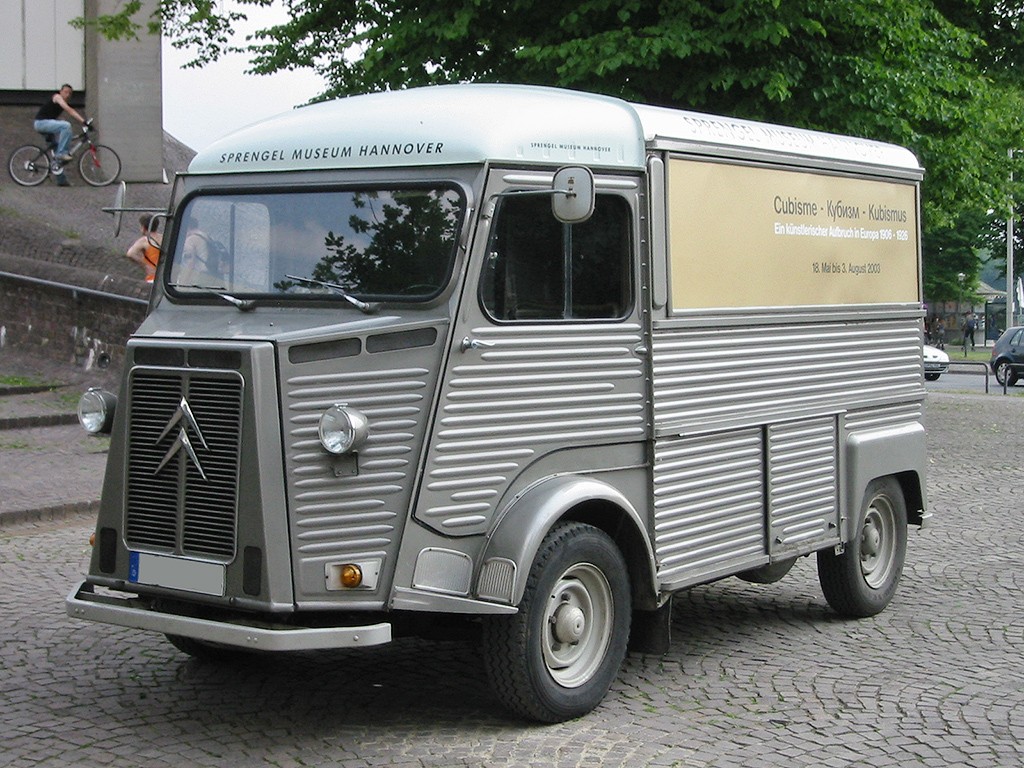
Citroën HY van with body made of iron sheet.

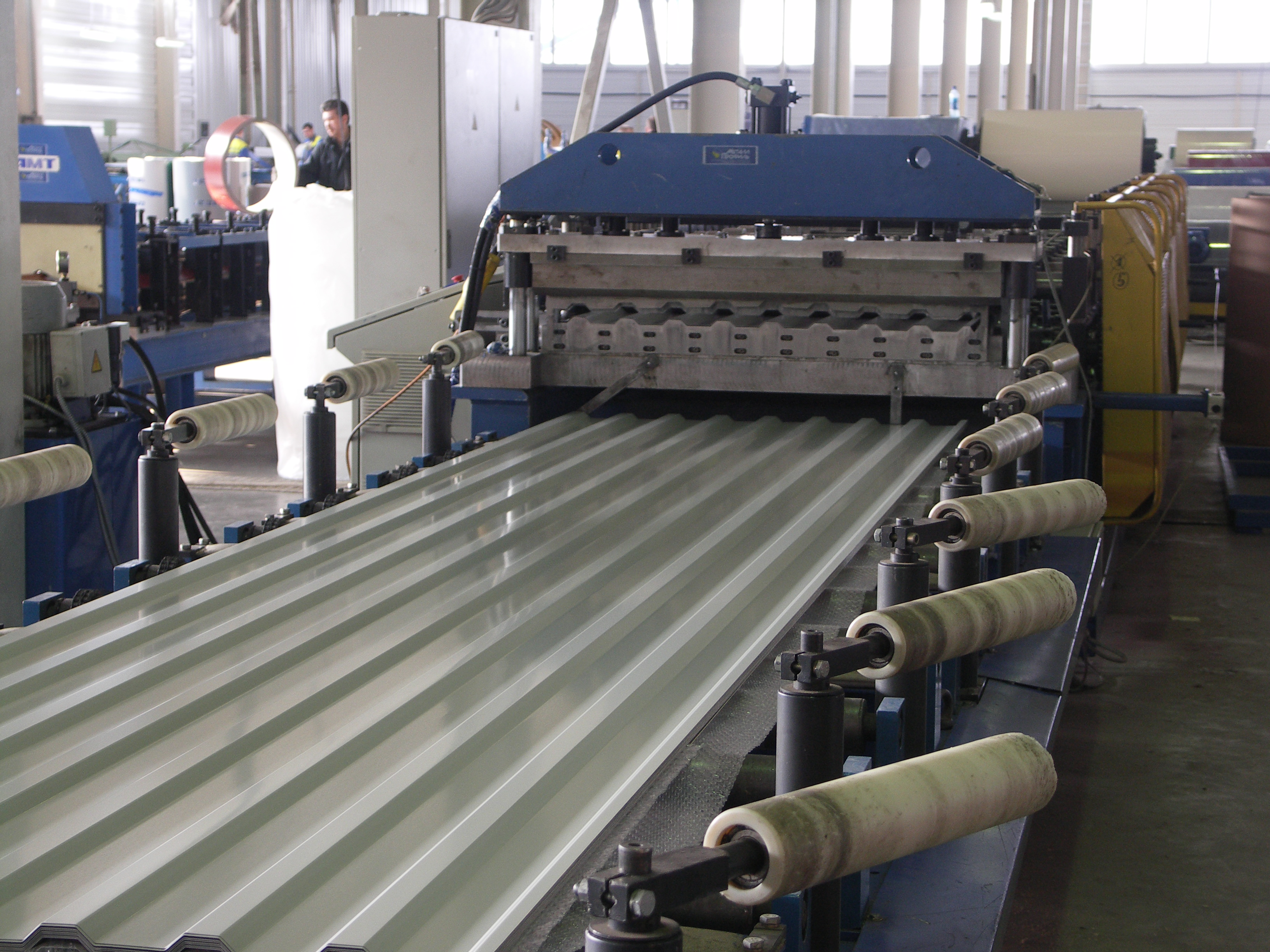
A stack of new iron sheets

The corrugations are described in terms of pitch (the distance between two crests) and depth (the height from the top of a crest to the bottom of a trough). It is important for the pitch and depth to be quite uniform, in order for the sheets to be easily stackable for transport, and to overlap neatly when joining two sheets. Pitches have ranged from 25 mm (1 inch) to 125 mm (5 inches).

It was once common for CGI used for vertical walls to have a shorter pitch and depth than roofing CGI. This shorter pitched material was sometimes called "rippled" instead of "corrugated". However nowadays, nearly all CGI produced has the same pitch of 3 inches (76 mm).

A design of corrugated galvanised steel sheets "Proster 21", used as formwork, has 21 millimetre deep V-shaped pits.

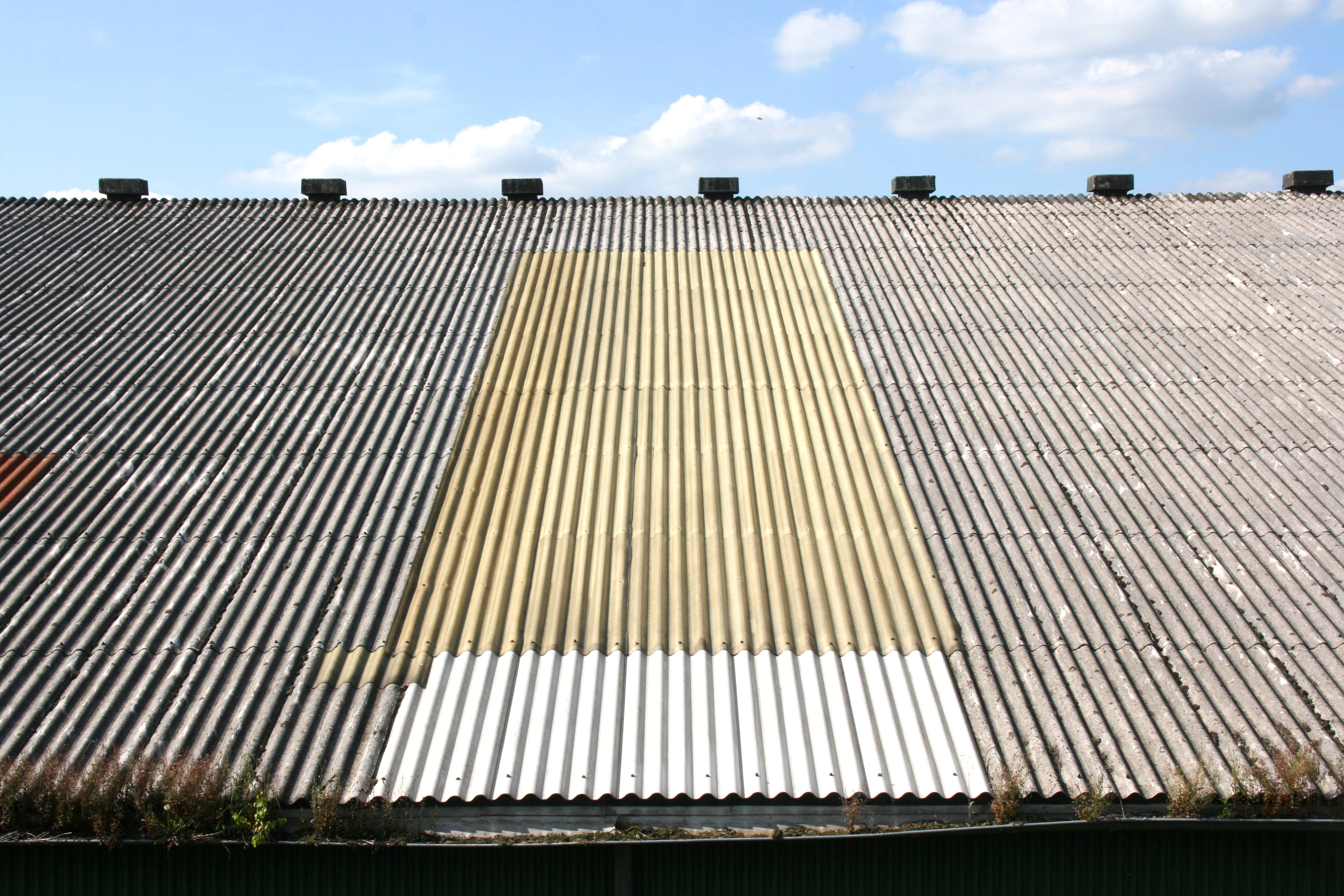
Corrugated galvanised iron roof.

== Corrosion ==
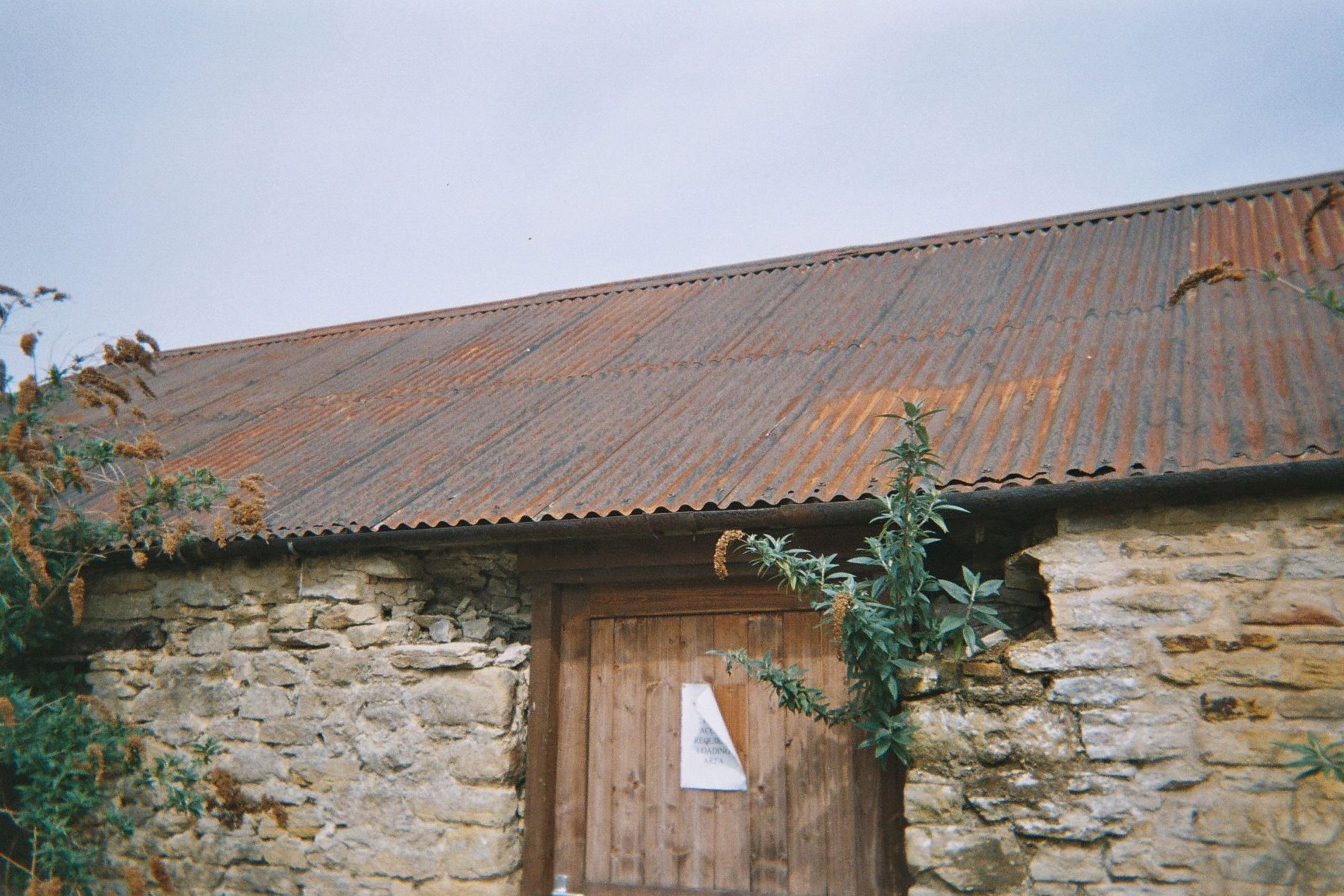
Rusted corrugated steel roof

Although galvanising inhibits the corrosion of steel, rusting is inevitable, especially in marine areas–where the salt water encourages rust–and areas where the local rainfall is acidic. Corroded corrugated steel roofs can nevertheless last for many years, particularly if the sheets are protected by a layer of paint.

== See also ==
- Chattel house
- Metal roof
- Nissen hut
- Quonset hut
- Theorema Egregium, for more information on why corrugation increases strength
- Tin tabernacle
