= Leyland National =

Integral rear-engined single-deck bus

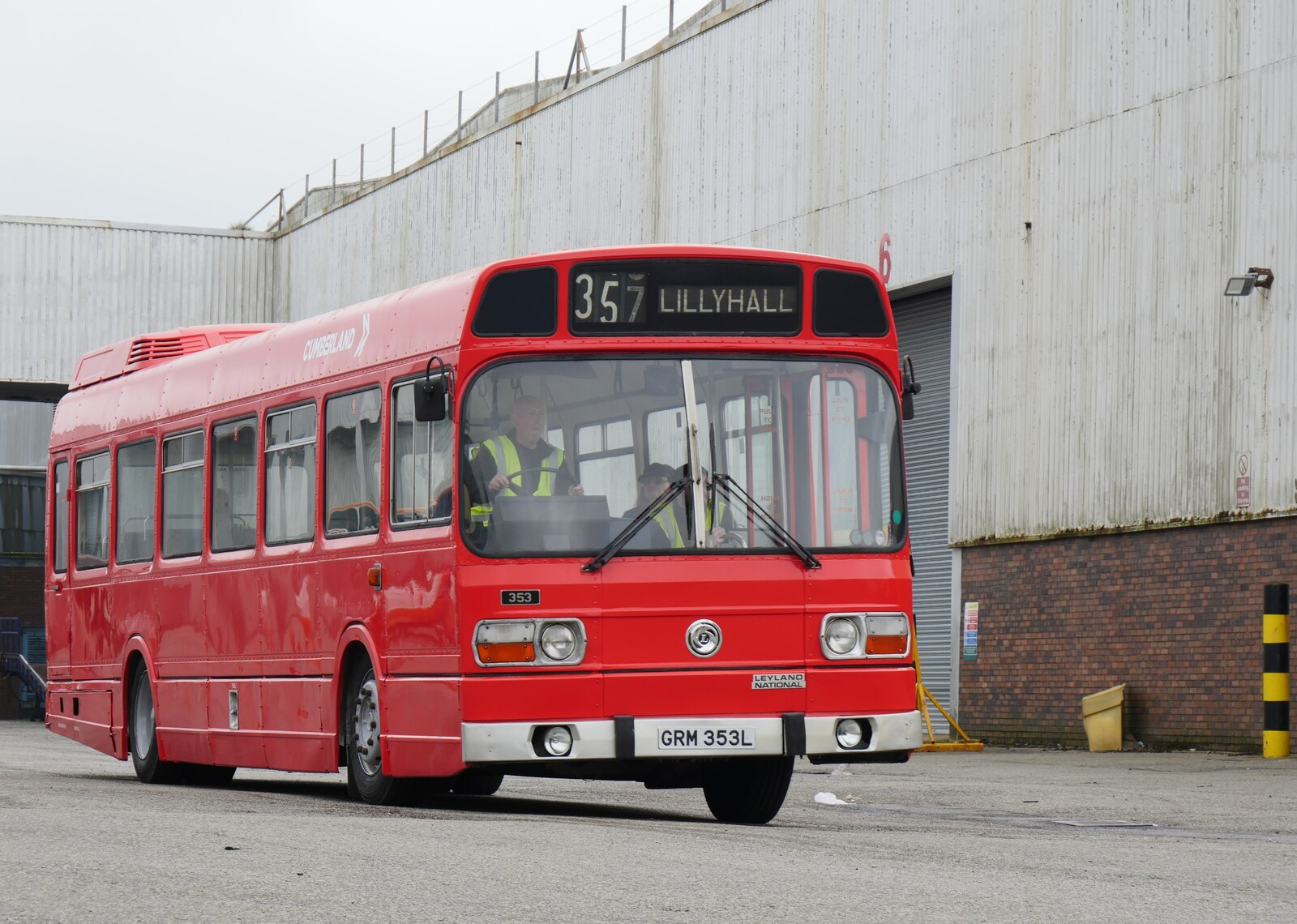
- Preserved NBC Cumberland Leyland National outside the former British Leyland Lillyhall factory in May 2022

Overview
- Manufacturer: Leyland
- Production: 1972–1985
- Assembly: Workington, Cumbria, England
- Designer: Giovanni Michelotti

Body and chassis
- Doors: 1, 2 or 3
- Floor type: Step entrance
- Chassis: Integral

Powertrain
- Engine: Leyland 510; Leyland 0.680 Leyland TL11; Gardner 6HLXB; Gardner 6HLXCT
- Transmission: Leyland; Voith 851

Dimensions
- Length: 10.3 m (34 ft); 10.6 m (35 ft); 10.9 m (36 ft); 11.3 m (37 ft); 11.6 m (38 ft)

Chronology
- Predecessor: AEC Swift; Bristol RE; Daimler Fleetline; Daimler Roadliner; Leyland Panther
- Successor: Leyland Lynx

The Leyland National is an integrally constructed British step-floor single-decker bus manufactured in large quantities between 1972 and 1985. It was developed as a joint project between two UK nationalised industries – the National Bus Company and British Leyland. Buses were constructed at a specially-built factory at the Lillyhall Industrial Estate in Workington. Styling was carried out by the Italian vehicle stylist Giovanni Michelotti, previously commissioned by both Triumph (Herald, TR4, GT6, 2000/2500, 1300, Dolomite and Stag) and Scammell lorries (Routeman GRP cab).

It was intended to replace all the rear-engined single-decker buses offered by British Leyland, including the AEC Swift, Bristol RE, single-deck Daimler Fleetline, Daimler Roadliner and Leyland Panther.

== Design ==
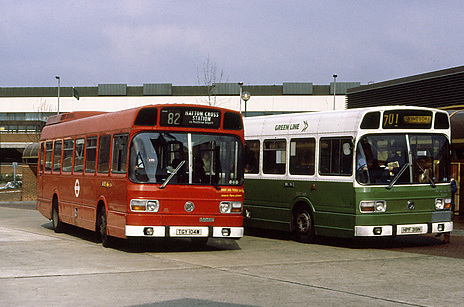
London Transport and London Country Green Line Leyland Nationals at Heathrow Airport bus station in 1980

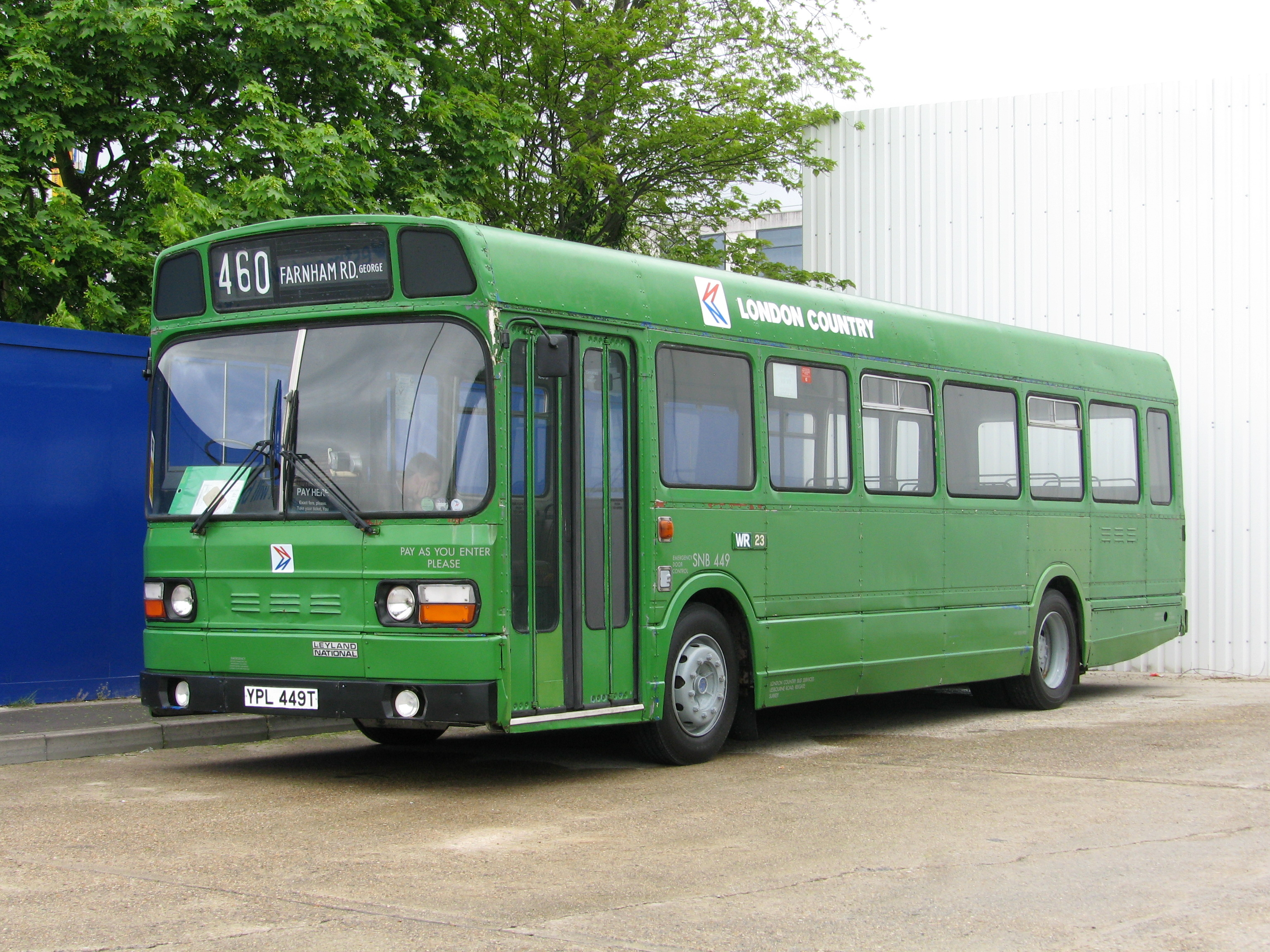
A preserved Mk1 Series B National, showing the podless roof, front air vents and black light surrounds that were characteristic of this model.

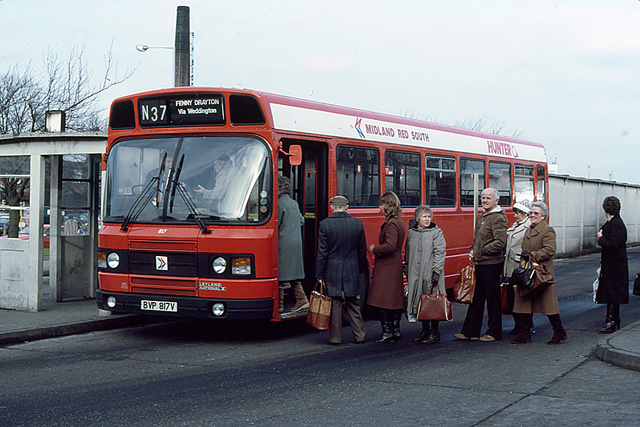
Midland Red South Leyland National 2 in Nuneaton in 1983

The Leyland National was built with integral, modular construction and a rear engine. All components were designed for ease of construction and replacement. Until 1978, it was always built with a roof mounted pod at the rear, housing the heating equipment, which consequently blew warm air out at roof level. At first the pod was almost the length of a bay, designed to keep dirt away from the heaters while also giving the bus a Trans-Atlantic feel. In 1976 a new shorter version of the roof pod was introduced, along with the battery being relocated to the front under the cab.

The Leyland National was available in three lengths, the majority being 10.3 metres (34 ft) and 11.3 metres (37 ft). It was easy to spot the longer models as their side windows were all the same length, whereas on the shorter models, the windows were shorter except for one in the middle (where the exit doors were on dual door variants), which was the same length as on the longer models. The third length was 10.9 metres (35 ft 9 in), specially produced for Australian operators due to stringent axle weight limits. This used the front section of the long version and the rear section of the short version. The prototype of this latter version was sold to a Scottish operator, Rennies of Dunfermline, and was fitted out to dual purpose coaching specification for use on express services.

The Leyland National was a simple design: all parts could be replaced. Some operators, like London Transport, purchased dual-door models, and then later configured some of them to single door. This was helped by the design of the body, the fact that parts were interchangeable and that the bus was constructed using Avdelok rivets, specially designed for the National, instead of the more usual pop rivets screws or welding. Leyland engineers found that during the development of the National, body repairs could be completed at least a tenth of the time quicker than on buses with conventional welded panels.

The earlier vehicles were only available in a limited number of standard colours, e.g. dark red, light red, dark green, to try to match but simplify existing operators' liveries. This just predated the decision by the National Bus Company to standardise on two colours: poppy red and leaf green. The timing was such that several vehicles were delivered in dark red paint to Ribble, who repainted them poppy red before entry into service. At London Transport's insistence, London bus red was added to the colour card, and their fleet eventually amounted to 506 examples, 69 of these being National 2s purchased for Red Arrow services, between 1973 and 1980.

In 1978, Leyland brought out a simplified model, the Series B, intended to replace the Bristol LH which had been in production since 1967 and was a type popular in NBC companies for rural routes. It was available at only 10.3 metres (34 ft) in length and had a revised interior that featured minimal lighting and removed the rear roof-mounted heating unit in previous models. Heating was under the seats and was basic but effective. These vehicles were lighter, and this characteristic and the lower cost helped make extra sales. London Country bought a large number of Series Bs, which other operators quickly purchased second-hand when London Country was broken up in 1986.

The National 2 was introduced in 1979. It differed from its predecessor mainly by having a wider choice of engines, along with a new nose moulding giving it a more bulbous look and a grille to cool the new front-mounted radiator, and a revised rear end with new lights and a different engine door.

=== Engines ===
The Mark I Leyland Nationals had an 8.3-litre straight-six turbocharged Leyland 510 headless diesel engine. The Leyland 510 engine had an unusual design, in that it featured non-detachable cylinder heads; any work on the valves required the crankshaft and pistons to be removed to enable access from the cylinder bore. This engine did not prove popular with all operators, being prone to poor fuel consumption and heavy smoke production if not maintained to high standards.

Some operators experimented with a different engine and found they could avoid the 510, which had the reputation of being a high maintenance unit and hard to work on.

Later on, a simplified model (10351B/1R) was offered, with an engine that was reduced in power to 150 bhp instead of the usual 180 bhp setting for the heavier duty version of the National.

As a result of the Leyland 510 engine no longer being offered, the National 2 was powered by initially the 0.680 engine then later the TL11.

In 1981, a Gardner 6HLXB engine was experimentally installed in an accident-damaged Eastern Counties Omnibus Company National. This paved the way for many engine conversions. Leyland were taken to court by Gardner for not offering their engine as an option in the fast selling National and as a result began to offer the Leyland National 2 with Gardner engines from 1982, initially the 6HLXB and later the 6HLXCT.

== Operators ==
=== United Kingdom ===
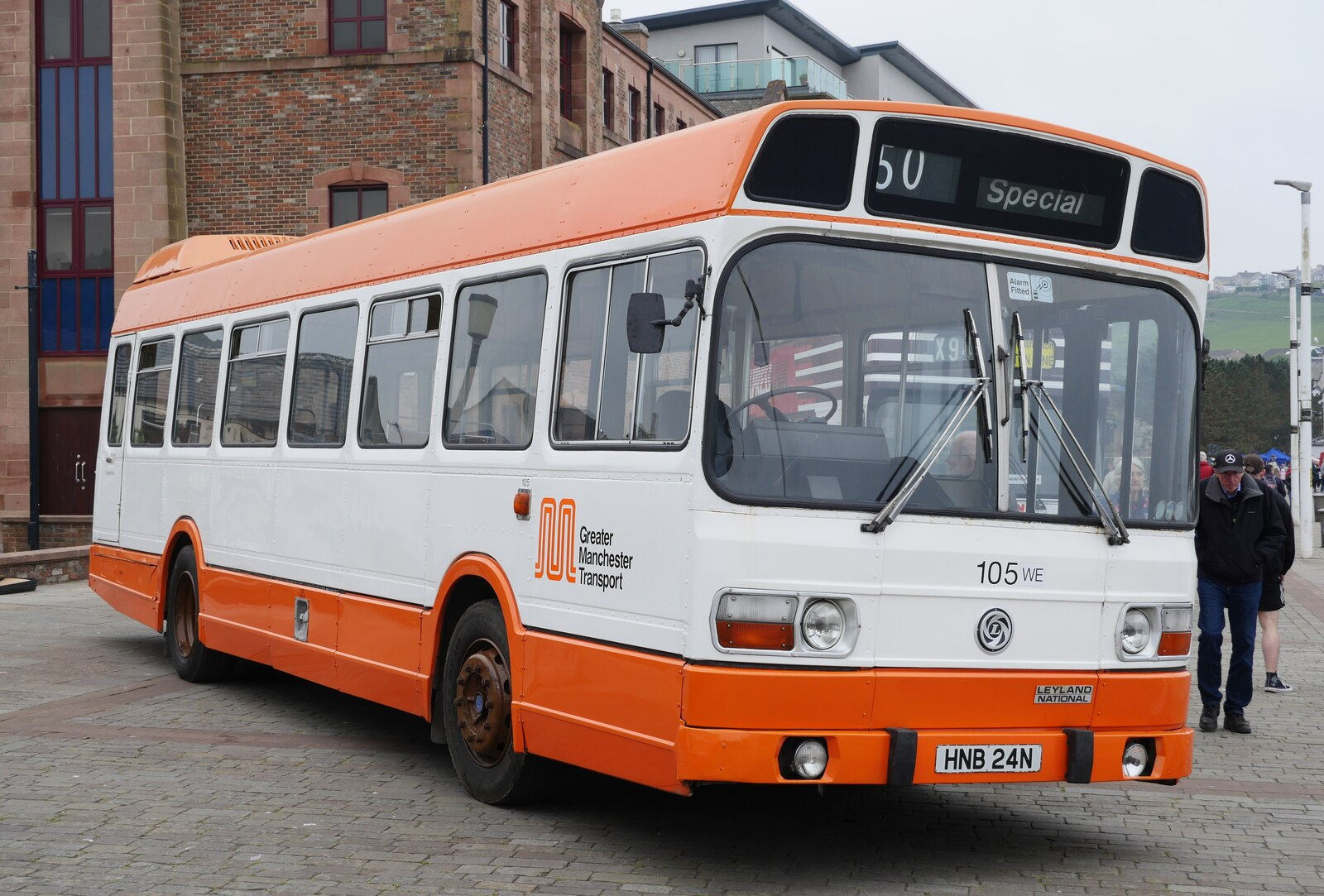
Preserved Greater Manchester Transport Leyland National in Whitehaven in April 2022

The first Leyland National was delivered in March 1972 to Cumberland Motor Services, registered ERM 35K, and the bus quickly became a common sight on British roads. Although developed for the National Bus Company (whose subsidiaries effectively had to purchase it), it was also bought by the Scottish Bus Group subsidiaries, London Transport, SELNEC and British Airways (which chose the 3 door version) and other operators.

==== Refurbishment ====
In years to come, with all of the pressures created by deregulation, operators began refurbishing their Nationals for extended service, often retrofitting DAF or Volvo engines. The riveted body parts were easily replaced. In some cases a vehicle could be repaired and returned to service on the same day. All new parts were painted with grey primer so operators could paint to their requirements.

A more extreme approach was offered by East Lancashire Coachbuilders with their Greenway, that saw virtually everything other than the frame and axles replaced.

=== Exports ===
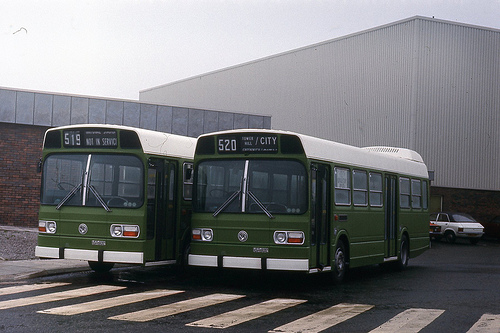
Jamaica Omnibus Service Leyland Nationals at the Workington factory in August 1975

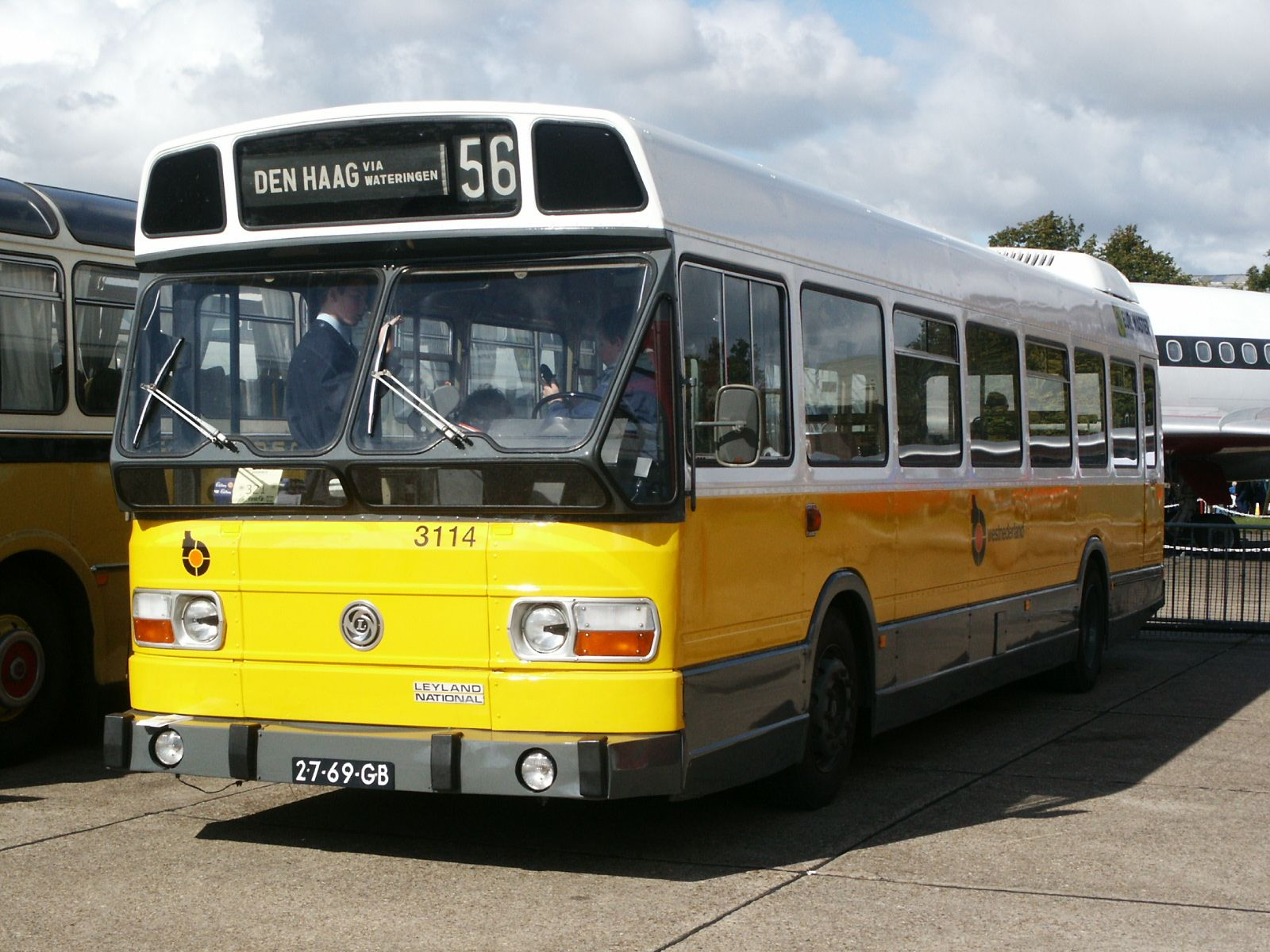
Preserved Westnederland Leyland National with an alternative windscreen model, designed to avoid glare, in The Hague in September 2002

The export version of the Leyland National was constructed in the standard way, although some were what might be called a hybrid, consisting of longer windows up to the rear axle and shorter ones after. This resulted in a 10.9 metres (36 ft) bus as opposed to standard 10.3–11.3 metres (34–37 ft) versions. Given the design, it was very easy to produce left hand drive vehicles and these were used as a way of generating orders.

The largest export order for the Leyland National was for 450 to Venezuela for operation by Inversionistas Del Transporte in Caracas between 1975 and 1976. Around 125 Leyland Nationals were also shipped to Kingston, Jamaica between 1972 and 1974 to be operated by the Jamaica Omnibus Service, a subsidiary of the British Electric Traction company. Fifty-five Nationals were exported to Trinidad and Tobago for use by the Public Transport Service Corporation, with 50 National 2s later delivered to the operator in 1980.

Nederlandse Spoorwegen in the Netherlands purchased 25 on behalf of their bus subsidiaries NZH, Westnederland, Centraal Nederland and Zuidooster. Problems with windscreen glare resulted in the windscreens being removed and a different version being fitted.

In France, Dijon purchased six, while St Étienne Municipality purchased 20.

Singapore Bus Services received a single 11.6 metres (38 ft) dual door Leyland National 2 in February 1981, registered SBS6820L and mostly used on bus route 143 until its withdrawal in 1983, after which it was exported to Australia.

In Australia, ACTION purchased 70 Nationals in 1974–75, 16 being fully assembled in England and 54 in Australia. Some were repowered with MAN engines. In 1975, Brisbane City Council purchased seven, while the Melbourne & Metropolitan Tramways Board purchased 30.

The Metropolitan Transport Trust purchased 63 in 1975–76 for use in Hobart. These were all 10.3 metres (34 ft) models, however one was rejected and its replacement was a 10.9 metres (36 ft) model. Surfside Buslines were the largest Australian private bus operator with a fleet of 38 purchased new and second-hand.

The chassis of the Leyland National was also sold as the Leyland B21 in limited numbers to overseas operators.

== Survivors ==
As a result of legislation preventing the use of step-entrance buses on normal public bus routes, no Nationals remain in service. The last major operator of Nationals in public service was Chase Bus Services of Chasetown, who sold its operations to Arriva Midlands and ceased operating as a separate entity on 28 April 2007. Notably all but two retained Leyland 510 engines to the end.

One Leyland National was converted by the Manx Department of Education and Children to act as a mobile IT classroom. The Manx Telecomputer Bus was in operation from 1998 to 2020.

Over 100 Leyland Nationals have been preserved. The Workington factory has closed, though part of the building now forms part of a Stobart Group depot; a rally commemorating 50 years of the Leyland National was held at the former factory in 2022.

== Adaptations ==
The National Bus Company commissioned a battery electric bus conversion of a Ribble Leyland National in the 1970s, which was achieved by removing the diesel engine and adding a 7 tonne battery trailer. The length of the vehicle meant that it needed special permission to operate on the highway, and this was only granted on the Runcorn Busway.

In 1980, some underfloor-engined articulated buses with bodywork derived from the Leyland National were assembled by Charles H Roe.

== Railbus derivatives ==
In the 1980s, Leyland National bus components were also used to build a family of railbuses and multiple units for British Rail:

- LEV (Leyland Experimental Vehicle) railbuses

Pacers

- Class 140
- Class 141
- Class 142

Super Sprinters

- Class 153
- Class 155

Despite the best intentions, the front end of the Leyland National was not considered substantial enough to allow for a standard bus front end to be used on train carriages. The body was very similar to a National; the components used were identical but the configuration was to a different format.

Leyland National-derived rolling stock
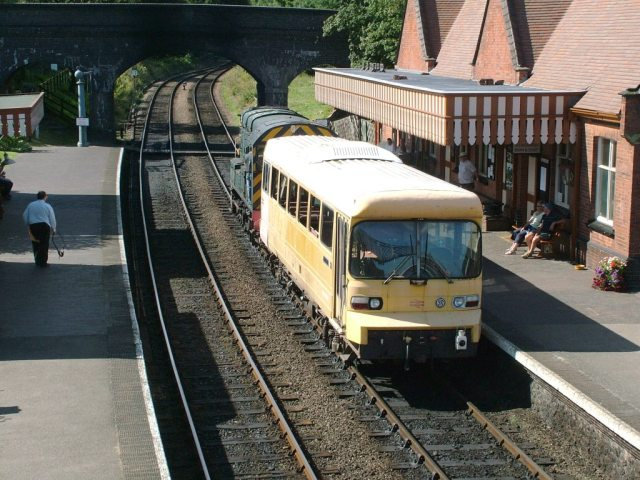
The prototype railbus LEV1, based on the Leyland National at Weybourne station in September 2005

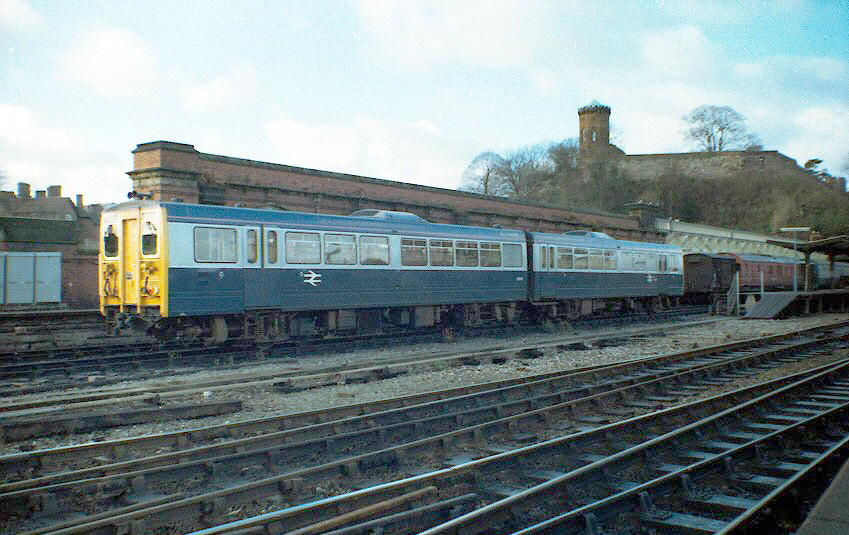
Class 140 at Shrewsbury on the Central Wales line in December 1981

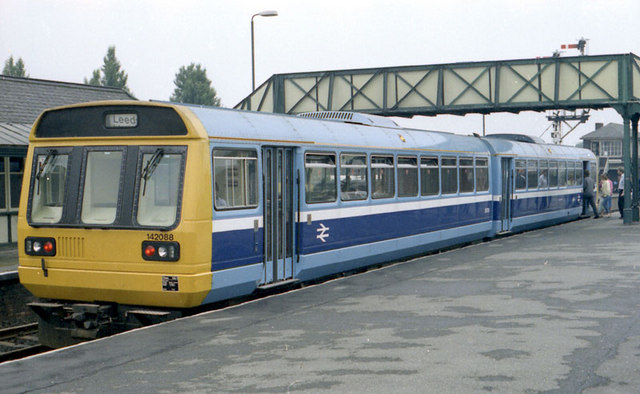
Class 142 in the original British Rail Provincial two-tone blue livery at Castleford in 1987

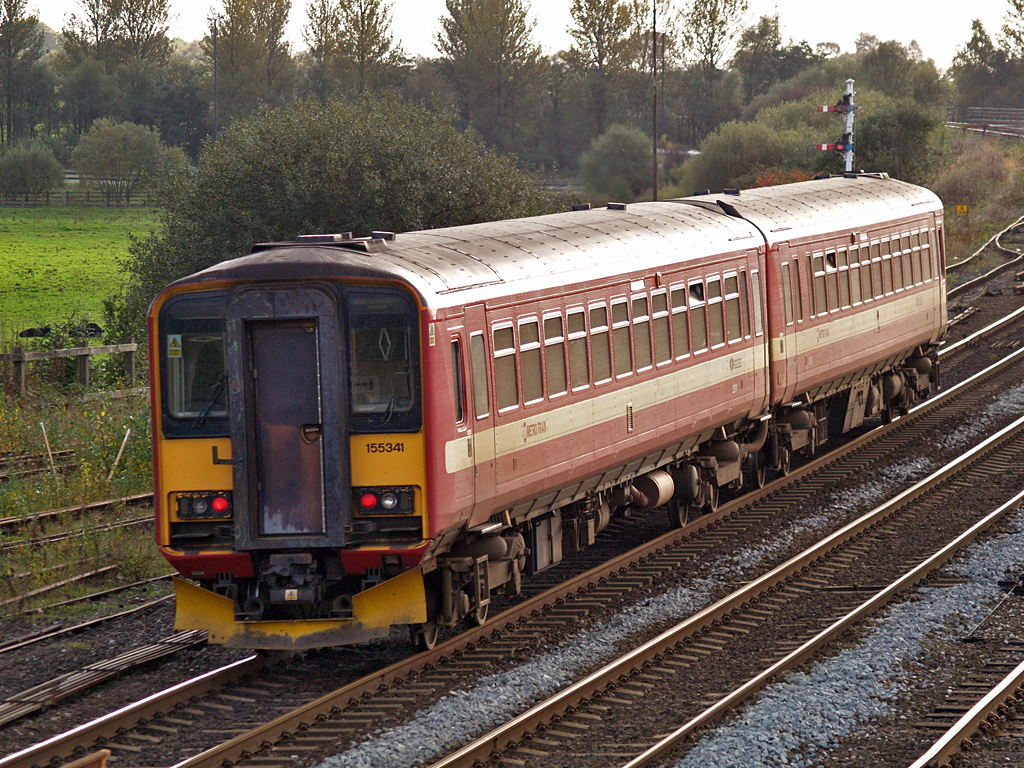
West Yorkshire PTE Class 155 in original carmine and cream livery
