= Leyland B21 =

Step-entrance single-deck bus chassis

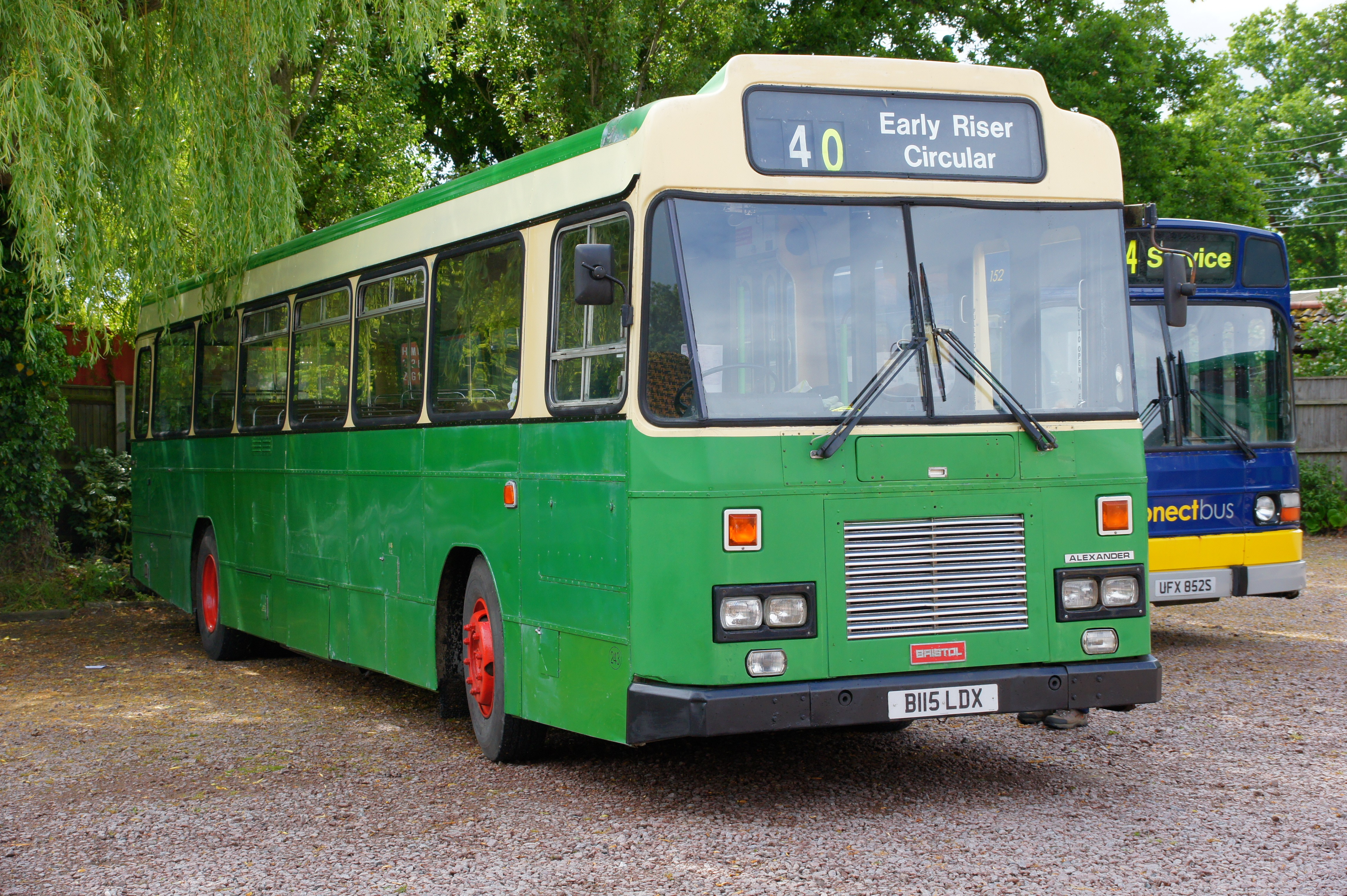
- Preserved Ipswich Buses Alexander bodied Leyland B21 in June 2013

Overview
- Manufacturer: Leyland
- Production: 1979–1985
- Assembly: Workington, England

Body and chassis
- Body style: Single-deck
- Floor type: Step entrance
- Related: Leyland National

Powertrain
- Engine: Leyland 510; GM 6V71
- Transmission: Allison HT740; Voith D851

Chronology
- Predecessor: Bristol RE

The Leyland B21 was a bus chassis manufactured by Leyland between 1979 and 1985. The chassis was developed from the integral Leyland National and was designed for overseas markets, with its biggest market being Australia.

The B21 was assembled at Leyland's Workington factory, with some work additionally performed at the company's Bristol works.

== Operators ==
In Australia, Transperth purchased 20 and Darwin Bus Service 18. Other purchasers included Benders Busways, Delwood Coaches, Melbourne-Brighton Bus Lines, Nowra Coaches and Surfside Buslines. All of the Australian chassis were powered by the GM 6V71.

In Belgium, SNCV of Brussels purchased 25. Israeli operator Egged sought to import 150, but difficulties over financing saw the deal fall through.

In the United Kingdom, Ipswich Buses purchased four and Ulsterbus six.
