= Bristol RE =

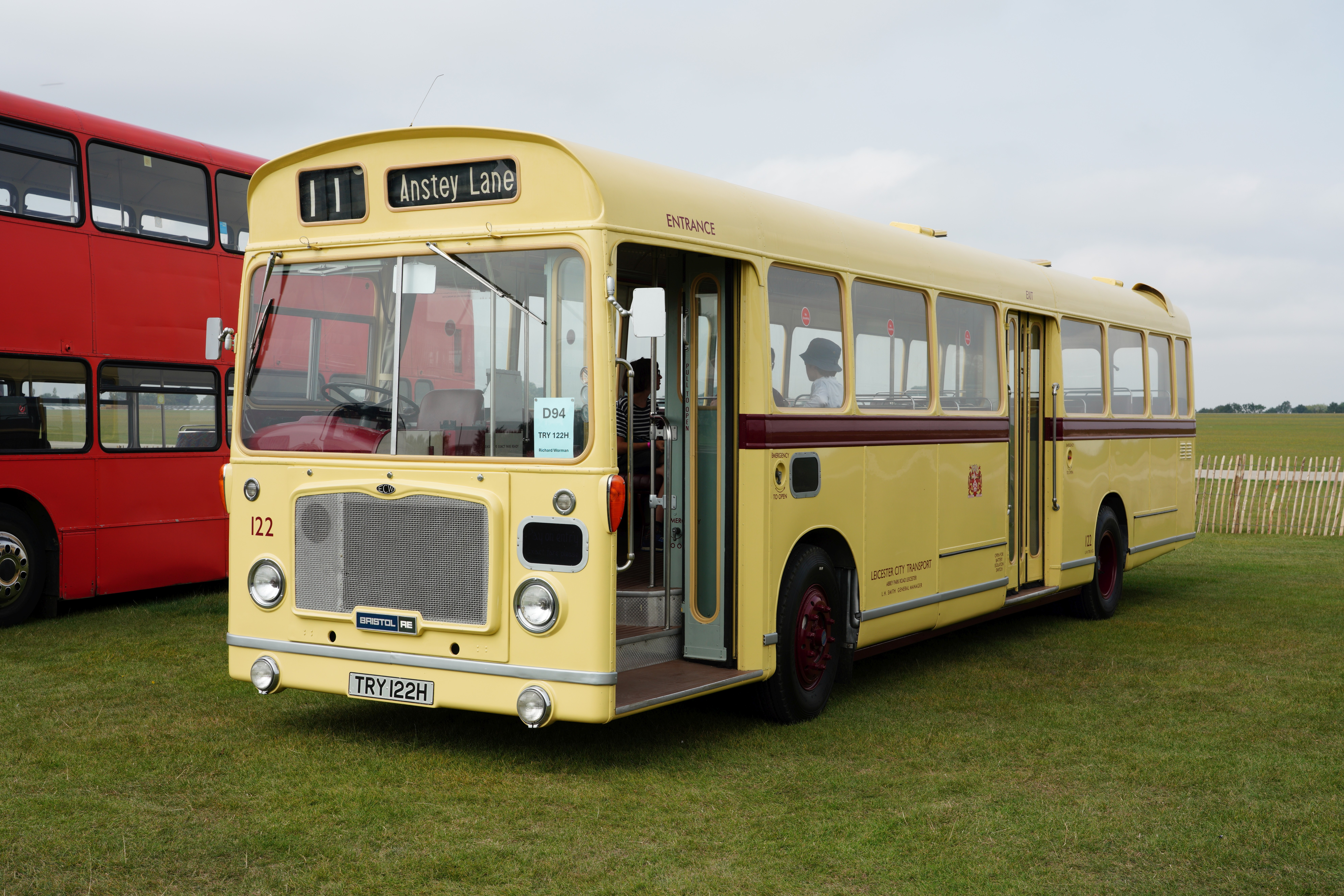
- Preserved Bristol RELL6L 122 (registration TRY 122H) at the BUSES Festival, Sywell Aerodrome

Overview
- Manufacturer: Bristol Commercial Vehicles
- Assembly: Brislington, Bristol

Body and chassis
- Doors: 1 or 2 doors
- Floor type: Step entrance
- Chassis: upswept sidemember ladder type (bus) straight ladder type (coach)

Powertrain
- Engine: Gardner 6HLW, 6HLX, 6HLXB; Leyland O600, O680, 510
- Capacity: up to 54 seats
- Power output: 120-184bhp
- Transmission: Bristol 5-speed Synchromesh, Bristol Self-Changing Gears 4 or 5 speed semi-automatic.

Dimensions
- Length: 10.0m to 12.0m
- Width: 2.5m
- Height: 3.0 to 3.3m
- Curb weight: up to 10 tonnes unladen, 14 tonne GVW

The Bristol RE was a rear-engined single-decker bus or single-decker coach chassis built by Bristol Commercial Vehicles from 1962 until 1983. It is often considered the most successful of the first generation of rear-engined single-decker buses.

Initially, the RE was only supplied to subsidiaries of the nationalised Transport Holding Company (THC), by which Bristol Commercial Vehicles was wholly owned. From 1965, when Leyland purchased a 25% shareholding in Bristol and the company's products became available to non state-owned bus operator customers, the RE also gained popularity with companies in other sectors, including the British Electric Traction (BET) Group and many municipal operators.

From 1972, sales to the National Bus Company (NBC), which had taken over the operations of both THC and BET) began to dry up, due to the introduction of the Leyland National. From 1976, the RE remained in production only for the Northern Irish state-owned bus companies Ulsterbus and Citybus, and for export to Christchurch Transport Board, New Zealand.

In Great Britain, the RE was most commonly fitted with bodywork by ECW, but several other manufacturers also built bodywork on the chassis. Some coaches were fitted with Duple Commander, Plaxton Panorama Elite or Alexander M Type bodywork. In Northern Ireland, the RE was bodied by Alexander (Belfast) with the X-Type bodywork.

Three of the ex-Citybus REs from Belfast were acquired by Pinewood Studios in October 2005, where they appeared in movies such as Children of Men and St Trinian's 2: The Legend of Fritton's Gold.

== Variants ==
- RELL - long (36'), low frame (bus)
- RESL - short, low frame (bus)
- RELH - long (36'), high frame (coach or dual-purpose)
- RESH - short, high frame (coach or dual-purpose; rare)
- REMH - maximum length (12m), high frame (coach)

These designations were suffixed by a code indicating the type of engine fitted:

- 6G - 6-cylinder Gardner diesel (6HLX)
- 6L - 6-cylinder Leyland diesel (O.600/O.680)

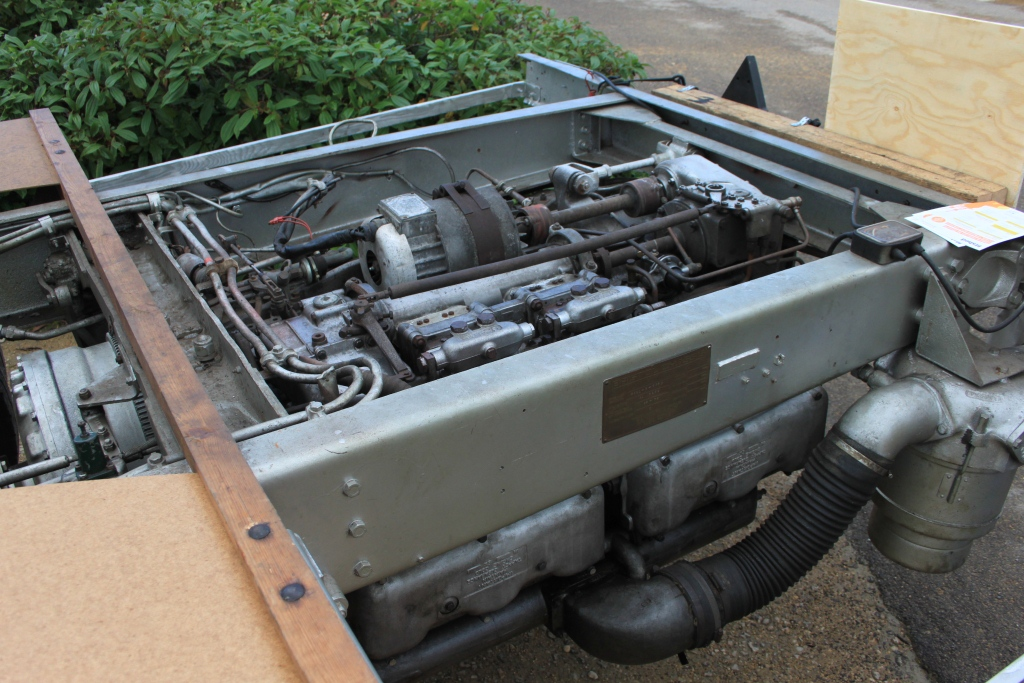
A Gardner 6-cylinder engine fitted to an RELL chassis

What was to be the first production chassis (212.001) was changed to a pre-production model (number REX.003), with a coach body built by ECW but devoid of any seats and fittings. It was used by Bristol Commercial Vehicles at its Brislington Experimental Shop for a few years. It was fitted and ran with a horizontal version of the contemporary Bristol BVW engine, and also fitted with a turbo-charger. Later the Gardner engine was refitted, the body completed and sold to West Yorkshire as their fleet number CRG1 OWT241E.

The most popular model was the RELL, with 2,839 constructed; there were 976 of the RELH model and 698 RESL. The two least successful models were the REMH, with 105 sold to just three customers, and the RESH with 11 built for four customers. A sixth model, designated REML, was advertised from 1968 but none was built. This would have had the 20-foot (6.1 m) wheelbase of the REMH but a low frame suitable for a bus body.

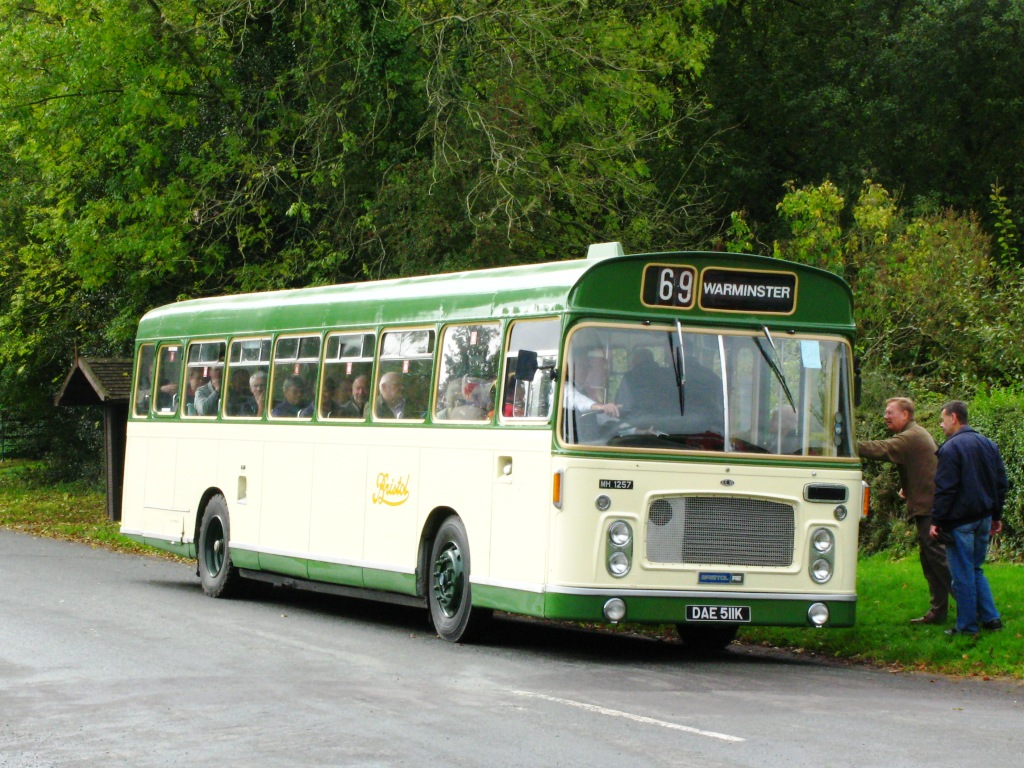
RELL with late ECW bus body

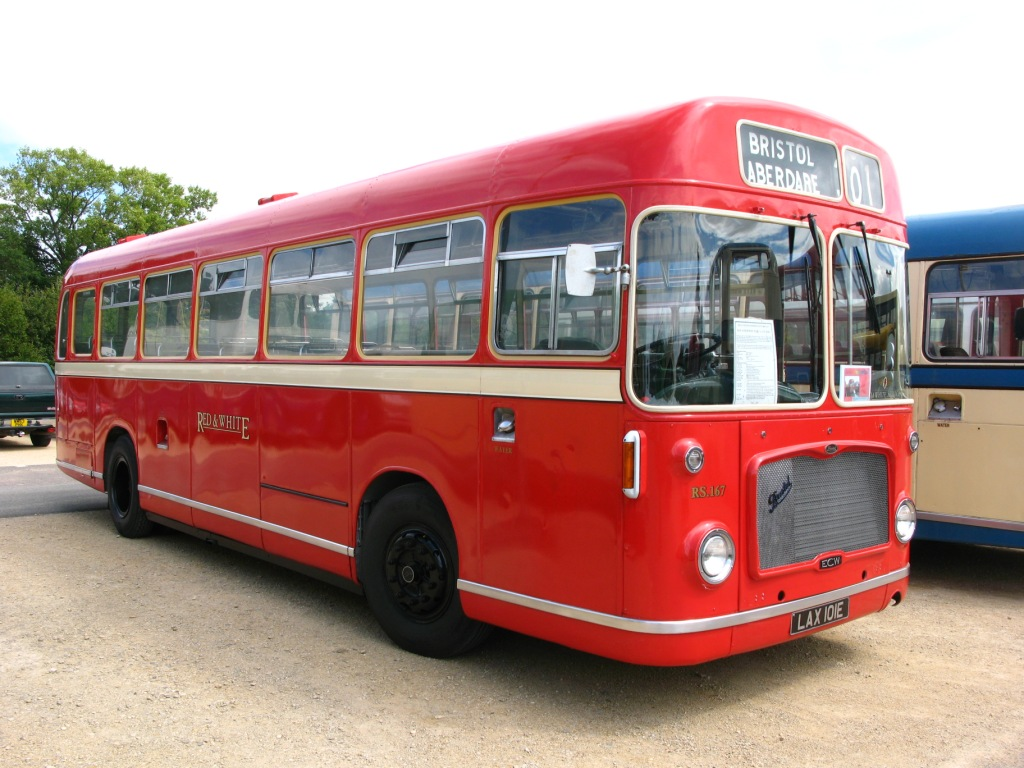
RESL with early ECW bus body

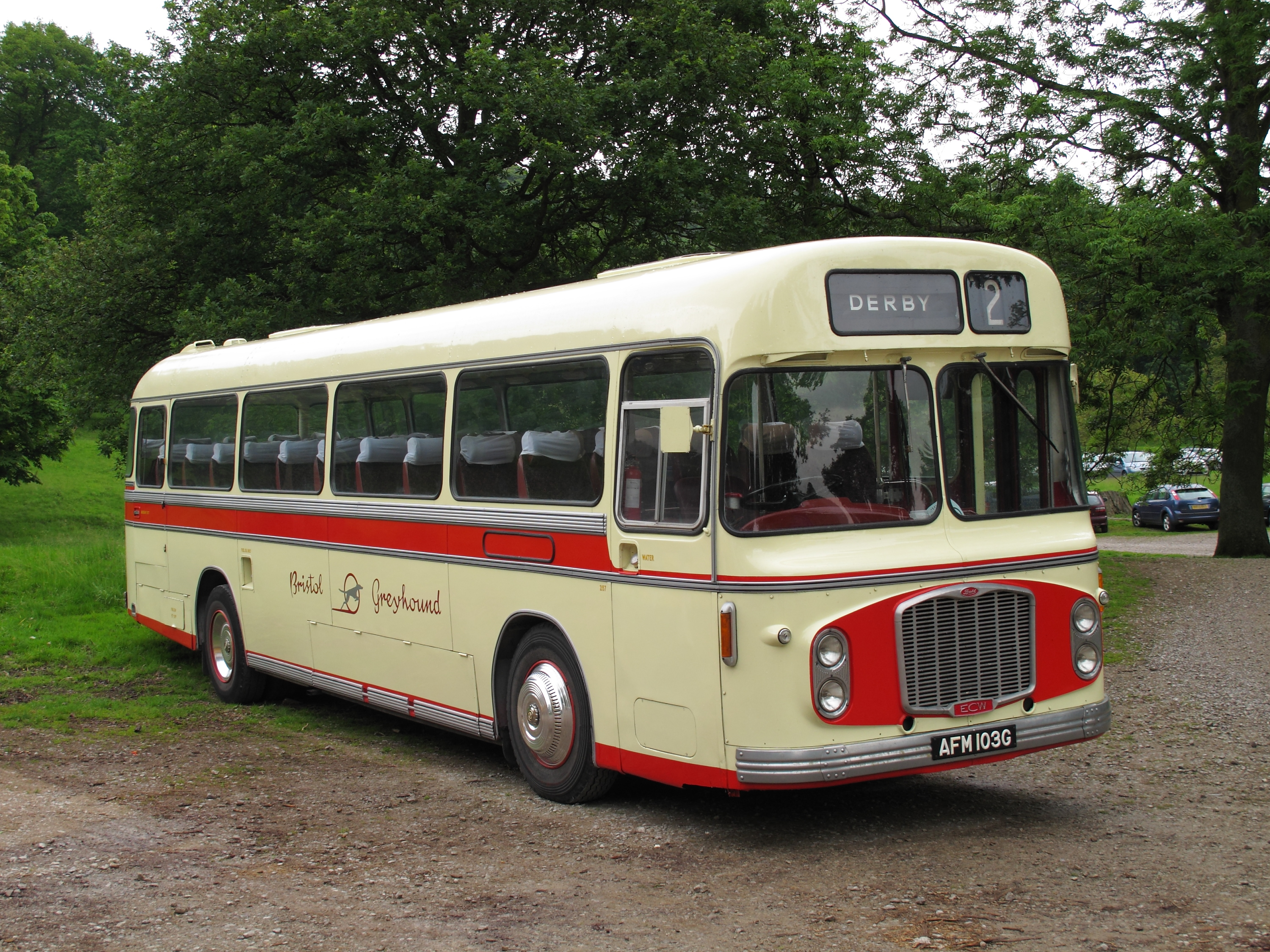
RELH with early coach body

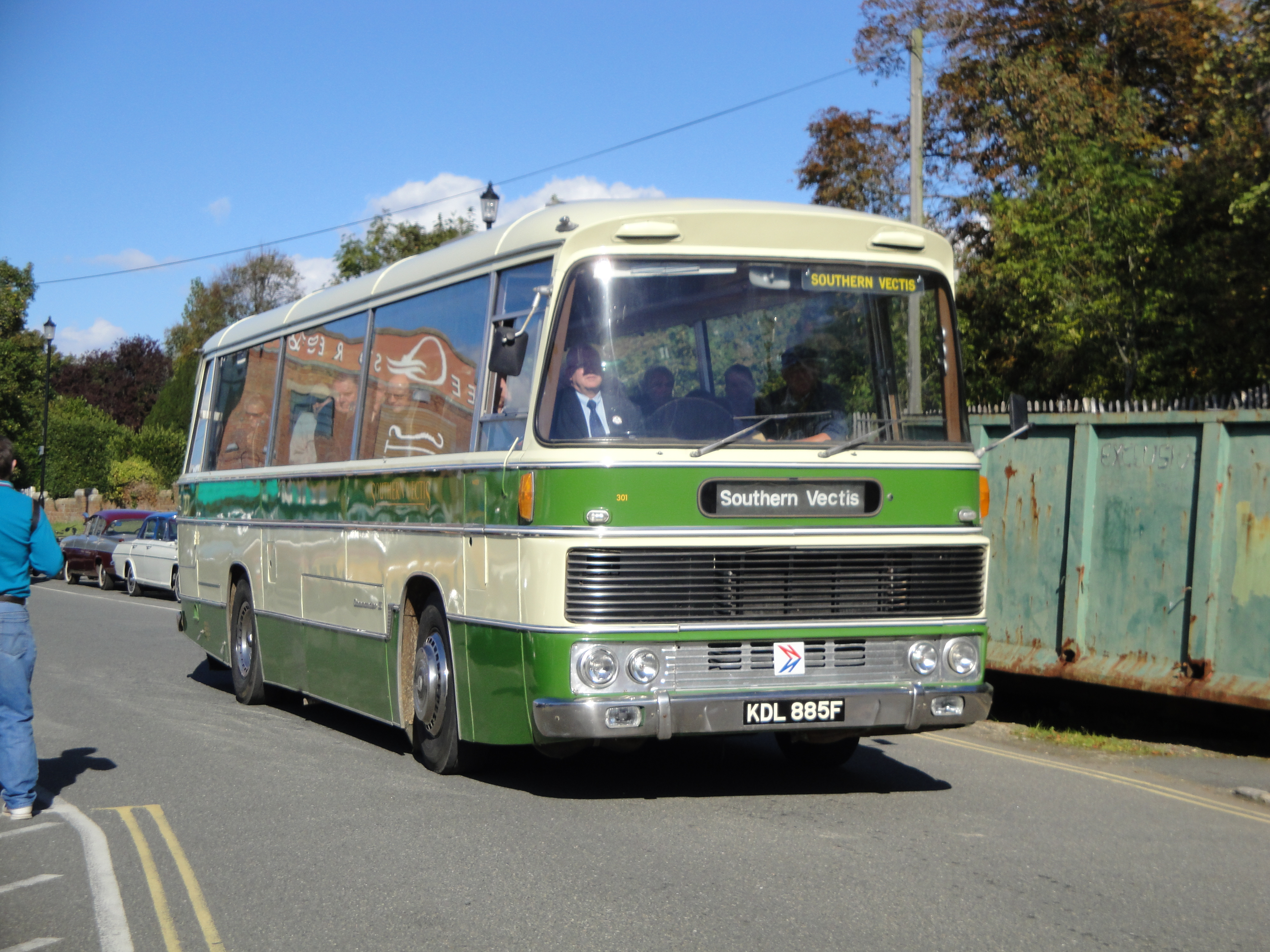
RESH with Duple Commander coach body

== Customers ==
Of the 4,629 Bristol REs built, 3,242 were sold to subsidiaries of the NBC and its predecessor groups, THC and BET; 148 were sold to members of the Scottish Bus Group; 405 to British municipalities and PTEs; and 834 to other operators. The biggest customers were: Bristol Omnibus Company (439); Crosville Motor Services (288); Ulsterbus/Citybus (620); United Automobile Services (470); West Yorkshire Road Car Company (259).
