= PPGI =

PPGI is pre-painted galvanised iron, also known as pre-coated steel, coil coated steel, color coated steel etc., typically with a hot dip zinc coated steel substrate.

The term is an extension of GI which is a traditional abbreviation for Galvanized Iron. Today the term GI typically refers to essentially pure zinc (>99%) continuously hot dip coated steel, as opposed to batch dip processes. PPGI refers to factory pre-painted zinc coated steel, where the steel is painted before forming, as opposed to post painting which occurs after forming.

The hot dip metallic coating process is also used to manufacture steel sheet and coil with coatings of aluminium, or alloy coatings of zinc/aluminium, zinc/iron and zinc/aluminium/magnesium which may also be factory pre-painted. While GI may sometimes be used as a collective term for various hot dip metallic coated steels, it more precisely refers only to zinc coated steel. Similarly, PPGI may sometimes be used as a general term for a range of metallic coated steels that have been pre-painted, but more often refers more precisely to pre-painted zinc coated steel.

Zinc coated steel substrate for PPGI is typically produced on a continuous galvanizing line (CGL). The CGL may include a painting section after the hot dip galvanising section, or more commonly the metallic coated substrate in coil form is processed on a separate continuous paint line (CPL). Metallic coated steel is cleaned, pre-treated, applied with various layers of organic coatings which can be paints, vinyl dispersions, or laminates. The continuous process used to apply these coatings is often referred to as Coil Coating.

The steel thus produced in this process is a prepainted, prefinished and ready for further processing into finished products or components. to use material.

The coil coating process may be used for other substrates such as aluminium, or aluminium, stainless steel or alloy coated steel other than "pure" zinc coated steel. However, only "pure" zinc coated steel is typically referred to as PPGI. For example, PPGL may be used for pre-painted 55%Al/Zn alloy-coated steel (pre-painted GALVALUME(r) steel*)

Over 30 million tons of such coated steel is produced today in over 300 coating lines just in Boxing which is a little county in North of China.

China, South Korea and Taiwan are the top 3 producers of PPGI steel according to PPGI marketplace platform.
