= Advanced Passenger Train =

Experimental tilting high speed train developed by British Rail

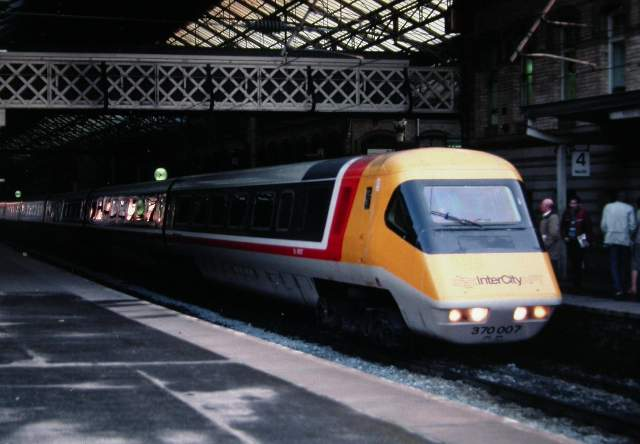
- APT-P at Preston station.
- In service: 1972–1976 (APT-E); 1980–1986 (APT-P)
- Manufacturers: BREL and British Rail Research Division
- Family name: APT
- Constructed: 1970 (APT-E); 1977–1980 (APT-P)
- Number built: 3 trainsets (APT-P); 1 trainset (APT-E)
- Formation: 14 cars per trainset (APT-P); 4 cars per trainset (APT-E)
- Operator: InterCity
- Line served: West Coast Main Line

Specifications
- Maximum speed: Service: 125 mph (200 km/h); Design: 155 mph (250 km/h)
- Track gauge: 1,435 mm (4 ft 8 1/2 in) standard gauge

The Advanced Passenger Train (APT) was a tilting high speed train developed by British Rail during the 1970s and early 1980s, for use on the West Coast Main Line (WCML). The WCML contains many curves, and the APT pioneered the concept of active tilting to address these, a feature that has since been copied on designs around the world. The experimental APT-E achieved a new British railway speed record on 10 August 1975 when it reached 152.3 miles per hour (245.1 km/h), only to be surpassed by the service prototype APT-P at 162.2 miles per hour (261.0 km/h) in December 1979.

Development of the service prototypes progressed slowly, and by the late 1970s the design had been under construction for a decade and the trains were still not ready for service. Facing the possibility of cancellation, BR management decided to put the prototypes into service, with the first runs along the London–Glasgow route taking place in December 1981. They proved to have a number of problems and this led to a press backlash when any problem, no matter how small, was excuse to heap scorn on the programme. It was referred to in the press as the "queasy rider" and "Accident Prone Train". The APTs were withdrawn from service to address these issues.

The problems were solved and the trains quietly reintroduced in 1984 with much greater success. By this time the competing High Speed Train, powered by a conventional diesel engine and lacking the APT's tilt and performance, had gone through development and testing at a rapid rate and was now forming the backbone of BR's passenger service. All support for the APT project collapsed as anyone in authority distanced themselves from what was still derided as a failure. Plans for a production version, APT-S, were abandoned, and the three APT-Ps ran for just over a year before being withdrawn again over the winter of 1985/6. Two of the three sets were broken up, and parts of the third sent to the National Railway Museum where it joined the APT-E.

Despite the challenges faced by the APT, its design was highly influential and directly inspired other high-speed trains, such as the Pendolino. The extensive work on electrification carried out alongside the APT was used effectively in later non-tilting designs, including the British Rail Class 91. The APT’s tilting system was reintroduced on the West Coast Main Line with the British Rail Class 390, which was based on the Fiat Ferroviaria tilting train design and built by Alstom. However, certain features introduced by the APT, such as the hydrokinetic braking system, have not been widely adopted.

== Background ==
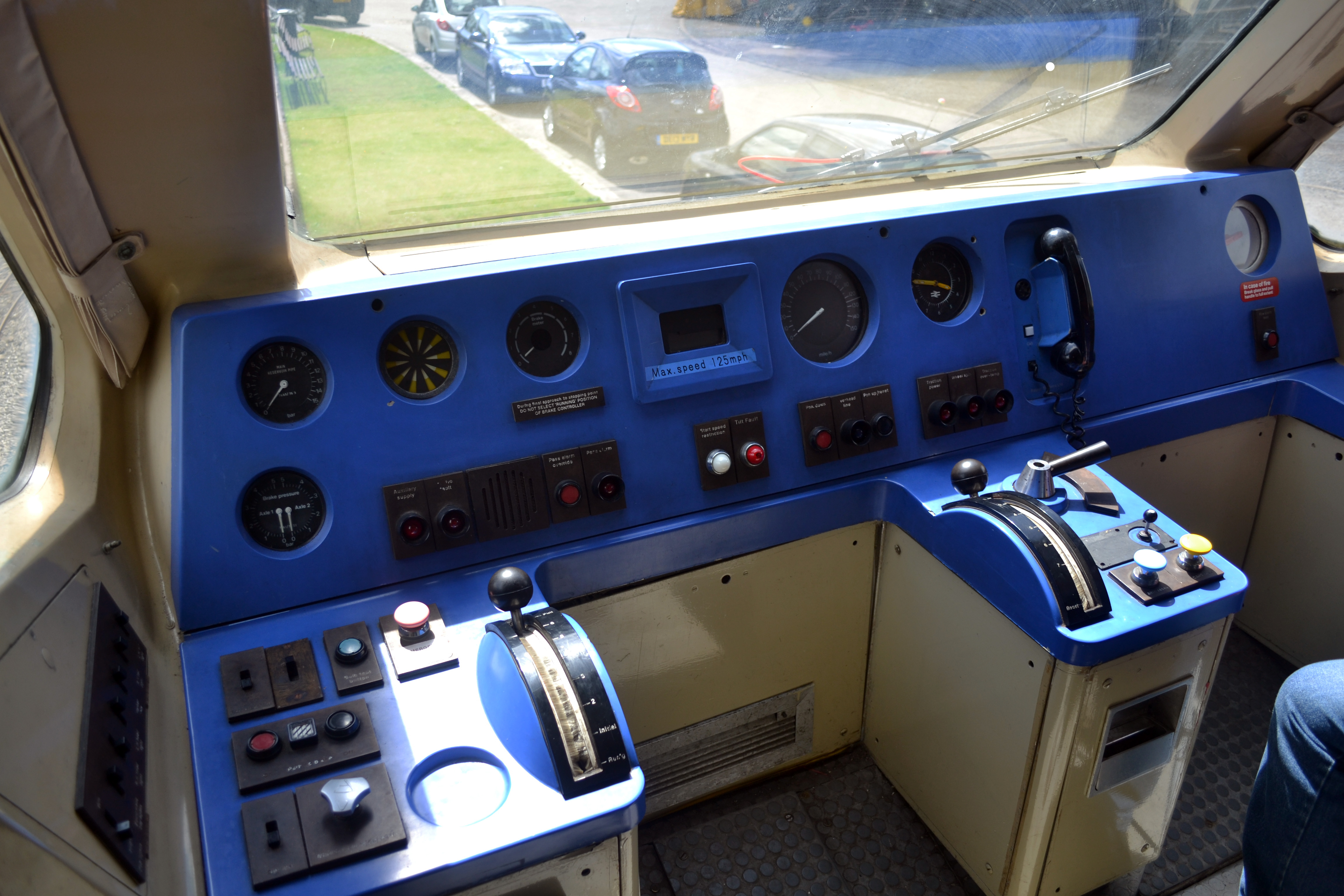
Driving controls of the Advanced Passenger Train (APT-P) at Crewe Heritage Centre.

=== British Rail Research Division ===
The period after nationalisation was marked with rapidly falling ridership levels.

Following nationalisation of the UK's railways in 1948, British Railways, as it was then known, faced significant reductions in passenger numbers as the motor car rapidly became more popular through the 1950s and 60s. By 1970, passenger numbers were roughly half what they had been immediately prior to World War II. In an attempt to maintain a level of profitability, the government commissioned a report that resulted in the abandonment of many lines as part of the 1963 "Beeching Axe". In spite of this significant restructuring, the organisation was still built on lines that were pre-war, with routings dating into the 1800s. Maintaining the network created problems with derailments increasingly common.

In 1962, Dr. Sydney Jones was hired away from the weapons department at R.A.E. Farnborough with the eventual aim of having him take over as BR's research lead from Colin Ingles, who retired in 1964. Looking into the derailments, they discovered that much of the problem was attributable to hunting oscillation. This was well known in the railway world, but usually happened only at high speeds. On the BR network, especially on freight cars with worn wheels, it was being seen at speeds as low as 20 miles per hour (32 km/h). Jones was convinced that hunting oscillation was an effect similar to the problem of aeroelastic flutter encountered in aerodynamics, and decided to hire someone from the aeronautics field to investigate it.

In October 1962, Alan Wickens was given the position. Wickens was a dynamics expert who had previously worked at Armstrong Whitworth on the Sea Slug missile and then for a period at Canadair in Montreal before returning to the UK and joining the Blue Steel missile project. (Note: The National Railway Museum site has the section header entitled "Blue Streak", a contemporary weapon system, but the text clearly states he worked on Blue Steel.) When the follow-on Blue Steel II was cancelled in favour of the US designed Skybolt, Wickens left A. V. Roe because he "saw the writing on the wall". He answered an ad for BR, and during the interview, he replied that he had no knowledge of, and little interest in, railway bogie design. It was later revealed this was the reason he was hired.

Over the next several years, Wickens' team carried out what is considered to be the most detailed study of the dynamics of steel wheels on rails ever conducted. Starting with incomplete work by F.W. Carter from 1930, the team studied conventional two-axle bogies and quickly discovered that, as Jones had suspected, the problem was dynamic instability. Out of this came the concept of a critical speed at which point hunting would become a problem. This examination was then extended to the unique two-axle bogieless car designs used on the BR freight network, where the problem was further modified by the dynamics of the entire vehicle.

Wickens concluded that a properly damped suspension system could eliminate the problem. The key realization was that the suspension had to be both vertical, as it had been in the past when based on leaf springs, but also horizontally to avoid small displacements triggering oscillation. Computers were used to simulate the motion and develop rules for how much damping would be needed to avoid the problem for any given speed. By 1964 this culminated in the first High Speed Freight Vehicle, HSFV-1, a bogieless freight car capable of travelling safely at speeds up to 140 mph (225 km/h). The same research suggested there was no practical upper limit to the achievable speeds in terms of dynamics, and that any limitations on maximum performance would be due to other factors like traction or wear on the lines. Eventually a series of six HSFV designs would be tested until 1976, and the last, HSFV-6, entered service that year.

=== Cant and tilting trains ===
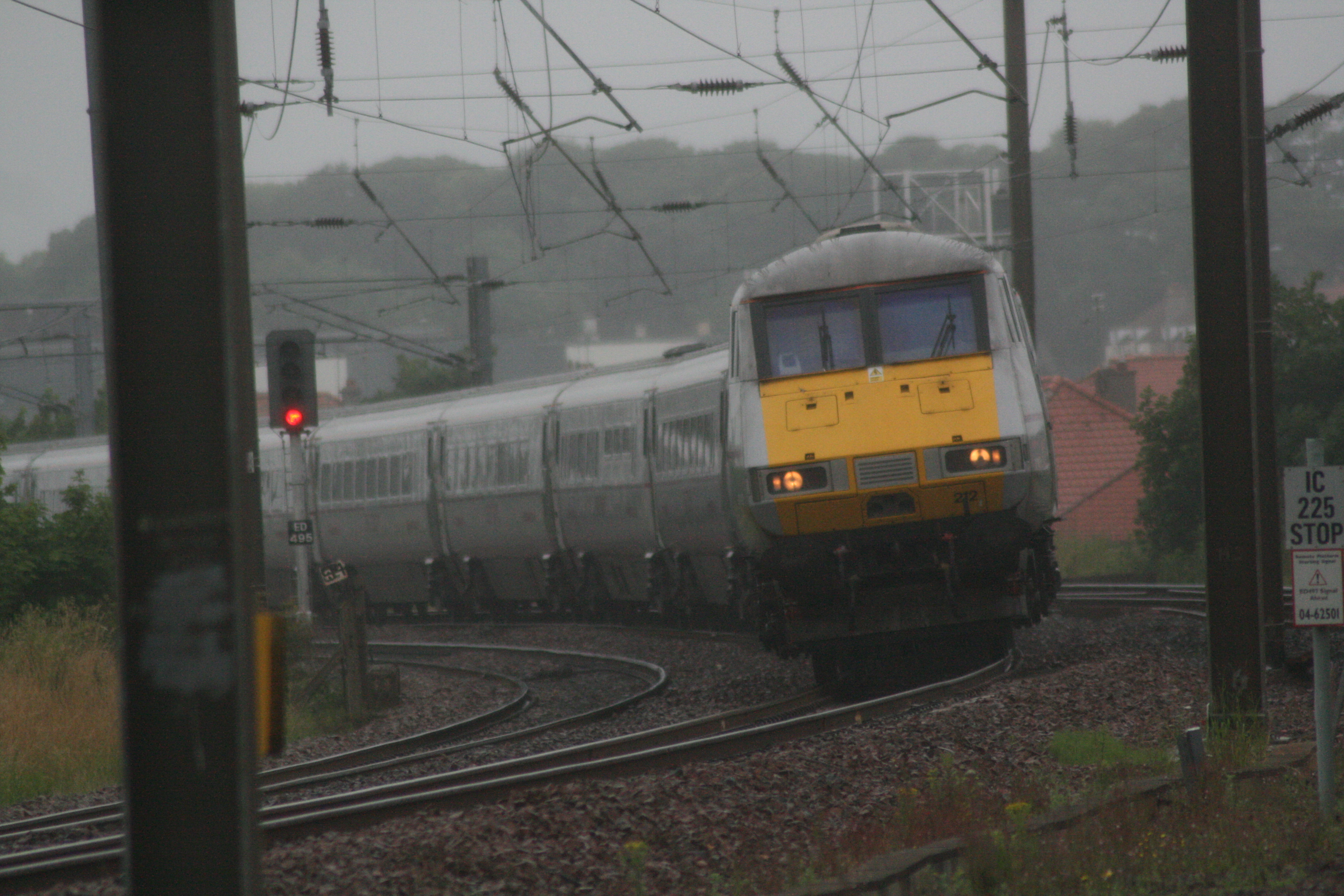
Superelevation was applied to portions of the BR network, although the angle was limited. Here, an InterCity 225, based on APT technology, rounds a canted turn on the East Coast Main Line.

During this period, BR's Passenger Business division produced a report suggesting rail could compete with road and air, but only if the trains ran faster. Studying the increase in ridership due to the introduction of the British Rail Class 55 "Deltic" engines on the East Coast Main Line, and the effects of electrification on the WCML which improved journey times 20 to 30%, they concluded that every 1 mile per hour (1.6 km/h) increase in speed would result in a 1% increase in passengers. This basic rule was apparently proven in Japan, when the Tokyo-Osaka Shinkansen line was operating from 1964 to huge success.

The Shinkansen provided a smooth ride at speeds as high as 125 mph (201 km/h) by laying new lines dedicated to high speed travel. BR's most used route, the WCML, had in the order of 6 million passengers a year between London and Manchester, a far cry from the Tokyo-Osaka's 120 million. Funding for a new line for high speed use was highly unlikely given these passenger levels. This presented a problem for any sort of high-speed operation on the route because the existing line contained many turns and curves, and rounding these at high speed would cause lateral forces that would make walking difficult, and throw items off tables onto the floor.

The traditional solution to this problem is to tilt the rails into the turns, an effect known as superelevation or cant. This has the effect of making the lateral forces more in line with the floor, reducing sideways forces. Because larger amounts of cant are more difficult to construct and maintain, and also because of the need to accommodate slower-moving traffic or the possibility of a train coming to a stand within the curve (both of which cases would consequently experience a force to the inside of the curve, a condition known as cant excess), long experience had shown that the maximum amount of cant that could be applied to lines with mixed traffic was 6.5 degrees.

Given the curve radii typically encountered on the WCML, this meant that even with the maximum permissible amount of cant applied, speeds couldn't be increased much above the 100 mph (161 km/h) range without once again experiencing excessive lateral forces. As the initial factor limiting speeds is not safety against derailing or overturning, but rather only passenger comfort, the solution to increasing speeds further is therefore having the train car bodies tilt as well – while this doesn't influence the forces acting at the wheel-rail level, it keeps the lateral forces experienced inside the passenger compartment at a comfortable level even at further increased speeds.

Talgo introduced the first practical design for a tilting carriage in the late 1950s. This consisted of a single bogie placed between the train cars with the car bodies suspended from an A-frame centered on the bogie with a pivot near the top. When the train rounded a bend, the centrifugal forces caused the car body to swing out like a pendulum, reaching the proper tilt angle naturally. However, this system had a distinct delay between entering the curve and the body swinging out, and then swung past this angle and then oscillated briefly until settling at the right angle. When traversing a series of curves, like in a switchyard, it tended to swing about alarmingly. Although a number of semi-experimental designs of the 1970s made use of it, like the UAC TurboTrain, the concept was not widely used.

=== APT's origins ===
In 1964, a number of BR's formerly-dispersed research groups were organised into the new Derby Research Division. It was here that the final work on Wickens' HSFV was being developed. At first there was some argument about whether or not a high-speed train would be supported; in the aftermath of the 1963 Beeching Axe it was not clear what size of network the government was willing to support, and whether a new design should be aimed at higher-speed intercity service, where a new locomotive would be needed to replace the ageing Deltics anyway, or a simpler system for better performance in the suburbs.

In 1965, Wickens had hired an intern, Dutch engineer A.J. Ispeert, and had him do some early work on active tilt systems. These would replace the passive pendulum-like Talgo system with a system using hydraulic cylinders that would quickly drive the car to the proper angle and hold it there without any swinging. A major advantage for BR use was that the center of rotation could be through the middle of the car, instead of the top, meaning the total movement would fit within the smaller British loading gauge. Ispeert returned a report on the concept in August 1966.

Wickens noted that BR's single-axle suspension system would have less drag at high speed, and that its lighter weight would make it more stable at high speeds than conventional dual-axle bogies. In November 1966 he wrote a report calling for a two-year programme to build and test a High Speed Passenger Vehicle, essentially an experimental car like HSFV-1 but for passenger use instead of freight. The original plans called for a single dummy body and two bogies to test the suspension and tilting system at high speed. They set the maximum tilt angle at 9 degrees, which could be added to any cant in the underlying railbed.

The design programme was organised under Mike Newman, while Alastair Gilchrist headed the research side. Newman noted that a single car was unlikely to answer practical questions like how the train would operate as a complete unit, and that a dummy body would not answer the question of whether the tilt mechanism could really be built under the floor without projecting into the cabin. Accordingly, later that same November, Newman and Wickens drew up plans for a complete experimental train with the design goal to be not only to study the tilt system, but do so on actual lines.

Wickens took the plans to Sydney Jones, who immediately took up the idea. They set the performance goal at the nicely rounded figure of 250 km/h (155 mph). In keeping with BR management goals to provide quicker travel times rather than just faster speeds, they also required the train to round corners 40% faster. They named the proposal the Advanced Passenger Train. Jones took the proposal to the BR chairman, Stanley Raymond, who liked the idea. However, the board was unable to provide enough funding to develop it, and encouraged Jones to approach the Ministry of Transport for additional funding.

Jones did so, and spent the next two years walking the corridors of Whitehall when one civil servant after another agreed that it was a great idea but that it was really the job of someone else to approve it. In spite of being repeatedly put off, Jones persisted, especially with Government Chief Scientist, Solly Zuckerman, to arrange a stable funding system for the entire topic of railway research. This was finalised as the Joint Programme between the Ministry of Transport and the British Railways Board, sharing the costs 50:50. The Programme would run sixteen years from January 1969 to March 1985. The first two programmes were APT and the Train Control Project.

=== Finalising the design ===
Another of Jones' many goals for the APT was that it would not cause additional wear on the lines. Instantaneous loads on the railbed vary with the square of speed, so a faster train would greatly increase road wear. Offsetting this effect required the train to meet stringent weight limits, and eliminated the possibility of using conventional diesel engines, which were simply too heavy. The team selected gas turbine power as the solution, initially considering the Rolls-Royce Dart.

When the funding was secured a number of design notes were still not finalised, so the timeline was stretched into July 1971 to provide extra time for the project definition stage. By May 1969 these issues had been decided and the final design emerged. The experimental train would have four cars; two power cars placed at either end, and two passenger cars between them filled with experimental measurement and recording systems. During the time Jones was arranging funding, an experimental engine built by Leyland for trucks became available, which was designed to be much less expensive. The Dart was dropped, and power would be supplied by four 300 horsepower (220 kW) Leyland 2S/350 gas turbines in each power car, along with a fifth turbine connected to a generator to power the equipment in the passenger cars. During the testing period the engines were progressively upgraded to 330 horsepower (250 kW).

After many months studying various transmission systems, with time on the definition phase ending they finally decided to use an electric transmission, like a diesel-electric locomotive. Finally, due to schedule pressure, it was decided not to use a single articulated bogie between the cars, and two conventional bogies would be used on each car. Jim Wildhamer, recently hired from Westland Helicopters, designed a space-frame body for the power cars based on welded steel tube instead of the semi-monocoque construction used on the passenger cars.

Contracts for the various parts of the design were sent out in July 1969. Hawker Siddeley Dynamics won the contract for the suspensions and braking systems, GEC and English Electric won the contract for the trailer cars, and by this time Leyland had already been selected for the engines. Over time a number of these contracts were withdrawn and the teams took the design in-house, cancelling the suspensions contract with Hawker Siddeley in February 1970. Design of the bogies was taken over with the physical construction contracted to British Rail Engineering, while the power car construction was let to Metro-Cammell.

While this was underway, work on an experiential facility for the design also started. Sited behind the main offices at the Derby labs, Kelvin House, the new facilities included a roller rig for testing the engines, a brake dynamometer and various test rigs for testing the suspension and tilt systems. The new lab was opened on 26 October 1970. Additionally, a 13.25 miles (21.32 km) section of track between Melton Mowbray and Edwalton was purchased as a test track. This was originally the main line to Nottingham, but now redundant after the Beeching Axe. This contained a 3 miles (4.8 km) straight section, many curves, and several tight tunnels that would be useful for aerodynamics tests. A set of maintenance buildings were built along this line at Old Dalby, and the line as a whole became known as the Old Dalby Test Track.

=== POP ===
Although construction of the train was relatively straightforward, a number of more serious problems appeared in the power and control systems. Thus the decision was made to build two additional power cars as unfinished frameworks with no power. These cars would instead be hauled by conventional locomotives to provide data on the tilting and braking systems as well as the dynamics of the vehicles. A contract for the additional two cars was sent out on 14 April 1970, and ran for the first time in September 1971. The name "POP" was assigned, an acronym for "power-zero-power", indicating the two power car layout with no passenger cars in the middle.

The selection of a space frame design for the power cars turned out to be fortunate, as during construction the engineers concluded that the packaging of the various elements within the car would render it dynamically unstable. They needed more room to spread the parts out, so the decision was made to roughly double the length of the power cars. This turned out to be easy to do; the frameworks already under construction at Metro-Cammell simply had additional sections of steel tube inserted and construction was barely affected.

The POP cars were skinless, topped with a space frame holding ballast to simulate the various parts of the prospective design. The "POP" acronym was soon rendered inaccurate when a passenger car was added to make a three-car train, at which time the power cars were also given bodies. The POP underwent a number of changes, notably trialling different bogie designs, over its lifetime.

=== APT-E ===
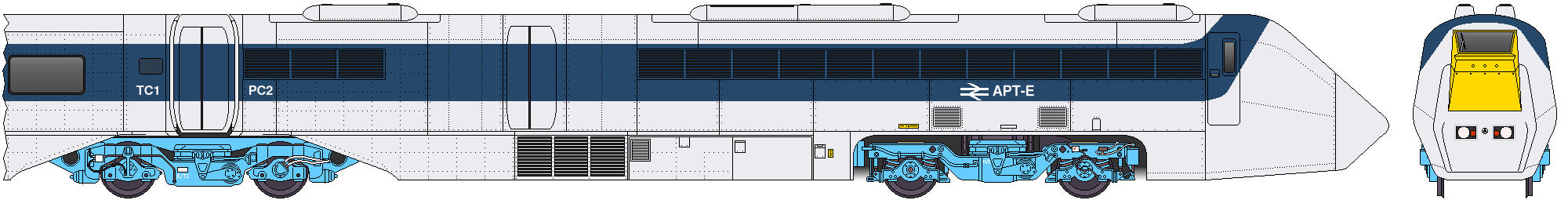
APT-E Power Car PC2 and Trailer Car TC1

While POP was proving the basic concepts, construction of the test train continued at the Derby lab. The set was sufficiently complete by late 1971 for an official naming ceremony, where it became the APT-E (for Experimental). It made its first low-speed run from Derby to Duffield on 25 July 1972. Upon reaching Duffield, the ASLEF union immediately "blacked" it, forbidding their members from doing any work involving the train. Their complaint was that the APT-E had a single operator's chair, which they took as evidence that BR was moving to single operator trains. A friendly inspector helped the team move the train back to Derby at night. This resulted in a one-day national strike that cost more than the entire APT-E project.

By this point the POP had demonstrated a number of problems, and the engineers took the opportunity to start a major overhaul of the design. The main problem was the design of the non-driven bogies, which were not stable and could not be used for high speed runs. One power car was retained at the lab while the other and the two passenger cars were sent to the nearby Derby Works for modification. The main changes were to stiffen the power cars and replace the suspect bogies with a version of the powered bogie with the motors removed. Other changes included the removal of the ceramic recuperators from the turbines for reliability reasons, although this dramatically increased fuel use, and the addition of a small seating area to the passenger car for VIP use.

Contract negotiations over high speed rail had concluded in the summer of 1973, just in time for the modified three-car APT-E to emerge from the shop in August 1973. The train then started a testing series lasting eight months, covering details of the suspension, braking, curve performance and drag. However, reliability was a serious problem and it returned to the shops for a second overhaul in March 1974. Among the many changes for this round was the switching of the turbines formerly dedicated to power delivery for the passenger cars to add additional power to the traction motors, while at the same time replacing all of the turbines with an upgraded 330 horsepower (250 kW) version, improving total power per car from 1,200 to 1,650 horsepower (890 to 1,230 kW). Other changes included new motor bearings and the return and similar modification of the second power car, formerly used at the lab.

The rebuilt four car train returned to service in June 1974. On 10 August 1975 it hit 152.3 mph (245.1 km/h) on the Western Region between Swindon and Reading, setting the UK record. It then set the route record from Leicester to London St. Pancras in 58 minutes 30 seconds on 30 October 1975, at an average speed of just over 101 miles per hour (163 km/h) through this twisty route. It was also tested extensively on the Midland Main Line out of St. Pancras and on the Old Dalby Test Track, where in January 1976 it attained a speed of 143.6 mph (231.1 km/h).

APT-E testing ended in 1976, and the single train was sent directly to the National Railway Museum in York on 11 June 1976. During its testing it covered approximately 23,500 miles (37,800 km), ending a career that is considered a success, but the train could not be said to have been extensively tested; in three years it covered less distance than the average family car would in that period. In comparison, the first TGV prototype, TGV 001, also powered by gas turbines, covered 320,000 kilometres (200,000 mi) between 1972 and 1976.

=== Move to electrification ===
While APT-E was still under construction, the team was well into the design of a production version. Jones found an ally in Graham Calder, who had been promoted to become BR's chief mechanical engineer (CME) in 1971. At the time they envisioned building two new experimental trains; one was essentially a stretched version of the APT-E with turbine power, and the other was similar, but powered by overhead electrical lines via pantograph (pan).

As data flowed in from the POP and APT-E, a number of changes to the design were being made. Among the more problematic changes was Leyland's exit from the turbine market, having concluded that the concept of a turbine powered truck was not economically feasible. The company agreed to continue supporting the project anyway, including the release of a more powerful 350 horsepower (260 kW) version, but made it clear a production design would have to find another solution. In November 1972, the plans changed to build four electric versions for operation on the WCML, and another two turbine versions. From that point the turbine versions fell progressively further behind, and were eventually cancelled.

This may have been a blessing in disguise; the 1973 oil crisis caused fuel prices to rise as much as three times, and turbine engines were notoriously thirsty; the TurboTrain used between 50 and 100% more fuel than conventional sets running on the same routes. Leyland's use of a recuperator improved this considerably, but proved a maintenance problem.

=== Design review ===
With the decision to move primarily to electrification made in November 1972, Jones began building a larger management team to carry the design forward to service. This resulted in the April 1973 transfer of the design from the research division to the Office of the Chief Mechanical and Electrical Engineer. A review was carried out by a joint team from the two divisions, led by David Boocock.

As a result of this review a number of additional changes were made to the design. A major problem was the recent discovery that the overhead lines on the WCML were subject to the creation of large waves in the lines at speeds over 200 kilometres per hour (120 mph). This was not a problem for two trains following each other with a spacing of several kilometers, but was a serious problem for a single train with pantographs at both ends. The obvious solution was to use a single pantograph at the front or back and then run the power between the cars but this option could not be pursued because of concerns over the presence of 25 kV power on the passenger cars. (Note: Sources disagree on the nature of the problem of running power along the train. Wickens states this was a safety concern, while Williams states it was due to the difficulty of designing a coupling between the cars that could handle the case of the two cars being at different tilt angles - only the center of the cars would remain at the same relative alignment, not the top or bottom. These may not be different issues; because the only point that was guaranteed to be at the same angle between two cars were the shared bogies at either end, the power cabling would have to either run under the cars, or from the roof down to the bogies and back up again repeatedly, which would carry the cabling though the passenger compartment.)

Some consideration was given to placing both engines back-to-back at one end of the train, but concerns were raised over excessive buckling forces when pushing the train at high speeds with the tilt feature active. So, finally, the design team chose to place the engines back-to-back in the centre of the train. The two engines would be identical and both would carry a pantograph to pick up power, but in normal operation only the rear of the two engines would raise its pantograph, and the other engine would be fed power through a coupling along the roof. Power was converted to direct current by ASEA thyristors, supplying four 1 megawatt (1,300 hp) DC traction motors mounted in each power car. The traction motors were moved from the bogies to inside the car body, thereby reducing unsprung weight. The motors transmitted their power through internal gearboxes, cardan shafts and quill final drives.

Other changes suggested by experience on APT-E included changes to the vertical suspension from conventional hydraulic shock absorbers to air bags, which would both improve the ride quality and have lower maintenance requirements. For service reasons, the power cars were redesigned to have their own bogies in a Bo-Bo arrangement, so they could be easily removed from the train, unlike the former articulated design that connected adjacent cars together and made it difficult to split the train apart. The passenger cars retained the articulated design, but a number of changes were made due to experience on APT-E. Finally, a system that would cause the tilt system to fail into the upright position was desired, as APT-E had failed into a tilted position on several occasions.

As part of the same review, the team noticed that a slight reduction in maximum speed would greatly simplify a number of design points, and eliminated the need for the hydrokinetic brakes. However, the decision was made to go ahead with the original specification in order to provide the maximum possible speed. The government agreed to pay 80% of the cost of eight trains.

=== HST vs. APT ===
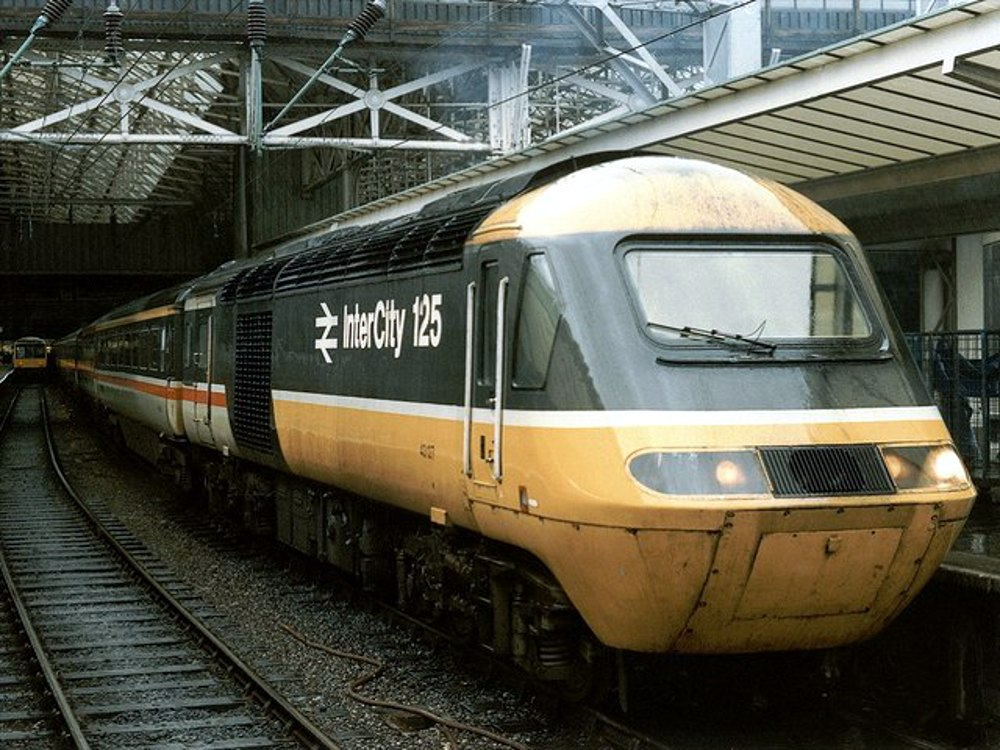
In contrast to APT, HST was a huge success.

It was during this time that other groups within BR began to agitate against APT, saying it was simply too large a step to make in a single design. They proposed building a much simpler design, powered by conventional diesels and lacking tilt, but capable of speeds of up to 125 mph (201 km/h) and able to run anywhere on the BR network. This emerged in 1970 as the High Speed Train (HST), and development proceeded rapidly.

As the APT programme continued, management began infighting. Experienced engineering resources were withheld from the APT project, using them instead to press ahead as swiftly as possible with what they saw as a conventional rival to APT. As it appeared the HST would be a relatively sure bet, BR's board of directors dithered on the APT project, eventually cutting the number of trains to four. This was later cut to three by the government in a 1974 round of budget cuts.

=== APT-P ===
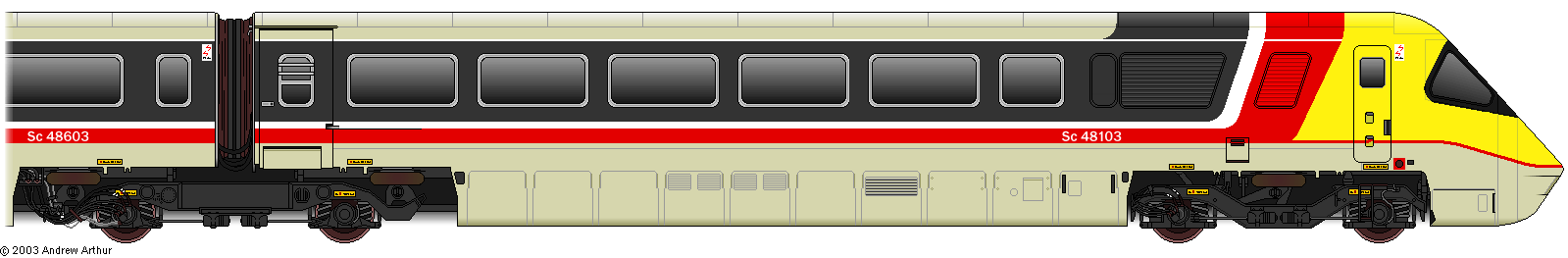
APT-P Driving Trailer Second (DTS) unit, in revised APT branding, with a black "mask" around the driver's window

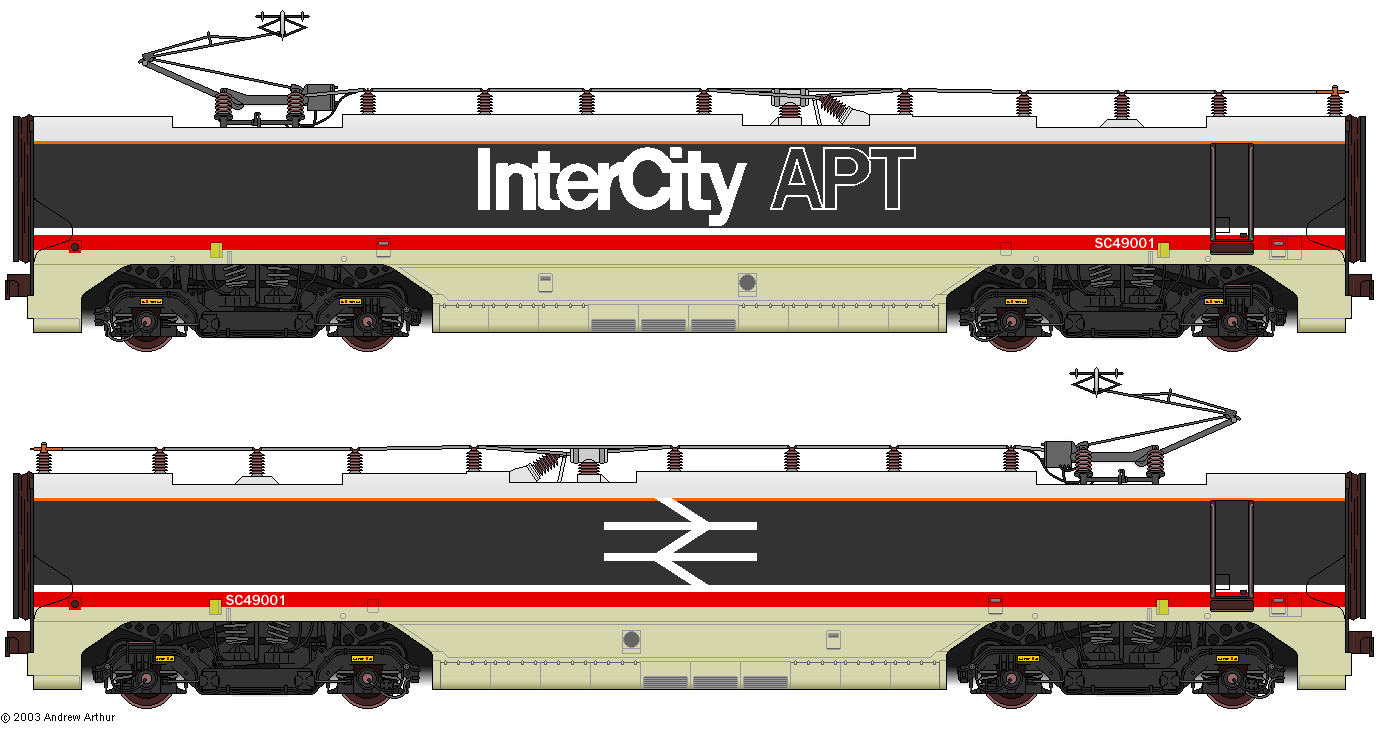
APT-P Non-Driving Motor (NDM) unit, with Stone Faiveley AMBR pantograph

Although the centre-motor layout was the simplest in terms of solving the immediate technical problems, it would cause significant problems in operational terms. There was a passage through the power cars that connected the two-halves of the train, but it was noisy, cramped and not permitted for passengers. Instead, each end of the train now required its own dining car and similar facilities. The split design also presented problems in the stations, where only the two ends of the platforms could now be used, whereas normal equipment could park with the locomotives off the end of the platform.

Although all auxiliary equipment such as lighting, air conditioning and air compressors was powered by motor alternators driven from the 25 kV overhead line, it was recognised that if there were a power failure, conditions in the passenger vehicles would quickly become unbearable and even unsafe. Each driving van trailer i.e. the leading and trailing vehicles, was equipped with a diesel-alternator generator capable of supplying the minimum requirement of auxiliary power. The diesel-alternators were started using air motors powered from the train's air system, since the APT carried few batteries.

The APT was designed for faster running than existing trains on the same track. At the APT's design speeds, it was not possible for the operator to read the speed limits on trackside signs in time to slow down if needed. Instead, a new system using a transponder-based cab display was introduced called "C-APT". A radio signal from the train caused a track-mounted transponder to return the local speed limit. These sealed, unpowered transponders were placed at intervals of no more than 1 km. Approaching speed restrictions were provided at the appropriate distance, along with an audible alert; failure to acknowledge these alerts would result in an automatic brake application. C-APT was driven by a redundant onboard computer system using Intel 4004 microprocessors. The track units were essentially the same as the modern French Balise beacons.

The hydrokinetic brake system was successful and reliable on the APT-E and was retained for the APT-P with a number of design improvements from the lessons learnt on APT-E. However, as an energy-cutting measure, the hydraulically actuated friction brakes used for low speed were modified to be fed by a passive hydraulic intensifier rather than a hydraulic power pack.

=== Service testing ===
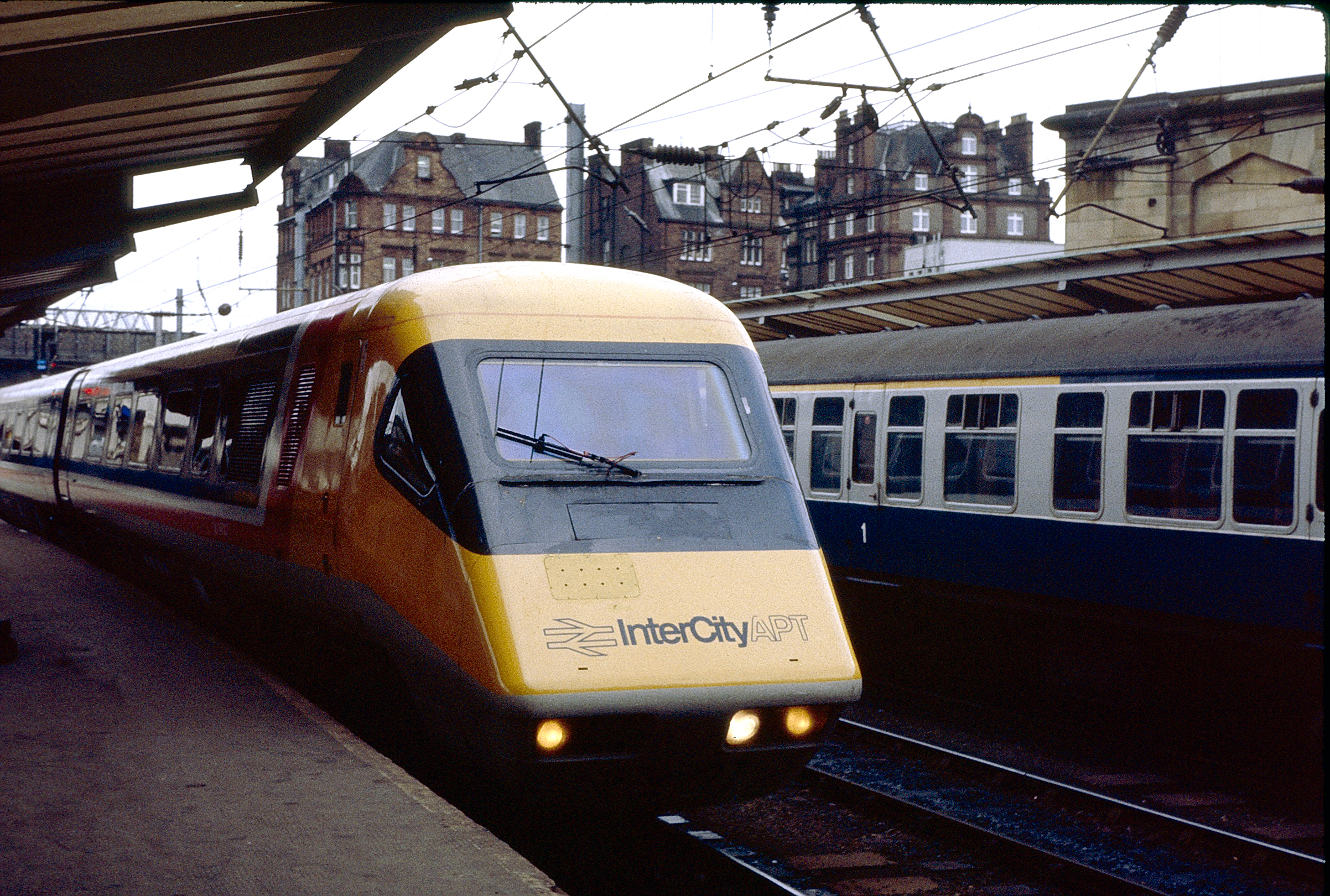
An APT-P at Carlisle in 1983

Although APT-P used much of the technology developed on the APT-E, construction of the first APT-P was delayed several times. The first power car was delivered from the Derby locomotive works in June 1977, and the first passenger cars on 7 June 1978, a year late. The first complete train was not ready until May 1979. It entered testing soon after, and set the UK speed record at 162.2 miles per hour (261.0 km/h) in December 1979, a record that stood until beaten by a Class 373 Eurostar in July 2003. Two additional examples were delivered, each with minor changes, one in late 1979, and the last in 1980. Initially proposed in the 1960s, and given the go-ahead in the early 1970s, the design was now significantly late.

Long delays in the production of the prototype meant that the brake units had to be stored for an extended period before being installed. The change from oil to water-glycol mix required the cylinders to be covered internally with an anti-corrosion coating, which broke down during storage. In testing the cylinders repeatedly failed, and the loss of pressure caused the train to take nearly as long to slow from 25 mph to a standstill as it did to slow from 125 mph to 25 mph. During commissioning, because of this and other development issues, every axle on the trains was modified and exchanged.

The compressed air systems that actuated the brakes and powered the doors and other moving parts was another source of problems. The air piping would normally be run in such a way that there were natural low points where water condensing out of the air would collect and could be removed. On APT these runs were tortuous, and resulted in numerous points where the water would collect, and in cold weather, freeze. The commissioning team found a Westinghouse designed solution that would eliminate the water being produced by the compressors, but the design team would not accept the solution. They stated that the problem would not occur with a full train formation, as opposed to the shorter formation used in commissioning.

Finally, it was only discovered at the APT-P commissioning stage that parts of the WCML had been built in such a way that, if two APT-P trains with their tilt systems failed and the carriages stuck in the inward tilted position met, they would strike one another. The railway had not been built with tilting trains in mind, and the dynamic envelopes were too small for a tilted APT. The effect was not seen with conventional trains since, without tilt, their movements stayed well within the dynamic envelope.

Adding to the problems, in 1980 another reorganisation resulted in the disbanding of the APT team, leaving responsibility for the project spread across several divisions.

== In service ==
=== Queasy rider ===
While the commissioning team continued to report, and solve, problems in the APT design, BR management was under increasing pressure from the press. By the early 1980s the project had been running for over a decade and the trains were still not in service. Private Eye lampooned it with a timetable proclaiming "The APT arriving at Platform 4 is fifteen years late". Press pressure led to political pressure which led to management pressure, and the APT team was told to put the train into operation in spite of its ongoing problems.

On 7 December 1981 the press was invited aboard APT for its first official run from Glasgow to London, during which it set a schedule record at 4 hours 15 minutes. However, press reports focused on a distinct sickening sensation from the tilt system, and nicknamed APT the "queasy rider". They also reported that the stewardess, Marie Docherty, suggested the solution was to "just stand with your feet apart." A BR engineer suggested that the reporters were simply too drunk on BR's free alcohol. On its return trip from London the next day, one of the coaches became stuck in a rotated position when the tilt system failed, and this was heavily reported in the press. Two days later, the temperature dipped and the water in the hydrokinetic brakes froze, forcing the train to end service in Crewe.

APT became the focus of a storm of negative press reporting. When it emerged that only two of the three APT-Ps were in operation and the third would be out of service for overhaul and maintenance, the press dubbed it the "Accident Prone Train". BR also ran a second train 15 minutes behind it in case it failed, and since the train was mixed among existing traffic, its speed was limited to 125 mph instead of its full speed.

BR, desperate for some good publicity, hired former Blue Peter presenter Peter Purves to make the journey from Glasgow. On arrival at Euston, Purves said that he had had an "excellent breakfast in the most delightful surroundings", and when asked about the train, said "it's smooth, it's quiet, and an altogether delightful experience." However, as he said this, a slight shudder was visible, and the sound of rattling dishes could be heard.

=== Further development ===
In 1981, BR hired the consulting firm Ford & Dain Partners to produce a report on the APT project and make any suggestions to improve it. It produced an interim report in November 1981, and a final version that December. Their reports first suggested that the technical aspects of the design were largely complete, although they drew attention to the braking system, but that the management structure was a serious problem and there had to be a single manager in charge of the entire project. This resulted in the appointment of John Mitchell to the position of manager of the APT. Matters immediately improved.

Among the improvements was a fix for the motion sickness being experienced by passengers. The commissioning team had been well aware of this problem before it entered service, but this was not mentioned to the press when it was noticed on the public runs. The problem was due to two effects. One was that the control system did not respond instantly, so the cars tended to not respond when the curve first started, and then reacted rapidly to make up for this lag. The fix for this was to take information on the tilt from the car in front, giving the system the slight time advantage it needed. The other problem was similar to sea sickness, but in reverse. Sea sickness is caused when the body's equilibrioception system can feel movement, but inside a closed room this movement cannot be seen. On APT, one could easily see the tilting as the train entered turns, but there was no perception of this motion. The result was the same, a confusion between the visual and the equilibrioception system. The solution was almost trivial: slightly reducing the amount of tilt to be deliberately less than needed resulted in a small amount of leftover centrifugal force that was perceived by the equilibrioception system as being perfectly natural, which proved to cure the effect.

This also led to a further embarrassing discovery. The work that suggested the amount of tilt needed to reduce the lateral forces to acceptable levels was eventually traced to a short series of studies carried out by a steam train on a branch line in northern Wales in 1949. A series of updated studies carried out in 1983 demonstrated less tilt was needed, about six degrees. This was within the range possible through superelevation, which suggested tilting might not be needed at all.

=== Re-entry - and demise ===
The APT-P trains were quietly reintroduced into service in mid-1984, but not mentioned as such on any of the timetables; passengers would find out if they were taking APT only when it arrived at the platform. These trains proved to work well, the problems having apparently been corrected. However, the political and managerial will to continue the project and build the projected 140 mph capable APT-S production vehicles had evaporated.

Meanwhile, HST entered service as the InterCity 125 in 1976 and proved to be an all-round success. Its diesel operation and slightly lower speeds also meant it could operate on more of BR's network. Pressure to abandon APT in favour of HST was continual. Supporters of the APT were increasingly isolated, and the system was removed from service in the winter of 1985/6. This was made formal in 1987, when the trains were broken up and sent to museums.

One APT-P set was kept at Glasgow Shields depot and found use once or twice as an EMU to take journalists from Glasgow Central to Anderston railway station and back, for the Scottish Exhibition and Conference Centre. A second APT-P was stored in a siding behind Crewe Works. The Glasgow APT-P and the third APT-P were scrapped without publicity.

== Examination ==
The failure of the APT project saw extensive reporting in the 1980s, and has remained a topic of some discussion since then. Writers generally agree that the technical aspects of the design were largely solved by the time of their second service introduction, and put most of the blame for the delays on the shifting management structures and infighting within BR between APT and HST. There have also been concerns that carrying out development within BR was a major problem of its own, because this meant their industrial partners had no buy-in and their years of practical experience were being ignored.

The development timeline is also a topic of considerable discussion. In comparison, the Canadian LRC train began development at the same time as APT, developed a unique active tilting system of its own, and entered production in the late 1970s. Like APT, LRC also faced teething problems that took some time before they were solved, and was subject to some press chiding over these failures. Unlike APT, LRC had no competition and management was in a hurry to remove the Turbo from service. The system was given the time it needed to mature with no serious possibility of cancellation.

The slow pace of APT development has been blamed on the shoestring budget of £50 million over 15 years, although the press of the era dismissed this as too high. This number has been compared to the roughly £100 million spent by British Leyland to develop the Austin Mini Metro, a project that was technically trivial in comparison to APT.

== Legacy ==
Alan Williams notes that work continued on a new variant, the APT-U (APT-Update). This was essentially APT-P with the tilt system made optional and the engines repositioned at either end of the train with power couplings running between them. That project was later retitled InterCity 225 (IC225), perhaps to distance it from the bad publicity surrounding the APT-P. The Mark 4 coach design that was introduced as part of the new IC225 sets for the East Coast Main Line electrification allowed the retrofitting of the tilt mechanism, although this was never implemented. The Class 91 locomotives that power the IC225s had design features "imported wholesale" from the APT-P power cars, including body- rather than bogie-mounted traction motors to reduce unsprung load, and having the transformer below rather than on top of the underframe to reduce the centre of gravity. Unlike the APT-P power cars, though, they were never intended to tilt.

In 1976 Fiat Ferroviaria built the ETR 401 trainset, a tilting train using an active system with 10 degrees of tilting that used gyroscopes to detect the corner in its early phases in order to have a more punctual and comfortable inclination: this is why the FIAT project has been successful since the '70s. In 1982 FIAT bought some APT patents that were used to improve their technology for the ETR 450 trainsets.

The introduction of the Squadron fleet designated APT-S did not occur as had been originally envisaged. The APT project succumbed to an insufficient political will in the United Kingdom to persist in solving the teething difficulties experienced with the many immature technologies necessary for a groundbreaking project of this nature. The decision not to proceed was made against a backdrop of negative public perceptions shaped by media coverage of the time. The APT is acknowledged as a milestone in the development of the current generation of tilting high speed trains. 25 years later on an upgraded infrastructure the Class 390 Pendolinos now match the APT's scheduled timings. The London to Glasgow route by APT (1980/81 timetable) was 4hrs 10min, the same time as the fastest Pendolino timing (December 2008 timetable).

In 2006, on a one off non-stop run for charity, a Pendolino completed the Glasgow to London journey in 3hrs 55min, whereas the APT completed the opposite London to Glasgow journey in 3hrs 52min in 1984.

On 17 June 2021, a Pendolino named Royal Scot and operated by Avanti West Coast ran an attempt to beat the record but fell short of the record time by only 21 seconds. The nine-carriage train travelled non-stop at an average speed of 103 mph on the 401-mile route.

Continued analysis of the data collected during the project led to a better understanding of the causes of track wear and the need to reduce unsprung mass rather than reduce the overall weight of the carriage. This led to the development of the BREL P3/T3 for the British Rail Class 365 and British Rail Class 465, which among other improvements featured smaller radius wheels. BREL further developed the concept to produce the Advanced Suburban Bogie which was a factor in ABB acquisition of BREL.

== APT today ==
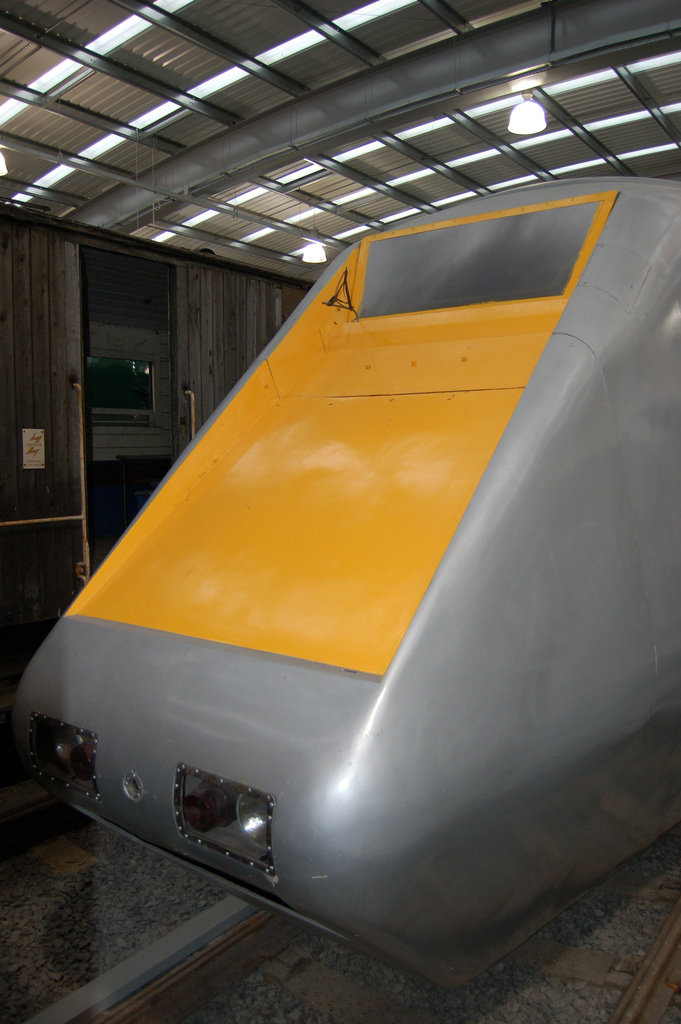
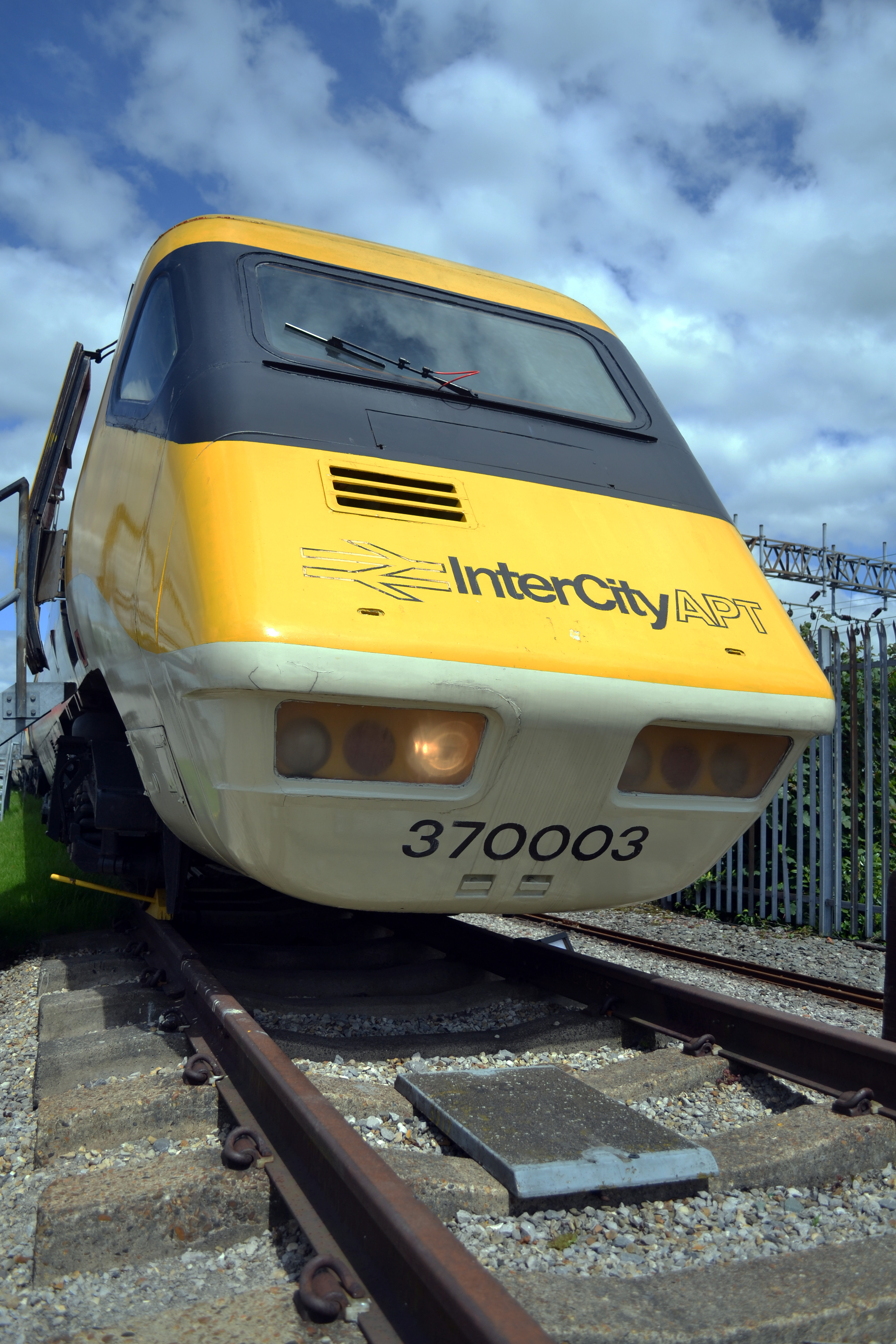
The APT-E (left) at Locomotion, Shildon, County Durham, and the surviving APT-P (right) at Crewe Heritage Centre

The APT-E unit is now owned by the National Railway Museum and is on display at its Locomotion museum at Shildon in County Durham. An APT-P unit is now on display at Crewe Heritage Centre and can be seen from trains passing on the adjacent West Coast Main Line along with APT-P power car number 49006 which arrived in March 2018 after seven years at the Electric Railway Museum near Coventry.

During special events, the driving trailer 370003 offers a "tilt" experience which involves tilting the coach when it is static.
