= Crewe Heritage Centre =

Railway museum in Cheshire, England

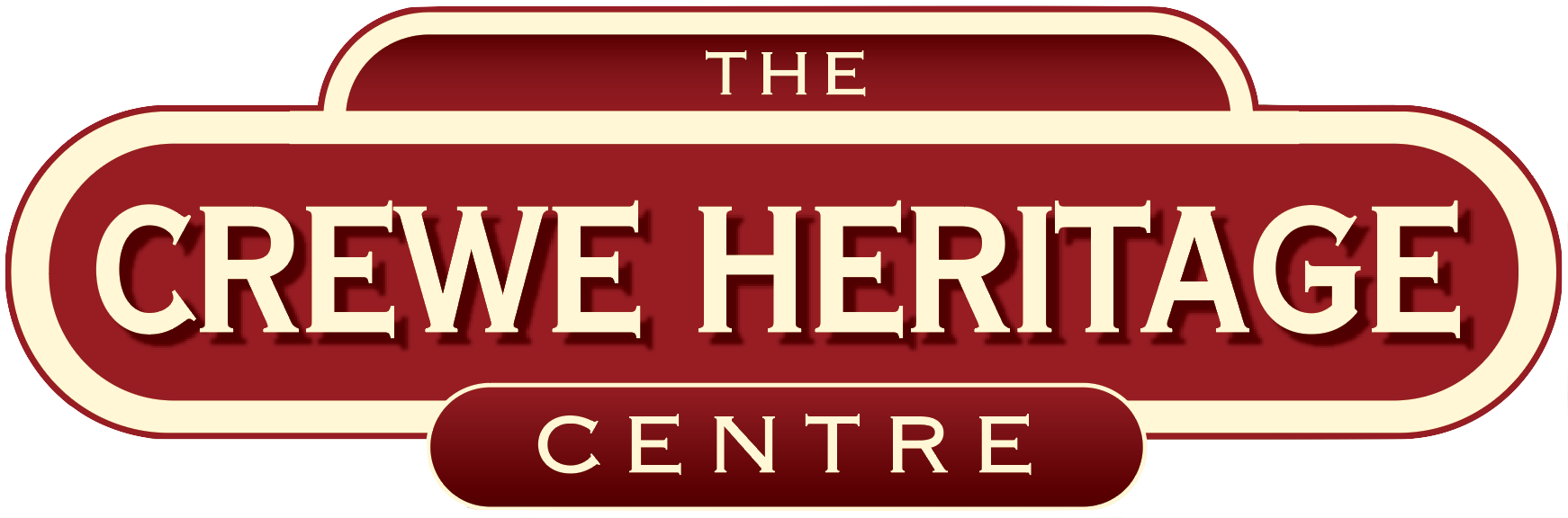
- "Get on Track for a Great Day Out"
- Former name: Crewe Railway Age
- Established: 24 July 1987; 39 years ago
- Location: Vernon Way, Crewe, Cheshire, England
- Coordinates: 53.0938°N 2.4360°W
- Type: Railway museum
- Chairperson: Rob Wykes
- Owner: Crewe Heritage Trust Limited
- Website: https://www.crewehc.co.uk

Crewe Heritage Centre is a railway museum in Crewe, Cheshire, England. Managed by the Crewe Heritage Trust, the museum is located between the railway station and the town centre; the site was the location of the original Locomotive Works, which was demolished in the early 1980s.

== History ==
The centre was established in the old London, Midland and Scottish Railway yard, which was once part of Crewe Works, between the junction to Chester and the West Coast Main Line. It was officially opened by Queen Elizabeth II, accompanied by the Duke of Edinburgh, on 24 July 1987. It was renamed Crewe Railway Age in 1992 by the owning registered charity; however, after the management of the centre was taken over by a new group of volunteers, the museum returned to its original name in early 2008.

== Exhibits ==
The centre has a series of exhibits, ranging from the only surviving APT-P train, a miniature railway, model railways and three open signal boxes, with a varied collection of standard gauge steam, diesel and electric locomotives; occasional visiting locomotives are also on show. The main Exhibition Hall features many artefacts and exhibits associated with Crewe, from its locomotive and carriage construction to its famous junction railway station.

=== Advanced Passenger Train ===
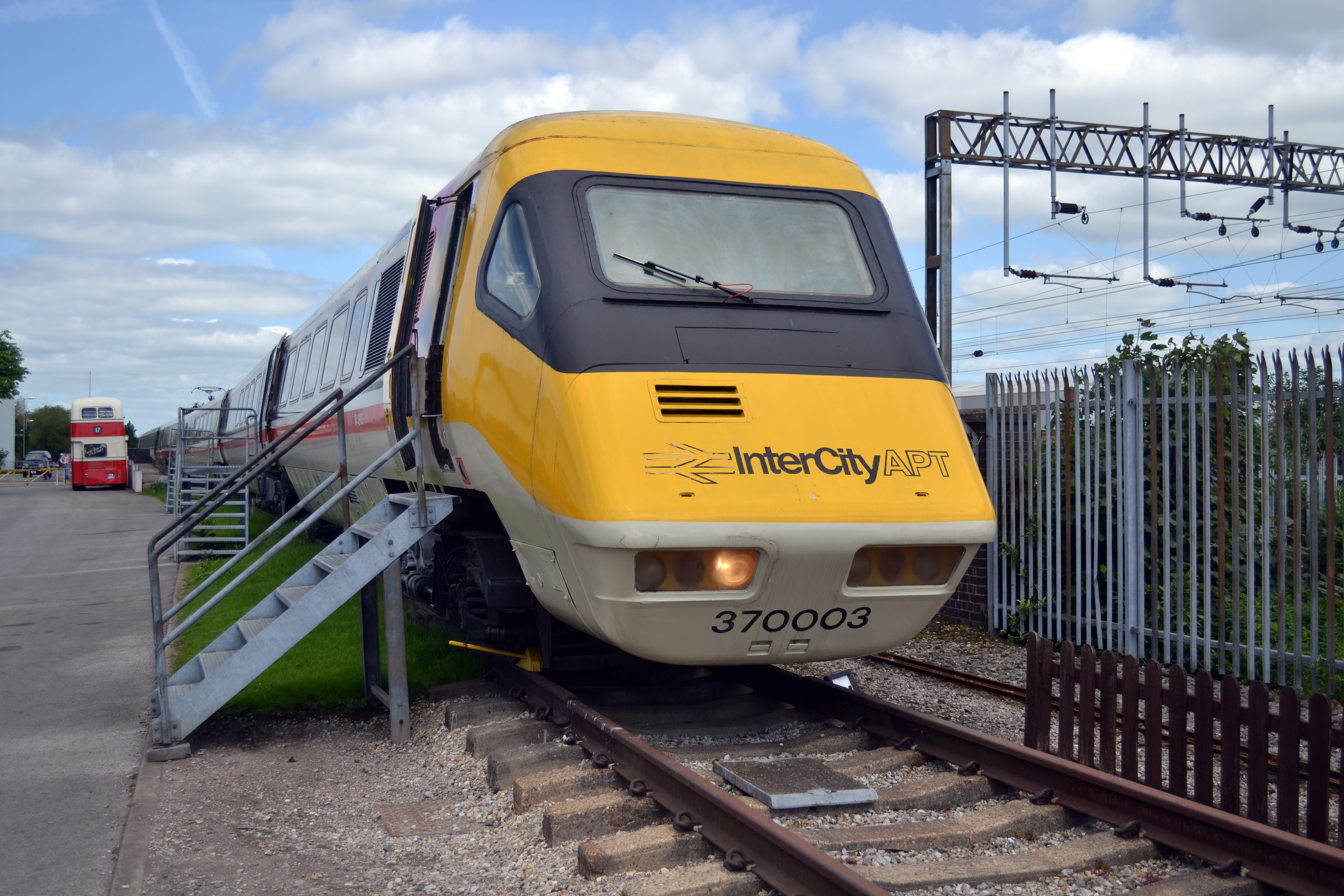
APT no. 370 003/006 at Crewe Heritage Centre

Built by British Rail (BR) in the 1970s and 1980s, this Class 370 Advanced Passenger Train (APT) is the only surviving APT-P set. It is open at all times, with an occasional cafe run from the original buffet car on selected days only. The APT-P museum can be found inside one of the carriages, with photographs on display from the project. The set was tilted for the first time in preservation in 2013. In early 2018, an additional surviving power car (M49006) arrived at the museum. It is displayed separately alongside the main set.

=== Miniature railway ===
Constructed in 1992, the miniature railway is a 600 m (1,969 ft) long 184 mm (7 in) gauge ride, which takes visitors from Crewe Old Works to Spider Bridge, via Forge End, with the optional return journey. The railway includes a mixture of steam, petrol and battery electric locomotives; rides on this attraction are included in the museum admission price.

=== Exhibition Hall ===
The Heritage Centre is also home to the 1,000 m^{2} (10,764 ft^{2}) Exhibition Hall, which doubles both as an event space and as the main museum building. It features displays and exhibits about the town of Crewe.

During the 2018/19 closed season, the building underwent a light refurbishment; this included replacement of the original 1987 entrance doors and a full internal repaint.

=== Signal boxes ===
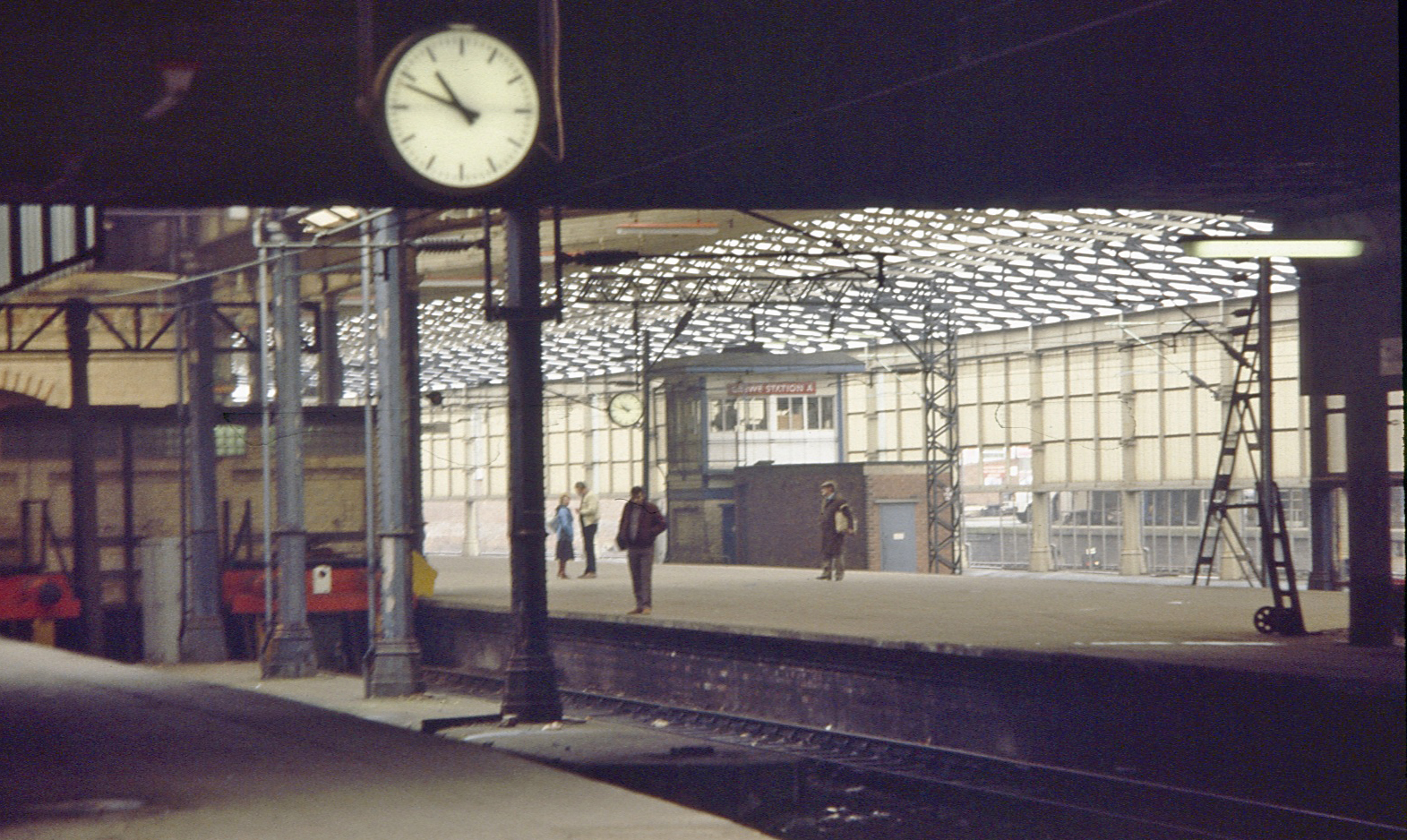
Crewe Station 'A' Box in 1983

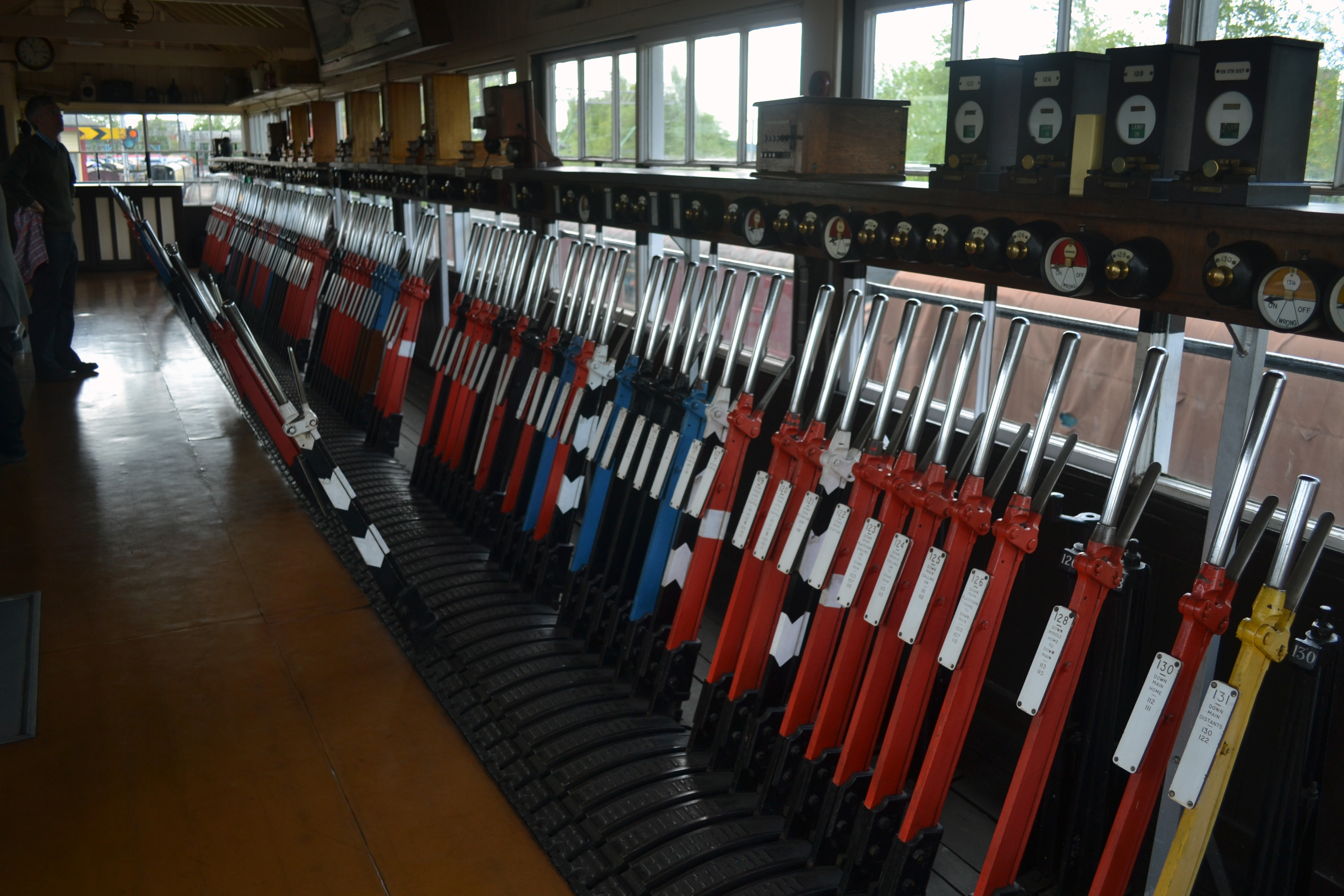
Levers of Exeter West signal box, as preserved at the museum

There are three signal boxes on site:

- Crewe Station A: open for display purposes, this box was moved onto the site after its closure in 1985.
- Crewe North Junction: built in 1939 and designed to withstand the Luftwaffe bombs of World War II, the box is constructed out of concrete and has an 46 cm (18 in) thick roof and 38 cm (15 in) thick walls. Located between the West Coast Main Line and Crewe-Chester line, its location is perfect for viewing passing main line trains. Demonstrations of how the box was used often take place and are linked to a simulator. In 1987, the building was extended to provide more room for the Heritage Centre, including a cafe and small shop, and to include a large US model railway.
- Exeter West: used to control the split at Exeter St Davids between the Great Western Railway and the Southern Railway. With 131 levers, it was a Special Class A signal box, with only the best signalmen authorised to operate it. Since being rebuilt at Crewe, volunteers operate it on every weekend using a demonstration 1960s timetable; this includes the hectic Summer Saturday service, which saw famous expresses such as the Torbay Express, Atlantic Coast Express and the Cornishman.

== Examples of stock held ==
Class	Number	Previous number	Pictures of the same / similar exhibits	Built	Owner	Type	Livery	Status
Class 03	03073	D2073	A similar example to 03073	1959	Crewe Heritage Trust	Diesel shunter	BR Blue	Exhibit; in use
Class 37	37108	D6808	37108 in its current livery	1961	Private owner	Diesel locomotive	BR Blue	Exhibit; not currently on site
Class 43 (HST)	43018	N/A	Three power cars in 43018's current livery	1976	Crewe Heritage Trust	Diesel locomotive	BR Blue	Static exhibit
Class 43 (HST)	43081	N/A	43043 in 43081's current livery	1978	Crewe Heritage Trust	Diesel locomotive	East Midlands Trains	Working exhibit; donated by Porterbrook. Chosen for preservation due to being the 8000th locomotive manufactured at Crewe Works
Class 47	47192	D1842	47192 in its current livery	1965	Crewe Heritage Trust	Diesel locomotive	BR Green	Working exhibit; currently on hire to the Ecclesbourne Valley Railway
Class 87	87035	N/A	87035 Robert Burns in BR Blue livery at the museum	1974	Crewe Heritage Trust	AC Electric locomotive	Virgin Trains	Static exhibit
Class 90	90050	90150	90047 in 90050's current livery	1990	Freightliner	AC Electric locomotive	Railfreight Distribution / Freightliner grey	Static exhibit; on long-term loan
Class 91	91120	91020	91117 in 91120's current livery	1990	Europhoenix	AC Electric locomotive	Europhoenix	Static exhibit; on long-term loan
Class 370 (APT)	370 003/006	N/A	The APT on display at the museum	1980	Crewe Heritage Trust	AC Electric multiple unit	InterCity	Static exhibit
DVT (Mark 3B)	82118	N/A	Another DVT in the same livery as 82118	1988	Crewe Heritage Trust	Driving Van Trailer	Abellio Greater Anglia	Static exhibit

== See also ==
- List of museums in Cheshire
- Crewe Railroad Museum in Crewe, Virginia, USA.
