= British Rail Class 370 =

British tilting electric passenger train

British Rail Class 370 Advanced Passenger Train – Prototype
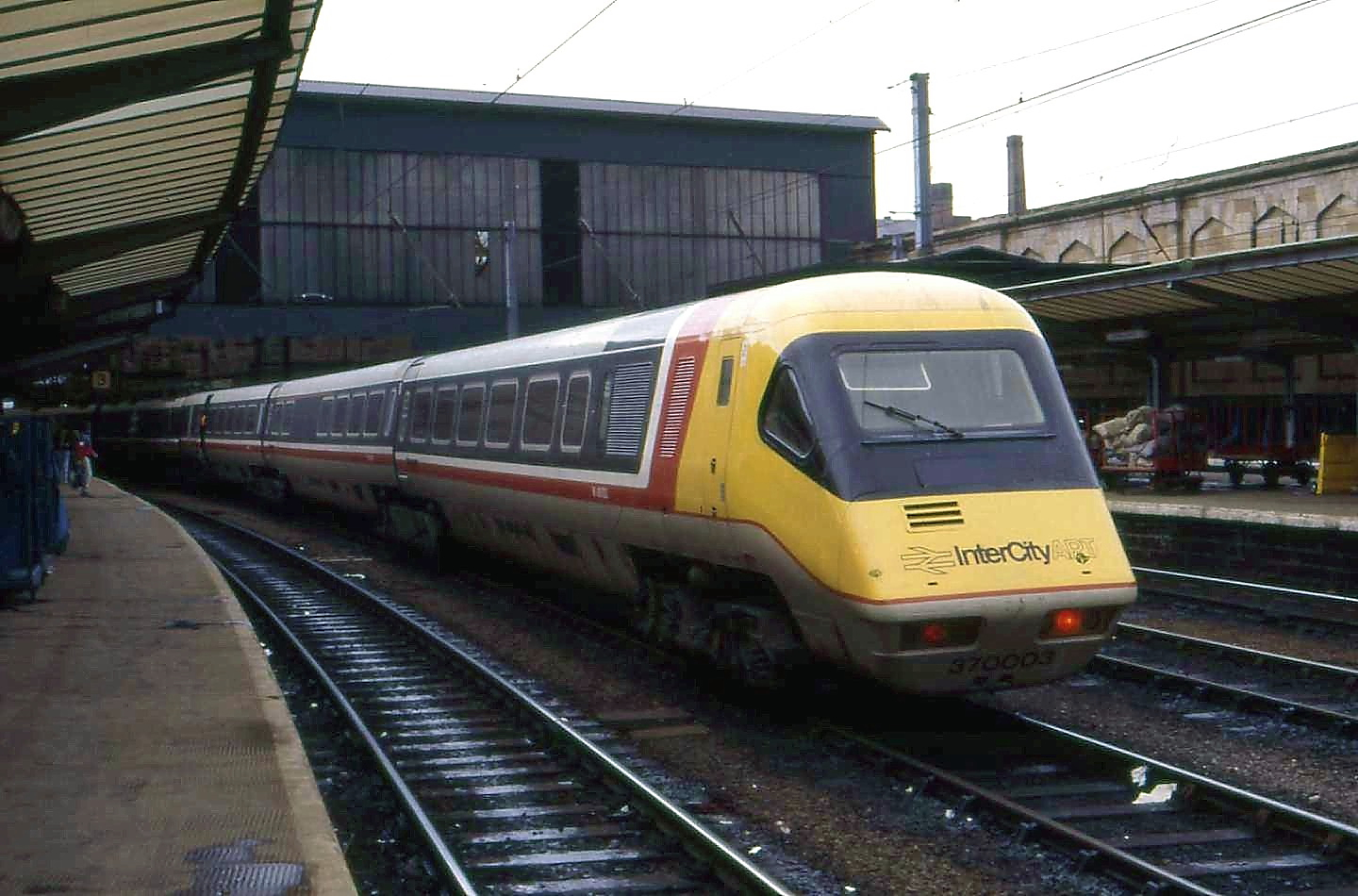
- Class 370 at Carlisle

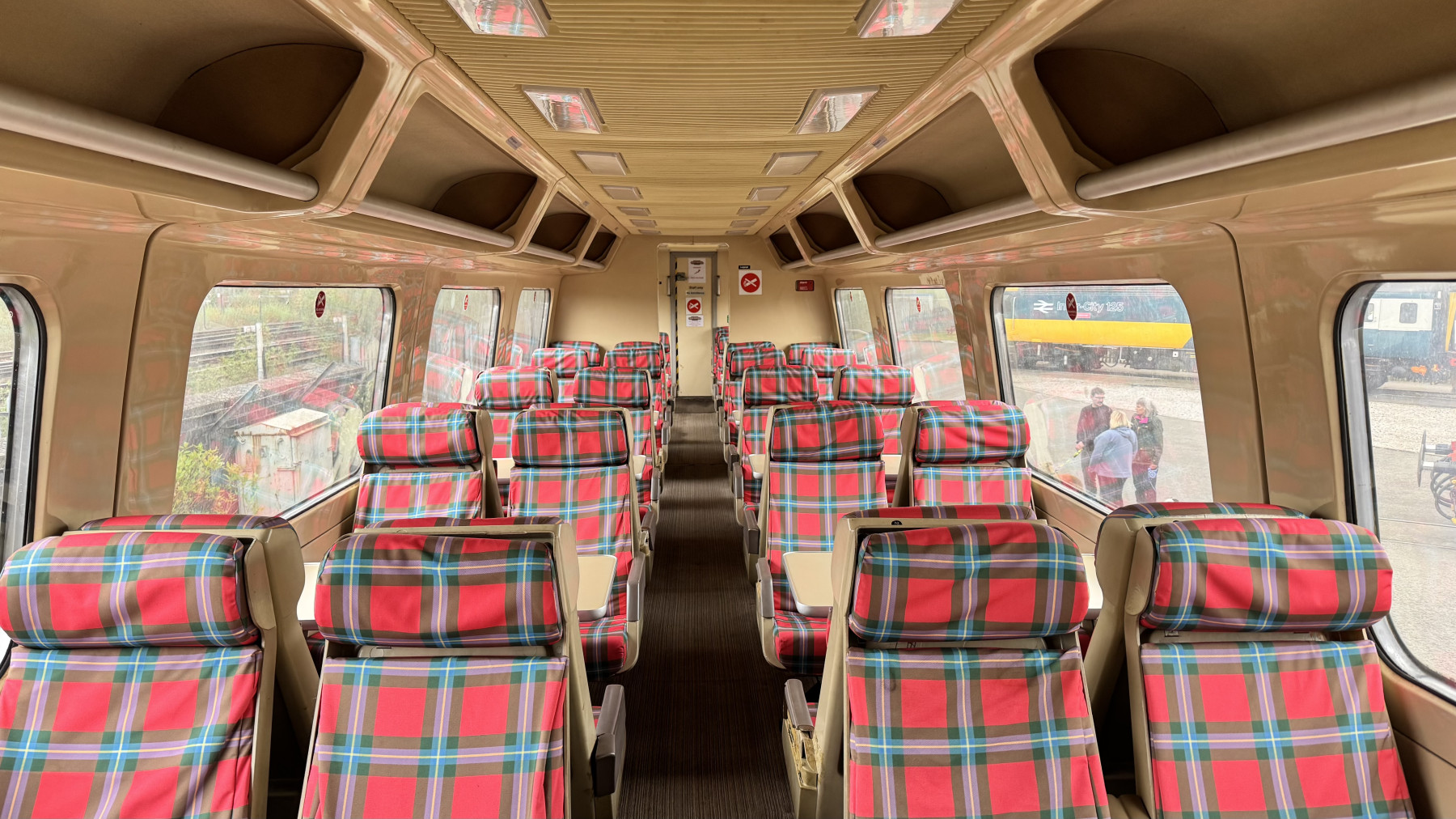
- Standard Class saloon of APT
- In service: 1980–1986
- Manufacturer: British Rail Engineering Limited
- Built at: Derby Works
- Family name: Advanced Passenger Train
- Constructed: 1977–1980
- Entered service: 1980
- Number built: 3 full sets (6 units plus 2 spare vehicles)
- Number preserved: 7 vehicles
- Formation: 7 cars per unit: DTS-TS-TRSB-TU-TF-TBF-M (full set is 2 units back-to-back)
- Diagram: DTS vehicles: LE201; TS vehicles: LH201; TRSB vehicles: LK201; TU vehicles: LH401; TF vehicles: LH101; TBF vehicles: LJ101; M vehicles: LC501
- Fleet numbers: 370001–370006
- Operator: British Rail InterCity
- Depot: Shields Road (Glasgow)
- Line served: West Coast Main Line

Specifications
- Car body construction: M vehicles: steel; Others: aluminium
- Train length: 147 m (482 ft)
- Car length: DTS vehs.: 21.440 m (70 ft 4.1 in); M vehs.: 20.400 m (66 ft 11.1 in); Others: 21.000 m (68 ft 10.8 in); (all including gangway portions)
- Width: 2.720 m (8 ft 11.1 in)
- Height: M vehicles: 3.397 m (11 ft 1.7 in); Others: 3.510 m (11 ft 6.2 in)
- Wheelbase: Over DTS/TBF veh. pivot centres: 14.850 m (48 ft 8.6 in); Over articulated vehicle pivots: 15.900 m (52 ft 2.0 in); Over M vehicle pivot centres: 13.000 m (42 ft 7.8 in)
- Maximum speed: 125 mph (200 km/h)
- Weight: DTS vehicles: 35 t (34 LT; 39 ST); TBF vehicles: 33 t (32 LT; 36 ST); M vehicles: 67.5 t (66.4 LT; 74.4 ST); Others: 24 t (24 LT; 26 ST)
- Traction motors: 4 × ASEA LJMA 410 F
- Power output: 3,000 kW (4,000 hp) continuous
- Electric system: 25 kV 50 Hz AC overhead
- Current collection: Pantograph
- UIC classification: 2′(2′)(2′)(2′)(2′)(2′)2′+Bo′Bo′
- Bogies: M vehicles: BREL BP17; At articulations: BREL BT11; Others: BREL BT12
- Minimum turning radius: 91 m (300 ft)
- Braking systems: Hydraulic and hydrokinetic
- Safety systems: AWS; C-APT
- Multiple working: Within class (max. 2 units)
- Track gauge: 1,435 mm (4 ft 8 1/2 in) standard gauge

Notes/references
- Specifications given for seven-car units as at August 1981, except where otherwise noted. A full set train would be formed of two units coupled back-to-back.

British Rail's Class 370 tilting trains, also referred to as APT-P (meaning Advanced Passenger Train Prototype), were the pre-production Advanced Passenger Train units. Unlike the earlier experimental gas-turbine APT-E unit, these units were electric multiple unit sets, powered by 25 kV AC overhead electrification and were used on the West Coast Main Line between London Euston and Glasgow Central. The train had eight traction motors fitted to the two central power cars giving a total output of 8,000 hp (6,000 kW), which enabled it to set the UK rail speed record of 162.2 mph (261.0 km/h) in December 1979, a record that stood for 23 years until broken by a Eurostar Class 373 on the newly completed High Speed 1 line.

== History ==
The APT-P was unveiled to the public on 7 June 1978 and continued to be used for testing into 1986. Due to ongoing technical problems with these pre-production units, and a lack of cash or political will to take the project forward, the planned APT-S (Advanced Passenger Train Squadron Service) production-series units were never built, but they did influence the design of the later InterCity 225 sets designed for the East Coast Main Line electrification. The influence is strongest with the Class 91 locos, which took many features from the APT power cars. The technology was later sold to Fiat Ferroviaria and used for improving their second-generation Pendolino trains, which are used worldwide, including on the West Coast Main Line as the Class 390.

=== Numbering ===
Units were numbered 370001–370006 (plus two spare cars labelled 370007) and were formed as follows:

- 48101–48107 – Driving trailer second
- 48201–48206 – Trailer second
- 48401–48406 – Trailer restaurant second buffet
- 48301–48306 – Trailer unclassified
- 48501–48506 – Trailer first
- 48601–48607 – Trailer brake first
- 49001–49006 – Non-driving motor
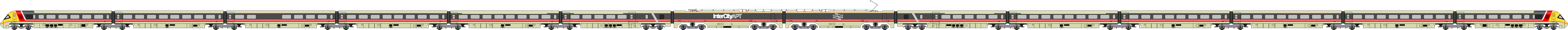
Side Profile

A full train was made up of two units running back-to-back, with the two motor cars adjoining. The motor cars had no seating accommodation or through-gangway, so the two halves of the train were unconnected for passengers.

=== Withdrawal and preservation ===
All six units were withdrawn during 1985 and 1986, and most cars were quickly scrapped. The remaining cars are exhibited at Crewe Heritage Centre, a museum located next to Crewe station.

- Of these, six cars are formed into a single train:
  - 48103 – Driving trailer second
  - 48404 – Trailer restaurant second buffet
  - 48603 – Trailer brake first
  - 49002 – Non-driving motor
  - 48602 – Trailer brake first
  - 48106 – Driving trailer second
- A single non-driving motor car does not form part of the train and is exhibited separately:
  - 49006 – Non-driving motor (not part of the above train) was on loan to the Electric Railway Museum in Coventry from July 2011 until its closure in October 2017 and moved back to Crewe Heritage Centre in March 2018.

== Models ==
In 1980, Hornby Railways produced a OO gauge five-car set model available as a train set with plain yellow fronts, which was released as a five-car train pack with black fronts and window surrounds in 1981, until appearing in the 1983 catalogue when the train set was last produced. In 1984 it was discontinued from the Hornby range. However, it was featured in the 1985 catalogue, although no new models were produced that year.

In 2020, Hornby Railways announced that as part of their centenary year range – and both the 40th anniversaries of the year it entered service and the original Hornby model a newly tooled OO gauge model of the BR Class 370 Advanced Passenger Train would be launched. The APT-P will be available as part of a five-car train pack consisting of sets 370 003 and 370 004 with plain yellow fronts included are DTS, TFB, NDM (motorised), TFB and DTS and a seven-car train pack included is the APT U Development coach, consisting of sets 370 001 and 370 002 with DTS, TBF, NDM (motorised), NDM (dummy), TBF and DTS in APT livery with black front and window surrounds. With the additional eight SKU' coaches available separately in two sets of four including TS, TU, TRBS, and TF with the additional NDM (motorised) and the APT U Development coach,(for the five-car pack) for each set to form a realistic complete full rake train for both train packs.

== See also ==
- British Rail Class 91
- List of high speed trains
