= British Rail APT-E =

1970s prototypical gas turbine train

British Rail APT-E (Advanced Passenger Train–Experimental)
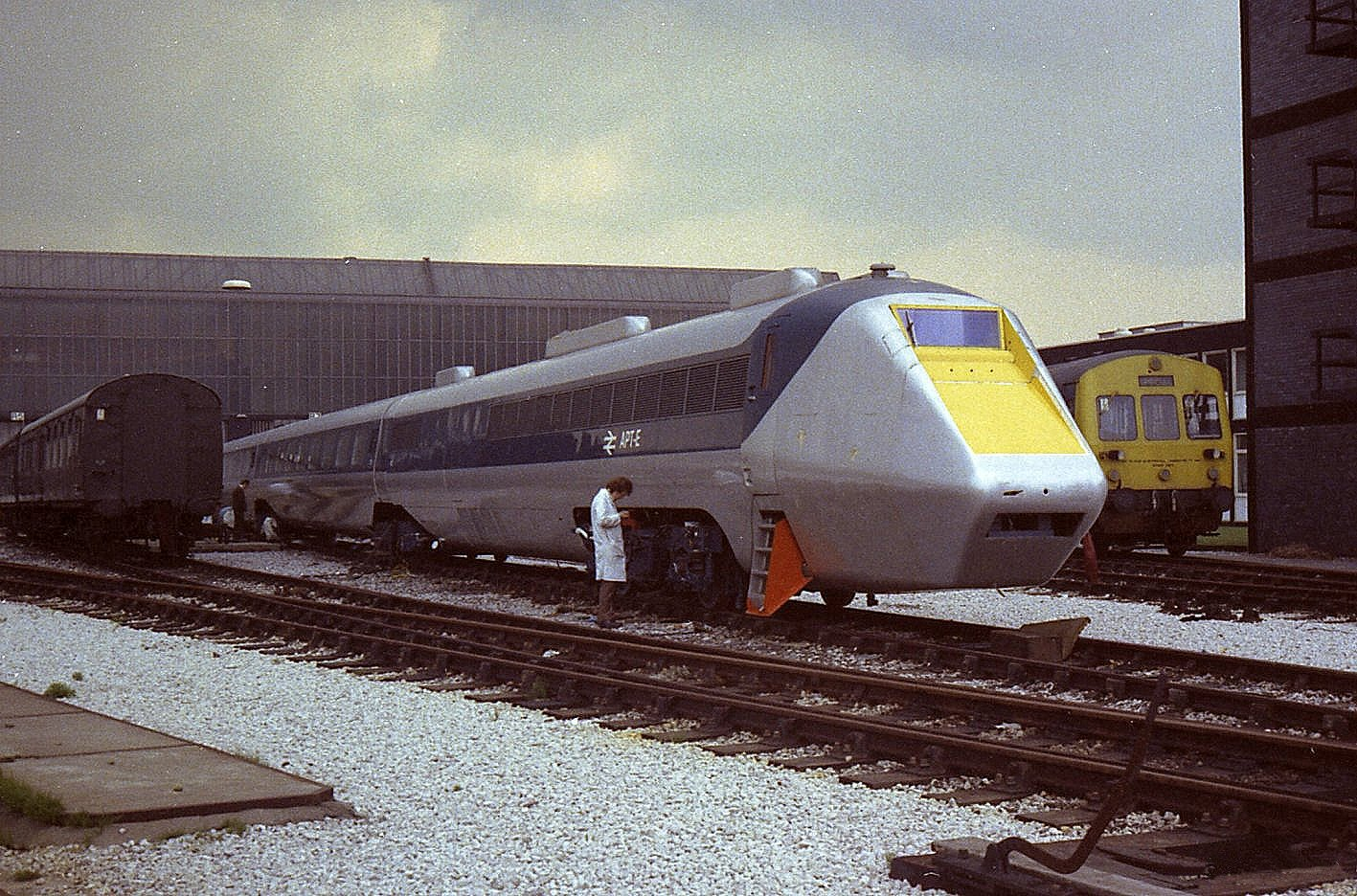
- APT-E in the RTC sidings between tests in 1972
- In service: 1972–1976
- Manufacturer: British Rail Research Division
- Built at: Derby
- Family name: APT
- Constructed: 1970-1972
- Entered service: 1972-1976
- Number built: 1 Trainset
- Formation: 4 cars
- Fleet numbers: PC1-2 (Power Cars); TC1-2 (Trailer Cars)
- Operator: British Rail

Specifications
- Maximum speed: 156 mph (251 km/h)
- Prime mover: Gas Turbine
- Braking system: Hydrokinetic
- Track gauge: 1,435 mm (4 ft 8 1/2 in) standard gauge

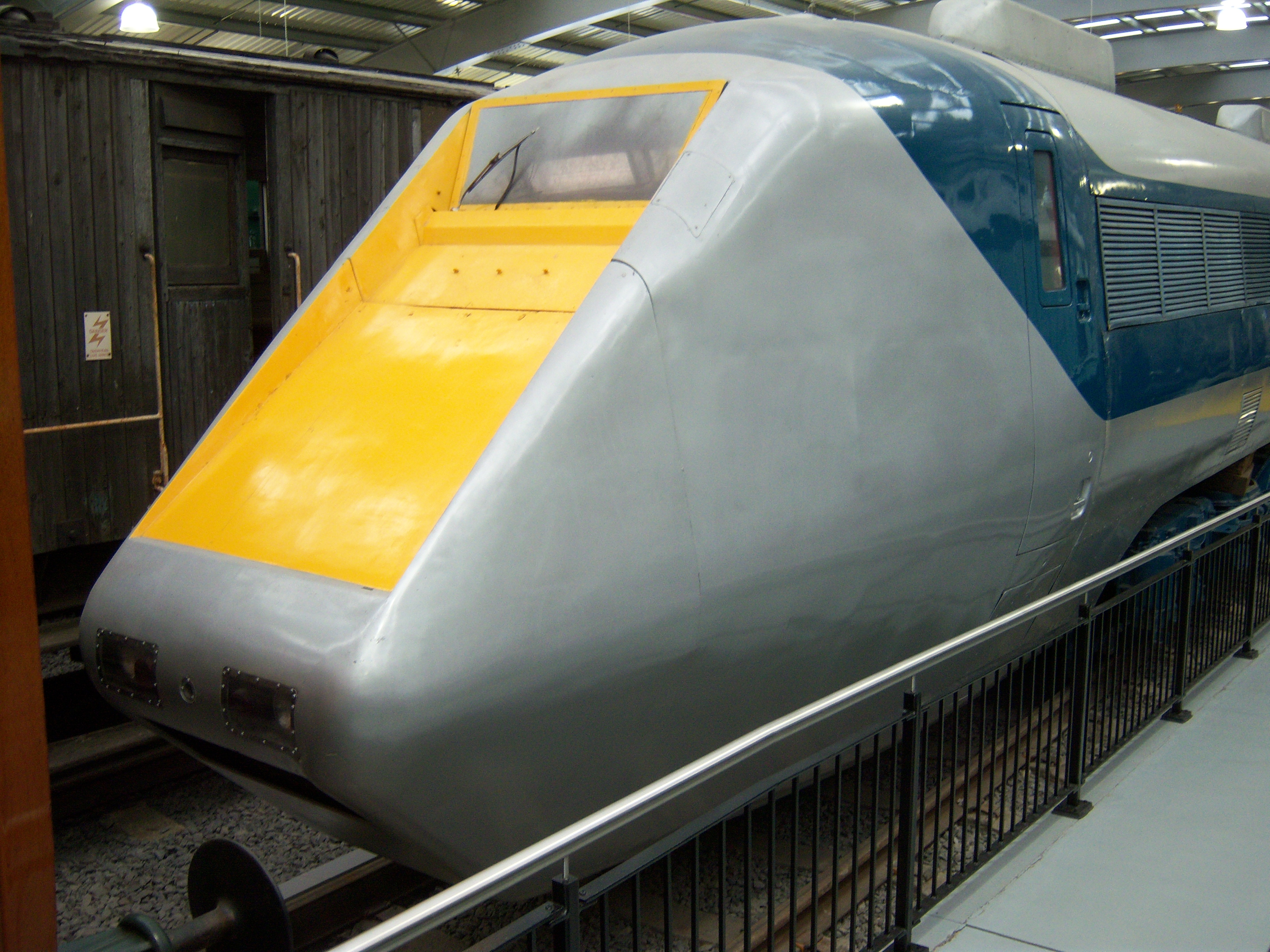
APT-E at Locomotion, Shildon, County Durham

The APT-E, for Advanced Passenger Train Experimental, was the prototype Advanced Passenger Train tilting train unit. It was powered by gas turbines, the only multiple unit so powered that was used by British Rail. The APT-E consisted of two driving power cars (PC1 and 2) and two trailer cars (TC1 and 2). Each power car was equipped with four Rover-built Leyland 2S/350 gas turbines (and a fifth for auxiliary power supplies), which initially produced 300 hp each but were progressively uprated to 330 hp. Two GEC 253AY nose suspended traction motors provided the traction on the leading bogies. The vehicles were manufactured from aluminium and were approximately 70 ft long (21.34 m), with articulated bogies between them.

The APT-E made its first run on 25 July 1972 from Derby to Duffield and was immediately 'blacked' by the drivers' union ASLEF, due to concerns that the single driver's seat pre-empted ongoing negotiations about the single-manning of trains. It was over twelve months before it ran again on the main line in August 1973.

The prototype was eventually tried out on the Great Western Main Line, and achieved a new British railway speed record when on 10 August 1975 it hit 152.3 mph (245.1 km/h) whilst on test with the Western Region between Swindon and Reading. It was also tested extensively on the Midland Main Line out of London St. Pancras and on the Old Dalby Test Track, where in January 1976 it attained a speed of 143.6 mph (231.1 km/h).

The unit was only intended for testing and was never used in ordinary public service, although it did carry office staff and the occasional dignitary on trial runs. When its period of testing was complete, in June 1976, it was sent to the National Railway Museum, York for preservation. It is now based at the NRM's Locomotion museum in Shildon. When further APT Class 370 units were built, they were powered by 25 kV AC electrification.

== Test bed set ==
The APT-POP (Power-0-Power) set was a rake of three skeletal unpowered carriages used as a test bed for the suspension, tilting and braking systems used by APT units. The 'Power pumps' were only mock-ups, though similar externally to PC1 and PC2 in the APT-E unit minus cabs, and the whole set had to be hauled by a locomotive. Following the abandonment of the APT project, all three carriages were scrapped in 1985. The set was formed as follows:

- Number: RDB975634 - RDB975636 - RDB975635
- Identity: PC3 - Lab 8 - PC4

== See also ==
- Advanced Passenger Train
- British Rail Class 370
- Gas turbine locomotive
