= Crewe North Junction signal box =

Coordinates: 53.0926°N 2.4349°W

Down Main Lines and Chester side of the frame

Crewe North Junction signal box is signal box with a Westinghouse All Electric Style 'L' lever frame which was commissioned, along with Crewe South Junction signal box (which also had a Westinghouse Style 'L' frame), on 29 March 1940 as part of a resignalling project at Crewe railway station. It saw continued use until 19 July 1985 when it was decommissioned for a redesign of Crewe station and its track layout and signalling.

== Location ==
Crewe North Junction signal box is located on the junction to the North of Crewe railway station between the Chester Lines and the West Coast Main Line. The signal box can also see the lines to and from Manchester and Sandbach and all the platforms on the north side of the station. The signal box, still at its original site, is located in Crewe Heritage Centre where there are now demonstrations and simulations of the signalling in the North Junction box by a team of signallers.

== Design ==
Crewe North Junction signal box contained a lever frame of the Westinghouse Style 'L' design (Westinghouse is now part of Invensys Rail) which was commissioned with Crewe South Junction signal box, which was of the same design. Crewe North Junction signal box was built to a non-standard ARP design, with 15" thick reinforced concrete walls and an 18" thick concrete roof. This was due to it being commissioned in 1940 during World War II so it was built to survive an air raid.

== Track layout ==
The track layout of Crewe North Junction can be seen below. These images are from the Chester side diagram of the box.

== Operation ==
=== Staffing ===
The signal box was staffed by four people: two signalmen, a signal box-lad and a regulator. In the later days it was just the signalmen and the box-lad.

=== Adjacent boxes ===
Originally there were eight adjacent signal boxes, until November 1958 when Crewe No.3 box and 2 June 1960 when Crewe Station 'B' box was closed. Control of the lines was handed over to Crewe South Junction.

==== Crewe South Junction ====
Crewe South Junction was a signal box of the same design as North Junction and was commissioned as part of the same project. Absolute block working was operated between Crewe North and South Junctions, with a block bell for each platform to communicate with South Junction. 'Train on line' would be given to South Junction as the train entered the platform as seen from track circuits or visually from the box. 'Out of Section' would be given when South Junction had seen the train leave the platform complete with tail lamp, thus ensuring no part of the train had become uncoupled and left in the platform. Platforms 4, 5 and 6 were 'Up platforms' which meant trains could only be sent 'Up' into those platforms i.e. towards South Junction. Platform 3 was 'bi-directional' so a train could be sent to or from South Junction, meaning there are two block instruments for this platform in both North and South junctions. Platform 2 was 'Down only' and trains could only be sent from South to North. South Junction closed on 2 June 1985, just over a month before Crewe North Junction closed. Signalling was handed over to Crewe Signalling Centre (a power signal box) which still exists to this day.

The lever frame from Crewe South was preserved and is in use at the Great Cockcrow Railway.

==== Crewe Station 'A' ====
This box controlled platform 1 (a Down platform), Down Through 1 and Horse Landing Siding. Crewe Station 'A' operated absolute block working on platform 1 and Down Through 1, with a bell and direction selector for each in North Junction. As with South Junction, Station 'A' closed on 2 June 1985. Crewe Station 'A' was then preserved and moved to Crewe Heritage Centre where it can now be seen. It will shortly (Winter 2010) be re-connected to Crewe North Junction box so demonstrations can be provided with two boxes simultaneously.

==== Coal Yard ====
Coal Yard signal box is located 986 yards to the north of North Junction on the West Coast Main Line, with two lines to Coal Yard, Down Fast and Down Slow and two lines from Coal Yard, Up Fast and Up Slow. Operation on this line is track circuit block. This required a train describer in North Junction and Coal Yard into which the headcode of the train to be sent is entered. This is then received on the next box's describer. Coal Yard box remains open to this day.

==== Sydney Bridge / Sandbach PSB ====
1168 yards away on the Manchester Lines (Up and Down Manchester) was Sydney Bridge signal box. As on the WCML, Track Circuit Block was operated on these lines. The train describer for these lines can be seen to the right. On 5 June 1959, Sydney Bridge was closed and replaced by Sandbach Power Signal Box (PSB) (4 miles 869 yards away). Crewe North Junction was unaffected by this change with the only difference being where the train describers were connected to. Sandbach box closed in March 2006, when the Manchester line was resignalled and control handed over to the new Manchester South SCC.

==== Steelworks ====
Steelworks is located 1 mile and 421 yards away on the Chester Lines (Up and Down Chester). Absolute block is operated with a block instrument in each box. Steelworks is still operating on the Chester Lines.

==== Salop Goods ====
Salop Goods box is located 760 yards away at Salop Goods Junction on the Up and Down Chester Independent Lines. Track circuit block was operated on these lines.

== The signal box now ==
Crewe North Junction box is still located where it was built in 1939 but it now within the boundary of Crewe Heritage Centre. The box is now used for signalling demonstrations by a signalling team at Crewe Heritage Centre. It is in the same condition as it was when it closed apart from the number of relays have been reduced and the battery backup room removed as these facilities were no longer needed after it was taken from operation.

== Signalling at Crewe now ==
The signalling at Crewe is now controlled by a power signal box a short distance to the north west of the Station. This controls all lines at Crewe North Junction and Crewe South Junction and entry into the station. This signalling centre was only intended as a 'temporary measure' from 1985 for around three years. It still controls Crewe today.
