= Leyland 2S/350 gas turbine =

The Leyland 2S gas turbine was developed by British Leyland to power road vehicles. The original version, the 2S/150 was famous for its use in a series of racing cars in the 1960s. In 1968, the basic layout was used to develop the larger 2S/350 for use in semi-trailers. The 2S/350 was also used in the British Rail APT-E train. Both were used only experimentally, development ended in the 1970s.

== Previous work ==
The engine's development traces its history to the Rover Company's experience with their work with Frank Whittle during World War II. Rover explored the use of turbine power in automotive roles in the post-war period, most famously with the Rover JET1, which won several speed records in the early 1950s, and the Rover-BRM which ran at the 24 Hours of Le Mans from 1963 to 1965. The BRM turbine had been adapted as the 2S/150, with a nominal 150 BHP. However, use in automobiles remained out of the question unless the cost of the engines could be greatly reduced, something that appeared to demand new materials.

== Original concept ==
Rover was purchased by Leyland Motors in 1967. The director of engineering at Leyland, Dr Bertie Fogg, asked if the 2S/150 could be used in a truck, and suggested a conversion of the Leyland Super Comet, whose existing engine was a 130 BHP Diesel. The engineers pointed out that using an engine of about the same power would lead to poor fuel economy, but Fogg persisted.

In 1968, Leyland Motors merged with British Motor Holdings to become British Leyland. Semi-trailers were in the midst of evolving to larger designs after the UK weight limit was raised to 44 short tons (40 t). Combined with the desire for a power loading of about 8 BHP/ton, this demanded engines in the 350 to 400 brake horsepower (BHP) range. A turbine of this power would cost more than the Diesel to purchase and operate, but the overall lifetime cost would be similar given the much smaller maintenance requirements of a turbine.

In terms of fuel economy, Rover's previous work had improved mileage from 4 mpg on the JET1 to 31 mpg on the BRM. While the Diesel outperformed the turbine at lower power settings, theoretical studies suggested the turbine was increasingly competitive as one approached 300 BHP, and above that was more efficient. Given a typical workload during a journey, it was expected a turbine would burn somewhere between 10 and 25% more fuel, but at the time, this represented between 2 and 5% of overall operational costs.

== Mark I ==
The engine was a gas generator design with a separate free-running low-pressure turbine for extracting power. Heat was recovered from the exhaust by two disk-shaped ceramic heat exchangers. In contrast to earlier designs, the housing for the engine was made of cast iron, instead of more expensive machined stainless steel. The casing's relative softness also proved to absorb much of the noise of the engine. To allow the possibility of engine braking, and to further improve fuel economy, variable turbine nozzles were used. The power extraction turbine was geared 10:1 directly to the drive shaft.

Rounding out the system in truck use was a 10-speed automatic transmission, an axillary shaft for starting and power-take-off, and, later, a cooling system to cool off the bearings after the engine had shut down. The engine easily met UK noise limits, and was 10 times better in emissions, beating then-current Californian limits by 2 times.

== Mark II ==
Based on experiments with an early model, retroactively known as Mark I, a new Mark II version was built. Among the major changes was the removal of the two-disk heat exchanger with a single larger disk on top of the engine. While this reduced the recuperative capability, it was simpler and meant that the stored heat was released off the top of the engine where it didn't cause further heating of the bearings. Many minor re-arrangements and improvements were also included.

Six trucks using the Mark II engine were completed and sent out for road service trials in the early 1970s with Castrol, Esso, Shell-Mex & BP and three more for Leyland's own use. Shell-Mex returned theirs after a year, suffering breakdowns in the gearbox and turbine. However, its drivers praised it, especially the low-noise operation.

== Project end ==
Rapidly rising costs of fuel and labour were considered to be important problems when the program was ongoing. At the time these were not considered too serious, but these ultimately proved to be the undoing of the concept. During the 1973 Oil Crisis, fuel costs rose three times, and what was at one time a theoretical 5% increase in operational costs suddenly ballooned.

This led to something of a technology race as the companies developing turbines, including Leyland, Ford and Detroit Diesel, modified their designs for increased fuel economy while conventional diesel designs were doing the same. Ultimately, all of these efforts were abandoned.

There is some question whether the project was ever a serious one. The problem of sealing the recuperator disks was never wholly solved, and as a result, the engine had "horrific" fuel consumption. When asked why the company was persisting with its development, Donald Stokes, Baron Stokes the CEO of Leyland, replied that "It tells the world we are a progressive company and that we have great imagination."

== See also ==
- Free-turbine turboshaft
